= Teterboro, New Jersey =

Borough in Bergen County, New Jersey, US

- Borough
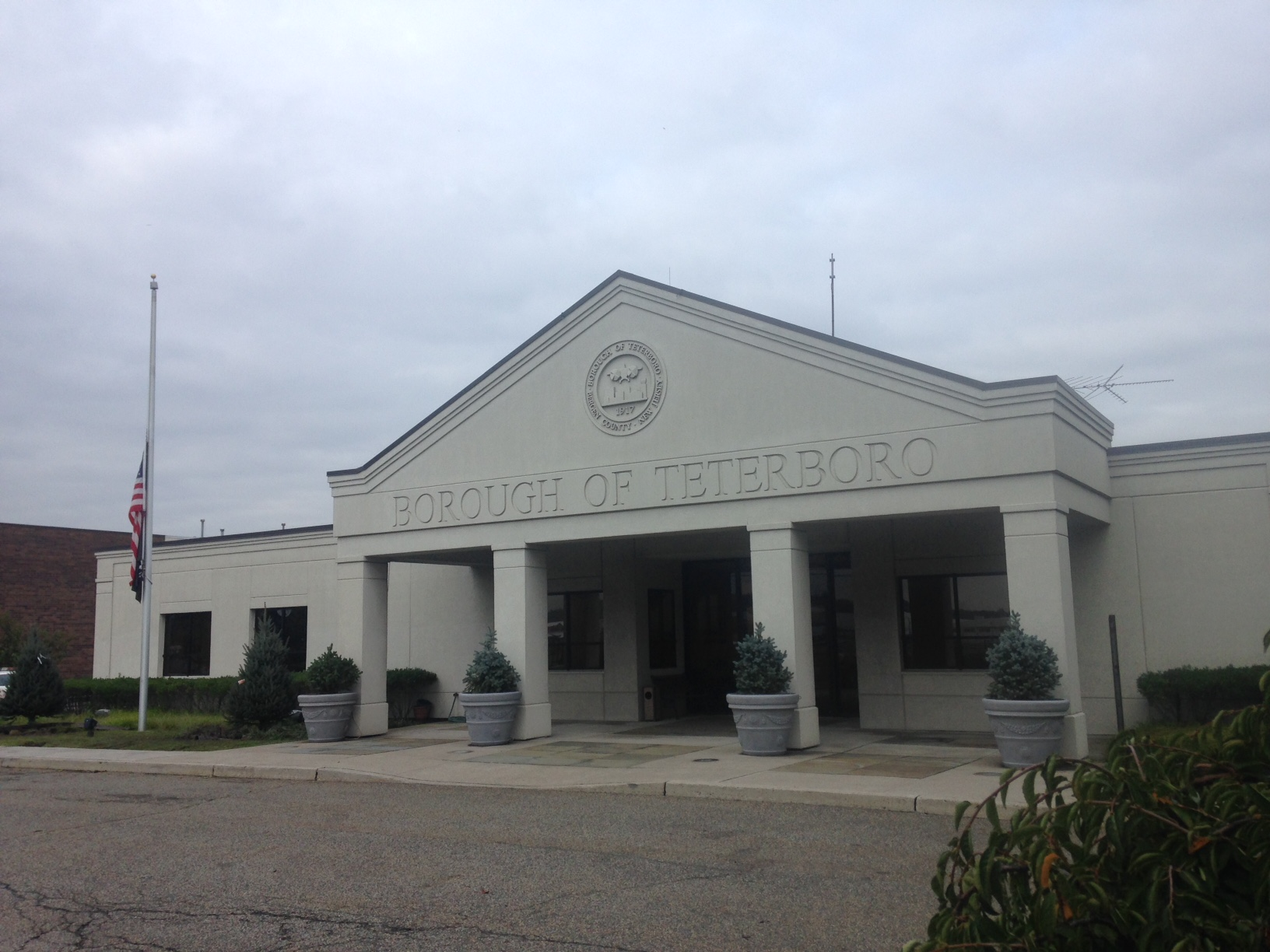
- Teterboro Municipal Building in September 2018

- Seal

- Location of Teterboro in Bergen County highlighted in red (left). Inset map: Location of Bergen County in New Jersey highlighted in orange (right).

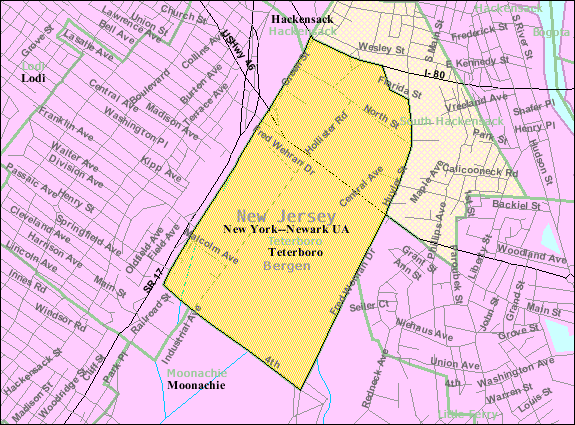
- Census Bureau map of Teterboro, New Jersey

- Location in Bergen County Location in New Jersey Location in the United States
- Coordinates: 40.854573°N 74.059619°W
- Country: United States
- State: New Jersey
- County: Bergen
- Incorporated: March 26, 1917
- Named for: Walter C. Teter

Government
  - Type: 1923 Municipal Manager Law
  - Body: Borough Council
  - Mayor: John P. Watt (term ends June 30, 2026)
  - Administrator: Nicholas C. Saros
  - Municipal clerk: Virginia A. Alcuri

Area
  - Total: 1.11 sq mi (2.88 km^{2})
  - Land: 1.11 sq mi (2.87 km^{2})
  - Water: 0.0039 sq mi (0.01 km^{2}) 0.36%
  - Rank: 493rd of 565 in state 63rd of 70 in county
- Elevation: 7 ft (2.1 m)

Population (2020)
  - Total: 61
  - Estimate (2023): 71
  - Rank: 562nd of 565 in state 70th of 70 in county
  - Density: 55.1/sq mi (21.3/km^{2})
  - Rank: 552nd of 565 in state 70th of 70 in county
- Time zone: UTC−05:00 (Eastern (EST))
  - Summer (DST): UTC−04:00 (Eastern (EDT))
- ZIP Code: 07608
- Area code: 201
- FIPS code: 3400372480
- GNIS feature ID: 0885418
- Website: www.teterboronj.org

Teterboro (English pronunciation: /ˈtiːtəɹbʌɹoʊ/) is a borough in Bergen County, in the U.S. state of New Jersey. As of the 2020 United States census, the borough's population was 61, a decrease of six (−9.0%) from the 2010 census count of 67, which reflected an increase of 49 (+272.2%) from the 18 counted in the 2000 census. After being ranked as the fourth-smallest municipality, by population, in New Jersey through the 2010 census, the borough became the third smallest following the 2022 merger of Pine Valley into Pine Hill.

Teterboro is the home of Teterboro Airport (operated by the Port Authority of New York and New Jersey), which takes up a majority of the borough as well as portions of Hasbrouck Heights and Moonachie.

== History ==
Teterboro was incorporated on March 26, 1917, from land that was part of the boroughs of Moonachie, Little Ferry, and Lodi Township. The borough was enlarged on July 5, 1918, by an area annexed from Hasbrouck Heights. The borough was named for Walter C. Teter, a New York investment banker, who purchased the land in 1917 to build a racetrack and developed a 700-acre (280 ha) site, reclaiming marshland and building an airport and an 18-hole golf course. The name Teterboro was changed on April 14, 1937, to Bendix Borough, but reverted to Teterboro Borough on June 1, 1943. In 1951, Vera Martucci became the first woman to be elected mayor of the borough.

Throughout the borough's history, neighboring municipalities, such as Hasbrouck Heights and South Hackensack, have made repeated attempts to dissolve Teterboro, in hopes of absorbing the borough's ratables (the value of land and buildings which are assessed for property taxes), while state legislators have argued that the population is too small for the borough to justify its own existence, though all such attempts have met with failure. In 1966 Vito Albanese and Ned J. Parsekian introduced legislation in the New Jersey General Assembly that would eliminate the borough of Teterboro and divide it up among four adjacent municipalities. In July 2010, a bill was introduced in the New Jersey Legislature in a renewed effort to divide Teterboro among neighboring municipalities. The bill, sponsored by Senator Robert M. Gordon and Assembly members Connie Wagner and Vincent Prieto, stalled in the state Legislature after its introduction, due to opposition from borough officials, residents, business and land owners, and the neighboring municipalities of Moonachie and Hasbrouck Heights. Legislators attempted to include a 20-year tax abatement within the bill to alleviate the concerns of Teterboro business and property owners who were concerned that taxes could spike if the borough was dissolved. The legality of such an abatement was also called into question.

== Geography ==
According to the United States Census Bureau, the borough had a total area of 1.11 square miles (2.88 km^{2}), including 1.11 square miles (2.87 km^{2}) of land and <0.01 square miles (0.01 km^{2}) of water (0.36%).

The borough borders the Bergen County municipalities of Hackensack, Hasbrouck Heights, Little Ferry, Moonachie and South Hackensack.

== Climate ==
Climate data for Teterboro Airport, New Jersey (1991–2020 normals, extremes 1969–present)
Month	Jan	Feb	Mar	Apr	May	Jun	Jul	Aug	Sep	Oct	Nov	Dec	Year
Record high °F (°C)	73 (23)	80 (27)	85 (29)	95 (35)	98 (37)	101 (38)	104 (40)	102 (39)	99 (37)	95 (35)	84 (29)	77 (25)	104 (40)
Mean maximum °F (°C)	60.9 (16.1)	61.5 (16.4)	70.2 (21.2)	83.4 (28.6)	90.6 (32.6)	94.2 (34.6)	97.3 (36.3)	94.8 (34.9)	91.3 (32.9)	82.5 (28.1)	72.4 (22.4)	63.9 (17.7)	98.4 (36.9)
Mean daily maximum °F (°C)	39.9 (4.4)	42.8 (6.0)	50.6 (10.3)	62.5 (16.9)	73.1 (22.8)	82.0 (27.8)	87.0 (30.6)	85.1 (29.5)	78.4 (25.8)	66.8 (19.3)	55.5 (13.1)	44.9 (7.2)	64.1 (17.8)
Daily mean °F (°C)	32.8 (0.4)	34.9 (1.6)	42.3 (5.7)	53.1 (11.7)	63.2 (17.3)	72.5 (22.5)	78.0 (25.6)	76.2 (24.6)	69.2 (20.7)	57.4 (14.1)	46.9 (8.3)	37.9 (3.3)	55.4 (13.0)
Mean daily minimum °F (°C)	25.7 (−3.5)	27.0 (−2.8)	34.0 (1.1)	43.7 (6.5)	53.3 (11.8)	63.1 (17.3)	68.9 (20.5)	67.3 (19.6)	59.9 (15.5)	47.9 (8.8)	38.3 (3.5)	30.8 (−0.7)	46.7 (8.1)
Mean minimum °F (°C)	8.0 (−13.3)	10.9 (−11.7)	19.0 (−7.2)	30.3 (−0.9)	39.6 (4.2)	49.9 (9.9)	58.7 (14.8)	55.9 (13.3)	45.7 (7.6)	33.2 (0.7)	23.9 (−4.5)	16.3 (−8.7)	5.8 (−14.6)
Record low °F (°C)	−7 (−22)	−2 (−19)	8 (−13)	19 (−7)	32 (0)	42 (6)	49 (9)	43 (6)	38 (3)	24 (−4)	14 (−10)	−3 (−19)	−7 (−22)
Average precipitation inches (mm)	3.28 (83)	2.82 (72)	4.09 (104)	3.97 (101)	3.94 (100)	4.25 (108)	4.45 (113)	4.25 (108)	4.11 (104)	3.73 (95)	3.30 (84)	4.10 (104)	46.29 (1,176)
Average precipitation days (≥ 0.01 in)	10.7	10.1	11.2	11.4	12.1	11.0	9.7	10.4	8.7	10.5	9.1	11.6	126.5
Source 1: NOAA
Source 2: National Weather Service

== Demographics ==
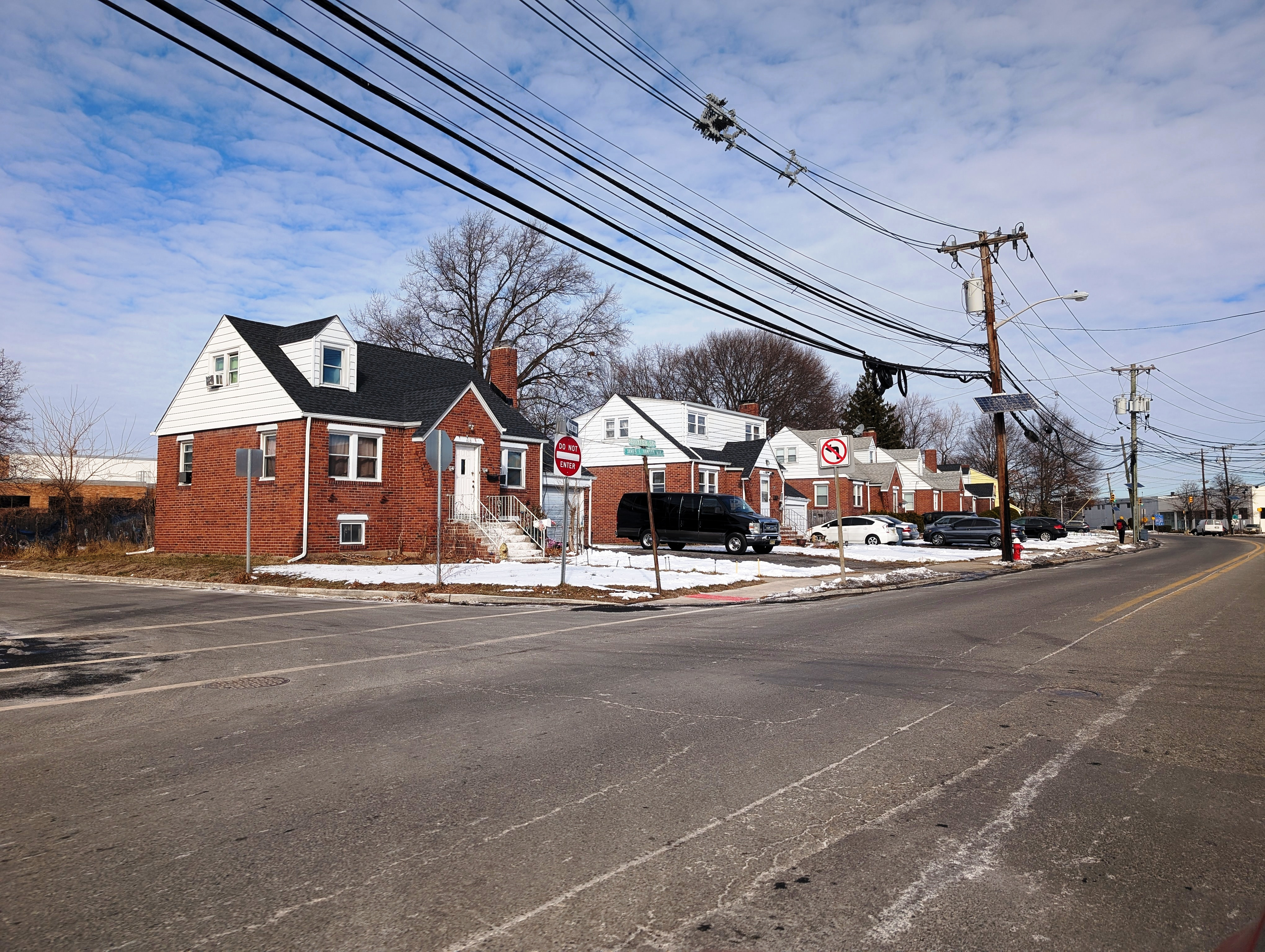
Some of the only residences in Teterboro along Huyler Street

Historical population
Census	Pop.	Note	%±
1900	7		—
1910	20		185.7%
1920	24		20.0%
1930	26		8.3%
1940	40		53.8%
1950	28		−30.0%
1960	22		−21.4%
1970	19		−13.6%
1980	19		0.0%
1990	22		15.8%
2000	18		−18.2%
2010	67		272.2%
2020	61		−9.0%
2023 (est.)	71	▲	16.4%
Population sources: 1920; 1920–1930 1900–2020; 2000 2010 2020

=== 2020 census ===
Teterboro borough, New Jersey – Racial and ethnic composition Note: the US Census treats Hispanic/Latino as an ethnic category. This table excludes Latinos from the racial categories and assigns them to a separate category. Hispanics/Latinos may be of any race.
Race / Ethnicity (NH = Non-Hispanic)	Pop 2000	Pop 2010	Pop 2020	% 2000	% 2010	% 2020
White alone (NH)	15	31	26	83.33%	46.27%	42.62%
Black or African American alone (NH)	0	2	7	0.00%	2.99%	11.48%
Native American or Alaska Native alone (NH)	0	2	0	0.00%	2.99%	0.00%
Asian alone (NH)	0	2	1	0.00%	2.99%	1.64%
Native Hawaiian or Pacific Islander alone (NH)	0	0	0	0.00%	0.00%	0.00%
Other race alone (NH)	0	0	0	0.00%	0.00%	0.00%
Mixed race or Multiracial (NH)	3	6	2	16.67%	8.96%	3.28%
Hispanic or Latino (any race)	0	24	25	0.00%	35.82%	40.98%
Total	18	67	61	100.00%	100.00%	100.00%

=== 2010 census ===
The 2010 United States census counted 67 people, 25 households, and 13 families in the borough. The population density was 57.9 per square mile (22.4/km^{2}). There were 27 housing units at an average density of 23.3 per square mile (9.0/km^{2}). The racial makeup was 67.16% (45) White, 4.48% (3) Black or African American, 2.99% (2) Native American, 2.99% (2) Asian, 0.00% (0) Pacific Islander, 8.96% (6) from other races, and 13.43% (9) from two or more races. Hispanic or Latino of any race were 35.82% (24) of the population.

Of the 25 households, 28.0% had children under the age of 18; 36.0% were married couples living together; 12.0% had a female householder with no husband present and 48.0% were non-families. Of all households, 32.0% were made up of individuals and 20.0% had someone living alone who was 65 years of age or older. The average household size was 2.68 and the average family size was 3.85.

23.9% of the population were under the age of 18, 6.0% from 18 to 24, 23.9% from 25 to 44, 32.8% from 45 to 64, and 13.4% who were 65 years of age or older. The median age was 43.5 years. For every 100 females, the population had 86.1 males. For every 100 females ages 18 and older there were 96.2 males.

The Census Bureau's 2006–2010 American Community Survey showed that (in 2010 inflation-adjusted dollars) median household income was $78,571 (with a margin of error of +/− $31,104) and the median family income was $79,107 (+/− $46,857). Males had a median income of $72,031 (+/− $9,149) versus $24,286 (+/− $75,310) for females. The per capita income for the borough was $32,446 (+/− $14,230). About none of families and 13.4% of the population were below the poverty line, including none of those under age 18 and 100.0% of those age 65 or over.

Same-sex couples headed no households in either 2010 or 2000.

=== 2000 census ===
As of the 2000 United States census there were 18 people, 7 households, and 4 families residing in the borough. The population density was 16.2 people per square mile (6.3/km^{2}). There were 8 housing units at an average density of 7.2 per square mile (2.8/km^{2}). The racial makeup of the borough was 83.33% White, and 16.67% from two or more races.

There were 7 households, out of which 42.9% had children under the age of 18 living with them, 42.9% were married couples living together, 28.6% had a female householder with no husband present, and 28.6% were non-families. 14.3% of all households were made up of individuals, and 14.3% had someone living alone who was 65 years of age or older. The average household size was 2.57 and the average family size was 3.00.

In the borough the population was spread out, with 33.3% under the age of 18, 5.6% from 18 to 24, 50.0% from 25 to 44, 5.6% from 45 to 64, and 5.6% who were 65 years of age or older. The median age was 33 years. For every 100 females, there were 100.0 males. For every 100 females age 18 and over, there were 100.0 males.

The median income for a household in the borough was $44,167, and the median income for a family was $43,750. Males had a median income of $18,750 versus $38,750 for females. The per capita income for the borough was $72,613. None of the population or families were below the poverty line.

Borough officials stated that the 2000 census had failed to count any of the residents of the Vincent Place housing units who had moved into the newly built homes in 1999. The uncounted residents, including the Mayor and all four council members, would help account for a projected tripling of the population enumerated by the census. Previously, the Mayor and Council, as well as several other Vincent Place residents, had all been residents of Huyler Street, the only other street zoned as a residential area in the borough. In a March 2010 article, published in The Record, Teterboro's municipal manager at the time noted that the actual population of the town had grown to approximately 60.

== Government ==
=== Local government ===
Teterboro is governed under the 1923 Municipal Manager Law form of New Jersey municipal government. The borough is one of seven municipalities (of the 564) statewide that use this form of government. The governing body is comprised of a five-member Borough Council, with all positions elected at-large on a non-partisan basis to four-year terms on a concurrent basis in elections held as part of the November general election. At a reorganization meeting held in July after each election, the Council members provide nominations from within itself before electing one of its members to serve as mayor.

As of 2025, Teterboro's Borough Council consists of Mayor John P. Watt, Christie Emden, Juan Ramirez, Gregory Stein and John B. Watt, all serving concurrent terms of office ending December 31, 2026.

Starting in January 2016, the Moonachie Police Department assumed responsibility for all law enforcement services, which are provided under contract. From 2012 through 2015, Moonachie had patrolled the southern portion of the borough, while the northern portion was covered by the Bergen County Police Department.

In 2018, the borough had an average property tax bill of $2,059, the lowest in the county, compared to an average bill of $11,780 in Bergen County and $8,767 statewide.

=== Federal, state and county representation ===
Teterboro is located in the 9th Congressional District and is part of New Jersey's 38th state legislative district.

For the 119th United States Congress, New Jersey's 9th congressional district is represented by Nellie Pou (D, North Haledon) New Jersey is represented in the United States Senate by Democrats Cory Booker (Newark, term ends 2027) and Andy Kim (Moorestown, term ends 2031).

For the 2026–2027 session, the 38th legislative district of the New Jersey Legislature is represented in the State Senate by Joseph Lagana (D, Paramus) and in the General Assembly by Lisa Swain (D, Fair Lawn) and Chris Tully (D, Bergenfield).

Bergen County is governed by a directly elected County Executive, with legislative functions performed by a Board of County Commissioners comprised of seven members who are elected at-large to three-year terms in partisan elections on a staggered basis, with either two or three seats coming up for election each November; a Chairman and Vice Chairman are selected from among its seven members at a reorganization meeting held every January. As of 2025, the county executive is James J. Tedesco III (D, Paramus), whose four-year term of office ends December 31, 2026.

Bergen County's Commissioners are Chair Mary J. Amoroso (D, Mahwah, 2025), Vice Chair Steven A. Tanelli (D, North Arlington, 2027), Chair Pro Tem Joan Voss (D, Fort Lee, 2026), Rafael Marte (D, Bergenfield, 2026), Germaine M. Ortiz (D, Emerson, 2025), Thomas J. Sullivan Jr. (D, Montvale, 2025) and Tracy Silna Zur (D, Franklin Lakes, 2027).

Bergen County's elected constitutional officials are Clerk John S. Hogan (D, Northvale, 2026), Sheriff Anthony Cureton (D, Englewood, 2027) and Surrogate Michael R. Dressler (D, Cresskill, 2026).

=== Politics ===
As of March 2011, there were a total of 39 registered voters in Teterboro, of which 12 (30.8% vs. 31.7% countywide) were registered as Democrats, 10 (25.6% vs. 21.1%) were registered as Republicans and 17 (43.6% vs. 47.1%) were registered as Unaffiliated. There were no voters registered to other parties. Among the borough's 2010 Census population, 58.2% (vs. 57.1% in Bergen County) were registered to vote, including 76.5% of those ages 18 and over (vs. 73.7% countywide).

Gubernatorial election results for Teterboro
Year	Republican		Democratic		Third party(ies)	
Year	No.	%	No.	%	No.	%
2025	11	78.57%	3	21.43%	0	0.00%
2021	8	72.73%	3	27.27%	0	0.00%
2017	7	43.75%	9	56.25%	0	0.00%
2013	10	55.56%	3	16.67%	5	27.78%
2009	10	50.00%	6	30.00%	4	20.00%
2005	3	15.79%	11	57.89%	5	26.32%

In the 2016 presidential election, Democrat Hillary Clinton received 13 votes (50.0% vs. 54.2% countywide) as did Republican Donald Trump with 13 votes (50.0% vs. 41.1%) and other candidates with zero votes (0% vs. 4.6%), among the 26 ballots cast by the borough's 41 registered voters, for a turnout of 63.4% (vs. 72.5% in Bergen County). In the 2012 presidential election, Democrat Barack Obama received 14 votes (58.3% vs. 54.8% countywide), ahead of Republican Mitt Romney with 9 votes (37.5% vs. 43.5%) and other candidates with one vote (4.2% vs. 0.9%), among the 24 ballots cast by the borough's 43 registered voters, for a turnout of 55.8% (vs. 70.4% in Bergen County). In the 2008 presidential election, Republican John McCain received 13 votes (52.0% vs. 44.5% countywide), ahead of Democrat Barack Obama with 12 votes (48.0% vs. 53.9%), among the 25 ballots cast by the borough's 34 registered voters, for a turnout of 73.5% (vs. 76.8% in Bergen County). In the 2004 presidential election, Democrat John Kerry received 14 votes (56.0% vs. 51.7% countywide), ahead of Republican George W. Bush with 8 votes (32.0% vs. 47.2%) and other candidates with 2 votes (8.0% vs. 0.7%), among the 25 ballots cast by the borough's 36 registered voters, for a turnout of 69.4% (vs. 76.9% in the whole county).

United States presidential election results for Teterboro 2024 2020 2016 2012 2008 2004
Year	Republican		Democratic		Third party(ies)	
Year	No.	%	No.	%	No.	%
2024	18	78.26%	4	17.39%	1	4.35%
2020	16	57.14%	12	42.86%	0	0.00%
2016	13	50.00%	13	50.00%	0	0.00%
2012	9	37.50%	14	58.33%	1	4.17%
2008	13	52.00%	12	48.00%	0	0.00%
2004	8	33.33%	14	58.33%	2	8.33%

In the 2013 gubernatorial election, Republican Chris Christie received 55.6% of the vote (10 cast), ahead of Democrat Barbara Buono with 16.7% (3 votes), and other candidates with 27.8% (5 votes), among the 14 ballots cast by the borough's 36 registered voters for a turnout of 38.9%. In the 2009 gubernatorial election, Republican Chris Christie received 10 votes (50.0% vs. 45.8% countywide), ahead of Democrat Jon Corzine with 6 votes (30.0% vs. 48.0%) and Independent Chris Daggett with 3 votes (15.0% vs. 4.7%), among the 20 ballots cast by the borough's 35 registered voters, yielding a 57.1% turnout (vs. 50.0% in the county).

United States Senate election results for Teterboro1
Year	Republican		Democratic		Third party(ies)	
Year	No.	%	No.	%	No.	%
2024	18	78.26%	4	17.39%	1	4.35%
2018	9	47.37%	10	52.63%	0	0.00%
2012	7	38.89%	10	55.56%	1	5.56%
2006	8	44.44%	8	44.44%	2	11.11%

United States Senate election results for Teterboro2
Year	Republican		Democratic		Third party(ies)	
Year	No.	%	No.	%	No.	%
2020	13	50.00%	13	50.00%	0	0.00%
2014	9	50.00%	7	38.89%	2	11.11%
2013	3	25.00%	7	58.33%	2	16.67%
2008	7	41.18%	9	52.94%	1	5.88%

== Education ==
The municipality is part of the Hasbrouck Heights School District, which serves public school students in pre-kindergarten through twelfth grade from Hasbrouck Heights and from Teterboro. As of the 2020–21 school year, the district, comprised of four schools, had an enrollment of 1,745 students and 145.0 classroom teachers (on an FTE basis), for a student–teacher ratio of 12.0:1. Schools in the district (with 2020–21 enrollment data from the National Center for Education Statistics) are Euclid Elementary School with 338 students in grades Pre-K–5, Lincoln Elementary School with 386 students in grades Pre-K–5, Hasbrouck Heights Middle School with 426 students in grades 6–8 and Hasbrouck Heights High School with 558 students in grades 9–12.

Previously, the municipality was in the Teterboro School District, a non-operating district (a school district that does not operate any schools). The Teterboro district was dissolved on July 1, 2010, and merged into the Hasbrouck Heights School District. Prior to July 2010, public school students in Kindergarten through eighth grade attended Memorial School in South Hackensack, as part of a sending/receiving relationship with the South Hackensack School District. High school students then had an option to attend Hackensack High School of the Hackensack Public Schools, the receiving district for South Hackensack students, or Hasbrouck Heights High School. Teterboro students already enrolled in South Hackensack or Hackensack schools, prior to July 2010, were given the option to remain in those schools.

Public school students from the borough, and all of Bergen County, are eligible to attend the secondary education programs offered by the Bergen County Technical Schools, which include Bergen County Academies in Hackensack, Bergen County Technical High School, Teterboro Campus and Bergen County Technical High School, Paramus Campus. The district offers programs on a shared-time or full-time basis, with admission based on a selective application process and tuition covered by the student's home school district.

== Transportation ==
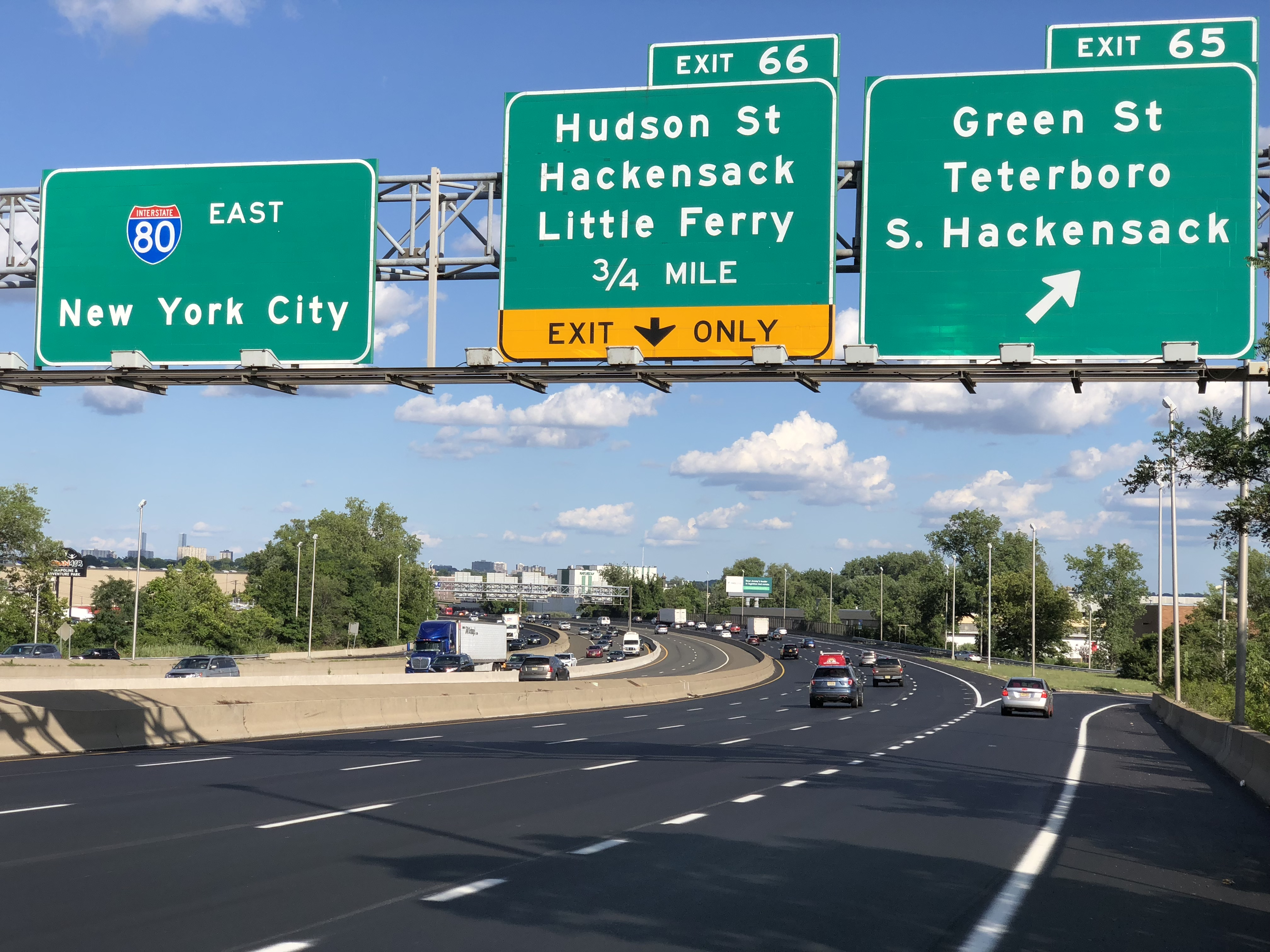
Interstate 80 eastbound on the border of South Hackensack and Teterboro

=== Roads and highways ===
As of May 2010, the borough had a total of 4.65 miles (7.48 km) of roadways, of which 3.28 miles (5.28 km) were maintained by the municipality, 0.30 miles (0.48 km) by Bergen County and 1.07 miles (1.72 km) by the New Jersey Department of Transportation.

U.S. Route 46 travels east–west through Teterboro to the north of Teterboro Airport, while a small piece of Interstate 80 travels along the northern edge of the borough. Route 17 travels parallel to the Hasbrouck Heights – Teterboro border on the Hasbrouck Heights side.

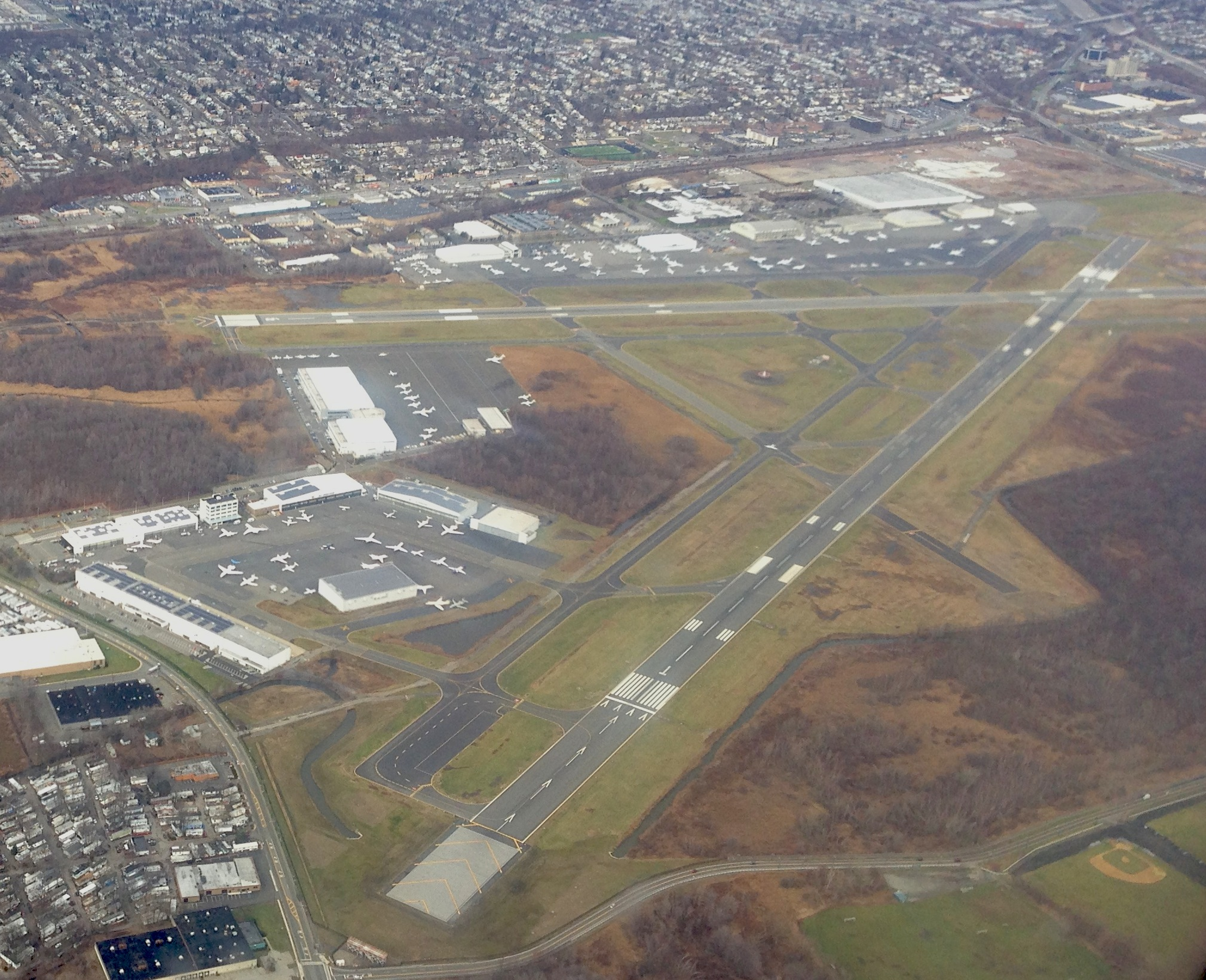
Teterboro Airport is owned and operated by the Port Authority of New York and New Jersey.

=== Public transportation ===
Teterboro is served by NJ Transit at the Teterboro train station, located on Williams Avenue near Route 17. The station offers service on the Pascack Valley Line, which runs north–south to Hoboken Terminal with connections via the Secaucus Junction transfer station to New Jersey Transit one-stop service to New York Penn Station and to other NJ Transit rail service, and at Hoboken Terminal to other New Jersey Transit rail lines, the PATH train at the Hoboken PATH station, New York Waterways ferry service to the World Financial Center and other destinations and Hudson-Bergen Light Rail service.

NJ Transit provides bus service on the 161 (on Route 46), 164 and 165 routes to the Port Authority Bus Terminal in Midtown Manhattan, to Newark on the 76 route, with local service on the 772 route.

== Sources ==
- Municipal Incorporations of the State of New Jersey (according to Counties) prepared by the Division of Local Government, Department of the Treasury (New Jersey); December 1, 1958.
- Clayton, W. Woodford; and Nelson, William. History of Bergen and Passaic Counties, New Jersey, with Biographical Sketches of Many of its Pioneers and Prominent Men., Philadelphia: Everts and Peck, 1882.
- Harvey, Cornelius Burnham (ed.), Genealogical History of Hudson and Bergen Counties, New Jersey. New York: New Jersey Genealogical Publishing Co., 1900.
- Van Valen, James M. History of Bergen County, New Jersey. New York: New Jersey Publishing and Engraving Co., 1900.
- Westervelt, Frances A. (Frances Augusta), 1858–1942, History of Bergen County, New Jersey, 1630–1923, Lewis Historical Publishing Company, 1923.
