= 1983 New Jersey Senate election =

1983 New Jersey Senate elections
- November 8, 1983

All 40 seats in the New Jersey State Senate 21 seats needed for a majority
- Turnout: 48% (▼16pp)
	Majority party	Minority party
Leader	Carmen A. Orechio	Donald DiFrancesco
Party	Democratic	Republican
Leader since	January 10, 1978	January 12, 1982
Leader's seat	13th (Nutley)	22nd (Warren Township)
Last election	22	18
Seats before	21	19
Seats won	23	17
Seat change	▲2	▼2
- Results by district Democratic hold Democratic gain Republican hold Republican gain
Senate President before election
Carmen A. Orechio
Democratic
Elected Senate President
Carmen A. Orechio
Democratic

The 1983 New Jersey Senate election was held on November 8. The election took place mid-way through the first term of Governor Thomas Kean. Democrats gained a net of two seats after flipping the 11th, 13th, and 38th districts. Meanwhile, Republicans flipped the 18th.

Contents
Incumbents not running • Summary of results
By District: 1 • 2 • 3 • 4 • 5 • 6 • 7 • 8 • 9 • 10 • 11 • 12 • 13 • 14 • 15 • 16 • 17 • 18 • 19 • 20 • 21 • 22 • 23 • 24 • 25 • 26 • 27 • 28 • 29 • 30 • 31 • 32 • 33 • 34 • 35 • 36 • 37 • 38 • 39 • 40

== Incumbents not running for re-election ==
=== Democratic ===
- Herman T. Costello (District 7)
- Frank E. Rodgers (District 32)
- Nicholas LaRocca (District 33) (ran for Assembly)

== Summary of results by State Senate district ==
District	Incumbent	Party	Elected Senator	Party
1st Legislative District	James R. Hurley	Rep	James R. Hurley	Rep
2nd Legislative District	William Gormley (Note: Gormley won a September 1982 special election to complete the unexpired term of Senator Steven P. Perskie, who resigned to become a judge of the New Jersey Superior Court.)	Rep	William Gormley	Rep
3rd Legislative District	Raymond Zane	Dem	Raymond Zane	Dem
4th Legislative District	Daniel Dalton	Dem	Daniel Dalton	Dem
5th Legislative District	Walter Rand	Dem	Walter Rand	Dem
6th Legislative District	Lee Laskin	Rep	Lee Laskin	Rep
7th Legislative District	Herman T. Costello	Dem	Catherine A. Costa	Dem
8th Legislative District	Jim Saxton	Rep	Jim Saxton	Rep
9th Legislative District	Leonard T. Connors	Rep	Leonard T. Connors	Rep
10th Legislative District	John F. Russo	Dem	John F. Russo	Dem
11th Legislative District	Brian T. Kennedy	Rep	Frank Pallone	Dem
12th Legislative District	S. Thomas Gagliano	Rep	S. Thomas Gagliano	Rep
13th Legislative District	John P. Gallagher	Rep	Richard Van Wagner	Dem
14th Legislative District	Francis J. McManimon	Dem	Francis J. McManimon	Dem
15th Legislative District	Gerald R. Stockman	Dem	Gerald R. Stockman	Dem
16th Legislative District	John H. Ewing	Rep	John H. Ewing	Rep
17th Legislative District	John A. Lynch Jr.	Dem	John A. Lynch Jr.	Dem
18th Legislative District	James Bornheimer	Dem	Peter P. Garibaldi	Rep
19th Legislative District	Laurence Weiss	Dem	Laurence Weiss	Dem
20th Legislative District	Raymond Lesniak	Dem	Raymond Lesniak	Dem
21st Legislative District	C. Louis Bassano	Rep	C. Louis Bassano	Rep
22nd Legislative District	Donald DiFrancesco	Rep	Donald DiFrancesco	Rep
23rd Legislative District	Walter E. Foran	Rep	Walter E. Foran	Rep
24th Legislative District	Wayne Dumont	Rep	Wayne Dumont	Rep
25th Legislative District	John H. Dorsey	Rep	John H. Dorsey	Rep
26th Legislative District	James P. Vreeland	Rep	Leanna Brown	Rep
27th Legislative District	Richard Codey	Dem	Richard Codey	Dem
28th Legislative District	John P. Caufield	Dem	John P. Caufield	Dem
29th Legislative District	Wynona Lipman	Dem	Wynona Lipman	Dem
30th Legislative District	Carmen Orechio	Dem	Carmen Orechio	Dem
31st Legislative District	Edward T. O'Connor Jr.	Dem	Edward T. O'Connor Jr.	Dem
32nd Legislative District	Frank E. Rodgers	Dem	Thomas F. Cowan	Dem
33rd Legislative District	Nicholas LaRocca	Dem	Christopher Jackman	Dem
34th Legislative District	Joseph Bubba	Rep	Joseph Bubba	Rep
35th Legislative District	Frank X. Graves Jr.	Dem	Frank X. Graves Jr.	Dem
36th Legislative District	Joseph Hirkala	Dem	Joseph Hirkala	Dem
37th Legislative District	Matthew Feldman	Dem	Matthew Feldman	Dem
38th Legislative District	John Paolella	Rep	Paul Contillo	Dem
39th Legislative District	Gerald Cardinale	Rep	Gerald Cardinale	Rep
40th Legislative District	Garrett Hagedorn	Rep	Garrett Hagedorn	Rep

=== Close races ===
Seats where the margin of victory was under 10%:

1. District 21, 1.0%
2. District 18, 1.2% gain
3. District 38, 1.4% gain
4. District 12, 1.8%
5. District 11, 1.9% gain
6. District 34, 2.0%
7. District 39, 2.4%
8. District 13, 8.2% gain
9. District 30, 9.6%

== District 1 ==
=== General election ===
==== Candidates ====
- James R. Hurley, incumbent Senator since 1982 (Republican)
- Christopher H. Riley (Democratic)

==== Results ====
1983 general election
Party	Candidate	Votes	%	±%
Republican	James R. Hurley (incumbent)	30,141	59.8%	▲6.0
Democratic	Christopher H. Riley	20,232	40.2%	▼6.0
Total votes		50,373	100.00%	

== District 2 ==
=== Democratic primary ===
==== Candidates ====
- Arlene Groch, lawyer

===== Declined =====
- Steven P. Perskie, former Senator (accepted Superior Court judgeship)

=== General election ===
==== Candidates ====
- William Gormley, incumbent Senator since 1982 (Republican)
- Arlene Groch, lawyer (Democratic)
- James T. Hagen (Senate Independent)

==== Results ====
1983 general election
Party	Candidate	Votes	%	±%
Republican	William Gormley (incumbent)	27,616	56.8%	▼15.5
Democratic	Arlene Groch	19,937	41.0%	▲16.0
Independent politician	James T. Hagen	1,062	2.2%	▲1.3
Total votes		48,615	100.00%	

== District 3 ==
=== General election ===
==== Candidates ====
- Mary Ruth Talley (Republican)
- Raymond Zane, incumbent Senator since 1974 (Democratic)

==== Results ====
1983 general election
Party	Candidate	Votes	%	±%
Democratic	Raymond Zane (incumbent)	30,179	63.0%	▼0.2
Republican	Mary Ruth Talley	17,743	37.0%	▲0.2
Total votes		47,922	100.00%	

== District 4 ==
=== General election ===
==== Candidates ====
- Daniel Dalton, incumbent Senator since 1982 (Democratic)
- Christopher Michaele (Republican)

==== Results ====
1983 general election
Party	Candidate	Votes	%	±%
Democratic	Daniel Dalton (incumbent)	21,891	63.9%	▲0.6
Republican	Christopher Michaele	12,379	36.1%	▼0.6
Total votes		34,270	100.00%	

== District 5 ==
=== General election ===
==== Candidates ====
- Gregory B. Montgomery (Democratic)
- Walter Rand, incumbent Senator since 1982 (Democratic)

==== Results ====
1983 general election
Party	Candidate	Votes	%	±%
Democratic	Walter Rand (incumbent)	23,446	66.0%	▼6.0
Republican	Gregory B. Montgomery	12,090	34.0%	▲6.0
Total votes		35,536	100.00%	

== District 6 ==
=== General election ===
==== Candidates ====
- Lee B. Laskin, incumbent Senator since 1978 (Republican)
- Francis J. Ward (Democratic)

==== Results ====
1983 general election
Party	Candidate	Votes	%	±%
Republican	Lee B. Laskin (incumbent)	29,783	63.3%	▲6.6
Democratic	Francis J. Ward	17,235	36.7%	▼6.6
Total votes		47,018	100.00%	

== District 7 ==
=== Democratic primary ===
==== Candidates ====
- Catherine A. Costa, Assemblywoman from Willingboro and Burlington County Freeholder
- Barbara Kalik, Assemblywoman from Willingboro

==== Campaign ====
The race between Costa and Kalik, both Assemblywomen from Willingboro, was expected to be among the most competitive in the state. Though Kalik, who had served since 1977, was better known in Trenton, Costa also served as a Freeholder and was the top vote-getter on the 1981 ticket.

=== General election ===
==== Candidates ====
- Catherine A. Costa, Assemblywoman from Willingboro and Burlington County Freeholder (Democratic)
- Henry W. Metzger (Republican)

==== Results ====
1983 general election
Party	Candidate	Votes	%	±%
Democratic	Catherine A. Costa	26,697	63.1%	▲6.0
Republican	Henry W. Metzger	15,616	36.9%	▼6.0
Total votes		42,313	100.00%	

== District 8 ==
=== General election ===
==== Candidates ====
- Charles H. Ryan (Democratic)
- Jim Saxton, incumbent Senator since 1982 (Republican)

==== Results ====
1983 general election
Party	Candidate	Votes	%	±%
Republican	Jim Saxton (incumbent)	22,714	63.1%	▼2.6
Democratic	Charles H. Ryan	13,303	36.9%	▲2.6
Total votes		36,017	100.00%	

== District 9 ==
=== General election ===
==== Candidates ====
- Leonard T. Connors, incumbent Senator since 1982 and mayor of Surf City (Republican)
- Anthony M. Sellitto Jr. (Democratic)

==== Results ====
1983 general election
Party	Candidate	Votes	%	±%
Republican	Leonard T. Connors (incumbent)	31,028	63.3	▼1.1
Democratic	Anthony M. Sellitto, Jr.	17,989	36.7	▲1.1
Total votes		49,017	100.00%	

== District 10 ==
=== General election ===
==== Candidates ====
- Bob Fall (Republican)
- John F. Russo, incumbent Senator since 1974 (Democratic)

==== Results ====
1983 general election
Party	Candidate	Votes	%	±%
Democratic	John F. Russo (incumbent)	31,807	63.3	▲4.7
Republican	Bob Fall	18,413	36.7	▼4.7
Total votes		50,220	100.00%	

== District 11 ==
=== General election ===
==== Candidates ====
- Brian T. Kennedy, incumbent Senator since 1978 (Republican)
- Frank Pallone, member of the Long Branch City Council (Democratic)
- Edgar Van Houten (Bull Moose)

==== Results ====
1983 general election
Party	Candidate	Votes	%	±%
Democratic	Frank Pallone	24,339	50.4%	▲9.3
Republican	Brian T. Kennedy (incumbent)	23,412	48.5%	▼9.3
Bull Moose	Edgar Van Houten	508	1.1%	N/A
Total votes		48,259	100.00%	

== District 12 ==
=== General election ===
==== Candidates ====
- S. Thomas Gagliano, incumbent Senator since 1978 (Republican)
- Alexander D. Lehrer, Monmouth County Prosecutor (Democratic)

===== Withdrew =====
- Robert Morgan, doctor (Democratic)

==== Campaign ====
Robert Morgan, the original Democratic nominee, withdrew from the race, citing the pressure of his medical practice.

County Prosecutor Alexander Lehrer, the most prominent public official in the county, was initially reluctant to run, worrying that a political campaign had little chance of success and could imperil his ambitions for the state judiciary. Party chair John Fiorino and U.S. Representative James J. Howard recruited him into the race through a draft movement; their support would also be critical to any judicial appointment.

Gagliano denied reports that he had implied Lehrer's campaign would threaten his confirmation to the judiciary in the Senate.

==== Results ====
1983 general election
Party	Candidate	Votes	%	±%
Republican	S. Thomas Gagliano (incumbent)	24,294	50.9%	▼8.2
Democratic	Alexander D. Lehrer	23,414	49.1%	▲8.2
Total votes		47,708	100.00%	

== District 13 ==
=== General election ===
==== Candidates ====
- John P. Gallagher, incumbent Senator since 1982 (Republican)
- Richard Van Wagner, Assemblyman from Middletown Township (Democratic)

==== Results ====
1983 general election
Party	Candidate	Votes	%	±%
Democratic	Richard Van Wagner	26,522	54.1%	▲5.7
Republican	John P. Gallagher (incumbent)	22,508	45.9%	▼5.7
Total votes		49,030	100.00%	

== District 14 ==
=== General election ===
==== Candidates ====
- Charles B. W. Durand, former mayor of Franklin Township (Republican)
- Francis J. McManimon, incumbent Senator since 1982 (Democratic)

==== Results ====
1983 general election
Party	Candidate	Votes	%	±%
Democratic	Francis J. McManimon (incumbent)	30,376	63.5%	▲5.8
Republican	Charles B. W. Durand	17,448	36.5%	▼5.8
Total votes		47,824	100.00%	

== District 15 ==
=== General election ===
==== Candidates ====
- Robert A. Gladstone (Republican)
- Gerald R. Stockman, incumbent Senator since 1982 (Democratic)

==== Results ====
1983 general election
Party	Candidate	Votes	%	±%
Democratic	Gerald R. Stockman (incumbent)	29,967	67.3%	▲10.9
Republican	Robert A. Gladstone	14,543	32.7%	▼10.9
Total votes		44,510	100.00%	

== District 16 ==
=== General election ===
==== Candidates ====
- John H. Ewing, incumbent Senator since 1978 (Republican)
- Alfred A. Wicklund (Democratic)

==== Results ====
1983 general election
Party	Candidate	Votes	%	±%
Republican	John H. Ewing (incumbent)	27,383	67.4%	▲1.9
Democratic	Alfred A. Wicklund	13,242	32.6%	▼1.9
Total votes		40,625	100.00%	

== District 17 ==
=== General election ===
==== Candidates ====
- John A. Lynch Jr., incumbent Senator since 1982 and mayor of New Brunswick (Democratic)
- Frank A. Santoro (Republican)

==== Results ====
1983 general election
Party	Candidate	Votes	%	±%
Democratic	John A. Lynch Jr. (incumbent)	19,703	65.3%	▲4.7
Republican	Frank A. Santoro	10,449	34.7%	▼1.2
Total votes		30,152	100.00%	

== District 18 ==
=== General election ===
==== Candidates ====
- James Bornheimer, incumbent Senator since 1982
- Peter P. Garibaldi, former Assemblyman and mayor of Monroe Township (Republican)
- Robert S. Maurer, Edison resident (Independent)

==== Campaign ====
Garibaldi stressed the issue of auto insurance premiums, which he said remained unsatisfactorily high despite recent legislation to slow rate increases. He also cited his opposition to property revaluation programs in several towns, including Monroe and East Brunswick, which shifted local property tax burdens from commercial to residential property owners. Garibaldi said he had gone to court to stop the Monroe revaluation over disagreements with the group hired to conduct the survey.

==== Results ====
1983 general election
Party	Candidate	Votes	%	±%
Republican	Peter P. Garibaldi	24,397	47.9%	0.0
Democratic	James W. Bornheimer (incumbent)	23,814	46.7%	▼5.4
Independent	Robert S. Maurer	2,769	5.4%	N/A
Total votes		50,980	100.00%	

== District 19 ==
=== General election ===
==== Candidates ====
- James W. Inman (Republican)
- Laurence S. Weiss, incumbent Senator since 1978 (Democratic)

==== Results ====
1983 general election
Party	Candidate	Votes	%	±%
Democratic	Laurence S. Weiss (incumbent)	28,251	59.0	▼1.4
Republican	James W. Inman	19,603	41.0	▲1.4
Total votes		47,854	100.00%	

== District 20 ==
=== Democratic primary ===
==== Candidates ====
- John Brady, Elizabeth resident
- Rocco Gallo, Elizabeth resident
- Joseph M. Hartnett, Rahway resident
- Raymond Lesniak, Assemblyman from Elizabeth

==== Results ====
Alongside the primary election, Lesniak won a special election to complete the unexpired term of John T. Gregorio, who had been convicted of conspiring to conceal his ownership of two Linden taverns.

=== General election ===
==== Candidates ====
- Raymond Lesniak, incumbent Senator since June 1983 (Democratic)
- Rose Zeidwerg Monyek, Rahway resident (Inflation Fighting Housewife)
- Alfred D. Palermo, Linden Republican chairman and real estate businessman (Republican)
- Joseph P. Scanlon (Beam the Bomb)
- Harold J. Young, Rahway resident (Independent)

==== Results ====
1983 general election
Party	Candidate	Votes	%	±%
Democratic	Raymond Lesniak (incumbent)	23,246	64.5%	▼0.6
Republican	Alfred D. Palermo	11,868	32.9%	▲5.4
Inflation Fighting Housewife	Rose Zeidwerg Monyek	389	1.1%	▼2.4
Beam the Bomb	Joseph P. Scanlon	305	0.8%	N/A
Independent	Harold J. Young	217	0.6%	▼3.3
Total votes		36,025	100.00%	

== District 21 ==
=== General election ===
==== Candidates ====
- C. Louis Bassano, incumbent Senator since 1982 (Republican)
- Anthony E. Russo, former Senator (Democratic)

==== Results ====
1983 general election
Party	Candidate	Votes	%	±%
Republican	C. Louis Bassano (incumbent)	29,300	50.5%	▼1.4
Democratic	Anthony E. Russo	28,734	49.5%	▲1.4
Total votes		58,034	100.00%	

== District 22 ==
=== General election ===
==== Candidates ====
- Donald DiFrancesco, incumbent Senator since 1979 (Republican)
- Thomas M. McCormack (Democratic)

==== Results ====
1983 general election
Party	Candidate	Votes	%	±%
Republican	Donald DiFrancesco (incumbent)	29,005	66.6%	▼1.3
Democratic	Thomas M. McCormack	14,576	33.4%	▲1.3
Total votes		43,581	100.00%	

== District 23 ==
=== General election ===
==== Candidates ====
- Walter E. Foran, incumbent Senator since 1977 (Republican)
- William Martin Jr. (Democratic)

==== Results ====
1983 general election
Party	Candidate	Votes	%	±%
Republican	Walter E. Foran (incumbent)	27,224	69.2%	▼5.9
Democratic	William Martin, Jr.	12,101	30.8%	▲5.9
Total votes		39,325	100.00%	

== District 24 ==
=== General election ===
==== Candidates ====
- Wayne Dumont, incumbent Senator since 1968 (Note: Dumont previously served in the Senate from 1952 to 1966.) (Republican)
- Clarence W. Sickles (Democratic)

==== Results ====
1983 general election
Party	Candidate	Votes	%	±%
Republican	Wayne Dumont (incumbent)	29,279	75.6%	▼1.8
Democratic	Clarence W. Sickles	9,431	24.4%	▲1.8
Total votes		38,710	100.00%	

== District 25 ==
=== General election ===
==== Candidates ====
- John H. Dorsey, incumbent Senator since 1978 (Republican)
- Allen Hantman (Democratic)

==== Results ====
1983 general election
Party	Candidate	Votes	%	±%
Republican	John H. Dorsey (incumbent)	25,529	65.4%	▼2.6
Democratic	Allen Hantman	13,524	34.6%	▲2.6
Total votes		39,053	100.0	

== District 26 ==
=== Republican primary ===
==== Campaign ====
- Leanna Brown, Assemblywoman from Chatham Township
- James P. Vreeland, incumbent Senator since 1974

==== Campaign ====
Brown announced her campaign in March, claiming that she was running on economic issues rather than in opposition to Vreeland, who had been her running mate since 1980. The seat had been expected to go to Assemblyman Dean Gallo of Parsippany on Vreeland's retirement. Brown called for "new ideas", a veiled jab at the 73-year old Vreeland. Her campaign out-raised and out-advertised Vreeland.

=== General election ===
==== Candidates ====
- Leanna Brown, Assemblywoman from Chatham Township (Republican)
- Anthony Calvino (Democratic)

==== Results ====
1983 general election
Party	Candidate	Votes	%	±%
Republican	Leanna Brown	24,348	68.2%	▼1.7
Democratic	Anthony Calvino	11,342	31.8%	▲1.7
Total votes		35,690	100.00%	

== District 27 ==
=== Democratic primary ===
==== Candidates ====
- Alan Bowser, East Orange resident
- Richard Codey, incumbent Senator since 1982
- Russell Fox, East Orange resident
- Joel Shain, mayor of Orange
- Thelma I. Tyree, East Orange resident

==== Campaign ====
In the primary, each candidate accused the other of conflicts of interest. Shain charged that Codey sponsored multiple bills relating to the insurance industry while earning money as a consultant from insurance companies. Codey charged that Shain earned large dividends from stock in a cable television company which was awarded a franchise to operate in Orange. Shain had abstained from voting on the contract and sold his shares before the primary election.

Shain spent close to $250,000 on radio commercials and telephone banking, while Codey spent over $115,000, setting a record for campaign spending.

=== General election ===
==== Candidates ====
- James J. Brown (Democratic)
- Richard Codey, incumbent Senator since 1982 (Democratic)

==== Results ====
1983 general election
Party	Candidate	Votes	%	±%
Democratic	Richard Codey (incumbent)	18,943	75.2%	▲1.3
Republican	James J. Brown	6,255	24.8%	▼1.3
Total votes		25,198	100.00%	

== District 28 ==
=== Democratic primary ===
==== Candidates ====
- Anthony Carrino, Newark City Councilman
- John P. Caufield, incumbent Senator since 1979 and Newark Fire Director

==== Campaign ====
Carrino challenged Caufield, who had served two terms and was a close ally of Newark mayor Kenneth A. Gibson. During the prior legislative session, Caufield had blocked a bill supported by the city council that would have reformed school board elections in Newark. The contest was framed as a struggle between the mayor and the city council for power.

=== General election ===
==== Candidates ====
- John P. Caufield, incumbent Senator since 1979 and Newark Fire Director (Democratic)
- Joseph N. Mastrangelo (Republican)

==== Results ====
1983 general election
Party	Candidate	Votes	%	±%
Democratic	John P. Caufield (incumbent)	11,829	72.9%	▼2.1
Republican	Joseph N. Mastrangelo	4,392	27.1%	▲2.1
Total votes		16,221	100.00%	

== District 29 ==
=== General election ===
==== Candidates ====
- Willie M. Brascher (Republican)
- Wynona Lipman, incumbent Senator since 1972 (Democratic)

==== Results ====
1983 general election
Party	Candidate	Votes	%	±%
Democratic	Wynona Lipman (incumbent)	12,906	85.5	▼2.8
Republican	Willie M. Brascher	2,182	14.5	▲2.8
Total votes		15,088	100.00%	

== District 30 ==
=== General election ===
==== Candidates ====
- Carmen A. Orechio, incumbent Senator since 1974, President of the New Jersey Senate, and mayor of Nutley (Democratic)
- Ralph J. Salerno, Bloomfield lawyer (Republican)
- Martin G. Scaturo, former Essex County Freeholder (Regular Organization)

==== Campaign ====
The 30th district in suburban Essex County was among the most highly contested in the state, due to Orechio's position as President of the New Jersey Senate and the most powerful Democrat in Trenton. Governor Thomas Kean, a native of Essex, had carried the district by more than 3,000 votes in 1981, while Orechio was re-elected by slightly more than 1,000. Orechio, who was also the mayor of Nutley, hoped that the increased attention on the Senate race in an off-year and a special election for Nutley council would boost his vote.

Salerno, a first-time candidate for office, campaigned on a strong anti-crime position including tougher prison sentences, support of the Governor's proposed infrastructure bank, and opposition to the Mount Laurel doctrine of the New Jersey Supreme Court. Though he now lived in Bloomfield, he stressed his working class roots in Belleville. Down the stretch, the Republican campaign turned negative, attacking Orechio in personal terms while trying to establish Salerno's credentials for office. Among the issues cited was Orechio's control of the North Jersey District Water Supply Commission, which his brother Carl, a former Republican Assemblyman, chaired at a salary of $6,000 per year. Another Orechio brother, Frank, received a $54,000 salary as program director for the Wanaque South Water Project. Orechio called the attacks on his brothers "sleazy" and disclaimed any role in their work, noting that appointments were made by the Governor. (The appointments were also confirmed by the Senate.) He refused to appear on a campaign platform with Salerno until he received an apology.

Salerno spent over $110,000 by late October, while Orechio spent over $87,000. Former Democratic Freeholder Martin G. Scaturo ran in the race as an independent candidate.

==== Results ====
1983 general election
Party	Candidate	Votes	%	±%
Democratic	Carmen A. Orechio (incumbent)	28,613	53.8%	▲4.4
Republican	Ralph J. Salerno	23,523	44.2%	▼3.5
Regular Organization	Martin G. Scaturo	1,061	2.0%	N/A
Total votes		53,197	100.00%	

Reacting to the results, Orechio said, "They had the money, the big money. But we had the people, and that's what really counted."

== District 31 ==
=== General election ===
==== Candidates ====
- Helen Kozak (Republican)
- Edward T. O'Connor Jr., incumbent Senator since 1982 (Democratic)

==== Results ====
1983 general election
Party	Candidate	Votes	%	±%
Democratic	Edward T. O'Connor Jr. (incumbent)	23,894	80.7%	▲5.3
Republican	Helen Kozak	5,698	19.3%	▼5.3
Total votes		29,592	100.00%	

== District 32 ==
=== Democratic primary ===
==== Candidates ====
- Thomas F. Cowan, Assemblyman from Jersey City
- Anthony R. Cucci, former Jersey City councilman

==== Campaign ====
The three Hudson County district primaries were part of a struggle for power between Jersey City mayor Gerald McCann and former mayor Thomas F. X. Smith, who ran for Hudson County Executive against incumbent Edward F. Clark.

Cowan was backed by McCann, replacing incumbent Francis E. Rodgers on his slate. Cucci was backed by Smith.

Late in the campaign, Cucci was endorsed by U.S. Senator Frank Lautenberg, whom he had supported in 1982.

=== General election ===
==== Candidates ====
- Thomas F. Cowan, Assemblyman from Jersey City (Democratic)
- Joseph A. Plonski (Republican)
- Herbert H. Shaw, perennial candidate from North Bergen (Politicians Are Crooks)

==== Results ====
1983 general election
Party	Candidate	Votes	%	±%
Democratic	Thomas F. Cowan	23,510	63.8%	▲0.4
Republican	Joseph A. Plonski	11,997	32.6%	▼1.8
Politicians Are Crooks	Herbert H. Shaw	1,318	3.6	▲1.4
Total votes		36,825	100.00%	

== District 33 ==
=== Democratic primary ===
==== Candidates ====
- Christopher Jackman, Speaker of the General Assembly from West New York
- Joseph Simunovich, Hudson County Freeholder from West New York

==== Campaign ====
The three Hudson County district primaries were part of a struggle for power between Jersey City mayor Gerald McCann and former mayor Thomas F. X. Smith, who ran for Hudson County Executive against incumbent Edward F. Clark.

Jackman was backed by Smith, while Simunovich was backed by McCann. The race was considered "a tight one" by The New York Times.

Late in the campaign, Jackman was endorsed by U.S. Senator Frank Lautenberg, whom he had supported in 1982.

=== General election ===
==== Candidates ====
- Christopher Jackman, Speaker of the General Assembly from West New York (Democratic)
- Carlos E. Munoz, candidate for General Assembly in 1981 (Republican)

==== Results ====
1983 general election
Party	Candidate	Votes	%	±%
Democratic	Christopher Jackman	18,916	66.5%	▲15.7
Republican	Carlos E. Munoz	9,532	33.5%	▲15.7 (▲23.4)
Total votes		28,448	100.00%	

== District 34 ==
=== Republican primary ===
==== Candidates ====
- Joseph Bubba, incumbent Senator since 1982
- S.M. Terry LaCorte, Assemblyman from Clifton

==== Campaign ====
Given the Democratic lean of the district and a potential match-up with James W. Roe, Republican leaders feared a lingering split in the party could lead to a loss in November.

=== General election ===
==== Candidates ====
- Joseph Bubba, incumbent Senator since 1982 (Republican)
- James W. Roe, Passaic County Freeholder and brother of U.S. Representative Robert A. Roe (Democratic)

==== Campaign ====
Bubba campaigned on a claim that he had single-handedly blocked efforts by Governor Kean for a 5-cent per gallon gas tax in 1982. Despite this, Kean supported his campaign.

Roe was likewise critical of his own party, referring to the "foot-dragging Legislature" and criticizing the slow pace of legislative negotiations on automobile insurance. He avoided criticism of Kean, who remained popular in the district.

==== Results ====
1983 general election
Party	Candidate	Votes	%	±%
Republican	Joseph Bubba (incumbent)	23,993	51.0%	▼1.7
Democratic	James W. Roe	23,019	49.0%	▲1.7
Total votes		47,012	100.00%	

== District 35 ==
=== General election ===
==== Candidates ====
- Richard Fontanella (Republican)
- Frank X. Graves Jr., incumbent Senator since 1978 and mayor of Paterson (Democratic)

==== Results ====
1983 general election
Party	Candidate	Votes	%	±%
Democratic	Frank X. Graves Jr. (incumbent)	23,646	74.3%	▼0.3
Republican	Richard Fontanella	8,161	25.7%	▲0.3
Total votes		31,807	100.00%	

== District 36 ==
=== General election ===
==== Candidates ====
- Joseph Hirkala, incumbent Senator since 1972 and Passaic City Clerk (Democratic)
- Joseph F. Job, former Bergen County Sheriff (Republican)

==== Campaign ====
Both candidates had switched parties in the past. Job, who had been a Republican in the 1960s, had spent the last decade as a member of the Democratic Party and served as the campaign manager for the Democratic Assembly ticket in 1981. As a result, he stayed out of the Assembly race, claiming that voters "[were] fortunate in having four good men to choose from." In radio commercials, Hirkala highlighted Job's penchant for switching parties.

With party loyalties blurred, the campaign turned bitterly personal, despite the friendship between the two candidates. Job referred to Hirkala as a "do-nothing" clerk, and Hirkala charged that Job had failed to prevent prison escapes and drug use by inmates as Bergen County Sheriff.

Hirkala planned to raise and spend $45,000, most of it from the New Jersey State Democratic Committee. Both candidates utilized radio commercials.

==== Results ====
1983 general election
Party	Candidate	Votes	%	±%
Democratic	Joseph Hirkala (incumbent)	28,325	58.3%	▲2.9
Republican	Joseph F. Job	20,222	41.7%	▼0.3
Total votes		48,547	100.00%	

== District 37 ==
=== General election ===
==== Candidates ====
- Matthew Feldman, incumbent Senator since 1974 and former Senate President (Note: Feldman previously served in the Senate from 1966 to 1968.) (Democratic)
- Michael L. Kingman (Republican)

==== Results ====
1983 general election
Party	Candidate	Votes	%	±%
Democratic	Matthew Feldman (incumbent)	32,645	64.3%	▲2.6
Republican	Michael L. Kingman	18,143	35.7%	▼2.6
Total votes		50,788	100.00%	

== District 38 ==
=== Democratic primary ===
==== Candidates ====
- Paul Contillo, former Assemblyman from Paramus
- John Skevin, former Senator from Hackensack

=== General election ===
==== Candidates ====
- Paul Contillo, former Assemblyman from Paramus (Democratic)
- John B. Paolella, incumbent Senator since 1982 (Republican)

==== Results ====
1983 general election
Party	Candidate	Votes	%	±%
Democratic	Paul Contillo	22,422	50.7%	▲4.2
Republican	John B. Paolella (incumbent)	21,827	49.3%	▼1.7
Total votes		44,249	100.00%	

== District 39 ==
=== General election ===
==== Candidates ====
- Gerald Cardinale, incumbent Senator since 1982 (Republican)
- Francis Herbert, former Senator from Waldwick (Democratic)

==== Results ====
1983 general election
Party	Candidate	Votes	%	±%
Republican	Gerald Cardinale (incumbent)	27,199	51.2%	▼7.0
Democratic	Francis Herbert	25,942	48.8%	▲7.0
Total votes		53,141	100.0	

== District 40 ==
=== General election ===
==== Candidates ====
- Garrett W. Hagedorn, incumbent Senator since 1968 (Republican)
- Charles F. Ryan (Democratic)

==== Results ====
1983 general election
Party	Candidate	Votes	%	±%
Republican	Garrett W. Hagedorn (incumbent)	28,755	65.5%	▼1.3
Democratic	Charles F. Ryan	15,152	34.5%	▲1.3
Total votes		43,907	100.00%	
