= Rose Marie Heck =

American politician (1932–2026)

Mayor of Hasbrouck Heights, New Jersey
- In office January 1, 2008 – December 31, 2015
- Preceded by: Ronald Jones
- Succeeded by: Jack DeLorenzo
- In office January 1, 1988 – December 31, 1995
- Preceded by: William Imken
- Succeeded by: William J. Torre

Member of the New Jersey General Assembly from the 38th district
- In office January 1, 1991 – January 13, 2004 Serving with Patrick J. Roma, Guy Talarico and Matt Ahearn
- Preceded by: Pat Schuber
- Succeeded by: Robert M. Gordon; Joan Voss

Personal details
- Born: August 4, 1932
- Died: March 7, 2026 (aged 93)
- Party: Republican

Rose Marie Heck (August 4, 1932 – March 7, 2026) was an American politician who served as the mayor of Hasbrouck Heights, New Jersey, from 1988 to 1995 and again from 2008 to 2015.

== Life and career ==
Heck served on the South West Community Development Committee from 1970 and was its chair from 1983 to 1990. She was the mayor of Hasbrouck Heights from 1988 to 1995, and served on the borough's Planning Board during that period. Heck served on the Hasbrouck Heights Council from 1985 to 1987 and on the Hasbrouck Heights Zoning Board from 1978 to 1984. She was a Commissioner on the Bergen County Utility Authority Commissioner from 1989 to 1991 and was chair of the County Community Development Committee from 1987 to 1990. On November 6, 2007, Heck was elected for her third term as Mayor of Hasbrouck Heights.

She served as a member of the New Jersey General Assembly for the 38th legislative district from 1991 to 2003. Heck's district covered an area between the Passaic and Hudson Rivers in suburban Bergen County. In the 2003 general election, Heck lost to Joseph Coniglio, the Democratic Party candidate for the office of State Senate for District 38.

Heck had been elected in 1991 to fill the assembly seat vacated by Pat Schuber who stepped down to serve as county executive of Bergen County.

In the Assembly, Heck served as majority conference leader from 2000 to 2001 and chair of the Policy and Regulatory Oversight Committee from 1996 to 1999.

In 1995, a bill that Heck had sponsored was signed into law by governor Christine Todd Whitman that guaranteed that insurers would be required to pay for 48 hours of hospital care for woman after routine deliveries and 96 hours following a Caesarean section, ending a practice called "drive-through deliveries" in which women would be pushed out of the hospital after 24 hours.

Heck died on March 7, 2026, at the age of 93.
