= Guy Talarico =

American politician (born 1955)

Member of the New Jersey General Assembly from the 38th district
- In office February 20, 1997 – January 8, 2002 Serving with Rose Marie Heck
- Preceded by: Patrick J. Roma
- Succeeded by: Matt Ahearn

Personal details
- Born: Guy Francis Talarico; August 28, 1955 (age 71)
- Party: Republican
- Education: Lehigh University (BS); Fairleigh Dickinson University (MBA); New York Law School (JD)

Guy F. Talarico (born August 28, 1955) is an American lawyer and Republican Party politician, who served two full terms in the New Jersey General Assembly, where he represented the 38th Legislative District.

== Biography ==
Talarico earned his undergraduate degree from Lehigh University with a major in Chemical Engineering, was awarded a Master of Business Administration degree from Fairleigh Dickinson University with a major in Management and received a J.D. from New York Law School in June 1986. He worked as a Vice President / Sales Executive at Chase Manhattan Corporation. He served as a member of the borough council in Oradell, New Jersey.

Talarico was chosen by Republican county committee members in February 1997 to fill the vacancy created when Patrick J. Roma stepped down from office to take a seat as a judge on the New Jersey Superior Court. He was elected to a full term in the Assembly in 1997 together with Rose Marie Heck of Hasbrouck Heights, and the two were re-elected in 1999. In redistricting following the 2000 census, Talarico was relocated to the 39th Legislative District and came in third in the 2001 Republican primary behind Charlotte Vandervalk and John E. Rooney. In the Assembly, Talarico served as Vice Chair of the Senior Issues and Community Services Committee and as a member of the Law and Public Safety Committee.

In August 1998, Talarico sponsored a bill that would require commitment for those with mental health issues if it is determined that it is likely that they will commit future crimes.

Talarico resigned as chairman of the Bergen County Republican Organization following the loss of Todd Caliguire in the Republican primary to Kevin J. O'Toole.

In January 2023, Talarico announced he was considering a state senate bid in the 38th Legislative District to challenge for seat held by Democratic incumbent Joseph Lagana.
