= Tim Eustace =

American politician (born 1956)

Member of the New Jersey General Assembly from the 38th district
- In office January 10, 2012 – April 13, 2018
- Preceded by: Joan Voss
- Succeeded by: Lisa Swain; Chris Tully

Mayor of Maywood, New Jersey
- In office January 1, 2008 – December 31, 2011
- Preceded by: Lorraine LaPietra
- Succeeded by: Gregg A. Padovano

Personal details
- Born: Timothy James Eustace; December 27, 1956 (age 69) Passaic, New Jersey
- Party: Democratic
- Spouse: Kevin J. Williams (m. 2013; died 2015)
- Children: 2
- Education: Ramapo College (B.S.)
- Website: Legislative homepage

Timothy James Eustace (born December 27, 1956) is an American chiropractor and Democratic Party politician from Maywood, New Jersey who served in the New Jersey General Assembly, representing the 38th Legislative District from 2012 to 2018.

== Early life ==
Born in Passaic, New Jersey, Eustace attended Blair Academy in Blairstown, New Jersey, graduating in 1974; he later recalled the challenges of taking public transportation from Blair Academy back to Bergen County. In 1978, he earned a Bachelor of Science degree in psychology from Ramapo College in Mahwah, New Jersey. Attending Pennsylvania College of Chiropractic, Eustace earned a doctorate in 1985 and became a licensed chiropractor. He has also served as president of Maywood's chamber of commerce and the local Rotary Club. Eustace is openly gay; he was together with his partner and later husband Kevin Williams, director of the Maywood Rotary Kenya Project, for 34 years and they raised two children together before Williams' death in June 2015.

Eustace and his husband were among the first gay couples to adopt children in New Jersey.

== Political career ==
A Democrat, he served four years as mayor of Maywood (2008–2012), three years as borough council president (2005–2008) and a decade on the borough council (1995–1997 and 2001–2008).

His election in 2011, following the redrawing of the legislative map, made him the first openly gay person elected to the New Jersey Legislature as a non-incumbent. He joined Assemblyman Reed Gusciora, who came out while in office and has subsequently won re-election, in the legislature. Eustace's assembly campaign won the support of the Gay & Lesbian Victory Fund.

Eustace sought re-election in 2013 and the district was a top target for both parties, which together spent $5.8 million on the campaign for the district's three seats, one of the highest spending amounts of any legislative race in state history. Eustace was narrowly re-elected after a recount confirmed that he had beaten Republican Joseph Scarpa by 35 votes in a contest that drew approximately 52,000 voters.

In the Assembly, Eustace serves on the Regulatory Oversight Committee (as Vice-Chair), the Health and Senior Services Committee, and the State and Local Government Committee.

Eustace has emerged as a vocal defender of the environment and public drinking water; in 2017 he received a 114% score from Clean Water Action's environmental scorecard, the highest in the state. In December 2017, he announced that he would introduce a bill to make clean water an inalienable right in the state for all citizens.

New Jersey General Assembly
Preceded by Joan Voss	Member of the New Jersey General Assembly for the 38th District; January 10, 2012 – April 13, 2018; With: Connie Wagner, Paul Contillo, Joseph Lagana	Succeeded by Lisa Swain; Chris Tully
Political offices
Preceded by Lorraine LaPietra	Mayor of Maywood, New Jersey; January 1, 2008 – December 31, 2011	Succeeded by Gregg A. Padovano
