= Edward H. Hynes =

American politician (born 1946)

Member of the New Jersey General Assembly from the 38th district
- In office January 8, 1974 – January 13, 1976 Serving with Paul Contillo
- Preceded by: District created
- Succeeded by: Robert Burns

Member of the New Jersey General Assembly from the 13-E district
- In office January 11, 1972 – January 8, 1974
- Preceded by: Austin Volk; Edward A. Connell
- Succeeded by: District eliminated

Personal details
- Born: May 9, 1946 (age 79) Teaneck, New Jersey, U.S.
- Party: Democratic
- Occupation: Attorney

Edward H. Hynes (born May 9, 1946) is an American Democratic Party politician who served two terms in the New Jersey General Assembly.

== Biography ==
Hynes was born in Teaneck, New Jersey, in 1946 and grew up in Maywood. He attended St. Peter's Preparatory School in Jersey City, the University of Paris, Saint Peter's College in Jersey City, and Institut d'etudes politiques de Paris. During the Vietnam War, Hynes served a 30-month stint as an Army intelligence officer achieving the rank of First Lieutenant. While in Vietnam, he sought the Democratic nomination for a seat in the General Assembly from District 13-E, a narrow district that snaked through east-central Bergen County. After leaving the military, he began studying law at Fordham Law School. Whilst a student there, he narrowly won the November 1971 Assembly election by 57 votes.

For the 1973 elections, redistricting in the state brought 40 legislative districts to the map, Hynes's home was placed in the new 38th district. One of the new boroughs in the district, Oradell, had an ordinance prohibiting political canvassing without registering by mail to the local police. Hynes challenged this ordinance on First Amendment grounds. After a series of varying rulings from state courts, his case was eventually heard by the Supreme Court of the United States (Hynes v. Mayor and Council of Oradell) where the court decided in a 7–1 vote that the ordinance was unconstitutional. In the election itself, Hynes was reelected alongside his Democratic running mate Paul Contillo who both defeated incumbent Republican Assemblyman Charles E. Reid and Ralph W. Chandless Jr.

In 1974, Hynes sought election to the U.S. House of Representatives from the 7th district. Hynes lost the Democratic primary to eventual general election winner Andrew Maguire. He did not seek a third term to the Assembly in 1975 and settled on pursuing a private law practice (after being admitted to the bar in 1974). In March 1978, Hynes was appointed by Governor Brendan Byrne to the New Jersey Board of Public Utilities. In 1994, Hynes was the Democratic nominee for Bergen County Executive but lost to incumbent Republican Pat Schuber. From 2003 to 2010, Hynes was the executive director of the Bergen County Improvement Authority however just after retiring, investigations revealed missing receipts for reimbursements by Hynes.
