= Paul Contillo =

American politician (1929–2024)

Paul J. Contillo

Member of the New Jersey Senate from the 38th district
- In office 1984–1992
- Preceded by: John B. Paolella
- Succeeded by: Louis F. Kosco

Member of the New Jersey General Assembly from the 38th district
- In office November 18, 2013 – January 14, 2014 Serving with Robert M. Gordon and Tim Eustace
- Preceded by: Connie Wagner
- Succeeded by: Joseph Lagana
- In office 1974–1980 Serving with Edward H. Hynes (1974–76) and Robert Burns (1976–80)
- Preceded by: New district
- Succeeded by: John B. Paolella; Louis F. Kosco

Member of the Paramus Borough Council
- In office 1971–1973

Personal details
- Born: July 8, 1929
- Died: February 6, 2024 (aged 94)
- Party: Democratic

Paul J. Contillo (July 8, 1929 – February 6, 2024) was an American Democratic Party politician who represented the Bergen County-based 38th Legislative District in the New Jersey State Legislature during three separate tenures.

== Career ==
Paul Contillo was born in Manhattan and raised in Marine Park, Brooklyn where he attended James Madison High School.

Contillo served as a Councilman in Paramus, New Jersey, from 1971 to 1973. He was elected to the New Jersey General Assembly in 1973, entering the race after the Democratic nominee, Paramus Councilman Alphonso DeFilippo dropped out of the race after the primary. Riding the Watergate Democratic landslide, Contillo and his running mate, incumbent Assemblyman Edward Hynes defeated Republican Assemblyman Charles Reid and attorney Ralph W. Chandless Jr. Contillo was the top votegetter and won by more than 8,000 votes.

He sought re-election to a second term in 1975, running with Hasbrouck Heights Councilman Robert Burns after Hynes chose not to run. He defeated former Meadowlands Chamber of Commerce President Richard Fritzky in the Democratic primary by just 797 votes. In the general election, Contillo beat Chandless and former Mayor of Hackensack and Bergen County Freeholder Frank A. Buono Jr. by less than 2,000 votes.

Contillo was viewed as especially vulnerable in 1977 after voting for Governor Brendan Byrne's unpopular state income tax. Fritzky challenged him again in the Democratic primary but lost by more than 1,600 votes. But as Byrne rebounded in his re-election campaign, so did Contillo and Burns. They defeated Paramus Councilman Louis Kosco and Lodi Mayor James Cuccio by more than 3,000 votes. He sought re-election to a fourth term in 1979, but lost by 374 votes to Kosco and his running mate, attorney John Paolella.

In 1983, Contillo ran for State Senator against Paolella, who had ousted two-term Democrat John Skevin two years earlier. In a competitive Democratic primary, Contillo beat Skevin by 849 votes, and unseated Paolella in the general election by 595 votes. He was re-elected to a second term in the Senate in 1987, defeating Assemblyman Kosco by 2,368 votes.

In the Senate, Contillo served as Assistant Majority Leader and drafted New Jersey's local government ethics laws. Contillo was a leading advocate for using state funds to remediate hazardous waste sites and to preserve land owned by the Hackensack Water Company from development. He played a key role in advancing legislation that mandated personal financial disclosures for members of local governing bodies, as well as planning and zoning boards. In 1974, during his first month as an assemblyman, he introduced a bill to prohibit dual-officeholding, which quickly garnered attention from his Democratic colleagues.

After supporting Governor Jim Florio's controversial tax increases, Contillo was defeated for a third term in the Senate in 1991. In a rematch with Kosco, he lost by a landslide 7,168 votes.

Contillo sought a comeback in 1993, but lost the Democratic Senate primary to Garfield Councilman James Krone by 851 votes.

In 2013, at age 84 and after 22 years out of office, Contillo was again elected to the State Assembly. The incumbent, Connie Wagner, dropped her re-election bid in June and resigned her seat on October 1 to move to Florida. Democrats replaced Wagner on the ballot with Joseph Lagana, but in a Special Election Convention held on October 20, elected Contillo to fill the remaining three months of Wagner's term. He took office on November 18, 2013, and served until January 14, 2014. He was assigned to the Assembly Environment and Solid Waste Committee, and the Assembly Higher Education Committee.

Before retiring, he was the President and Founder of a New York City printing company, Allied Reproductions, Inc. Contillo died on February 6, 2024, at the age of 94.
