= Paolella =

Paolella is a surname. Notable people with the surname include:

- Domenico Paolella (1915–2002), Italian director, screenwriter, and journalist
- John B. Paolella (born 1949), American politician
