= Robert Burns (New Jersey politician) =

American politician (1926–2016)

Robert J. Burns

Member of the New Jersey General Assembly from the 38th district
- In office January 13, 1976 – January 8, 1980
- Preceded by: Edward H. Hynes
- Succeeded by: John B. Paolella; Louis F. Kosco

Personal details
- Born: March 17, 1926 Jersey City, New Jersey
- Died: March 14, 2016 (aged 89)
- Party: Democratic
- Spouse: Eleanor Solinski
- Children: 4
- Education: Seton Hall University
- Occupation: Sales manager

Robert J. Burns (March 17, 1926 – March 14, 2016) was an American Democratic Party politician who served two terms in the New Jersey General Assembly from the 38th Legislative District.

== Biography ==
Burns was born on March 17, 1926, in Jersey City to Helen and John Henry Burns. First attending St. Patrick's School, he later attended Lincoln High School and Henry Snyder High School. During World War II, he served in the United States Army with the 504th Parachute Infantry Regiment and the 82nd Airborne Division. He graduated from Seton Hall University, receiving a B.S. in 1955. He also attended Seton Hall Law School for one year. During the 1960s and '70s, he was a sales representative for the Tube Sales Company in Cranbury; however, later in life, he was a sales manager at the David Smith Steel Company in South Plainfield and for Industrial Waste Technologies in Oakland.

He was a Bergen County Democratic Committee person for eight years and served as the Democratic municipal chairman for Hasbrouck Heights for one year. He was elected to the Hasbrouck Heights council in 1971, the first Democrat ever elected there. He served on the council until January 1976 when he took his seat in the Assembly. Following the retirement of incumbent Democratic Assemblyman Edward H. Hynes in 1975, Burns and the other incumbent Democrat Paul Contillo were chosen in the June primary and narrowly won in the November general election. The two were reelected in 1977 by a slightly larger margin but were both defeated in 1979 by Republicans John B. Paolella and Louis F. Kosco. Burns would make three more attempts at the Assembly: in 1981 where he lost in the general election, in 1983 where he won the Democratic primary but dropped out of the general election due to job commitments, and in 1993 where he lost the general election.

Burns was married to the former Eleanor Solinski and had four children. He died on March 14, 2016, three days before his 90th birthday.
