= New Jersey's 38th legislative district =

American legislative district

- Senator: Joseph Lagana (D)
- Assembly members: Lisa Swain (D); Chris Tully (D)
- Registration: 35.8% Democratic; 23.0% Republican; 40.2% unaffiliated
- Demographics: 59.4% White; 4.3% Black/African American; 0.3% Native American; 15.9% Asian; 0.0% Hawaiian/Pacific Islander; 9.7% Other race; 10.5% Two or more races; 21.4% Hispanic
- Population: 227,451
- Voting-age population: 179,126
- Registered voters: 158,756

New Jersey's 38th legislative district is one of 40 districts that make up the map for the New Jersey Legislature. It covers the Bergen County municipalities of Bergenfield, Fair Lawn, Glen Rock, Hasbrouck Heights, Little Ferry, Lodi, Maywood, Moonachie, New Milford, Oradell, Paramus, River Edge, Rochelle Park, Saddle Brook, South Hackensack, and Teterboro.

== Demographic information ==
As of the 2020 United States census, the district had a population of 227,451, of whom 179,126 (78.8%) were of voting age. The racial makeup of the district was 135,144 (59.4%) White, 9,698 (4.3%) African American, 640 (0.3%) Native American, 36,122 (15.9%) Asian, 35 (0.0%) Pacific Islander, 21,955 (9.7%) from some other race, and 23,857 (10.5%) from two or more races. Hispanic or Latino of any race were 48,582 (21.4%) of the population.

The district had 164,670 registered voters as of February 1, 2025, of whom 66,211 (40.2%) were registered as unaffiliated, 58,905 (35.8%) were registered as Democrats, 37,911 (23.0%) were registered as Republicans, and 1,643 (1.0%) were registered to other parties.

== Political representation ==
For the 2026–2027 session, the 38th legislative district of the New Jersey Legislature is represented in the State Senate by Joseph Lagana (D, Paramus) and in the General Assembly by Lisa Swain (D, Fair Lawn) and Chris Tully (D, Bergenfield).

The legislative district overlaps with New Jersey's 5th and 9th congressional districts.

== Apportionment history ==
Since the creation of the 40-district legislative map in 1973, the 38th district has always included Paramus, though early in the lifetime of the 40-district map, Hackensack was also within the district. In the 1973 version of the map, and in the decade following the 1981 redistricting, Paramus and Hackensack anchored the 38th district with numerous nearby municipalities in central Bergen County compromising the remainder of the district. In the 1991 redistricting, the 38th became more of a crescent shape stretching from Cliffside Park and Palisades Park, northwest to Elmwood Park, then north and east to Paramus and Oradell. This shape was slightly modified in 2001 when that year's redistricting extended the 38th to the Hudson River picking up Fort Lee and Edgewater. The crescent shape of the district was removed in the 2011 redistricting when it changed to a T-shaped district extending out of Bergen County for the first time.

In October 2015, Anthony Cappola left the race for an Assembly seat in the 38th district and resigned from office as a member of the River Edge Borough Council, following disclosures that he had written and published a 2003 book titled Outrageous that was described as "full of racial slurs, rants and stereotypes". The Bergen County Republican Organization filed suit in Passaic County, seeking to replace Cappola's spot on the ballot with Fernando Alonso and offering to cover the $100,000 cost of reprinting ballots. Bergen County Clerk John Hogan argued that absentee ballots had already been printed and distributed, with nearly ballots already completed and submitted to the Clerk's Office. The Republicans unexpectedly dropped the effort to have the candidate replaced on October 13 and Cappola later announced his intention to continue in the race. Ultimately Cappola and his running mate Mark DiPisa were defeated by Democratic incumbents Tim Eustace and Joseph Lagana.

All three seats became vacant in 2018. Robert M. Gordon resigned his Senate seat on April 4, 2018, to accept an appointment to the New Jersey Board of Public Utilities. Democratic committee members in Bergen and Passaic Counties unanimously selected Assemblyman Lagana over Assemblyman Eustace (after the latter withdrew to back Lagana) to replace Gordon in the Senate on April 11; he took his Senate seat on April 12. The following day on April 13, Eustace resigned his seat to become deputy director of the North Jersey District Water Supply Commission. Committee members selected Fair Lawn Mayor Lisa Swain and Congressional aide and former Bergenfield Council President Chris Tully as the replacements in the Assembly; they were sworn in on May 24. In the November 6, 2018, special election to complete the unexpired terms, Lagana defeated Daisy Ortiz Berger for the senate seat and Swain and Tully defeated Republicans Gail Horton and Jayme Ouellete for the two assembly seats.

== Election history ==
Session	Senate	General Assembly	
1974–1975	John Skevin (D)	Edward H. Hynes (D)	Paul Contillo (D)
1976–1977	John Skevin (D)	Robert Burns (D)	Paul Contillo (D)
1978–1979	John Skevin (D)	Robert Burns (D)	Paul Contillo (D)
1980–1981	John Skevin (D)	John B. Paolella (R)	Louis F. Kosco (R)
1982–1983	John B. Paolella (R)	Pat Schuber (R)	Louis F. Kosco (R)
1984–1985	Paul Contillo (D)	Pat Schuber (R)	Louis F. Kosco (R)
1986–1987	Paul Contillo (D)	Pat Schuber (R)	Louis F. Kosco (R)
1988–1989	Paul Contillo (D)	Pat Schuber (R)	Patrick J. Roma (R)
1990–1991	Paul Contillo (D)	Pat Schuber (R) (Note: Resigned on December 31, 1990 following his election as Bergen County Executive)	Patrick J. Roma (R)
1990–1991	Paul Contillo (D)	Rose Marie Heck (R) (Note: Appointed to the Assembly; Sworn in on January 31, 1991)	Patrick J. Roma (R)
1992–1993	Louis F. Kosco (R)	Rose Marie Heck (R)	Patrick J. Roma (R)
1994–1995	Louis F. Kosco (R)	Rose Marie Heck (R)	Patrick J. Roma (R)
1996–1997	Louis F. Kosco (R)	Rose Marie Heck (R)	Patrick J. Roma (R) (Note: Resigned January 10, 1997 to become a Superior Court judge)
1996–1997	Louis F. Kosco (R)	Rose Marie Heck (R)	Guy Talarico (R) (Note: Appointed to the Assembly on February 20, 1997)
1998–1999	Louis F. Kosco (R)	Rose Marie Heck (R)	Guy Talarico (R)
2000–2001	Louis F. Kosco (R)	Rose Marie Heck (R)	Guy Talarico (R)
2002–2003	Joseph Coniglio (D)	Rose Marie Heck (R)	Matt Ahearn (D)
2002–2003	Joseph Coniglio (D)	Rose Marie Heck (R)	Matt Ahearn (G) (Note: Switched party registration on January 24, 2003)
2004–2005	Joseph Coniglio (D)	Robert M. Gordon (D)	Joan Voss (D)
2006–2007	Joseph Coniglio (D)	Robert M. Gordon (D)	Joan Voss (D)
2008–2009	Robert M. Gordon (D)	Connie Wagner (D)	Joan Voss (D)
2010–2011	Robert M. Gordon (D)	Connie Wagner (D)	Joan Voss (D)
2012–2013	Robert M. Gordon (D)	Connie Wagner (D) (Note: Resigned on October 1, 2013)	Tim Eustace (D)
2012–2013	Robert M. Gordon (D)	Paul Contillo (D) (Note: Appointed to the Assembly on November 18, 2013)	Tim Eustace (D)
2014–2015	Robert M. Gordon (D)	Joseph Lagana (D)	Tim Eustace (D)
2016–2017	Robert M. Gordon (D)	Joseph Lagana (D)	Tim Eustace (D)
2018–2019	Robert M. Gordon (D) (Note: Resigned on April 4, 2018 to become a Commissioner of the Board of Public Utilities)	Joseph Lagana (D) (Note: Appointed to the Senate on April 12, 2018, won a November 6, 2018 special election to complete unexpired term)	Tim Eustace (D) (Note: Resigned on April 13, 2018 to become Deputy Director of the North Jersey District Water Supply Commission)
2018–2019	Joseph Lagana (D)	Lisa Swain (D) (Note: Appointed to the Assembly on May 24, 2018, won a November 6, 2018 special election to complete unexpired term)	Chris Tully (D)
2020–2021	Joseph Lagana (D)	Lisa Swain (D)	Chris Tully (D)
2022–2023	Joseph Lagana (D)	Lisa Swain (D)	Chris Tully (D)
2024–2025	Joseph Lagana (D)	Lisa Swain (D)	Chris Tully (D)
2026–2027	Joseph Lagana (D)	Lisa Swain (D)	Chris Tully (D)

== Election results ==
=== Senate ===
2021 New Jersey general election
Party	Candidate	Votes	%	±%
Democratic	Joseph A. Lagana	34,895	52.9	▼7.2
Republican	Richard Garcia	31,069	47.1	▲7.2
Total votes		65,964	100.0	

Special election, November 6, 2018
Party	Candidate	Votes	%	±%
Democratic	Joseph A. Lagana	48,451	60.1	▲3.0
Republican	Daisy Ortiz Berger	32,140	39.9	▼3.0
Total votes		80,591	100.0	

New Jersey general election, 2017
Party	Candidate	Votes	%	±%
Democratic	Bob Gordon	30,881	57.1	▲5.2
Republican	Kelly Langschultz	23,238	42.9	▼5.2
Total votes		54,119	100.0	

New Jersey general election, 2013
Party	Candidate	Votes	%	±%
Democratic	Bob Gordon	27,779	51.9	▼1.1
Republican	Fernando A. Alonso	25,767	48.1	▲1.1
Total votes		53,546	100.0	

2011 New Jersey general election
Party	Candidate	Votes	%
Democratic	Robert M. Gordon	22,299	53.0
Republican	John J. Driscoll, Jr.	19,745	47.0
Total votes		42,044	100.0

2007 New Jersey general election
Party	Candidate	Votes	%	±%
Democratic	Robert M. Gordon	22,351	59.9	▲4.2
Republican	Robert Colletti	14,949	40.1	▼4.2
Total votes		37,300	100.0	

2003 New Jersey general election
Party	Candidate	Votes	%	±%
Democratic	Joseph Coniglio	23,077	55.7	▲2.5
Republican	Rose Marie Heck	18,321	44.3	▼2.5
Total votes		41,398	100.0	

2001 New Jersey general election
Party	Candidate	Votes	%
Democratic	Joseph Coniglio	29,316	53.2
Republican	Louis F. Kosco	25,773	46.8
Total votes		55,089	100.0

1997 New Jersey general election
Party	Candidate	Votes	%	±%
Republican	Louis F. Kosco	30,538	55.2	▼8.1
Democratic	Valerie Vaineri Huttle	23,350	42.2	▲5.5
Conservative	Denise A. Richardson	1,390	2.5	N/A
Total votes		55,278	100.0	

1993 New Jersey general election
Party	Candidate	Votes	%	±%
Republican	Louis F. Kosco	40,276	63.3	▲7.9
Democratic	James Krone	23,348	36.7	▼4.4
Total votes		63,624	100.0	

1991 New Jersey general election
Party	Candidate	Votes	%
Republican	Louis F. Kosco	27,748	55.4
Democratic	Paul Contillo	20,572	41.1
Taxpayers Only Choice	C. Fischer	1,773	3.5
Total votes		50,093	100.0

1987 New Jersey general election
Party	Candidate	Votes	%	±%
Democratic	Paul Contillo	23,574	52.6	▲1.9
Republican	Louis F. Kosco	21,206	47.4	▼1.9
Total votes		44,780	100.0	

1983 New Jersey general election
Party	Candidate	Votes	%	±%
Democratic	Paul Contillo	22,422	50.7	▲4.2
Republican	John B. Paolella	21,827	49.3	▼1.7
Total votes		44,249	100.0	

1981 New Jersey general election
Party	Candidate	Votes	%
Republican	John B. Paolella	30,670	51.0
Democratic	John M. Skevin	27,968	46.5
Citizens For Progress	Bernard J. Focarino	1,473	2.5
Total votes		60,111	100.0

1977 New Jersey general election
Party	Candidate	Votes	%	±%
Democratic	John M. Skevin	24,629	56.1	▼1.5
Republican	Frank A. Buono, Jr.	19,289	43.9	▲1.5
Total votes		43,918	100.0	

1973 New Jersey general election
Party	Candidate	Votes	%
Democratic	John M. Skevin	31,677	57.6
Republican	Frederick E. Wendel	23,307	42.4
Total votes		54,984	100.0

=== General Assembly ===
2021 New Jersey general election
Party	Candidate	Votes	%	±%
Democratic	Lisa Swain	34,226	26.5	▼1.2
Democratic	Chris Tully	33,444	25.9	▼1.3
Republican	Alfonso Mastrofilipo Jr.	30,777	23.9	▲1.2
Republican	Gerard "Jerry" Taylor	30,597	23.7	▲1.3
Total votes		129,044	100.0	

2019 New Jersey general election
Party	Candidate	Votes	%	±%
Democratic	Lisa Swain	23,173	27.7	▼1.6
Democratic	Christopher Tully	22,727	27.2	▼2.0
Republican	Christopher DiPiazza	18,929	22.7	▲2.2
Republican	Michael A. Kazimir	18,725	22.4	▲1.9
Total votes		83,554	100.0	

Special election, November 6, 2018
Party	Candidate	Votes	%
Democratic	Christopher Tully	46,406	59.3
Republican	Jayme Ouellette	31,833	40.7
Total votes		78,239	100.0

Special election, November 6, 2018
Party	Candidate	Votes	%
Democratic	Lisa Swain	47,865	59.7
Republican	Gail Horton	32,310	40.3
Total votes		80,175	100.0

New Jersey general election, 2017
Party	Candidate	Votes	%	±%
Democratic	Joseph A. Lagana	30,800	29.3	▲0.2
Democratic	Tim Eustace	30,727	29.2	▲0.1
Republican	William Leonard	21,541	20.5	▼1.4
Republican	Christopher B. Wolf	21,525	20.5	▲0.6
Independent- NJ Awakens	Dev Goswami	533	0.5	N/A
Total votes		105,126	100.0	

New Jersey general election, 2015
Party	Candidate	Votes	%	±%
Democratic	Tim Eustace	19,563	29.1	▲4.1
Democratic	Joseph Lagana	19,511	29.1	▲3.9
Republican	Mark DiPisa	14,721	21.9	▼3.0
Republican	Anthony Cappola	13,339	19.9	▼4.9
Total votes		67,134	100.0	

New Jersey general election, 2013
Party	Candidate	Votes	%	±%
Democratic	Joseph Lagana	26,279	25.2	▼2.0
Democratic	Timothy J. Eustace	26,021	25.00	▼0.7
Republican	Joseph J. Scarpa	25,965	24.94	▲1.6
Republican	Joan Fragala	25,836	24.81	▲1.8
Total votes		104,101	100.0	

New Jersey general election, 2011
Party	Candidate	Votes	%
Democratic	Connie Terranova Wagner	22,258	27.2
Democratic	Timothy J. Eustace	21,097	25.7
Republican	Richard S. Goldberg	19,091	23.3
Republican	Fernando A. Alonso	18,820	23.0
Libertarian	Vinko Grskovic	707	0.9
Total votes		81,973	100.0

New Jersey general election, 2009
Party	Candidate	Votes	%	±%
Democratic	Concetta Wagner	28,618	27.9	▼1.7
Democratic	Joan M. Voss	28,078	27.4	▼2.6
Republican	Judith Fisher	23,132	22.5	▲1.8
Republican	Nicholas Lonzisero	22,808	22.2	▲2.5
Total votes		102,636	100.0	

New Jersey general election, 2007
Party	Candidate	Votes	%	±%
Democratic	Joan M. Voss	21,779	30.0	0.0
Democratic	Concetta Wagner	21,457	29.6	▼0.9
Republican	John J. Driscoll Jr.	14,997	20.7	▲0.9
Republican	Renee Czarnecki	14,323	19.7	0.0
Total votes		72,556	100.0	

New Jersey general election, 2005
Party	Candidate	Votes	%	±%
Democratic	Robert M. Gordon	32,389	30.5	▲3.6
Democratic	Joan M. Voss	31,886	30.0	▲4.6
Republican	Richard L. Miller	21,008	19.8	▼1.6
Republican	John J. Baldino	20,915	19.7	▼1.2
Total votes		106,198	100.0	

New Jersey general election, 2003
Party	Candidate	Votes	%	±%
Democratic	Robert M. Gordon	21,857	26.9	▲1.7
Democratic	Joan Voss	20,580	25.4	▲0.5
Republican	Louis A. Tedesco Jr	17,398	21.4	▼3.9
Republican	Ed Trawinski	16,983	20.9	▼3.7
Green	Matt Ahearn	4,357	5.4	▼19.8
Total votes		81,175	100.0	

New Jersey general election, 2001
Party	Candidate	Votes	%
Republican	Rose Marie Heck	27,055	25.3
Democratic	Matt Ahearn	26,919	25.2
Democratic	Kay Nest	26,587	24.9
Republican	Nicholas R. Felice	26,252	24.6
Total votes		106,813	100.0

New Jersey general election, 1999
Party	Candidate	Votes	%	±%
Republican	Rose Marie Heck	17,734	27.5	▼0.5
Republican	Guy F. Talarico	17,620	27.3	▲1.0
Democratic	Helene Herbert	14,307	22.2	▼0.2
Democratic	Robert Riccardella	13,972	21.7	▼0.5
Independent - Progressive	Michael Perrone, Jr.	899	1.4	N/A
Total votes		64,532	100.0	

New Jersey general election, 1997
Party	Candidate	Votes	%	±%
Republican	Rose Marie Heck	29,987	28.0	▲1.6
Republican	Guy F. Talarico	28,157	26.3	▼1.9
Democratic	Michael Paul De Marse	23,956	22.4	▲1.1
Democratic	Fred Dressel	23,738	22.2	▲1.6
Conservative	Bernard C. Sobolewski	1,259	1.2	▼0.5
Total votes		107,097	100.0	

New Jersey general election, 1995
Party	Candidate	Votes	%	±%
Republican	Patrick J. Roma	21,013	28.2	▼4.0
Republican	Rose Marie Heck	19,655	26.4	▼4.1
Democratic	Donna M. Spoto	15,832	21.3	▲2.8
Democratic	Frederick J. Dressel	15,314	20.6	▲2.1
Conservative	Bernadette Mc Caskey	1,326	1.8	N/A
Conservative	Bernard C. Sobolewski	1,245	1.7	N/A
Total votes		74,385	100.0	

New Jersey general election, 1993
Party	Candidate	Votes	%	±%
Republican	Patrick J. Roma	40,523	32.2	▲0.2
Republican	Rose Marie Heck	38,388	30.5	▲1.9
Democratic	Frank Biasco	23,665	18.8	▼1.1
Democratic	Robert Burns	23,292	18.5	▼1.0
Total votes		125,868	100.0	

1991 New Jersey general election
Party	Candidate	Votes	%
Republican	Patrick J. Roma	31,958	32.0
Republican	Rose Marie Heck	28,552	28.6
Democratic	Frank Biasco	19,816	19.9
Democratic	Thomas J. Duch	19,398	19.5
Total votes		99,724	100.0

1989 New Jersey general election
Party	Candidate	Votes	%	±%
Republican	William P. Schuber	29,652	27.5	▲0.4
Republican	Patrick J. Roma	28,264	26.3	▲1.2
Democratic	Joseph Cipolla	24,983	23.2	▼0.9
Democratic	Greta Kiernan	24,739	23.0	▼0.7
Total votes		107,638	100.0	

1987 New Jersey general election
Party	Candidate	Votes	%	±%
Republican	William P. Schuber	23,566	27.1	▼3.7
Republican	Patrick J. Roma	21,791	25.1	▼5.1
Democratic	John J. Ryan, Jr.	20,894	24.1	▲4.3
Democratic	Joseph Capizzi	20,576	23.7	▲4.8
Total votes		86,827	100.0	

1985 New Jersey general election
Party	Candidate	Votes	%	±%
Republican	William P. Schuber	29,606	30.8	▲3.9
Republican	Louis F. Kosco	29,096	30.2	▲3.1
Democratic	Thomas K. Hynes	19,033	19.8	▼3.9
Democratic	David S. Turetsky	18,190	18.9	▼3.5
Libertarian	Richard Kraus	313	0.3	N/A
Total votes		96,238	100.0	

New Jersey general election, 1983
Party	Candidate	Votes	%	±%
Republican	Louis F. Kosco	23,191	27.1	▲1.0
Republican	William P. Schuber	23,034	26.9	▲2.1
Democratic	Robert J. Colon	20,303	23.7	▼0.2
Democratic	Adeline Epifano Goldsholl	19,201	22.4	▼1.0
Total votes		85,729	100.0	

New Jersey general election, 1981
Party	Candidate	Votes	%
Republican	Louis F. Kosco	30,204	26.1
Republican	William P. Schuber	28,684	24.8
Democratic	Tony Luna	27,624	23.9
Democratic	Robert Burns	27,012	23.4
Citizens For Progress	Andrew J. Repetti	1,161	1.0
Citizens For Progress	Charles Lo Presti	942	0.8
Total votes		115,627	100.0

New Jersey general election, 1979
Party	Candidate	Votes	%	±%
Republican	John B. Paolella	20,452	26.1	▲2.3
Republican	Louis F. Kosco	19,578	25.0	▲2.9
Democratic	Paul J. Contillo	19,204	24.5	▼2.8
Democratic	Robert Burns	18,294	23.3	▼3.5
Independents	Walter Haas	881	1.1	N/A
Total votes		78,409	100.0	

New Jersey general election, 1977
Party	Candidate	Votes	%	±%
Democratic	Paul J. Contillo	23,585	27.3	▲1.1
Democratic	Robert Burns	23,113	26.8	▲1.7
Republican	James J. Cuccio	20,551	23.8	▼0.6
Republican	Louis F. Kosco	19,028	22.1	▼2.2
Total votes		86,277	100.0	

New Jersey general election, 1975
Party	Candidate	Votes	%	±%
Democratic	Paul J. Contillo	25,621	26.2	▼2.9
Democratic	Robert Burns	24,511	25.1	▼4.9
Republican	Frank A. Buono, Jr.	23,873	24.4	▲3.1
Republican	Ralph W. Chandless, Jr.	23,800	24.3	▲4.6
Total votes		97,805	100.0	

New Jersey general election, 1973
Party	Candidate	Votes	%
Democratic	Edward H. Hynes	32,878	30.0
Democratic	Paul J. Contillo	31,818	29.1
Republican	Charles E. Reid	23,276	21.3
Republican	Ralph W. Chandless, Jr.	21,544	19.7
Total votes		109,516	100.0
