= Louis F. Kosco =

American politician (born 1932)

Member of the New Jersey Senate from the 38th district
- In office January 14, 1992 – January 8, 2002
- Preceded by: Paul J. Contillo
- Succeeded by: Joseph Coniglio

Member of the New Jersey General Assembly from the 38th district
- In office January 8, 1980 – January 3, 1988 Serving with John B. Paolella and Pat Schuber
- Preceded by: Robert Burns; Paul Contillo
- Succeeded by: Patrick J. Roma

Personal details
- Born: June 5, 1932 (age 94) Hackensack, New Jersey, U.S.
- Party: Republican
- Spouse: Elaine
- Children: 3

Military service
- Branch/service: United States Army
- Rank: Sergeant

Louis F. Kosco (born June 5, 1932) is an American Republican Party politician who served in both the New Jersey General Assembly and the New Jersey Senate.

== Biography ==
Born in Hackensack, Kosco grew up in Ridgefield Park, where he attended Lincoln Elementary School and graduated from Ridgefield Park High School in 1950. He later attended Lincoln Technical Institute and the New York Institute of Auto Mechanics.

Kosco lived in Paramus, where he served on the Borough Council from 1969 to 1979, was Police and Fire Commissioner in 1974, Public Works Commissioner in 1972 and 1973 and was the Borough Council President in 1977 and 1978. He served in the United States Army during the Korean War, reaching the rank of sergeant.

In the 1980 elections for the General Assembly, Kosco and running mate John B. Paolella defeated incumbents Robert Burns and Paul J. Contillo. He served in the General Assembly from 1980 to 1987, serving as Assistant Minority Whip in 1984 and 1985.

In 1987, Kosco ran for Senate, losing to incumbent Paul J. Contillo by a 53%-47% margin. In a 1991 rematch, Kosco unseated the three-term incumbent Contillo, taking 57% of the vote. Kosco began his service in the New Jersey Senate in 1992, where he served as Chair of the Law and Public Safety Committee and as a member of the Judiciary Committee. Kosco was re-elected to the Senate in 1993 over Democrat James Krone and again in 1997 by a 55%-42% margin against Democrat Valerie Vainieri Huttle.

In 1993, Kosco and Senator John P. Scott co-sponsored legislation to impose a commuter tax on New York residents who worked in the Garden State based on their total family income, which Kosco described as "retaliatory legislation" on behalf of the 230,000 New Jersey residents who worked in New York and were assessed taxes by that state on their income.

In redistricting following the 2000 Census, two heavily Democratic-leaning municipalities — Fair Lawn and Fort Lee — were added to the 38th Legislative District. These two communities voted heavily for Democrat Joseph Coniglio in the November 2001 elections, who unseated Kosco by a 53%-47% margin.
