= Patrick J. Roma =

American politician (1949-2017)

Member of the New Jersey General Assembly from the 38th district
- In office January 12, 1988 – January 10, 1997 Serving with Pat Schuber and Rose Marie Heck
- Preceded by: Louis F. Kosco
- Succeeded by: Guy Talarico

Personal details
- Born: July 20, 1949 New York City, New York, U.S.
- Died: November 26, 2017 (aged 68) Naples, Florida, U.S.
- Party: Republican
- Education: Seton Hall University; Samford University; New York University School of Law
- Occupation: Lawyer

Patrick Joseph Roma (July 20, 1949 – November 26, 2017) was an American lawyer and Republican Party politician who represented the 38th Legislative District in the New Jersey General Assembly from 1988 to 1997, leaving office to serve as a judge in New Jersey Superior Court until his retirement from the bench in 2014.

Born in New York City and raised in Cliffside Park, New Jersey Roma graduated from Cliffside Park High School. After receiving his undergraduate degree from Seton Hall University, he graduated from Samford University with a Juris Doctor degree and earned a second law degree from New York University School of Law.

== Political career ==
A practicing attorney, Roma was elected to serve on the Borough Council in Palisades Park, serving as council president.

First elected to the Assembly in 1987 with fellow Republican Pat Schuber, Roma and Schuber were re-elected in 1989 before Schuber resigned to take office as the Bergen County Executive and was replaced by Rose Marie Heck. Roma and Heck were re-elected in 1991, 1993 and 1995. Guy Talarico was chosen by Republican county committee members in February 1997 to fill the vacancy created when Roma stepped down from office on January 10, 1997, to take a seat as a judge on the New Jersey Superior Court. He was granted tenure as a judge in 2003 and served until 2014 when he retired.

When a New Jersey law banning assault weapons went into effect in June 1991, Roma was the first person in Bergen County to have turned in a weapon as inoperable.

In 1992, Roma ran against five-term Democratic incumbent Robert Torricelli in New Jersey's 9th congressional district, criticizing his opponent as "the poster child for Congressional abuse" which included bouncing 27 checks drawn on the House Bank for more than $11,000 in just over three years and sending $250,000 in mailings at taxpayer expense using his franking privileges.

== Death ==
A resident of Naples, Florida, Roma died of a stroke on November 26, 2017.
