= Matt Ahearn =

American politician

Matthew Ahearn

Member of the New Jersey General Assembly from the 38th district
- In office January 8, 2002 – January 13, 2004 Serving with Rose Marie Heck
- Preceded by: Guy Talarico
- Succeeded by: Robert M. Gordon; Joan Voss

Personal details
- Party: Green (since 2003)
- Other political affiliations: Democratic (prior to 2003)
- Education: Rutgers University (BA); Hofstra University (JD)
- Occupation: Attorney

Matthew Ahearn is an American politician who served in the New Jersey General Assembly, representing the 38th legislative district from 2002 to 2004. Ahearn represented a district which covers an area between the Passaic and Hudson Rivers in suburban Bergen County. Ahearn was elected to the Assembly as a Democrat in 2002, but switched his registration to the Green Party in January 2003, while in office after a much-publicized feud with Bergen County Democratic Organization chief Joe Ferriero. Ahearn ran as the Green Party candidate in 2003 and lost to Robert M. Gordon and Joan Voss, the Democratic candidates for office.

== Education ==
Ahearn graduated with a B.A. from Rutgers University in Political Science and a J.D. from the Hofstra University School of Law.

== Career ==
Ahearn served in the Assembly on the Military & Veterans' Affairs Committee (as Vice Chair) and the Regulated Professions & Independent Authorities Committee.

Ahearn served as the Deputy Mayor of Fair Lawn from 1998–2000 and on the Fair Lawn Planning Board during that same period.

He served in the United States Army from 1981–1985, and in the United States Army Reserves/National Guard from 1985–1992, attaining the rank of captain.
