= Joan Voss =

American politician (born 1940)

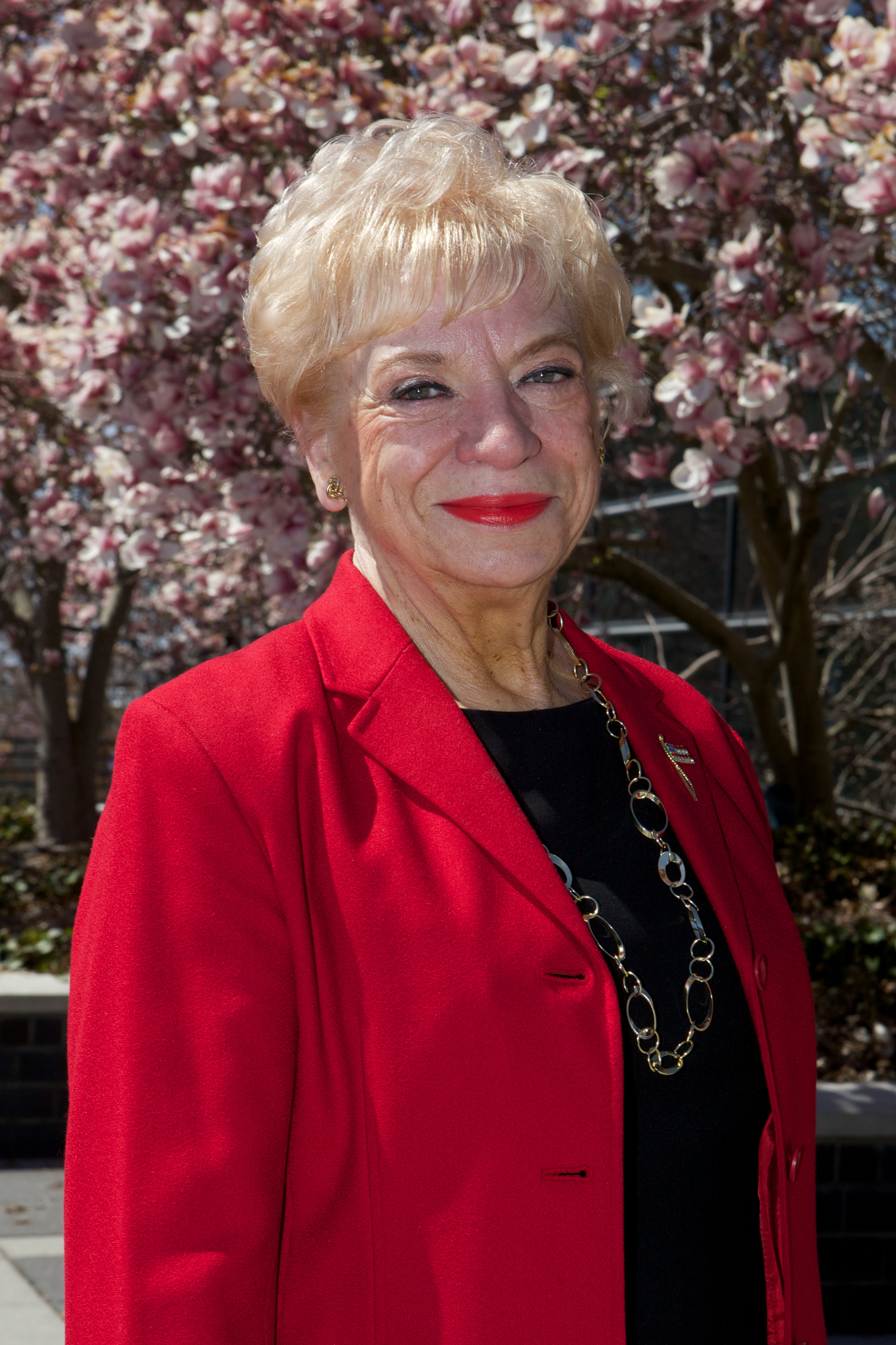

Member of the Bergen County Board of County Commissioners
- Incumbent
- Assumed office January 2012

Member of the New Jersey General Assembly from the 38th district
- In office January 13, 2004 – January 5, 2012 Serving with Robert M. Gordon, Connie Wagner
- Preceded by: Matt Ahearn; Rose Marie Heck
- Succeeded by: Tim Eustace

Personal details
- Born: Joan M. Voss; August 21, 1940 (age 86) New York City, New York, U.S.
- Party: Democratic
- Children: Theodore
- Education: Montclair State University, B.A., M.A. Fordham University, Ed.D.
- Website: Bergen County Freeholders

Joan M. Voss (born August 21, 1940) is an American Democratic Party politician who served in the New Jersey General Assembly from 2004 until 2012, representing the 38th Legislative District. Voss was elected to the Bergen County Board of County Commissioners in 2011 after choosing not to seek reelection to her Assembly seat.

== Biography ==
Born in New York City, Voss was raised in Fort Lee, New Jersey and attended the local public schools. Voss graduated with a B.A. in 1962 from Montclair State University (History and English), an M.A. in 1971 from Montclair State University (Education), and received an Ed.D. from Fordham University (Education).

Voss taught at Fort Lee High School beginning in 1963. She served as Departmental Assistant of the Social Studies and English Departments from 2000 to 2003. She had previously functioned briefly as the Departmental Assistant of the combined Science, Math and Guidance Departments in 1992. In 1983, she developed a humanities program to help prepare students for college in the areas of philosophy, ancient history, the classics, ethics, and European and Asian history and culture. The Humanities Course was offered for credit at several colleges and universities. She has been an adjunct professor at Seton Hall University, Saint Peter's College, and Edward Williams College of Fairleigh Dickinson University.

She served on the Fort Lee Borough Council from 1993 to 2004. Voss is a member of the Fort Lee Municipal Alliance Committee, which coordinates community and school activities and served on the Borough's Board of Ethics.

In the 2003 election for the General Assembly, Voss and running mate Robert M. Gordon unseated the incumbents, Green Party candidate Matt Ahearn and Republican Rose Marie Heck. (Heck did not run for reelection, instead choosing to run for the district's State Senate seat that year and losing to Joseph Coniglio, while Ahearn had changed his party affiliation from Democratic to Green while serving).

Voss served in the Assembly on the Education Committee (as Vice Chair), Higher Education Committee, the Regulated Professions Committee and the Joint Committee on the Public Schools. Due to redistricting, which moved her hometown of Fort Lee to the 37th district, Voss did not run for reelection in 2011 and was replaced on the ballot by Tim Eustace. Instead, she ran for and won a seat on the Bergen County Board of County Commissioners.
