= John Skevin =

American politician

John M. Skevin (June 14, 1927 – October 18, 1993) was an American Democratic Party politician who served in both houses of the New Jersey Legislature.

== Early life and education ==
Born in West New York, New Jersey, Skevin attended Memorial High School and graduated from St. John's University and St. John's University School of Law after completing his military service in the United States Army.

== Political career ==
Skevin lost his first bid for Assemblyman in 1963. He was elected to the New Jersey General Assembly in 1965, but was defeated for re-election two years later by Republicans William Crane and Michael Ferrara. He ran again in 1969, but lost the Democratic primary to incumbent Lee Carlton and Vincente Tibbs.

A resident of Hackensack, New Jersey, Skevin was elected to represent the 38th Legislative District in the New Jersey Senate in 1973, beating Joseph Ventricelli in the Democratic primary and incumbent Republican Sen. Frederick Wendel in the general election. He was re-elected in 1977 against former Hackensack Mayor Frank A. Buono, Jr. In 1981, he lost his bid for a third term to Republican John B. Paolella. A 1983 comeback bid was unsuccessful; he lost the Democratic primary to his former running mate, Assemblyman Paul Contillo.

In 1986, Skevin was disbarred for misappropriating clients' funds after the New Jersey Supreme Court ruled that he combined personal funds with an attorney trust account that ran a $133,500 deficit.
