= Lisa Swain =

American politician (born 1958)

Member of the New Jersey General Assembly from the 38th district
- Incumbent
- Assumed office May 24, 2018 Serving with Chris Tully
- Preceded by: Joseph Lagana; Tim Eustace

Personal details
- Born: April 1958 (age 68)
- Party: Democratic
- Spouse: Ron Bienstock
- Children: 2
- Education: University of Rochester (BA); New York University (MA)
- Website: Legislative web page

Lisa Swain (born April 1958) is an American Democratic Party politician. A resident of Fair Lawn, she has represented the 38th Legislative District in the New Jersey General Assembly since she was appointed to the seat in May 2018.

== Political career ==
Swain was the Mayor of Fair Lawn, New Jersey, for two terms and had previously been a member of Fair Lawn's council for 11 years. Swain and Chris Tully were appointed to the New Jersey General Assembly's 38th District seats in May 2018 after Assemblymen Joseph Lagana and Tim Eustace both resigned from their seats to move on to other positions. In the November 6, 2018, special election to complete the unexpired Assembly terms, Swain and Tully defeated Republicans Gail Horton and Jayme Ouellete.

=== Committees ===
Committee assignments for the 2024—2025 Legislative Session are:

- Appropriations (as chair)
- State and Local Government (as vice-chair)
- Education

=== District 38 ===
Each of the 40 districts in the New Jersey Legislature has one representative in the New Jersey Senate and two members in the New Jersey General Assembly. The representatives from the 38th District for the 2024—2025 Legislative Session are:

- Senator Joseph Lagana (D)
- Assemblywoman Lisa Swain (D)
- Assemblyman Chris Tully (D)

== Personal life ==
She is Jewish.

== Electoral history ==
38th Legislative District General Election, 2023
Party	Candidate	Votes	%
Democratic	Lisa Swain (incumbent)	27,717	28.3
Democratic	Chris Tully (incumbent)	27,304	27.9
Republican	Gail Horton	21,517	22.0
Republican	Barry Wilkes	21,490	21.9
Total votes		98,028	100.0
Democratic hold			
Democratic hold			

38th legislative district general election, 2021
Party	Candidate	Votes	%
Democratic	Lisa Swain (incumbent)	34,226	26.52%
Democratic	Chris Tully (incumbent)	33,444	25.92%
Republican	Alfonso Mastrofilipo Jr.	30,777	23.85%
Republican	Gerard "Jerry" Taylor	30,597	23.71%
Total votes		129,044	100.0
Democratic hold			

38th Legislative District General Election, 2019
Party	Candidate	Votes	%
Democratic	Lisa Swain (incumbent)	19,887	27.22%
Democratic	P. Christopher Tully (incumbent)	19,571	26.79%
Republican	Christopher DiPiazza	16,872	23.1%
Republican	Michael Kazimir	16,724	22.89%
Total votes		72,851	100%
Democratic hold			

38th Legislative District Special Election, 2018
Party	Candidate	Votes	%
Democratic	Lisa Swain (incumbent)	47,865	59.7%
Republican	Gail Horton	32,310	40.3%
Total votes		80,175	100%
Democratic hold			
