= Joseph Lagana =

American politician (born 1978)

Joe Lagana

Member of the New Jersey Senate from the 38th district
- Incumbent
- Assumed office April 12, 2018
- Preceded by: Robert M. Gordon

Member of the New Jersey General Assembly from the 38th district
- In office January 14, 2014 – April 12, 2018 Serving with Tim Eustace
- Preceded by: Paul Contillo
- Succeeded by: Lisa Swain; Chris Tully

Personal details
- Born: December 15, 1978 (age 47)
- Spouse: Jamie Lagana
- Education: Fordham University (BA); Western Michigan University (JD)
- Website: Legislative webpage

Joseph A. Lagana (born December 15, 1978) is an American attorney and Democratic Party politician who has represented the 38th Legislative District in the New Jersey Senate since 2018. He served in the New Jersey General Assembly from 2014 to 2018.

== Personal ==
Lagana was raised in Ridgefield and graduated from Ridgefield Memorial High School. He attended Fordham University, where he received a B.A. in history in 2000 and later attended the Western Michigan University Cooley Law School where he received his J.D. in 2004. He has served as a clerk to Superior Court Judge John A. Conte before joining Chasan Leyner & Lamparello, a law firm in Secaucus as a partner. He served on the Ridgefield planning board.

He is married to Jamie Lagana and has three daughters.

== Paramus borough council ==
In April 2009, he moved to Paramus, New Jersey. Lagana and his Democratic running mate defeated two incumbent Republican councilmembers in the Paramus borough council elections of 2011. After Democrats gained a majority of the six-person borough council after the 2012 elections, Lagana was named council president in January 2013.

== New Jersey General Assembly ==
Lagana declared his candidacy for the 38th district in the November 2013 elections, to succeed Connie Wagner, who was not running for reelection. When Wagner resigned in September, Lagana indicated that he was not interested in filling the remainder of her term; 38th District Democrats chose former assemblyman and state senator Paul Contillo to fill the remainder of her term. Lagana won the election and was sworn in on January 14, 2014, at the start of the 2014 session.

Lagana served as the Assembly's deputy parliamentarian from 2016 to 2017.

== New Jersey Senate ==
After Robert M. Gordon resigned on April 4, 2018, to become a commissioner of the New Jersey Board of Public Utilities, Lagana was appointed to the Senate on April 12, 2018, to fill the vacancy. He won a November 6, 2018, special election to complete Gordon's unexpired term, defeating Republican Daisy Ortiz Berger.

=== Committees ===
Committee assignments for the 2024—2025 Legislative Session are:

- Labor (as chair)
- Judiciary

=== District 38 ===
Each of the 40 districts in the New Jersey Legislature has one representative in the New Jersey Senate and two members in the New Jersey General Assembly. The representatives from the 38th District for the 2024—2025 Legislative Session are:

- Senator Joseph Lagana (D)
- Assemblywoman Lisa Swain (D)
- Assemblyman Chris Tully (D)

== Electoral history ==
=== Senate ===
38th Legislative District General Election, 2023
Party	Candidate	Votes	%
Democratic	Joseph A. Lagana (incumbent)	28,447	57.1
Republican	Micheline B. Attieh	21,361	42.9
Total votes		49,808	100.0
Democratic hold			

38th Legislative District general election, 2021
Party	Candidate	Votes	%
Democratic	Joseph A. Lagana (incumbent)	34,895	52.90
Republican	Richard Garcia	31,069	47.10
Total votes		65,964	100.0
Democratic hold			

38th Legislative District special election, 2018
Party	Candidate	Votes	%
Democratic	Joseph A. Lagana (incumbent)	48,451	60.1
Republican	Daisy Ortiz Berger	32,140	39.9
Total votes		80,591	100.0
Democratic hold			

=== General Assembly ===
38th Legislative District general election
Party	Candidate	Votes	%	±%
Democratic	Joseph A. Lagana (incumbent)	30,800	29.3	▲0.2
Democratic	Tim Eustace (incumbent)	30,727	29.2	▲0.1
Republican	William Leonard	21,541	20.5	▼1.4
Republican	Christopher B. Wolf	21,525	20.5	▲0.6
Independent- NJ Awakens	Dev Goswami	533	0.5	N/A
Total votes		105,126	100.0	
Democratic hold				

38th Legislative District general election
Party	Candidate	Votes	%
Democratic	Tim Eustace (incumbent)	19,563	29.1
Democratic	Joseph Lagana (incumbent)	19,511	29.0
Republican	Mark DiPisa	14,721	21.9
Republican	Anthony Cappola	13,339	19.8
Write-ins	Personal choice	95	0.1
Total votes		67,229	100.0
Democratic hold			

38th Legislative District general election
Party	Candidate	Votes	%
Democratic	Joseph Lagana	26,279	25.2
Democratic	Tim Eustace (incumbent)	26,021	25.0
Republican	Joseph Scarpa	25,965	24.9
Republican	Joan Fragala	25,836	24.8
Total votes		104,101	100.0
Democratic hold			

New Jersey General Assembly
Preceded by Paul Contillo	Member of the New Jersey General Assembly from the 38th district 2014–2018; Served alongside: Tim Eustace	Succeeded by Lisa Swain; Chris Tully
New Jersey Senate
Preceded by Robert M. Gordon	Member of the New Jersey Senate from the 38th district 2018–present	Incumbent
