= Pat Schuber =

American politician (born 1947)

Commissioner of the Port Authority of New York and New Jersey
- In office July 1, 2011 – July 2, 2017
- Preceded by: Anthony Coscia
- Succeeded by: Kevin J. O'Toole

2nd County Executive of Bergen County
- In office January 1, 1991 – December 31, 2003
- Preceded by: William D. McDowell
- Succeeded by: Dennis McNerney

Member of the New Jersey General Assembly from the 38th district
- In office January 12, 1982 – December 31, 1990 Serving with Louis F. Kosco and Patrick J. Roma
- Preceded by: John B. Paolella
- Succeeded by: Rose Marie Heck

Mayor of Bogota
- In office 1980–1984
- Preceded by: Eugene J. Brophy
- Succeeded by: Alex F. Kelemen

Personal details
- Born: April 15, 1947 (age 79)
- Party: Republican
- Education: Fordham University (BA, JD)

William "Pat" Schuber (born April 15, 1947) is an American Republican Party politician who served as Mayor of Bogota, represented the 38th legislative district in the New Jersey General Assembly and served 12 years as the Bergen County Executive.

== Background ==
Born on April 15, 1947, Schuber graduated from Bogota High School.

Schuber received a BA from Fordham University and was awarded a JD from the Fordham University School of Law. He has been a senior lecturer on the faculty of Fairleigh Dickinson University.

== Political offices ==
Schuber served as Mayor of Bogota for four years from 1980 until 1984. He represented the 38th legislative district in the New Jersey General Assembly from 1982 to 1990 and served 12 years as the Bergen County Executive.

== Port Authority of New York and New Jersey ==
Schuber was appointed to a six-year term on the board of commissioners of the Port Authority of New York and New Jersey (PANYNJ) by Governor of New Jersey Chris Christie in July 2011. He is one of several PANYNJ personnel subpoenaed by the New Jersey Legislature panel investigating the Fort Lee lane closure scandal. Testimony given in September 2016 by federal prosecution witness David Wildstein claims that Schuber was aware the lane closures were planned. In February 2017, it was announced that Kevin J. O'Toole would succeed him as commissioner.

== See also ==
- Governorship of Chris Christie
- List of people involved in the Fort Lee lane closure scandal

New Jersey General Assembly
Preceded by John B. Paolella	Member of the New Jersey General Assembly from the 38th district 1982–1990; With: Louis F. Kosco and Patrick J. Roma	Succeeded by Rose Marie Heck
Political offices
Preceded by William D. McDowell	County Executive of Bergen County, New Jersey; 1991–2003	Succeeded by Dennis McNerney
