= Chris Tully =

American politician (born 1982)

Member of the New Jersey General Assembly from the 38th district
- Incumbent
- Assumed office May 24, 2018 Serving with Lisa Swain
- Preceded by: Tim Eustace; Joseph Lagana

Personal details
- Born: Peter Christopher Tully; March 31, 1982 (age 44)
- Party: Democratic
- Education: Northeastern University (BA)
- Website: Legislative web page

Peter Christopher Tully (born March 31, 1982) is an American Democratic Party politician who has represented the 38th Legislative District in the New Jersey Assembly since 2018. For the 2022–23 legislative session he serves as the Deputy Majority Leader.

Raised in Bergenfield, Tully graduated from Bergenfield High School and Northeastern University.

== Political career ==
Tully served on the Borough of Bergenfield council from 2009 to 2017, and was Council President in 2011 and 2014. Tully also previously served as an aide to U.S. Representative Josh Gottheimer.

== New Jersey General Assembly ==
Tully and Lisa Swain were appointed to the New Jersey General Assembly's 38th District seats in May 2018 after Assemblymen Joseph Lagana and Tim Eustace both resigned from their seats to move on to other positions. In the November 6, 2018, special election to complete the unexpired Assembly terms, Swain and Tully defeated Republicans Gail Horton and Jayme Ouellete.

In 2020, he was one of the co-sponsors of Assembly Bill 4454 (now N.J.S.A. 18A:35-4.36a) which requires that a curriculum on diversity and inclusion be part of the school curriculum for students in kindergarten through twelfth grade.

=== Committee assignments ===
Committee assignments for the 2024–2025 Legislative Session are:

- Science, Innovation and Technology (as chair)
- Commerce, Economic Development and Agriculture (as vice-chair)
- Health

=== District 38 ===
Each of the 40 districts in the New Jersey Legislature has one representative in the New Jersey Senate and two members in the New Jersey General Assembly. The representatives from the 38th District for the 2024–2025 Legislative Session are:

- Senator Joseph Lagana (D)
- Assemblywoman Lisa Swain (D)
- Assemblyman Chris Tully (D)

== Electoral history ==
38th Legislative District General Election, 2023
| Party | Candidate | Votes | % |
|---|---|---|---|
| Democratic | Lisa Swain (incumbent) | 27,717 | 28.3 |
| Democratic | Chris Tully (incumbent) | 27,304 | 27.9 |
| Republican | Gail Horton | 21,517 | 22.0 |
| Republican | Barry Wilkes | 21,490 | 21.9 |
| Total votes | | 98,028 | 100.0 |
| Democratic hold | | | |
| Democratic hold | | | |

38th legislative district general election, 2021
| Party | Candidate | Votes | % |
|---|---|---|---|
| Democratic | Lisa Swain (incumbent) | 34,226 | 26.52% |
| Democratic | Chris Tully (incumbent) | 33,444 | 25.92% |
| Republican | Alfonso Mastrofilipo Jr. | 30,777 | 23.85% |
| Republican | Gerard "Jerry" Taylor | 30,597 | 23.71% |
| Total votes | | 129,044 | 100.0 |
| Democratic hold | | | |

38th Legislative District General Election, 2019
| Party | Candidate | Votes | % |
|---|---|---|---|
| Democratic | Lisa Swain (incumbent) | 19,887 | 27.22% |
| Democratic | P. Christopher Tully (incumbent) | 19,571 | 26.79% |
| Republican | Christopher DiPiazza | 16,872 | 23.1% |
| Republican | Michael Kazimir | 16,724 | 22.89% |
| Total votes | | 72,851 | 100% |
| Democratic hold | | | |

38th Legislative District Special Election, 2018
| Party | Candidate | Votes | % |
|---|---|---|---|
| Democratic | Chris Tully (incumbent) | 46,406 | 59.3% |
| Republican | Jayme Ouellette | 31,833 | 40.7% |
| Total votes | | 78,239 | 100% |
| Democratic hold | | | |
