= Robert M. Gordon (politician) =

American politician (born 1950)

Member of the New Jersey Senate from the 38th district
- In office January 8, 2008 – April 4, 2018
- Preceded by: Joseph Coniglio
- Succeeded by: Joseph Lagana

Member of the New Jersey General Assembly from the 38th district
- In office January 13, 2004 – January 8, 2008 Serving with Joan Voss
- Preceded by: Rose Heck; Matt Ahearn
- Succeeded by: Connie Wagner

Personal details
- Born: July 3, 1950 (age 76) Paterson, New Jersey, U.S.
- Spouse: Gail Gordon
- Education: Williams College (BA); University of California, Berkeley (MPP); University of Pennsylvania (MBA)
- Website: Government website

Robert M. "Bob" Gordon (born July 3, 1950) is an American politician serving as a commissioner of the New Jersey Board of Public Utilities. Prior to being commissioner, Gordon was a Democratic Party politician who served in the New Jersey Senate from January 8, 2008 to April 4, 2018 representing the 38th Legislative District. He also served in the General Assembly from 2004 to 2008.

== Early life and education ==
Gordon was born in Paterson and grew up in Fair Lawn, New Jersey. He earned a Bachelor of Arts degree in political economy from Williams College in 1972, a Master of Public Policy from the University of California, Berkeley, and an MBA in finance and health care management from the Wharton School of the University of Pennsylvania in 1978.

== Career ==
Gordon began his career an analyst in the Congressional Budget Office from 1975 to 1977.

Gordon served on the Fair Lawn Borough Council from 1986 to 1995, on its Planning Board from 1986 to 1995 and was Mayor of Fair Lawn, New Jersey from 1988 to 1991. He was the Fair Lawn Fire Commissioner from 1986 to 1995 and served on the Fair Lawn Ethics Board from 1999 to 2003. During this time he also served as an aide in the New Jersey Office of the Governor from 1990 to 1991. He was also a delegate to the Democratic National Convention in 1988 and 1992. In 1996, Gordon ran in the Democratic primary for the open Congressional seat in the 9th district but was defeated in a landslide against former Englewood mayor Steve Rothman.

He served on the Democratic State Committee from 1993 to 1998. Gordon is a real estate development consultant in addition to being a state senator.

=== New Jersey Assembly ===
In the 2003 election, Gordon and Joan Voss unseated the incumbents, Green Party candidate Matt Ahearn and Republican Rose Marie Heck, to win the Assembly seats. Bergen County Freeholder and Paramus Councilwoman Connie Wagner replaced Gordon on the Democrats' 2007 Assembly ticket.

=== New Jersey Senate ===
Gordon was the 2007 Democratic nominee to succeed outgoing Senator Joseph Coniglio and won the seat with 59.9% of the vote. He was re-elected in 2011 and served on the Legislative Oversight Committee (Chair), the Transportation Committee (Vice-Chair), and the Health, Human Services and Senior Citizens Committee.

In the 2013 election, the then-increasingly popular Governor Chris Christie targeted the 38th Legislative District to unseat Gordon. However, Gordon prevailed who said he was "pleased that he's on Christie's radar screen." He became one of the leading proponents of increased accountability and transparency at the Port Authority of New York and New Jersey after the 2013 Fort Lee Bridgegate Scandal.

Gordon also served as chair of the Senate Transportation Committee and co-chair of a special panel which investigated problems with NJ Transit.

=== Board of Public Utilities ===
Gordon had been a Commissioner of the New Jersey Board of Public Utilities from April 2018 through April 2023, when he retired from State service. He was originally appointed by Governor Phil Murphy to fill the Commissioner role.

== Personal life ==
The Democratic lawmaker is married to Gail Balph Gordon, a Republican who served on the staff of Richard Thornburgh, the former Pennsylvania Governor and United States Attorney General, and as a member of Governor Chris Christie's campaign finance committee and his transition team. In February, 2013, Gail Gordon joined the Florio Perrucci Steinhardt & Fader law firm, which is headed by former Democratic Governor Jim Florio.

== Election history ==
New Jersey State Senate elections, 2013
Party	Candidate	Votes	%
Democratic	Robert M. Gordon (incumbent)	27,779	51.9
Republican	Fernando A. Alonso	25,767	48.1
Democratic hold			

New Jersey State Senate elections, 2011
Party	Candidate	Votes	%
Democratic	Robert M. Gordon (incumbent)	22,299	53.0
Republican	John J. Driscoll, Jr.	19,745	47.0
Democratic hold			

New Jersey State Senate elections, 2007
Party	Candidate	Votes	%
Democratic	Robert M. Gordon	22,351	59.9
Republican	Robert Colletti	14,949	40.1
Democratic hold			

New Jersey Senate
Preceded by Joseph Coniglio	Member of the New Jersey Senate for the 38th District; January 8, 2008 – April 4, 2018	Succeeded by Joseph Lagana
New Jersey General Assembly
Preceded by Matt Ahearn; Rose Heck	Member of the New Jersey General Assembly for the 38th District; January 13, 2004 – January 8, 2008; With: Joan Voss	Succeeded by Connie Wagner
