= John B. Paolella =

American politician (born 1949)

Member of the New Jersey Senate from the 38th district
- In office January 12, 1982 – January 12, 1984
- Preceded by: John Skevin
- Succeeded by: Paul Contillo

Member of the New Jersey General Assembly from the 38th district
- In office January 8, 1980 – January 12, 1982
- Preceded by: Robert Burns; Paul Contillo
- Succeeded by: Pat Schuber

Personal details
- Born: February 14, 1949 (age 77) Hackensack, New Jersey
- Party: Republican
- Education: Harvard University; Seton Hall University (J.D.)

John B. Paolella (born February 14, 1949) is an American Republican Party politician who served in both houses of the New Jersey Legislature from the 38th district– one term in the New Jersey General Assembly and one term in the New Jersey Senate.

Born in Hackensack on February 14, 1949, Paolella attended Bergen Catholic High School and graduated from Harvard University in 1971. He received a J.D. degree from Seton Hall University School of Law and was admitted to the New Jersey Bar in 1976. He served as a legal advisor to then-Assemblyman W. Cary Edwards.

In his first bid for the Legislature, Paolella and Republican running mate Louis F. Kosco defeated incumbent Democratic Assemblymen Robert Burns and Paul Contillo. After serving one term there, Paolella ran for the Senate in 1981 and defeated incumbent John Skevin. Paolella served a two-year term in the Senate before being defeated for reelection in 1983 by Contillo who went on to serve for eight more years in the Senate and a second brief stint in the Assembly in 2013.

Paolella later moved to Bay Head and got involved in local politics there. In 2014, running on a Republican ticket with fellow Bergen County transplant Steve Lonegan, he ran for a seat on the Ocean County Board of Chosen Freeholders seeking to defeat long-time incumbent Freeholder Joseph H. Vicari. Vicari ultimately defeated Paolella nearly 76%–24%.
