= Joseph Coniglio =

American politician (born 1943)

Member of the New Jersey Senate from the 38th district
- In office January 8, 2002 – January 8, 2008
- Preceded by: Louis F. Kosco
- Succeeded by: Robert M. Gordon

Personal details
- Born: February 6, 1943 (age 83)
- Party: Democratic

Joseph Coniglio (born February 6, 1943) is an American Democratic Party politician, who served in the New Jersey State Senate from 2002 until 2007, where he represented the 38th Legislative District. Coniglio, formerly a plumber, also served on the Senate Labor Committee and the Senate Budget & Appropriations Committee. In 2009 Coniglio was convicted of extortion and served 20 months in jail.

== Career ==
As a State Senator, Coniglio sponsored a number of initiatives which have been signed into law. Reacting to security concerns following the September 11 terrorist attacks, he sponsored a law requiring background checks for airport employees with access to restricted areas within the airport. He also sponsored measures creating a prostate cancer education and research program and encouraging more individuals to enter the nursing profession by giving them an income tax deduction for up to three years.

In response to escalating violence at youth sporting events nationwide, Coniglio pushed for a bill allowing municipalities and boards of education to establish athletic codes of conduct for behavior at sporting events. Violators of these codes of conduct can be ejected from games and required to participate in anger management programs before being allowed to return.

Coniglio was a prime sponsor of New Jersey's "Do Not Call" list legislation, one of the strongest telemarketing restricting measure in the nation. The law requires telemarketers to subscribe to a "Do Not Call" list, and makes penalty provisions for telemarketers who violate the list. He also sponsored the State's historic "predatory lending" law, which protects homeowners from unscrupulous subprime lenders who charge exorbitant interest rates on home loans with the intent to foreclose on the home.

Coniglio also sponsored bills cracking down on fraudulent solicitations on behalf of charities, upgrading penalties for identity theft and the sale of false IDs, and providing state-funded health care and increased pay for New Jersey Army National Guard members on active duty within the state.

Before coming to the Senate, Coniglio served on several different committees within his hometown including the Paramus Borough Council from 1981 to 1990, where he served as Council President from 1985 to 1990, the Paramus Board of Adjustment (1976–1981), and the Paramus Shade Tree Commission from 1974 to 1976.

=== Conviction and incarceration ===
In 2009, Coniglio was convicted of five counts of mail fraud and one count of extortion. The mail fraud conviction was later thrown out of court, but the extortion cost Coniglio 20 months of confinement in a federal prison for corruption. He was also forced to pay $15,000 in fines.
