= Connie Wagner =

American politician (born 1948)

Member of the New Jersey General Assembly from the 38th district
- In office January 8, 2008 – October 1, 2013 Serving with Joan Voss
- Preceded by: Robert M. Gordon

Personal details
- Born: July 7, 1948 (age 78)
- Party: Democratic
- Website: Legislative webpage

Concetta "Connie" Wagner (born July 7, 1948) is an American Democratic Party politician, who had served in the New Jersey General Assembly since January 8, 2008, where she had represented the 38th legislative district until her resignation on October 1, 2013.

Wagner received a B.A. from Trenton State College (now The College of New Jersey) with a major in education, and was awarded an M.A. from Montclair State University in Student Affairs.

Wagner served on the Bergen County Board of Chosen Freeholders in 2007, and was a member of the Paramus Borough Council from 2002 to 2007. Before she was elected Assemblywoman, Wagner worked as a high school guidance counselor at Paramus High School.

== General Assembly ==
Wagner was selected by a special meeting of the Bergen County Democratic Organization in September 2007 to fill a vacancy on the Democratic ballot for Assembly when Bob Gordon became a State Senator from District 38 to replace the retiring Joseph Coniglio. At the time Wagner was serving as both a county freeholder and borough councilwoman. She stepped down from both posts when she took her Assembly seat and served with Joan Voss as District 38's Assembly members.

Wagner ran for re-election twice and was returned to office both times. She served during the 2012-2013 Legislative term with Tim Eustace, who was elected to replace Voss after she decided to run for a Freeholder seat.

In the Assembly, Wagner served on the Joint Committee on the Public Schools (as co-chair), on the Labor Committee (as vice-chair), Higher Education Committee and the Education.

Wagner had announced that she was not going to run for re-election in 2013 and decided to step down from her seat effective October 1, 2013, so that she could have the opportunity to spend more time with her family in Florida. Paramus Council President Joseph Lagana had already been given Wagner's ballot position in the 38th District for the November general election but announced that he planned to complete his term on the Borough Council and would not take the seat on an interim basis. The Bergen County Democratic Organization conducted a special convention to consider potential candidates to fill the position on an interim basis.

Political offices
| Preceded by Robert M. Gordon | New Jersey State Assemblywoman - District 38; 2008 - 2013 | Succeeded by Pending |
Political offices
| Preceded by Valerie Huttle | Bergen County Freeholder; 2007 | Succeeded by Vernon Walton |
