= The Class of COVID-19 =

Book of student essays about the COVID-19 pandemic

- First edition paperback cover
- Editor: Shawn Adler
- Language: English
- Publication date: 2 June 2020
- Publication place: United States
- Media type: print (paperback) and ebook
- Pages: 149 pp
- ISBN: 979-8-650-565253

The Class of COVID-19: Insights from the Inside is a collection of writing about the COVID-19 pandemic by students from Cliffside Park High School, in Cliffside Park, New Jersey, published on 2 June 2020. It contains pieces by forty-six students and was edited by Cliffside Park High School English teacher Shawn Adler. The collection was brought together, according to Adler, so that "people have this as a primary document for as long as they are learning about what we're going through in history."

The book has attracted national press coverage in the United States from CNN, the Wall Street Journal, NBC Nightly News, People, Yahoo, Al Día, and other outlets. It has also garnered praise from a range of New Jersey politicians, including Governor Phil Murphy, U.S. Senator Cory Booker, and Representative Bill Pascrell. A second volume, with twenty-four new pieces of writing by different student authors, appeared in January 2021.
