= Cliffside Park High School =

High school in Bergen County, New Jersey, US

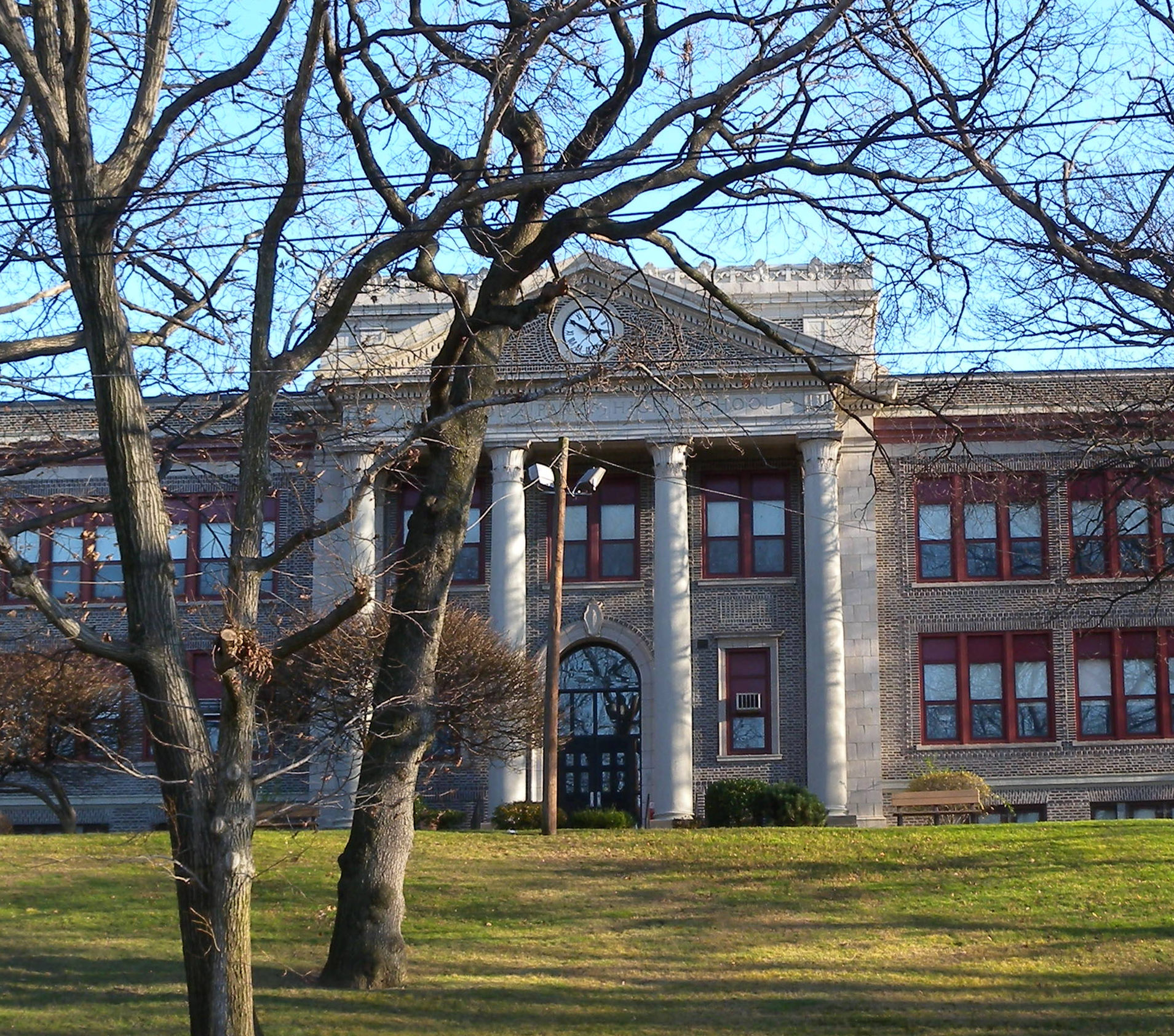

Location
- 64 Riverview Avenue; Cliffside Park, Bergen County, New Jersey 07010; United States; 40.821°N 73.987°W

Information
- Type: Public high school
- School district: Cliffside Park School District
- NCES School ID: 340327000304
- Principal: Jonathan Jannucci
- Faculty: 94.0 FTEs
- Grades: 9–12
- Enrollment: 1,314 (as of 2024–25)
- Student to teacher ratio: 14.0:1
- Colors: Red and Black
- Athletics conference: Big North Conference (general); North Jersey Super Football Conference (football)
- Team name: Red Raiders
- Rival: Ridgefield Park High School
- Publication: The Cliffside Courier
- Website: www.cliffsidepark.edu/163748_3

Cliffside Park High School is a four-year comprehensive public high school that serves students in ninth through twelfth grade from Cliffside Park, in Bergen County, in the U.S. state of New Jersey, operating as the lone secondary school of the Cliffside Park School District.

Students from Fairview attend the school as part of a sending/receiving relationship with the Fairview Public Schools.

As of the 2024–25 school year, the school had an enrollment of 1,314 students and 94.0 classroom teachers (on an FTE basis), for a student–teacher ratio of 14.0:1. There were 821 students (62.5% of enrollment) eligible for free lunch and 102 (7.8% of students) eligible for reduced-cost lunch. In the 2011–12 school year, 36.1% of students at the high school spoke English as their first language at home, while 44.4% spoke Spanish, 4.4% speak Arabic, 3.8% speak Portuguese, 1.9% speak Korean, 1.9% speak Turkish and 7.6% speak other languages. Among the graduates of the Class of 2010, 51.2% planned to attend four-year colleges, while 38.5% planned on attending two-year colleges.

== Awards, recognition and rankings ==
The school was the 297th-ranked public high school in New Jersey out of 339 schools statewide in New Jersey Monthly magazine's September 2014 cover story on the state's "Top Public High Schools," using a new ranking methodology. The school had been ranked 256th in the state of 328 schools in 2012, after being ranked 235th in 2010 out of 322 schools listed. The magazine ranked the school 220th in 2008 out of 316 schools. The school was ranked 195th in the magazine's September 2006 issue, which surveyed 316 schools across the state.

== Athletics ==
The Cliffside Park High School Red Raiders compete in the Big North Conference, which is comprised of public and private high schools in Bergen and Passaic counties, and was established following a reorganization of sports leagues in Northern New Jersey by the New Jersey State Interscholastic Athletic Association (NJSIAA). The school had previously competed in the Bergen County Scholastic League (BCSL) American Conference, which included public and private high schools located in Bergen and Hudson counties. With 940 students in grades 10–12, the school was classified by the NJSIAA for the 2019–20 school year as Group III for most athletic competition purposes, which included schools with an enrollment of 761 to 1,058 students in that grade range. The football team competes in the Ivy Red division of the North Jersey Super Football Conference, which includes 112 schools competing in 20 divisions, making it the nation's biggest football-only high school sports league. The football team is one of the 12 programs assigned to the two Ivy divisions starting in 2020, which are intended to allow weaker programs ineligible for playoff participation to compete primarily against each other. The school's co-op football team with Ridgefield Memorial High School was classified by the NJSIAA as Group V North for football for 2024–2026, which included schools with 1,317 to 5,409 students.

The boys' basketball team won the Group III state championships in 1941 vs. Bound Brook High School, 1943 vs. Merchantville High School, 1946 vs. Woodrow Wilson High School, 1948 vs. Thomas Edison High School of Elizabeth, 1954 vs. Linden High School and 1955 vs. Springfield High School (since renamed as Jonathan Dayton High School), and won the Group II title in 1971 vs. Haddon Heights High School. Down by six points after the first quarter, the 1941 team pulled ahead by outscoring Bound Brook 12–4 in the second quarter and 11–2 in the third to win the Group III title by a score of 38–31 in the championship game played at the Elizabeth Armory. Led by Gerald Calabrese, the 1943 team defeated Merchantville by a score of 42–26 in the Group III final; a proposal was made to have Cliffside Park play Group II champion Weehawken High School in a fundraiser for the American Red Cross. The 1948 team held off a furious late effort by Thomas Edison of Elizabeth to win the Group III title by a score of 49-47 in the championship game played at the Elizabeth Armory before a crowd of 4,000.

With five touchdowns from their fullback, the 1977 football team won the NJSIAA North I Group III state sectional title with a 37-6 win in the championship game against Indian Hills High School in front of 32,000 fans at Giants Stadium. The school has maintained a rivalry with Ridgefield Park High School since the two schools first played each other, which was listed by The Record as one of the best in Bergen and Passaic counties; though the first game between the two schools was earlier, from 1950 through the 2017 season, Ridgefield Park is ahead with a 38-20-2 record in games between the two schools.

The boys soccer team won the Group II state championship in 2008 (as co-champion with Delran High School) and 2010 (defeating Haddon Heights High School in the final game of the tournament). The 2007 boys soccer team won the North II, Group II state sectional championship with a 1-0 win over Hackettstown High School in the tournament final for the team's second sectional title, the program's only other win coming in 1992 when it won the North I, Group III sectional title. The 2008 team shared the Group II state championship with Delran High School, after a 2-2 tie in which Cliffside Park took a 2-1 lead with a goal with 74 seconds left in regulation but Delran tied the score with a goal nine seconds later. In 2010, the team won its fourth consecutive state sectional title with a 3-1 win against Bernards High School. The 2010 boys soccer team was recognized by The Record as the North Jersey Boys Soccer Team of the Year after winning the Group II state championship with a 1-0 win over Haddon Heights High School, the first sole possession of the state title in the program's history after sharing the Group II title in 2008.

== The Class of COVID-19 ==
Students at the high school published three memoir collections about the COVID-19 pandemic collectively entitled The Class of COVID-19. The first edition, The Class of COVID-19: Insights from the Inside, published in June 2020, contains pieces by forty-six students and was edited by Cliffside Park High School English teacher Shawn Adler. The collection was brought together, according to Adler, so that "people have this as a primary document for as long as they are learning about what we're going through in history."

The book has attracted national press coverage in the United States from CNN, the Wall Street Journal, NBC Nightly News, People, Yahoo, Al Día, and other outlets. It has also garnered praise from a range of New Jersey politicians, including Governor Phil Murphy, U.S. Senator Cory Booker, and Representative Bill Pascrell. A second volume, The Class of COVID-19: Second Wave, with 24 new pieces of writing by different student authors, appeared in January 2021.

== Administration ==
The school's principal is Jonathan Jannucci. His administration team includes two vice principals.

== Notable alumni ==
- Nick Borelli (1905–1992), professional football player who spent one season in the National Football League with the Newark Tornadoes in 1930
- Gerald Calabrese (1925–2015), longtime mayor of Cliffside Park, who played in the NBA for two seasons with the Syracuse Nationals
- Bruce Elia (born 1953), former NFL linebacker, primarily with the San Francisco 49ers
- Fred C. Galda (1918–1997), attorney and politician who served as mayor of Paramus and as a judge on New Jersey Superior Court
- Luke Higgins (1921–1991), football guard who played one season with the Baltimore Colts of the All-America Football Conference
- Ed Mioduszewski (1931–2010), quarterback in the NFL for the Baltimore Colts
- Joe Pantoliano (born 1951), character actor
- Patrick J. Roma (1949–2017), lawyer and politician who represented the 38th Legislative District in the New Jersey General Assembly from 1988 to 1997
- Ted Rzempoluch (born 1941), defensive back in the NFL for the Washington Redskins
- Manny Suárez (born 1993), basketball player who has competed on the Chile national team
- Joseph C. Woodcock (1925–1997), politician who served in the New Jersey General Assembly, New Jersey Senate and as Bergen County Prosecutor
