= Ted Rzempoluch =

American football player (born 1941)

No. 28
- Position: Defensive back

Personal information
- Born: May 31, 1941 (age 85); Jersey City, New Jersey, U.S.
- Listed height: 6 ft 1 in (1.85 m)
- Listed weight: 195 lb (88 kg)

Career information
- High school: Cliffside Park (Cliffside Park, New Jersey)
- College: Virginia
- NFL draft: 1963: undrafted

Career history
- Washington Redskins (1963)

Career NFL statistics
- Games played: 6
- Stats at Pro Football Reference

Theodore Charles Rzempoluch (born May 31, 1941) is an American former professional football player who was a defensive back for one season with the Washington Redskins of the National Football League (NFL). He played college football for the Virginia Cavaliers.

Rzempoluch played high school football at Cliffside Park High School, in Cliffside Park, New Jersey.
