= Ripface Invasion =

American punk band

- Origin: Fairview, New Jersey, U.S.
- Genres: Hardcore, thrash, heavy metal, punk
- Years active: 2010-present
- Label: Scorpion
- Members: Anthony "Red" Paladino; Tom Conti; Dan "Drummer D" Lockhart; Joe EC "Elviz Christ"

Ripface Invasion is an American hardcore punk band based out of New Jersey. The band was formed in December 2010 by Anthony "Red" Paladino, of the band I.D.K. The band's first four-song EP was released on July 5, 2011. They subsequently released a three-song EP as well as a seven-inch record.

The band has played locally since their start, and have released a music video for their song "The Last One On Earth" which was released independently. In 2012, the band was signed to NJ hardcore punk label Scorpion Records and released their three-song EP To Not Give In.

== Videography ==
- "The Last One On Earth" (2011)
- "To Not Give In" (2012)

== Current members ==
- Anthony "Red" Paladino - vocals
- Joe EC - guitar
- Tom Conti - bass
- Dan "Drummer D" Lockhart - drums

=== Former members ===
- Rey Fonseca
- Ron Taylor
- Fabio Amato
- Mike Nappi
- Anthony "Lefty" Clemente
- Ken Pescatore

=== Live / Touring Support ===
- Joe EC (Elviz Christ) - guitar
