= Jose Russo =

- Born: March 24, 1942
- Died: September 24, 2021 (aged 79); Abington Township, Pennsylvania
- Education: Agustin Alvarez National College (BS); National University of Cuyo (MD)
- Awards: Received Hispanic Heritage Award (2018)
- Scientific career
- Workplaces: Fox Chase Cancer Center
- Website: www.foxchase.org/jose-russo/

Jose Russo was a senior member and professor at Fox Chase Cancer Center, director of both the Irma H Russo, MD- Breast Cancer Research Laboratory and the Environment Research Center at FCCC-Temple Health. He was also a professor of biochemistry at the Temple Medical School in Philadelphia and an adjunct professor in pathology and cell biology at Thomas Jefferson College of Medicine.

== Education ==
Russo was born in Rivadavia, Argentina, a small town east of the city of Mendoza, in 1942. He earned his bachelor's degree in 1959 from Agustin Alvarez National College, Mendoza, Argentina. In the year 1967, he received his physician and surgeon degree from the School Medicine, National University of Cuyo.

He received four years post-doctoral fellowship from the National Scientific and Technical Research Council (CONICET) where he completed his formation as a physician-scientist that started in 1962 in the Experimental Pathology Department. After finishing his training in research in Argentina he obtained a fellowship from the Rockefeller Foundation in 1971 and two years later he was hired as a research scientist at the Michigan Cancer Foundation, Detroit, Michigan.

== Research and career ==
In 1982, he was board-certified by the American Board of Pathology, and in the same year he became the chairman of the department of pathology of the Michigan Cancer Foundation. In 1991 he moved to Philadelphia, becoming chairman of the department of pathology at the Fox Chase Cancer Center. He also became adjunct professor of pathology and cell biology at Thomas Jefferson College of Medicine and Adjunct Professor of Pathology and Laboratory Medicine at the University of Pennsylvania School of Medicine. In 2010 he became professor of biochemistry at Temple University.

Russo served as a professor and senior member at Fox Chase Cancer Center from 1991 and director of the Breast Cancer Research Laboratory that was renamed in 2013 the Irma H Russo MD-Breast Cancer Research Laboratory, in honor of his late wife. From 2002, he was the director of the Breast Cancer and the Environment Research Center at FCCC. Russo also served as the director of the Department of Defense Postdoctoral Breast Cancer Training Program at the FCCC from January 2000 to December 2004.

From 1991 to 1994 he was the chairman of the Department of Pathology, Fox Chase Cancer Center. Russo also worked as the chairman in the Department of Pathology at the Michigan Cancer Foundation from 1982 to 1991.

Russo authored more than 450 publications, including 15 books. According to Scopus, Russo is one of the most cited researchers, his research has been cited over 17,000 times and has an h-index of 69.

== Awards and honors ==
Russo was the recipient of the Hispanic Heritage Award by AL DIA. In the year, 2009 he was also awarded the Michael Hill's Lecture Award. Russo was the recipient of the Project Award from the American Cancer Society in 2008. He was an editor for the Journal of Oncogenesis and also serving as a senior editor for the Journal of Future Medicine.

== Books ==
- Immunocytochemistry in Tumor Diagnosis.
- Russo, J. and Russo, I.H. “Molecular Basis of Breast Cancer”, Springer –Verlag, Heidelberg, Germany, 2004.
- Russo, J. “Breast Cancer, and the Environment”, Springer, NY, 2011.

== Patents ==
Jose Russo obtained several patents for his inventions.

- hCG therapy for the treatment of metastatic breast cancer, (2000).
- Identification and characterization of pregnancy-associated genetic signatures and use thereof for diagnosis and treatment of breast cancer, (2010); now abandoned.
- Compositions and methods for the prevention of cancer in high risk patients, (2015).
- Human chorionic gonadotropin variant peptides and treatment of breast cancer, (2019); application.

== Publications ==
- Jose Russo, Lee K. Tay, and Irma H. Russo. "Differentiation of the mammary gland and susceptibility to carcinogenesis". Journal of Breast Cancer Research and Treatment.
- Jose Russo, Barry A. Gusterson, Adrianne E. Rogers, Irma H. Russo, Sefton R. Wellings, and Matthew J. Van Zwieten. "Comparative Study of Human and Rat Mammary Tumorigenesis". Journal of Pathology Reviews.
- Jose Russo, Raquel Moral, Gabriela A Balogh, Daniel Mailo, and Irma H Russo. "The protective role of pregnancy in breast cancer". Journal of Breast Cancer Research.
- Jose Russo, Yun-Fu Hu, Xiaoqi Yang, and Irma H. Russo. "Developmental, Cellular, and Molecular Basis of Human Breast Cancer". JNCI Monographs.
- Jose Russo, M.Hasan Lareef, Gabriela Balogh, Shanchun Guo, and Irma H.Russo. "Estrogen and its metabolites are carcinogenic agents in human breast epithelial cells". The Journal of Steroid Biochemistry and Molecular Biology.
