= Luke Higgins =

American football player (1921–1991)

No. 31
- Position: Guard

Personal information
- Born: May 3, 1921; Edgewater, New Jersey, U.S.
- Died: October 11, 1991 (aged 70); Largo, Florida, U.S.
- Listed height: 6 ft 0 in (1.83 m)
- Listed weight: 210 lb (95 kg)

Career information
- High school: Cliffside Park (Cliffside Park, New Jersey)
- College: Notre Dame (1941–1942, 1946)
- NFL draft: 1945: 23rd round, 235th overall pick

Career history
- Baltimore Colts (1947)

Awards and highlights
- National champion (1946)

Career AAFC statistics
- Games played: 11
- Stats at Pro Football Reference

Luke Martin Higgins (May 3, 1921 – October 11, 1991) was an American professional football guard who played one season with the Baltimore Colts of the All-America Football Conference (AAFC). He played college football at the University of Notre Dame.

== Early life ==
Luke Martin Higgins was born on May 3, 1921, in Edgewater, New Jersey. He attended Cliffside Park High School in Cliffside Park, New Jersey.

== College and military career ==
Higgins played college football for the Notre Dame Fighting Irish of the University of Notre Dame from 1941 to 1942. His football career was interrupted by a stint in the United States Marine Corps during World War II. He was awarded a Purple Heart after being seriously wounded in Italy in 1944. Higgins returned to Notre Dame in 1946 and played for the football team that season. The 1946 Fighting Irish were AP Poll national champions. Higgins also participated in the shot put during his time at Notre Dame.

== Professional career ==
Higgins was selected by the Cleveland Rams in the 23rd round, with the 235th overall pick, of the 1945 NFL draft. He signed with the Baltimore Colts of the All-America Football Conference (AAFC) in 1947. He played in 11 games for the Colts during the 1947 season.

== Personal life ==
Higgins died on October 11, 1991, in Largo, Florida.
