= Fairview Public Schools =

School district in Bergen County, New Jersey, US

Address
- 130 Hamilton Avenue Fairview, Bergen County, New Jersey, 07022; United States
- Coordinates: 40.812835°N 73.997229°W

District information
- Grades: PreK to 8
- Superintendent: David Sleppin
- Business administrator: John Bussanich
- Schools: 3

Students and staff
- Enrollment: 1,557 (as of 2021–22)
- Faculty: 104.5 FTEs
- Student–teacher ratio: 14.9:1

Other information
- District Factor Group: A
- Website: fairviewps.org
Ind.	Per pupil	District spending	Rank (*)	K-8 average	%± vs. average
1A	Total Spending	$14,030	4	$18,891	−25.7%
1	Budgetary Cost	8,590	1	14,159	−39.3%
2	Classroom Instruction	4,768	1	8,659	−44.9%
6	Support Services	985	1	2,167	−54.5%
8	Administrative Cost	1,454	29	1,547	−6.0%
10	Operations & Maintenance	1,185	12	1,612	−26.5%
13	Extracurricular Activities	37	9	104	−64.4%
16	Median Teacher Salary	53,175	7	61,136
Data from NJDoE 2014 Taxpayers' Guide to Education Spending. *Of K-8 districts with more than 750 students. Lowest spending=1; Highest=84

The Fairview Public Schools are a community public school district that serves students in pre-kindergarten through eighth grade in Fairview, in Bergen County, in the U.S. state of New Jersey.

As of the 2021–22 school year, the district, comprising three schools, had an enrollment of 1,557 students and 104.5 classroom teachers (on an FTE basis), for a student–teacher ratio of 14.9:1.

The district is classified by the New Jersey Department of Education as being in District Factor Group "A", the lowest of eight groupings. District Factor Groups organize districts statewide to allow comparison by common socioeconomic characteristics of the local districts. From lowest socioeconomic status to highest, the categories are A, B, CD, DE, FG, GH, I and J.

For ninth through twelfth grades, public school students from Fairview attend Cliffside Park High School in Cliffside Park as part of a sending/receiving relationship with the Cliffside Park School District. As of the 2021–22 school year, the high school had an enrollment of 1,192 students and 93.0 classroom teachers (on an FTE basis), for a student–teacher ratio of 12.8:1. The Fairview Board of Education appoints a representative to serve on the Board of the Cliffside Park district.

== Schools ==
Schools in the district (with 2021–22 enrollment data from the National Center for Education Statistics) are:

Elementary schools

- Lincoln School Annex with 253 students in grades PreK-K (opened in October 1997)
  - Veronica Scerbo, principal
- Number 3 School (opened in 1908) / Number Three School Annex with 680 students in grades 1-4
  - Maria Kushi, principal of Number Three School (Grades 2-4)
  - Lucille Juliano, principal of Number Three School Annex (1st Grade)

Middle school

- Lincoln School with 596 students in grades 5-8 (opened in 1911)
  - Betty Puente, principal

== Administration ==
Core members of the district's administration are:

- David Sleppin, superintendent of schools
- John Bussanich, board secretary and business administrator

== Board of education ==
The district's board of education is composed of nine members who set policy and oversee the fiscal and educational operation of the district through its administration. As a Type II school district, the board's trustees are elected directly by voters to serve three-year terms of office on a staggered basis, with three seats up for election each year held in April; the district is one of 12 districts, out of more than 600 statewide, that still hold school elections in April. The board appoints a superintendent to oversee the district's day-to-day operations and a business administrator to supervise the business functions of the district. Of the nearly 600 school districts statewide, Fairview is one of 12 districts with school elections in April, in which voters also decide on passage of the annual school budget.
