= Randi Altschul =

American toy inventor

- Born: Randice-Lisa Altschul; 1960 (age 65–66); Cliffside Park, New Jersey
- Occupation: inventor
- Known for: invention of first disposable cell phone

Randice-Lisa "Randi" Altschul (born 1960) is an American toy developer and inventor based in Cliffside Park, New Jersey. With little technical training or engineering knowledge, she developed toys and board games that saw great success. As a result, she became a millionaire by the age of 26. Her board game Miami Vice, inspired by the television series of the same name, would be further developed into Grand Theft Auto: Vice City by Rockstar North, which went on to become one of the best-selling games in 2002. After her success in the toy industry, Altschul founded Diceland Technologies and invented the first disposable phone. Alschul also co-authored the novel Sorry, You Can't Enter Heaven with Kathleen Sahputis in 2008.

== Early career/toy inventor ==
Altschul's first successes were with toys and games. Her first idea was a 'Miami Vice Game' which built on the success of the American television series of the same name. Other notable toys and games included a Barbie's 30th Birthday Game, and a wearable stuffed toy that could give hugs under the control of the child who was wearing it. She also developed a monster-shaped breakfast cereal which turned soft when covered in milk. Altshul also made money from selling her ideas for board games whose marketing relied on a link with other popular American television series like Teenage Mutant Ninja Turtles and The Simpsons. Altschul became rich and part of the profits were invested in super-thin technology.

Althschul got the idea for the phone when she lost the signal for her conventional mobile phone and resisted the urge to dispose of an expensive phone. She realized that a disposable phone might assist travelers like herself. Altschul created a new company called Diceland Technologies to exploit these technologies to make the phone she planned.

== First disposable cell phone ==
While driving down a highway and talking on her mobile phone one day, she became frustrated with the signal of the phone and wanted to throw the phone out of the window. This moment was in her mind for quite a long time, which eventually pushed her to seek an alternative option to mobile phones. In November 1999, Altschul teamed up with Lee Volte, the Senior Vice President of Research and Development at Tyco, to create the first disposable phone. Their product was called the Phone-Card-Phone because it was the size of a phone card. The phone was less than a quarter-inch thick and was made of materials based on recycled paper. The phone also had a chip on it that allowed the owners to make purchases and use it as a credit card. In essence, this was the first attempt at mobile payment in history. The phone would sell for around $20 and could be used for up to one hour. People who returned the phone after usage would receive a credit of two to three dollars. In 2002, the Phone-Card-Phone was named "Product of the Year" by Frost & Sullivan.

Altschul and her company, Diceland Technologies, envisioned prospective customers of the Phone-Card-Phone as people who were not impressed by the latest technology or women who just wanted to ensure that their sons and daughters would be able to make phone calls to them and their families. Altschul aimed the marketing at those people who would not be interested in a long-term mobile phone contract or tourists who may not usually need a phone but would need one whilst holidaying abroad for the short period of their vacation.
