= Cliffside Park School District =

School district in New Jersey, United States

Address
- 525 Palisade Avenue Cliffside Park, Bergen County, New Jersey, 07010; United States

District information
- Grades: PreK-12
- Superintendent: Michael J. Romagnino
- Business administrator: Louis Alfano
- Schools: 5

Students and staff
- Enrollment: 3,074 (as of 2021–22)
- Faculty: 255.7 FTEs
- Student–teacher ratio: 12.0:1

Other information
- District Factor Group: B
- Website: www.cliffsidepark.edu
Ind.	Per pupil	District spending	Rank (*)	K-12 average	%± vs. average
1A	Total Spending	$15,328	6	$18,891	−18.9%
1	Budgetary Cost	12,567	15	14,783	−15.0%
2	Classroom Instruction	8,162	35	8,763	−6.9%
6	Support Services	1,691	9	2,392	−29.3%
8	Administrative Cost	1,400	20	1,485	−5.7%
10	Operations & Maintenance	952	1	1,783	−46.6%
13	Extracurricular Activities	290	10	268	8.2%
16	Median Teacher Salary	69,000	56	64,043
Data from NJDoE 2014 Taxpayers' Guide to Education Spending. *Of K-12 districts with 1,800-3,500 students. Lowest spending=1; Highest=68

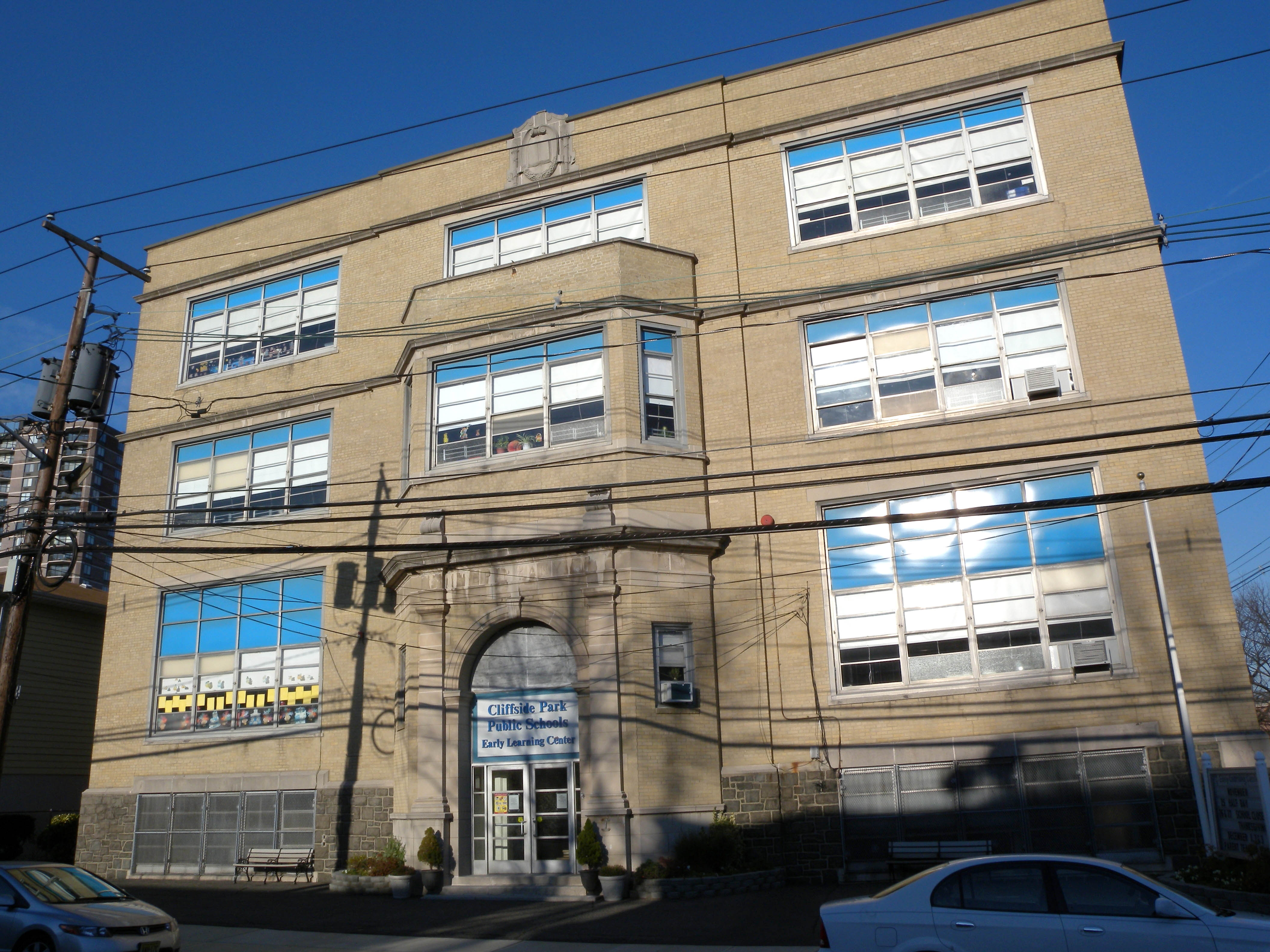
Early Learning Center

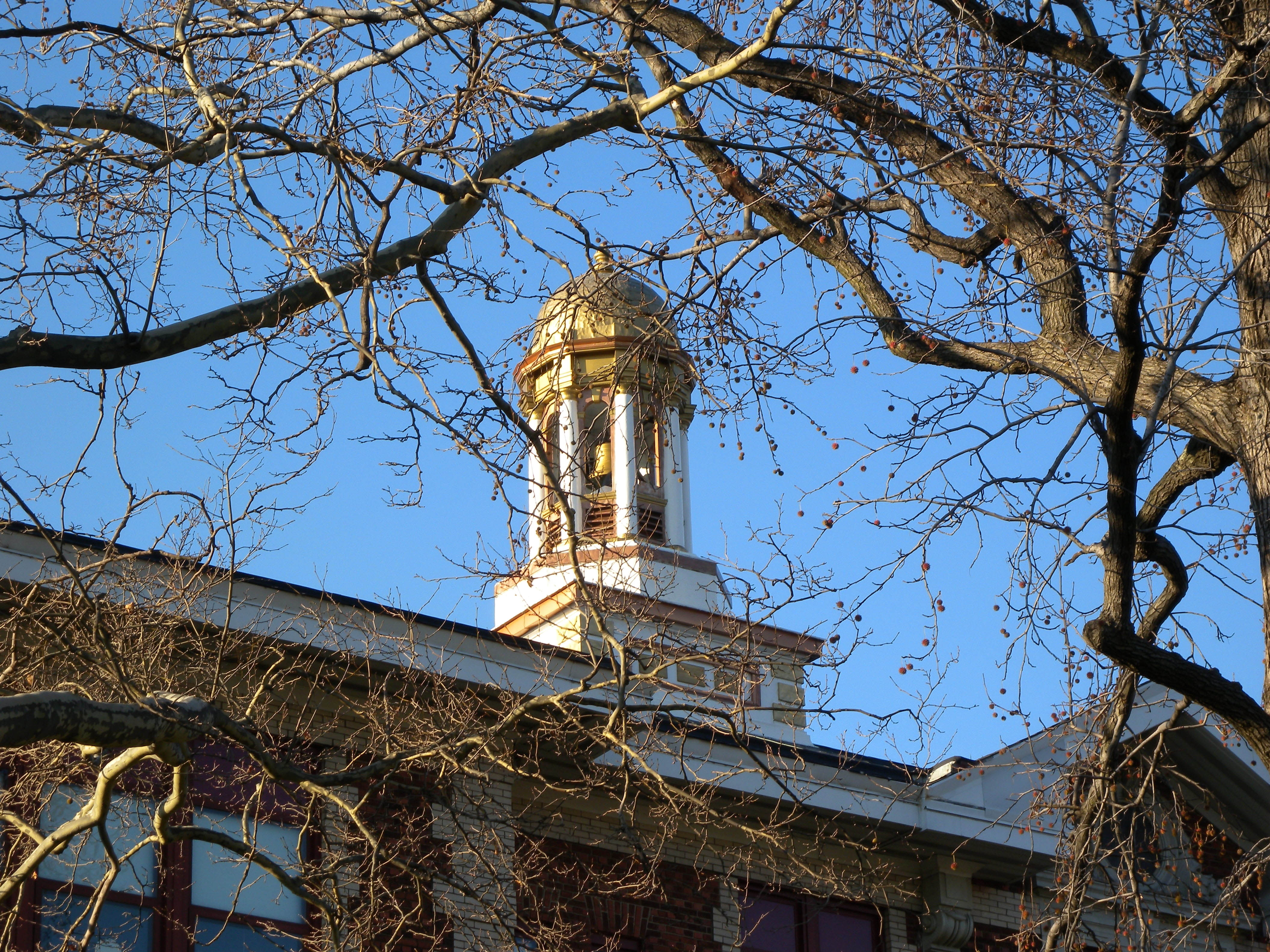
School #3 cupola

The Cliffside Park School District is a comprehensive community public school district that serves students in pre-kindergarten through twelfth grade from Cliffside Park, in Bergen County, in the U.S. state of New Jersey.

As of the 2021–22 school year, the district, comprising five schools, had an enrollment of 3,074 students and 255.7 classroom teachers (on an FTE basis), for a student–teacher ratio of 12.0:1.

The district is classified by the New Jersey Department of Education as being in District Factor Group "B", the second lowest of eight groupings. District Factor Groups organize districts statewide to allow comparison by common socioeconomic characteristics of the local districts. From lowest socioeconomic status to highest, the categories are A, B, CD, DE, FG, GH, I and J.

Students from Fairview attend the district's high school as part of a sending/receiving relationship with the Fairview Public Schools.

== Awards and recognition ==
In 2022, the United States Department of Education announced that Number 4 School was named as a National Blue Ribbon School, along with eight other schools in the state and 297 schools nationwide.

== Schools ==
Schools in the district (with 2021–22 enrollment data from the National Center for Education Statistics) are:

Elementary schools

- Number 3 School with 358 students in grades PreK-4
  - Barbara Bracco, principal
- Number 4 School with 485 students in grades K-5
  - Jaclyn Roussos, principal
- Number 5 School with 275 students in grades PreK-4
  - Dana Martinotti, principal
- Number 6 School / Cliffside Park Middle School with 692 students in grades 5-8
  - Robert Bargna, principal
  - Mark Rindfuss, middle school principal
- Cliffside Park High School with 1,192 students in grades 9-12
  - Lawrence Pinto, principal

== Administration ==
Core members of the district's administration are:

- Michael Romagnino, superintendent of schools
- Louis Alfano, business administrator and board secretary

== Board of education ==
The district's board of education is comprised of nine members who set policy and oversee the fiscal and educational operation of the district through its administration; an additional representative is appointed to represent Fairview. As a Type II school district, the board's trustees are elected directly by voters to serve three-year terms of office on a staggered basis, with three seats up for election each year held in April; the district is one of 12 districts, out of more than 600 statewide, that still hold school elections in April. The board appoints a superintendent to oversee the district's day-to-day operations and a business administrator to supervise the business functions of the district. Of the nearly 600 school districts statewide, Cliffside Park is one of 12 districts with school elections in April, in which voters also decide on passage of the annual school budget.
