= Nick Borelli =

American football player (1905–1992)

No. 34
- Position: Back

Personal information
- Born: March 5, 1905; Cliffside Park, New Jersey, U.S.
- Died: December 12, 1992 (aged 87); Cliffside Park, New Jersey, U.S.
- Listed height: 5 ft 10 in (1.78 m)
- Listed weight: 175 lb (79 kg)

Career information
- High school: Cliffside Park (NJ)
- College: Muhlenberg

Career history
- Newark Tornadoes (1930)

Career statistics
- Games played: 10
- Stats at Pro Football Reference

Nickolas Charles Borelli (March 5, 1905 – December 12, 1992) was an American professional football player who spent one season in the National Football League with the Newark Tornadoes in 1930, appearing in 10 games, making six starts.

Borelli was born in Cliffside Park, New Jersey, where he attended Cliffside Park High School.
