= Gerald Calabrese =

American politician

Personal information
- Born: February 4, 1925 Hoboken, New Jersey, U.S.
- Died: April 13, 2015 (aged 90) Cliffside Park, New Jersey, U.S.
- Listed height: 6 ft 1 in (1.85 m)
- Listed weight: 175 lb (79 kg)

Career information
- High school: Cliffside Park (Cliffside Park, New Jersey)
- College: St. John's (1946–1950)
- NBA draft: 1950: 2nd round, 23rd overall pick
- Drafted by: Syracuse Nationals
- Playing career: 1951–1952
- Position: Point guard
- Number: 12, 9, 13

Career history
- 1951–1952: Syracuse Nationals

Career NBA statistics
- Points: 492 (4.7 ppg)
- Rebounds: 149 (1.4 rpg)
- Assists: 148 (1.4 apg)
- Stats at NBA.com
- Stats at Basketball Reference

Gerald Anthony Calabrese (February 4, 1925 – April 13, 2015) was an American politician who served as Mayor of Cliffside Park, New Jersey continuously for 50 years, from 1965 to 2015. He was a member of the Democratic Party. Earlier in life, Calabrese played in the NBA for two seasons with the Syracuse Nationals.

== Biography ==
Calabrese was a graduate of Cliffside Park High School, where he led the school's team to the state basketball championship. After serving in the United States Navy during World War II, he attended St. John's University, where he was chosen for All-American honors. He went on to a professional basketball career with the Syracuse Nationals, predecessor to today's Philadelphia 76ers.

Calabrese was elected to the Cliffside Park Borough Council in 1955, and then became mayor in 1959. He was re-elected as mayor in 1965 and served continuously as the borough's chief executive until his death in 2015. He was elected to the Bergen County Board of Chosen Freeholders in 1975, 1978 and 1982, and was Freeholder Director in 1984. From 1960 until January 1991, Calabrese was employed by the New Jersey Board of Public Utilities, retiring as the director of water and sewage. He also served as chairman of the Bergen County Democratic Organization for multiple years.

As of 2008, Calabrese was the longest-serving mayor in the State of New Jersey. He secured hundreds of thousands of dollars, sometimes millions, every year for the borough of Cliffside Park and one of the longest-serving mayors in the United States.

After 50 continuous years as mayor, Calabrese died on April 13, 2015, at the age of 90. He was succeeded as mayor by his son, Thomas Calabrese.

== Career stats ==
=== NBA ===
==== Regular season ====
Year	Team	GP	MPG	FG%	FT%	RPG	APG	PPG
1950–51	Syracuse	46		.355	.693	1.4	1.4	4.4
1951–52	Syracuse	58	16.2	.344	.709	1.4	1.4	5.0
Career		104	16.2	.348	.702	1.4	1.4	4.7

===== Playoffs =====
Year	Team	GP	MPG	FG%	FT%	RPG	APG	PPG
1952	Syracuse	6	8.8	.417	1.000	1.3	.7	4.0
