= Hispanics and Latinos in Philadelphia =

The Hispanic and Latino population in Philadelphia has seen growth by 27% in the past 10 years and has grown rapidly since the year 2000. As of the 2020 U.S. census, Philadelphia County is 14.86% Latino.

In the 2000 U.S. census Puerto Ricans were Philadelphia's largest Latino group followed by Mexicans. As of the 2022 US Census 1-Year Estimate, Puerto Ricans still make up the largest Latino group, but recent estimates has seen Dominicans, who are now the second-largest Latino group in Philadelphia, as well as rapidly growing populations of Venezuelans, Colombians, Hondurans, Salvadorans, Guatemalans, and Cubans adding to the Latino community.

== Hispanic or Latino by national origin ==
Ancestry by origin (2022)	Number	%
(Puerto Rico) Puerto Ricans	129,483	8.3
(Dominican Republic) Dominicans	46,136	2.9
(Mexico) Mexicans	21,859	1.4
(Colombia) Colombians	10,446	0.7
(Guatemala) Guatemalans	6,487	0.4
(Venezuela) Venezuelans	4,775	0.3
(Nicaragua) Nicaraguans	3,417	0.2
(Cuba) Cubans	3,234	0.2
(El Salvador) Salvadorans	2,942	0.2
(Peru) Peruvians	2,618	0.2

== See also ==
- History of the Puerto Ricans in Philadelphia
- Cuban migration to Philadelphia
