= Julia Scotti =

American stand-up comedian

- Born: 1952 (age 73–74); Fairview, New Jersey, U.S.
- Notable work: Julia Scotti: Funny That Way - documentary; Hello Boy's, I'm Back - comedy album; Primal Cuts - comedy album
- Children: 3

Comedy career
- Years active: 1980–2000, 2011–present
- Medium: Stand-up, film, television
- Genre: Sketch comedy
- Subjects: American culture, aging, everyday life
- Website: www.juliascotti.com

Julia Scotti is an American transgender stand-up comedian. She was a stand-up comedian pre and post-transition, with a period in between when she was a middle school language arts teacher. She returned to her comedy career in 2011 and appeared on the 11th season of America's Got Talent, where she was eliminated in the quarter-finals in episode 18. She continues to travel doing stand-up comedy. She has had a documentary produced about herself called Julia Scotti: Funny that Way. She was also a part Showtime network's More Funny Women of a Certain Age (2020) comedy special. Additionally, she hosts a podcast called Comedy Centric with Cathy Caldwell and has two comedy albums, Hello Boys I'm Back and Primal Cuts.

== Early life ==
Julia Scotti was born in 1952 and was raised by her single Italian mother in Fairview, New Jersey; after her parents divorced, she attended a Catholic elementary school and moved with her family to Cliffside Park. Her early comedic influences include Lou Costello, Bud Abbott, Lenny Bruce, Richard Pryor, Charlie Chaplin, Buster Keaton and Jean Shephard.

== Career ==
Scotti's first gig as a comedian was May 31, 1980, at the Jade Fountain Chinese restaurant in Paramus, New Jersey. She won the title "Funniest person in New Jersey" in a contest hosted by Showtime television, toured with Jerry Seinfeld and Chris Rock, and has been the opening act for Frankie Valli and the Four Seasons, Chicago and Lou Rawls.

She withdrew from comedy after her career stagnated and returned to college to become a teacher. Afterward, she taught 6th grade Language Arts in Freehold Borough, NJ. Scotti's break from comedy lasted from 2000-2011. When she returned, she performed openly as a woman. Her first opportunity was given to her by Mike Kaplan at The Comedy Works in Bristol, Pennsylvania.

In 2013 The Advocate magazine named her one of the "5 Hottest Transgender Comedians". In October 2015 she was invited to a scheduled audition for America's Got Talent. During her audition, after her set, she revealed herself to be transgender to the international audience, which she has said that the producers of the show did not make her do. She reached the quarter-finals of the 11th season before being eliminated. She continues to tour and has since had a documentary made about her life with footage following a 5-year period, called Julia Scotti: Funny that Way. Scotti is also a part of the Showtime Network's comedy special More Funny Women of a Certain Age. She had a cameo appearance in the 2022 film Bros and portrayed a comedian in the 2021 short film Relatable Joy.

== Personal life ==
Scotti came out in 1999 and surgically transitioned when she was 48 (in 2000).

After coming out, Scotti's wife divorced her, and her children also cut ties with her. In 2016, she was reunited with her children.

She has been a resident of the Whiting section of Manchester Township, New Jersey.
