= Cuban migration to Philadelphia =

For the general history of Cuban Migration to the United States, see Cuban immigration to the United States

"In 1870 the number of Cuban immigrants increased to almost 12,000, of which about 4,500 resided in New York City, about 3,000 in New Orleans and 2,000 in Key West. The causes of these movements were both economic and political, which intensified after 1860, when political factors played the predominant role in emigration, as a result of deteriorating relations with the Spanish metropolis."

Philadelphia in the 19th century had one of the lower immigration rates on the east coast when compared to more densely populated cities such as New York or Tampa. "Philadelphia reached its peak of 27 percent foreign born in 1870" and a portion of these immigrants were Cubans.

== Background ==
Starting as early as 1848 Cuban Immigrants came to the U.S. to escape the changing social and political landscape of their home island. The Spanish Empire, which laid claim to Cuba in 1492, began imposing new policies on the Cuban government that prevented Cubans from taking any positions in government. Spain's goal was to reassert their dominance over Cuba through political pressure and the imprisonment of any Cubans who would rebel against them. Following this string of stringent ordinances war broke out for Cuban independence in 1868 with the beginning of the Ten Years' War.

== Economic Factors ==
During the late 19th century many Cubans had left their home to find better opportunities and to support their families through finding work in the U.S.. A large portion of these Cubans found work in the cigar industry all along the east coast of the United States. Philadelphia was one of the primary cities along the east coast that Cuban migrants would move to due to the large factories that offered many employment opportunities.

Companies like the Bayuk Brothers/Co, now known today as Phillies (cigar), was the largest manufacturer of cigars in Philadelphia and as a result brought on many migrant workers under their employment. In the 1880s most employees at cigar factories like Bayuk were middle class Cubans who had little experience in actual cigar manufacturing to begin with rather than refugees that arrived to the U.S. with very little. Some of these workers would actually go on to use their acquired skills and knowledge to open their own cigar stores later in their career.

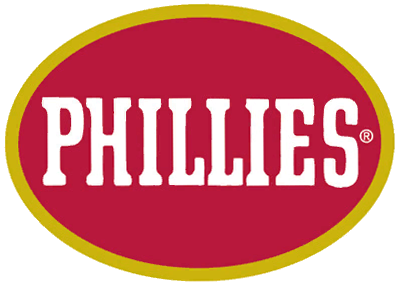
Phillies cigars Current logo

"The history of the cigar-making Bayuk brothers begins in 1896 when Sam, Max and Meyer Bayuk pooled $325 and opened their first factory in a rented Philadelphia attic, joining 900 or so other Philadelphia cigar makers. Their first cigar brand, PRINCESS BONNIE, sold well enough they were able to opened a second factory in Lancaster county, PA. In 1910, they introduced PHILADELPHIA HAND MADE PERFECTO, which the smoking public quickly adopted, shortening the name to “Phillies.” In 1912, the Bayuk Bros. Cigar Co. moved to larger headquarters in Philadelphia while operating small factories in Allentown, Steelton and Bethlehem in PA, Newark and Perth Amboy in NJ as well as one in Binghamton, NY.

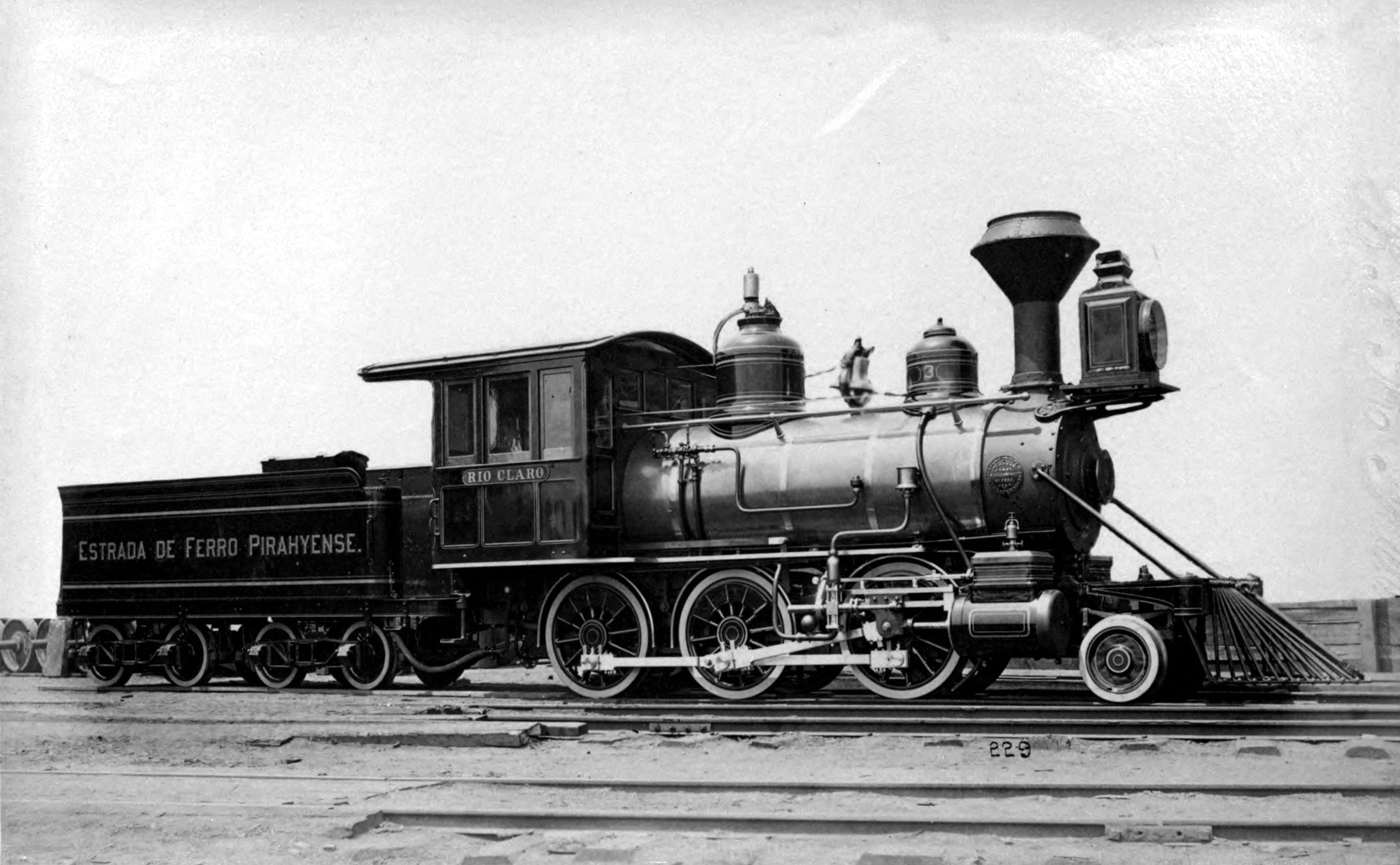
Baldwin Narrow-Gauge Freight Locomotive, Mogul Type (1885), used to transport wood for paper production and coal for factory use.

An economic shift occurred during the 1890s that resulted in the immigration of poorer laborers rather than the previously moderately well-off middle class of Cubans that came before. This was primarily a result of the Cuban War of Independence. This caused many of the unskilled workers who arrived on the shores of the U.S. to become factory workers in larger scale operations. Another industry that Cubans worked in predominately was the steam engine and locomotive industry. Baldwin Locomotive Works, one of the major forces in the industry, employed many Cubans as well as other groups of Latinos.

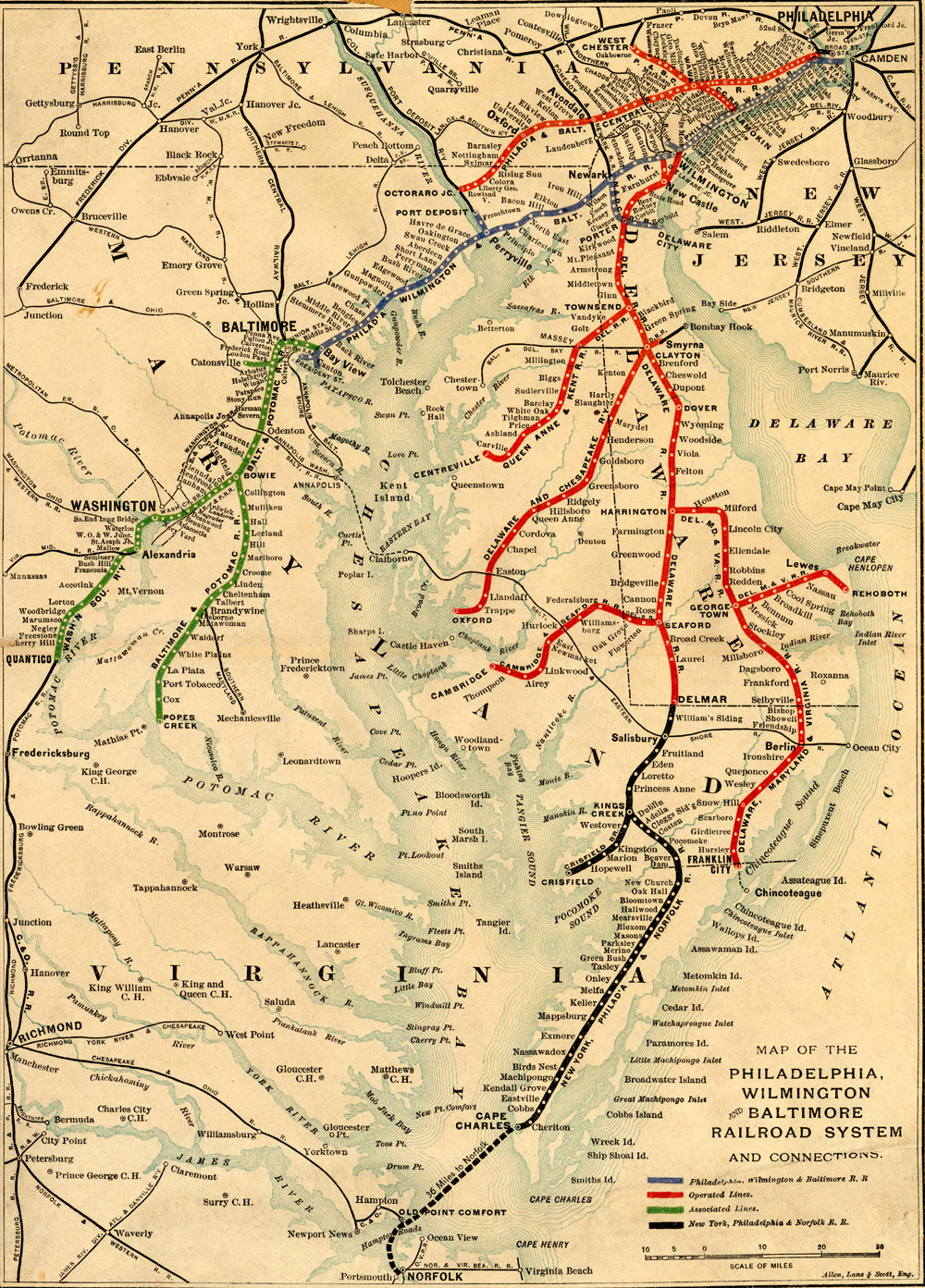
Philadelphia 1890

== Social Organization ==
A majority of Spanish-speaking individuals were drawn to Southwark, Philadelphia as other minority groups had made this area of the city their home. The large congregation of Cuban and Hispanic immigrants led to the development of two organizations of note.

The first was the Spanish American Fraternal Benevolent Association in 1908, also known as La Fraternal, "which was the city's first Spanish speaking mutual aid society". The second was the first Spanish-speaking Catholic mission in Philadelphia known as Our Lady of the Miraculous Medal or La Milagrosa which was established by Vincentian priests from Barcelona. As the Spanish who held Cuban for centuries was Catholic so were a majority of their colonies, including Cuba, and the establishment of a Hispanic church was of great significance to the Cuban immigrants in the U.S.. The church was purchased by Vincentian priests in 1912 with the assistance from Katharine Drexel, "the founder of an order of nuns called the Sisters of the Blessed Sacrament for Indians and Colored People", and was opened with the intent of giving accessibility to Spanish speakers. Drexel, a nun of the Church, also made two conditions that the church must follow in order to receive her financial support which were "services could not be refused to Spanish-speaking Indians or colored people"

As many Cubans were employed by cigar companies at the same time, many unions that focused on the working rights of Spanish-speaking people would be created. In 1877 the first Spanish-speaking union was established in Philadelphia by cigar makers.

== Political Movements ==
As Cuba moved for independence from the Spanish Empire in 1895 they would receive support from the United States. Many migrant Cubans would join the Cuba Libre movement in the early 1890s and primarily consisted of cigar workers throughout Philadelphia and the rest of the east coast.

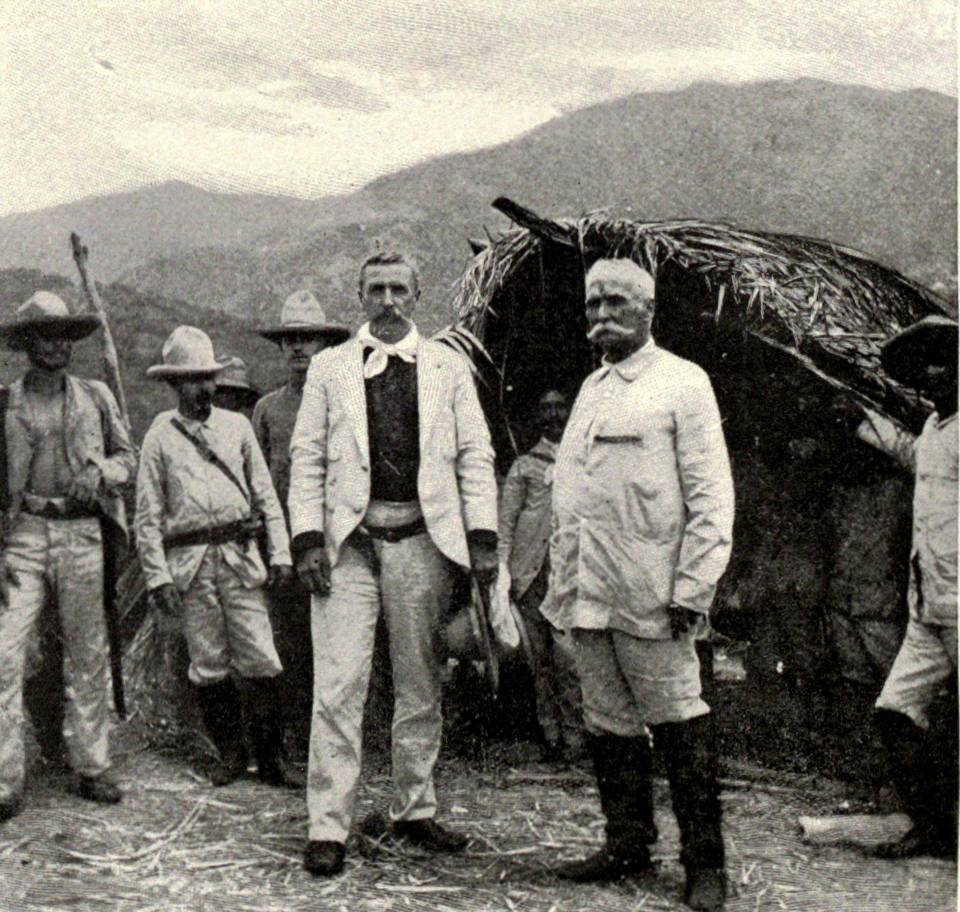
General Calixto Garcia (right center) and Brig. General William Ludlow (left center), taken during their conference at the time of the landing of the American army, from p. 312 of Harper's Pictorial History of the War with Spain, Vol. II, published by Harper and Brothers in 1899.

Philadelphia was also the third largest supporter of the Cuban independence movement behind Tampa and New York until 1898. In the aftermath of the Spanish–American War the Cuban Revolutionary Party was disbanded and many of its members remained in Philadelphia and continued to lead other Spanish speakers in many social movements in the following years.

Throughout the mid to late 19th century many Spanish speaking papers were released that proclaimed a strong support for the Cuban independence movement. These included El Eco de Cuba (1850's), El Cubano (1850's), Le Voce de America (1860's) and many others along the East coast.

== Notes and references ==
While this particular field of immigration history is relatively underdeveloped compared to the following mass migration from Cuba in the 1960s there is still research being done to expand this point in America's history.
