= Fairview, New Jersey =

Borough in Bergen County, New Jersey, US

- Borough
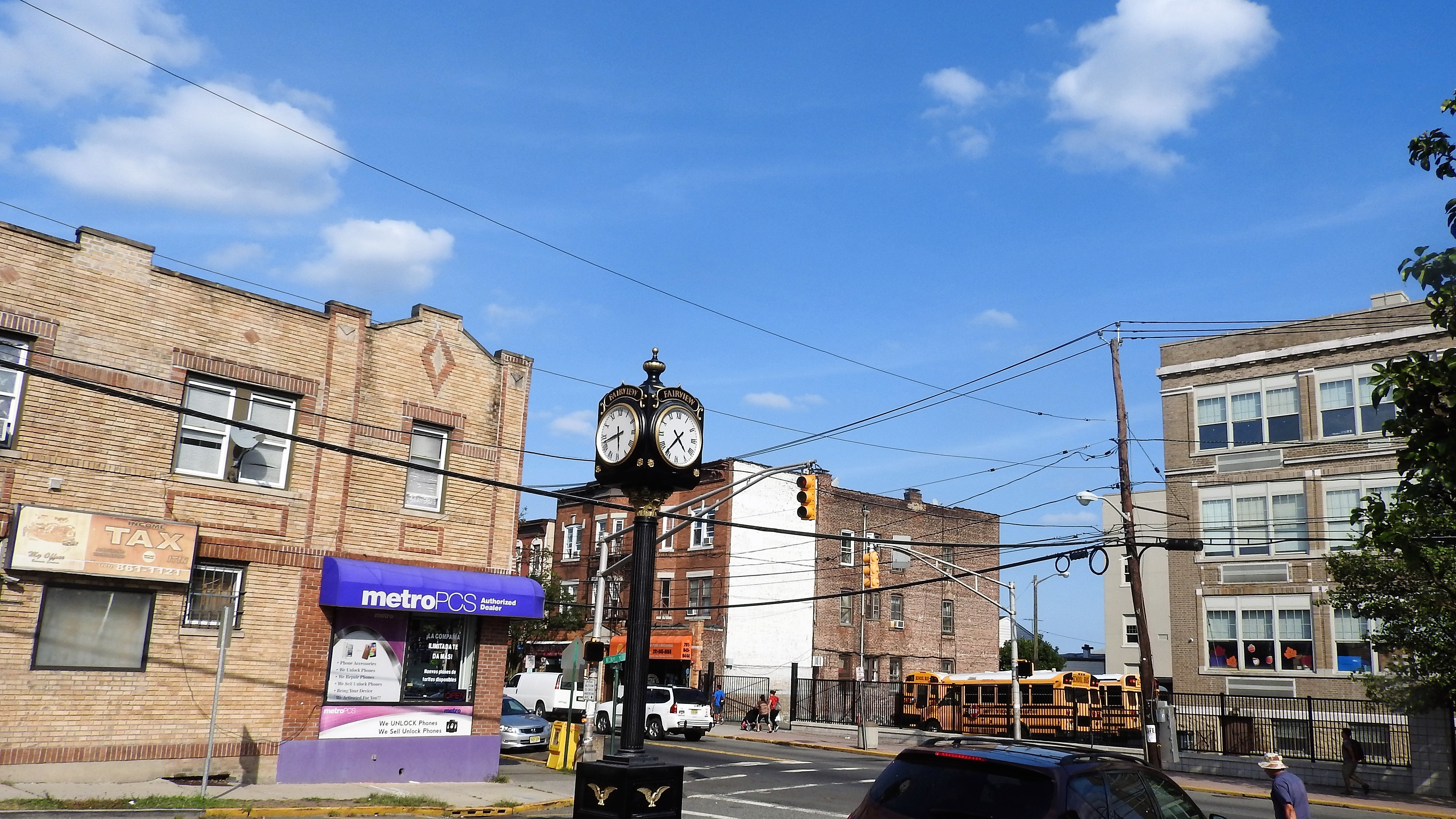
- Downtown Fairview

- Seal

- Location of Fairview in Bergen County highlighted in red (left). Inset map: Location of Bergen County in New Jersey highlighted in orange (right).

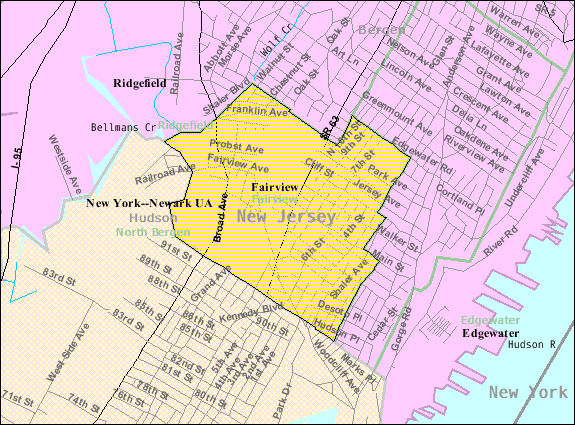
- Census Bureau map of Fairview, New Jersey

- Location in Bergen County Location in New Jersey Location in the United States
- Coordinates: 40.82111°N 74.003032°W
- Country: United States
- State: New Jersey
- County: Bergen
- Incorporated: December 19, 1894

Government
  - Type: Borough
  - Body: Borough Council
  - Mayor: Violeta Berisha (D, term ends December 31, 2027)
  - Administrator / Municipal clerk: Diane T. Testa

Area
  - Total: 0.85 sq mi (2.19 km^{2})
  - Land: 0.85 sq mi (2.19 km^{2})
  - Water: 0 sq mi (0.00 km^{2}) 0.24%
  - Rank: 520th of 565 in state 68th of 70 in county
- Elevation: 259 ft (79 m)

Population (2020)
  - Total: 15,025
  - Estimate (2023): 14,927
  - Rank: 176th of 565 in state 22nd of 70 in county
  - Density: 17,802.1/sq mi (6,873.4/km^{2})
  - Rank: 12th of 565 in state 2nd of 70 in county
- Time zone: UTC−05:00 (Eastern (EST))
  - Summer (DST): UTC−04:00 (Eastern (EDT))
- ZIP Code: 07022
- Area code: 201
- FIPS code: 3400322560
- GNIS feature ID: 0885215
- Website: www.fairviewborough.com

Fairview is a borough located in Bergen County, in the U.S. state of New Jersey. According to the 2020 United States census, the borough's population was 15,025, an increase of 1,190 (+8.6%) from the 2010 census count of 13,835, which in turn reflected an increase of 580 (+4.4%) from the 13,255 counted in the 2000 census.

Fairview was formed on December 19, 1894, from portions of Ridgefield Township, based on the results of a referendum held the previous day. The borough was formed during the "Boroughitis" phenomenon then sweeping through Bergen County, in which 26 boroughs were formed in the county in 1894 alone. The borough is named for its view of the Hackensack River valley.

== Geography ==
According to the United States Census Bureau, the borough had a total area of 0.85 square miles (2.19 km^{2}), including 0.84 square miles (2.19 km^{2}) of land and <0.01 square miles (<0.01 km^{2}) of water (0.24%).

The borough borders the municipalities of Cliffside Park and Ridgefield in Bergen County; and North Bergen in Hudson County.

Fairview Cemetery and Mount Moriah Cemetery are located along the western slope of the Hudson Palisades.

== Demographics ==
Historical population
| Census | Pop. | Note | %± |
|---|---|---|---|
| 1900 | 1,003 | | — |
| 1910 | 2,441 | | 143.4% |
| 1920 | 4,882 | | 100.0% |
| 1930 | 9,067 | | 85.7% |
| 1940 | 8,770 | | −3.3% |
| 1950 | 8,661 | | −1.2% |
| 1960 | 9,399 | | 8.5% |
| 1970 | 10,698 | | 13.8% |
| 1980 | 10,519 | | −1.7% |
| 1990 | 10,733 | | 2.0% |
| 2000 | 13,255 | | 23.5% |
| 2010 | 13,835 | | 4.4% |
| 2020 | 15,025 | | 8.6% |
| 2023 (est.) | 14,927 | ▼ | −0.7% |
Population sources: 1900–1920 1900–1910; 1910–1930 1900–2020; 2000 2010 2020

=== Racial and ethnic composition ===
Fairview borough, Bergen County, New Jersey – Racial and ethnic composition Note: the US Census treats Hispanic/Latino as an ethnic category. This table excludes Latinos from the racial categories and assigns them to a separate category. Hispanics/Latinos may be of any race.
| Race / Ethnicity (NH = Non-Hispanic) | Pop 2000 | Pop 2010 | Pop 2020 | % 2000 | % 2010 | % 2020 |
|---|---|---|---|---|---|---|
| White alone (NH) | 6,872 | 4,945 | 3,513 | 51.84% | 35.74% | 23.38% |
| Black or African American alone (NH) | 161 | 286 | 240 | 1.21% | 2.07% | 1.60% |
| Native American or Alaska Native alone (NH) | 20 | 22 | 27 | 0.15% | 0.16% | 0.18% |
| Asian alone (NH) | 656 | 612 | 694 | 4.95% | 4.42% | 4.62% |
| Native Hawaiian or Pacific Islander alone (NH) | 4 | 0 | 0 | 0.03% | 0.00% | 0.00% |
| Other race alone (NH) | 108 | 193 | 238 | 0.81% | 1.40% | 1.58% |
| Mixed race or Multiracial (NH) | 523 | 219 | 295 | 3.95% | 1.58% | 1.96% |
| Hispanic or Latino (any race) | 4,911 | 7,558 | 10,018 | 37.05% | 54.63% | 66.68% |
| Total | 13,255 | 13,835 | 15,025 | 100.00% | 100.00% | 100.00% |

=== 2020 census ===
As of the 2020 census, Fairview had a population of 15,025. The median age was 35.3 years. 22.2% of residents were under the age of 18 and 12.1% of residents were 65 years of age or older. For every 100 females there were 102.7 males, and for every 100 females age 18 and over there were 102.7 males age 18 and over.

100.0% of residents lived in urban areas, while 0.0% lived in rural areas.

There were 5,021 households in Fairview, of which 36.6% had children under the age of 18 living in them. Of all households, 42.9% were married-couple households, 20.5% were households with a male householder and no spouse or partner present, and 29.0% were households with a female householder and no spouse or partner present. About 22.0% of all households were made up of individuals and 9.9% had someone living alone who was 65 years of age or older.

There were 5,291 housing units, of which 5.1% were vacant. The homeowner vacancy rate was 1.2% and the rental vacancy rate was 3.2%.

=== 2010 census ===
The 2010 United States census counted 13,835 people, 4,853 households, and 3,256 families in the borough. The population density was 16,421.8 per square mile (6,340.5/km^{2}). There were 5,150 housing units at an average density of 6,112.9 per square mile (2,360.2/km^{2}). The racial makeup was 66.40% (9,186) White, 2.94% (407) Black or African American, 0.66% (92) Native American, 4.63% (640) Asian, 0.03% (4) Pacific Islander, 19.66% (2,720) from other races, and 5.68% (786) from two or more races. Hispanic or Latino of any race were 54.63% (7,558) of the population. The city's Hispanic population was the 12th-highest percentage among municipalities in New Jersey as of the 2010 Census.

Of the 4,853 households, 28.8% had children under the age of 18; 42.7% were married couples living together; 14.2% had a female householder with no husband present and 32.9% were non-families. Of all households, 26.0% were made up of individuals and 11.0% had someone living alone who was 65 years of age or older. The average household size was 2.85 and the average family size was 3.34.

19.6% of the population were under the age of 18, 11.8% from 18 to 24, 33.6% from 25 to 44, 23.1% from 45 to 64, and 12.0% who were 65 years of age or older. The median age was 34.6 years. For every 100 females, the population had 111.3 males. For every 100 females ages 18 and older there were 114.2 males.

The Census Bureau's 2006–2010 American Community Survey showed that (in 2010 inflation-adjusted dollars) median household income was $43,341 (with a margin of error of +/− $5,441) and the median family income was $53,285 (+/− $6,982). Males had a median income of $36,241 (+/− $8,067) versus $32,069 (+/− $7,902) for females. The per capita income for the borough was $22,477 (+/− $1,520). About 11.4% of families and 15.0% of the population were below the poverty line, including 17.2% of those under age 18 and 18.7% of those age 65 or over.

=== 2000 census ===
As of the 2000 United States census there were 13,255 people, 4,861 households, and 3,179 families residing in the borough. The population density was 15,585.5 inhabitants per square mile (6,017.6/km^{2}). There were 4,988 housing units at an average density of 5,865.0 per square mile (2,264.5/km^{2}). The racial makeup of the borough was 72.46% White, 1.71% African American, 0.38% Native American, 4.97% Asian, 0.03% Pacific Islander, 12.92% from other races, and 7.53% from two or more races. 37.05% of the population were Hispanic or Latino of any race.

As of the 2000 Census, 4.6% of Fairview's residents identified themselves as being of Croatian ancestry. This was the 16th-highest percentage in the United States and the highest percentage of people with Croatian ancestry in any place in New Jersey with 1,000 or more residents identifying their ancestry. In the same census, 2.4% of Fairview's residents identified themselves as being of Armenian American ancestry, the 18th highest percentage of Armenian American people in any place in the United States with 1,000 or more residents identifying their ancestry. As of the 2000 Census, 1.9% of residents identified themselves as being of Turkish American ancestry, the third-highest of any municipality in the United States and second-highest in the state.

There were 4,861 households, out of which 30.0% had children under the age of 18 living with them, 47.3% were married couples living together, 11.5% had a female householder with no husband present, and 34.6% were non-families. 28.0% of all households were made up of individuals, and 11.8% had someone living alone who was 65 years of age or older. The average household size was 2.73 and the average family size was 3.31.

In the borough the population was spread out, with 21.1% under the age of 18, 11.5% from 18 to 24, 34.6% from 25 to 44, 19.0% from 45 to 64, and 13.8% who were 65 years of age or older. The median age was 34 years. For every 100 females, there were 106.8 males. For every 100 females age 18 and over, there were 105.7 males.

The median income for a household in the borough was $40,393, and the median income for a family was $46,365. Males had a median income of $35,000 compared to $29,905 for females. The per capita income for the borough was $18,835. 11.8% of the population and 9.3% of families were below the poverty line. Out of the total population, 14.2% of those under the age of 18 and 8.7% of those 65 and older were living below the poverty line.

== Government ==
=== Local government ===
Fairview is governed under the borough form of New Jersey municipal government, which is used in 218 municipalities (of the 564) statewide, making it the most common form of government in New Jersey. The governing body consists of a mayor and a borough council, all of whom are elected on a partisan basis in the November general election. A mayor is elected directly by the voters to a four-year term of office. The borough council is comprised of six members elected to serve three-year terms on a staggered basis, with two seats coming up for election each year in a three-year cycle. The form of government used by Fairview is a "weak mayor / strong council" type, where council members serves as the legislative body, while the mayor presides over meetings and only casts a vote in case of a tie. The mayor can veto ordinances subject to an override by a two-thirds majority vote of the council. The mayor makes committee and liaison assignments for council members, and most appointments are made by the mayor with the advice and consent of the council.

As of 2024, the mayor of Fairview is Democrat Violeta Berisha, whose term of office ends December 31, 2027. Berisha, the first female mayor in the borough's history, ran unopposed to succeed Vincent A. Bellucci Jr., the longest-serving mayor in Fairview's history, who had served as mayor for 27 years. Members of the Fairview Borough Council are Florencia Irma Asto (D, 2024; elected to serve an unexpired term), Stephen Burke (D, 2026), Jhon Gomez (D, 2024), Albert Lukin (D, 2026), Russell Martin (D, 2025) and Stephen J. Russo (D, 2024).

In May 2017, the borough council selected Violetta Berisha to fill the seat expiring December 2019 that became vacant following the resignation of John Rossi. Berisha served on an interim basis until the November 2017 general election, when she was elected to serve the balance of the term of office.

Russell Martin was named in January 2012 to fill the council vacancy of the seat that had been held by John Pierotti following his death, and won the remainder of the term the 2012 general election, running unopposed for the seat.

=== Federal, state, and county representation ===
Fairview is located in the 9th Congressional District and is part of New Jersey's 36th state legislative district.

For the 119th United States Congress, New Jersey's 9th congressional district is represented by Nellie Pou (D, North Haledon) New Jersey is represented in the United States Senate by Democrats Cory Booker (Newark, term ends 2027) and Andy Kim (Moorestown, term ends 2031).

For the 2026–2027 session, the 36th legislative district of the New Jersey Legislature is represented in the State Senate by Paul Sarlo (D, Wood-Ridge) and in the General Assembly by Clinton Calabrese (D, Cliffside Park) and Gary Schaer (D, Passaic).

Bergen County is governed by a directly elected County Executive, with legislative functions performed by a Board of County Commissioners comprised of seven members who are elected at-large to three-year terms in partisan elections on a staggered basis, with either two or three seats coming up for election each November; a Chairman and Vice Chairman are selected from among its seven members at a reorganization meeting held every January. As of 2025, the county executive is James J. Tedesco III (D, Paramus), whose four-year term of office ends December 31, 2026.

Bergen County's Commissioners are Chair Mary J. Amoroso (D, Mahwah, 2025), Vice Chair Steven A. Tanelli (D, North Arlington, 2027), Chair Pro Tem Joan Voss (D, Fort Lee, 2026), Rafael Marte (D, Bergenfield, 2026), Germaine M. Ortiz (D, Emerson, 2025), Thomas J. Sullivan Jr. (D, Montvale, 2025) and Tracy Silna Zur (D, Franklin Lakes, 2027).

Bergen County's elected constitutional officials are Clerk John S. Hogan (D, Northvale, 2026), Sheriff Anthony Cureton (D, Englewood, 2027) and Surrogate Michael R. Dressler (D, Cresskill, 2026).

=== Politics ===
As of March 2011, there were a total of 4,945 registered voters in Fairview, of which 2,374 (48.0% vs. 31.7% countywide) were registered as Democrats, 487 (9.8% vs. 21.1%) were registered as Republicans and 2,082 (42.1% vs. 47.1%) were registered as Unaffiliated. There were 2 voters registered as Libertarians or Greens. Among the borough's 2010 census population, 35.7% (vs. 57.1% in Bergen County) were registered to vote, including 44.4% of those ages 18 and over (vs. 73.7% countywide).

Gubernatorial election results for Fairview
| Year | Republican | | Democratic | | Third party(ies) | |
| Year | No. | % | No. | % | No. | % |
|---|---|---|---|---|---|---|
| 2025 | 728 | 31.57% | 1,565 | 67.87% | 13 | 0.56% |
| 2021 | 685 | 37.35% | 1,141 | 62.21% | 8 | 0.44% |
| 2017 | 381 | 22.95% | 1,256 | 75.66% | 23 | 1.39% |
| 2013 | 767 | 43.46% | 976 | 55.30% | 22 | 1.25% |
| 2009 | 690 | 30.71% | 1,455 | 64.75% | 102 | 4.54% |
| 2005 | 607 | 26.27% | 1,627 | 70.40% | 77 | 3.33% |

In the 2012 presidential election, Democrat Barack Obama received 2,549 votes (71.6% vs. 54.8% countywide), ahead of Republican Mitt Romney with 944 votes (26.5% vs. 43.5%) and other candidates with 27 votes (0.8% vs. 0.9%), among the 3,562 ballots cast by the borough's 5,456 registered voters, for a turnout of 65.3% (vs. 70.4% in Bergen County). In the 2008 presidential election, Democrat Barack Obama received 2,608 votes (66.9% vs. 53.9% countywide), ahead of Republican John McCain with 1,193 votes (30.6% vs. 44.5%) and other candidates with 36 votes (0.9% vs. 0.8%), among the 3,899 ballots cast by the borough's 5,703 registered voters, for a turnout of 68.4% (vs. 76.8% in Bergen County). In the 2004 presidential election, Democrat John Kerry received 2,262 votes (62.9% vs. 51.7% countywide), ahead of Republican George W. Bush with 1,296 votes (36.0% vs. 47.2%) and other candidates with 21 votes (0.6% vs. 0.7%), among the 3,599 ballots cast by the borough's 5,661 registered voters, for a turnout of 63.6% (vs. 76.9% in the whole county).

Presidential elections results
| Year | Republican | Democratic |
|---|---|---|
| 2024 | 49.7% 1,716 | 45.1% 1,556 |
| 2020 | 38.3% 1,467 | 60.5% 2,321 |
| 2016 | 32.1% 1,142 | 65.1% 2,312 |
| 2012 | 26.5% 944 | 71.6 2,549 |
| 2008 | 30.6% 1,193 | 66.9% 2,608 |
| 2004 | 36.0% 1,296 | 62.9% 2,262 |

In the 2013 gubernatorial election, Democrat Barbara Buono received 55.3% of the vote (976 cast), ahead of Republican Chris Christie with 43.5% (767 votes), and other candidates with 1.2% (22 votes), among the 1,862 ballots cast by the borough's 5,088 registered voters (97 ballots were spoiled), for a turnout of 36.6%. In the 2009 gubernatorial election, Democrat Jon Corzine received 1,445 ballots cast (63.7% vs. 48.0% countywide), ahead of Republican Chris Christie with 690 votes (30.4% vs. 45.8%), Independent Chris Daggett with 85 votes (3.7% vs. 4.7%) and other candidates with 17 votes (0.7% vs. 0.5%), among the 2,268 ballots cast by the borough's 5,356 registered voters, yielding a 42.3% turnout (vs. 50.0% in the county).

United States Senate election results for Fairview1
| Year | Republican | | Democratic | | Third party(ies) | |
| Year | No. | % | No. | % | No. | % |
|---|---|---|---|---|---|---|
| 2024 | 1,385 | 44.62% | 1,553 | 50.03% | 166 | 5.35% |
| 2018 | 690 | 27.77% | 1,733 | 69.74% | 62 | 2.49% |
| 2012 | 737 | 22.90% | 2,442 | 75.89% | 39 | 1.21% |
| 2006 | 685 | 27.02% | 1,812 | 71.48% | 38 | 1.50% |

United States Senate election results for Fairview2
| Year | Republican | | Democratic | | Third party(ies) | |
| Year | No. | % | No. | % | No. | % |
|---|---|---|---|---|---|---|
| 2020 | 1,236 | 33.88% | 2,336 | 64.04% | 76 | 2.08% |
| 2014 | 403 | 23.80% | 1,266 | 74.78% | 24 | 1.42% |
| 2013 | 279 | 28.70% | 670 | 68.93% | 23 | 2.37% |
| 2008 | 883 | 26.39% | 2,425 | 72.47% | 38 | 1.14% |

== Education ==
The Fairview Public Schools serve students in pre-kindergarten through eighth grade. As of the 2021–22 school year, the district, comprised of three schools, had an enrollment of 1,557 students and 104.5 classroom teachers (on an FTE basis), for a student–teacher ratio of 14.9:1. Schools in the district (with 2021–22 enrollment data from the National Center for Education Statistics) are Lincoln School Annex with 253 students in grades PreK-K, Number 3 School / Number Three School Annex with 680 students in grades 1-4 and Lincoln School with 596 students in grades 5-8.

For ninth through twelfth grades, public school students from Fairview attend Cliffside Park High School in Cliffside Park as part of a sending/receiving relationship with the Cliffside Park School District. As of the 2021–22 school year, the high school had an enrollment of 1,192 students and 93.0 classroom teachers (on an FTE basis), for a student–teacher ratio of 12.8:1. The Fairview Board of Education appoints a representative to serve on the Board of the Cliffside Park district.

Public school students from the borough, and all of Bergen County, are eligible to attend the secondary education programs offered by the Bergen County Technical Schools, which include the Bergen County Academies in Hackensack, and the Bergen Tech campus in Teterboro or Paramus. The district offers programs on a shared-time or full-time basis, with admission based on a selective application process and tuition covered by the student's home school district.

== Transportation ==
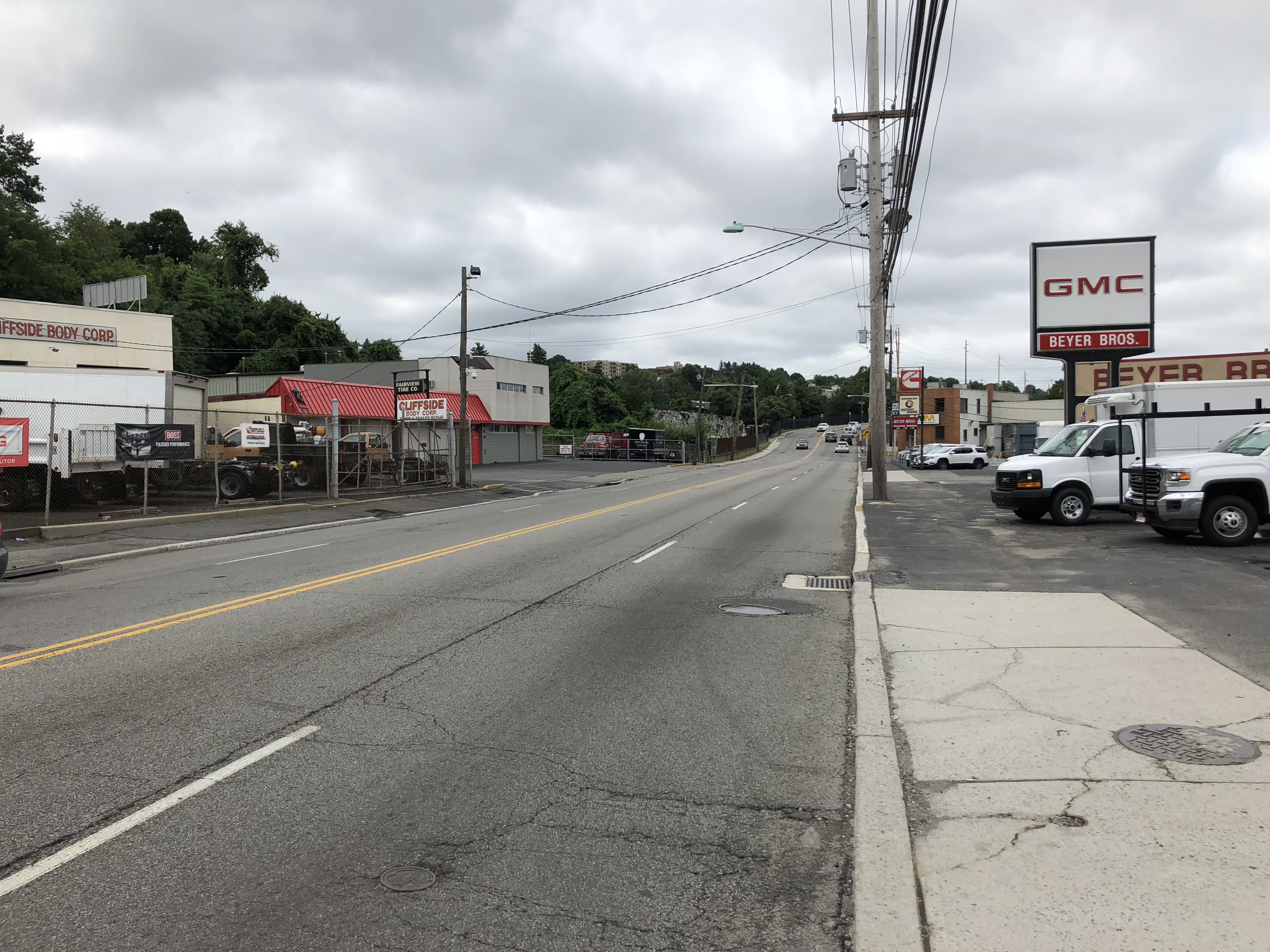
View south along U.S. Route 1/9 in Fairview

=== Roads and highways ===
As of May 2010, the borough had a total of 17.16 miles (27.62 km) of roadways, of which 13.48 miles (21.69 km) were maintained by the municipality, 2.13 miles (3.43 km) by Bergen County and 1.55 miles (2.49 km) by the New Jersey Department of Transportation.

U.S. Route 1/9, Route 63 and County Route 501 travel through Fairview, with the southern terminus of Route 63 at Fairview.

=== Public transportation ===
Fairview is served by NJ Transit bus routes 127, 128, 154, 156, 159, 165, 166 and 168, which provide service to and from the Port Authority Bus Terminal in Midtown Manhattan; the 181 to the George Washington Bridge Bus Terminal; the 83 to Jersey City; and local service on the 751 and 755 routes. Many of these routes converge at the border with Hudson County at Nungessers.

The privately owned FT 9X operates between Nungesser's (at 90th Street and Bergenline Avenue) in North Bergen, Hudson County to the GWB Bus Terminal via Palisade Avenue; this last route passes through Fairview for one block between Hamilton Avenue / Woodcliff Avenue to Anderson Avenue / Woodcliff Avenue.

NJ Transit plans to extend the Hudson–Bergen Light Rail through Fairview as part of the Northern Branch Corridor Project, which would run along the Northern Branch right-of-way. The plans include a stop near the county line in North Bergen at 91st Street.

== Notable people ==
People who were born in, residents of, or otherwise closely associated with Fairview include:

- Kyle Anderson (born 1993), UCLA Bruins basketball player who was selected in the first round of the 2014 NBA draft by the San Antonio Spurs
- Simon Douglas (1843–1950), former slave who lived to become the last Civil War soldier in the state of New Jersey
- Vicki Genfan (born 1959), fingerstyle guitarist, composer and singer
- Hadi Matar (born c. 1997), alleged attacker of Salman Rushdie
- Caitlin Sanchez (born 1996), actress known as the voice of Dora on Dora the Explorer
- John Scarne (1903–1985), author, expert on gambling, card games and magic tricks
- Julia Scotti, transgender stand-up comedian

== See also ==
- Havana on the Hudson
- USS Fairview

== Sources ==
- Municipal Incorporations of the State of New Jersey (according to Counties) prepared by the Division of Local Government, Department of the Treasury (New Jersey); December 1, 1958.
- Clayton, W. Woodford; and Nelson, Nelson. History of Bergen and Passaic Counties, New Jersey, with Biographical Sketches of Many of its Pioneers and Prominent Men. Philadelphia: Everts and Peck, 1882.
- Harvey, Cornelius Burnham (ed.), Genealogical History of Hudson and Bergen Counties, New Jersey. New York: New Jersey Genealogical Publishing Co., 1900.
- Van Valen, James M. History of Bergen County, New Jersey. New York: New Jersey Publishing and Engraving Co., 1900.
- Westervelt, Frances A. (Frances Augusta), 1858–1942, History of Bergen County, New Jersey, 1630–1923, Lewis Historical Publishing Company, 1923.
