= Al Día (Philadelphia) =

Spanish-language U.S. newspaper

Al Día News Media
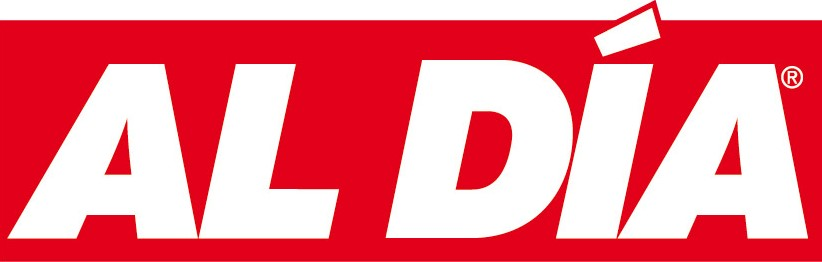
- Type: News media
- Publisher: Hernán Guaracao
- Editor: Hernán Guaracao
- Founded: 1992
- Language: Spanish; English
- Headquarters: 1835 Market Street; Philadelphia
- Website: aldianews.com

Al Día News Media (stylized as AL DÍA) is an American media company based in Philadelphia that produces print and digital news content in Spanish and English. Historically focused on Philadelphia's Spanish-speaking and Latino communities, the newspaper has expanded its reporting to include topics relevant for Latinos nationwide, as well as increased English-language content.

== History ==
Al Día was founded in 1992 by Hernán and Elizabeth Guaracao, who immigrated to the United States from Colombia. It began as a Spanish-language neighborhood paper in North Philadelphia, publishing its first issue as an eight-page newsletter in January 1993. According to the Historical Society of Pennsylvania, Al Día "worked to expand the circulation of Latino-centric news beyond the Spanish-speaking barrios of North Philadelphia to the entire city, a span that continued to grow until it reached into the suburbs of Pennsylvania and New Jersey."

In 2009, Al Día paid $210,000 to former city solicitor Ken Trujillo after losing a libel lawsuit. The paper had run a series of articles in 2006 alleging improprieties in Trujillo's election as chairman of the Greater Philadelphia Hispanic Chamber of Commerce.

As part of a move to attract younger and bilingual readers, Al Día launched an English-language version of its website in 2014 and began publishing original stories in English, as well as translating stories between English and Spanish. By 2016, roughly 80 percent of visits to the Al Día website were to English-language content. In recent years, the paper has focused on digital content and building a nationwide readership in both Spanish and English.

In 2023, Al Día announced the launch of AL DÍA Magazine, a subscription-based digital and print publication in English with news articles, features, and op-eds that cover "the best of the American multicultural experience".

== Activities ==
For the paper's 20th anniversary in 2012, Al Día released 200 Years of Latino History in Philadelphia, a history and photography book documenting the city's Hispanic communities.

In 2015, Al Día hosted a forum for Philadelphia's mayoral candidates. However, the paper did not take any editorial stance on the mayoral election, as part of what owner Hernán Guaracao called "the Latin American tradition of not endorsing candidates".

With funding from the Local Media Association, Al Día launched the Journalism Lab on Higher Education in 2021, a project reporting on "the transformation—and crisis—of America's professional workforce in the 21st century."

Al Día also operates the Al Día Foundation, a nonprofit organization that supports emerging journalists in Philadelphia.

== Business operations ==
Al Día's circulation increased from 43,552 in 2005 to 56,253 in 2008, taking advantage of the recent growth in Philadelphia's Latino population. In 2015, the paper had roughly 20 employees, a circulation of 40,000, and 92,000 unique monthly website visitors. As of 2022, the paper had a full-time staff of 15 employees plus freelancers, an estimated print readership of 100,000 weekly, and 300,000 to 400,000 monthly website visitors.

According to director of business development Martin Alfaro, Al Día is funded largely through advertisements, as well as journalism grants and partnerships with companies such as Comcast. During the COVID-19 pandemic, the company expanded its use of branded content with corporate sponsors.

== Reception ==
The Columbia Journalism Review wrote in 2009 that Al Día was considered Philadelphia's "most reputable Spanish-language paper, with broad coverage of Latin American politics, immigration, and other issues important to Latino readers." In 2013, The Philadelphia Inquirer called the paper "the leading Spanish-English weekly of Southeastern Pennsylvania, South Jersey, and Delaware". In 2023, The Inquirer said that Al Día was Philadelphia's "longest-running and largest bilingual English-Spanish news source."

== See also ==
- Hispanics and Latinos in Philadelphia
