= Cliffside Park, New Jersey =

Borough in Bergen County, New Jersey, US

- Borough
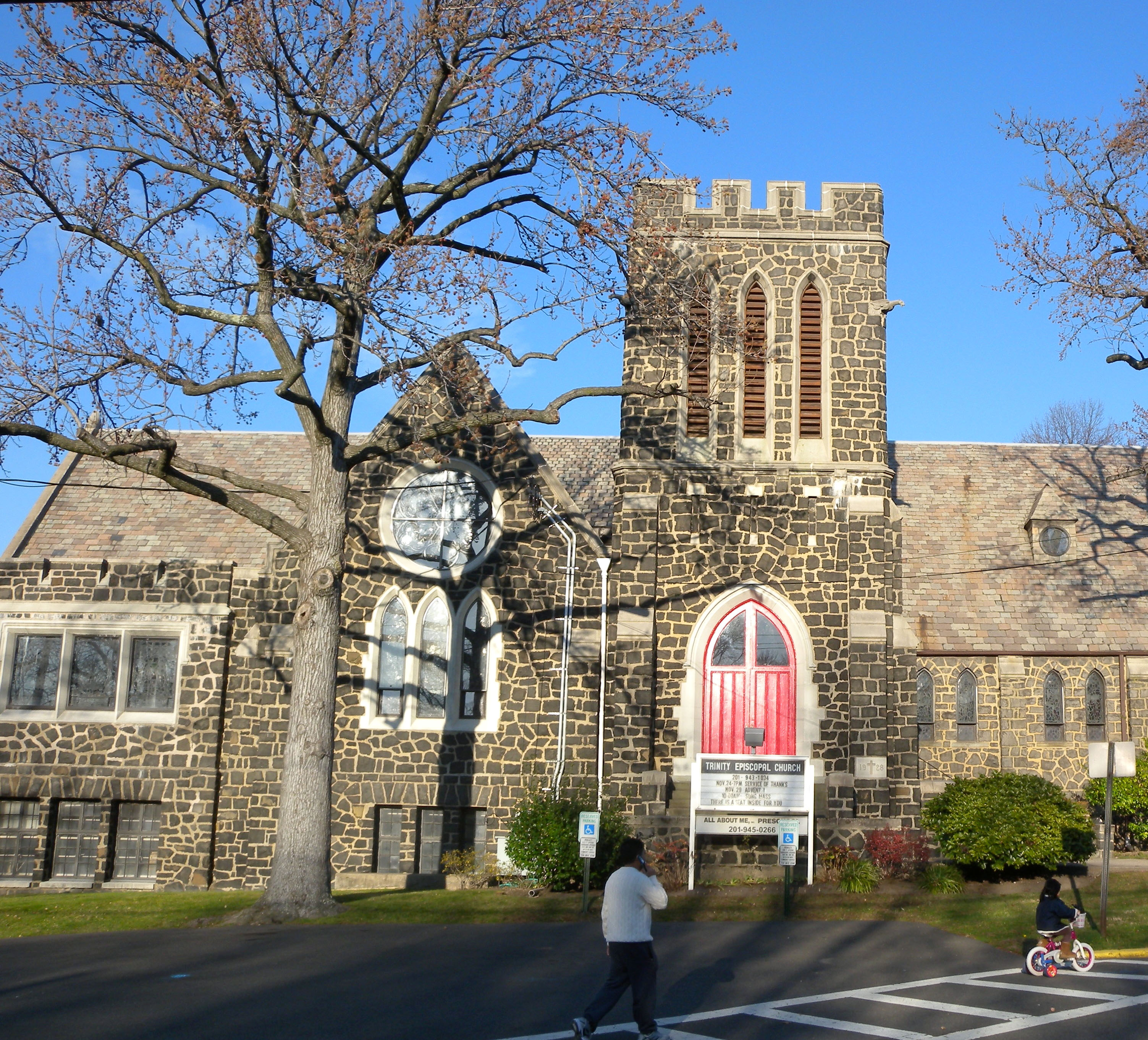
- Trinity Episcopal Church

- Seal
- Motto: "On Top of the Palisades"
- Location of Cliffside Park in Bergen County highlighted in red (left). Inset map: Location of Bergen County in New Jersey highlighted in orange (right).

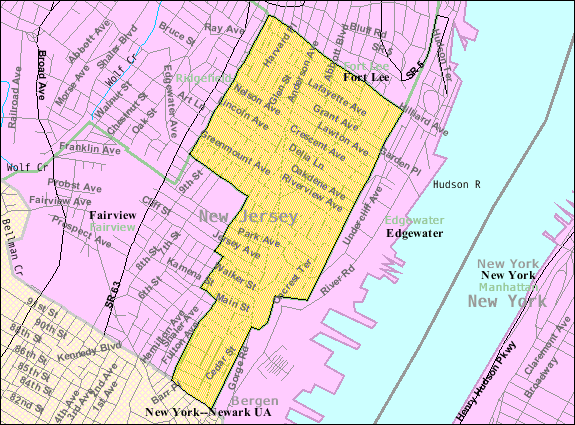
- Census Bureau map of Cliffside Park, New Jersey

- Location in Bergen County Location in New Jersey Location in the United States
- Coordinates: 40.822081°N 73.987834°W
- Country: United States
- State: New Jersey
- County: Bergen
- Incorporated: January 15, 1895
- Named for: "Park by the Cliffs"

Government
  - Type: Borough
  - Body: Borough Council
  - Mayor: Thomas Calabrese (D, term ends December 31, 2027)
  - Administrator: Joseph Rutch
  - Municipal clerk: Sercan Zoklu

Area
  - Total: 0.96 sq mi (2.48 km^{2})
  - Land: 0.96 sq mi (2.48 km^{2})
  - Water: 0 sq mi (0.00 km^{2}) 0.00%
  - Rank: 511th of 565 in state 67th of 70 in county
- Elevation: 253 ft (77 m)

Population (2020)
  - Total: 25,693
  - Estimate (2023): 25,570
  - Rank: 100th of 565 in state 11th of 70 in county
  - Density: 26,875.5/sq mi (10,376.7/km^{2})
  - Rank: 5th of 565 in state 1st of 70 in county
- Time zone: UTC−05:00 (Eastern (EST))
  - Summer (DST): UTC−04:00 (Eastern (EDT))
- ZIP Code: 07010
- Area code: 201
- FIPS code: 3400313570
- GNIS feature ID: 0885187
- Website: www.cliffsideparknj.gov

Cliffside Park is a borough in Bergen County, in the U.S. state of New Jersey. As of the 2020 United States census, the borough's population was 25,693, an increase of 2,099 (+8.9%) from the 2010 census count of 23,594, which in turn reflected an increase of 587 (+2.6%) from the 23,007 counted in the 2000 census.

Cliffside Park was formed based on the results of a referendum held on January 15, 1895, from portions of Ridgefield Township. The borough was formed during the "Boroughitis" phenomenon then sweeping through Bergen County, as one of two boroughs created in 1895 after 26 boroughs were formed in the county in 1894 alone. The borough was named for its location as a "Park by the Cliffs".

U.S. Senator Frank Lautenberg resided in the borough until his death in 2013. Cliffside Park was home to the former Palisades Amusement Park, part of which was located in adjoining Fort Lee. The 38-acre (15 ha) park operated from 1898 until 1971, remaining one of the most-visited amusement parks in the country until its closure, after which the rides and attractions were removed and the site replaced by high-rise apartment buildings.

== Geography ==
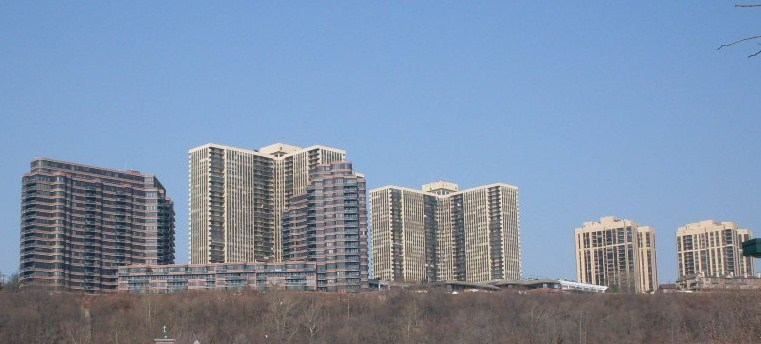
Highrises atop Hudson Palisades

According to the United States Census Bureau, the borough had a total area of 0.96 square miles (2.48 km^{2}), all of which was land. Located atop the Hudson Palisades, Anderson Avenue and Palisade Avenue are the town's major north–south thoroughfares, the latter offering views of the Hudson River and New York City skyline.

Unincorporated communities, localities and place names located partially or completely within the borough include Grantwood and Shadyside.

The borough borders the municipalities of Edgewater, Fairview, Fort Lee and Ridgefield in Bergen County, as well as North Bergen in Hudson County.

Grantwood is named for Grant's Tomb, located on the opposite shore of the river. Gorge Road runs along the face of the cliff to the Edgewater waterfront.

== Demographics ==
Historical population
Census	Pop.	Note	%±
1900	968		—
1910	3,394		250.6%
1920	5,709		68.2%
1930	15,267		167.4%
1940	16,892		10.6%
1950	17,116		1.3%
1960	17,642		3.1%
1970	18,891		7.1%
1980	21,464		13.6%
1990	20,393		−5.0%
2000	23,007		12.8%
2010	23,594		2.6%
2020	25,693		8.9%
2023 (est.)	25,570	▼	−0.5%
Population sources: 1900–1920 1900–1910; 1910–1930 1900–2020; 2000 2010 2020

=== Racial and ethnic composition ===
Cliffside Park borough, Bergen County, New Jersey – Racial and ethnic composition Note: the US Census treats Hispanic/Latino as an ethnic category. This table excludes Latinos from the racial categories and assigns them to a separate category. Hispanics/Latinos may be of any race.
Race / Ethnicity (NH = Non-Hispanic)	Pop 2000	Pop 2010	Pop 2020	% 2000	% 2010	% 2020
White alone (NH)	15,262	12,434	11,185	66.34%	52.70%	43.53%
Black or African American alone (NH)	356	584	656	1.55%	2.48%	2.55%
Native American or Alaska Native alone (NH)	22	24	23	0.10%	0.10%	0.09%
Asian alone (NH)	2,755	3,219	3,784	11.97%	13.64%	14.73%
Native Hawaiian or Pacific Islander alone (NH)	5	10	5	0.02%	0.04%	0.02%
Other race alone (NH)	54	189	354	0.23%	0.80%	1.38%
Mixed race or Multiracial (NH)	376	430	732	1.63%	1.82%	2.85%
Hispanic or Latino (any race)	4,177	6,704	8,954	18.16%	28.41%	34.85%
Total	23,007	23,594	25,693	100.00%	100.00%	100.00%

=== 2020 census ===
As of the 2020 census, Cliffside Park had a population of 25,693. The median age was 41.5 years. 17.9% of residents were under the age of 18 and 19.4% of residents were 65 years of age or older. For every 100 females there were 93.2 males, and for every 100 females age 18 and over there were 91.0 males age 18 and over.

100.0% of residents lived in urban areas, while 0.0% lived in rural areas.

There were 10,735 households in Cliffside Park, of which 26.1% had children under the age of 18 living in them. Of all households, 42.8% were married-couple households, 19.9% were households with a male householder and no spouse or partner present, and 31.5% were households with a female householder and no spouse or partner present. About 31.4% of all households were made up of individuals and 14.1% had someone living alone who was 65 years of age or older.

There were 11,435 housing units, of which 6.1% were vacant. The homeowner vacancy rate was 2.6% and the rental vacancy rate was 2.7%.

=== 2010 census ===
The 2010 United States census counted 23,594 people, 9,948 households, and 6,178 families in the borough. The population density was 24,508.7 per square mile (9,462.9/km^{2}). There were 10,665 housing units at an average density of 11,078.5 per square mile (4,277.4/km^{2}). The racial makeup was 70.11% (16,541) White, 3.29% (776) Black or African American, 0.32% (75) Native American, 13.78% (3,252) Asian, 0.05% (11) Pacific Islander, 8.65% (2,042) from other races, and 3.80% (897) from two or more races. Hispanic or Latino of any race were 28.41% (6,704) of the population.

Of the 9,948 households, 23.6% had children under the age of 18; 44.8% were married couples living together; 11.9% had a female householder with no husband present and 37.9% were non-families. Of all households, 31.6% were made up of individuals and 13.1% had someone living alone who was 65 years of age or older. The average household size was 2.37 and the average family size was 2.98.

17.2% of the population were under the age of 18, 7.7% from 18 to 24, 31.1% from 25 to 44, 26.4% from 45 to 64, and 17.5% who were 65 years of age or older. The median age was 40.5 years. For every 100 females, the population had 93.4 males. For every 100 females ages 18 and older there were 91.6 males.

The Census Bureau's 2006–2010 American Community Survey shows that (in 2010 inflation-adjusted dollars) median household income was $67,856 (with a margin of error of +/− $5,782) and the median family income was $80,856 (+/− $5,828). Males had a median income of $53,529 (+/− $4,598) versus $52,134 (+/− $5,805) for females. The per capita income for the borough was $36,157 (+/− $2,000). About 7.3% of families and 10.5% of the population were below the poverty line, including 13.2% of those under age 18 and 12.4% of those age 65 or over.

Same-sex couples headed 56 households in 2010, a decline from the 72 counted in 2000.

=== 2000 census ===
As of the 2000 United States census there were 23,007 people, 10,027 households, and 6,036 families residing in the borough. The population density was 23,847.7 inhabitants per square mile (9,207.6/km^{2}). There were 10,375 housing units at an average density of 10,754.1 per square mile (4,152.2/km^{2}). The racial makeup of the borough was 77.85% White, 1.83% African American, 0.25% Native American, 12.05% Asian, 0.02% Pacific Islander, 4.97% from other races, and 3.02% from two or more races. Hispanic or Latino of any race were 18.16% of the population.

As of the 2000 census, 3.6% of Cliffside Park's residents identified themselves as being of Armenian American ancestry. This was the highest percentage in New Jersey, and the seventh-highest percentage of Armenian American people in any place in the United States with 1,000 or more residents identifying their ancestry. Additionally, according to the 2000 Census, 1.3% of Cliffside Park identified themselves as Turkish American, the sixth-highest of any municipality in the United States and four-highest in the state.

There were 10,027 households, out of which 21.9% had children under the age of 18 living with them, 46.2% were married couples living together, 9.8% had a female householder with no husband present, and 39.8% were non-families. 33.8% of all households were made up of individuals, and 13.8% had someone living alone who was 65 years of age or older. The average household size was 2.29 and the average family size was 2.95.

In the borough the population was spread out, with 16.9% under the age of 18, 7.4% from 18 to 24, 33.6% from 25 to 44, 23.8% from 45 to 64, and 18.4% who were 65 years of age or older. The median age was 40 years. For every 100 females, there were 93.1 males. For every 100 females age 18 and over, there were 90.6 males.

The median income for a household in the borough was $46,288, and the median income for a family was $54,915. Males had a median income of $40,114 versus $36,100 for females. The per capita income for the borough was $28,516. About 8.5% of families and 10.7% of the population were below the poverty line, including 12.1% of those under age 18 and 10.2% of those age 65 or over.

=== Religion ===
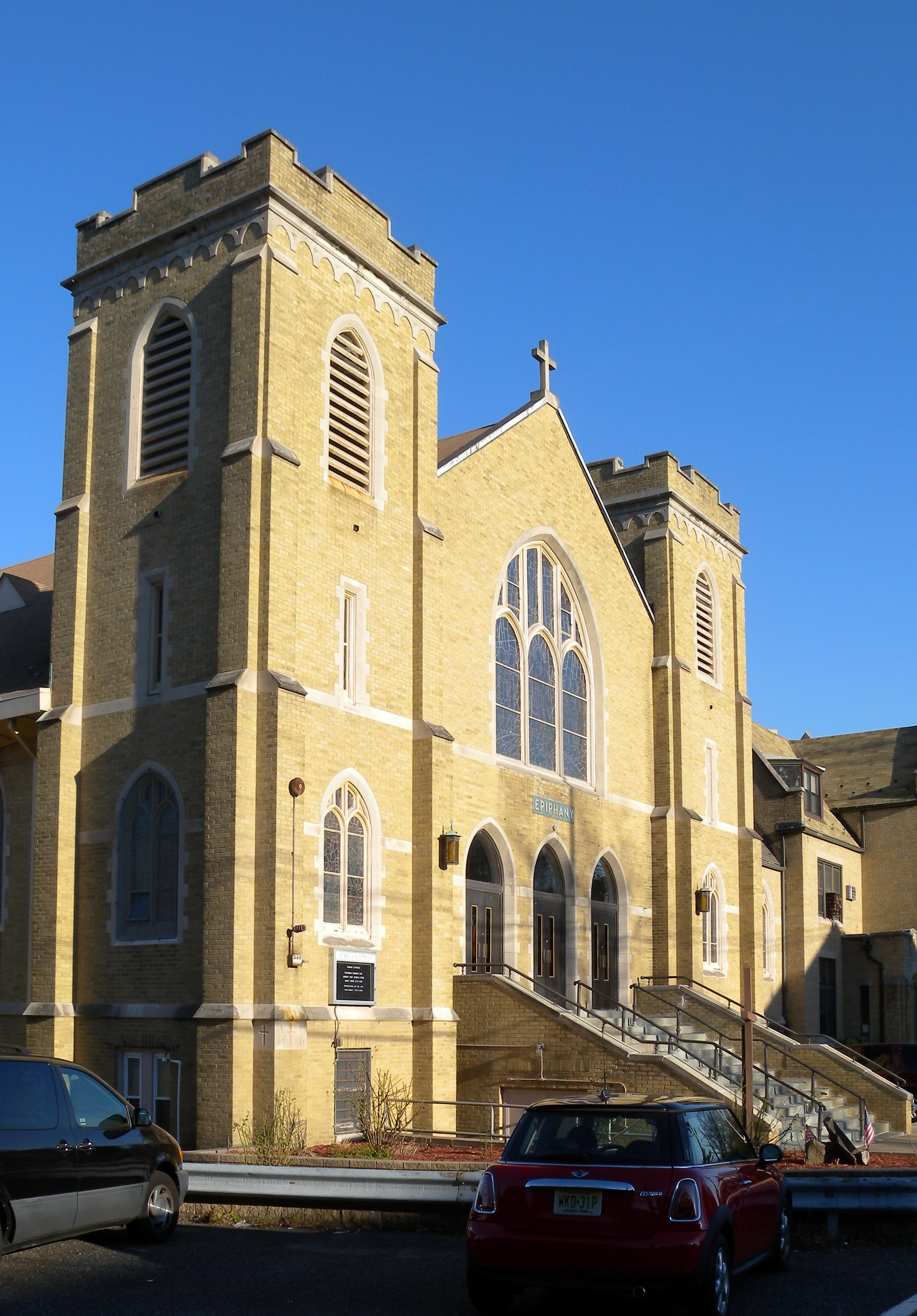
Roman Catholic Church of the Epiphany

As of 2011, more than three quarters of Cliffside Park residents categorize themselves as being affiliated with a formal religious body. A majority of the borough is Roman Catholic (52.60%), many of whom attend the Roman Catholic Church of the Epiphany on Knox Avenue. 8.12% Jewish; 1.21% Lutheran; 1.20% Episcopalian; 0.84% Methodist; 0.88% Muslim; 0.62% Baptist; 0.46% Pentecostal; and 0.02% Eastern Orthodox Christian.

== Government ==
=== Local government ===
Cliffside Park is governed under the borough form of New Jersey municipal government, which is used in 218 municipalities (of the 564) statewide, making it the most common form of government in New Jersey. The governing body is comprised of a mayor and a borough council, with all positions elected at-large on a partisan basis as part of the November general election. A mayor is elected directly by the voters to a four-year term of office. The borough council includes six members elected to serve three-year terms on a staggered basis, with two seats coming up for election each year in a three-year cycle. The borough form of government used by Cliffside Park is a "weak mayor / strong council" government in which council members act as the legislative body, with the mayor presiding at meetings and voting only in the event of a tie. The mayor can veto ordinances subject to an override by a two-thirds majority vote of the council. The mayor makes committee and liaison assignments for council members, and most appointments are made by the mayor with the advice and consent of the council.

As of 2026, the Mayor of Cliffside Park is Democrat Thomas Calabrese, who was elected to serve a term of office ending December 31, 2027. Members of the borough council are Council President Peter J. Colao (D, 2028), John Chmielewski (D, 2027), Kenneth J. Corcoran (D, 2028), Dana Martinotti (D, 2026), Selvie Nikaj (D, 2027) and Eurice Rojas (R, 2026).

In October 2019, the borough council appointed John Chmielewski to fill the seat expiring in December 2021 that had been held by Donna M. Spoto until she resigned from her seat the previous month after 31 years in office in order to move out of the borough.

In May 2015, the borough council selected Thomas Calabrese from a list of three candidates nominated by the Democratic municipal committee to fill the vacant mayoral seat. Calabrese replaced his father, Gerald Calabrese, who was elected to the borough council in 1955 and had served continuously as mayor of Cliffside Park from 1965 until his death in April 2015, making him the longest-serving mayor in state history. In June 2015, Peter Colao was appointed to fill the vacant council seat expiring in December 2016 that had been held by Calabrese before he was selected to fill the vacancy as mayor.

=== Federal, state, and county representation ===
Cliffside Park is located in the 9th Congressional District and is part of New Jersey's 36th state legislative district.

For the 119th United States Congress, New Jersey's 9th congressional district is represented by Nellie Pou (D, North Haledon) New Jersey is represented in the United States Senate by Democrats Cory Booker (Newark, term ends 2027) and Andy Kim (Moorestown, term ends 2031).

For the 2026–2027 session, the 36th legislative district of the New Jersey Legislature is represented in the State Senate by Paul Sarlo (D, Wood-Ridge) and in the General Assembly by Clinton Calabrese (D, Cliffside Park) and Gary Schaer (D, Passaic).

Bergen County is governed by a directly elected County Executive, with legislative functions performed by a Board of County Commissioners comprised of seven members who are elected at-large to three-year terms in partisan elections on a staggered basis, with either two or three seats coming up for election each November; a Chairman and Vice Chairman are selected from among its seven members at a reorganization meeting held every January. As of 2025, the county executive is James J. Tedesco III (D, Paramus), whose four-year term of office ends December 31, 2026.

Bergen County's Commissioners are Chair Mary J. Amoroso (D, Mahwah, 2025), Vice Chair Steven A. Tanelli (D, North Arlington, 2027), Chair Pro Tem Joan Voss (D, Fort Lee, 2026), Rafael Marte (D, Bergenfield, 2026), Germaine M. Ortiz (D, Emerson, 2025), Thomas J. Sullivan Jr. (D, Montvale, 2025) and Tracy Silna Zur (D, Franklin Lakes, 2027).

Bergen County's elected constitutional officials are Clerk John S. Hogan (D, Northvale, 2026), Sheriff Anthony Cureton (D, Englewood, 2027) and Surrogate Michael R. Dressler (D, Cresskill, 2026).

=== Politics ===
Presidential election results

United States presidential election results for Cliffside Park
Year	Republican		Democratic		Third party(ies)	
Year	No.	%	No.	%	No.	%
2024	4,149	46.59%	4,495	50.47%	262	2.94%
2020	3,992	38.76%	6,217	60.37%	90	0.87%
2016	3,119	35.25%	5,474	61.87%	254	2.87%
2012	2,627	32.39%	5,410	66.71%	73	0.90%
2008	3,095	36.16%	5,348	62.48%	116	1.36%
2004	3,232	38.86%	5,024	60.40%	62	0.75%
2000	2,313	29.46%	5,333	67.94%	204	2.60%
1996	2,172	27.41%	5,151	65.00%	602	7.60%
1992	3,042	35.40%	4,548	52.92%	1,004	11.68%
1988	4,575	50.89%	4,382	48.74%	33	0.37%
1984	5,776	58.34%	4,097	41.38%	27	0.27%
1980	5,223	52.51%	3,808	38.29%	915	9.20%
1976	5,006	50.22%	4,834	48.50%	128	1.28%
1972	5,910	64.53%	3,186	34.79%	63	0.69%
1968	4,414	52.72%	3,407	40.70%	551	6.58%
1964	3,059	35.31%	5,582	64.43%	23	0.27%
1960	5,137	53.80%	4,394	46.02%	18	0.19%

As of March 2011, there were a total of 11,107 registered voters in Cliffside Park, of which 4,749 (42.8% vs. 31.7% countywide) were registered as Democrats, 1,166 (10.5% vs. 21.1%) were registered as Republicans and 5,185 (46.7% vs. 47.1%) were registered as Unaffiliated. There were 7 voters registered as Libertarians or Greens. Among the borough's 2010 Census population, 47.1% (vs. 57.1% in Bergen County) were registered to vote, including 56.9% of those ages 18 and over (vs. 73.7% countywide).

In recent years, Cliffside Park has leaned strongly toward the Democratic Party. In the 2016 presidential election, Democrat Hillary Clinton received 5,474 votes (61.1% vs. 54.2% countywide), ahead of Republican Donald Trump with 3,119 votes (34.8% vs. 41.1% countywide) and other candidates with 221 votes (2.5% vs. 3.0% countywide), among the 8,953 ballots cast by the borough's 12,979 registered voters for a turnout of 68.9% (vs. 73% in Bergen County). In the 2012 presidential election, Democrat Barack Obama received 5,410 votes (66.0% vs. 54.8% countywide), ahead of Republican Mitt Romney with 2,627 votes (32.0% vs. 43.5%) and other candidates with 64 votes (0.8% vs. 0.9%), among the 8,203 ballots cast by the borough's 11,870 registered voters, for a turnout of 69.1% (vs. 70.4% in Bergen County). In the 2008 presidential election, Democrat Barack Obama received 5,348 votes (61.9% vs. 53.9% countywide), ahead of Republican John McCain with 3,095 votes (35.8% vs. 44.5%) and other candidates with 88 votes (1.0% vs. 0.8%), among the 8,636 ballots cast by the borough's 11,775 registered voters, for a turnout of 73.3% (vs. 76.8% in Bergen County).

Gubernatorial election results for Cliffside Park
Year	Republican		Democratic		Third party(ies)	
Year	No.	%	No.	%	No.	%
2025	2,443	38.01%	3,938	61.26%	47	0.73%
2021	1,838	38.74%	2,881	60.73%	25	0.53%
2017	1,113	28.33%	2,760	70.25%	56	1.43%
2013	2,207	48.48%	2,298	50.48%	47	1.03%
2009	1,914	35.15%	3,305	60.70%	226	4.15%
2005	1,555	29.08%	3,677	68.77%	115	2.15%

In the 2013 gubernatorial election, Democrat Barbara Buono received 52.0% of the vote (2,298 cast), ahead of Republican Chris Christie with 47.0% (2,077 votes), and other candidates with 1.1% (47 votes), among the 4,639 ballots cast by the borough's 11,249 registered voters (217 ballots were spoiled), for a turnout of 41.2%.

United States Senate election results for Cliffside Park1
Year	Republican		Democratic		Third party(ies)	
Year	No.	%	No.	%	No.	%
2024	3,433	41.23%	4,606	55.31%	288	3.46%
2018	2,090	33.45%	3,976	63.64%	182	2.91%
2012	2,200	29.34%	5,187	69.17%	112	1.49%
2006	1,750	33.93%	3,332	64.61%	75	1.45%

United States Senate election results for Cliffside Park2
Year	Republican		Democratic		Third party(ies)	
Year	No.	%	No.	%	No.	%
2020	3,548	35.80%	6,168	62.24%	194	1.96%
2014	1,221	29.37%	2,866	68.93%	71	1.71%
2013	842	32.14%	1,742	66.49%	36	1.37%
2008	2,236	28.72%	5,442	69.90%	107	1.37%

==== List of mayors ====
Cliffside Park was formed in 1895 and has the borough form of New Jersey municipal government. It has had numerous mayors, several of whom served non-consecutive terms. Gerald Calabrese was the longest-serving mayor (50 years) in New Jersey at the time of his death. The following is a list of previous mayors:

- Thomas Calabrese (D) 2015 acting, 2016 to present
- Gerald Calabrese (D) (1961–1963, 1965 to 2015) the longest-serving mayor in New Jersey
- James F Madden (1963–1965)
- Frederick F. Dyer (R) (1958 to 1959)
- Francis J. Murphy (1954–1957)
- Edward Ulrich (R) (1952–1959)
- William T. Michaelson (1950 to 1951) He was indicted in 1951, and again in 1953, on charges of failure to enforce gambling laws, but the charges were dropped in 1955.
- Joseph C. Woodcock (1939–1943)
- Thomas A. Fox (1934–1939) Died in office in his third term.
- Frank A. Meyer (1931–1934)
- Joseph W. Marini (R) (1924–1929, 1944–1947), twice defeated Edward Aloysius Kenney, an unsuccessful candidate who ran as an independent in 1921, as a Republican in 1923, and as a Democrat in 1927. (Kenney later defeated Marini in a race for the U.S. House of Representatives.) Became New Jersey Superior Court judge. New Jersey Assembly 1944-1945
- John C. Cadien (1918–1924) Instrumental in the establishment of Cliffside Park Public Library
- S. Wood McClave (1910–1914)
- John E. Ferdinand (1904–1906)
- August Neuman (1895–1904, 1906–1910, 1914–1918) An investor in Palisades Amusement Park, he was the first mayor of the borough. He asked the wife of Gaetano Bresci to move out of the town after her husband assassinated Umberto I of Italy. Served as postmaster 1895–1914. He was briefly shunned by townsfolk after a forgery of his signature.

== Education ==
The Cliffside Park School District serves public school students in pre-kindergarten through twelfth grade. As of the 2021–22 school year, the district, comprised of five schools, had an enrollment of 3,074 students and 255.7 classroom teachers (on an FTE basis), for a student–teacher ratio of 12.0:1. Schools in the district (with 2021–22 enrollment data from the National Center for Education Statistics) are Number 3 School with 358 students in grades PreK-4, Number 4 School with 485 students in grades K-5, Number 5 School with 275 students in grades PreK-4, Number 6 School / Cliffside Park Middle School with 692 students in grades 5-8 and Cliffside Park High School with 1,192 students in grades 9-12. Students from Fairview attend the district's high school as part of a sending/receiving relationship with the Fairview Public Schools.

Public school students from the borough, and all of Bergen County, are eligible to attend the secondary education programs offered by the Bergen County Technical Schools, which include the Bergen County Academies in Hackensack, and the Bergen Tech campus in Teterboro or Paramus. The district offers programs on a shared-time or full-time basis, with admission based on a selective application process and tuition covered by the student's home school district.

For generations, the borough was the home of Epiphany School, an elementary school of the Roman Catholic Church of the Epiphany. Completed in 1930, having been constructed under the direction of Msgr. Anthony J. Ferretti, the school was staffed by the Sisters of Charity of St. Elizabeth (Convent Station, New Jersey). In 2005, due to changing demographics and low enrollment, the Roman Catholic Archdiocese of Newark decided to merge Epiphany School with Christ the Teacher Interparochial School in Fort Lee, New Jersey, which is jointly sponsored by Epiphany RC Church, Madonna RC Church (Fort Lee), Holy Trinity RC Church (Fort Lee) and Holy Rosary RC Church (Edgewater).

== Transportation ==
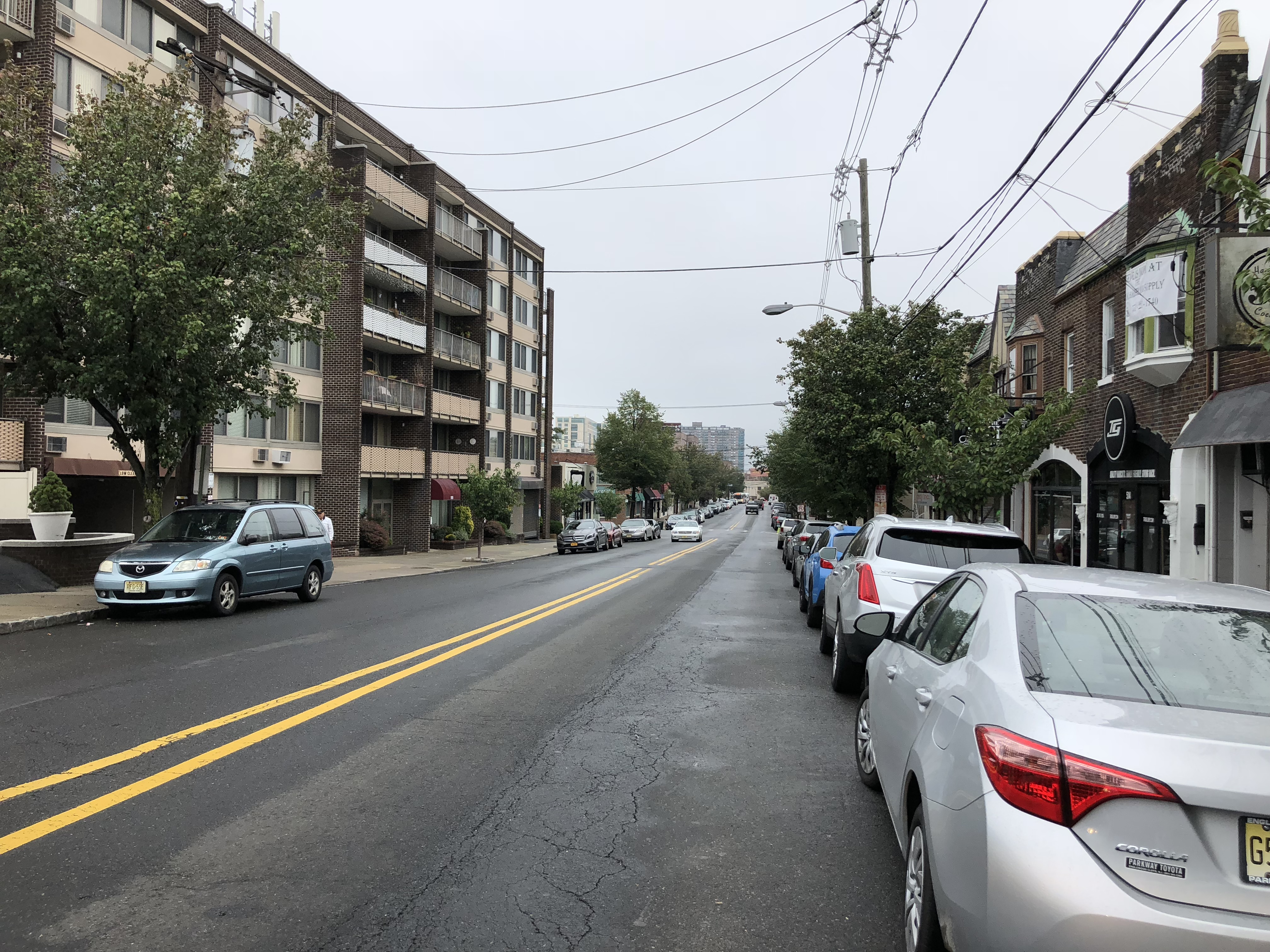
County Route 29 (Anderson Avenue) in Cliffside Park

=== Roads and highways ===
As of May 2010, the borough had a total of 24.47 miles (39.38 km) of roadways, of which 20.29 miles (32.65 km) were maintained by the municipality and 4.18 miles (6.73 km) by Bergen County.

Palisade Avenue and Anderson Avenue are the main north–south roads of Cliffside Park.

=== Public transportation ===
NJ Transit bus lines 156, 159 and 181 offer service to and from Manhattan; the 22 route serves Jersey City; and the 751 and 755 offer local service.

== Popular culture ==
Many films have had scenes filmed in Cliffside Park.

Exteriors for The Vampire (1913), directed by Robert G. Vignola and starring Alice Hollister and Harry F. Millarde were filmed in the borough.

Scenes from Cop Land, directed by James Mangold and starring Sylvester Stallone, Harvey Keitel and Ray Liotta were filmed here.

Portions of the 1988 film Big, starring Tom Hanks and directed by Penny Marshall, were filmed in Cliffside Park.

The exterior shown for the Heffernan house that was used in CBS sitcom The King of Queens is located in the borough.

== Notable people ==
People who were born in, residents of, or otherwise closely associated with Cliffside Park include:

- Randi Altschul (born 1960), toy inventor
- Oksana Baiul (born 1977), figure skater
- Ed Benguiat (1927–2020), typographer and lettering artist who crafted over 600 typeface designs including Bookman, Souvenir and the eponymous ITC Benguiat
- Betsy Blair (1923–2009), actress of film and stage, long based in London
- Nick Borelli (1905–1992), professional football player who spent one season in the National Football League with the Newark Tornadoes in 1930
- Clinton Calabrese (born 1986), politician who has represented the 36th Legislative District in the New Jersey General Assembly since February 2018
- Gerald Calabrese (1925–2015), former professional basketball player who served 50 consecutive years as mayor of Cliffside Park
- Rene Paul Chambellan (1893–1955), architectural sculptor
- Ann Corio (1909–1999), burlesque stripper, actress
- William J. Dorgan (1921–2003), was a politician who served in the New Jersey General Assembly, as Mayor of Palisades Park, New Jersey, and as a member of the Bergen County Board of Chosen Freeholders
- Joseph Dunninger (1892–1975), mentalist
- Ruth Brewer Eisenberg (1902–1996), "Ivory" of Ebony and Ivory
- Bruce Elia (born 1953), former NFL football player / local businessman
- Eileen Farrell (1920–2002), opera singer
- Frank H. Field (1922–2013), chemist and mass spectrometrist known for his work in the development of chemical ionization
- Fred C. Galda (1918–1997), Superior Court judge and mayor of Paramus, New Jersey
- Gloria Gaynor (born 1949), singer
- Ray Gillen (1959–1993), former member of Black Sabbath
- Heidi Groskreutz (born 1981), dancer and finalist on the second season of So You Think You Can Dance
- Valerie Huttle (born 1956), politician who represented the 37th Legislative District in the New Jersey General Assembly from 2006 to 2022
- Alfred J. Kahn (1919–2009), social policy expert
- Edward Aloysius Kenney (1884–1938), member of the United States House of Representatives
- Frank Lautenberg (1924–2013), United States Senator
- Gus Lesnevich (1915–1964), boxer
- Remy Ma (born 1981), Grammy Award-winning rapper
- John Marin (1870–1953), artist known for his watercolors
- Ralph Mercado (1941–2009), promoter of Latin American music
- Otto Messmer (1892–1983), animator
- Ed Mioduszewski (1931–2010), former NFL football player
- Chris Neild (born 1987), NFL player
- Randy Neumann (born 1948), boxing referee and former professional boxer
- Charles Henry Niehaus (1855–1935), sculptor
- Archibald Olpp (1882–1949), member of the United States House of Representatives
- Daphne Oz (born 1986), author and talk show host
- Mehmet Oz (born 1960), cardiothoracic surgeon, talk show host and author
- Joe Pantoliano (born 1951), actor
- Patrick J. Roma (1949–2017), lawyer and politician who represented the 38th Legislative District in the New Jersey General Assembly from 1988 to 1997
- David Saperstein (1901–1990), lawyer and government regulator who helped create the Securities and Exchange Commission
- Julia Scotti, transgender stand-up comedian
- Harold Snyder (1922–2008), co-founder of generic drug manufacturer Biocraft Laboratories
- Manny Suárez (born 1993), basketball player who has competed internationally on the Chile national team
- Joseph C. Woodcock (1925–1997), politician who served in the New Jersey General Assembly, New Jersey Senate and as Bergen County Prosecutor
- Maysoon Zayid (born 1974), actress, comedian and activist

== Sources ==
- Municipal Incorporations of the State of New Jersey (according to Counties), prepared by the Division of Local Government, Department of the Treasury (New Jersey); December 1, 1958.
- Clayton, W. Woodford; and Nelson, Nelson. History of Bergen and Passaic Counties, New Jersey, with Biographical Sketches of Many of its Pioneers and Prominent Men. Philadelphia: Everts and Peck, 1882.
- Harvey, Cornelius Burnham (ed.), Genealogical History of Hudson and Bergen Counties, New Jersey. New York: New Jersey Genealogical Publishing Co., 1900.
- Van Valen, James M. History of Bergen County, New Jersey. New York: New Jersey Publishing and Engraving Co., 1900.
- Westervelt, Frances A. (Frances Augusta), 1858–1942, History of Bergen County, New Jersey, 1630–1923, Lewis Historical Publishing Company, 1923.
