= Cornelius Demarest House =

Historic house in New Jersey, United States

- U.S. National Register of Historic Places
- New Jersey Register of Historic Places
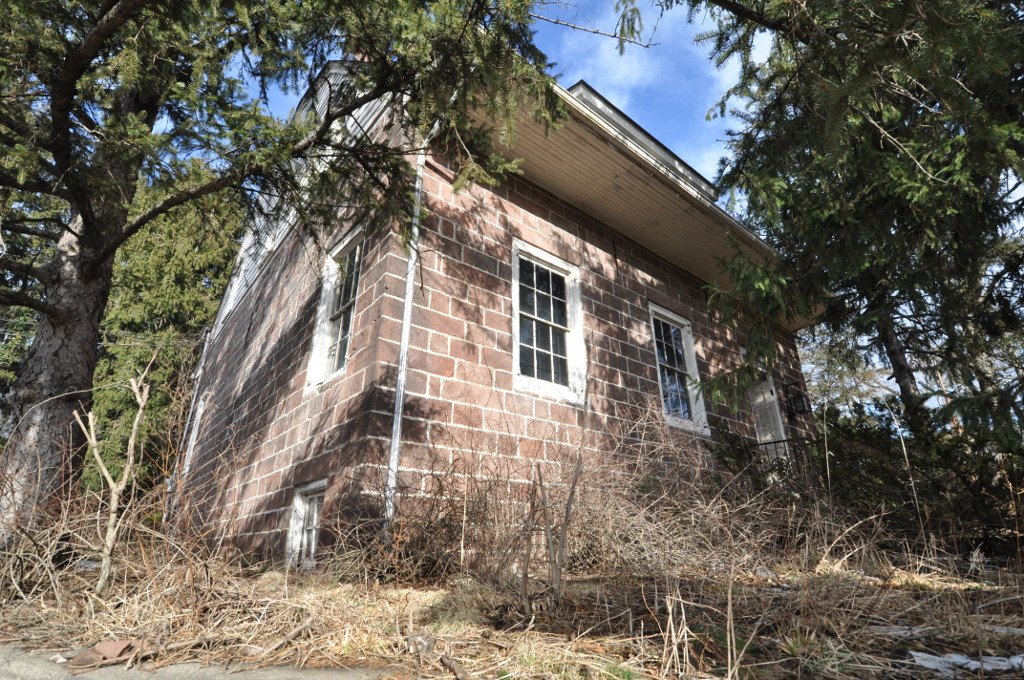
- House in 2019

- Location within Bergen County, New Jersey Location within New Jersey Location within the United States
- Location: 12 Rochelle Avenue, Rochelle Park, New Jersey
- Coordinates: 40°53′43″N 74°4′43″W
- Built by: Samuel C. Demarest
- MPS: Stone Houses of Bergen County TR
- NRHP reference No.: 83001495
- NJRHP No.: 659

Significant dates
- Added to NRHP: January 10, 1983
- Designated NJRHP: October 3, 1980

The Cornelius Demarest House is located at 12 Rochelle Avenue in the township of Rochelle Park in Bergen County, New Jersey, United States. It was documented by the Historic American Buildings Survey (HABS) in 1936. The historic stone house was added to the National Register of Historic Places on January 10, 1983, for its significance in architecture. It was listed as part of the Early Stone Houses of Bergen County Multiple Property Submission (MPS).

According to the nomination form, Samuel C. Demarest built this house for his son Cornelius Demarest.

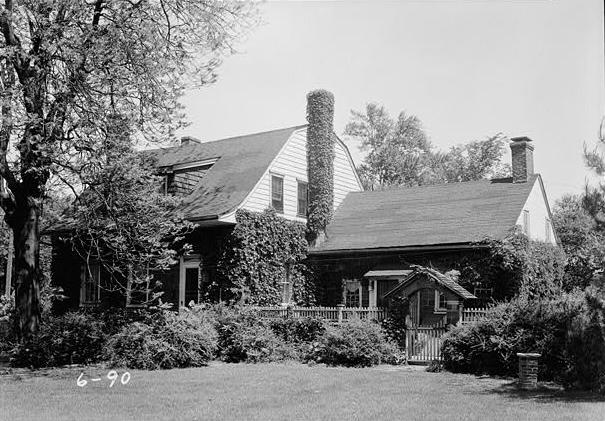
HABS image from 1936

== See also ==
- National Register of Historic Places listings in Bergen County, New Jersey
