= New York, Susquehanna and Western 206 =

Preserved American diesel switcher locomotive

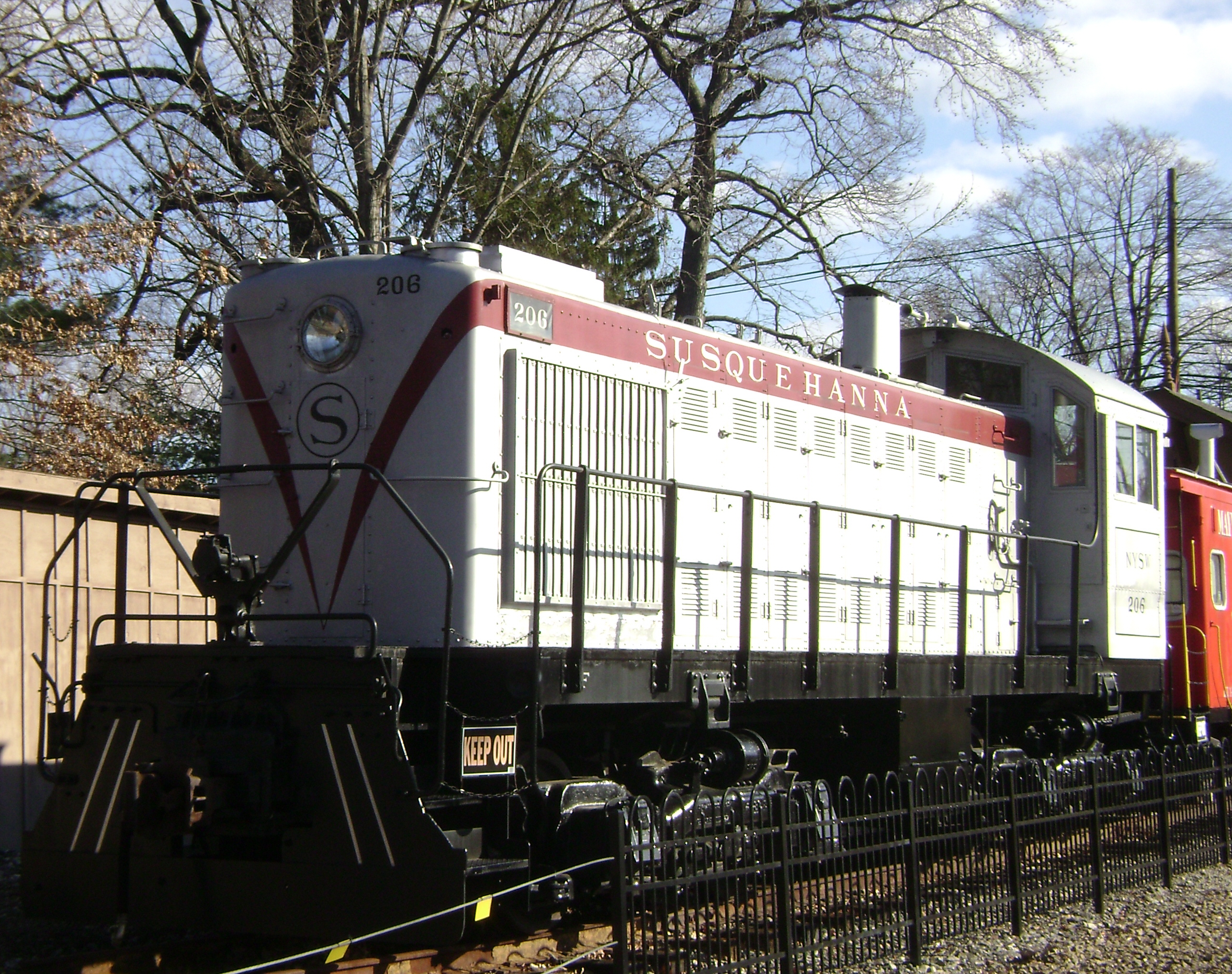
- NYS&W No. 206 on display at Maywood Station, on December 24, 2011
Type and origin
- Power type: Diesel-electric
- Builder: American Locomotive Company
- Model: S-2
- Build date: April 1942
Specifications
- Configuration
  - AAR: B-B
- Gauge: 4 ft 8 1/2 in (1,435 mm) standard gauge
- Trucks: Blunt
- Wheel diameter: 40 in (1,016 mm)
- Minimum curve: 50° or 118.31 ft (36.06 m)
- Wheelbase: 30 ft 6 in (9.30 m)
- Length: 46 ft (14.02 m)
- Width: 10 ft 2 1/2 in (3.11 m)
- Height: 14 ft 6 in (4.42 m)
- Loco weight: 230,000 lb (100,000 kg)
- Fuel capacity: 635 US gal (2,400 L; 529 imp gal)
- Prime mover: Alco 539T
- Engine type: Inline 6 Four-stroke diesel
- Displacement: 1,595 cu in (26.14 L) per cylinder 9,572 cu in (156.86 L) total
- Generator: GE GT 553-A
- Traction motors: (4) GE 731
- Cylinders: 6
- Cylinder size: 12 1/2 in × 13 in (318 mm × 330 mm)
Performance figures
- Power output: 1,000 hp (746 kW) @ 740 rpm
- Tractive effort: 57,500 lb (26,100 kg)
Career
- Operators: New York, Susquehanna and Western Railway
- Numbers: NYS&W 206
- Delivered: April 1942
- Retired: 1985
- Current owner: Maywood Station Historical Committee
- Disposition: On static display
- New York, Susquehanna & Western Railroad ALCO Type S-2 Locomotive #206
- U.S. National Register of Historic Places
- New Jersey Register of Historic Places
- Location within Bergen County, New Jersey Location within New Jersey Location within the United States
- Location: 271 Maywood Avenue, Maywood, New Jersey
- Coordinates: 40°53′46″N 74°3′58″W
- Area: 0.1 acres (0.040 ha)
- NRHP reference No.: 09001072
- NJRHP No.: 4926

Significant dates
- Added to NRHP: March 19, 2010
- Designated NJRHP: September 9, 2009

New York, Susquehanna and Western Railroad No. 206 is a preserved S-2 class diesel switcher locomotive on display in at the Maywood Station Museum in Maywood, New Jersey. No. 206 was built by ALCO in 1942 for the New York, Susquehanna and Western Railroad (NYS&W), as part of their process to dieselize their locomotive roster. No. 206 served the railroad in freight and switching services for several years, until it was retired in 1985, due to mechanical issues. As of 2026, No. 206 is on static display at the Maywood Station Museum, under the ownership of the Maywood Station Historical Committee.

== History ==
=== Design and construction ===
From April 1940 to June 1950, the American Locomotive Company (ALCO) of Schenectady, New York, along with Canadian subsidiary Montreal Locomotive Works (MLW), produced 1,502 copies of their S-2 class locomotive for various railroads across the United States and Canada. The S-2s were equipped with turbochargers and Blunt-type trucks, and they were able to generate 1,000 horsepower (750 kW).

In the early 1940s, the New York, Susquehanna and Western Railroad (NYS&W) was undergoing a bankruptcy reorganization process, under the leadership of trustee Walter Kidde. One of the tasks Kidde opted to arrange for the railroad was to dieselize their locomotive roster to reduce their operating costs. In 1941, the NYS&W placed an order for six S-2s from ALCO, and they were able to do so during World War II, since the War Production Board limited production for road locomotives, but allowed switcher production to continue on.

The six S-2s were delivered to the NYS&W in March and April 1942. As part of a new diesel-numbering system that was implemented on the NYS&W, the even-numbered S-2s (Nos. 202, 204, 206, and 208) were equipped with multiple-unit controls, while the odd-numbered S-2s (Nos. 203 and 205) were equipped without.

=== Revenue service ===
S-2 No. 206 was delivered to the NYS&W in April 1942, and it began serving as a switcher for the railroad's branch lines and yards throughout New Jersey. It also occasionally operated with some of the railroad's ALCO RS-1s in mainline freight service. By the early 1960s, most of the NYS&W's ALCO locomotives began to suffer from mechanical problems, and three EMD GP18s were purchased to assist them. Nearly all of the S-2s were subsequently left in outdoor storage in Little Ferry, and they were cannibalized for parts to keep No. 206 operable. By the late 1970s, No. 206 remained in service solely as a locomotive shop switcher in Little Ferry.

In 1980, the NYS&W was purchased by the Delaware Otsego Corporation (DO), and they began to reorganize the company's operations, which involved the scrapping of the inoperable S-2s in Little Ferry. No. 206 was retained, since it was still in good condition. In early 1985, the NYS&W overhauled No. 206, and they partnered with the Bergen-Rockland chapter of the National Railway Historical Society (NRHS) to repaint it. That same year, the railway purchased a section of former Lehigh and Hudson River Railway (L&HR) trackage between Franklin and Lime Crest, New Jersey, and No. 206 became reassigned to operate on the route.

No. 206 began hauling occasional freight trains on the route in March 1985, and for the first run, NYS&W president and CEO Walter Rich served as the engineer. Some months later, No. 206 suffered an engine failure, and it had to be removed from service for repairs. Simultaneously, the NYS&W began to purchase a fleet of EMD SD45s, and due to the SD45s' superior reliability, the NYS&W reluctantly decided to retire all of their remaining ALCO locomotives, including No. 206.

=== Retirement and display ===
In 1988, the NYS&W traded No. 206 to General Electric (GE) for an order of four GE Dash 8-40Bs. The following year, GE donated No. 206 to the United Railroad Historical Society (URHS) for inclusion in their proposed museum. Throughout the 1990s, the URHS occasionally towed No. 206 to various railroad locations for special events, but by the end of the decade, they left it in undisclosed storage at the Public Service Electric and Gas Company (PSE&G) station in Ridgefield Park.

In 2006, the Maywood Station Historical Committee (MSHC), a division of the NYS&W Technical and Historical Society, entered negotiations with the URHS to have No. 206 relocated for display at the Maywood Station Museum. The URHS agreed to the proposal, and they donated the locomotive to the MSHC. In October 2008, No. 206 was towed to the station museum, where it was placed on static display and received a cosmetic restoration. On March 19, 2010, No. 206 became listed on the National Register of Historic Places (NRHP).

== See also ==
- New York, Susquehanna and Western 142
- United States Army 4039

== Bibliography ==
- Hartley, Scott (January 1988). "Regionals In Review - The Delaware Otsego Story". Trains. Vol. 48, no. 3. Kalmbach Publishing. pp. 28–41.
- Tupaczewski, Paul R. (2002). New York, Susquehanna and Western In Color. Scotch Plains, New Jersey: Morning Sun Books, Inc. ISBN 1-58248-070-2.
