= Toimi Jarvi =

Finnish American football player (1920–1977)

No. 32
- Positions: Quarterback, Halfback

Personal information
- Born: February 28, 1920; DeKalb, Illinois, U.S.
- Died: November 18, 1977 (aged 57); Chicago, Illinois, U.S.
- Listed height: 6 ft 0 in (1.83 m)
- Listed weight: 200 lb (91 kg)

Career information
- High school: DeKalb (IL)
- College: Northern Illinois
- NFL draft: 1944: undrafted

Career history
- Philadelphia Eagles (1944); Pittsburgh Steelers (1945)

Career NFL statistics
- Games played: 6
- Rushing yards: 40
- Stats at Pro Football Reference

Toimi Valentino Jarvi (February 28, 1920 – November 18, 1977) was a Finnish professional American football quarterback and halfback who played two seasons in the National Football League (NFL). Jarvi played with the Philadelphia Eagles and Pittsburgh Steelers. In addition to football, he played basketball and baseball.

== Early life and education ==
Toimi Jarvi was born on February 28, 1920, in DeKalb, Illinois. Jarvi attended DeKalb for high school and Northern Illinois for college. While at Northern Illinois, Toimi played football, basketball, and baseball. He was at Northern Illinois from 1938 to 1941, and was popular as a quarterback and halfback. He would be inducted into the school's Hall of Fame in 1988. After his college career, but before his professional career, he was a teacher at Moline. He then was employed as an athletic instructor in Chicago.

== Professional career ==
In 1944, Jarvi was given a contract by the Philadelphia Eagles of the National Football League (NFL). He was one of twelve quarterbacks at the Philadelphia training camp that season, but was one of the few who were able to make the roster. However, Jarvi played halfback instead of quarterback, as the Eagles already used Roy Zimmerman and Allie Sherman at the quarterback position. The Eagles played in twelve games that season, but Toimi only appeared in five of them. In his five games he had five rushes for sixteen yards, and one catch for nine yards. On defense he had one interception and on special teams he had two punt returns for twenty-two yards. He was traded after the season to the Pittsburgh Steelers for John Butler. Jarvi only made one appearance with the Steelers in 1945. He played quarterback in his one-game, going four for ten for fifty yards and three interceptions. He also made a lateral which was caught and became a sixty-five-yard touchdown. In addition to quarterback, Jarvi played halfback, defense, and punter in his second season. His offensive statistics included nine rushes for twenty-four yards; his defensive statistics were one fumble recovery returned minus seventeen yards; and his punting statistics were two punts for sixty-nine yards. He did not make any more appearances after the game.

== Death ==
Jarvi died on November 18, 1977, in Chicago, Illinois, at the age of 57.
