= Rochelle Park School District =

School district in Bergen County, New Jersey, US

Address
- 300 Rochelle Avenue Rochelle Park, Bergen County, New Jersey, 07662; United States
- Coordinates: 40.905431°N 74.077227°W

District information
- Grades: PreK-8
- Superintendent: Sue DeNobile
- Business administrator: James Riley
- Schools: 1

Students and staff
- Enrollment: 502 (as of 2022–23)
- Faculty: 48.0 FTEs
- Student–teacher ratio: 10.5:1

Other information
- District Factor Group: FG
- Website: www.rochellepark.org
Ind.	Per pupil	District spending	Rank (*)	K-8 average	%± vs. average
1A	Total Spending	$17,939	28	$18,891	−5.0%
1	Budgetary Cost	11,160	5	14,159	−21.2%
2	Classroom Instruction	7,150	5	8,659	−17.4%
6	Support Services	1,271	3	2,167	−41.3%
8	Administrative Cost	1,537	19	1,547	−0.6%
10	Operations & Maintenance	1,110	10	1,612	−31.1%
13	Extracurricular Activities	60	15	104	−42.3%
16	Median Teacher Salary	71,536	59	61,136
Data from NJDoE 2014 Taxpayers' Guide to Education Spending. *Of K-8 districts with 401-750 students. Lowest spending=1; Highest=64

The Rochelle Park Public School District is a community public school district that serves students in pre-kindergarten through eighth grade from Rochelle Park, in Bergen County, in the U.S. state of New Jersey.

As of the 2022–23 school year, the district, comprised of one school, had an enrollment of 502 students and 48.0 classroom teachers (on an FTE basis), for a student–teacher ratio of 10.5:1.

The district is classified by the New Jersey Department of Education as being in District Factor Group "FG", the fourth-highest of eight groupings. District Factor Groups organize districts statewide to allow comparison by common socioeconomic characteristics of the local districts. From lowest socioeconomic status to highest, the categories are A, B, CD, DE, FG, GH, I and J.

Students in public school for ninth through twelfth grades attend Hackensack High School in Hackensack, as part of a sending/receiving relationship with the Hackensack Public Schools, together with students from South Hackensack. As of the 2021–22 school year, the high school had an enrollment of 1,852 students and 130.3 classroom teachers (on an FTE basis), for a student–teacher ratio of 14.2:1.

== Schools ==
Midland School served 521 students in grades PreK-8 (as of the 2021–22 school year, per the National Center for Education Statistics)

- Courtney Carmichael, principal

== Administration ==
Core members of the district's administration are:

- Sue DeNobile, superintendent
- James Riley, business administrator and board secretary

== Board of education ==
The district's board of education, comprised of seven members, sets policy and oversees the fiscal and educational operation of the district through its administration. As a Type II school district, the board's trustees are elected directly by voters to serve three-year terms of office on a staggered basis, with either two three seats up for election each year held (since 2012) as part of the November general election. The board appoints a superintendent to oversee the district's day-to-day operations and a business administrator to supervise the business functions of the district.
