= Reino Nori =

American football player (1913–1988)

- Nori in 1936

No. 8, 4
- Positions: Quarterback, halfback

Personal information
- Born: February 26, 1913; DeKalb, Illinois
- Died: October 8, 1988 (aged 75); DeKalb, Illinois
- Listed height: 5 ft 7 in (1.70 m)
- Listed weight: 165 lb (75 kg)

Career information
- High school: DeKalb (DeKalb, Illinois)
- College: Northern Illinois

Career history
- Brooklyn Dodgers (1937); Chicago Bears (1938)

Career statistics
- Games played: 7
- Starts: 1

Reino Oscar Nori (February 26, 1913 – October 8, 1988) was an American football quarterback who played in the National Football League (NFL) for the Brooklyn Dodgers and Chicago Bears from 1937 to 1938. Standing just 5'7" tall and weighing about 150 pounds, Nori was among the smallest players of his era in the NFL.

Nori was a multi-sport collegiate star at Northern Illinois State Teachers College, earning 17 athletic letters and gaining induction into the Northern Illinois Athletic Hall of Fame.

== Biography ==
=== Early life ===
Reino Nori was born February 26, 1913 in DeKalb, Illinois. He was active in the Boy Scouts of America (BSA) as a boy. He attended DeKalb High School.

The 5'7" Reino Nori as a member of the Northern Illinois basketball team. Nori is in the second row at the far right.

He attended Northern Illinois State Teachers' College in DeKalb, where he was a multi-sport athlete, earning a total of 17 athletic letters in football, basketball. track and field, and wrestling. While at the school he gained the nickname "The Flying Finn."

Nori's 17 athletic letters earned at Northern Illinois stands as a school record and earned him election as one of the first members of the Northern Illinois University Athletic Hall of Fame.

Although the undersized Nori still managed to achieve All-Conference status as a guard on the North Illinois team during the 1935-36 season, it was on the football field that he made his greatest mark. Nori was an All-Conference halfback in 1932, 1934, and 1935 — finishing second in the nation in points scored with 102 as a senior. He scored a total of 204 points for the Huskies during his four year collegiate career.

=== Professional football career ===
In 1936, Nori was in camp with the Detroit Lions of the National Football League (NFL) — one of the smallest players to that date to play football in the league. He was briefly on the team's roster but on October 6, 1936, he was reassigned by head coach Potsy Clark to the Springfield Bicos, a Lion farm team in the newly organized Midwest Football League.

He had better success during the 1937 season, when he landed a place on the NFL's Brooklyn Dodgers. He appeared in a total of six games for the Dodgers, including one start. He finished the year going 11-for-23 passing (47.8% completion rate) for 168 yards and 1 touchdown, against 3 interceptions. He additionally rushed 26 times for 81 yards, a 3.1 yards per carry average.

He returned to the NFL for the 1938 season as a member of the Chicago Bears. Nori only saw action in a single game for the Bears in 1938, during which he ran the ball one time for one yard.

Nori's prospects for the 1939 season initially seemed better as he was one of only two veteran quarterbacks being brought into camp at St. John's Military Academy by head coach and team owner George Halas. Unfortunately for Nori, there were also twenty rookies reporting to camp, including several prospects to play under center. One of these was a highly-touted rookie out of Columbia University taken second overall by the Bears in the 1939 NFL draft — future Hall of Famer Sid Luckman. This marked the end of Nori's career in professional football.

=== Life after football ===
After his release by the Bears, Nori tried his hand at authorship, devising a new system for fans to score football games as they scored baseball games. His scorebook was to be manufactured by a local printer and was anticipated to be ready for sale in time for the opening of the 1940 football season.

Nori served in the US Army for three years and served overseas.

He later pursued a Master's degree, which he received from the University of Alabama. He was for many years a high school athletic coach in various school districts around Illinois.

=== Death and legacy ===
Nori died October 8, 1988, in DeKalb, Illinois.

Nori is a member of the Northern Illinois University Athletic Hall of Fame. His 17 athletic letters earned at the school still stands as a school record.
