= Myron Corp =

American promotional products company

Myron Promotional Products
- Type: Private
- Industry: Promotional Products
- Founded: Maywood, New Jersey, United States (1949; 77 years ago)
- Founder: Mike Adler, Elaine Adler
- Headquarters: Maywood, New Jersey, U.S.
- Area served: See listing
- Key people: Howard Wu (CEO), James Adler (Chairman)
- Services: See listing
- Number of employees: 1400

Myron Promotional Products is headquartered in Maywood, New Jersey and has seven sites worldwide in Canada, Germany, Honduras and China.

== History ==
Myron Corp. (Myron) was founded by Mike and Elaine Adler in 1949. After purchasing a sewing machine and one heat-sealing device, the Adlers started what is now a thriving mail-order business. Originally, Myron specialized in the imprinting and personalization of pocket calendars, pens, and a variety of business gifts.

In the 1950s Myron moved from its New York City location to a three-car garage in Englewood, New Jersey. With the help of a handful of employees, products were distributed to nearly 2,000 customers.

== Expansion ==
After the initial success, Myron moved from Englewood to Teaneck, where it remained for four years. In 1968, the business was transferred to a one-story building in Maywood, New Jersey which was later expanded to meet the needs of the growing organization. In 1980, work began on a new complex on Maywood Avenue, which was completed and occupied by 1982. This new facility contained more than 100,000 square feet of space.

Howard Wu is the current CEO, who joined in 2020 with extensive digital transformation experiences from companies like Zulily, Google, Amazon, T-Mobile and HTC.

== Services ==
Myron is a promotional products company, catering to customers in varying industries. Some examples include banks, non-profit organizations and educational groups.

The company offers a wide range of personalized promotional products for various events and occasions, including employee recognition, new customers and advertising, customer loyalty, corporate events, gifts for friends and family, and a holiday line including holiday cards and collectibles.

Myron's affiliated companies are known as Adler Business Gifts abroad and offer its products in 16 countries including the United States.
