= Hellah Sidibe =

American athlete

Hellah Sidibe is a runner, a former professional soccer player and has run across the United States. He is a run streaker, starting on May 15, 2017, and running every single day since then outdoors and for at least two miles.

== Background ==
Sidibe grew up in Mali playing soccer. He moved to America to join his parents who were studying in DeKalb, Illinois in 1998 and attended DeKalb High School. He then moved back to Mali one year later before returning to the United States in 2003. He played NCAA Division I soccer for the University of Massachusetts Amherst. He signed a professional soccer contract with the Kitsap Pumas in 2013 and played 11 games with the team.

== Running ==
In 2017 he set a running goal to run every day for two weeks. A resident of Rochelle Park, New Jersey, he soon decided that he could do this every day for his entire life and started documenting his daily runs on YouTube. In 2021, he ran across all of the United States. The run took him 84 days and 14 states from California to New York and he raised money for the non-profit called Soles4Souls. He has been widely interviewed about his journey to running and why he is a vegan.
