= Rochelle Park, New Jersey =

Township in Bergen County, New Jersey, US

- Township
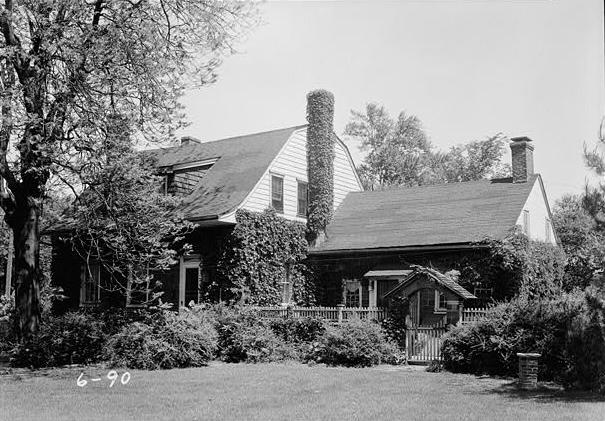
- Cornelius Demarest House

- Seal

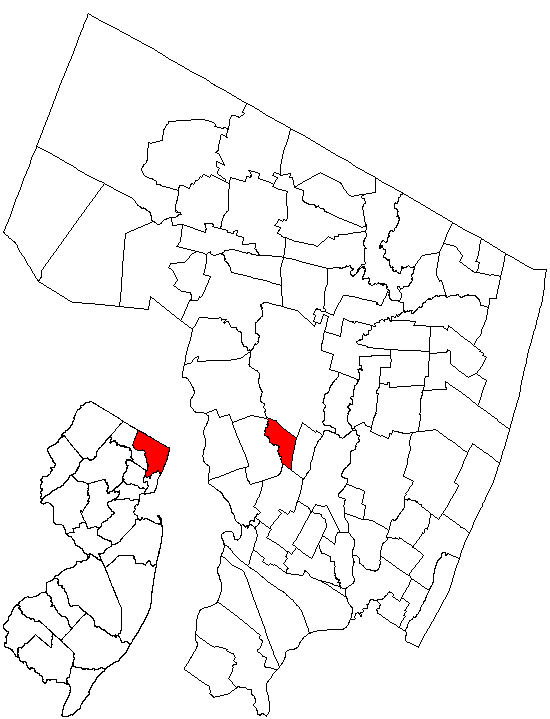
- Location of Rochelle Park in Bergen County highlighted in red (right). Inset map: Location of Bergen County in New Jersey highlighted in red (left).

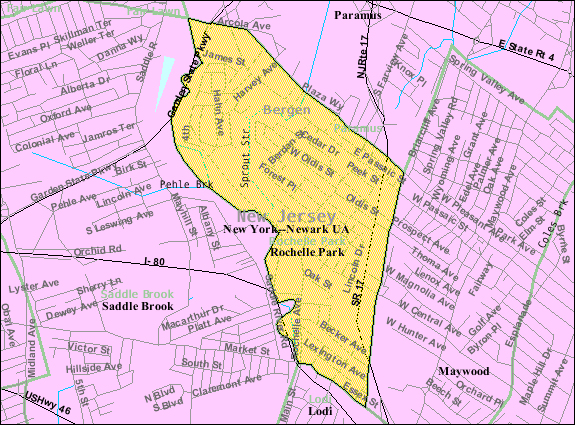
- Census Bureau map of Rochelle Park, New Jersey

- Location in Bergen County Location in New Jersey Location in the United States
- Coordinates: 40.906496°N 74.078005°W
- Country: United States
- State: New Jersey
- County: Bergen
- Incorporated: March 7, 1871 as Midland Township
- Reincorporated: November 5, 1929 as Rochelle Park
- Named for: La Rochelle, France

Government
  - Type: Township
  - Body: Township Committee
  - Mayor: Jen Appice (R, December 31, 2023)
  - Administrator: Dean M. Pinto
  - Municipal clerk: Annemarie Wells

Area
  - Total: 1.02 sq mi (2.65 km^{2})
  - Land: 0.99 sq mi (2.57 km^{2})
  - Water: 0.031 sq mi (0.08 km^{2}) 3.04%
  - Rank: 497th of 565 in state 65th of 70 in county
- Elevation: 59 ft (18 m)

Population (2020)
  - Total: 5,814
  - Estimate (2023): 5,833
  - Rank: 357th of 565 in state 57th of 70 in county
  - Density: 5,866.8/sq mi (2,265.2/km^{2})
  - Rank: 93rd of 565 in state 27th of 70 in county
- Time zone: UTC−05:00 (Eastern (EST))
  - Summer (DST): UTC−04:00 (Eastern (EDT))
- ZIP Code: 07662
- Area codes: 201 and 973
- FIPS code: 3400363990
- GNIS feature ID: 0882307
- Website: www.rochelleparknj.gov

Rochelle Park is a township in Bergen County, in the U.S. state of New Jersey. As of the 2020 United States census, the township's population was 5,814, an increase of 284 (+5.1%) from the 2010 census count of 5,530, which in turn reflected an increase of two people (+0.0%) from the 5,528 counted in the 2000 census.

What is now Rochelle Park was originally incorporated as Midland Township on March 7, 1871, from portions of New Barbadoes Township. Portions of the township were taken to form the boroughs of Delford (on March 8, 1894; now Oradell), Maywood (June 30, 1894), Riverside (also June 30, 1894; now River Edge) and Paramus (March 2, 1922). Rochelle Park was formed as a township by an act of the New Jersey Legislature on November 5, 1929, replacing Midland Township, based on the results of a referendum held on that same day that passed by a 503–69 margin. The main impetus behind the change in name was to avoid confusion with the nearby community of Midland Park. The township was named for the port city of La Rochelle, France.

== Geography ==
According to the United States Census Bureau, the township had a total area of 1.02 square miles (2.65 km^{2}), including 0.99 square miles (2.57 km^{2}) of land and 0.03 square miles (0.08 km^{2}) of water (3.04%).

The township borders the Bergen County municipalities of Fair Lawn, Lodi, Maywood, Paramus and Saddle Brook.

== Demographics ==
Historical population
| Census | Pop. | Note | %± |
|---|---|---|---|
| 1880 | 1,591 | | — |
| 1890 | 1,829 | | 15.0% |
| 1900 | 1,298 | * | −29.0% |
| 1910 | 1,480 | | 14.0% |
| 1920 | 2,203 | | 48.9% |
| 1930 | 1,768 | * | −19.7% |
| 1940 | 2,511 | | 42.0% |
| 1950 | 4,483 | | 78.5% |
| 1960 | 6,119 | | 36.5% |
| 1970 | 6,380 | | 4.3% |
| 1980 | 5,603 | | −12.2% |
| 1990 | 5,587 | | −0.3% |
| 2000 | 5,528 | | −1.1% |
| 2010 | 5,530 | | 0.0% |
| 2020 | 5,814 | | 5.1% |
| 2023 (est.) | 5,833 | | 0.3% |
Population sources: 1880–1920; 1880–1890 1890–1910; 1910–1930 1900–2020; 2000 2010 2020 * = Lost territory in previous decade.

=== 2020 census ===
Rochelle Park township, Bergen County, New Jersey – Racial and ethnic composition Note: the US Census treats Hispanic/Latino as an ethnic category. This table excludes Latinos from the racial categories and assigns them to a separate category. Hispanics/Latinos may be of any race.
| Race / Ethnicity (NH = Non-Hispanic) | Pop 2000 | Pop 2010 | Pop 2020 | % 2000 | % 2010 | % 2020 |
|---|---|---|---|---|---|---|
| White alone (NH) | 4,650 | 3,918 | 3,254 | 84.12% | 70.85% | 55.97% |
| Black or African American alone (NH) | 25 | 147 | 208 | 0.45% | 2.66% | 3.58% |
| Native American or Alaska Native alone (NH) | 1 | 6 | 3 | 0.02% | 0.11% | 0.05% |
| Asian alone (NH) | 327 | 481 | 602 | 5.92% | 8.70% | 10.35% |
| Native Hawaiian or Pacific Islander alone (NH) | 0 | 0 | 0 | 0.00% | 0.00% | 0.00% |
| Other race alone (NH) | 4 | 3 | 28 | 0.07% | 0.05% | 0.48% |
| Mixed race or Multiracial (NH) | 47 | 71 | 144 | 0.85% | 1.28% | 2.48% |
| Hispanic or Latino (any race) | 474 | 904 | 1,575 | 8.57% | 16.35% | 27.09% |
| Total | 5,528 | 5,530 | 5,814 | 100.00% | 100.00% | 100.00% |

=== 2010 census ===
The 2010 United States census counted 5,530 people, 2,087 households, and 1,455 families in the township. The population density was 5,313.8 per square mile (2,051.7/km^{2}). There were 2,170 housing units at an average density of 2,085.2 per square mile (805.1/km^{2}). The racial makeup was 82.22% (4,547) White, 2.89% (160) Black or African American, 0.25% (14) Native American, 8.72% (482) Asian, 0.00% (0) Pacific Islander, 3.89% (215) from other races, and 2.03% (112) from two or more races. Hispanic or Latino of any race were 16.35% (904) of the population.

Of the 2,087 households, 26.3% had children under the age of 18; 55.5% were married couples living together; 10.3% had a female householder with no husband present and 30.3% were non-families. Of all households, 26.1% were made up of individuals and 11.0% had someone living alone who was 65 years of age or older. The average household size was 2.54 and the average family size was 3.09.

18.2% of the population were under the age of 18, 6.5% from 18 to 24, 26.5% from 25 to 44, 28.9% from 45 to 64, and 19.9% who were 65 years of age or older. The median age was 44.2 years. For every 100 females, the population had 92.8 males. For every 100 females ages 18 and older there were 86.6 males.

The Census Bureau's 2006–2010 American Community Survey showed that (in 2010 inflation-adjusted dollars) median household income was $66,341 (with a margin of error of +/− $10,539) and the median family income was $81,113 (+/− $4,718). Males had a median income of $50,275 (+/− $2,954) versus $53,634 (+/− $11,176) for females. The per capita income for the township was $30,633 (+/− $2,836). About 2.8% of families and 4.7% of the population were below the poverty line, including 1.3% of those under age 18 and 5.0% of those age 65 or over.

Same-sex couples headed 14 households in 2010, an increase from the 12 counted in 2000.

=== 2000 census ===
As of the 2000 United States census there were 5,528 people, 2,061 households, and 1,393 families residing in the township. The population density was 5,287.7 inhabitants per square mile (2,041.6/km^{2}). There were 2,111 housing units at an average density of 2,019.2 per square mile (779.6/km^{2}). The racial makeup of the township was 90.09% White, 0.45% African American, 0.04% Native American, 6.02% Asian, 2.03% from other races, and 1.37% from two or more races. Hispanic or Latino of any race were 8.57% of the population.

There were 2,061 households, out of which 26.0% had children under the age of 18 living with them, 55.7% were married couples living together, 9.1% had a female householder with no husband present, and 32.4% were non-families. 27.3% of all households were made up of individuals, and 16.6% had someone living alone who was 65 years of age or older. The average household size was 2.52 and the average family size was 3.12.

In the township the population was spread out, with 18.7% under the age of 18, 5.9% from 18 to 24, 27.9% from 25 to 44, 23.7% from 45 to 64, and 23.9% who were 65 years of age or older. The median age was 43 years. For every 100 females, there were 84.1 males. For every 100 females age 18 and over, there were 79.2 males.

The median income for a household in the township was $60,818, and the median income for a family was $74,016. Males had a median income of $43,580 versus $36,827 for females. The per capita income for the township was $25,054. About 0.4% of families and 2.9% of the population were below the poverty line, including 2.2% of those under age 18 and 6.0% of those age 65 or over.

== Economy ==
Companies with headquarters in Rochelle Park include the specialty retailer United Retail Group, which is a publicly traded company on the New York Stock Exchange.

Garden State Plaza is located in Paramus, near the border of Rochelle Park.

== Government ==
=== Local government ===
Rochelle Park is governed under the Township form of New Jersey municipal government, one of 141 municipalities (of the 564) statewide that use this form, the second-most commonly used form of government in the state. The Township Committee is comprised of five members, who are elected directly by the voters at-large in partisan elections to serve three-year terms of office on a staggered basis, with either one or two seats coming up for election each year as part of the November general election in a three-year cycle. At an annual reorganization meeting, the Township Committee selects one of its members to serve as Mayor and another as Deputy Mayor.

As of 2026, the members of the Rochelle Park Township Committee are Mayor Thomas Miller (D, term on committee ends December 31, 2027, and term as mayor ends December 31, 2026), Deputy Mayor Matthew Trawinski (D, term on committee ends December 31, 2027, and term as deputy mayor ends December 31, 2026), Sean Smyth (D, 2028), Teresa E. Judge Cravello (D, 2026), and Jennifer Appice (R, 2026).

In June 2023, Perrin Mosca was removed from office as mayor in a controversy based on his opposition to the township's raising of the rainbow flag; Jen Appice was chosen to serve as mayor on an acting basis.

=== Federal, state, and county representation ===
Rochelle Park is located in the 9th Congressional District and is part of New Jersey's 38th state legislative district.

Prior to the 2011 reapportionment following the 2010 census, Rochelle Park had been in the 37th state legislative district. In redistricting following the 2010 census, the township was in the 5th congressional district, which was in effect from 2013 to 2022.

For the 119th United States Congress, New Jersey's 9th congressional district is represented by Nellie Pou (D, North Haledon) New Jersey is represented in the United States Senate by Democrats Cory Booker (Newark, term ends 2027) and Andy Kim (Moorestown, term ends 2031).

For the 2026–2027 session, the 38th legislative district of the New Jersey Legislature is represented in the State Senate by Joseph Lagana (D, Paramus) and in the General Assembly by Lisa Swain (D, Fair Lawn) and Chris Tully (D, Bergenfield).

Bergen County is governed by a directly elected County Executive, with legislative functions performed by a Board of County Commissioners comprised of seven members who are elected at-large to three-year terms in partisan elections on a staggered basis, with either two or three seats coming up for election each November; a Chairman and Vice Chairman are selected from among its seven members at a reorganization meeting held every January. As of 2025, the county executive is James J. Tedesco III (D, Paramus), whose four-year term of office ends December 31, 2026.

Bergen County's Commissioners are Chair Mary J. Amoroso (D, Mahwah, 2025), Vice Chair Steven A. Tanelli (D, North Arlington, 2027), Chair Pro Tem Joan Voss (D, Fort Lee, 2026), Rafael Marte (D, Bergenfield, 2026), Germaine M. Ortiz (D, Emerson, 2025), Thomas J. Sullivan Jr. (D, Montvale, 2025) and Tracy Silna Zur (D, Franklin Lakes, 2027).

Bergen County's elected constitutional officials are Clerk John S. Hogan (D, Northvale, 2026), Sheriff Anthony Cureton (D, Englewood, 2027) and Surrogate Michael R. Dressler (D, Cresskill, 2026).

=== Politics ===
United States presidential election results for Rochelle Park 2024 2020 2016 2012 2008 2004
| Year | Republican | | Democratic | | Third party(ies) | |
| Year | No. | % | No. | % | No. | % |
|---|---|---|---|---|---|---|
| 2024 | 1,592 | 52.40% | 1,390 | 45.75% | 56 | 1.84% |
| 2020 | 1,543 | 47.09% | 1,687 | 51.48% | 47 | 1.43% |
| 2016 | 1,426 | 51.07% | 1,291 | 46.24% | 75 | 2.69% |
| 2012 | 1,238 | 48.47% | 1,289 | 50.47% | 27 | 1.06% |
| 2008 | 1,398 | 51.36% | 1,304 | 47.91% | 20 | 0.73% |
| 2004 | 1,405 | 52.86% | 1,226 | 46.12% | 27 | 1.02% |

As of March 2011, there were a total of 3,376 registered voters in Rochelle Park Township, of which 895 (26.5% vs. 31.7% countywide) were registered as Democrats, 693 (20.5% vs. 21.1%) were registered as Republicans and 1,784 (52.8% vs. 47.1%) were registered as Unaffiliated. There were 4 voters registered as Libertarians or Greens. Among the township's 2010 Census population, 61.0% (vs. 57.1% in Bergen County) were registered to vote, including 74.6% of those ages 18 and over (vs. 73.7% countywide).

In the 2016 presidential election, Republican Donald Trump received 1,426 votes (50.8% vs. 41.1% countywide), ahead of Democrat Hillary Clinton with 1,291 votes (46.0% vs. 54.2%) and other candidates with 91 votes (3.2% vs. 4.6%), among the 2,852 ballots cast by the township's 3,842 registered voters, for a turnout of 74.2% (vs. 72.5% in Bergen County). In the 2012 presidential election, Democrat Barack Obama received 1,289 votes (50.0% vs. 54.8% countywide), ahead of Republican Mitt Romney with 1,238 votes (48.1% vs. 43.5%) and other candidates with 27 votes (1.0% vs. 0.9%), among the 2,576 ballots cast by the township's 3,518 registered voters, for a turnout of 73.2% (vs. 70.4% in Bergen County). In the 2008 presidential election, Republican John McCain received 1,398 votes (50.8% vs. 44.5% countywide), ahead of Democrat Barack Obama with 1,304 votes (47.4% vs. 53.9%) and other candidates with 20 votes (0.7% vs. 0.8%), among the 2,752 ballots cast by the township's 3,637 registered voters, for a turnout of 75.7% (vs. 76.8% in Bergen County). In the 2004 presidential election, Republican George W. Bush received 1,405 votes (52.6% vs. 47.2% countywide), ahead of Democrat John Kerry with 1,226 votes (45.9% vs. 51.7%) and other candidates with 27 votes (1.0% vs. 0.7%), among the 2,669 ballots cast by the township's 3,647 registered voters, for a turnout of 73.2% (vs. 76.9% in the whole county).

Gubernatorial election results for Rochelle Park
| Year | Republican | | Democratic | | Third party(ies) | |
| Year | No. | % | No. | % | No. | % |
|---|---|---|---|---|---|---|
| 2025 | 1,068 | 46.68% | 1,207 | 52.75% | 13 | 0.57% |
| 2021 | 1,016 | 53.84% | 855 | 45.31% | 16 | 0.85% |
| 2017 | 778 | 47.32% | 829 | 50.43% | 37 | 2.25% |
| 2013 | 1,027 | 63.67% | 566 | 35.09% | 20 | 1.24% |
| 2009 | 904 | 53.33% | 704 | 41.53% | 87 | 5.13% |
| 2005 | 691 | 43.73% | 849 | 53.73% | 40 | 2.53% |

In the 2013 gubernatorial election, Republican Chris Christie received 63.7% of the vote (1,027 cast), ahead of Democrat Barbara Buono with 35.1% (566 votes), and other candidates with 1.2% (20 votes), among the 1,675 ballots cast by the township's 3,460 registered voters (62 ballots were spoiled), for a turnout of 48.4%. In the 2009 gubernatorial election, Republican Chris Christie received 904 votes (52.8% vs. 45.8% countywide), ahead of Democrat Jon Corzine with 704 votes (41.1% vs. 48.0%), Independent Chris Daggett with 73 votes (4.3% vs. 4.7%) and other candidates with 14 votes (0.8% vs. 0.5%), among the 1,713 ballots cast by the township's 3,476 registered voters, yielding a 49.3% turnout (vs. 50.0% in the county).

United States Senate election results for Rochelle Park1
| Year | Republican | | Democratic | | Third party(ies) | |
| Year | No. | % | No. | % | No. | % |
|---|---|---|---|---|---|---|
| 2024 | 1,380 | 49.13% | 1,349 | 48.02% | 80 | 2.85% |
| 2018 | 1,095 | 47.86% | 1,128 | 49.30% | 65 | 2.84% |
| 2012 | 1,021 | 44.84% | 1,207 | 53.01% | 49 | 2.15% |
| 2006 | 863 | 51.34% | 792 | 47.11% | 26 | 1.55% |

United States Senate election results for Rochelle Park2
| Year | Republican | | Democratic | | Third party(ies) | |
| Year | No. | % | No. | % | No. | % |
|---|---|---|---|---|---|---|
| 2020 | 1,402 | 44.38% | 1,685 | 53.34% | 72 | 2.28% |
| 2014 | 599 | 47.92% | 631 | 50.48% | 20 | 1.60% |
| 2013 | 446 | 53.67% | 377 | 45.37% | 8 | 0.96% |
| 2008 | 1,150 | 48.34% | 1,206 | 50.69% | 23 | 0.97% |

== Education ==
The Rochelle Park School District serves public school students in pre-kindergarten through eighth grade at Midland School, which opened in 1926. As of the 2021–22 school year, the district, comprised of one school, had an enrollment of 528 students and 48.0 classroom teachers (on an FTE basis), for a student–teacher ratio of 11.0:1.

Students in public school for ninth through twelfth grades attend Hackensack High School in Hackensack, as part of a sending/receiving relationship with the Hackensack Public Schools, together with students from South Hackensack and, prior to the start of the 2020 school year, Maywood as well. As of the 2021–22 school year, the high school had an enrollment of 1,852 students and 130.3 classroom teachers (on an FTE basis), for a student–teacher ratio of 14.2:1. Rochelle Park is about 2.6 miles (4.2 km) from Hackensack High School which is about an eight-minute drive on average.

Public school students from the township, and all of Bergen County, are eligible to attend the secondary education programs offered by the Bergen County Technical Schools, which include the Bergen County Academies in Hackensack, and the Bergen Tech campus in Teterboro or Paramus. The district offers programs on a shared-time or full-time basis, with admission based on a selective application process and tuition covered by the student's home school district.

== Transportation ==
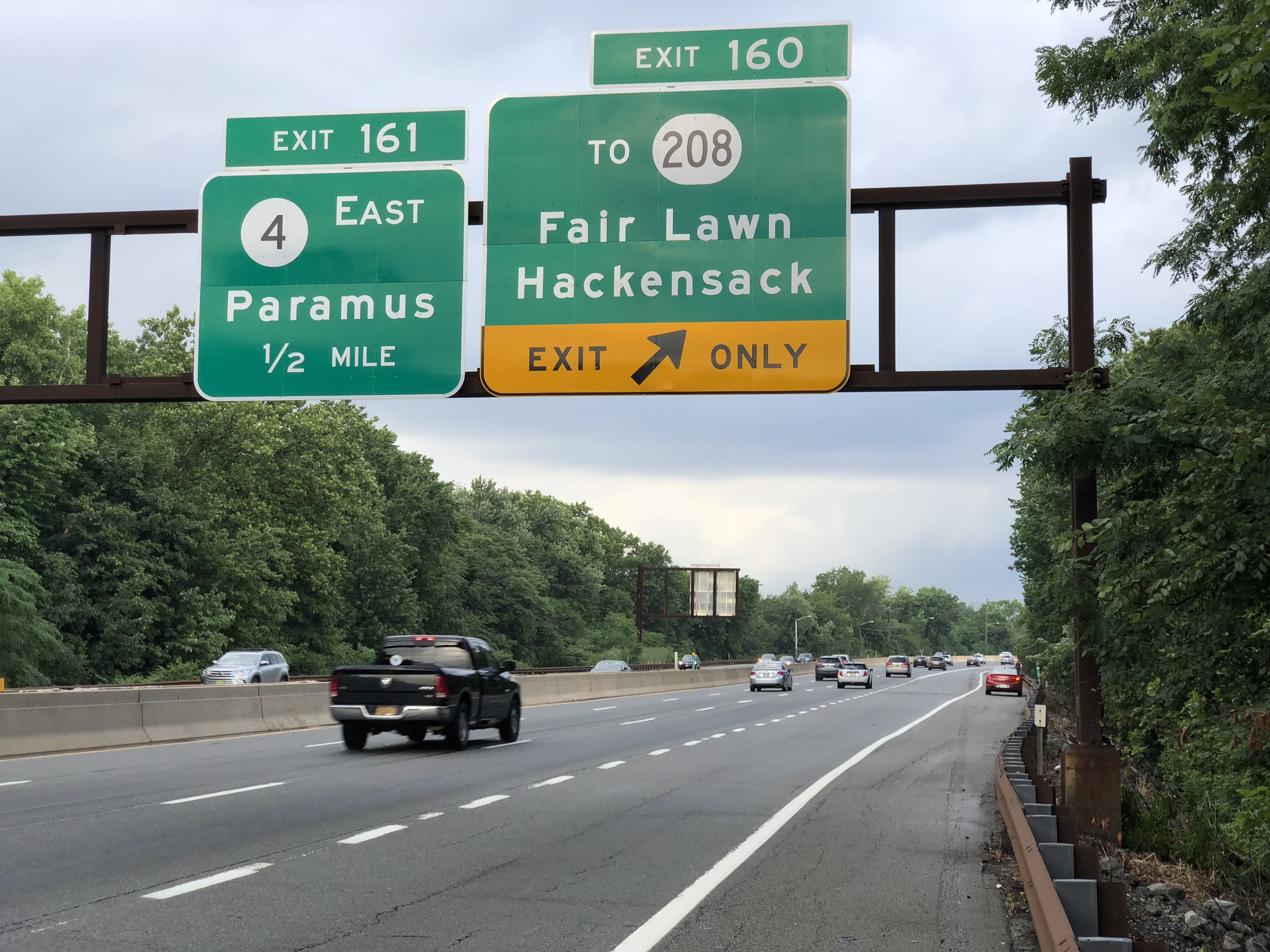
View north along the Garden State Parkway at Exit 160 in Rochelle Park

=== Roads and highways ===
As of May 2010, the township had a total of 18.16 miles (29.23 km) of roadways, of which 13.34 miles (21.47 km) were maintained by the municipality, 3.14 miles (5.05 km) by Bergen County, 1.05 miles (1.69 km) by the New Jersey Department of Transportation and 0.63 miles (1.01 km) by the New Jersey Turnpike Authority.

Route 17 and the Garden State Parkway travel through Rochelle Park. The Garden State Parkway crosses the northwest corner of the township, extending from Saddle Brook Township in the south for 0.6 miles (0.97 km) to Paramus. Route 17 extends for 1.0 mile (1.6 km) along the township's eastern border from Maywood to Paramus.

=== Public transportation ===
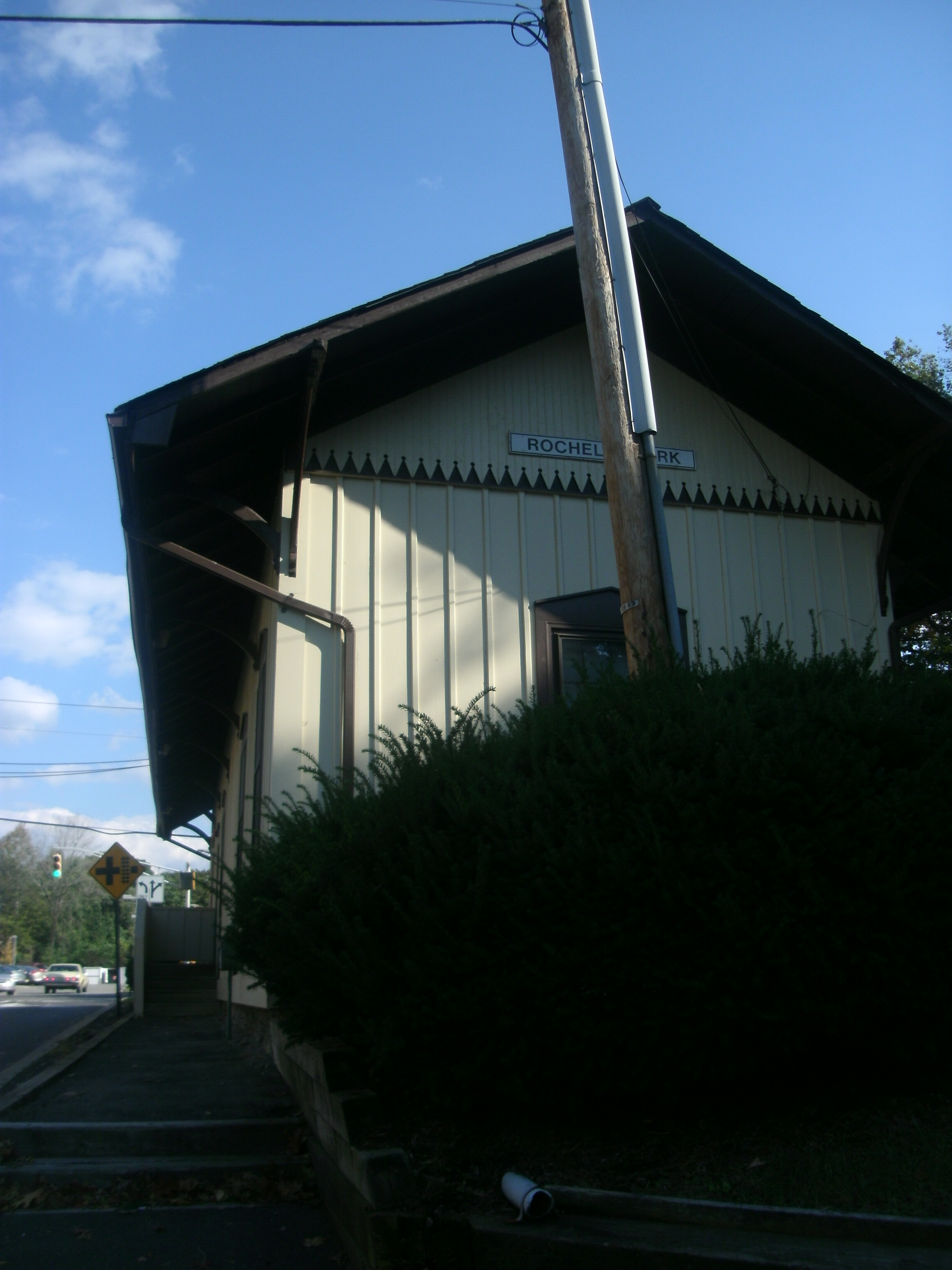
The former station for the New York, Susquehanna and Western Railroad in Rochelle Park.

NJ Transit provides bus service to and from the Port Authority Bus Terminal in Midtown Manhattan on the 144, 162, 163 and 164 routes, to the George Washington Bridge Bus Station on the 175 route, and local service on the 709, 712, 758, and 770 routes.

== Places of interest ==
The Cornelius Demarest House was added to the National Register of Historic Places in 1983, having been constructed between 1824 by 1826 by Samuel C. Demarest for his son.

The Captain William Tyson House, which was constructed by a wealthy 19th century ship owner from New York City, is a historic home constructed in the mid-1860s and stands as one of the few remaining uses of the late-19th century Italianate architectural style in Bergen County. One of Rochelle Park's oldest remaining structures, it was acquired by the township in 2015 for $600,000. Groups of residents have opposed the municipal expenditure of funds towards the acquisition and restoration of the 150-year-old building. The State Historic Preservation Office issued an opinion in 2002 indicating that the structure would be eligible for inclusion on the New Jersey register and the National Register of Historic Places; a Certification of Eligibility for the property was issued in 2015 that represents the next step towards inclusion on the state and national registers.

The Rochelle Park Area of Saddle River County Park offers a biking/jogging path, pavilion, tennis courts, basketball court, playground and softball field. The Rochelle Park area of the park can be accessed at Rail Road Avenue, Lotz Lane, and Howard Avenue.

The Rochelle Park Swim Club is a private club for members and their guests. The club is located on Lotz Lane.

== Notable people ==
People who were born in, residents of, or otherwise closely associated with Rochelle Park include:

- Jim Bouton (1939–2019), former MLB pitcher for the New York Yankees, Seattle Pilots, Houston Astros and Atlanta Braves, who authored the baseball memoir Ball Four
- Mychal Judge (1933–2001), Franciscan friar and Catholic priest at Sacred Heart in Rochelle Park who served as a chaplain to the New York City Fire Department in which capacity he was killed, becoming the first certified fatality of the September 11 terrorist attacks
- Andrew Kohut (1942–2015), pollster and nonpartisan news commentator about public affairs topics
- Fabri Salcedo (1914–1985), early soccer forward who was inducted into the National Soccer Hall of Fame
- Hellah Sidibe, former professional soccer player who was the first black person to run across the United States.

== Sources ==
- Municipal Incorporations of the State of New Jersey (according to Counties) prepared by the Division of Local Government, Department of the Treasury (New Jersey); December 1, 1958.
- Clayton, W. Woodford; and Nelson, William. History of Bergen and Passaic Counties, New Jersey, with Biographical Sketches of Many of its Pioneers and Prominent Men., Philadelphia: Everts and Peck, 1882.
- Harvey, Cornelius Burnham (ed.), Genealogical History of Hudson and Bergen Counties, New Jersey. New York: New Jersey Genealogical Publishing Co., 1900.
- Van Valen, James M. History of Bergen County, New Jersey. New York: New Jersey Publishing and Engraving Co., 1900.
- Westervelt, Frances A. (Frances Augusta), 1858–1942, History of Bergen County, New Jersey, 1630–1923, Lewis Historical Publishing Company, 1923.
