= Maywood Station Museum =

Museum in Maywood, New Jersey, U.S.

Maywood
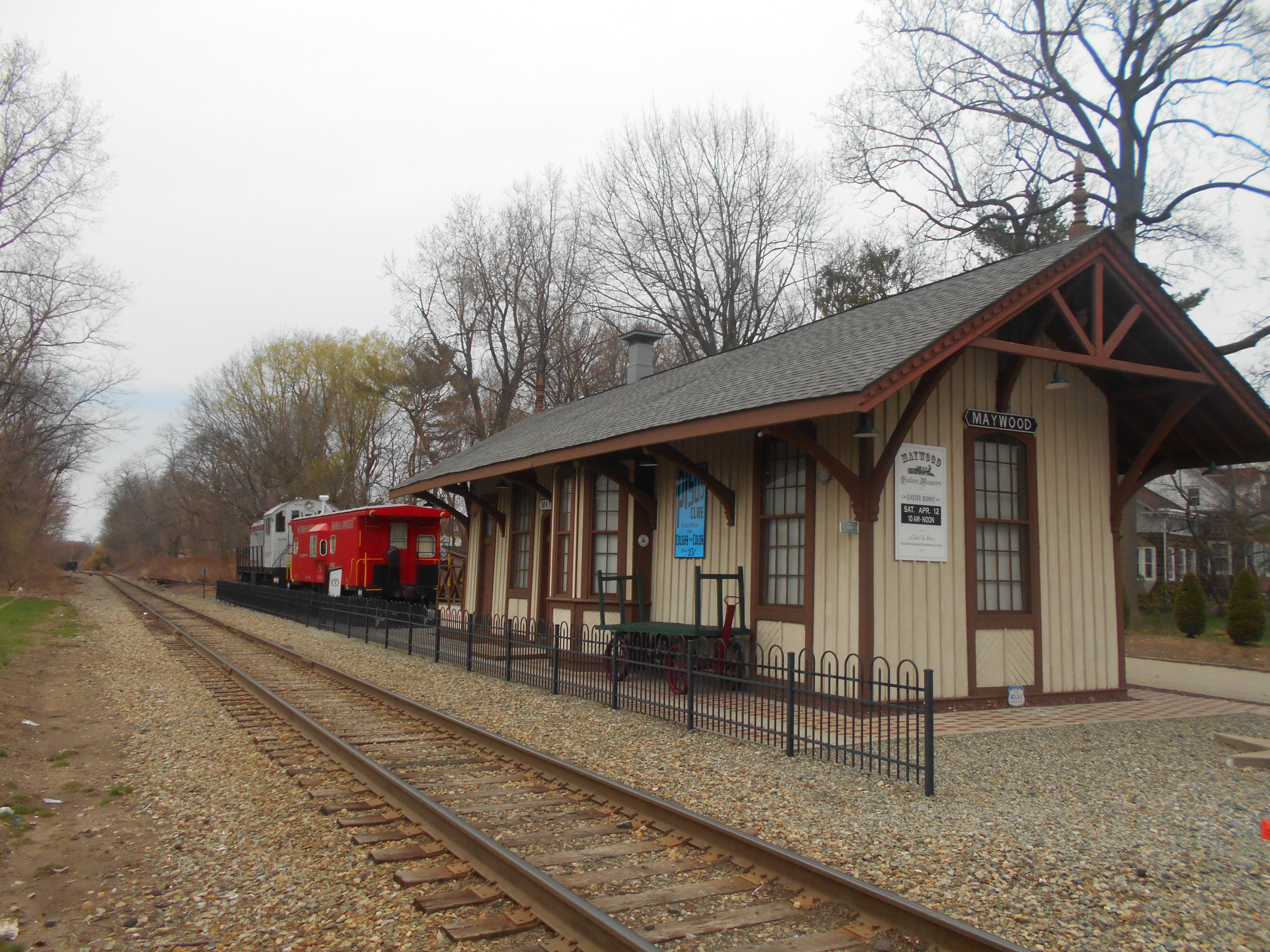
- Maywood station in April 2014, showing the museum, along with Locomotive No. 206 and the caboose stored there.

General information
- Location: 269 Maywood Avenue, Maywood, New Jersey
- Owner: New Jersey Midland Railway (1872–1896); New York, Susquehanna and Western Railroad (1896–1966); Maywood Station Historic Committee (2002–present)
- Lines: New York, Susquehanna and Western Railroad Main Line (until 1966)
- Platforms: 1 side platforms
- Tracks: 2 New York, Susquehanna and Western Railway

Construction
- Platform levels: 1

Other information
- Station code: 1093 (Erie); MW (NYS&W)

History
- Opened: 1872
- Closed: June 30, 1966
- Rebuilt: 2002 (restoration)
- Electrified: Not electrified

Services
Preceding station	New York, Susquehanna and Western Railroad	Following station
Rochelle Park toward Stroudsburg	Main Line	Prospect Avenue toward Susquehanna Transfer or Jersey City
- Maywood Railroad Station
- U.S. National Register of Historic Places
- New Jersey Register of Historic Places
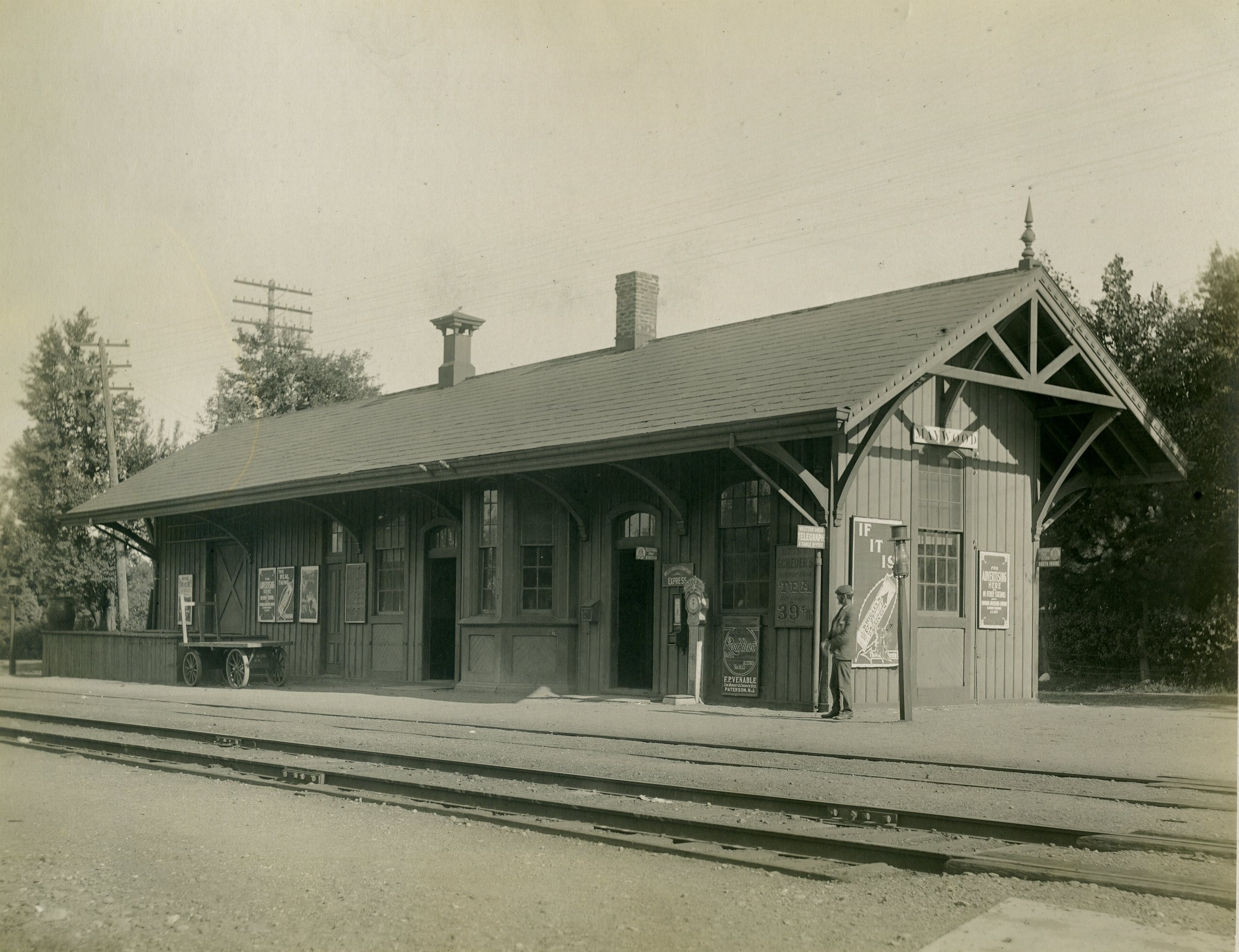
- Maywood station c. 1907–1912

- Location within Bergen County, New Jersey
- Location: Maywood, New Jersey
- Coordinates: 40°53′46″N 74°3′58″W
- Built: 1872
- Architectural style: Gothic
- NRHP reference No.: 03000487
- NJRHP No.: 4016

Significant dates
- Added to NRHP: May 29, 2003
- Designated NJRHP: February 18, 2003
Location

The Maywood Station Museum is located in the 1872-built New York, Susquehanna and Western Railway station in Maywood, New Jersey, United States.

== History ==
The station underwent an extensive restoration by the volunteer, 501(c)3 non-profit Maywood Station Historical Committee beginning in July 2002 and officially opened as a museum in September 2004. Maywood Station is listed on the New Jersey Register of Historical Places, and was added to the National Register of Historic Places in 2003 (as Building #03000487).

== Museum ==
The museum is open to the public periodically throughout the year. It is also open by appointment for class trips, Boy and Girl Scouts trips, senior citizen trips and for other organizations and clubs as well as can be contracted for movie and television filming, commercial props, photo shoots, etc.

The museum is operated and staffed by the volunteer membership of the Maywood Station Historical Committee. The main focus of the museum is concentrated on the history of Maywood Station and the New York, Susquehanna & Western Railroad and the roles they played in the development of the Borough of Maywood and the surrounding area. The museum collection contains hundreds of photographs, displays, documents, maps and artifacts covering the histories of Maywood Station, the NYS&W and local railroads, the Borough of Maywood, and the local region, which are changed periodically and designed to entertain and educate visitors of all ages as well as offer a virtual timeline to these subjects. Maywood Station Museum is also the official site of the New York, Susquehanna & Western Technical & Historical Society's archive, which contains thousands of drawings, maps, track diagrams, photos, timetables, documents and records covering the history of the New York, Susquehanna & Western Railroad.

The museum features the original woodwork painted and stained in its original colors and original Maywood Station furnishings have been restored and displayed such as the potbelly stove, station agent's desk, chairs, telegraph keys and freight scale. Victorian-period original light fixtures and sconces adorn the ceilings and walls. Additional items have been painstakingly reproduced to the exact original specifications of over one-hundred years ago including the station benches and bay window area.

The Maywood Station Museum collection includes a former Penn Central/Conrail N-12 class caboose, which was restored by Maywood Station Historical Committee members. Visitors to the Maywood Station Museum are invited to come aboard Caboose 24542 and view additional displays and an operating model train layout. The Maywood Station Museum collection also includes original New York, Susquehanna & Western Railroad ALCO Type S-2 Locomotive #206, which has also been restored by Maywood Station Historical Committee members. On September 10, 2009, NYS&W S-2 #206 was placed on the State of New Jersey Register of Historical Places. The locomotive was placed onto the National Register of Historical Places on March 19, 2010.

== New station ==
A location nearby the museum is a potential station of NJ Transit's proposed Passaic–Bergen–Hudson Transit Project which would be called Maywood Avenue.

== See also ==
- National Register of Historic Places listings in Bergen County, New Jersey
- NYSW (passenger 1939–1966) map
- Passaic-Bergen-Hudson Transit map
- Operating Passenger Railroad Stations Thematic Resource (New Jersey)

== Bibliography ==
- Carlough, Curtis V.; Fredericks, Harold; Stuy, Timothy; Van Dyk, Fred (1999). The Next Station Will Be... Volume 1 (Revised). New Jersey Midland Railroad Historical Society, Inc. ISBN 9780941652155.
