= Midland Township, New Jersey =

Township in Bergen County, New Jersey (1871–1929)

Coordinates: 40.910°N 74.078°W

Historical population
Census	Pop.	Note	%±
1900	1,298		—
1910	1,480		14.0%
1920	2,203		48.9%

Midland Township was a township in Bergen County, New Jersey, in the United States, that was formed on March 7, 1871, from portions of New Barbadoes Township.

== History ==
Midland Township was hit hard by "Boroughitis" in 1894, when three boroughs were formed from portions of the township (and other townships, as indicated): Delford (March 8, 1894; also included portions of Palisades Township; name changed to Oradell in 1920), Maywood (June 30, 1894) and Riverside (June 30, 1894; name changed to River Edge in 1930). Paramus left the fold on April 4, 1922.

On November 5, 1929, the remnants of Midland Township became Rochelle Park.
