= Maywood, New Jersey =

Borough in Bergen County, New Jersey, US

- Borough
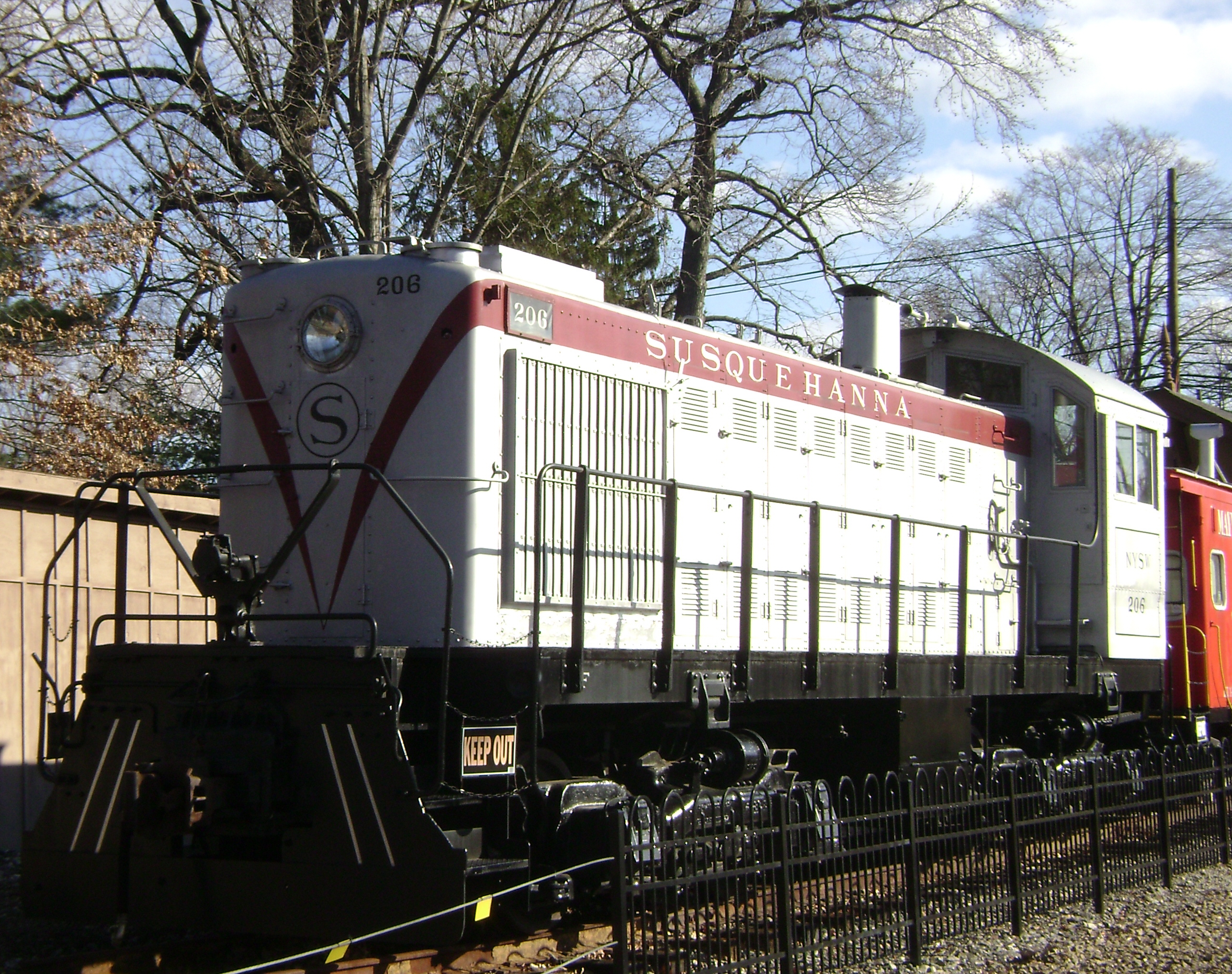
- NYS&W diesel locomotive No. 206 on static display at the Maywood Station Museum

- Seal

- Location of Maywood in Bergen County highlighted in red (left). Inset map: Location of Bergen County in New Jersey highlighted in orange (right).

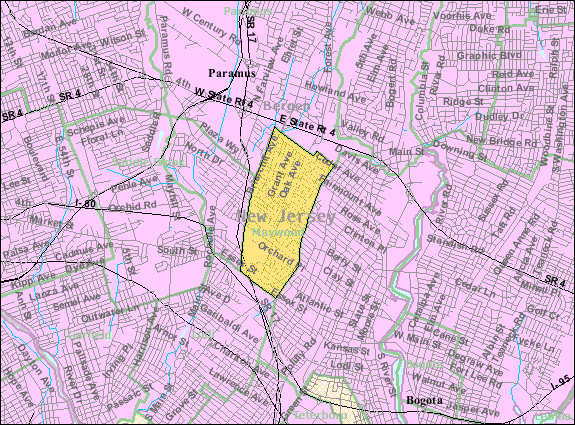
- Census Bureau map of Maywood, New Jersey

- Location in Bergen County Location in New Jersey Location in the United States
- Coordinates: 40.902885°N 74.063457°W
- Country: United States
- State: New Jersey
- County: Bergen
- Incorporated: June 29, 1894

Government
  - Type: Borough
  - Body: Borough Council
  - Mayor: Richard Bolan (D, term ends December 31, 2023)
  - Administrator: Adrian Febre
  - Municipal clerk: Barbara L. Dispoto

Area
  - Total: 1.29 sq mi (3.34 km^{2})
  - Land: 1.29 sq mi (3.33 km^{2})
  - Water: 0.0039 sq mi (0.01 km^{2}) 0.16%
  - Rank: 471st of 565 in state 59th of 70 in county
- Elevation: 89 ft (27 m)

Population (2020)
  - Total: 10,080
  - Estimate (2023): 10,023
  - Rank: 242nd of 565 in state 38th of 70 in county
  - Density: 7,832.2/sq mi (3,024.0/km^{2})
  - Rank: 54th of 565 in state 16th of 70 in county
- Time zone: UTC−05:00 (Eastern (EST))
  - Summer (DST): UTC−04:00 (Eastern (EDT))
- ZIP Code: 07607
- Area code: 201
- FIPS code: 3400344880
- GNIS feature ID: 0885294
- Website: maywoodnj.com

Maywood is a borough in Bergen County, in the U.S. state of New Jersey. As of the 2020 United States census, the borough's population was 10,080, an increase of 525 (+5.5%) from the 2010 census count of 9,555, which in turn reflected an increase of 32 (+0.3%) from the 9,523 counted in the 2000 census.

Maywood was incorporated as a borough on June 29, 1894, from portions of Midland Township, based on the results of a referendum held that day. The borough was formed during the "Boroughitis" phenomenon then sweeping through Bergen County, in which 26 boroughs were formed in the county in 1894 alone. The borough's name came from the name of a station established in the area by the New Jersey Midland Railroad.

== Geography ==
According to the United States Census Bureau, the borough had a total area of 1.29 square miles (3.34 km^{2}), including 1.29 square miles (3.33 km^{2}) of land and <0.01 square miles (0.01 km^{2}) of water (0.16%).

The borough borders the Bergen County municipalities of Hackensack, Lodi, Paramus and Rochelle Park.

== Demographics ==
Historical population
Census	Pop.	Note	%±
1900	536		—
1910	889		65.9%
1920	1,618		82.0%
1930	3,398		110.0%
1940	4,052		19.2%
1950	8,667		113.9%
1960	11,460		32.2%
1970	11,087		−3.3%
1980	9,895		−10.8%
1990	9,473		−4.3%
2000	9,523		0.5%
2010	9,555		0.3%
2020	10,080		5.5%
2023 (est.)	10,023	▼	−0.6%
Population sources: 1900–1920 1900–1910; 1910–1930 1900–2020; 2000 2010 2020

=== Racial and ethnic composition ===
Maywood borough, New Jersey – Racial and ethnic composition Note: the US Census treats Hispanic/Latino as an ethnic category. This table excludes Latinos from the racial categories and assigns them to a separate category. Hispanics/Latinos may be of any race.
Race / Ethnicity (NH = Non-Hispanic)	Pop 2000	Pop 2010	Pop 2020	% 2000	% 2010	% 2020
White alone (NH)	7,330	6,081	5,143	76.97%	63.64%	51.02%
Black or African American alone (NH)	247	460	605	2.59%	4.81%	6.00%
Native American or Alaska Native alone (NH)	5	5	32	0.05%	0.05%	0.32%
Asian alone (NH)	679	1,042	1,442	7.13%	10.91%	14.31%
Native Hawaiian or Pacific Islander alone (NH)	0	2	1	0.00%	0.02%	0.01%
Other race alone (NH)	25	42	63	0.26%	0.44%	0.63%
Mixed race or Multiracial (NH)	122	138	227	1.28%	1.44%	2.25%
Hispanic or Latino (any race)	1,115	1,785	2,567	11.71%	18.68%	25.47%
Total	9,523	9,555	10,080	100.00%	100.00%	100.00%

=== 2020 census ===
As of the 2020 census, Maywood had a population of 10,080. The median age was 43.3 years. 19.8% of residents were under the age of 18 and 19.7% of residents were 65 years of age or older. For every 100 females there were 91.3 males, and for every 100 females age 18 and over there were 88.0 males age 18 and over.

100.0% of residents lived in urban areas, while 0.0% lived in rural areas.

There were 3,717 households in Maywood, of which 31.7% had children under the age of 18 living in them. Of all households, 55.0% were married-couple households, 14.0% were households with a male householder and no spouse or partner present, and 26.2% were households with a female householder and no spouse or partner present. About 22.8% of all households were made up of individuals and 11.6% had someone living alone who was 65 years of age or older.

There were 3,829 housing units, of which 2.9% were vacant. The homeowner vacancy rate was 1.1% and the rental vacancy rate was 3.1%.

=== 2010 census ===
The 2010 United States census counted 9,555 people, 3,649 households, and 2,591 families in the borough. The population density was 7,428.0 per square mile (2,868.0/km^{2}). There were 3,769 housing units at an average density of 2,930.0 per square mile (1,131.3/km^{2}). The racial makeup was 74.78% (7,145) White, 5.34% (510) Black or African American, 0.18% (17) Native American, 10.98% (1,049) Asian, 0.02% (2) Pacific Islander, 6.16% (589) from other races, and 2.54% (243) from two or more races. Hispanic or Latino of any race were 18.68% (1,785) of the population.

Of the 3,649 households, 29.7% had children under the age of 18; 55.4% were married couples living together; 12.1% had a female householder with no husband present and 29.0% were non-families. Of all households, 24.0% were made up of individuals and 11.8% had someone living alone who was 65 years of age or older. The average household size was 2.61 and the average family size was 3.14.

21.0% of the population were under the age of 18, 6.6% from 18 to 24, 27.2% from 25 to 44, 29.5% from 45 to 64, and 15.7% who were 65 years of age or older. The median age was 41.7 years. For every 100 females, the population had 90.4 males. For every 100 females ages 18 and older there were 87.6 males.

The Census Bureau's 2006–2010 American Community Survey showed that (in 2010 inflation-adjusted dollars) median household income was $82,792 (with a margin of error of +/− $3,759) and the median family income was $97,776 (+/− $5,312). Males had a median income of $62,450 (+/− $4,738) versus $54,471 (+/− $7,2865) for females. The per capita income for the borough was $36,461 (+/− $2,475). About 3.4% of families and 4.8% of the population were below the poverty line, including 5.9% of those under age 18 and 3.2% of those age 65 or over.

Same-sex couples headed 32 households in 2010, an increase from the 24 counted in 2000.

=== 2000 census ===
As of the 2000 United States census there were 9,523 people, 3,710 households, and 2,626 families residing in the borough. The population density was 7,326.2 inhabitants per square mile (2,828.7/km^{2}). There were 3,777 housing units at an average density of 2,905.7 per square mile (1,121.9/km^{2}). The racial makeup of the borough was 84.57% White, 2.79% African American, 0.07% Native American, 7.16% Asian, 0.01% Pacific Islander, 3.31% from other races, and 2.08% from two or more races. Hispanic or Latino of any race were 11.71% of the population.

There were 3,710 households, out of which 29.1% had children under the age of 18 living with them, 56.3% were married couples living together, 11.0% had a female householder with no husband present, and 29.2% were non-families. 24.9% of all households were made up of individuals, and 13.3% had someone living alone who was 65 years of age or older. The average household size was 2.56 and the average family size was 3.09.

In the borough the population was spread out, with 21.1% under the age of 18, 6.2% from 18 to 24, 30.8% from 25 to 44, 24.4% from 45 to 64, and 17.5% who were 65 years of age or older. The median age was 40 years. For every 100 females, there were 86.9 males. For every 100 females age 18 and over, there were 83.5 males.

The median income for a household in the borough was $62,113, and the median income for a family was $73,419. Males had a median income of $49,566 versus $38,193 for females. The per capita income for the borough was $28,117. About 2.5% of families and 3.3% of the population were below the poverty line, including 4.6% of those under age 18 and 3.3% of those age 65 or over.

== Economy ==
The central business district of the borough is located on West Pleasant Avenue from the intersection of Maywood Avenue to Lincoln Avenue, and is where most of the local restaurants and shops reside. The business district of Maywood was renovated through a "Streetscapes" grant used to fix up the sidewalks, streets and lighting.

Bergen Town Center, formerly known as the Bergen Mall, is primarily located in Paramus, with portions of the mall in Maywood.

Coca-Cola uses a coca leaf extract prepared by a Stepan Company plant in Maywood as an ingredient. The facility, which had been known as the Maywood Chemical Works (and is also a known Superfund site), was purchased by Stepan in 1959. The plant is the only commercial entity in the country authorized by the Drug Enforcement Administration to import coca leaves, which come primarily from Peru. The non-narcotic extract is sold to Coke, while the active ingredient is sold to a pharmaceutical firm for medicinal purposes.

Fake Chapter Records is an independent record label that was founded by Michael Gilligan in 1996.

Myron Corp, a manufacturer of personalized business gifts, is headquartered in Maywood.

== Parks and recreation ==
Maywood's Memorial Park is across the street from Memorial School on Grant Avenue and is open to the public. The park includes multiple baseball fields and a vast open field for soccer, football, running, etc. Further back is a multi-hoop concrete basketball court; a small, fenced in dog park; and two jungle gyms with swings. Around the circumference of the park is a 1/2-mile long bike path.

== Government ==
=== Local government ===
Maywood is governed under the borough form of New Jersey municipal government, which is used in 218 municipalities (of the 564) statewide, making it the most common form of government in New Jersey. The governing body is composed of a mayor and a borough council, with all positions elected at-large on a partisan basis as part of the November general election. A mayor is elected directly by the voters to a four-year term of office. The borough council includes six members elected to serve three-year terms on a staggered basis, with two seats coming up for election each year in a three-year cycle. The borough form of government used by Maywood is a "weak mayor / strong council" government in which council members act as the legislative body with the mayor presiding at meetings and voting only in the event of a tie. The mayor can veto ordinances subject to an override by a two-thirds majority vote of the council. The mayor makes committee and liaison assignments for council members, and most appointments are made by the mayor with the advice and consent of the council.

As of 2023, the mayor of Maywood is Democrat Richard Bolan, serving a term of office ending December 31, 2023. Members of the Borough Council are Council President Jacqueline S. DeMuro (D, 2025), Danyel Cicarelli (R, 2024), Samuel Conoscenti (R, 2024), Jacqueline Flynn (D, 2025), Louis D. Roer (D, 2023) and Ryan P. Ullman (D, 2023).

In January 2020, Douglas Herrick was appointed to fill an unexpired term ending in December 2021 that had been held by Richard Bolan until he resigned from his council seat to assume the mayoralty. Louis Roer was also appointed to fill an unexpired term ending in December 2020.

=== Federal, state, and county representation ===
Maywood is located in the 5th and 9th Congressional Districts and is part of New Jersey's 38th state legislative district.

For the 119th United States Congress, New Jersey's 5th congressional district is represented by Josh Gottheimer (D, Wyckoff). For the 119th United States Congress, New Jersey's 9th congressional district is represented by Nellie Pou (D, North Haledon) New Jersey is represented in the United States Senate by Democrats Cory Booker (Newark, term ends 2027) and Andy Kim (Moorestown, term ends 2031).

For the 2026–2027 session, the 38th legislative district of the New Jersey Legislature is represented in the State Senate by Joseph Lagana (D, Paramus) and in the General Assembly by Lisa Swain (D, Fair Lawn) and Chris Tully (D, Bergenfield).

Bergen County is governed by a directly elected County Executive, with legislative functions performed by a Board of County Commissioners comprised of seven members who are elected at-large to three-year terms in partisan elections on a staggered basis, with either two or three seats coming up for election each November; a Chairman and Vice Chairman are selected from among its seven members at a reorganization meeting held every January. As of 2025, the county executive is James J. Tedesco III (D, Paramus), whose four-year term of office ends December 31, 2026.

Bergen County's Commissioners are Chair Mary J. Amoroso (D, Mahwah, 2025), Vice Chair Steven A. Tanelli (D, North Arlington, 2027), Chair Pro Tem Joan Voss (D, Fort Lee, 2026), Rafael Marte (D, Bergenfield, 2026), Germaine M. Ortiz (D, Emerson, 2025), Thomas J. Sullivan Jr. (D, Montvale, 2025) and Tracy Silna Zur (D, Franklin Lakes, 2027).

Bergen County's elected constitutional officials are Clerk John S. Hogan (D, Northvale, 2026), Sheriff Anthony Cureton (D, Englewood, 2027) and Surrogate Michael R. Dressler (D, Cresskill, 2026).

=== Politics ===
As of March 2011, there were a total of 5,711 registered voters in Maywood, of which 1,872 (32.8% vs. 31.7% countywide) were registered as Democrats, 1,066 (18.7% vs. 21.1%) were registered as Republicans and 2,767 (48.5% vs. 47.1%) were registered as Unaffiliated. There were 6 voters registered as Libertarians or Greens. Among the borough's 2010 Census population, 59.8% (vs. 57.1% in Bergen County) were registered to vote, including 75.7% of those ages 18 and over (vs. 73.7% countywide).

Gubernatorial election results for Maywood
Year	Republican		Democratic		Third party(ies)	
Year	No.	%	No.	%	No.	%
2025	1,540	40.45%	2,243	58.92%	24	0.63%
2021	1,338	43.78%	1,702	55.69%	16	0.52%
2017	993	41.02%	1,379	56.96%	49	2.02%
2013	1,708	61.02%	1,052	37.58%	39	1.39%
2009	1,340	46.48%	1,352	46.90%	191	6.63%
2005	1,231	43.31%	1,524	53.62%	87	3.06%

In the 2016 presidential election, Democrat Hillary Clinton received 2,476 votes (53.8% vs. 54.2% countywide), ahead of Republican Donald Trump with 1,696 votes (42.8% vs. 41.1%) and other candidates with 157 votes (3.4% vs. 4.6%), among the 4,660 ballots cast by the borough's 6,309 registered voters, for a turnout of 73.4% (vs. 72.5% in Bergen County). In the 2012 presidential election, Democrat Barack Obama received 2,513 votes (56.3% vs. 54.8% countywide), ahead of Republican Mitt Romney with 1,877 votes (42.1% vs. 43.5%) and other candidates with 47 votes (1.1% vs. 0.9%), among the 4,462 ballots cast by the borough's 6,047 registered voters, for a turnout of 73.8% (vs. 70.4% in Bergen County). In the 2008 presidential election, Democrat Barack Obama received 2,564 votes (54.0% vs. 53.9% countywide), ahead of Republican John McCain with 2,087 votes (43.9% vs. 44.5%) and other candidates with 49 votes (1.0% vs. 0.8%), among the 4,752 ballots cast by the borough's 5,992 registered voters, for a turnout of 79.3% (vs. 76.8% in Bergen County). In the 2004 presidential election, Democrat John Kerry received 2,293 votes (50.5% vs. 51.7% countywide), ahead of Republican George W. Bush with 2,184 votes (48.1% vs. 47.2%) and other candidates with 43 votes (0.9% vs. 0.7%), among the 4,540 ballots cast by the borough's 5,752 registered voters, for a turnout of 78.9% (vs. 76.9% in the whole county).

Presidential elections results
Year	Republican	Democratic
2024	44.8% 2,235	52.7% 2,629
2020	39.4% 2,138	58.9% 3,193
2016	42.8% 1,696	53.8% 2,476
2012	42.1% 1,877	56.3% 2,513
2008	43.9% 2,087	54.0% 2,564
2004	48.1% 2,184	50.5% 2,293

In the 2013 gubernatorial election, Republican Chris Christie received 61.0% of the vote (1,708 cast), ahead of Democrat Barbara Buono with 37.6% (1,052 votes), and other candidates with 1.4% (39 votes), among the 2,898 ballots cast by the borough's 5,850 registered voters (99 ballots were spoiled), for a turnout of 49.5%. In the 2009 gubernatorial election, Democrat Jon Corzine received 1,352 ballots cast (46.4% vs. 48.0% countywide), ahead of Republican Chris Christie with 1,340 votes (46.0% vs. 45.8%), Independent Chris Daggett with 165 votes (5.7% vs. 4.7%) and other candidates with 26 votes (0.9% vs. 0.5%), among the 2,911 ballots cast by the borough's 5,850 registered voters, yielding a 49.8% turnout (vs. 50.0% in the county).

United States Senate election results for Maywood1
Year	Republican		Democratic		Third party(ies)	
Year	No.	%	No.	%	No.	%
2024	2,044	43.41%	2,565	54.47%	100	2.12%
2018	1,450	42.76%	1,849	54.53%	92	2.71%
2012	1,629	39.70%	2,404	58.59%	70	1.71%
2006	1,235	44.80%	1,474	53.46%	48	1.74%

United States Senate election results for Maywood2
Year	Republican		Democratic		Third party(ies)	
Year	No.	%	No.	%	No.	%
2020	2,023	38.21%	3,188	60.21%	84	1.59%
2014	1,013	41.72%	1,381	56.88%	34	1.40%
2013	750	45.26%	889	53.65%	18	1.09%
2008	1,757	41.02%	2,467	57.60%	59	1.38%

== Education ==
The Maywood Public Schools serve students in pre-kindergarten through eighth grade. As of the 2021–22 school year, the district, comprised of two schools, had an enrollment of 934 students and 82.0 classroom teachers (on an FTE basis), for a student–teacher ratio of 11.4:1. Schools in the district (with 2021–22 enrollment from the National Center for Education Statistics) are Memorial School with 413 students in grades PreK-3 and Maywood Avenue School with 515 students in grades 4-8.

The district offers a wide variety of after school activities ranging from cheerleading to chess club, and where all students have the opportunity to contribute to their school newspaper, The Hawk (Grades 6–8), and the school's new newspaper, The Mini Hawk (Grades 4 and 5), and eighth graders may assist with their yearbook. For the 1996–1997 school year, Memorial School was formally recognized with the National Blue Ribbon School Award of Excellence, the highest honor that an American school can achieve.

For many years, after graduating from Maywood Avenue School, students in public school for ninth through twelfth grades had attended Hackensack High School in Hackensack, as part of a sending/receiving relationship with the Hackensack Public Schools, together with students from Rochelle Park and South Hackensack. Before that, they had been a sending district to Bogota High School. In March 2020, the district received approval from the New Jersey Department of Education to end the relationship it had established with Hackensack in 1969 and will begin transitioning incoming ninth graders to Henry P. Becton Regional High School, which serves students from Carlstadt and East Rutherford, beginning in the 2020–2021 school year. The transition would be complete after the final group of twelfth graders graduates from Hackensack High School at the end of the 2023–2024 school year. As of the 2021–22 school year, the high school had an enrollment of 653 students and 51.1 classroom teachers (on an FTE basis), for a student–teacher ratio of 12.8:1.

Public school students from the borough, and all of Bergen County, are eligible to attend the secondary education programs offered by the Bergen County Technical Schools, which include the Bergen County Academies in Hackensack, and the Bergen Tech campus in Teterboro or Paramus. The district offers programs on a shared-time or full-time basis, with admission based on a selective application process and tuition covered by the student's home school district.

== Emergency services ==
The Maywood Police Department has been serving the community since 1894 and has a force of 22 sworn officers. Maywood Police Communications is staffed by certified EMD Telecommunicators who handle all local 9-1-1 emergency calls and dispatches all emergency services. Maywood also has sworn Class 1 Special Law Enforcement Officers who assist with traffic control and park patrols.

After the Maywood First Aid and Emergency Squad closed in 2017, the borough sought to identify a provider to provide alternate coverage. Residents receive emergency medical services under a contractual agreement with Hackensack University Medical Center.

Maywood has an all-volunteer fire department. There are two fire stations in Maywood. Station 1 (T17-E18) is located on Park Avenue and Station 2 (E19-R23) is located on West Hunter Avenue. Maywood also houses a Fire Police department that was founded in 1926. The Fire Police assist both fire and police departments.

== Religion ==
Maywood is home to Our Lady Queen of Peace Roman Catholic Church, First Presbyterian Church, Lutheran Church of the Redeemer, Zion Lutheran Church, St. Martin's Episcopal Church, and Temple Beth Israel, a Reconstructionist synagogue established in 1928, which moved to its current location in 1931.

== Transportation ==
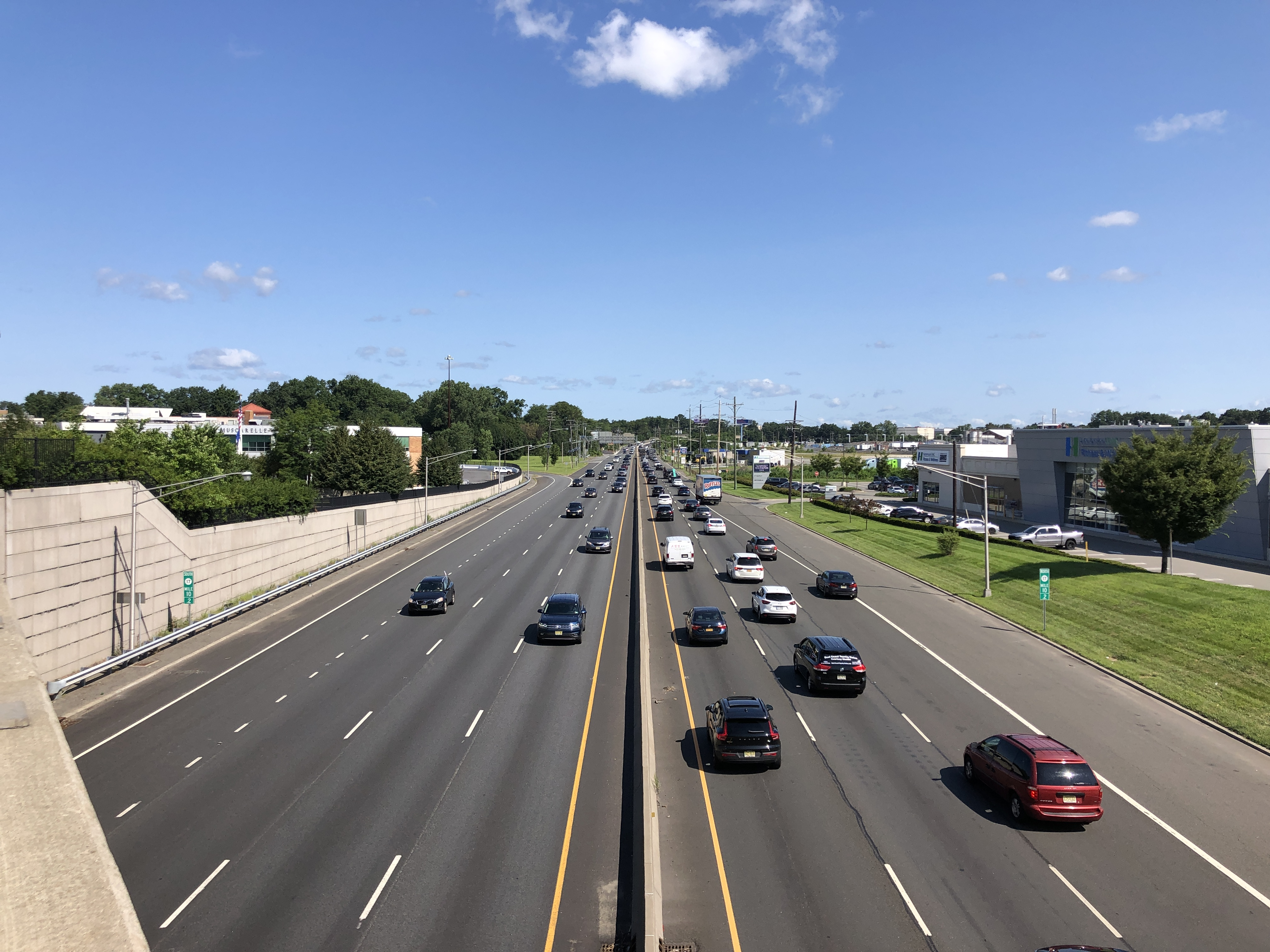
Route 17 northbound in Maywood

=== Roads and highways ===
As of May 2010, the borough had a total of 24.91 miles (40.09 km) of roadways, of which 21.06 miles (33.89 km) were maintained by the municipality, 3.54 miles (5.70 km) by Bergen County and 0.31 miles (0.50 km) by the New Jersey Department of Transportation.

Route 17 is the most significant highway passing through Maywood. Other main roads in Maywood include Maywood Avenue, Central Avenue, Passaic Street, and Spring Valley Road. The Garden State Parkway, Interstate 80 and Route 4 are all accessible in neighboring municipalities.

=== Public transportation ===
NJ Transit bus routes 144, 145, 148, 162, 163 and 164 serve the Port Authority Bus Terminal in Midtown Manhattan; The 175 route serves the George Washington Bridge Bus Terminal; and the 712, 751, 752, 753, 755, 758 and 770 provide local service in New Jersey.

The borough provides a shuttle three days a week operating from the senior center.

== Historic sites ==
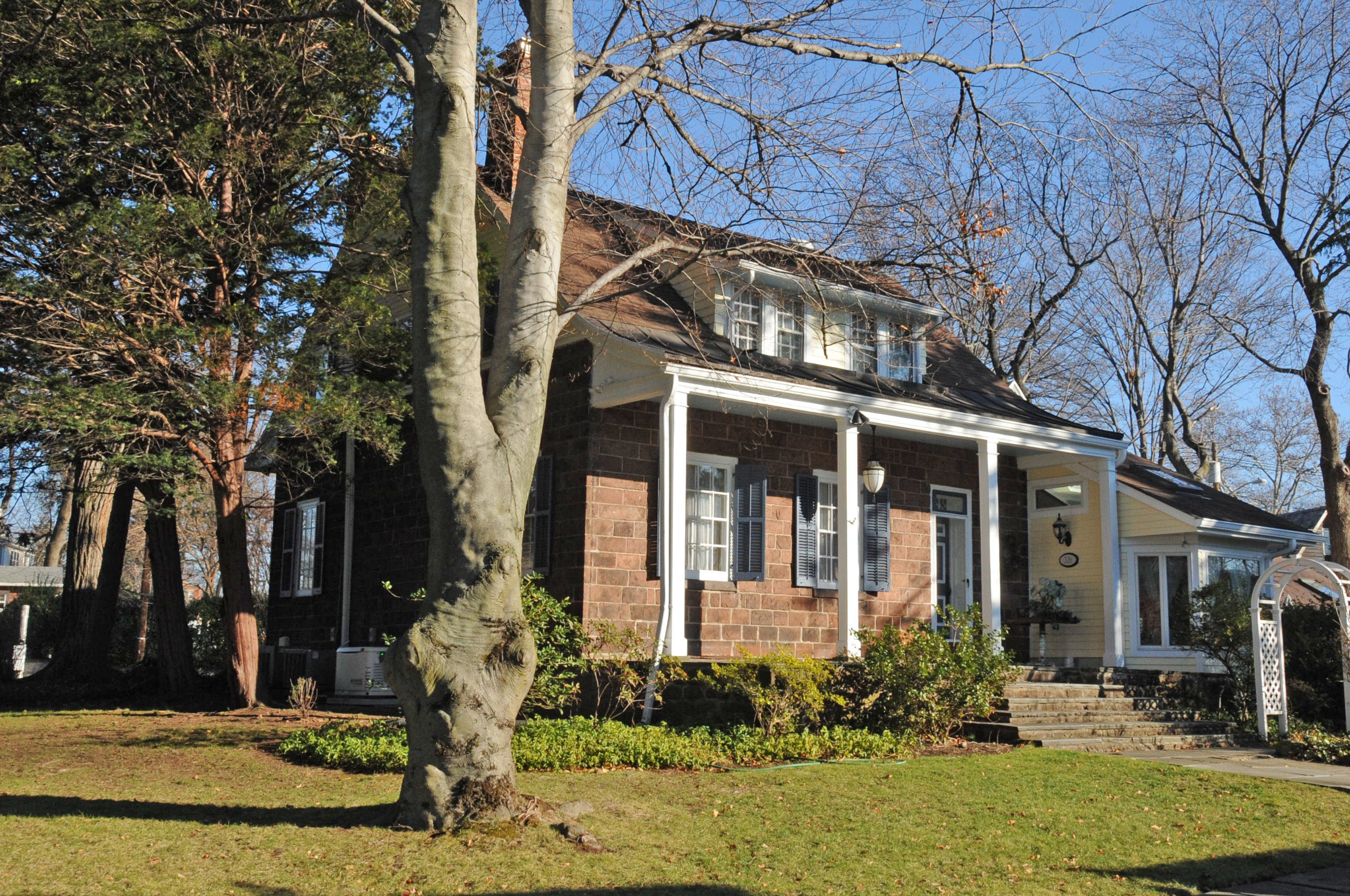
Romine-Van Voorhis House

In 2002, the Maywood Railroad Station was refurbished, after a proposal was made by the borough to demolish the building. In 2003, the building became listed on the National Register of Historic Places (NRHP), as Building No. 03000487. The station was restored by the all-volunteer, non-profit Maywood Station Historical Committee, who now operate the building as the Maywood Station Museum.

The Oldis-Brinckerhoff House, located on Maywood Avenue, held historical significance during the 1700s and 1800s. It became listed on the NRHP on January 10, 1983.

With its primary structure dating back to 1780, the Romine-Van Voorhis House, located on Maywood Avenue near the Oldis-Brinckerhoff House, was also listed on the NRHP on January 10, 1983.

== Notable people ==
People who were born in, residents of, or otherwise closely associated with Maywood include:

- Beverly Armstrong (born 1934), pitcher who played for the Rockford Peaches of the All-American Girls Professional Baseball League
- Regina Carter (born 1966), jazz violinist
- Tim Eustace (born 1956), member of the New Jersey General Assembly from 2011 to 2018, who served as mayor of Maywood from 2008 to 2012
- Barbie Ferreira (born 1996), model and actress who has appeared in HBO's Euphoria
- Alvester Garnett (born 1970), jazz drummer
- Edward H. Hynes (born 1946), politician who served two terms in the New Jersey General Assembly
- Henry Jager (born 1879 – ?), politician who was elected to the New York State Assembly as a Socialist, until he was removed from office based on his being a resident of Maywood
- James J. Maher, President of Niagara University
- Rick Schmidlin (born 1954), film producer.
- Walter G. Schroeder (1927–2021), politician who was a member of the Oregon House of Representatives from 1985 to 1993
- William Lee Stoddart (1868–1940), architect
- Danny Tamberelli (born 1982), child actor known for his appearances on TV in The Adventures of Pete & Pete and The Magic School Bus, as well as appearing in the films Igby Goes Down and The Mighty Ducks
- Justin Trattou (born 1988), defensive end who has played in the NFL for the New York Giants and Minnesota Vikings
- Alex Vincent (born 1981), known for his roles as a child actor in the Child's Play movies
- Ellen Zavian (born 1963), sports agent and attorney who was the National Football League's first female attorney-agent
