= DeKalb High School (Illinois) =

Location
- 501 W. Dresser Road; DeKalb, Illinois 60115; United States; 41.9107°N 88.7587°W

Information
- School type: public secondary
- School district: DeKalb Community Unit School District 428
- Superintendent: Billy Huermamo
- Principal: Dr. Donna Larson
- Staff: 134.14 (FTE)
- Grades: 9–12
- Gender: coed
- Enrollment: 2,070 (2023–2024)
- Average class size: 25
- Student to teacher ratio: 15.43
- Campus type: semi-rural
- Colors: orange black
- Slogan: "One Barb."
- Mascot: Barbie Crow
- Team name: Barbs
- Rival: Sycamore High School
- Accreditation: AdvancED
- Newspaper: Barb Wire
- Yearbook: Kalibre
- Awards: 2013 top 10% of schools by US News
- Website: dhs.d428.org

DeKalb High School is a public high school located in DeKalb, Illinois, in the United States. It is part of DeKalb Community Unit School District 428.

The current “DHS” campus was opened in 2011, which had been under construction for three years, the building beginning in 2008.

School mascot Barbie Crow sports the school’s spirit phrase “One Barb.”

The four year graduation rate is at 77.1% as of the 2023-2024 school year.

== History ==
DeKalb High School dates its founding to the early 1900s as "DeKalb Township High School." The original campus was located on North First Street, now the site of Clinton Rosette Middle School. Then, constructed in 1967, a new campus building was completed on South Fourth Street and Barb Blvd., with three classroom and facility additions since then. During the 1990s and through 2008, the district experienced strong growth, resulting in severe overcrowding. On February 5, 2008, voters in the district approved a referendum to construct a new 400,000-square-foot (37,000 m^{2}) high school facility on Dresser Road; east of Annie Glidden Road. The groundbreaking ceremony was held on May 27, 2009. It opened for the 2011-2012 school year. The former campus has been repurposed for use as Huntley Middle School, the former Huntley Middle school has been repurposed as Founders Elementary School, and the former Chesebro Elementary was repurposed as an Early Childhood/Pre-K Center.

== Academics ==
In 2014, DeKalb had an average composite ACT score of 25.3, and graduated 96.6% of its senior class. In addition, the school placed in the top 10% of schools in the nation, according to US News.

== Athletics ==
DeKalb's 22 athletic teams are known as the Barbs. This name comes from the fact that barbed wire was invented in DeKalb. Over the past century DeKalb has been a charter member of six high school athletic conferences: The Northern Illinois Football Conference in 1916, the North Central Illinois Conference in 1929, the Upstate Eight Conference in 1963, the Western Sun Conference in 2006, the Northern Illinois Big 12 Conference in 2010 and has been a member of the DuPage Valley Conference since 2019. DeKalb is a member of the Illinois High School Association.

=== National recognition ===
On February 7, 2009, the DHS basketball team gained national acclaim for an act of sportsmanship in a game against Milwaukee Madison High School. Just hours before the game began, Madison's senior captain Johntell Franklin learned of his mother's death. He initially informed his coach he would not play that night, but later came to the game and asked his coach to let him play. Since Franklin was not listed on the team roster, Madison would incur a technical foul, and DeKalb would get two free throws. DeKalb player Darius McNeal volunteered to take the free throws, and intentionally missed both, by rolling the ball out of bounds. Once the Madison team and fans realized that DeKalb had negated the foul to show support for Franklin, they stood and applauded. This act was reported extensively in the media, including ESPN.com, yahoo.com, World News Tonight, and the Lou Dobbs Report.

== Music ==
- In 2008 and 2012, the DHS Jazz Ensemble was named a finalist in the Essentially Ellington jazz ensemble competition, one of only 15 bands from all of North America to receive such honors.
- The Dekalb High School Guys' a cappella group, Fly Check, won the ICHSA Midwest regional championship in 2007 and 2008, and they attended nationals in New York City both years. In 2011-12, 2014–15, and 2015–16, the mixed a cappella group "Enharmonic Fusion" was selected to go to New York City for the ICHSA Finals. In 2016-17, the group placed second at the national competition.
- In the 2012-2013 school year, the DeKalb Marching Barbs were selected to perform, with other marching bands across the United States, at the half time show at the Sugar Bowl in New Orleans, Louisiana. During their stay in NOLA, the DHS Marching band competed against other bands in the region and won, with a clean sweep, making them able to be the band to hold the flag during the national anthem. At that time (senior), Max McArtor appeared on television on ESPN, and (sophomore) Veronica Sherman was shown on the Jumbotron twice.

== Other extracurricular activities ==
DeKalb sponsors the following extracurricular activities:

- Art Workshop
- Anime Club
- Badminton
- DHS Marching Band
- Baseball
- Barb Wire Newspaper
- Basketball
- Bowling
- Cheerleading
- Class Organizations
- Crobotics Robotics team
- Cross Country
- DCP/SAFE
- Eco Buds
- F.F.A.
- Football
- Forensics
- French
- Gamer's Guild
- Genders and Sexualities alliance (GSA)
- Graphics Club
- Golf
- Interact Club
- Intramural Sports
- Key Club
- Math Team
- Musicals
- National Honor Society
- New Pennies
- Outdoor Adventure club
- Peer Mediation
- Plays
- Pom Poms
- S.A.D.D.
- Scholastic Bowl
- Shop Club
- Sci-fi Club
- Soccer
- Softball
- Spanish Club
- String Band
- Student Council
- Swimming
- Tennis
- Track and Field
- Voices of Diversity
- Volleyball
- W.Y.S.E.
- Wrestling
- Yearbook

== Notable alumni ==
- Cindy Crawford - Supermodel, cosmetics entrepreneur and television personality
- Fred Eychaner - Media entrepreneur and philanthropist; founder of Newsweb and Sportsvision
- Mike Heimerdinger - Former NFL assistant coach; 2x Super Bowl Champion (XXXII, XXXIII)
- Toimi Jarvi - Former halfback for NFL's Philadelphia Eagles
- Richard Jenkins - Academy Award-nominated and Emmy Award-winning actor
- Dale and Alan Klapmeier - Aviation entrepreneurs and aircraft designers; founders of Cirrus
- Doug Mallory - Former NFL assistant coach
- Mike Mallory - Assistant coach for the Michigan Wolverines
- Karl Nelson - Former offensive tackle for NFL's New York Giants; Super Bowl Champion (XXI)
- Reino Nori (1913–1988) - Quarterback for the NFL's Brooklyn Dodgers and Chicago Bears
- Mel Owens - Former linebacker for NFL's Los Angeles Rams
- Richard Powers - Writer and professor; Pulitzer Prize-winning author of The Overstory (2019)
- Hellah Sidibe, former professional soccer player; ran across the United States in 2021
- Evar Swanson - Former MLB outfielder for Cincinnati Reds and Chicago White Sox
- Jeffrey Trail (1969–1997) – Navy veteran of the Gulf War and murder victim
- W. Willard Wirtz - United States Secretary of Labor under John F. Kennedy
