= Curwood =

Curwood may refer to:

- Curwood (surname), a surname
- Mount Curwood, a mountain of Michigan, United States
- Curwood Castle, a castle in Owosso, Michigan, United States

== See also ==
- Curwood Festival, a literary festival in the United States
