= Ralph Kirchenheiter =

American football coach and administrator (born 1939 or 1940)

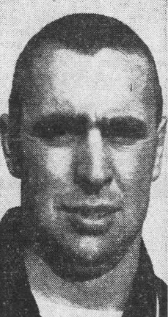
- Kirchenheiter in 1973

Biographical details
- Born: c. 1939 or 1940 (age 86–87); Hackensack, New Jersey, U.S.
- Education: West Virginia University; Wofford College (1961); Seton Hall University (1965); University of Rhode Island; University of Minnesota

Playing career

Football
- 1958: West Virginia
- 1959–1960: Wofford

Baseball
- 1959, 1961: Wallington Hillsides
- Positions: Guard, linebacker (football); First baseman (baseball)

Coaching career (HC unless noted)

Football
- 1964–1968: River Dell HS (NJ) (DC)
- 1969–1971: River Dell HS (NJ)
- 1972: William & Mary (DB)
- 1973–1977: William & Mary (DB/RC)
- 1978: William & Mary (DC/LB)
- 1979–1980: Virginia (DB)
- 1981–1989: Muhlenberg
- 1995: Lehigh (JV/DL)

Basketball
- c. 1960s: River Dell HS (NJ) (freshmen)

Track and field
- c. 1960s: River Dell HS (NJ)

Golf
- c. 1960s: River Dell HS (NJ)

Administrative career (AD unless noted)
- 1983–1984: Muhlenberg (interim AD)
- 1984–1995: Muhlenberg

Head coaching record
- Overall: 52–33–1 (college football); 18–9 (high school football)

Accomplishments and honors

Championships
- 2 Centennial (1983, 1986)

Ralph A. Kirchenheiter (born c. 1939 or 1940) is an American former college football coach and administrator. He was the head football coach and athletic director for Muhlenberg College from 1981 to 1989 and 1983 to 1995, respectively.

== Early life, playing career, and military career ==
Kirchenheiter was born in Hackensack, New Jersey, to Emil James Kirchenheiter (1903–1991) and Ruth Irma Blake (1905–1978) and was from German descent. He had at least two brothers. He grew up in Hasbrouck Heights, New Jersey and attended The Lincoln School. As a child, he was regularly involved in the school's plays and he served on the school's safety patrol as the lieutenant. In 1952, Kirchenheiter was hospitalized at Hackensack University Medical Center to receive an appendectomy. He graduated from The Lincoln School in 1953. In 1953, he was enrolled at Hasbrouck Heights High School. He was one of 37 freshmen to receive honor roll honors in 1954.

As a junior in 1955, Kirchenheiter transferred to Wallington High School in Wallington, New Jersey. With Wallington, he began to play high school football. He was a member of the third-ever football team for Wallington under head coach Bill Tryanowski as a guard. He mainly served as a backup during his initial season with the team. During his senior year, Kirchenheiter became a three-sport athlete, participating in football, baseball, and basketball. As a member of the football team, he was voted as the team's co-captain. At the fourth annual Wallington Hall School dinner sponsored by the Hillside Club boosters, Kirchenheiter and three other seniors were honored as recipients of the John Lulay Memorial Trophy. Kirchenheiter was specifically selected due to his success in baseball and football. The dinner's guest speaker was former professional football player Augie Lio, then editor of the Passaic City Herald. Kirchenheiter earned a scholarship through the Hillside Ladies' Auxiliary.

Kirchenheiter briefly attended West Virginia University in pursuit of becoming an engineer before transferring to Wofford College. He was a guard and linebacker on the Terriers football team. He served as a reserve at only 195 pounds, lining up mostly with the second team line.

While attending Wofford, Kirchenheiter played baseball as a first baseman with the Wallington Hillsides, a semi-professional independent team.

Kirchenheiter was a member of Sigma Phi Epsilon.

In 1960, Kirchenheiter enrolled into a Reserve Officers' Training Corps training camp at Fort Benning in Columbus, Georgia, as a cadet. During the training, he received specialized training on becoming a second lieutenant. He officially enlisted in the United States Army as a second lieutenant in September 1961. He completed an eight-week officer orientation course at the Transportation School at Fort Eustis in Newport News, Virginia. The training was in preparation in becoming a Transportation Corps officer. In June 1962, he was stationed in San Francisco as a special services officer. In 1963, he was promoted first lieutenant at a ceremony held at the Oakland Army Base. Alongside his promotion, he was in the plans branch of the Cargo Operations Division.

== Coaching and administration career ==
Kirchenheiter began his coaching career in 1964 as the defensive coordinator for River Dell High School. In his initial season, he served under Bergen County Coach of the Year Matty Certosimo, as the team finished with a perfect 9–0 record. In June 1967, Kirchenheiter earned his master's degree in education from Seton Hall University. Alongside Seton Hall, he also attended the University of Rhode Island and attended the University of Minnesota. He spoke at coaching clinics during the offseason, specifically talking about drills pertaining to linebackers. After five seasons he was promoted to head football coach at the recommendation of former head coach Certosimo. In Kirchenheiter's first season, he led the team to a disastrous 1–8 season. In his second season, the team finished with an undefeated 9–0 season including the North Bergen Interscholastic Athletic League (NBIAL) championship. After the season he was voted as the NBIAL Coach of the Year. In 1971, the team finished with a 8–1 record and repeated as conference champions. He resigned in January 1972 after three seasons as head coach, he led the team to an overall record of 18–9 and back-to-back NBIAL championships.

While coaching football for the high school, Kirchenheiter taught science as River Dell Junior High School. He also served as the head golf and track and field coach and as the freshmen basketball coach for the high school.

In 1972, Kirchenheiter was hired as the defensive backs coach for William & Mary, his first collegiate coaching position. In 1973, he was promoted to the team's recruiting coordinator. In 1978, he was promoted to defensive coordinator and shifted from defensive backs coach to linebackers coach. He succeeded Lou Tepper who left for Virginia Tech. In his lone season as defensive coordinator, he helped lead the Tribe to a 5–5–1 and the fifth best passing defense in the country. During his stint with William & Mary, he sent two players to the NFL: linebackers Steve Shull and Jim Ryan. In 1979, he left to become the defensive backs coach for Virginia. During his time with the Cavaliers he sent one defensive back to the NFL: Tony Blount.

After two seasons with Virginia, Kirchenheiter was hired as the head football coach for Muhlenberg College. He took over for Frank P. Marino who held the position for 11 seasons. Kirchenheiter mainly retained the previous staff of Bob Kohler, Dick Butler, Tom Filipovits, and Bob Shaffer. Kirchenheiter also, for the first time in his career, took control of the team's offense despite having built his reputation as a defensive coach. He modeled his offensive after Wake Forest head coach John Mackovic and his use of the I formation. In his first two seasons, Muhlenberg was a member of the Middle Atlantic Conference (MAC) and finished with a 3–5 and 4–5 record in 1981 and 1982, respectively. In 1983, the school's first as a member of the Centennial Conference, the team finished with its first winning season under Kirchenheiter as the team finished 6–3 alongside sharing the inaugural Centennial Conference championship. From 1985 to 1988, the team finished four-straight seasons with a record of 7–3. In 1989, the team finished 5–4–1, its worst since 1982. Following the season, Kirchenheiter resigned, ending his tenure having never beaten rival Moravian. He amassed an overall record of 52–33–1, just two wins short of the Muhlenberg all-time wins leader behind his predecessor Frank P. Marino.

While serving as head coach, Kirchenheiter served as an assistant professor of physical education. In 1983, he was named interim athletic director after Joseph Now fell ill. After a year in the interim position, he was promoted to full-time athletic director in 1984. His first actions taken as athletic director was hiring the first-ever full-time assistant football coach in Brian Bodine and hiring a track coach. He also added three women's sports in track and field, cross country, and lacrosse. He resigned in 1995.

In 1995, Kirchenheiter returned to coaching as the junior varsity coach and defensive line coach for Lehigh. He spent one season with the school.

== Personal life ==
In April 1961, Kirchenheiter got engaged to Andrea Gorcica, a junior at the University of North Carolina at Chapel Hill. The pair married in June 1962 at the Most Sacred Heart Church after holding their reception at the Knights of Columbus Hall in Wallington. They celebrated their honeymoon in San Francisco, where Kirchenheiter was stationed. Their daughter was born in January 1964 in The Valley Hospital in Paramus, New Jersey. She was the first baby born of Oakland, New Jersey, parents in 1964 and as a result was selected as the winner of free diaper services from Consolidated Laundry Service in Mount Vernon, New York. Their son was born two years later.

In 1966, Kirchenheiter was involved in a car accident at 4:30 a.m. when a Pompton Lakes native crossed over the center line on New Jersey Route 208 and hit Kirchenheiter's vehicle causing extensive damage to the front fender. Neither man was injured while the Pompton Lakes man was given a citation for leaving the accident.

== Head coaching record ==
=== College football ===
Year	Team	Overall	Conference	Standing	Bowl/playoffs
Muhlenberg Mules (Middle Atlantic Conference) (1981–1982)
1981	Muhlenberg	3–5	3–5	8th (Southern)	
1982	Muhlenberg	4–5	4–4	5th (Southern)	
Muhlenberg Mules (Centennial Conference) (1983–1989)
1983	Muhlenberg	6–3	5–2	T–1st	
1984	Muhlenberg	6–3	5–2	3rd	
1985	Muhlenberg	7–3	5–2	3rd	
1986	Muhlenberg	7–3	6–1	T–1st	
1987	Muhlenberg	7–3	5–2	T–2nd	
1988	Muhlenberg	7–3	5–2	3rd	
1989	Muhlenberg	5–4–1	4–2–1	3rd	
Muhlenberg:		52–33–1	42–22–1		
Total:		52–33–1			
National championship Conference title Conference division title or championship game berth

=== High school ===
Year	Team	Overall	Conference	Standing	Bowl/playoffs
River Dell Golden Hawks (North Bergen Interscholastic Athletic League) (1969–1971)
1969	River Dell	1–8	1–5	(Eastern)	
1970	River Dell	9–0			
1971	River Dell	8–1			
River Dell:		18–9			
Total:		18–9			
National championship Conference title Conference division title or championship game berth
