= Curwood (surname) =

Curwood is a surname. Notable people with the surname include:

- Albert Curwood (1910–1971), English footballer
- James Oliver Curwood (1878–1927), American writer and conservationist
- Sarah Thomas Curwood (1916–1990), American educator, college professor, activist, and tree farmer
- Steve Curwood (born 1947), American journalist, writer, radio personality, and actor
