= Al Pfeifer =

American football player

No. 58, 70, 99
- Position: End

Personal information
- Born: December 27, 1928; Newark, New Jersey, U.S.
- Died: March 6, 2013 (aged 84); Woodland Hills, California, U.S.
- Listed height: 6 ft 1 in (1.85 m)
- Listed weight: 200 lb (91 kg)

Career information
- High school: Hasbrouck Heights (Hasbrouck Heights, New Jersey)
- College: Fordham
- NFL draft: 1951: 16th round, 194th overall pick

Career history
- New York Giants (1951)*; Toronto Argonauts (1951–1956); Ottawa Rough Riders (1957)
- * Offseason or practice squad member only

Awards and highlights
- 2× IRFU All-Star (1951, 1955); IRFU receptions leader (1954); 2× IRFU receiving yards leader (1954–1955); IRFU receiving touchdowns leader (1955)

Alan Ross Pfeifer (December 27, 1928 – March 6, 2013) was an American professional football end who played six seasons in the Interprovincial Rugby Football Union (IRFU) with the Toronto Argonauts and Ottawa Rough Riders. He played college football at Fordham University, where he set school career records in receptions, receiving yards, and receiving touchdowns. He was selected by the New York Giants in the 16th round of the 1951 NFL draft but was later released. Pfeifer then played in the IRFU from 1951 to 1957. He was named an IRFU all-star in both 1951 and 1955 and led the league in several receiving categories during his career. He was named to the Argonauts all-time team in 1974.

== Early life and college ==
Alan Ross Pfeifer was born on December 27, 1928, in Newark, New Jersey. He played high school football and baseball at Hasbrouck Heights High School in Hasbrouck Heights, New Jersey. He earned All-State honors twice in football and once in baseball. Pfeifer was captain of the football team his senior year.

Pfeifer played college football for the Fordham Rams of Fordham University. During the 1949 season, he set an Eastern region and school record for receptions with 38. He caught 35 passes for 571 yards and five touchdowns as a senior in 1950, earning Catholic All-American honors, as Fordham finished 8–1. Pfeifer concluded his college career with totals of 95 receptions for 1,346 yards and 16 touchdowns, which were all Fordham records. He was selected to play in the North–South Shrine Game after his senior year. He graduated from Fordham in 1951.

== Professional career ==
=== New York Giants ===
The Green Bay Packers were interested in selecting Pfeifer in the 1951 NFL draft. However, after learning that the New York Giants were also interested in him, Pfeifer told the Packers that he was probably going to get drafted into the United States Army. Pfeifer was then selected by the Giants in the 16th round, with the 194th overall pick, of the 1951 draft. He officially signed with the Giants on May 5, 1951. On August 17, 1951, he played in the Chicago Charities College All-Star Game against the NFL champion Cleveland Browns. Pfeifer caught a 15-yard pass from Fran Nagle as the College All-Stars lost to the Browns by a score of 33–0. Pfeifer played for the Giants during the preseason, but was released in late September 1951 before the start of the regular season.

=== Toronto Argonauts ===
After being released by the Giants, Pfeifer signed with the Toronto Argonauts of the Interprovincial Rugby Football Union (IRFU). The Argonauts released Oatten Fisher to make room on the roster for Pfeifer. Pfeifer played in six games, all starts, for the Argonauts in 1951, catching 43 catches for 799 yards. The Argonauts lost in the IRFU semifinals to the Hamilton Tiger-Cats. Pfeifer was named an IRFU All-Star for his performance during the 1951 season.

Pfeifer missed the entire 1952 season while serving in the United States Army during the Korean War. He returned to the Argonauts in 1953 on a part-time basis. He was able to play in five games that year due to being on a month-long furlough from the Army. He was released from the Army in December 1953.

Pfeifer appeared in all 14 games for Toronto during the 1954 season, recording 68 receptions for 1,142 yards and six touchdowns. His reception and receiving yard totals both set team records and were the most in the league that year. Despite his strong season, Toronto finished with a losing record at 6–8.

Pfeifer played in 12 games in 1955, catching 75 passes for 1,342 yards and 15 touchdowns on offense while making one interception on defense. He set new team records in all three receiving categories while also leading the IRFU in scoring. His receiving yardage and touchdown totals also led the league. Toronto finished the year with a 4–8 record. They beat the Tiger-Cats in the IRFU semifinals by a score of 32–28 before losing to the Montreal Alouettes in the finals 38–36. Pfeifer was named an IRFU All-Star for his performance during the 1955 season.

Pfeifer played in 13 games in 1956, totaling 78 catches for 993 yards and six touchdowns, setting the team record in receptions for the third straight season. He also posted one interception. However, the Argonauts finished with a 4–10 record.

Pfeifer was released by Toronto on August 11, 1957. New Argonauts head coach Hamp Pool said that Pfeifer was a good receiver but he lacked the blocking ability required of ends in Pool's system. Pfeifer finished his stint in Toronto with team records for most 100-yard games in a career (17) and in a season (eight). He also spent some time as placekicker in Toronto, converting zero of two field goals and 23 of 30 extra points in 1955, and two of five extra points in 1956.

=== Ottawa Rough Riders ===
On August 14, 1957, Pfeifer was claimed off waivers by the Ottawa Rough Riders of the IRFU. He played in all 14 games for the Rough Riders during the 1957 season, catching 44 passes for 700 yards and three touchdowns. Ottawa went 8–6 and lost in the IRFU semifinals to the Alouettes by a margin of 24–15. Pfeifer was waived on May 29, 1958.

== Personal life and legacy ==
Pfeifer worked in Toronto during the IRFU offseasons. After his IRFU career, he lived in western Canada and Phoenix, Arizona, before moving to California in the late 1990s. He worked in the equestrian supply industry.

On June 14, 1974, Pfeifer was selected to the all-time All-Argonaut team (spanning 1945–1973). He was inducted into the Fordham Athletic Hall of Fame in 1989, and the Hasbrouck Heights High School Hall of Fame in 2003. He died on March 6, 2013, in Woodland Hills, California, after a long illness.
