= Peter Dykstra =

American journalist (1957–2024)

- Born: March 2, 1957; Hackensack, New Jersey, U.S.
- Died: July 31, 2024 (aged 67); Atlanta, Georgia, U.S.
- Education: Boston University
- Spouse: Meryl Nash
- Children: 3 (Alyson, James, Matthew)
- Awards: Emmy Award, Peabody Award, Dupont-Columbia Award

Peter David Dykstra (March 2, 1957 – July 31, 2024) was an American Greenpeace activist and a CNN environment correspondent.

== Early life and education ==
Dykstra was born in Hackensack, New Jersey, and raised in Hasbrouck Heights. He graduated from Boston University.

== Career ==
Dykstra joined the Greenpeace office in Boston as a volunteer in 1978. Later on, he was the U.S. media director in Washington, D.C. for the organization.

He started with CNN in Atlanta in 1991 as a research manager and was eventually promoted to senior executive producer of a CNN unit covering topics including science, technology, the weather, and the environment. He worked there for 17 years, until 2008.

Dykstra was a regular on the syndicated Public Radio International radio show Living on Earth where he contributed a weekly round-up of the latest environmental news.

He was the publisher of Environmental Health News and The Daily Climate after his time with CNN was over. The sites published original reporting and also aggregated climate and environmental news coverage. He was with the sites till recent years when he started facing health problems. Thereafter, he became a contributor to the sites.

== Death ==
Dykstra died due to complications of pneumonia leading to respiratory failure at an Atlanta hospital, on July 31, 2024, at the age of 67. He had been paralyzed from the waist down since 2017 after a spinal infection.
