= Sarah Thomas Curwood =

American educator

- Sarah Thomas Curwood, from a 1937 magazine
- Born: Sarah Ethel Thomas; January 23, 1916; Binghamton, New York
- Died: October 6, 1990 (aged 74); Nottingham, New Hampshire
- Occupations: Educator, college professor, tree farmer
- Children: 2, including Steve Curwood

Sarah Ethel Thomas Curwood (January 23, 1916 – October 9, 1990) was an American educator, college professor, activist, and tree farmer.

== Early life and education ==
Sarah Ethel Thomas was born in Binghamton, New York, the daughter of Maurice Thomas and Sarah (or Sadie) Dorsey Thomas. She graduated from Cornell University with a bachelor's degree in economics in 1937. She was one of the first black women to graduate from Cornell. She earned a master's degree in education from Boston University in 1947, with a thesis titled "Social relations of three year old children in a nursery school, a study of the techniques used by the teachers to influence social relations". She completed doctoral studies in sociology at Radcliffe College in 1956, with a dissertation titled "Role Expectation as a Factor in the Relationship Between Mother and Teacher".

== Career ==
Curwood taught early childhood education courses at Harvard Graduate School of Education from 1952 to 1955. She also taught sociology courses at Antioch College, Rhode Island College, University of New Hampshire, and Knoxville College. She retired from college teaching in 1984.

Curwood taught preschool in Jamaica Plain, passed the Boston exam for municipal playground workers in 1942, and in the late 1960s was a training officer for the Head Start program in New Hampshire and Vermont. She was active in the Boston Urban League, the Massachusetts Mothers' Health Council, Planned Parenthood of Massachusetts, Girl Scouts, Women Radio Operators of New England, and the American Friends Service Committee. She served on the Massachusetts Committee on Children and Youth.

Curwood also owned and ran a tree farm and dog kennels in Nottingham, New Hampshire, and was a member of the Rockingham County Forest Advisory Board.

== Personal life ==
Sarah Thomas married businessman James L. Curwood in 1936. They had two children, Sarah and Stephen (later known as journalist Steve Curwood). Sarah Thomas Curwood was widowed in 1949, when her husband died by suicide. She died in 1990, aged 74 years, in Nottingham, New Hampshire. A large collection of her papers are in the Schlesinger Library, Radcliffe Institute, and a smaller collection at Cornell University. Her granddaughter, Anastasia C. Curwood, used Curwood's papers as primary sources for her book, Stormy Weather: Middle-Class African-American Marriages Between the Two World Wars (University of North Carolina Press 2010).
