= Bruce Aitken =

American radio host and former money launderer

Bruce Aitken is a radio host and the author of the book Mr Clean - Cash, Drugs and the CIA: The True Story of a Master Money Launderer, in which he writes about laundering money in the 1970s and 1980s.

== Biography ==
Aitken grew up in Hasbrouck Heights, New Jersey. He graduated from Hasbrouck Heights High School in 1963 and played as pitcher for the Florida Southern Moccasins baseball team, graduating from Florida Southern in 1967.

He moved to Vietnam in 1969, during the Vietnam War, to work for American Express. He later moved to Hong Kong.

In 1989, he was arrested in Thailand and sent to the United States on money-laundering and drug-trafficking charges. He was later sentenced to five years in jail and served less than one as part of a plea bargain.

Aitken has broadcast his religious-themed radio show The Hour of Love since 2004. In an article for the Foreign Correspondents' Club of Hong Kong's The Correspondent magazine in August 2020, he wrote of the show: “On the radio programme, real letters from inmates are received and read live into the public realm.”

Speaking of his broadcast work to The New York Times in 2017, Aitken said: “Maybe I do it for my own personal penance.”
