= Hasbrouck Heights High School =

High school in New Jersey, United States

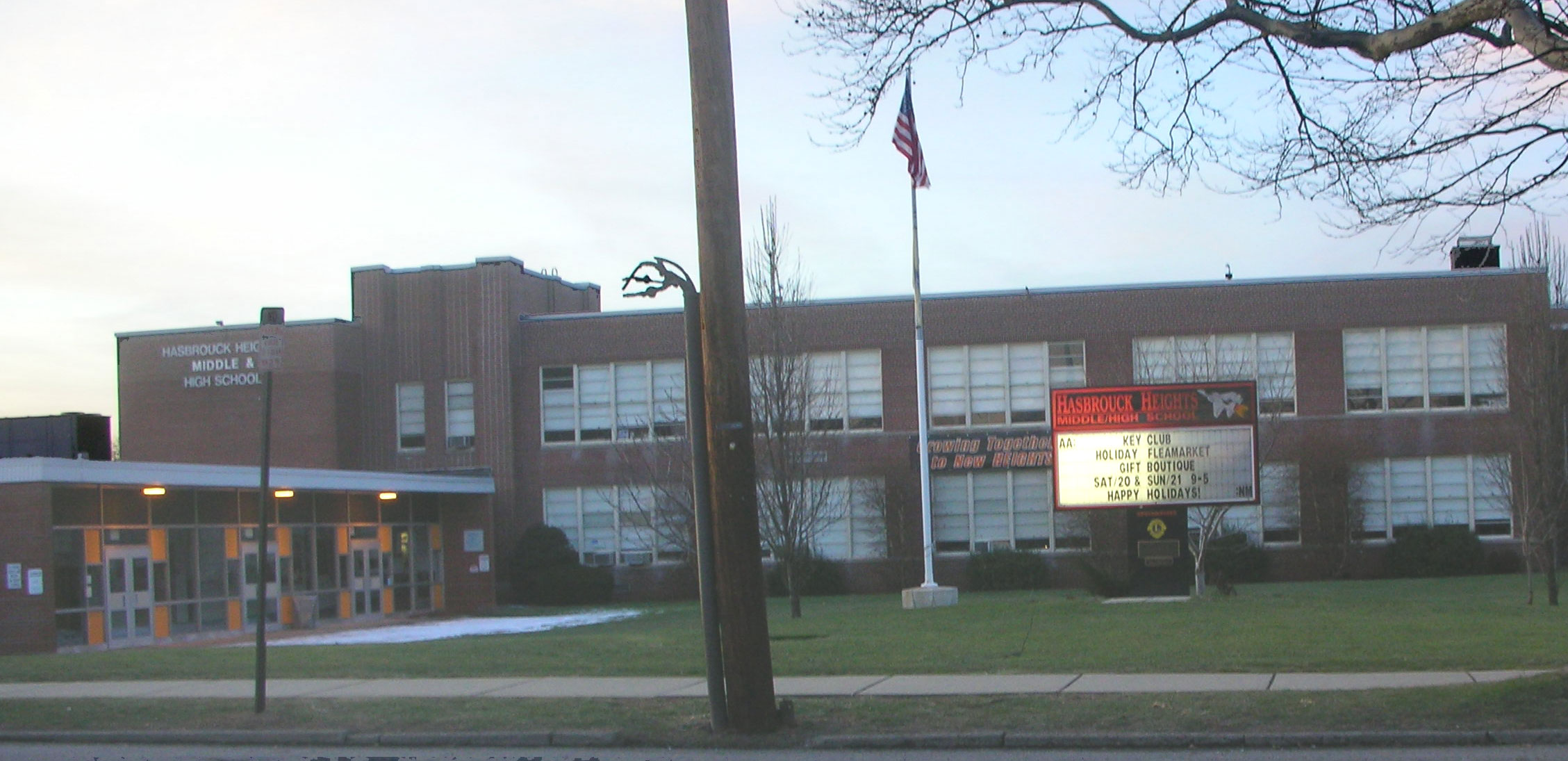
- Hasbrouck Heights High School

Location
- 365 Boulevard; Hasbrouck Heights, Bergen County, New Jersey 07604; United States; 40.866816°N 74.073362°W

Information
- Type: Public high school
- School district: Hasbrouck Heights School District
- NCES School ID: 340693000512
- Principal: Vincenzo Barchini
- Faculty: 44.6 FTEs
- Grades: 9–12
- Enrollment: 499 (as of 2024–25)
- Student to teacher ratio: 11.2:1
- Colors: Orange and black
- Athletics conference: North Jersey Interscholastic Conference
- Team name: Aviators
- Rival: Wood-Ridge High School
- Yearbook: Coronian
- Website: www.hhschools.org/o/hhhs

Hasbrouck Heights High School is a comprehensive four-year public high school serving students in ninth through twelfth grades from Hasbrouck Heights and Teterboro in Bergen County, in the U.S. state of New Jersey, operating as the lone high school of the Hasbrouck Heights School District.

The district serves students from Teterboro, a non-operating district that was merged into the Hasbrouck Heights School District following its dissolution in July 2010.

As of the 2024–25 school year, the school had an enrollment of 499 students and 44.6 classroom teachers (on an FTE basis), for a student–teacher ratio of 11.2:1. There were 90 students (18.0% of enrollment) eligible for free lunch and 20 (4.0% of students) eligible for reduced-cost lunch.

== Awards, recognition and rankings ==
The school was the 138th-ranked public high school in New Jersey out of 339 schools statewide in New Jersey Monthly magazine's September 2014 cover story on the state's "Top Public High Schools", using a new ranking methodology. The school had been ranked 72nd in the state of 328 schools in 2012, after being ranked 107th in 2010 out of 322 schools listed. The magazine ranked the school 82nd in 2008 out of 316 schools. The school was ranked 92nd in the magazine's September 2006 issue, which included 316 schools across the state. Schooldigger.com ranked the school tied for 49th out of 381 public high schools statewide in its 2011 rankings (a decrease of 14 positions from the 2010 ranking) which were based on the combined percentage of students classified as proficient or above proficient on the mathematics (93.2%) and language arts literacy (96.6%) components of the High School Proficiency Assessment (HSPA).

== Athletics ==
The Hasbrouck Heights Aviators participate in the Meadowlands Conference of the North Jersey Interscholastic Conference, which is comprised of small-enrollment schools in Bergen, Hudson, Morris and Passaic counties, and was created following a reorganization of sports leagues in Northern New Jersey by the New Jersey State Interscholastic Athletic Association (NJSIAA). Prior to realignment that took effect in fall 2010, Hasbrouck Heights was a part of the Bergen County Scholastic League. With 418 students in grades 10–12, the school was classified by the NJSIAA for the 2019–20 school year as Group I for most athletic competition purposes, which included schools with an enrollment of 75 to 476 students in that grade range. The school was classified by the NJSIAA as Group I North for football for 2024–2026, which included schools with 254 to 474 students. The team nickname is the Aviators.

The school participates in joint boys / girls swimming teams with Garfield High School as the host school / lead agency. These co-op programs operate under agreements scheduled to expire at the end of the 2023–24 school year.

=== Baseball ===
The baseball team won the North I, Group I state sectional championship in 2007, topping Verona High School by a score of 7–4 in the tournament final.

In 2021, the team defeated Kinnelon High School for the North I, Group I state sectional championship by a score of 6–2.

=== Girls' basketball ===
In 2015, the girls' basketball team won the North I, Group I state sectional championship with a 40–27 victory against Wood-Ridge High School in the tournament final, the first state title for any of the school's basketball teams.

=== Football ===
The football team was awarded the North I Group I sectional championship by the New Jersey State Interscholastic Athletic Association in 1945, 1946, 1947 1952, 1954 (as co-champion), 1955, 1962, 1964, 1968, 1969 and 1972. Since the playoff system was introduced in 1974, the team has won the NJSIAA North I Group I state sectional championship in 1975, 1976, 1994, 2007, 2016 and 2017 and won the North II Group I title in 2018. Hasbrouck Heights High School has won a total of 18 Group I state sectional championships, 11 which were awarded by the NJSIAA and seven won by playoff. In 1969, the Aviators went undefeated at 9–0, setting a county record after scoring 478 points and earning top-ten rankings nationally and the top spot in the state.

In 1975, the Heights team went 10–0–1 and won the North I, Group I state sectional title by defeating Ridgefield Memorial High School 22–6 in the championship game in the second year that the NJSIAA held playoffs for sectional titles. They were also the BCSL National champions that season. In 1976, the 11–0 Heights Aviators repeated as North I, Group I sectional champions by defeating Mahwah High School in the finals and were the league champions of the BCSL National. In 1994, the Heights team went 10–1 and won the North I, Group I state sectional championship by defeating North Arlington High School by a score of 14–6 at the tournament final at Giants Stadium.

In 2007, the team finished the season with 12–0 record after winning the North I, Group I state sectional championship with a 26–16 win over New Milford High School, in a game played at Giants Stadium. The team also won the BCSL Olympic league championship.

The team won the North I, Group I state sectional title in 2016 with a 30–12 win against New Milford High School in the tournament final.

In 2017, the team won its second consecutive North I, Group I state sectional title—its sixth overall in the playoff era—with a 39–14 win against sixth-seeded Pompton Lakes High School in the final game of the playoffs, played at Kean University.

The team won their third consecutive sectional title in 2018, winning the North II Group I title with a 13–7 win against Malcolm X Shabazz High School in the finals of the playoff tournament and went on to win the North Group I bowl game with a 41–7 win against Butler High School.

The Hasbrouck Heights football Aviators natural rival by geographic location are the Wood-Ridge High School Blue Devils. The two programs had one of the state's longest Thanksgiving Day rivalry games dating back to 1941, and lasting until a final game in the series in 2009, after which realignment prevented a continuation of the match-up. Hasbrouck Heights had an overall 55–12–1 record in the Thanksgiving Day match-up with Wood-Ridge, including a 21-year Thanksgiving Day game winning streak.

=== Girls' soccer ===
The joint Hasbrouck Heights/Wood-Ridge High School soccer team won the North I Group II state sectional championship in 2008 with a 2–0 win against Glen Rock High School.

=== Tennis ===
In 1968, the men's tennis team had a perfect 17–0 record. They won the BCSL title and became the only men's sports team to go undefeated for an entire season.

In 2013, the top-ranked boys' tennis team beat Cedar Grove High School by 3–2 to claim the North I Group I state sectional title.

=== Wrestling ===
The recreation level wrestling program was established in the 1970s. In 1976, heavyweight Bill Spindler became the school's first NJSIAA state champion, pinning each of his opponents on his way to the gold medal.

The Aviators captured their first North I Group I state sectional championship in 1989 after a one-sided victory over defending champion Waldwick High School. The team was back-to-back champions in 1990, and won again in 1993 and 1995, before winning on North II Group I in 2006 and 2007. For their accomplishments, the 1989 team was elected to the Hasbrouck Heights Athletic Hall of Fame in 2005.

In 2001, Morgan Horner won the 189 lb. weight class at the NJSIAA championships defeating the defending champion. This accomplishment earned Horner the award for the championship's Most Outstanding Wrestler.

The 2006 team won the state North II, Group I sectional title. The 2007 team repeated as North II, Group I state sectional championship with a 46–16 win vs. Madison High School.

=== Girls' track & field ===
The spring track program won state sectional championships in 1994 and 1998.

=== Boys' track & field ===
The boys' outdoor team won state sectional titles in 1970, 1994, 2006, and have finished 2nd in the state group championships in 2005, 2006, 2009, 2010. The 2010 boys' 4 × 400 team won the league, county group, state sectional, and state group championships, setting new meet records in the county and state sectional.

The boys' track team won the 2011 Group I indoor relay championships.

== Extracurricular activities ==
=== Pilot's Log ===
The high school publishes Pilot's Log, an award-winning student newspaper. At the 2006 National Scholastic Press Association Fall National High School Journalism Convention in Nashville, Tennessee, Pilot's Log earned the highest accolade of "best in show" for newspapers with 13–16 pages, from all high schools, regardless of size. The newspaper staff also won a National Pacemaker Award for the publication, one of 26 high school publications nationwide to be recognized, unofficially known as the "Pulitzer Prizes of student journalism".

=== Theatrical performances ===
Every school year, a selected performance is created by students under the supervision of the school's communications teacher Erin Schneeweiss. A different play is performed every year.

=== Music ===
The school holds a concert three times during the school year in which the concert band and jazz band perform. The marching band came in first place in Best Music as well as Best Effect during the 2012 USSBA Competition.

== Administration ==
The principal is Vincenzo Barchini. His core administration team includes the vice principal.

== Notable alumni ==
- Bruce Aitken, radio host and author
- Jason Biggs (born 1978), actor, star of American Pie film series
- William A. Caldwell (1906–1986), Pulitzer Prize-winning columnist
- Guy W. Calissi (1909–1980), lawyer and politician who served as Mayor of Wood-Ridge, Bergen County prosecutor and as a judge on New Jersey Superior Court
- Arthur Godfrey (1903–1983), radio and television broadcaster and entertainer
- Kathy Godfrey (c. 1915–1981), talk show host on radio and television
- Ralph Kirchenheiter (born c. 1939 or 1940), former college football coach and administrator, who was the head football coach and athletic director at Muhlenberg College
- Joe Maniaci (1914–1996), football player and coach who played in the National Football League (NFL) with the Brooklyn Dodgers and the Chicago Bears
- Al Pfeifer (1928–2013), professional football end who played for the Toronto Argonauts and Ottawa Rough Riders
- Scott Slutzker (born 1972), former NFL tight end who played for the Indianapolis Colts and New Orleans Saints
