= William A. Caldwell =

American journalist and columnist

William Anthony Caldwell
- Born: December 5, 1906; Butler, Pennsylvania, US
- Died: April 11, 1986 (aged 79); Oak Bluffs, Massachusetts, US
- Occupations: journalist and columnist
- Years active: 1924–1972
- Employer: The Record (Bergan County)
- Awards: Pulitzer Prize – Criticism or Commentary; 1971 Simeon Stylites

William Anthony Caldwell (December 5, 1906 – April 11, 1986) was an American journalist and columnist who spent 48 years at The Record of Bergen County, New Jersey. He won the 1971 Pulitzer Prize for Commentary.

Caldwell was born in Butler, Pennsylvania and grew up in Titusville, Pennsylvania. When he was eleven, his family moved to New Jersey and he attended Hasbrouck Heights High School. In his sophomore year, his father, a newspaper editor, died. His newspaper career began at age 15 when he became a part-time editor of the weekly Hasbrouck Heights Newsletter. By the time he graduated from high school in 1924, he had worked for the Associated Press as a clerk and part-time for the Hudson Dispatch of Union City, New Jersey.

His long career at The Record began in 1924 as a stringer covering local sports. He became a full-time sports writer in 1926 and then began covering local Prohibition era politics. In 1927, he and another reporter uncovered a scandal involving a new sewer system in Lodi Township, New Jersey, which resulted in a senator being expelled from the New Jersey Senate. In October 1931 he covered the opening of the George Washington Bridge.

In 1931 he began writing his six-day-a-week editorial column called "Simeon Stylites", named after Saint Simeon Stylites, a 5th-century ascetic who lived on top of a pillar for 39 years. Each column was exactly 85 lines long and he wrote about 12,000 of them until he retired in 1972, the year after he won the Pulitzer Prize. In 1972, Rutgers University Press published a compilation of 112 of Caldwell's "Simeon Stylites" as In the Record: the Simeon Stylites Columns of William A. Caldwell (1972).

He retired to Martha's Vineyard but continued to write a Sunday column for The Record and served as a columnist and editor for the Vineyard Gazette.
