= Kathy Godfrey =

American talk show host

Kathryn Morton Godfrey (c. 1915 – February 4, 1981) was an American talk show host on radio and television and sister of entertainer Arthur Godfrey. She was also known professionally as Kathy Morton. Her first name is sometimes seen spelled Katherine.

== Early years ==
A native of Hasbrouck Heights, New Jersey, where the family lived in a store, Godfrey was the second-youngest of five children born to Arthur Hanbury Godfrey and Kathryn Morton Godfrey. Her father was an itinerant reporter; her mother played piano in a movie theater and painted china for sale. She attended Hasbrouck Heights High School.

At age 18 she was a hostess at a Schrafft's restaurant in New York and dreamed of being a dining-room hostess on cruise ships.

== Career ==
At age 16, Godfrey began broadcasting at a small radio station in New Jersey. Her career was interrupted in 1931 when she contracted polio and had to spend a year in a hospital. When she recovered sufficiently, she took classes to prepare herself for a return to radio. She had her own program in Rochester, Minnesota, followed by stints on KRDO in Colorado Springs, Colorado, and on KPHO in Phoenix, Arizona. While in Phoenix, she also broadcast on KPHO-TV, at one point having three programs on the two stations.

Godfrey moved to ABC-TV in 1953 to become host of Up for Adoption, which debuted on 20 stations on January 16, 1954. On July 26 of that year, she began a five-minute news program on WPIX television in New York. Also in 1954, she was host of On Your Way, a quiz program on ABC-TV on which she interviewed people who had an urgent need for money to go somewhere. Contestants who answered questions correctly received the money that they needed. Newspaper Enterprise Association columnist Dick Kleiner described the program as "a poor show", the format of which once changed twice in three weeks. Godfrey herself later referred to the show as "the worst."

In 1955, Godfrey was host of The Kathy Godfrey Show, a weekly 25-minute variety program on CBS Radio. That program ended on May 19, 1956, replaced by This Is Kathy Godfrey, a daily interview program, beginning on May 21, 1956, also on CBS. Aimed at busy housewives, the show's guests included Ilka Chase, Babe Didrikson Zaharias, and the postmaster of New York City.

Godfrey moved to Hartford, Connecticut, in 1957 and was host of the news-talk program Connecticut Life and Children's Talent Show on WHCT-TV. In the early 1960s, she was host of Let's Face It on WTXL radio in West Springfield, Massachusetts.

In 1962, G. P. Putnam's Sons published Genius in the Family, a book by Godfrey and her sister, Jean Godfrey. A reviewer for The Arizona Republic described the book as "a delightful account of Godfrey family life" that focuses primarily on the authors' mother.

== Personal life ==
Godfrey married Dr. Robert Ripley, a pediatrician in 1937. At the time of her death, she was married to Thomas J. McCann.

== Death ==
On February 4, 1981, Godfrey died in a Miami hospital after suffering a heart attack. She was 66.
