= Marian Calabro =

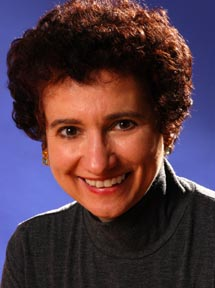
Calabro Marian

Marian Calabro is an author and publisher of history books and the founder and president of CorporateHistory.net, which produces corporate histories.

== Author ==
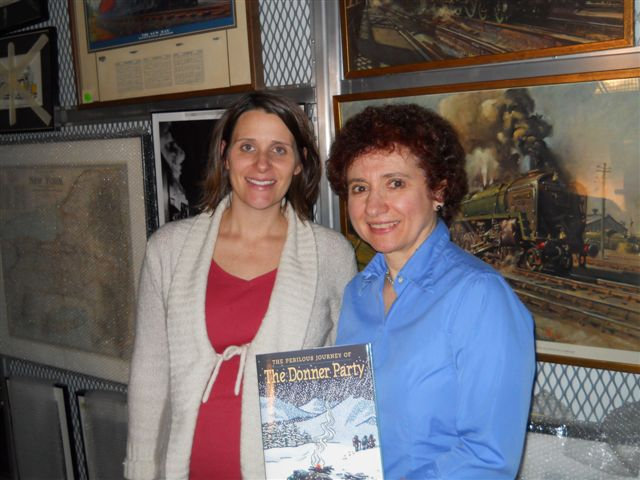
Marian Calabro (right) with "Mysteries at the Museum" Donner Party segment producer Alexis Siggers, 2012

Calabro began her career at Dell Publishing and the film company Learning Corporation of America. Her earliest books, written for young adults, include Operation Grizzly Bear (about wildlife biologists Frank and John Craighead; on the International Reading Association’s Young Adults Choices list, 1991), Great Courtroom Lawyers: Fighting the Cases that Made History, and Zap! A Brief History of Television.

The Perilous Journey of the Donner Party, Calabro's chronicle of the westward-bound Donner Party pioneers who resorted to cannibalism in winter of 1846–47, broke through to adult audiences. Booklist described it as "a combination of well-researched factual detail, a gripping narrative, strong characterizations, and a thoughtful analysis of the historical record". It is listed as one of the recommended readings in the John F. Kennedy Library's One Country, Many Voices: Cultural Connections to Our History, An Annotated Bibliography for Grades 6-8.

She was a featured author in the Historical Literacy Conference at the University of Delaware.

== Corporate historian ==
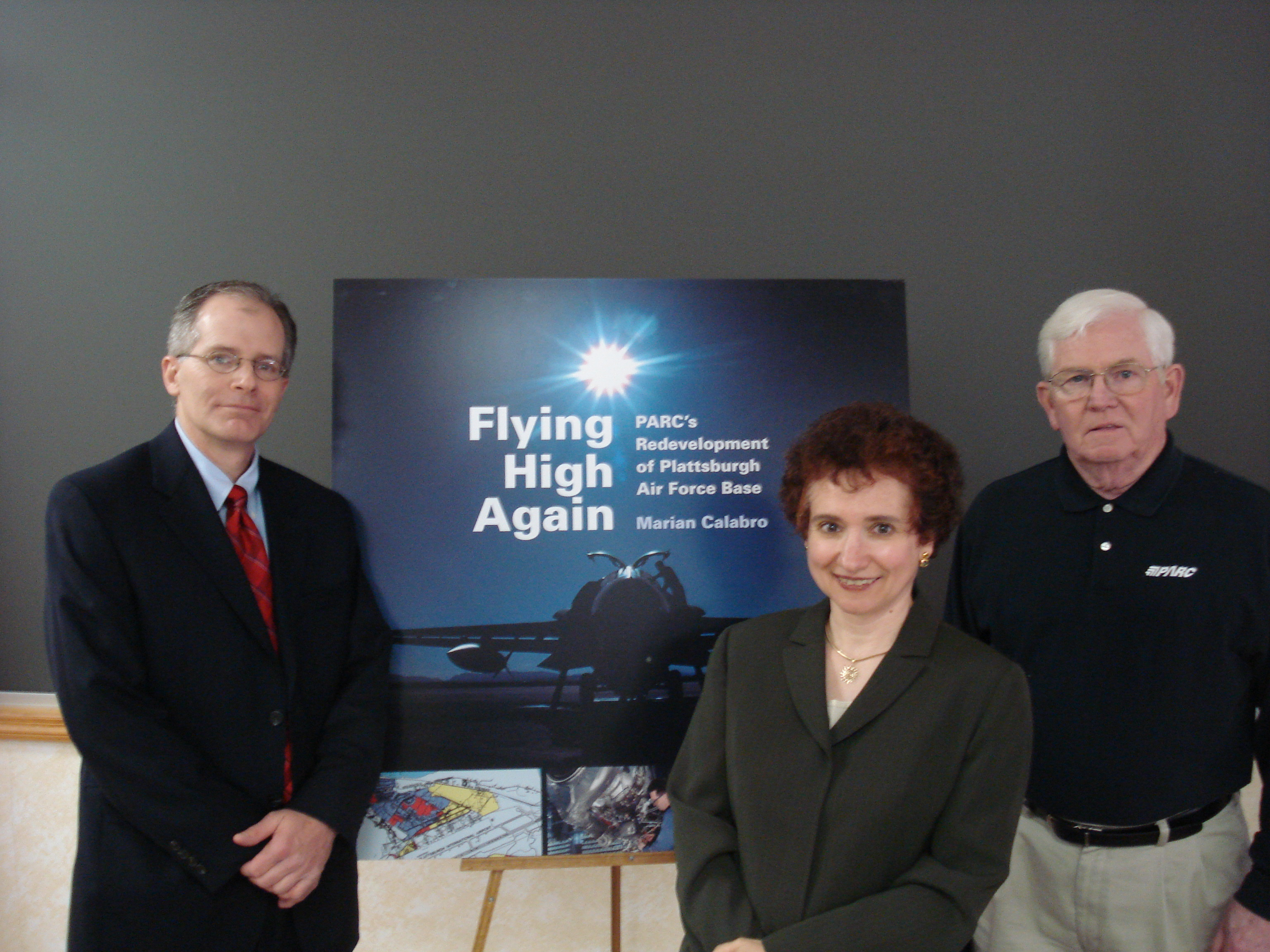
Bruce Steadman, Marian Calabro, and Dennis Doyle at the PARC book launch, May 2008

Calabro established a publishing firm, CorporateHistory.net, which produces printed and multimedia histories based on documentary research and oral history interviews. Calabro believes this sort of research and writing performs an important historical function:

Often, the American dream is told through the stories of these businesses. ... Every company has crises, and naturally no company wants to trumpet its mistakes, but a good corporate history owns up to the crises and represents them as turning points and lessons learned.

Her book on the Melwood Horticultural Training Center not only relates the 40-year history of a private agency serving adults with developmental disabilities, but includes reflections on running a nonprofit organization by her co-author, Melwood’s President Emeritus Earl Copus.

Flying High Again outlines the key issues faced by the Plattsburgh Airbase Redevelopment Corporation (PARC) during the rapid and successful redevelopment of the Plattsburgh Air Force Base. Gilbert Duken, chairman of the Board of Directors, noted that he and other members of PARC "agreed that other communities facing similar circumstances might benefit from a written account of PARC’s experiences".

According to the company website, several of their books have won Apex awards.

For a book celebrating the fiftieth anniversary of Northwest Community Hospital in Arlington Heights, IL, the focus was on the individuals and groups who form the backbone of the hospital. "People are really at the heart of any organization," says Calabro. "We like to be able to tell their stories with lots of visuals that link the past to the present." Among the sources for this chronicle were newspaper clippings, board minutes, letters, historic artifacts, and architectural drawings.

After writing a book for Pep Boys, Calabro appeared on The History Channel’s Modern Marvels series in “The Auto Store” (aired 10/5/2005), which included the story of Pep Boys and other auto-parts companies.

Other clients of CorporateHistory.net include Advance Auto Parts, A. W. Hastings & Co., Clinton County ARC, Dominion Resources, M.C. Dean, Inc., The Clorox Company, and Towers Watson, for which it created a history book for internal use called Our Family Tree: The Towers Watson Story.

Calabro is a graduate of Rutgers University, where she was in the first class of women admitted to Rutgers College and was elected to Phi Beta Kappa society. A native of Kearny, New Jersey, she lives and works in Hasbrouck Heights, New Jersey. She has been quoted on business subjects by USA Today, the Washington Post, and other media.
