= Scott Slutzker =

American football player (born 1972)

No. 84, 81
- Position: Tight end

Personal information
- Born: December 20, 1972 (age 53); Oakland, California, U.S.
- Listed height: 6 ft 4 in (1.93 m)
- Listed weight: 250 lb (113 kg)

Career information
- High school: Hasbrouck Heights (Hasbrouck Heights, New Jersey)
- College: Iowa
- NFL draft: 1996: 3rd round, 82nd overall pick

Career history
- Indianapolis Colts (1996–1997); New Orleans Saints (1998–1999); New York Jets (2001)*
- * Offseason or practice squad member only

Awards and highlights
- Second-team All-Big Ten (1995)

Career NFL statistics
- Receptions: 15
- Receiving yards: 196
- Receiving touchdowns: 1
- Stats at Pro Football Reference

Scott Lawrence Slutzker (born December 20, 1972) is an American former professional football player who was a tight end in the National Football League (NFL). He was selected by the Indianapolis Colts in the third round of the 1996 NFL draft. He played college football for the Iowa Hawkeyes from 1991 to 1995.

== Biography ==
Growing up in Hasbrouck Heights, New Jersey, he attended Hasbrouck Heights High School, where he was a three-sport athlete, excelling at basketball and baseball as well as football. Slutzker was a first-team all-league selection in both baseball and basketball his senior year and was an All-American in football. His high school football statistics include: 1,572 career receiving yards on 102 receptions, 14 touchdowns on offense. On defense, Slutzker was a 3-year starter who recorded 171 tackles, 16 interceptions (4 for touchdowns) and 14 fumble recoveries. In his senior year in high school he also handled the team's punting, place kicking and punt returning duties. His high school football accolades include North Jersey's All-time college football team, two-time All-county tight end (Bergen County) and All-state honors, he also played in the New Jersey North-South All-star Classic.

He is one of few to score over 1,000 points (1,642) and record over 1,000 rebounds (1,222) for his high school basketball team. As a baseball player, Slutzker was also a standout as a first baseman, having several professional tryouts in high school including the New York Yankees, New York Mets, Chicago Cubs, Minnesota Twins and Kansas City Royals. Slutzker is Jewish.

In his years at the University of Iowa, Slutzker redshirted as a freshman. He saw extensive time playing the next season on special teams in his first year of eligibility, earning his first of four letters in football. As a sophomore, he split time starting but had a breakout year competing at tight-end with 29 receptions for 307 yards and 2 touchdowns earning him All-Big Ten honorable mention honors. The 1994 season had Slutzker starting at tight end and was leading the Big Ten in receptions through 5 games including his Chevrolet Player of the Game performance versus then No. 7 Michigan on October 1, 1994 . Unfortunately, the ankle injury sustained in that game forced him to miss the next 2 games however he finished the season with another strong year totaling 27 receptions for 379 yards including 2 touchdowns in 9 games. He earned 3rd team All-Big Ten Honors for his efforts. In his senior year as a Hawkeye, 1995 brought another strong performance by Slutzker. His 8 reception, 167-yard game vs then No. 19 Penn State still stands as the best receiving performance vs Iowa. Slutzker's 39 receptions for 575 yards including 1 touchdown completed his best year of his collegiate career. His career totals of 95 receptions for 1,261 yards and 5 touchdowns place him 3rd on Iowa's all-time tight ends list. In his final season, he was selected to the 2nd team All-Big Ten as a tight end and All-American accolades in several publications. He also turned down multiple full scholarship offers from several schools to play football at the University of Iowa., most notably Notre Dame.

In the 1996 NFL draft, he was selected in the 3rd round (82nd overall pick) by the Indianapolis Colts. The tight end position was crowded with considerable talent with 1995 second-round pick at tight end, Ken Dilger, who was a pro bowler in his rookie season and future pro bowl tight end Marcus Pollard also on the roster which relegated Slutzker to special teams and short yardage/goal-line situations. After being traded to the New Orleans Saints in 1998, Slutzker found himself in a similar situation behind second round pick and 1998 NFC Pro Bowl tight end Cam Cleeland. He played 41 games over four seasons in the NFL with the Colts and the New Orleans Saints, and spent one preseason (2001) with the New York Jets.

Slutzker is the son of Sharon and Lawrence Slutzker. He has an older sister who was also a standout track athlete in high school and college. He is married with two children.

== See also ==
- List of select Jewish football players
