= Hasbrouck Heights School District =

School district in Bergen County, New Jersey, US

Address
- 379 Boulevard Hasbrouck Heights, Bergen County, New Jersey, 07604; United States
- Coordinates: 40.867208°N 74.072963°W

District information
- Grades: PreK-12
- Superintendent: Jillian Torrento
- Business administrator: Jenine Murray
- Schools: 4

Students and staff
- Enrollment: 1,694 (as of 2023–24)
- Faculty: 138.8 FTEs
- Student–teacher ratio: 12.2:1

Other information
- District Factor Group: FG
- Website: www.hhschools.org
Ind.	Per pupil	District spending	Rank (*)	K-12 average	%± vs. average
1A	Total Spending	$15,127	5	$18,891	−19.9%
1	Budgetary Cost	12,134	9	14,783	−17.9%
2	Classroom Instruction	7,328	13	8,763	−16.4%
6	Support Services	1,930	23	2,392	−19.3%
8	Administrative Cost	1,253	7	1,485	−15.6%
10	Operations & Maintenance	1,219	5	1,783	−31.6%
13	Extracurricular Activities	396	37	268	47.8%
16	Median Teacher Salary	66,618	48	64,043
Data from NJDoE 2014 Taxpayers' Guide to Education Spending. *Of K-12 districts with 1,800-3,500 students. Lowest spending=1; Highest=68

The Hasbrouck Heights School District is a comprehensive community public school district that serves students in pre-kindergarten through twelfth grade from Hasbrouck Heights and Teterboro, in Bergen County, in the U.S. state of New Jersey. The district serves students from Teterboro, a non-operating district that was merged into the Hasbrouck Heights School District following its dissolution on July 1, 2010.

As of the 2023–24 school year, the district, comprised of four schools, had an enrollment of 1,694 students and 138.8 classroom teachers (on an FTE basis), for a student–teacher ratio of 12.2:1.

The district had been classified by the New Jersey Department of Education as being in District Factor Group "FG", the fourth-highest of eight groupings. District Factor Groups organize districts statewide to allow comparison by common socioeconomic characteristics of the local districts. From lowest socioeconomic status to highest, the categories are A, B, CD, DE, FG, GH, I and J.

== Awards and recognition ==
For the 2005–06 school year, Lincoln School was one of 22 schools statewide selected as Governor's School of Excellence Winners, an award given to schools that have demonstrated significant improvement over the previous two academic years.

== Schools ==
Schools in the district (with 2023–24 enrollment data from the National Center for Education Statistics) are:

Elementary schools

- Euclid Elementary School with 374 students in grades PreK–5
  - Michael A. Sickels, principal
- Lincoln Elementary School with 381 students in grades PreK–5
  - Joseph C. Colangelo, principal

Middle school

- Hasbrouck Heights Middle School with 395 students in grades 6–8
  - Joseph Mastropietro, principal

High school

- Hasbrouck Heights High School with 514 students in grades 9–12
  - Vincenzo Barchini, principal

== Administration ==
Core members of the district's administration are:

- Jillian Torrento, superintendent
- Jenine Murray, business administrator and board secretary

== Board of education ==
The district's board of education is comprised of nine members who set policy and oversee the fiscal and educational operation of the district through its administration. As a Type II school district, the board's trustees are elected directly by voters to serve three-year terms of office on a staggered basis, with three seats up for election each year held (since 2012) as part of the November general election. The board appoints a superintendent to oversee the district's day-to-day operations and a business administrator to supervise the business functions of the district.
