= Living on Earth =

Syndicated environmental news radio program produced at the University of Massachusetts

- Genre: News: Environmental news, journalism, features, analysis, interviews
- Country of origin: United States
- Language: English
- Syndicates: Public Radio Exchange
- Hosted by: Steve Curwood
- Created by: Steve Curwood
- Original release: April 5, 1991 – present
- Audio format: Stereophonic
- Website: loe.org
- Podcast: loe.org/podcast.rss

Living on Earth is a weekly, hour-long and award-winning environmental news program distributed by the Public Radio Exchange (on Public Radio International from October 6, 2006, show to December 6, 2019, show, and before that, NPR from 1991 until 2006). Hosted by Steve Curwood, the program features interviews and commentary on a broad range of ecological issues, exploring how humans interact with their landscape. The show airs on over 300 public radio stations nationwide and reaches 80% of the United States. It is produced and recorded at the University of Massachusetts Boston. As an independent media program, Living on Earth (LOE) relies entirely on contributions from listeners and institutions supporting public service including PRI affiliates and PRI. In previous years, the program had been distributed by National Public Radio. Living on Earth is currently based at the University of Massachusetts Boston.

The program has received numerous awards including:

The 2005 Science Journalism Award from the American Association for the Advancement of Science, the Radio and Television News Directors Association's Edward R. Murrow Award, Society of Environmental Journalists' 2002 First Place Award for Reporting on the Environment, and Gracie Allen Awards from the Foundation of American Women in Radio and Television.
