= Curwood Festival =

Annual festival

Coordinates: 42°59′46″N 84°10′28″W

- Status: active
- Frequency: Annually
- Location: Owosso, Michigan
- Country: United States
- Website: www.curwoodfestival.com

The Curwood Festival is a celebration of the American novelist James Oliver Curwood in Owosso, Michigan. Many of his novels were written in Curwood Castle on the banks of the Shiawassee River.

== History ==
The annual Curwood Festival started on the 100th anniversary (June 1978) of the birth of James Oliver Curwood. Curwood lived in Owosso (508 W. Williams Street Owosso, now the Curwood Hoddy House) and was a famous author and conservationist. Curwood built the Curwood Castle for his writing studio and left it as a gift to Owosso. Curwood wrote 33 nature adventure books and out of those, approximately over 200 movies were made based on his novels and short stories. Some of the movies were premiered in Owosso. Most of his books were based in Canada. The festival was started to celebrate Curwood's contribution to the community.

== Dates ==
The Curwood opening ceremony is held outside of Curwood Castle, the first full weekend of June. The Curwood Festival takes place outside the Owosso City Hall and the Owosso fire and police departments. The Curwood Heritage Parade takes place on Michigan (M-21) Main Street in Owosso, from Dewey Street to Chipman Street in West Town Owosso. The Kids in Curwood Parade takes place right outside of Emerson Elementary school and proceeds to downtown Owosso.

== Events ==
There are several other events that happen during the Curwood Festival. One is the Curwood Saga Writing Contest. Every year the contest has a theme having something to do with nature, like all of James Oliver Curwood books. They have carnival rides and games along with vendors selling assortment of crafts. One event brought back from earlier festivals is the River Daze, where contestants race down-river. Each year behind the castle is a Michigan/Shiawassee County Time Line, (Michigan surveyor's, Black Smith, Revolutionary War reenactment, and Civil War Reenactment.)

Between Curwood Castle and the Judge Ellis Comstock Cabin is the Arts and Crafts show. Carpetbaggers Row Is on exchange Street Parking lot. There are rides on Water Street and behind the Owosso Public Safety Building. The Entertainment Tent is also behind the Public Safety Building. There are food vendors next to the Public Safety Building, Carpetbaggers Row and near the Curwood Castle. Before the Festival is the Curwood Writing Saga Contest, Beautiful Baby Contest, and Curwood Festival Queen and Princess contest.

Thursday Night is opening Ceremonies at Curwood Castle.

Friday Night is the Kids in Curwood Country Parade.

Saturday Morning is Pancake Breakfast at Owosso Middle School, Heritage parade steps off at 2:00 pm. River Daze follows the Heritage Parade, as does the Mr. Owosso Contest.

Sunday, Kids day.

There is Kids Fishing Derby, Cat Contest, and Dog Flyer Contest.

2017 Event Applications
