= Curwood Castle =

Historic house in Michigan, United States

- U.S. National Register of Historic Places
- Michigan State Historic Site
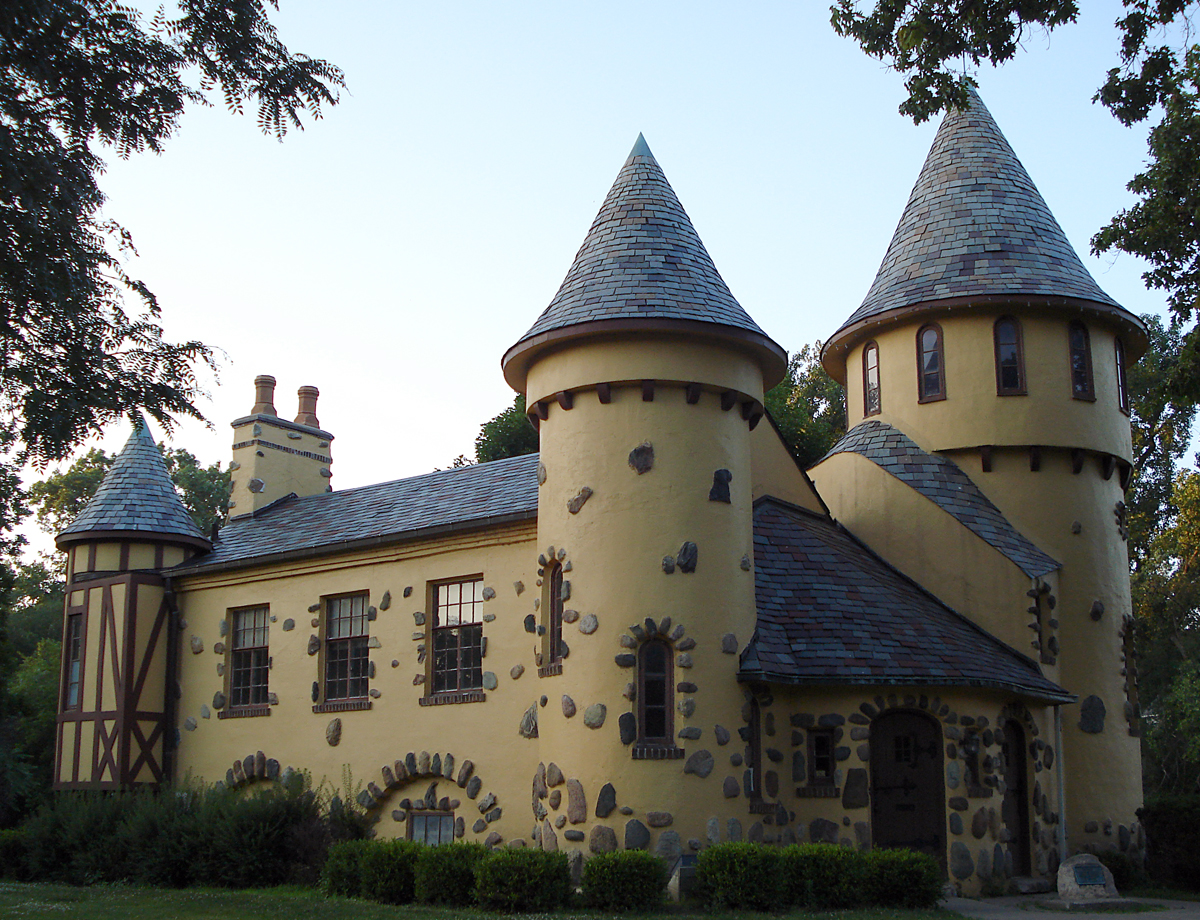
- Curwood Castle

- Location within Michigan Location within the United States
- Interactive map
- Location: 224 Curwood Castle Drive; Owosso, Michigan
- Coordinates: 42°59′58″N 84°10′31″W
- Area: less than 1-acre (0.40 ha)
- Built: 1922
- Architectural style: French manor
- NRHP reference No.: 71000420

Significant dates
- Added to NRHP: September 03, 1971
- Designated MSHS: April 24, 1970

Curwood Castle is a small castle, now a museum, located in Owosso, Michigan, built by the author James Oliver Curwood.

== History ==
James Curwood was born in Owosso, Michigan on June 12, 1878. He spent much of his early life out of doors, and at a young age left to tour the South on a bicycle. He eventually returned to Michigan, attended the University of Michigan for two years, and went to work as a reporter and later editor at the Detroit Tribune. In 1907, Curwood returned to Owosso to focus on writing, and the next year published his first novel.

In 1923, Curwood built this replica of a Norman chateau along the banks of the Shiawassee River near his mother's home in Owosso. Construction on the building began in 1923 and was completed in 1924. Curwood used the Castle as his writing studio and office. Curwood lived with his family on the other side of the river on the corner of Williams and Mulberry Street (Now M-52).

Curwood later became a zealous conservationist and was appointed to the Michigan Conservation Commission in 1926. He died a year later at age 49 on August 13, 1927. In his will, Curwood bestowed the Castle to the City of Owosso. It has served in various roles over the years and is now a museum operated by the city and is open to the public from April through December on Tuesdays through Sundays from 1:00 pm to 5:00 pm. The Castle closed for the winter season each year from January 1, through February and reopens for the year sometime in March. Each year, the city of Owosso hosts the Curwood Festival the first full weekend in June. The Curwood Festival is a non-profit organization run by volunteers and one paid staff member, the volunteers created the festival to celebrate the life and works of James Oliver Curwood.

Curwood Castle is closed Mondays, and these holidays, Independence Day, Thanksgiving Day, Christmas Day, and New Year's Day, The Months of January through February.

== Description ==
Curwood Castle is a romantic interpretation of a Norman chateau. It has an irregular plan with spires at three corners. It has a slate-covered gable roof with chimneys, linked at the base, extending from the rear gable facade. The exterior is made of yellow stucco containing decorative, randomly spaced fieldstones Curwood chose himself. The front facade has an entrance, framed with fieldstone, between two spires, covered with a projecting shed roof.
