= Steve Curwood =

Massachusetts USA journalist

- Born: December 11, 1947 (age 78); Roxbury, Massachusetts
- Education: Harvard College
- Occupation: Journalist
- Parent(s): Sarah Thomas Curwood and James Lawrence Curwood

Stephen Thomas Curwood (born in Roxbury, Massachusetts on December 11, 1947) is a journalist, author, public radio personality and actor.

While working for The Boston Globe as an investigative reporter and columnist he shared the 1975 Pulitzer Prize for Public Service as part of The Boston Globe's education team.

His production credits in public broadcasting include reporter and host for NPR's Weekend All Things Considered, host of NPR's World of Opera, producer for the PBS series The Advocates with Michael Dukakis, and creator, host and executive producer of Living on Earth, the prize-winning weekly environmental radio program heard for more than 35 years on public radio stations and distributed by Public Radio International (PRI) since 2006.

Acting roles include Randall in the Loeb Drama Center's production of Slow Dance on the Killing Ground.

A lifelong Quaker, Curwood lives at his family's farm in the Seacoast region of New Hampshire .

Curwood is the author of the nonfiction book, An Uncommon Hero: One Mother Who Fought to Protect Her Child from Sexual Abuse.
