= Hasbrouck Heights, New Jersey =

Borough in Bergen County, New Jersey, US

- Borough
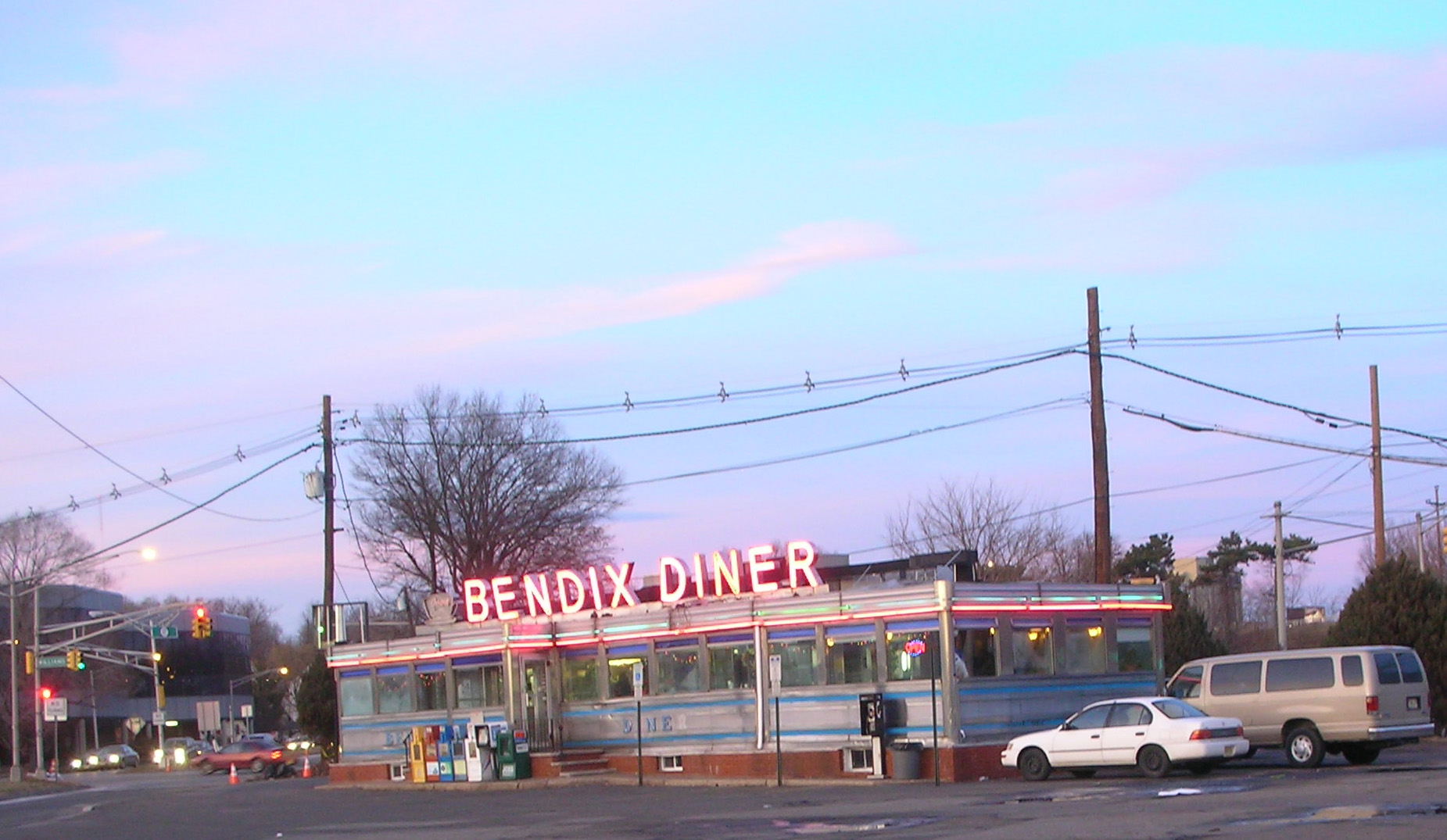
- The Bendix Diner, a landmark on Route 17

- Location of Hasbrouck Heights in Bergen County highlighted in red (left). Inset map: Location of Bergen County in New Jersey highlighted in orange (right).

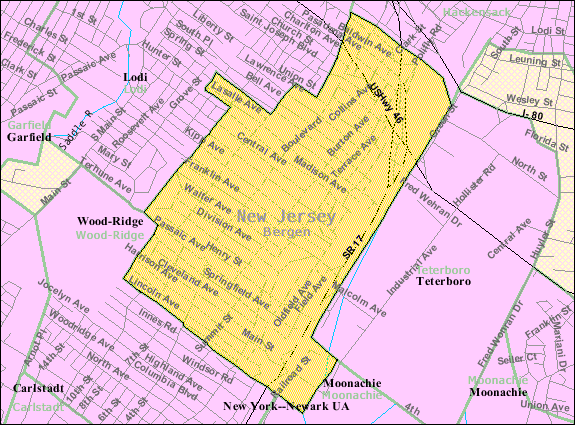
- Census Bureau map of Hasbrouck Heights, New Jersey

- Location in Bergen County Location in New Jersey Location in the United States
- Coordinates: 40.862751°N 74.075182°W
- Country: United States
- State: New Jersey
- County: Bergen
- Incorporated: August 2, 1894
- Named for: J. D. Hasbrouck

Government
  - Type: Borough
  - Body: Borough Council
  - Mayor: Ronald F. Kistner (R, term ends December 31, 2027)
  - Administrator: Robert Brady
  - Municipal clerk: Michelle Sery

Area
  - Total: 1.53 sq mi (3.95 km^{2})
  - Land: 1.53 sq mi (3.95 km^{2})
  - Water: 0.0039 sq mi (0.01 km^{2}) 0.20%
  - Rank: 449th of 565 in state 58th of 70 in county
- Elevation: 112 ft (34 m)

Population (2020)
  - Total: 12,125
  - Estimate (2024): 12,253
  - Rank: 209th of 565 in state 29th of 70 in county
  - Density: 7,961.3/sq mi (3,073.9/km^{2})
  - Rank: 52nd of 565 in state 15th of 70 in county
- Time zone: UTC−05:00 (Eastern (EST))
  - Summer (DST): UTC−04:00 (Eastern (EDT))
- ZIP Code: 07604
- Area code: 201 exchanges: 288, 393, 462, 727
- FIPS code: 3400330420
- GNIS feature ID: 0885247
- Website: hasbrouck-heightsnj.org

Hasbrouck Heights (English pronunciation: /ˈhæzbɹʊk/) is a borough in Bergen County, in the U.S. state of New Jersey. As of the 2020 United States census, the borough's population was 12,125, an increase of 283 (+2.4%) from the 2010 census count of 11,842, which in turn reflected an increase of 180 (+1.5%) from the 11,662 counted in the 2000 census. An inner-ring suburb of New York City, Hasbrouck Heights is located approximately 10 miles (16 km) northwest of Midtown Manhattan and 8 miles (13 km) west of Upper Manhattan.

The borough was listed as the third-safest place in New Jersey as well as the eighth-safest municipality in the nation according to a 2022 crime statistic compilation from Safewise.com.

== History ==
The area that would become the borough had been known as Corona from the mid-1800s and grew up around the two local railroad stations. The name "Hasbrouck" was chosen in 1889 to honor Jacob Dillon Hasbrouck (1842–1918), general manager of the New Jersey and New York Railroad. In the face of local opposition, the name change was promoted as improving the community's public perception and avoiding confusion with the Corona, Queens neighborhood, while "Heights" was added to avoid confusion with a similarly named community in upstate New York.

Hasbrouck Heights was formed by an act of the New Jersey Legislature on August 2, 1894, based on the passage of a referendum on July 31, 1894, and was created from portions of Lodi Township at the height of the "Boroughitis" phenomenon then sweeping through Bergen County. A part of the borough was annexed to Lodi in 1901.

== Geography ==
According to the United States Census Bureau, the borough had a total area of 1.53 square miles (3.95 km^{2}), including 1.52 square miles (3.95 km^{2}) of land and <0.01 square miles (0.01 km^{2}) of water (0.20%).

The borough borders Hackensack, Lodi, Moonachie, Teterboro and Wood-Ridge.

== Demographics ==
Historical population
Census	Pop.	Note	%±
1900	1,255		—
1910	2,155		71.7%
1920	2,895		34.3%
1930	5,658		95.4%
1940	6,716		18.7%
1950	9,181		36.7%
1960	13,046		42.1%
1970	13,651		4.6%
1980	12,166		−10.9%
1990	11,488		−5.6%
2000	11,662		1.5%
2010	11,842		1.5%
2020	12,125		2.4%
2024 (est.)	12,253	▲	1.1%
Population sources: 1900–1920 1900–1910; 1910–1930 1900–2020; 2000 2010 2020

=== Racial and ethnic composition ===
Hasbrouck Heights borough, Bergen County, New Jersey – Racial and ethnic composition Note: the US Census treats Hispanic/Latino as an ethnic category. This table excludes Latinos from the racial categories and assigns them to a separate category. Hispanics/Latinos may be of any race.
Race / Ethnicity (NH = Non-Hispanic)	Pop 2000	Pop 2010	Pop 2020	% 2000	% 2010	% 2020
White alone (NH)	9,611	8,445	7,466	82.41%	71.31%	61.58%
Black or African American alone (NH)	188	293	333	1.61%	2.47%	2.75%
Native American or Alaska Native alone (NH)	3	7	7	0.03%	0.06%	0.06%
Asian alone (NH)	771	1,169	1,421	6.61%	9.87%	11.72%
Native Hawaiian or Pacific Islander alone (NH)	1	2	1	0.01%	0.02%	0.01%
Other race alone (NH)	17	27	73	0.15%	0.23%	0.60%
Mixed race or Multiracial (NH)	107	139	273	0.92%	1.17%	2.25%
Hispanic or Latino (any race)	964	1,760	2,551	8.27%	14.86%	21.04%
Total	11,662	11,842	12,125	100.00%	100.00%	100.00%

=== 2020 census ===
As of the 2020 census, Hasbrouck Heights had a population of 12,125. The median age was 43.2 years. 20.2% of residents were under the age of 18 and 18.5% of residents were 65 years of age or older. For every 100 females there were 93.7 males, and for every 100 females age 18 and over there were 91.1 males age 18 and over.

100.0% of residents lived in urban areas, while 0.0% lived in rural areas.

There were 4,535 households in Hasbrouck Heights, of which 32.3% had children under the age of 18 living in them. Of all households, 54.4% were married-couple households, 15.1% were households with a male householder and no spouse or partner present, and 26.0% were households with a female householder and no spouse or partner present. About 24.8% of all households were made up of individuals and 11.6% had someone living alone who was 65 years of age or older.

There were 4,715 housing units, of which 3.8% were vacant. The homeowner vacancy rate was 0.5% and the rental vacancy rate was 5.3%.

=== 2010 census ===
The 2010 United States census counted 11,842 people, 4,433 households, and 3,187 families in the borough. The population density was 7,865.4 per square mile (3,036.8/km^{2}). There were 4,627 housing units at an average density of 3,073.2 per square mile (1,186.6/km^{2}). The racial makeup was 81.34% (9,632) White, 2.86% (339) Black or African American, 0.08% (9) Native American, 9.99% (1,183) Asian, 0.02% (2) Pacific Islander, 3.68% (436) from other races, and 2.04% (241) from two or more races. Hispanic or Latino of any race were 14.86% (1,760) of the population.

Of the 4,433 households, 31.5% had children under the age of 18; 57.4% were married couples living together; 10.6% had a female householder with no husband present and 28.1% were non-families. Of all households, 24.5% were made up of individuals and 10.7% had someone living alone who was 65 years of age or older. The average household size was 2.67 and the average family size was 3.22. Same-sex couples headed 9 households in 2010, less than half of the 19 counted in 2000.

22.3% of the population were under the age of 18, 7.0% from 18 to 24, 25.8% from 25 to 44, 29.9% from 45 to 64, and 15.0% who were 65 years of age or older. The median age was 41.8 years. For every 100 females, the population had 92.7 males. For every 100 females ages 18 and older there were 89.4 males.

The Census Bureau's 2006–2010 American Community Survey showed that (in 2010 inflation-adjusted dollars) median household income was $88,375 (with a margin of error of +/− $7,467) and the median family income was $100,264 (+/− $9,917). Males had a median income of $60,618 (+/− $5,446) versus $47,385 (+/− $6,455) for females. The per capita income for the borough was $37,428 (+/− $3,231). About 3.6% of families and 3.8% of the population were below the poverty line, including 2.6% of those under age 18 and 5.1% of those age 65 or over.

=== 2000 census ===
As of the 2000 United States census there were 11,662 people, 4,521 households, and 3,142 families residing in the borough. The population density was 7,735.0 inhabitants per square mile (2,986.5/km^{2}). There were 4,617 housing units at an average density of 3,062.3 per square mile (1,182.4/km^{2}). The racial makeup of the borough was 87.87% White, 1.71% African American, 0.04% Native American, 6.65% Asian, 0.01% Pacific Islander, 2.19% from other races, and 1.53% from two or more races. Hispanic or Latino of any race were 8.27% of the population.

There were 4,521 households, out of which 30.8% had children under the age of 18 living with them, 57.1% were married couples living together, 9.4% had a female householder with no husband present, and 30.5% were non-families. 26.2% of all households were made up of individuals, and 11.7% had someone living alone who was 65 years of age or older. The average household size was 2.58 and the average family size was 3.16.

In the borough the population was spread out, with 22.2% under the age of 18, 6.5% from 18 to 24, 29.9% from 25 to 44, 24.4% from 45 to 64, and 17.0% who were 65 years of age or older. The median age was 40 years. For every 100 females, there were 92.5 males. For every 100 females age 18 and over, there were 89.6 males.

The median income for a household in the borough was $64,529, and the median income for a family was $75,032. Males had a median income of $51,328 versus $40,570 for females. The per capita income for the borough was $29,626. About 2.1% of families and 4.2% of the population were below the poverty line, including 6.5% of those under age 18 and 4.5% of those age 65 or over.

== Government ==
=== Local government ===
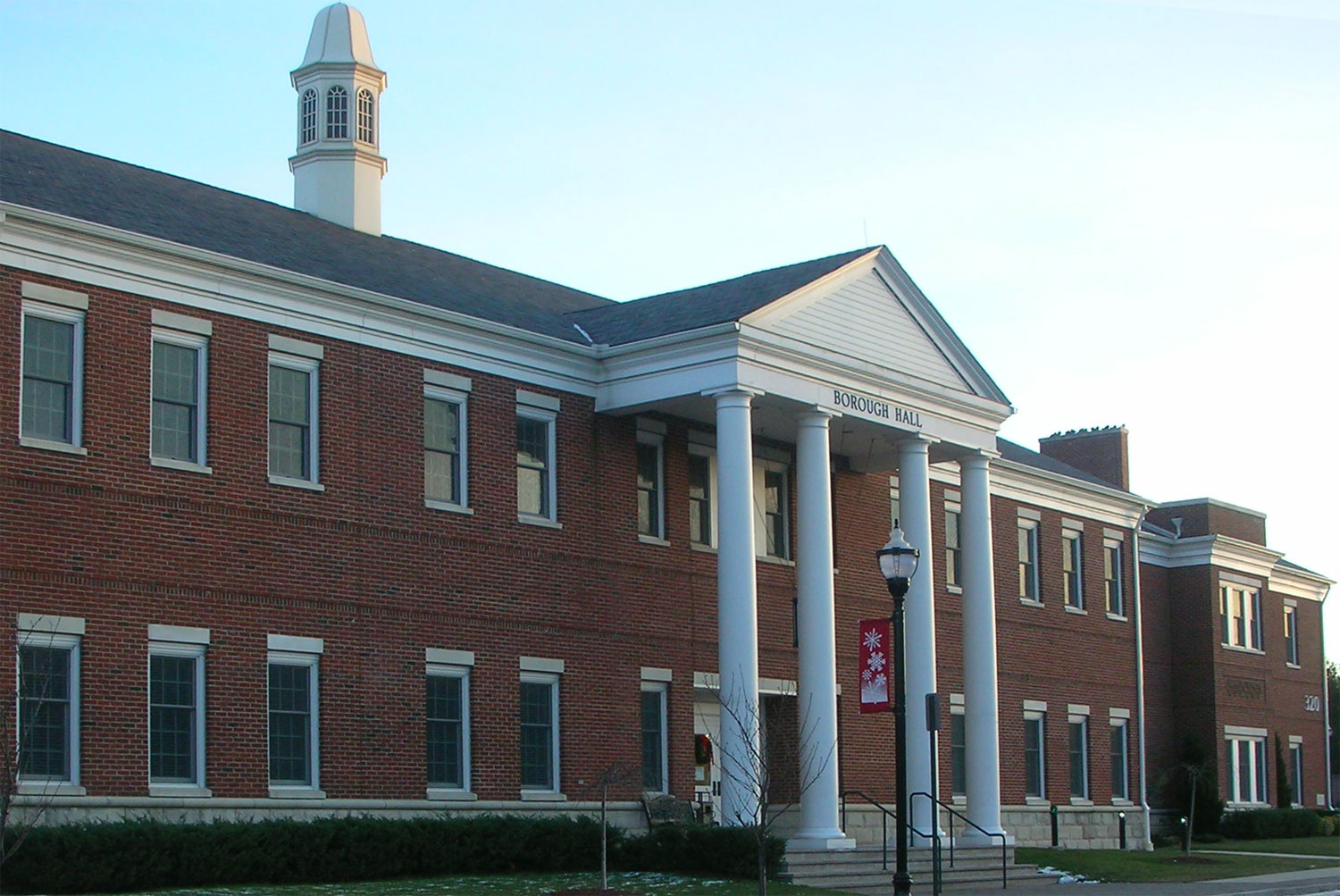
Borough Hall (January 2009)

Hasbrouck Heights is governed under the borough form of New Jersey municipal government, which is used in 218 municipalities (of the 564) statewide, making it the most common form of government in New Jersey. The governing body is comprised of a mayor and a borough council, with all positions elected at-large on a partisan basis as part of the November general election. A mayor is elected directly by the voters to a four-year term of office. The borough council includes six members elected to serve three-year terms on a staggered basis, with two seats coming up for election each year in a three-year cycle. The borough form of government used by Hasbrouck Heights, the most commonly used system in the state, is a "weak mayor / strong council" government in which council members act as the legislative body with the mayor presiding at meetings and voting only in the event of a tie. The mayor can veto ordinances subject to an override by a two-thirds majority vote of the council. The mayor makes committee and liaison assignments for council members, and most appointments are made by the mayor with the advice and consent of the council.

As of 2024, the mayor of Hasbrouck Heights is Republican Ronald F. Kistner, whose term of office ends December 31, 2027. Members of the Hasbrouck Heights Borough Council are Robert Bing (R, 2024), Susan B. McGuire (R, 2025), Thomas Meli (R, 2024), Joseph Samperi (R, 2025; appointed to serve an unexpired term), Michael Sickels (R, 2026) and Charlotte Sodora (R, 2026).

Joseph Samperi was appointed in January 2024 to fill the council seat expiring in December 2025 that had been held by Ron Kistner until he stepped down to take office as mayor. Samperi will serve on an interim basis until the November 2024 general election, when voters will choose a candidate to serve the balance of the term of office.

=== Federal, state and county representation ===
Hasbrouck Heights is located in the 9th Congressional District and is part of New Jersey's 38th state legislative district.

For the 119th United States Congress, New Jersey's 9th congressional district is represented by Nellie Pou (D, North Haledon) New Jersey is represented in the United States Senate by Democrats Cory Booker (Newark, term ends 2027) and Andy Kim (Moorestown, term ends 2031).

For the 2026–2027 session, the 38th legislative district of the New Jersey Legislature is represented in the State Senate by Joseph Lagana (D, Paramus) and in the General Assembly by Lisa Swain (D, Fair Lawn) and Chris Tully (D, Bergenfield).

Bergen County is governed by a directly elected County Executive, with legislative functions performed by a Board of County Commissioners comprised of seven members who are elected at-large to three-year terms in partisan elections on a staggered basis, with either two or three seats coming up for election each November; a Chairman and Vice Chairman are selected from among its seven members at a reorganization meeting held every January. As of 2025, the county executive is James J. Tedesco III (D, Paramus), whose four-year term of office ends December 31, 2026.

Bergen County's Commissioners are Chair Mary J. Amoroso (D, Mahwah, 2025), Vice Chair Steven A. Tanelli (D, North Arlington, 2027), Chair Pro Tem Joan Voss (D, Fort Lee, 2026), Rafael Marte (D, Bergenfield, 2026), Germaine M. Ortiz (D, Emerson, 2025), Thomas J. Sullivan Jr. (D, Montvale, 2025) and Tracy Silna Zur (D, Franklin Lakes, 2027).

Bergen County's elected constitutional officials are Clerk John S. Hogan (D, Northvale, 2026), Sheriff Anthony Cureton (D, Englewood, 2027) and Surrogate Michael R. Dressler (D, Cresskill, 2026).

=== Politics ===
As of March 2011, there were a total of 7,221 registered voters in Hasbrouck Heights, of which 1,630 (22.6% vs. 31.7% countywide) were registered as Democrats, 2,549 (35.3% vs. 21.1%) were registered as Republicans and 3,040 (42.1% vs. 47.1%) were registered as Unaffiliated. There were 2 voters registered as Libertarians or Greens. Among the borough's 2010 Census population, 61.0% (vs. 57.1% in Bergen County) were registered to vote, including 78.4% of those ages 18 and over (vs. 73.7% countywide).

Gubernatorial election results for Hasbrouck Heights
Year	Republican		Democratic		Third party(ies)	
Year	No.	%	No.	%	No.	%
2025	2,530	49.15%	2,590	50.31%	28	0.54%
2021	2,335	54.62%	1,917	44.84%	23	0.54%
2017	1,562	48.57%	1,600	49.75%	54	1.68%
2013	2,191	62.69%	1,272	36.39%	32	0.92%
2009	2,037	52.16%	1,663	42.59%	205	5.25%
2005	1,964	49.06%	1,926	48.11%	113	2.82%

In the 2016 presidential election, Republican Donald Trump received 3,126 votes (51.0% vs. 41.1% countywide), ahead of Democrat Hillary Clinton with 2,796 votes (45.7% vs. 54.2%) and other candidates with 205 votes (3.3% vs. 4.6%), among the 6,195 ballots cast by the borough's 8,119 registered voters, for a turnout of 76.3% (vs. 72.5% in Bergen County). In the 2012 presidential election, Democrat Barack Obama received 2,883 votes (51.1% vs. 54.8% countywide), ahead of Republican Mitt Romney with 2,669 votes (47.3% vs. 43.5%) and other candidates with 43 votes (0.8% vs. 0.9%), among the 5,640 ballots cast by the borough's 7,558 registered voters, for a turnout of 74.6% (vs. 70.4% in Bergen County). In the 2008 presidential election, Republican John McCain received 3,218 votes (52.9% vs. 44.5% countywide), ahead of Democrat Barack Obama with 2,772 votes (45.5% vs. 53.9%) and other candidates with 48 votes (0.8% vs. 0.8%), among the 6,087 ballots cast by the borough's 7,612 registered voters, for a turnout of 80.0% (vs. 76.8% in Bergen County). In the 2004 presidential election, Republican George W. Bush received 3,066 votes (53.2% vs. 47.2% countywide), ahead of Democrat John Kerry with 2,629 votes (45.6% vs. 51.7%) and other candidates with 53 votes (0.9% vs. 0.7%), among the 5,768 ballots cast by the borough's 7,345 registered voters, for a turnout of 78.5% (vs. 76.9% in the whole county).

Presidential elections results
Year	Republican	Democratic
2024	52.8% 3,251	44.0% 2,875
2020	48.4% 3,426	50.0% 3,541
2016	51.0% 3,126	45.7% 2,796
2012	47.3% 2,669	51.1% 2,883
2008	52.9% 3,218	45.5% 2,772
2004	53.2% 3,066	45.6% 2,629

In the 2013 gubernatorial election, Republican Chris Christie received 62.7% of the vote (2,191 cast), ahead of Democrat Barbara Buono with 36.4% (1,272 votes), and other candidates with 0.9% (32 votes), among the 3,571 ballots cast by the borough's 7,346 registered voters (76 ballots were spoiled), for a turnout of 48.6%. In the 2009 gubernatorial election, Republican Chris Christie received 2,037 votes (51.7% vs. 45.8% countywide), ahead of Democrat Jon Corzine with 1,663 votes (42.2% vs. 48.0%), Independent Chris Daggett with 181 votes (4.6% vs. 4.7%) and other candidates with 24 votes (0.6% vs. 0.5%), among the 3,937 ballots cast by the borough's 7,449 registered voters, yielding a 52.9% turnout (vs. 50.0% in the county).

United States Senate election results for Hasbrouck Heights1
Year	Republican		Democratic		Third party(ies)	
Year	No.	%	No.	%	No.	%
2024	3,154	51.56%	2,804	45.84%	159	2.60%
2018	2,309	51.38%	2,050	45.62%	135	3.00%
2012	2,348	45.79%	2,700	52.65%	80	1.56%
2006	2,080	52.82%	1,792	45.51%	66	1.68%

United States Senate election results for Hasbrouck Heights2
Year	Republican		Democratic		Third party(ies)	
Year	No.	%	No.	%	No.	%
2020	3,250	47.46%	3,486	50.91%	112	1.64%
2014	1,470	50.39%	1,397	47.89%	50	1.71%
2013	1,032	53.06%	896	46.07%	17	0.87%
2008	2,735	50.23%	2,622	48.15%	88	1.62%

== Education ==
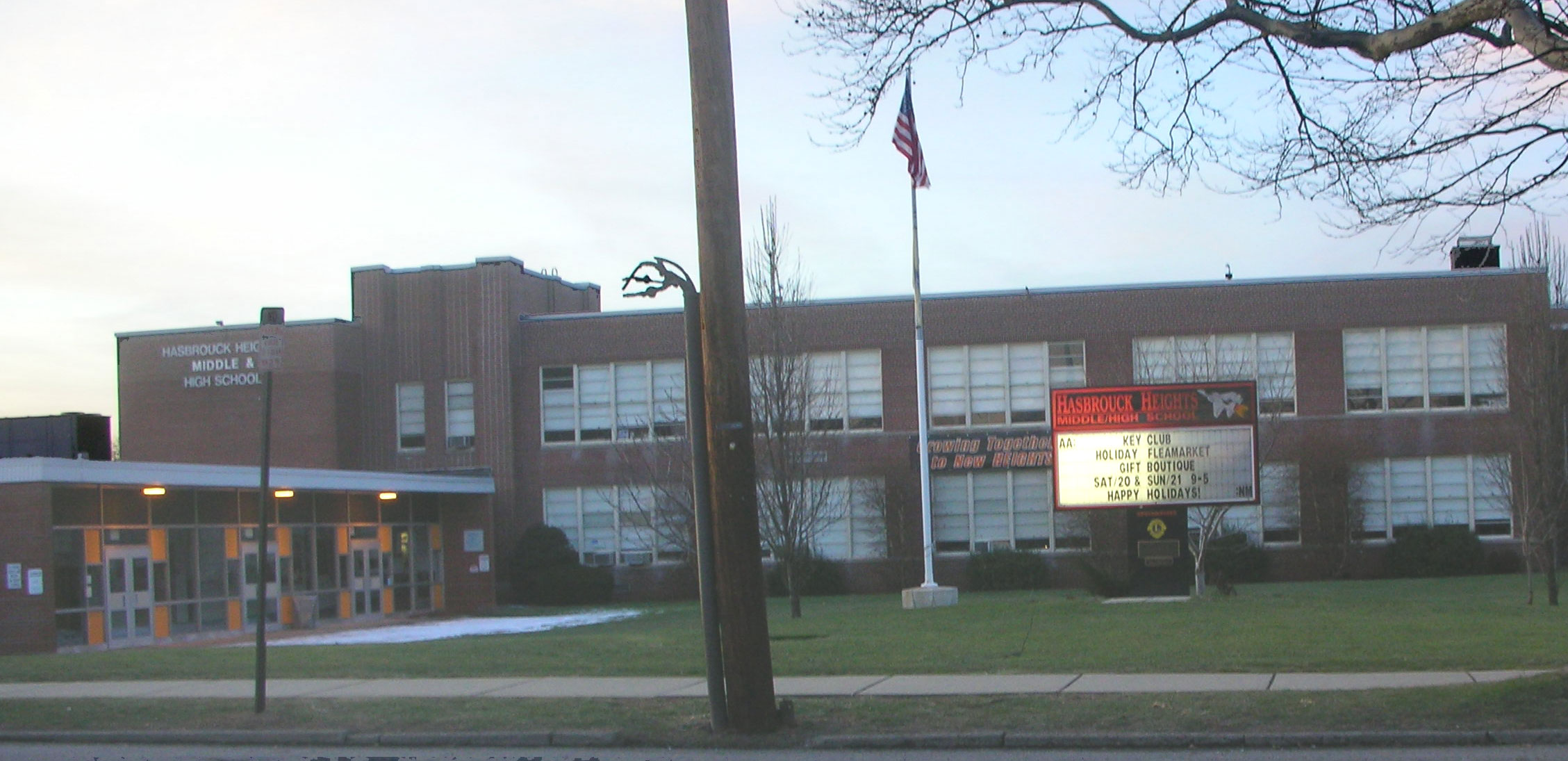
Hasbrouck Heights High School

The Hasbrouck Heights School District serves public school students in pre-kindergarten through twelfth grade. The district also serves students from Teterboro, a non-operating district that was merged into the Hasbrouck Heights School District following its dissolution on July 1, 2010. As of the 2020–21 school year, the district, comprised of four schools, had an enrollment of 1,745 students and 145.0 classroom teachers (on an FTE basis), for a student–teacher ratio of 12.0:1. Schools in the district (with 2020–21 enrollment data from the National Center for Education Statistics) are Euclid Elementary School with 338 students in grades Pre-K–5, Lincoln Elementary School with 386 students in grades Pre-K–5, Hasbrouck Heights Middle School with 426 students in grades 6–8 and Hasbrouck Heights High School with 558 students in grades 9–12.

Public school students from the borough, and all of Bergen County, are eligible to attend the secondary education programs offered by the Bergen County Technical Schools, which include the Bergen County Academies in Hackensack, and the Bergen Tech campus in Teterboro or Paramus. The district offers programs on a shared-time or full-time basis, with admission based on a selective application process and tuition covered by the student's home school district.

Corpus Christi School is a Catholic elementary school that serves children in preschool through eighth grade. The school belongs to the Corpus Christi Parish, and has two main buildings: the early childhood learning center, for ages three to five, and the main building for ages five to thirteen. The school operates under the supervision of the Roman Catholic Archdiocese of Newark.

== Transportation ==
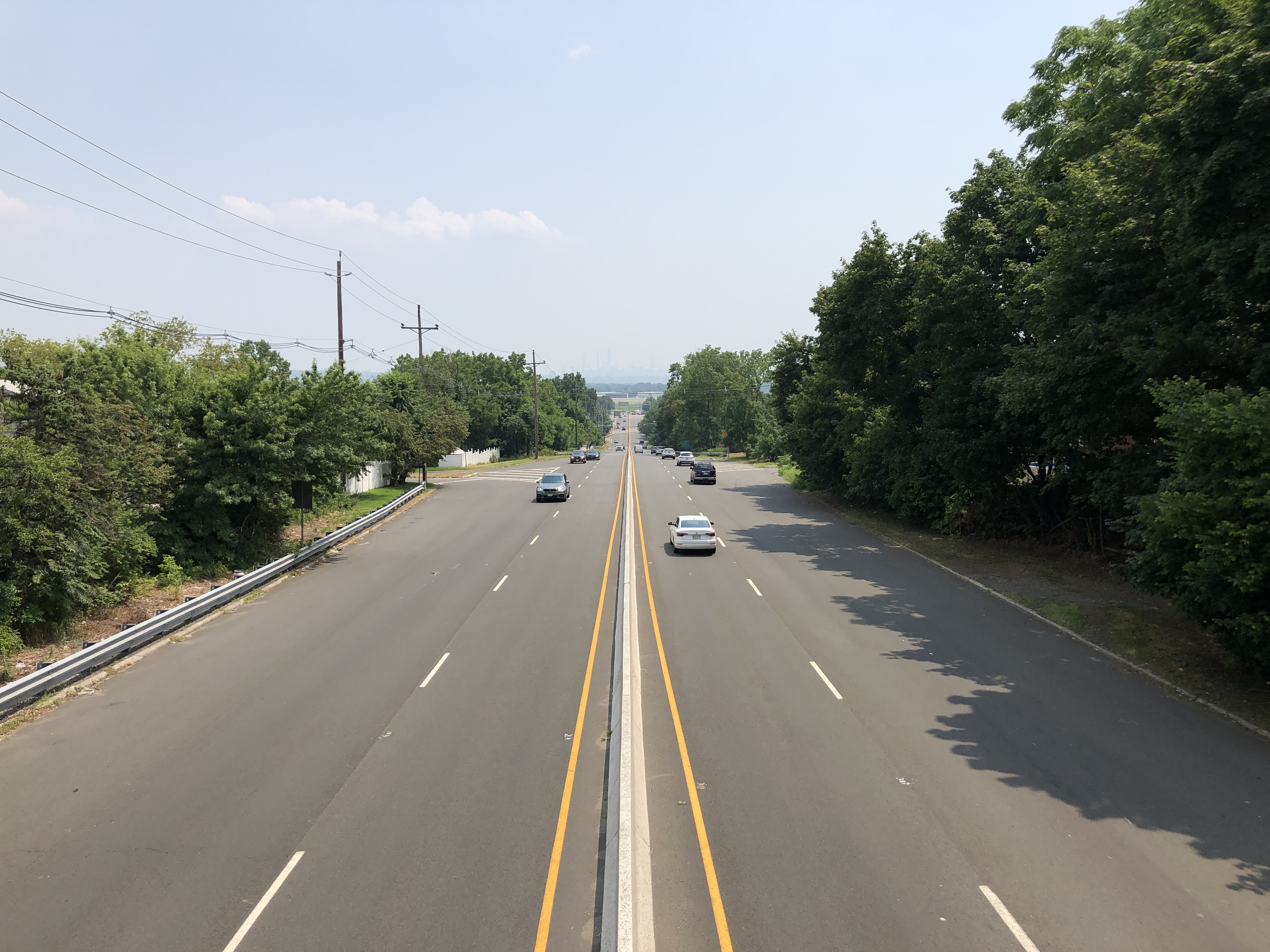
View east along U.S. Route 46 in Hasbrouck Heights

=== Roads and highways ===
As of May 2010, the borough had a total of 36.64 miles (58.97 km) of roadways, of which 29.29 miles (47.14 km) were maintained by the municipality, 4.78 miles (7.69 km) by Bergen County and 2.57 miles (4.14 km) by the New Jersey Department of Transportation.

Route 17 and U.S. Route 46 pass through Hasbrouck Heights.

=== Public transportation ===
NJ Transit bus routes 161, 163 and 164 provide service to and from the Port Authority Bus Terminal in Midtown Manhattan; the 76 line serves Newark and Hackensack; and local service is offered on the 709 and 780 routes.

NJ Transit provides rail service via the Pascack Valley Line's Teterboro station, which is located on the eastern boundary with Teterboro, just across the tracks from the Williams Avenue dead end in Hasbrouck Heights. The station is four stops from the line's northern terminus at Hoboken Terminal. Although the rail line's tracks lie entirely within the borders of Hasbrouck Heights, and in fact form the borough's eastern boundary with Teterboro, New Jersey Transit considers the station to be in Teterboro because passenger boarding, passenger shelter, parking lot, and ingress/egress roads are accessed from that municipality.

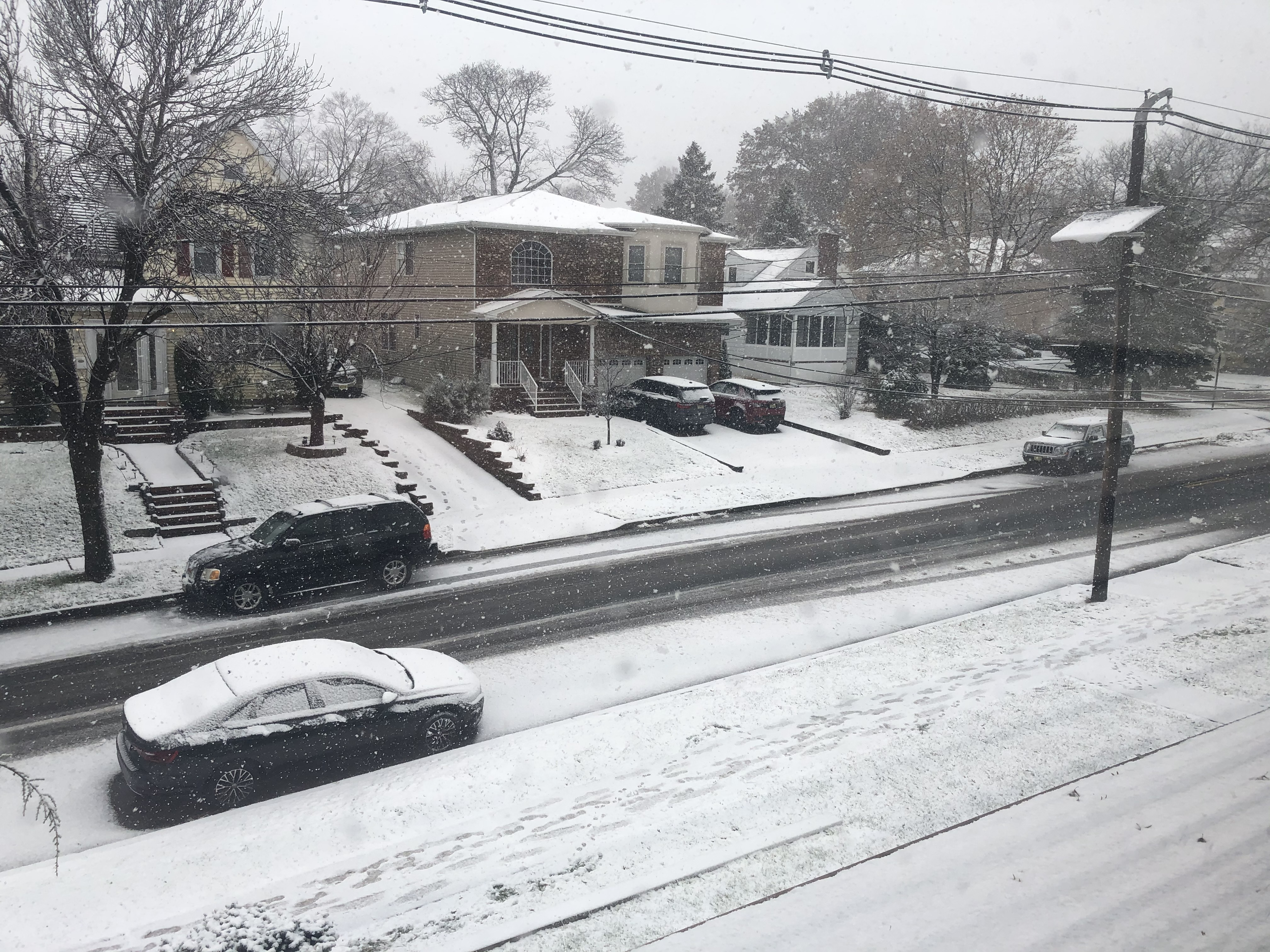
Kipp Avenue in Hasbrouck Heights, NJ on a snowy, winter day

In January 2013, New Jersey Transit erected a 300-foot (91 m) chain link fence in the vicinity of the Williams Avenue dead end as a safety measure to prevent pedestrians / commuters from crossing over the tracks illegally to gain access to the trains on the Teterboro side. Hasbrouck Heights Mayor Rose Marie Heck, Assemblyman Tim Eustace, and Hasbrouck Heights commuters have tried to work with New Jersey Transit to find alternative solutions, including installation of a pedestrian rail crossing with swing gates and warning lights. New Jersey Transit has indicated there are no immediate alternatives available since funding is not available.

Teterboro Airport is located on the borough's eastern border with Hasbrouck Heights.

== Notable events ==
- 1664 – Settled.
- 1894 – Incorporated.
- 1896 – Volunteer fire department established.
- 1935 – (May 19) Small biplane loses altitude after taking off from Teterboro Airport, and drops directly in front of automobile on Route 2 (now Route 17). Driver of automobile only bruised after crash, pilot and student co-pilot severely injured.
- 1966 – (June 29) Pilot James P. Scott crash-lands his Piper Aztec twin-engine plane on front lawn of Burton Avenue home after losing an engine and skimming the top of a tree, which softened his landing. The plane slid up the driveway and struck the house. The residents were not at home, and the pilot survived.
- 1999 – (December 9) A Beechcraft Baron bound from Virginia for neighboring Teterboro Airport crashed in a backyard. All four people passengers aboard the plane died, no injuries occurred on the ground.
- 1999 – (December 10) The Municipal Building (housing the borough hall, borough court, fire department, police department) catches fire. The cause of the blaze was found to be an electrical problem. A new building was constructed on the Boulevard and Central and dedicated on December 14, 2003.
- 2006 – (June) The public library director Michele Reutty was in the news for not providing information to the borough police when they turned up at the library without a subpoena. This event drew widespread attention via a Slashdot article.
- 2025 – (August 2) The town was at the epicenter of a 3.0 magnitude earthquake, strong enough to be felt across Northern New Jersey and New York City.

== Notable people ==
People who were born in, residents of, or otherwise closely associated with Hasbrouck Heights include:

- Bruce Aitken, radio host and author.
- Jason Biggs (born 1978), actor best known for his role in the American Pie film series, attended Hasbrouck Heights High School
- Robert Burns (1926–2016), politician who served two terms in the New Jersey General Assembly from the 38th Legislative District
- Marian Calabro, author and publisher of history books
- Clarence Chamberlin (1893–1976), aviation pioneer who was the second man to pilot a fixed-wing aircraft across the Atlantic Ocean, from New York to the European mainland, while carrying the first transatlantic passenger
- Clams Casino (born 1987 as Mike Volpe), hip hop producer
- Vincent J. Dellay (1907–1999), represented New Jersey for one term in the United States House of Representatives
- Peter Dykstra (1957–2024), Greenpeace activist and a CNN environment correspondent
- Arthur Godfrey (1903–1983), entertainer
- Kathy Godfrey (c. 1915–1981), talk show host on radio and television
- Rose Marie Heck (1932-2026), former mayor of Hasbrouck Heights who also served in the New Jersey General Assembly
- Victoria Hutson Huntley (1900–1971), artist and printmaker
- Willie Moretti (1894–1951), Mafia gangster who testified before the Anti-Crime Investigation Committee (Kefauver Committee) and was shot dead in a Cliffside Park restaurant
- Tony Orlando (born 1944), show business professional, best known as the lead singer of the 1970s group Tony Orlando and Dawn
- Bill Parcells (born 1941), former Executive Vice President of Football Operations for the Miami Dolphins and former head coach of the New York Giants, New England Patriots, New York Jets and Dallas Cowboys
- Luis Alvarez Roure (born 1976), Puerto Rican portrait painter
- Oscar Schwidetzky (1875–1963), philanthropist, inventor of the Ace bandage and the disposable syringe
- Jay Seals (born 1976), actor who has appeared on television in Mad Men and Awake
- Frank Sinatra (1915–1998), singer and actor
- Scott Slutzker (born 1972), former NFL tight end for the Indianapolis Colts, New Orleans Saints, and New York Jets
- Edgar Smith (1934–2017), convicted murderer, who was once on death row for the 1957 murder of 15-year-old honor student and cheerleader Victoria Ann Zielinski

== Popular culture ==
The song "Hasbrook Heights" (note the different spelling to the name of the borough) was composed and recorded by Burt Bacharach in 1971. Hal David wrote the lyrics. The song's best-known version can be found on Dionne Warwick's 1972 album Dionne.
