= Sybil Moses =

American judge (1939–2009)

Sybil Rappaport Moses (June 28, 1939 – January 23, 2009) was an American lawyer and judge. She was the prosecutor for the "Dr. X" murder trial of Mario Jascalevich, only four years after she graduated from law school. Moses later was a judge of the New Jersey Superior Court.

== Early life and education ==
Born in Newark, New Jersey as Sybil Rappaport, she was raised in Irvington, New Jersey. She earned her undergraduate degree in history from the University of Maryland, College Park and a masters in international relations at the University of Pennsylvania. She was awarded a law degree from Rutgers School of Law - Newark, graduating with honors in 1974.

== Prosecutor ==
After completing law school, she joined the Bergen County, New Jersey, prosecutor's office, where she handled some 50 cases as an assistant prosecutor. Her most notable case was the 1978 "Dr. X" murder trial of Mario Jascalevich, which she took on only four years after completing law school. The case dated back to series of suspicious deaths of surgical patients at Riverdell Hospital in Oradell, New Jersey in the mid-1960s. An initial investigation did not turn up any conclusive evidence of wrongdoing and the case lay dormant for a decade. In 1976, M. A. Farber of The New York Times wrote a six-month-long series of investigative articles which blamed a "Dr. X" for a series of murders at the hospital using curare, a powerful muscle relaxant. The prosecutor's office reopened the case and an indictment was issued against Jascalevich, charging him with responsibility for five of the deaths after curare was found in bodies of patients that had been exhumed. The contentious case went to trial in February 1978, with Moses arguing that Jascalevich had played God, trying to make his colleagues look incompetent. Defense Attorney Raymond A. Brown argued that Jascalevich was framed by incompetent colleagues and explained that the curare was used in canine experiments. Brown subpoenaed reporter Farber's notes, and Farber was jailed for 40 days for refusing to turn over the documents Brown had requested. The trial lasted eight months, then the longest criminal trial in New Jersey history; Jascalevich was acquitted of all charges.

== Judge ==
After five years with the prosecutor's office, Moses was named to serve as a state administrative law judge. She was appointed as a judge on New Jersey Superior Court in 1987. She was later named the Presiding Judge of the Criminal Part. She was named as the court's assignment judge in 1997, the first woman in New jersey ever appointed to that post, having been chosen by Chief Justice Deborah Poritz of the New Jersey Supreme Court, the first woman to fill that post.

Moses issued an August 2003 ruling requiring the Port Authority of New York and New Jersey to release transcripts of radio communications between its staff that took place during the September 11 attacks. The release of the information had been part of an agreement between the Port Authority and The New York Times, but the agency had backed out of the deal days later in response to privacy concerns of the victim's families. An attorney from the newspaper hailed Moses's decision and stated that the "transcripts will help to better understand how emergency operations were handled" within the World Trade Center complex.

== Death ==
Moses died of breast cancer at age 69 at her Englewood, New Jersey, home on January 23, 2009. She was survived by her husband, Stephen, as well as by a daughter, a son, and five grandchildren. Her husband died soon thereafter.

== See also ==
- List of first women lawyers and judges in New Jersey
