= Valentino Mazzia =

American physician

Valentino D. B. Mazzia (February 17, 1922 – March 10, 1999) was an American physician who served as chairman of the department of anesthesiology at the New York University School of Medicine and was a pioneer in the forensic analysis of deaths occurring during surgical procedures. He testified in many criminal cases about the use and presence of anesthesia products in cases of death.

Mazzia was born on February 17, 1922, in New York City and graduated from City College of New York in 1943. He attended New York University School of Medicine earning his Doctor of Medicine degree in 1950. He was on the faculty of Cornell University Medical School in the 1950s as chaired the anesthesiology department at New York University starting in the 1960s.

Starting in 1961, he worked at the New York City Medical Examiner's Office under Drs. Michael Baden and Milton Helpern. Baden credited Mazzia with going on to "create the specialty of forensic anesthesiology" describing how Mazzia would go "to the scene, which was the operating room, to see if something went wrong", closing off the room for investigation and basing his judgments on his findings on the spot. He left the medical examiner's office in the early 1970s. He then spent two years as director of anesthesiology at Los Angeles County-Martin Luther King Jr. General Hospital and practiced medicine in California and Nevada.

Adding legal education to his medical training, Mazzia earned a degree in law from University of Southern California and in 1978 was awarded a Juris Doctor degree from the University of Denver School of Law. Thereafter he worked extensively in medical malpractice cases. He also served over the years as a consultant in a number of murder cases related to anesthesia, including the 1978 "Dr. X" murder trial of Mario Jascalevich, who was charged with killing surgical patients at Riverdell Hospital with curare, a powerful muscle relaxant. Earlier, Dr. Helpern had brought Mazzia in to testify in the murder trial of Dr. Carl A. Coppolino, who was accused of using succinylcholine chloride to kill his victims.

A resident of Manhattan, Mazzia died due to cirrhosis of the liver at age 77 on March 10, 1999, at Mount Sinai Hospital. Dr. Baden indicated that the cirrhosis resulted from a case of Hepatitis C that he had contracted while working as an anesthesiologist. He was survived by his wife, as well as three children from a previous marriage.
