= Morris Pashman =

American judge (1912–1999)

Associate Justice of the New Jersey Supreme Court
- In office April 1973 – 1982
- Appointed by: William T. Cahill
- Preceded by: Haydn Proctor
- Succeeded by: Marie L. Garibaldi

Mayor of Passaic, New Jersey
- In office 1952–1955

Personal details
- Born: September 27, 1912 Passaic, New Jersey, U.S.
- Died: October 3, 1999 (aged 87) New York City, New York, U.S.
- Party: Republican
- Education: Rutgers Law School

Morris Pashman (September 27, 1912 – October 3, 1999) was a justice of the New Jersey Supreme Court, and before that a judge on New Jersey Superior Court and Mayor of Passaic, New Jersey. On the New Jersey Supreme Court, Pashman issued opinions in two major murder cases, advocated for the equal citizenship rights of the mentally handicapped and was one of the few dissenting votes objecting to the jailing of a reporter who refused to turn over his notes in a murder case.

== Early life and career ==
Pashman was born in Passaic on September 27, 1912, and attended Passaic High School, before moving on to New York University and the University of Michigan. He graduated from Rutgers School of Law—Newark in 1936.

After spending time in private practice, Pashman was named in 1946 to serve in Passaic on its police court, and later on its municipal court. Elected Mayor of Passaic in 1951, he served until 1955 and then served as city commissioner and director of revenue and finance.

== Superior Court ==
After two years on Passaic County Court, Governor of New Jersey Robert B. Meyner appointed him to New Jersey Superior Court in 1961. He became the assignment judge for Passaic County in 1965 and for Bergen County in 1966.

In a 1964 decision, Pashman upheld Bergen County prosecutor Guy W. Calissi's decision to ban the sale of the John Cleland book Fanny Hill in New Jersey, calling the book "sufficiently obscene to forfeit the protection of the First Amendment of the Constitution." In addition to failing tests of "social value," "prurient interest" and "patently offensive," Pashman ruled that Fanny Hill failed the "hard-core pornography test," noting that the "book may be well-written but still obscene." The decision was overturned, and Pashman would later call his actions in the case an "aberration," saying that "I think every judge or justice is entitled to one."

In a 1966 ruling in a case filed by the Passaic County Bar Association, Pashman's decision stated that the Passaic County Board of Chosen Freeholders was obligated to replace the county courthouse due to inadequate conditions in the building. A new building was constructed within four years of the order.

In 1971 Judge Pashman agreed to a plea bargain that allowed Edgar Smith to go free with a time-served sentence. Smith had been convicted of the 1957 murder of a 15-year-old cheerleader and was sentenced to death. However, in 1971 a federal judge vacated the conviction and sentence, holding that Smith's post-arrest statement/confession had been coerced and had to be excluded at retrial. The State prosecutor was concerned that without that critical evidence the case was significantly weakened and agreed to allow Smith to plead guilty to second-degree murder with time served (14 years).

== New Jersey Supreme Court ==
Governor William T. Cahill named Pashman to serve as a justice of the New Jersey Supreme Court in April 1973 to replace Justice Haydn Proctor.

In the 1978 "Dr. X" murder trial of Mario Jascalevich, Judge Theodore Trautwein had ordered that reporter M. A. Farber of The New York Times be sent to jail for refusing to turn over notes to the defense attorney. When Farber was about to be jailed, his attorneys filed for an emergency stay on a weekend and Pashman arrived in his golfing attire to grant the stay. When the full court heard the case the next day, Pashman was the only dissenter as the court upheld the lower court ruling and ordered that Farber serve time in jail. When the court reaffirmed the lower court action in a decision in September 1978, Pashman and fellow Justice Alan B. Handler were the only dissenters.

In another 1978 case, this on challenging New Jersey's Blue Laws, the court ruled 5–2 to uphold the laws then in effect in 10 of the state's 21 counties restricting sales of certain products on Sundays. Handler and Pashman were the only dissenters, with Pashman saying that the law fails the too-frequently ignored "test of common sense" and that it improperly grants government the right to tell people what to do "for their own good."

Pashman reached the mandatory retirement age of 70 in 1982.

== Death ==
A resident of Clifton, New Jersey who continued his work in the legal profession until days before his death, Pashman died at Columbia-Presbyterian Medical Center at age 87 on October 3, 1999. He was survived by a daughter, a son, four grandsons, and three great-grandchildren.

== See also ==
- List of Jewish American jurists
