= List of first women lawyers and judges in New Jersey =

This is a list of the first women lawyer(s) and judge(s) in New Jersey. It includes the year in which the women were admitted to practice law (in parentheses). Also included are women who achieved other distinctions such becoming the first in their state to graduate from law school or become a political figure.

== Firsts in New Jersey's history ==
=== Lawyers ===
- First female: Mary Philbrook (1895)
- First female to independently defend a client on a homicide charge: Elizabeth Blume Silverstein (1913)
- First African American females: M. Bernadine Johnson Marshall and Martha Belle (1949)
- First Puerto Rican female: Gloria Soto
- First undocumented female: Marisol Conde-Hernández (2018)

=== State judges ===
- First female (justice of the peace): Martha Kemble in 1920
- First female judge: Libby E. Bernstein Sachar (1925) in 1946
- First female judge (Juvenile and Domestic Relations Court) Aldona E. Appleton in 1958
- First female (New Jersey Supreme Court): Marie L. Garibaldi in 1982
- First African American female: Shirley Tolentino (1971) in 1984
- First female (Chief Justice; New Jersey Supreme Court): Deborah Poritz (1977) in 1996
- First female (Superior Court; Assignment Judge): Sybil Moses (1974) in 1997
- First female (Superior Court; Assignment Judge for Union County): Lisa Miralles Walsh in 2021 (https://njhba.org/page-647227/13293869)
- First Haitian American (female) [municipal court]: Sybil M. Elias in 2003
- First Latino American female (magistrate): Esther Salas (1981) in 2006
- First Filipino American (female) [superior court]: Carlia Magpantay Brady in 2012
- First African American female (Superior Court; Assignment Judge): Lisa Thornton (1992) in 2014
- First African American female (New Jersey Supreme Court): Fabiana Pierre-Louis in 2020
- First South Asian (female) (municipal court): Dipti Vaid Dedhia in 2022
- First hijab-wearing: Nadia Kahf in 2023
- First Muslim female (administrative law judge): Lubna Qazi-Chowdhry in 2026

=== Federal judges ===
- First (African American) female (U.S. District Court for the District of New Jersey): Anne Elise Thompson (1964) in 1979
- First Hispanic American woman (U.S. District Court for the District of New Jersey; U.S. Magistrate Judge for the District of New Jersey): Esther Salas (1981) in 2006
- First South Asian American female and first Muslim female (U.S. Magistrate Judge for the District of New Jersey): Rukhsanah L. Singh in 2022

=== Attorney General of New Jersey ===
- First female: Deborah Poritz (1977) from 1994-1996
- First Hispanic American (female): Zulima Farber in 2006
- First African American female: Paula Dow in 2010

=== Deputy Attorney General ===
- First female: June Strelecki in 1957

=== Assistant Attorney General ===
- First female: Marilyn H. Loftus (1961)

=== United States Attorney ===
- First female: Faith S. Hochberg from 1994-1999

=== Assistant United States Attorneys ===
- First (African American) females: Barbara Ann Morris and Carolyn Elizabeth Arch respectively in 1956 and 1966

=== Public Advocate ===
- First female: Zulima Farber from 1992-1994

=== County Prosecutors ===
- First (African American) female: Anne Elise Thompson (1964) in 1975
- First Hispanic American (female): Camelia M. Valdes (2001) in 2009
- First Asian American (female): Grace H. Park in 2013

=== Political Office ===
- First Latino American female (Acting Governor of New Jersey): Zulima Farber in 2006

=== Bar Associations ===
- First female president (New Jersey State Bar Association): Marie L. Garibaldi
- First African American (female) president (New Jersey State Bar Association): Karol Corbin Walker in 2003
- First Latino American female president (New Jersey State Bar Association): Evelyn Padin in 2018
- First African American (female) president (Federal Bar of New Jersey): Karol Corbin Walker in 2015

== Firsts in local history ==
- Mary Freed: First female magistrate in Atlantic City, New Jersey (1922) [Atlantic County, New Jersey]. Freed was elected to the Magistrates' Court In November 1921.
- Patricia M. Thompson (1964): Reputed to be the first African American female lawyer in Bergen County, New Jersey
- Sybil Moses (1974): First female judge in Bergen County, New Jersey
- Lois Ely: First female to serve as the Assistant County Prosecutor for Bergen County, New Jersey
- Julie Kim: First Asian American (female) judge in Bergen County, New Jersey
- Lillian Baker (née Dubrow) (1946): First female lawyer in Burlington County, New Jersey
- Ann Schmerling Salsberg (1928): First female lawyer in Camden County, New Jersey
- Mary Ellen Talbott (1963): First female judge in Camden County, New Jersey (1973)
- Judith S. Charny (c. 1984): First female municipal judge in Cherry Hill, New Jersey (Camden County, New Jersey; 2014)
- Kimberly Mutcherson: First African American and openly LGBT female to serve as the Dean for Rutgers Law School (2015)
- Demetrica Todd-Ruiz: First female (and African American female) judge in Vineland, New Jersey [Cumberland County, New Jersey]
- Jennifer Webb-McRae: First African American (female) Prosecutor of Cumberland County, New Jersey (2010)
- Elizabeth Blume Silverstein (1913): First female lawyer in Essex County, New Jersey
- Patricia A. Hurt: First African American female to serve as the Essex County Prosecutor (1997)
- Julie Garcia: First female District Attorney for Essex County, New Jersey (2006-2009)
- Golden E. Johnson (1971): First African American female judge in Newark, New Jersey (Essex County, New Jersey; 1974)
- Myrna Milan: First Hispanic American female judge in Newark, New Jersey [Essex County, New Jersey]
- Joanne Cocchiola: First female municipal court judge in Nutley, New Jersey (2012) [Essex County, New Jersey]
- Lilia L. Munoz: First Hispanic American female (and Hispanic American in general) to serve as the President of the Hudson County Bar Association, New Jersey. She is also the first Hispanic female to serve as the Chief Municipal Court Judge in Union City, New Jersey.
- Anne Elise Thompson (1964): First (African American) female to serve as the Mercer County Prosecutor (1975)
- Carmen M. Garcia: First Hispanic American female to be appointed to the Trenton Municipal Court (1988) and first Hispanic American female Chief Judge of Trenton Municipal Court (2001).
- Esther Beckhoff (1924): First female lawyer in Middlesex County, New Jersey
- Aldona E. Appleton: First female to serve as the President of the Middlesex County Bar Association (1961)
- Renee Anthony: First African American (female) to serve as the President of the Middlesex County Bar Association
- Yolanda Ciccone: First female to serve as the Middlesex County Prosecutor (2020)
- Arlene Quinones-Perez: First female (and Latino American female) to become the City Attorney for Perth Amboy [Middlesex County, New Jersey]
- Florence Forgotson (1927): First female lawyer in Monmouth County, New Jersey
- Lori Linskey: First female to serve as the First Assistant Prosecutor for Monmouth County, New Jersey (2017)
- Lisa Miralles Walsh: First Hispanic American female assignment judge in Monmouth County, New Jersey
- Lourdes Lucas: First Hispanic American (female) judge appointed in the Monmouth Vicinage
- Lisa Thornton: First African American (female) judge in Neptune, Monmouth County, New Jersey (1999)
- Rose Danna Ruesch (1935): First female lawyer in Morris County, New Jersey
- Katherine Hayden: First female President of the Morris County Bar Association, New Jersey
- Marianne Espinosa: First Hispanic American female to serve as a Judge of the Morris-Sussex vicinage
- Dorothy Reeve: First female lawyer in Ocean County, New Jersey
- Sadie Pasternack Ranzenhofer (1914): First female lawyer in Passaic County, New Jersey
- LaToyia Jenkins Stewart (2000): First African American female judge in Passaic County, New Jersey
- Linda H. Samson: First female to serve as the President of the Passaic County Bar Association
- Camelia M. Valdes (2001): First Latino American female to serve as the County Prosecutor for Passaic County, New Jersey(2009)
- Sandra Lopez: First Hispanic American female judge in Salem County, New Jersey
- Mary E. Alward (1898): First female lawyer in Union County, New Jersey
- Grace H. Park: First Asian American (and female) to serve as the County Prosecutor of Union County, New Jersey (2013)
- Juliana Diaz: First Latino American (female) to serve as a municipal court judge for Elizabeth, Union County, New Jersey (2020)
- Kelly A. Waters: First female Public Defender for Mountainside and Fanwood. She later became a municipal court judge in the Union Township (2007). [Union County, New Jersey]

== See also ==
- List of first women lawyers and judges in the United States
- Timeline of women lawyers in the United States
- Women in law

== Other topics of interest ==
- List of first minority male lawyers and judges in the United States
- List of first minority male lawyers and judges in New Jersey
