= Raymond A. Brown =

American criminal defense lawyer

Raymond A. Brown (1915 – October 9, 2009) was an American criminal defense lawyer who represented a wide variety of high-profile clients, ranging from politicians to accused spies, including New Jersey state senator Angelo Errichetti (convicted in the Abscam case), boxer Rubin "Hurricane" Carter and "Dr. X" physician Mario Jascalevich.

== Early life and education ==
Brown was born in Fernandina Beach, Florida and moved as a child to Jersey City, New Jersey. He attended the historically black college Florida Agricultural and Mechanical University and earned his law degree at Fordham University School of Law, while working as a longshoreman to cover the costs of tuition. He went into solo practice during a time when few large firms would hire African American attorneys. While serving in the United States Army, he saw how poorly African American soldiers were treated.

== Legal career ==
During the 1960s, he worked on defending African Americans arrested during the Civil Rights Movement. In a 1964 case, Brown represented electrical engineer John W. Butenko, who was charged with passing defense secrets to the Soviet Union and was sentenced to 30 years in federal prison. He defended students who had been arrested for taking part in building takeovers during the Columbia University protests of 1968, including his own son.

He was able to get an acquittal for LeRoi Jones (now known as Amiri Baraka), who had been arrested for carrying a concealed weapon during the 1967 Newark riots. Brown worked with National Guard troops during the 1967 riots to help quell the violence and was later appointed by Governor of New Jersey Richard J. Hughes as vice chair of a commission that investigated the causes, response and possible solutions to the rioting.

He represented three members of the Black Panther Party who had been charged with a 1968 machine gunning of a police station in Jersey City, New Jersey. In the case, Brown would subpoena reporters from The New York Times who would testify about their reporting on the case. Brown would also represent H. Rap Brown, a leader of the Student Nonviolent Coordinating Committee and Black Panther Party.

Brown represented Black Liberation Army member Assata Shakur, who was convicted and sentenced to life imprisonment for her role in the 1973 shooting of a New Jersey State Police trooper on the New Jersey Turnpike. Chesimard (Shakur's married last name) later escaped from prison and has since been in exile in Cuba.

Brown represented boxer Rubin "Hurricane" Carter on charges that he and John Artis killed three people in 1966 in Paterson, New Jersey. Carter was convicted in his first trial, but the conviction was overturned in 1975. Brown participated as a witness in Carter's second trial, which again resulted in conviction that was also overturned, with Carter freed by a federal court in 1985 after spending almost two decades in prison.

In the late-1970s "Dr. X" case, Brown successfully defended Dr. Mario Jascalevich, who had been charged with the curare-related deaths of five patients at Riverdell Hospital in Oradell, New Jersey. Brown blamed other doctors at the hospital of framing Jascalevich to cover up their own ineptitude and charged that reporter M. A. Farber of The New York Times had conspired with prosecutors to advance their respective careers by pointing the finger of blame at Jascalevich. After Brown subpoenaed thousands of pages of the reporter's notes from The Times, Farber was held in jail for 40 days on contempt charges by Judge Theodore Trautwein and The Times was fined almost $300,000 for its efforts to protect its sources. In November 1978, the Supreme Court of the United States refused to take the case, citing the fact that neither the United States Constitution or existing state shield laws provide an absolute privilege to refuse to provide information demanded in a criminal case by a defendant. (For a similar case ruling in Washington state, see Theodore Rinaldo § Appeals.)

In the 1980s, Brown represented Camden, New Jersey mayor and State Senator Angelo Errichetti who was convicted for his role in the Abscam sting, in which U.S. law enforcement officials pretended to be representing wealthy Arab sheiks.

== Death ==
A resident of Upper Montclair, New Jersey, Brown died at age 94 on October 9, 2009, at Saint Barnabas Medical Center because of chronic obstructive pulmonary disease. He was survived by his second wife, the former Jennie Davis, as well as by two children from his first marriage, two stepchildren and seven grandchildren. His first marriage ended with the death of his wife, the former Elaine Camilla Williams.
