= Guy W. Calissi =

American judge (1909–1980)

Guy W. Calissi (November 28, 1909 – December 6, 1980), was an American Democratic Party politician, prosecutor, lawyer and judge, who served for seven years as Mayor of Wood-Ridge, New Jersey, 16 years as Bergen County, New Jersey prosecutor and was appointed in 1970 to serve as a judge on New Jersey Superior Court, a post he served in until his mandatory retirement at age 70 in the year before his death.

== Early life and education ==
Born in Manhattan, New York City, Calissi spent his early years in an orphanage in Kearny, New Jersey. Raised in Wood-Ridge, New Jersey, he attended the local public schools and graduated from Hasbrouck Heights High School, where he competed on multiple sports teams.

Offered a college scholarship, he chose to decline it so that he could earn a living and graduated in 1941 from John Marshall Law School.

== Career ==
He was elected as Mayor of Wood-Ridge, New Jersey in 1947 and served in that position until 1954, when Governor of New Jersey Robert B. Meyner named him as Bergen County prosecutor, the first Democrat in decades to serve in that position.

In a 1964 case that was later overturned, Calissi placed a ban on the sale of the John Cleland book Fanny Hill in New Jersey. New Jersey Superior Court judge Morris Pashman upheld the ban, calling the book "sufficiently obscene to forfeit the protection of the First Amendment of the Constitution." In addition to failing tests of "social value", "prurient interest" and "patently offensive", Pashman ruled that Fanny Hill failed the "hard-core pornography test", noting that the "book may be well-written but still obscene".

As prosecutor, Calissi obtained death sentences for convicted murderers Edgar Smith and Thomas Trantino. Smith was convicted in 1957 of the bludgeoning of 15-year-old honor student and high school cheerleader Victoria Ann Zielinski in Ramsey, New Jersey. Calissi called Vickie's murder the "most vicious, most brutal and the most sadistic I have ever seen". Convicted of first degree murder in the original case and sentenced to death, Smith argued successfully for a new trial on the basis that his confession had been coerced. At a second trial, in June 1971, Smith accepted a deal under which he would plead guilty to second degree murder and be released on parole. Convicted of attacking and stabbing another woman in 1976, Smith admitted killing Zielinski.

Thomas Trantino was convicted in 1964 for the murder of two Lodi, New Jersey police officers and sentenced to the electric chair, but his death sentence was commuted to life imprisonment following the decision by the Supreme Court of the United States in 1972 to invalidate then existing capital punishment laws. Trantino ultimately spent 38 years in the prison system, and was not released on parole until 2002, after he had become the longest-serving inmate in the New Jersey penal system.

In 1966, Calissi investigated the deaths of several patients at a hospital in Oradell, New Jersey. The case, later known as the "Dr. X" case, led to the murder trial, and ultimate acquittal, of Dr. Mario Jascalevich, who had been charged in the murder of patients after a series of articles in The New York Times by M. A. Farber returned the case to public attention.

Governor of New Jersey Brendan Byrne named Calissi to New Jersey Superior Court. Calissi served in the post until shortly before his death, when he reached the mandatory retirement age of 70.

== Death ==
Calissi died at age 71 on December 6, 1980, at his home in Glen Rock, New Jersey. He was survived by his wife, Ethel, as well as three daughters and two sons.
