= Pete Appleton =

American baseball player (1904–1974)

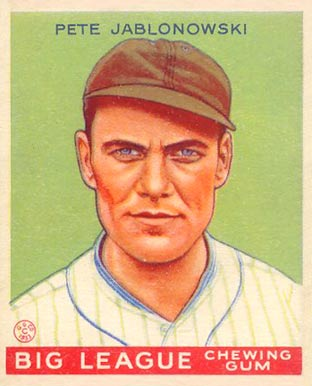
- 1933 Goudey card
- Pitcher
- Born: May 20, 1904; Terryville, Connecticut, U.S.
- Died: January 18, 1974 (aged 69); Trenton, New Jersey, U.S.
- Batted: Right Threw: Right

MLB debut
- September 14, 1927, for the Cincinnati Reds

Last MLB appearance
- September 20, 1945, for the Washington Senators

MLB statistics
- Win–loss record: 57–66
- Earned run average: 4.30
- Strikeouts: 420
- Stats at Baseball Reference

Teams
- Cincinnati Reds (1927–1928); Cleveland Indians (1930–1932); Boston Red Sox (1932); New York Yankees (1933); Washington Senators (1936–1939); Chicago White Sox (1940–1942); St. Louis Browns (1942, 1945); Washington Senators (1945)

Peter William Appleton (May 20, 1904 – January 18, 1974), born Peter Jablonowski and sometimes known as "Jabby" and the "Polish Wizard," was an American baseball player, scout, and manager.

Appleton played college baseball for the University of Michigan and played professional baseball from 1926 to 1951, including stints as a pitcher for the Cincinnati Reds, Cleveland Indians, Boston Red Sox, New York Yankees, Washington Senators, Chicago White Sox and St. Louis Browns. He compiled a record of 57–66 in 343 games in Major League Baseball.

He changed his surname from Jablonowski to Appleton in 1934. After retiring as a player, Appleton remained active in baseball as a scout and manager. He was a manager of minor league teams in the Washington Senators/Minnesota Twins organization for 20 years.

== Early years ==
Appleton was born as Peter Jablonowski in 1904 at Terryville, Connecticut. His father was a foreman at the Eagle Lock Co. in Terryville. Jablonowski attended Terryville High School where he was a star athlete in baseball, basketball, and track. He was selected as an all-state forward in basketball and broke the Connecticut state record with a distance of 39 feet, 4 inches in the shot put. In 1921, he threw a no-hitter and struck out 23 batters in a game against Waterbury High School.

As a youth, Jablonowski was an accomplished classical pianist. He reportedly "horrified his mother when he elected to become a baseball player." A newspaper profile of Jablonowski in 1930 noted: "He plays a mean piano. And no amount of persuasion will induce him to mix jazz with his Chopin and Beethoven. It remains to be seen how many more ball teams will fall for is 'slow music' on the diamond." A 1952 newspaper story noted that, during his time in the major leagues, he was "recognized as the finest piano player in the majors."

Jablonowski had three younger brothers, Joe, John, and Alec, who also played baseball. Joe played baseball at the University of New Hampshire. John played "twilight ball" in Terryville and struck out 16 batters in a game in 1929.

== University of Michigan ==
Jablonowski attended the University of Michigan. He was a pitcher for the Michigan Wolverines baseball team for three years from 1924 to 1926. He helped lead the 1924 Michigan team to a 16–7 overall record (8–2 in conference) and the Big Ten Conference championship. During a trip to the South in the early part of the season, Jablonowski was the starting pitcher in Michigan's first win of the 1924 season, a 10–1 victory over Alabama Polytechnical School (now known as Auburn University). In his second start on the road trip, Jablonowski won a 3–1 decision against Mississippi A&M College (now known as Mississippi State University). The 1925 Michiganensian noted: "Jablonowski showed excellent form on the mound." On May 31, 1924, he was the winning pitcher and struck out 11 batters in the game that secured the Big Ten championship for Michigan — a 9–0 shutout victory against Wisconsin. In the final game of the 1924 season, Jablonowski threw a complete-game shutout, allowing only five hits and striking out 13 batters in an 11–0 victory over Japan's championship team from Meiji University.

In 1925, Jablonowski helped lead the Michigan baseball team to a 17–8 record. In the Big Ten Conference opener on May 2, 1925, he threw a one-hitter against Illinois, but lost 1–0 after two throwing errors allowed the Illini to score a run. The 1926 Michiganensian described the one hit allowed by Jablonowski as a "scratch hit," and some opined that the game should have been called a no-hitter as the hit came on a bobbled ground ball that the Illinois scorer credited as a base hit.

As a senior in 1926, Jablonowski helped lead Michigan to another Big Ten Conference baseball championship. In the third game of the season, Jablonowski shut out Vanderbilt, and Michigan won, 7–0. Jablonowski was also a strong batter for Michigan, compiling a .342 batting average in 1926 – the third highest on the team behind William H. Puckelwartz (.441) and Bennie Oosterbaan (.364).

Although the University of Michigan yearbooks identified Jablonowski as a pitcher, Appleton's obituary in The Sporting News noted that he also played shortstop and was part of a Michigan infield that was known as the "jawbreaker infield", including Jablonowski, Oosterbaan and Puckelwartz. The three did play together on the 1926 Michigan baseball team, but Puckelwartz played centerfield, Oosterbaan right field, and Jablonowski was a pitcher.

While attending Michigan, Jablonowski lived at Fletcher Hall and was a member of the Polonia Literary Club.

== Professional baseball ==
=== Overview ===
Appleton played professional baseball for 26 years from 1926 to 1951. He played for six major league and 12 minor league teams. In 14 seasons of Major League Baseball, Appleton posted a 57–66 record with 420 strikeouts and a 4.30 ERA in 341 games (71 as a starter). In his obituary, The Sporting News described him as "a righthander with no outstanding talents."

=== Waterbury Brasscos ===
After graduating from Michigan in June 1926, Appleton turned down several offers to play Major League Baseball and opted to play during the 1926 season near his Connecticut home for the Waterbury Brasscos in the Eastern League. In a game against Bridgeport in August 1926, he allowed three hits in a 1–0 victory. One week later, on August 17, 1926, Jablonowski threw a no-hitter against Bridgeport. Jablonowsky faced 29 batters, and Bridgeport hit only four balls out of the infield.

=== Cincinnati Reds ===
On October 1, 1926, the Cincinnati Reds drafted Jablonowski from Waterbury in the Rule 5 draft. After appearing in 40 games for the Hartford Senators (Eastern League) during the 1927 season with an earned run average of 2.99, Appleton made his Major League debut with the Reds in September 1927. In the final game of the 1927 season, he threw a four-hit shutout against the Pittsburgh Pirates, one day after the Pirates had clinched the National League penant. Jablonowski remained with the Reds in 1928. Over the course of the 1927 and 1928 seasons, he appeared in a total of 37 games for the Reds with a record of 5–5. Jablonowski was also a strong batter early in his career; he compiled a .381 batting average in his two seasons with the Reds.

=== Columbus Senators ===
In December 1928, Jablonowski was assigned to the Columbus Senators in the American Association. During the 1929 season, he compiled an 18–12 record for the Senators.

=== Cleveland Indians ===
In September 1929, Jablonski was purchased by the Cleveland Indians. He remained with the Indians from 1930 to 1932. In one of his first games for Cleveland, Jablonowski held the St. Louis Browns to one run. After the game, a newspaper wrote that Jablonowski studied psychology as a hobby and used it as part of his pitching technique:

"'Psych one.' 'Psyche two.' 'Psych three.' 'Batter's out.' They're going to have to change the terminology of baseball when Peter William Jablonowski does the pitching. For when Peter can't strike 'em out, he's got his mind made up to psych 'em out, which after all may be just as good, if it wins ball games."

The same newspaper profile described Jablonowski as follows: "Jablonowski has thick, stubby fingers, a wide mouth, a heavy nose and an assured manner. He is 5 feet, 11 inches tall and weighs 180 pounds. Some man! And how he wears his vivid clothes!"

In two years with Cleveland, Jablonowski appeared in 72 games with 12 wins and 11 losses.

=== Red Sox, Yankees and Bears ===
On June 10, 1932, he was traded by the Indians to the Boston Red Sox for pitcher Jack Russell. He appeared in 11 games for the Red Sox in 1932, compiling an 0–3 record.

In late July 1932, the Red Sox traded Jablonowski to the Newark Bears, an International League team affiliated with the New York Yankees, in exchange for John V. Welch. Jablonowski appeared in 12 games for Newark in 1932 and compiled an 11–1 record with a 3.73 ERA.

In January 1933, Jablonowski signed to play with the New York Yankees. He joined the Yankees in March 1933, but he appeared in only one regular-season game for the team, pitching two scoreless innings. Jablonowski later recalled an encounter with Babe Ruth shortly after he had been called up by the Yankees. During a road trip, Ruth placed a call to the hotel switchboard and asked the operator to page "any Yankee player that's around down there." Jablonowski took the call, and Ruth told him, "Hey, keed, how about coming up and playing some cards with me?" According to Jablonowski, Ruth would be mobbed if he came down to the lobby and was lonesome.

In early June 1933, the Yankees gave Jablonowski an outright release, sending him back to the Newark Bears. At Newark, Jablonowski put together a second strong season, compiling a 13–7 record in 22 games with a 3.88 ERA.

=== Name change ===
In early 1934, Appleton legally changed his surname from "Jablonowski" to "Appleton." According to one account, he decided to change his name, because he felt his birth name was "too much of a tongue twister, especially if he decided to embark on a musical career." Appleton considered pursuing a career as a band leader. He later recalled, "I never got around to it, and I suppose I really have no regrets."

The New Bill James Historical Baseball Abstract offered two alternate rationales for the name change. One theory was that Jablonowski changed his name in order to change his luck. In their history of the Boston Red Sox, Jim Prime and Bill Nowlin noted that, at least for a time, the name change did appear to bring the hoped-for change in luck:

"With the exception of pitching two innings for the Yankees in 1933, he was out of the majors until he reappeared in 1936 with the Senators, having changed his name to Pete Appleton. That year, freshly named, he went 14–9 with a 3.54 ERA, but then returned to his former level of mediocrity ... Perhaps he should have changed his name a second time – to Feller."

A third theory advanced by James was that he had recently married lawyer Aldona Eugenie Leszczynski , who "just couldn't stomach the prospect of going through the rest of her life as Aldora Leszcynski Jablonowski."

=== International League ===
Appleton spent the 1934 season in the International League, playing for the Rochester Red Wings and Baltimore Orioles. In February 1935, Appleton was sold to the Montreal Royals. He had the best season of his career in Montreal, compiling a 23–9 record with a 3.17 ERA. Appleton also performed well as a batter with .354 batting average for the Royals.

=== Washington Senators ===
After a good showing in Montreal, Appleton was drafted by the Washington Senators in the October 1935 Rule 5 draft. Appleton won three games for the Senators in April 1936, the opening month of the 1936 season, including a two-hitter against the defending 1935 World Series champions the Detroit Tigers. He had his best Major League season in 1936 with a 14–9 record and 88 strikeouts in 201-2/3 innings pitched. His 3.53 ERA in 1936 was the third best in the American League. He spent four full seasons with the Senators, his longest stint with any team. He appeared in 156 games for Washington from 1936 to 1939, compiling a record of 34–43.

=== Chicago White Sox ===
On December 8, 1939, Appleton was traded by the Senators to the Chicago White Sox along with Taffy Wright in exchange for Gee Walker. Appleton appeared in 42 games as a relief pitcher for the White Sox from 1940 to 1942 while compiling a 4–3 record.

=== St. Louis Browns ===
In July 1942, Appleton was released by the White Sox and signed as a free agent by the St. Louis Browns. He appeared in 14 games as a relief pitcher for the 1942 Browns with a 2.96 ERA. By the end of the 1942 season, Appleton was 38 years old and the 10th oldest player in Major League Baseball.

=== Wartime service ===
On November 28, 1942, following the United States' entry into World War II, Appleton was commissioned as a lieutenant in the United States Navy. Appleton was initially assigned to duty in North Carolina where he played for a Navy Pre-Flight baseball team and entertained cadets with his talent as a pianist. In July 1943, he was assigned to the Quonset Naval Base at Quonset Point, Rhode Island. In August 1943, Appleton was appointed as the coach of the Quonset Flyers baseball team. He also pitched for the Flyers during his wartime service. Appleton was discharged from the Navy in July 1945.

=== Final Major League season ===
After completing his military service, Appleton returned to the St. Louis Browns halfway through the 1945 season. He compiled a 15.43 ERA in two games and was released by the Browns in August 1945. He signed as a free agent with the Senators at the end of August 1945. He concluded his major meague career appearing in six games for the Senators in 1945 with a 3.38 ERA. He appeared in his final major league game on September 20, 1945. At age 41, he was the eighth oldest player in the major leagues at the end of the 1945 season.

=== Return to the minors ===
On April 10, 1946, Appleton was released by the Washington Senators, but he continued to pitch in the minor leagues for another six years. He played for the Buffalo Bisons in the International League from 1946 to 1948. He was given an outright release by Buffalo "to allow him an opportunity to shop for a managerial job."

In July 1948, Appleton signed with the Sherman–Denison Twins in the Big State League. He played there in 1948 and 1949.

He next served as the player-manager of the Dallas Eagles in the Texas League during the 1949 season. In 1950, he took over as the player-manager of the Augusta Tigers in the Sally League.

Appleton concluded his playing career in 1951 as a player-manager for the Erie Sailors in the Middle Atlantic League. Appleton was 47 years old when he appeared in his final game as a professional baseball player in 1951.

== Managerial and scouting career ==
Appleton spent more than 20 years as a scout and manager in minor league baseball. He was a player-manager for the Sherman–Denison Twins in 1949, the Augusta Tigers in 1950, and the Erie Sailors in 1951. He also had stints as a manager for the Roanoke Rapids Jays (1952), Charlotte Hornets (1954, 1970), Atlanta Crackers (1964), and Wisconsin Rapids Twins (1965). He served as a scout and pitching instructor in the Washington Senators/Minnesota Twins organization from the mid-1950s until they assigned him to replace Jack McKeon at the helm of the Atlanta Crackers in June 1964.

== Later years ==
In January 1974, Appleton died at St. Francis Hospital in Trenton, New Jersey, at the age of 69. He was buried at St. Gertrude Cemetery in Colonia, New Jersey.
