= Edgar Smith (murderer) =

American murderer (1934–2017)

- Born: February 8, 1934; Hasbrouck Heights, New Jersey, U.S.
- Died: March 20, 2017 (aged 83); Vacaville, California, U.S.
- Criminal charges: Murder, kidnapping, attempted murder, attempt to rob
- Penalty: Life in prison

Details
- Imprisoned at: California Medical Facility, Vacaville, California

Edgar Herbert Smith Jr. (February 8, 1934 – March 20, 2017) was an American convicted murderer sentenced to death for the 1957 slaying of 15-year-old Victoria Ann Zielinski in Ramsey, New Jersey. On death row, Smith began corresponding with conservative commentator William F. Buckley Jr., and gradually persuaded Buckley that he was innocent. With the help of an elite legal team retained by Buckley, Smith litigated his conviction through multiple court hearings and wrote a book proclaiming his innocence. In 1971, a federal judge vacated Smith's conviction and ordered a retrial. Smith then took a plea deal to time-served, resulting in his 1971 release. Five years later, Smith abducted and tried to kill another woman in San Diego, California. The victim survived and testified against him in court. During that proceeding Smith admitted killing Zielinski in 1957. He was sentenced to life in prison, where he died in 2017 at age 83.

== Murder of Vickie Zielinski ==
Shortly after 8:30 pm on the evening of March 4, 1957, 15-year-old Victoria Ann Zielinski of Ramsey, New Jersey, disappeared while walking home from a friend's house. "Vickie" was an honor student and cheerleader at Ramsey High School. The following morning her parents, searching for their missing daughter, found one of her black penny loafers and a grey scarf near the entrance to a sand pit at the intersection of Fardale Avenue and Chapel Road not far from their house. Mrs. Zielinski called the police while Mr. Zielinski continued the search. Up the dirt road to the sand pit Mr. Zielinski observed Vickie's red gloves. He returned to the intersection and with Mrs. Zielinski waited for police. The police arrived promptly and Mahwah Police Department's Captain Ed Wickham and Mr. Zielinski entered the sand pit.

In 1957, Fardale Avenue ended at Chapel Road, and a dirt road continued about 200 feet into a sand pit. The two men found Vickie's body at the bottom of a bank in the sand pit where it was not visible from the road. Blunt force trauma had mangled the girl's face and skull. At trial the coroner testified that the cause of death was "total crushing of the skull with a decerebration, traumatic." Vickie's dungarees remained fastened but her sweater was pushed up and her brassiere pulled down, and there was a human bite mark on her right breast. A sizable blood-stained rock, consistent with the wounds, was recovered not far from her body, and her brains were scattered nearby. A careful search revealed a clump of Vickie's hair, with blood, and a hair pin near the entrance to the sandpit, and a baseball bat stained with blood in the woods nearby. Bergen County Prosecutor Guy W. Calissi describing the killing as the "most vicious, most brutal and the most sadistic I have ever seen."

On the night of the murder, 23-year-old Edgar Smith, who lived a short distance from the sand pit, was using a light-blue, 1950 Mercury sedan borrowed from his friend Joseph Gilroy. Gilroy kept baseball bats and gloves in the car. After the murder was reported, Gilroy noted blood stains in his car and contacted police. Smith was brought in for questioning. His statement was recorded and under oath.

Smith was 23-years-old, married, and had a child. He told police that he knew Victoria Zielinski and had given her rides home from Ramsey High School. He admitted picking her up in Gilroy's Mercury on the evening of March 4 at about 8:35 pm upon seeing her walking toward her home. He claimed that she flagged him down and asked him for a ride. Once in the car, Smith stated that after Vickie directed him to drive around the block, he decided to park in the sand pit. Smith said that at the sand pit Vickie began getting out of the car, saying that she was going to walk home and tell her father that he was "like the rest of the guys." Smith stated that he leaned over from the driver's seat and grabbed her arm to keep her in the car so he could drive her home. She pulled against him trying to get out, and pulled him out the passenger door. Outside the car she yelled at him and slapped him, and he recalled swinging at her with his right hand as hard as he could. After that Smith claimed he could not remember what happened, but thought there was "running" at some point before he got back in the car alone and drove home. Smith brought officers to locations where he had discarded his blood-stained shoes (in a trashcan outside an apartment building) and Vickie's pocketbook and school books (recovered a distance off the side of a road). Officers found Smith's bloodstained pants in a brushy area about 50 feet off a different road. He said he had washed his jacket. Smith claimed to be unable to remember killing Vickie, but conceded that, "I must have been the one who really did it."

== Trial ==
Prior to the trial the State arranged for Smith to have mental health examinations by three psychiatrists. The brutality of the murder and the possibility of a capital penalty, along with Smith's claim of temporary amnesia, warranted the examinations. It was known to the examiners that at age 14 Smith sexually assaulted a ten-year-old girl and received a term of five-years probation in Bergen County Juvenile Court. The psychiatrists each concluded that Smith (1) was a sociopath, perfectly sane but "prone to act on impulse with little regard for the rights of others and little respect for constituted authority," and (2) had fabricated a false claim of temporary amnesia in an attempt to avoid responsibility for murdering Vickie.

At Smith's trial for first degree murder in New Jersey State court, Myrna Zielinski, Vickie's younger sister, testified that because Vickie didn't want to walk home alone in the dark on the night of the murder, the sisters had agreed that at 8:30 pm Myrna would walk toward the house of Vickie's friend Barbara Nixon to meet Vickie so they could walk home together. Myrna testified that she walked all the way to the Nixon's without finding her sister. Both homes were on Wyckoff Avenue, a bit over a half mile apart. On the witness stand, Myrna identified items of Vickie's clothing from that night. Mr. and Mrs. Zelinski testified about searching for their daughter on the night she disappeared and the next morning. They recounted finding articles of her clothing, and finally her body, just after 9 a.m. on the morning of March 5, in the area of the sandpit. Barbara Nixon also testified, corroborating Myrna Zielinski's testimony concerning Vickie's attire on the night she was murdered. Nixon also identified the grey scarf as one she lent to Vickie just before the girl left the Nixon home to meet her sister Myrna. The Nixons testified that Vickie left at 8:30 pm to walk home.

Detectives testified about recovering the physical evidence, including Vickie's scattered clothing, her clump of hair, the bloody bat and her body. They also described how Smith had admitted being in the sandpit with her that night and striking her; how Smith directed them to where he had discarded her purse and school books as well as his bloody shoes; and how they also recovered his blood-stained pants. Smith's statement was introduced. They testified that at one point Smith sought to implicate his friend Don Hommell as the killer.

Smith took the stand in his own defense, and gave a story about what happened in the sand pit completely different from the story he gave police. He testified that after picking-up Vickie he drove to the sand pit at her request. At that location, he claimed, she told him that his wife was having an affair with another man. This angered Smith and he slapped her and ordered her to get out and walk home. Smith claimed that after Victoria left the vehicle, he heard "a commotion" coming from the vicinity of Chapel Road, where he saw two people approaching. Concerned for his safety, he grabbed a baseball bat from the back seat. Smith testified that the two figures were Vickie and his contemporary and friend Donald Hommell, and that Vickie was bleeding from a laceration on her head. Smith claimed that Hommell said Vickie had fallen on the roadway by the intersection. Alarmed, Smith said that he sought to bring her to a doctor and told her to get in the car. She did so, but Hommell then pulled her out and told Smith to leave. Although the bleeding girl pleaded with Smith not to leave her alone with Hommell, Smith said that's what he did. He claimed that the blood on his clothing was from the headwound Vickie received "falling" when she was with Hommell. On cross-examination, Smith claimed that he did not tell the story during his police interview, when he gave a contradictory statement, because he feared retribution by Hommell. Hommell had been one of many persons questioned by police during the investigation, and was called to the stand at trial. He explained that he was working for his pharmacy employer on the fateful evening, and did not get off work until after Vickie's abduction (in other words, he had an alibi). In addition, police had examined Hommell's clothes and found no blood stains. Witnesses established that the blood stains on Smith's clothing and in the car Smith was driving were Type O—Vickie's blood type—and that Smith was Type A.

The State's theory at trial was that Smith attempted to sexually assault Vickie in the Mercury parked in the sandpit. She jumped out of the car and fled toward the intersection of Chapel Road and Fardale Avenue. Smith grabbed a baseball bat from the back seat and ran after her, angry at her defiance and concerned that she would report him. Near the intersection, Smith caught the girl and struck her in the head with the bat, leaving articles of her clothing (a shoe and the scarf), her hair-pin, and a bloody clump of her hair at that location. Throwing the bat into the woods, he carried or dragged his five-foot-two-inch tall victim back to the sandpit, where he beat her head in with the (recovered) rock before throwing her body down the far side of the bank. Driving off into the night, he disposed of key evidence (Vickie's purse and books, his blood-stained clothing and shoes). Affirming the conviction on appeal, the New Jersey Supreme Court described this theory as "supported by the record."

== Incarceration and release ==
The unanimous jury convicted Smith and he was sent to death row at New Jersey State Prison. Affirming the conviction and sentence, the unanimous New Jersey Supreme Court ruled that, "The record leaves no room to disturb the jury's finding." However, Smith's execution was postponed repeatedly. In 1962, Smith began a correspondence with William F. Buckley, Jr., the founder of the magazine National Review. Smith gradually managed to get Buckley to doubt his guilt, and believe that the case against him was "inherently implausible". Buckley initiated what became a national, extra-judicial campaign contending that Smith was innocent.

An article by Buckley in November 1965, published in Esquire, contended that Smith was innocent and drew national media attention:

Smith said he told Hommell during their brief conversation ... on the night of the murder just where he had discarded his pants. The woman who occupies property across the road from which Smith claimed to have thrown the pants ... swore at the trial that she had seen Hommell rummaging there the day after the murder. The pants were later found [by the police] near a well-traveled road ... Did Hommell find them, and leave them in the other location, thinking to discredit Smith's story, and make sure they would turn up?

Scrutiny of the case increased with the 1968 publication of Smith's well-received book Brief Against Death by leading American publishing house Alfred A. Knopf, also urging his innocence. In connection with the writing and editing of that book Smith romanced his Knopf editor in letters and during her visits to his prison. In response to Buckley's writing and Brief Against Death, in 1972 the book Counterpoint - The Edgar Smith Case, was published by Ronald E. Calissi, containing a transcript of the trial, copies of various documentary trial exhibits, a synopsis of the appeals to date, and a variety of other case facts.

In 1971, Smith was successful with his 19th appeal, in which an elite legal team retained by Buckley claimed, inter alia, that his confession was obtained under duress. At the time, the validity of confessions in police custody was a heavily litigated subject (in 1966 the United States Supreme Court decided Miranda v. Arizona requiring "Miranda" warnings prior to custodial questioning). Despite a multitude of prior judges having determined that Smith's confession was voluntary, in 1971 federal judge John Joseph Gibbons ruled that Smith's 1957 statement was involuntary and coerced by police. Judge Gibbons vacated the 1957 New Jersey conviction and ordered the State to conduct a new trial at which Smith's statement to police was to be excluded from evidence. Faced with retrying the 14-year-old case without Smith's statement, Smith was offered a time-served sentence if he accepted a charge of second degree murder. He accepted the deal and on December 6, 1971 was released from prison at age 37. Prior to accepting the plea deal, Bergen County Superior Court Judge Morris Pashman stated at a plea hearing that he had examined all aspects of the case, including the evidence from the 1957 trial, had read Smith's book Brief Against Death, and had "arranged for Edgar Smith to be examined by a doctor of my choice." Judge Pashman stated that the new psychiatrist, Dr. Ralph Brancale, had concluded that Smith was a changed man, and "there is nothing in the personality pattern that would suggest the probability of a recurring similar offense, or that manifests other antisocial behavior." In short, "the prospects for the future are good." Promptly upon Smith's release, Buckley brought him to a television studio to tape a talk between the two men on Buckley's show, Firing Line. In public statements after his release, Smith claimed that he was in fact innocent, and only accepted the plea deal to get out of prison.

In the wake of his release Smith lectured at a number of colleges and made television and radio appearances, including talk shows hosted by David Frost, Mike Douglas, Merv Griffin, and Barbara Walters, also giving multiple keynote speeches garnering up to $1,000 per appearance. In 1973 he published another book, Getting Out, and argued for penal reform. As his celebrity status gradually declined, he began drinking heavily and got into debt.

== Second attack ==
In San Diego, California, in October 1976, Smith kidnapped 33-year-old Lefteriya "Lisa" Ozbun, holding a knife at her throat and forcing her into a car. As Smith drove off with Lisa, she struggled to get out of his car and he stabbed her in the chest. She managed to jump out of the moving car with Smith's knife in her chest as he lost control and drove off the road. Regaining control of the car, Smith drove away as a nearby witness made a note of the car's license plate. Police found that the car was registered to Smith's new wife, Paige Dana Heimer, and began searching for Smith. After nearly two weeks as a fugitive, Smith checked into a Las Vegas hotel under a false name and telephoned Buckley seeking help. Buckley called the FBI and Smith was arrested.

== Second incarceration ==
Smith's second crime drew media attention to Buckley, Smith's defenders, and the psychiatrist who cleared his return to public life. Buckley, a law and order conservative, later wrote a 1979 article expressing his regret about how Smith had won him over.

Lisa Ozbun survived Smith's 1976 attack and testified against him at trial. Convicted, Smith attempted to get a reduced sentence by claiming that he was an emotionally disturbed sex offender. He cited his 1957 murder of Vickie Zielinski in support of this claim, belatedly admitting to having killed the 15-year-old. His attempt failed: Smith was sentenced to life in prison for attempted murder and kidnapping with intent to rob.

In the 1980s and 1990s Smith contested his sentencing in the courts, but this time his efforts were turned down. In later years his health deteriorated, and he suffered several heart attacks in custody.

In 1989, Smith was up for parole, but the prospect of his release sparked protests. He was denied parole in April 2009. Smith was incarcerated at California Medical Facility in Vacaville, California until his death on March 20, 2017. Smith's death was not publicly revealed until more than six months later.
