= Thomas Trantino =

American convicted murderer (born 1938)

Thomas Trantino (born February 11, 1938) is an American convicted murderer who was sentenced to life in prison for the execution style shooting deaths in 1963 of two police officers in Lodi, New Jersey. He was sentenced to death by electrocution, which was commuted to life in prison after capital punishment was suspended in the 1970s. This began a long battle for parole, which continued until his release from prison in 2002.

Trantino grew up in Williamsburg, Brooklyn. He was expelled from school for truancy, became a drug addict in his early teens and served the remainder of his teenage years in jail for robbery.

== Murders ==
Responding to reports of a disturbance at the Angel Lounge on U.S. Route 46 in Lodi on August 26, 1963, Sgt. Peter Voto and P.O. Gary Tedesco were dispatched to follow up on the call. Voto entered the bar — leaving behind Tedesco, a probationary officer who could not carry a weapon — and was immediately ambushed by Frank Falco and Thomas Trantino, who were there to celebrate a successful robbery. When Voto did not return, Tedesco went into the bar and was also ambushed. Both were tortured and killed execution style. Falco was shot while resisting arrest and killed in Manhattan by officers of the New York City Police Department.

On August 29, a funeral for the 21-year-old Tedesco was held at Our Lady of Mount Virgin Roman Catholic Church in Garfield, New Jersey and a separate service for 40-year-old Sgt. Voto was held at St. Joseph's Church in Lodi, with more than 1,000 officers representing 40 different departments in attendance, a memorial described as the largest such funeral in New Jersey police history. Governor of New Jersey Richard J. Hughes flew in from Trenton, New Jersey to offer his condolences to the respective families.

== Arrest and conviction ==
Trantino was placed under arrest after turning himself in at the East 22nd Street Station in Manhattan on August 28 after 66 hours in hiding; he was arraigned and the case was adjourned until September 17 with Trantino held in jail without bail. Trantino's attorney described both of the accused killers as "gentlemen", saying that Trantino had never killed anyone and that the half-Jewish, half-Italian Trantino was called "Rabbi Tom" because he was so kind to others.

Trantino was transferred from New York on September 26, 1963, after an extradition hearing, transported in leg irons and accompanied by Bergen County first assistant prosecutor Fred C. Galda.

In his summation at the February 1964 trial, held at the Bergen County Court House, prosecutor Guy W. Calissi said that Trantino had pistol whipped Sgt. Voto, forced him to undress and shot both Voto and Tedesco after the second officer entered the bar. Trantino's attorney argued that both officers had been shot and killed by Falco and that Trantino—who had been previously jailed on a robbery charge and had a history of addiction to narcotics—had been too drunk to have committed the crime. On February 19, 1964, the jury of seven men and women took 7 hours and 20 minutes to find Trantino guilty.

The jury's decision not to recommend mercy had the consequence that the death sentence would be imposed. Trantino's attorney Albert S. Gross recommended a life sentence, saying "isn't a lifetime in prison enough?" On February 28, Bergen County Judge Joseph W. Marini sentenced Trantino to death in the electric chair to take place in the week of April 5. At the sentencing, Trantino's attorney argued against the death penalty, stating that "legalized murder was no better than criminal murder".

== Prison ==
Trantino was originally sent to Trenton State Prison where he sat on Death row. After New Jersey abolished the death penalty in the state in 1971, Trantino was sent to Rahway State Prison.

While in prison at Rahway, Trantino pursued an interest in poetry and art. His paintings were described by The New York Times in a 1973 article as being reminiscent of Pablo Picasso. The firm of Alfred A. Knopf agreed to publish two books of his works.

In 1974, Trantino was one of five prison inmates found to have organized an illegal mass meeting attended by 200 inmates in which the subject was believed to be criticism of the prison's administration. The group of 200 had started meeting and refused to disperse for 30 minutes after guards ordered them to end the meeting, citing the explosive security risk arising from such a gathering. The five leaders, including Rubin "Hurricane" Carter, were transferred to other prisons around the state.

== Parole ==
Trantino's sentence had been commuted on January 17, 1972, to a single life sentence, which would make him eligible for parole in 1977, after serving 15 years in jail. Under the Parole Act of 1979, the parole board could require the sentencing judge to set restitution as a condition of parole, with Trantino being the first case under the law after two previous parole applications had failed. The New Jersey State Parole Board was willing to release him once arrangements were made for making restitution to the survivors and Judge Theodore Trautwein took responsibility for setting the amounts as the original sentencing judge had retired ten years earlier. In September 1980, 500 police officers protested at the steps of the Court House in Hackensack, joining the families of the slain officers in arguing that Trantino should remain in jail and that compensation would not be accepted in exchange for the deaths of the two police officers.

Judge Trautwein refused to set a restitution amount, saying, "It would be a gruesome, illogical, self-evident act of futility to order the restoration of the victims' lives." Without the restitution arrangements, Trantino's parole had been rejected and he remained in jail beyond the judge's death.

In 1982, the New Jersey Supreme Court ruled in a case filed by Trantino to uphold a law that requires restitution as a condition of parole, limiting such payments to medical costs, funeral expenses, lost property and wages over a limited period of time. The court's opinion questioned if the 18 years Trantino had spent in prison were adequate, stating that "it is hard to imagine that Trantino has been sufficiently punished to be considered rehabilitated", though it did not place any restrictions on the parole board's authority to release him. In November 1982, the Parole Board ruled that "rehabilitation has not been sufficiently achieved" and that "the shocking nature of the homicides" Trantino committed as "part of a continuing pattern of antisocial behavior usually involving the use of force", would require him to serve an additional ten years in prison, though he could be released in 5½ years for good behavior.

In January 1988, two members of the State Parole Board approved Trantino's release, though the decision could be taken up by all seven members of the Board if a new hearing was requested. In February, a group of 2,000 residents, police and politicians protested the possible parole. When the full parole board met in March 1988, its members voted 4–3 against releasing Trantino on parole.

In his fifth appearance before the parole board, in November 1990, the full board voted against parole and set his next eligibility data for 1994, with the possibility of an earlier date with good behavior.

In November 1998, the New Jersey Department of Corrections rejected Trantino's request to be placed in a halfway house on the basis of the results of an intensive evaluation of the inmate, which indicated that Trantino was still a risk to commit further crimes and would be unable to adapt to a community setting. He had been transferred from Riverfront State Prison in Camden, New Jersey to a facility in Kearny for the review, and was then transferred to South Woods State Prison once his request was rejected.

At a parole hearing in November 1999, by which time Trantino had become the longest-serving inmate in the New Jersey prison system, the board decided that Trantino was still a danger to society on the basis of his pattern of lies about the murders and would have to serve another 4½ years in prison before being eligible for parole.

A three-member panel of the New Jersey Superior Court, Appellate Division ordered the Department of Corrections in June 2000 to release Trantino within 30 days and to immediately transfer him to a halfway house or residential center in advance of his release, on the basis of their finding that the parole board's decisions in the case were unreasonable. New Jersey Attorney General John J. Farmer, Jr. appealed the ruling. In his fourth appeal to the New Jersey Supreme Court, its members voted in January 2001 by a 4–1 margin (with two justices not participating because of potential conflicts in the case) that he should be sent to a halfway house in advance of his ultimate release, calling it long overdue and the result of public pressure to keep him in jail. In its ruling, the court stated that Trantino had satisfied the terms of release and did not pose a danger to commit any further crimes once paroled. He would have to spend a year in a halfway house before being released. He would not be able to leave the halfway house at all for several months and could be allowed to hold a job, with major restrictions.

On February 11, 2001, his 63rd birthday, Trantino was relocated to a halfway house in Camden. There he would be held inside for 24 hours a day in a facility operated by Volunteers of America, until he is deemed ready for a job.

Trantino was finally released on February 11, 2002, after spending 38 years in the New Jersey prison system, making him the longest-serving prisoner in the state as of the time of his parole.
