= Golden E. Johnson =

American politician, attorney, and jurist

Golden Elizabeth Johnson (1944 – April 25, 2010) was an American Democratic Party politician, attorney, and jurist. She was the first African-American woman to serve as a Newark, New Jersey Municipal Court Judge.

== Life ==
G. Elizabeth Johnson was born to Lucy Johnson and LeRoy Johnson. She graduated in 1961 from East Side High School in 1961, and received a B.S. degree in Microbiology from Douglass College-Rutgers University in 1964. She worked as a researcher and graduated Rutgers University Law School in 1971. She worked for the Hoffmann-La Roche pharmaceutical company before her appointment to the bench. She was appointed to the bench by Mayor Kenneth A. Gibson in 1974.

Golden Johnson was a member of the CLA. "It was the activism of Black law students during the late 1960's after the Newark riots that caused them, along with several Black attorneys, to organize the Concerned Legal Associates ("CLA"). Their members included attorneys, Isaac McNatt, CLA's first president, Pearl Crosby and Geneva Sanford, along with students, George Logan, Kathy Mitchell, Betty Lester and Rita Murphy."

Judge Johnson resigned from the bench in 1980 to challenge House Judiciary Committee Chairman Peter W. Rodino in the Democratic primary for the seat of New Jersey's District 10 in the US House of Representatives. Rodino won with 62% of the vote, followed by former Essex County Freeholder Donald M. Payne with 23%. Johnson finished third with 12%, followed by former Essex County Freeholder Russell E. Fox with 3%.

Johnson worked on discrimination cases as Director of the Community Legal Action Workshop, a program of the American Civil Liberties Union. She served as Municipal Court Judge in Montclair, New Jersey, and as an Assistant Essex County Prosecutor from 1995 until her death in 2010.

== See also ==
- List of African-American jurists
- List of first women lawyers and judges in New Jersey
