= Theodore Trautwein =

American judge (1920–2000)

Theodore Walter Trautwein (March 29, 1920 – August 17, 2000) was an American judge from New Jersey who presided over issues related to release of reporter's notes that arose from the 1978 murder trial of "Dr. X" physician Mario Jascalevich, in which Trautwein held a reporter from The New York Times in contempt for refusing to turn over these investigative notes and held the reporter involved in jail for 40 days, triggering a separate set of cases on the limits of shield laws in protecting journalists from testifying about information they collected from their sources.

== Early life and education ==
Trautwein was born in Paramus, New Jersey on March 29, 1920, attended Hackensack High School and earned a baseball scholarship at Columbia University. He was drafted by the St. Louis Cardinals as a pitcher, but needed to work to help support his family and got a job as a stevedore. After attending the United States Merchant Marine Academy, he served in the United States Navy during World War II. Following the completion of his military service, he attended New York University and earned his law degree from the New York University School of Law, passing the bar in 1953.

== Judicial career ==
As a county court judge starting in 1964, and later as a district court judge, Trautwein issued rulings that supported creation of the New Jersey Meadowlands Commission to provide state oversight of development in the New Jersey Meadowlands and of the New Jersey Sports and Exposition Authority, which brought horse racing and professional sports to the Meadowlands.

He was named as a New Jersey Superior Court, Appellate Division judge in 1981.

=== Dr. X. trial and shield laws ===
In 1978, the "Dr. X" murder trial of Mario Jascalevich, a physician who had been charged with murdering three of his patients at an Oradell, New Jersey hospital with curare was brought to trial. The cases had occurred in the mid-1960s and the Bergen County Prosecutor's Office had declined to pursue the cases at the time. In 1976, reporter M. A. Farber of The New York Times wrote a series of articles that exposed the cases, with the public attention and outcry leading the Bergen County Prosecutor to reopen the cases, exhume and test the bodies for curare, and file charges against Dr. Jascalevich after the muscle relaxant was found by chemical analysis.

Attorney Raymond A. Brown blamed other doctors at the hospital of framing Jascalevich to cover up their own ineptitude and charged that Farber had conspired with prosecutors to advance their respective careers by pointing the finger of blame at Jascalevich. After Brown subpoenaed the reporter, Farber testified in the case but cited the First Amendment of the United States Constitution when he refused to turn over thousands of pages of the reporter's notes that the defense had requested, citing a compelling right to protect the identity of the sources used in the articles from individuals who had spoken to him with the expectation that their confidence would be maintained. Time magazine called the deadlock "a head-on collision between the First and Sixth Amendments", citing the conflict between the reporter's and newspaper's right of freedom of the press and the defendant's right to a fair trial. Trial judge William J. Arnold had Judge Trautwein address the issues related to the release of the papers in his role as an assignment judge for all Bergen County courts. In July 1978, Trautwein sentenced Farber to six months in jail and assessed fines of $5,000 each day to The Times, saying that Farber had chosen placing "your privilege and your concept of your constitutional rights above the rights of the people of this state and this defendant"

With several breaks for appeals, Farber ended up spending a total 40 days in the Bergen County Jail and was not released until October 24 after Jascalevich was acquitted. The New Jersey Supreme Court upheld Trautwein's decision and stripped reports of shield law protections, though the New Jersey Legislature responded by passing even stronger shield laws to protect reporters. Governor of New Jersey Brendan Byrne pardoned Farber in 1982 and $100,000 of the fines were reimbursed to the newspaper.

Trautwein's actions in regard to Farber have been used as a case study in both law schools and schools of journalism. Jane E. Kirtley of the Reporters Committee for Freedom of the Press cited how "Farber's case roused journalists out of their complacency", noting that "Going to jail for more than a month is significant in anyone's eyes."

=== Trantino parole ===
Thomas Trantino had been sentenced to life in prison for the shooting deaths in 1963 of two police officers in Lodi, New Jersey. The New Jersey State Parole Board was willing to release him once arrangements were made for making restitution to the survivors and in 1980 assigned Trautwein responsibility for setting the amounts. Trautwein refused to do so, saying, "It would be a gruesome, illogical, self-evident act of futility to order the restoration of the victims' lives." Without the restitution arrangements, Trantino's parole had been rejected and he remained in jail beyond Trautwein's death. He was finally released in 2002, after spending 38 years in jail.

== Death ==
A resident of Hollywood, Florida for the two years before his death, Trautwein died there at age 80 on August 17, 2000, of heart failure. He was survived by his wife, Lorna, a daughter, a son and four grandchildren.
