= Aldona E. Appleton =

American judge from New Jersey (1900-1997)

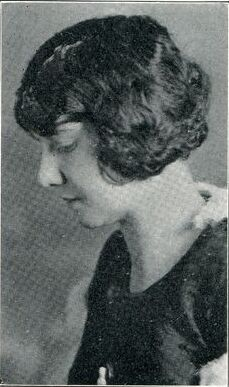
- Born: Aldona Eugenie Leszczynski; September 9, 1900; Perth Amboy, New Jersey, U.S.
- Died: April 17, 1997 (aged 96); Cranbury, New Jersey, U.S.
- Occupations: Lawyer; politician; judge
- Spouse: Peter Appleton (m. 1933)

Aldona Eugenie Leszczynski Appleton (September 9, 1900 – April 17, 1997) was an American judge, lawyer, and politician. She was the first full-time female judge on the Superior Court of New Jersey and the second female judge in the history of New Jersey.

Aldona Eugenie Leszczynski was born on September 9, 1900 in Perth Amboy, New Jersey, the daughter of Polish immigrants Thaddeus Leszczynski and Leokadya (Lottie) Mieszkowski Leszczynski. She graduated from Perth Amboy High School in 1918 and earned a Bachelor of Science degree from the New Jersey College for Women in 1924. Balking at a medical career due to the cost of education, she worked as a part-time teacher to fund her law school education. She graduated from the New Jersey Law School in 1929, one of eleven female graduates in a class of 900.

After graduation, she practiced family law in Perth Amboy. In 1933, she married pianist, bandleader, and professional baseball player Peter Appleton. His original last name was Jablonowski, but changed it to Appleton ("jablon" is Polish for apple) just before their marriage. Pete Appleton offered several different rationales for the change, but Bill James suggests that Aldona Appleton "couldn't stomach the prospect of going through the rest of her life as Aldora Lescynski Jablonowski."

Appleton became active in the Middlesex County Democratic Party and worked as an aide for David T. Wilentz, the Attorney General of New Jersey. Wilentz had Appleton appointed deputy clerk for the Middlesex County courts in the 1940s. In 1952, she ran as the Democratic candidate for the United States House of Representatives in New Jersey's 5th congressional district, losing to Peter Frelinghuysen Jr. with only 37.8% of the vote.

In 1958, she was appointed to the newly formed Juvenile and Domestic Relations Court, a post she held until her mandatory retirement in 1970. Following the deaths of her husband and brother, she returned to the bench in 1975 as a recall judge, a temporary assignment for retired judges that in her case lasted fourteen years, until 1989.

Appleton died on April 17, 1997 in Cranbury, New Jersey.
