= Dr. X killings =

Suspicious deaths in 1966

The "Dr. X" killings were a series of suspicious deaths by curare poisoning, in 1966 at a Bergen County, New Jersey hospital. A newspaper investigation during the mid-1970s led to the indictment of an Argentina-born physician, Mario Enrique Jascalevich (August 27, 1927 – September 1984), in 1976. He was acquitted at trial in 1978.

== Career ==
Jascalevich was born in Buenos Aires on August 27, 1927. After completing his medical training in Argentina, he came to the United States to perform an internship at Passaic General Hospital in 1955, setting up his practice in New Jersey. He was hired as a surgeon by Riverdell Hospital in Oradell, New Jersey in 1962 and developed a surgical stapler that was named for him. At the time of his murder trial, he was a resident of Englewood Cliffs, New Jersey.

== Initial investigation ==
In 1966, authorities with the Bergen County, New Jersey prosecutor, including Guy W. Calissi, launched an investigation of nine suspicious deaths at Riverdell Hospital in Oradell. The patients had been admitted to the hospital for surgery and died of unrelated causes, before or after routine surgical procedures.

The investigation was commenced on November 1, 1966, after eighteen vials of curare – most nearly empty – were found in a locker assigned to Dr. Mario Jascalevich. When confronted, he explained that he had been experimenting with dogs. No motive could be ascertained for homicide. Ten years passed before the state charged Jascalevich with five counts of murder, in May 1976.

== Newspaper investigation ==
The case had lain dormant for a decade when The New York Times received a letter from a woman claiming that as many as 40 patients had been murdered at a hospital by its chief surgeon. The letter handed to reporter M. A. Farber offered no information as to where the alleged murders had occurred or who the murderer was, if there was anything at all to the letter.

Farber pursued the case by speaking with someone in the forensic toxicology field who was able to recall a case at Riverdell Hospital, a private medical facility that had since closed. Further investigation led to the identification of Dr. Mario Jascalevich as the hospital's chief surgeon. While Jascalevich's surgical patients routinely survived, those of a new surgeon were dying at a significantly high rate. This new surgeon, together with directors of the hospital, opened Jascalevich's locker on October 31, 1966, and found 18 near empty vials of curare, a powerful muscle relaxant that could cause death if not administered in conjunction with artificial respiration.

The hospital reported their findings to the Bergen County, New Jersey prosecutor's office and its chief at the time, Guy W. Calissi. Farber was given the opportunity to review the files from the 1966 investigation, and found a comment from Calissi that said that "someone is lying". Though Calissi's suspicions were strong, he and his assistant Fred C. Galda had come to the conclusion at the time that hard evidence did not exist to move further with the case. When Farber contacted Calissi in 1975, Calissi called the claim that the circumstances of the deaths were plausible to be "horsesh-t" and remained convinced that his suspicions in the case were accurate that there had been criminal actions involved in the deaths.

Farber's investigations led him to try to contact the families of the potential victims, in some cases notifying relatives for the first time that the deaths had been deemed suspicious. His attempts to contact Jascalevich, then in private practice, were all unsuccessful despite repeated letters, phone calls and even attempts to approach him outside of his offices. Farber tried to follow up on Jascalevich's statement in his 1966 deposition that the curare had been used in experiments on dying dogs, but was unable to get any confirmation that dogs had been supplied to him as described.

The results of Farber's investigation were first published in The Times in January 1976, referring to the unidentified physician as "Dr. X", and caused a media stir. The Record, the largest paper in the area, picked up the story, covering it with as many as 13 reporters. Other papers nationwide picked up the story as well.

Bergen County Prosecutor Woodcock opened an independent investigation, exhuming the bodies of five possible victims, none of whom had been administered curare during their surgical procedures. Using new technologies, investigators found traces of curare in three of the bodies.

== Trial ==
The Bergen County grand jury issued an indictment on May 18, 1976, charging Jascalevich with the deaths of five patients – Emma Arzt (age 70), Frank Biggs (age 59), Margaret Henderson (age 26), Carl Rohrbeck (age 73) and Nancy Savino (age 4) – and having injected them with curare to kill them. Once brought to trial, two of the murder counts were dismissed.

The prosecution was led by Sybil Moses, an assistant prosecutor who was four years out of law school. Jascalevich was represented by attorney Raymond A. Brown. At trial, in 1978, two of the murder counts were dismissed for lack of evidence. Brown filed a subpoena requesting that Farber turn over all of his notes and other writings related to 193 potential witnesses in the case, what Farber would later call "the broadest subpoena ever issued to an American reporter". After 34 weeks of testimony, Jascalevich was acquitted by jurors on October 24, 1978.

=== Possible victims ===
Possible victims include:

- Carl Rohrbeck, age 73, died December 13, 1965
- Nancy Savino, age 4, March 21, 1966.
- Margaret Henderson, 26, April 23, 1966.
- Edith Post, age 62, May 17, 1966.
- Ira Holster, age 64, July 29, 1966.
- Frank Biggs, age 59, August 27, 1966
- Mary Muentener, age 80, September 1, 1966.
- Emma Arzt, age 70, September 23, 1966.
- Eileen Shaw, 36, October 23, 1966.

== Post-acquittal ==
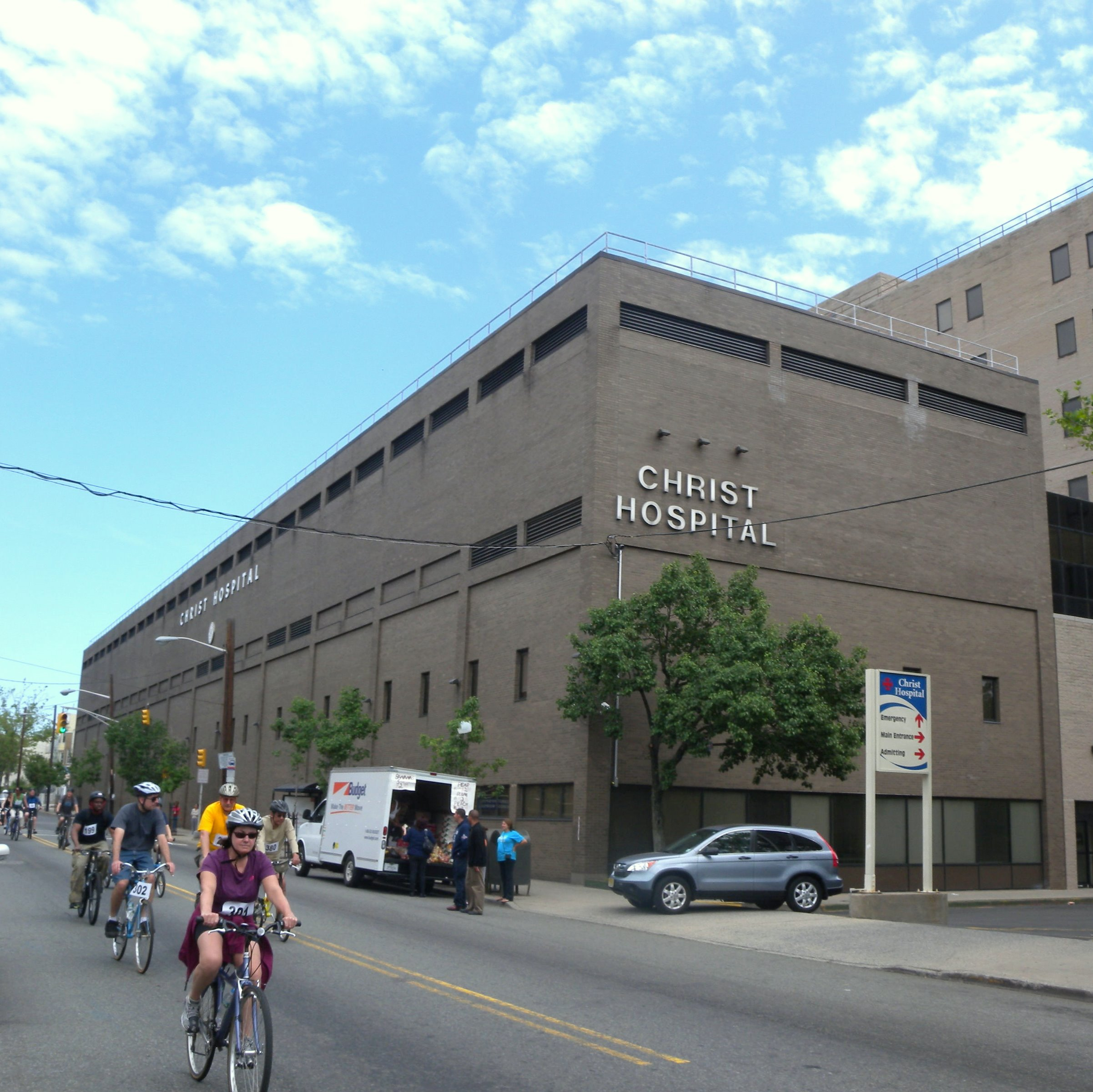
Christ Hospital

In October 1980, the New Jersey Board of Medical Examiners revoked Jascalevich's license to practice medicine in the State of New Jersey, finding by a vote of 11–0 that Jascalevich was guilty of "gross malpractice or gross negligence and failure of good moral character". Jascalevich had voluntarily surrendered his license in 1976 after being indicted in the criminal case for which he was later acquitted. The state found fraudulently prepared operation records in one case, and in another that he had made a diagnosis of cancer that "he knew or should have known" was false. Both patients had been admitted to Christ Hospital and had been from Jersey City, New Jersey. At the time that his New Jersey license was taken away, Jascalevich was practicing in the Bronx with a valid New York State license.

In January 1982, Governor of New Jersey Brendan Byrne issued a pardon to reporter M.A. Farber and ordered that $101,000 in fines be returned to The Times. The paper's attorney, Floyd Abrams, was planning efforts to file for return of the additional $185,000 that had been assessed in civil contempt fines.

In June 1984, Riverdell Hospital on Kinderkamack Road in Oradell was demolished. A former administrator of the hospital told a newspaper reporter that admissions had dropped significantly once the hospital and doctor were identified in the media, and that the hospital's ability to attract qualified physicians had been severely harmed. The 80-bed hospital changed its name to Northern Community Hospital in 1979. By 1981 the decision was made to close the hospital, as only a third of its patient beds were filled and the hospital was losing a quarter of a million dollars annually. Efforts to turn the site into an alcohol rehabilitation center were turned down and the site became a target of vandalism. A 300-bed nursing home was proposed to fill the empty site of the demolished building.

== Death ==
After losing his license to practice medicine, Jascalevich returned to Argentina. He died in September 1984 in Mar del Plata from a cerebral hemorrhage, aged 57, although the death was not reported to the public for several months, until an obituary appeared in The New York Times. The deaths at Riverdell remain unsolved although Jascalevich is assumed by some to have been guilty.

== See also ==
- John Bodkin Adams
- Theodore Rinaldo
- Harold Shipman
