= Fred C. Galda =

American judge and politician (1918–1997)

Frederick C. Galda (April 12, 1918 – August 14, 1997) was an American attorney and Democratic Party politician from New Jersey who served as a prosecutor in the Thomas Trantino murder case, as a judge on the New Jersey Superior Court who issued the state's first ruling acquitting a woman of murder based on a battered woman defense and served as mayor of Paramus, New Jersey.

Raised in Cliffside Park, New Jersey, where his hair earned him the nickname "Red", Galda was a star player on the Cliffside Park High School football team and was the placekicker for the Michigan State Spartans football team, before attending John Marshall Law School and being admitted to the bar in New Jersey.

== Mayor of Paramus ==
Galda was elected as a Democrat in 1952 to serve as mayor of Paramus, New Jersey, after nearly two decades of Republican control. He took an active role as mayor, and was known to ride garbage trucks after borough residents complained about trash pickup and to ride on snowplows during bad storms. Galda was a participant at the ribbon cutting ceremony on May 1, 1957, for the newly opened Garden State Plaza. Galda was mayor in September 1958 when the borough fully imposed its own blue laws that restricted the opening of stores on Sundays, as part of an effort to deal with massive traffic congestion on Route 4 and Route 17, Galda was re-elected six times and served as mayor until 1964, overseeing the building boom and shopping center developments that transformed Paramus from a quiet farming community to a center of commerce.

== Campaign for State Senator ==
When incumbent Walter H. Jones did not seek re-election to run for the 1961 Republican nomination for Governor, Galda became the Democratic candidate for the open State Senate seat. He lost to Republican Assemblyman Pierce H. Deamer Jr., 160,125 (55.8%) to 124,492 (43.4%).

== Prosecutor ==
He served as a Bergen County, New Jersey, prosecutor in the trial of Thomas Trantino, charged with the execution-style murder of two police officers in 1963 at a bar on U.S. Route 46 in Lodi. Trantino was convicted and sentenced to death, but his death sentence was commuted to a single life term after the death penalty was abolished in the state in 1972. Trantino would face a battle to be released on parole, and was not paroled until 2002.

== Judge ==
He was appointed as a judge on the New Jersey Superior Court in 1967 by Governor of New Jersey Richard J. Hughes, and served in that post until 1983, when he stepped down from the bench, having been the presiding judge of the criminal court division. The Record had challenged his nomination, citing in an editorial its belief that he lacked the temperament for the post, as "An impatient and emotional man does not become cool and calm by sitting behind a judge's desk".

In a 1981 case, Dorothy Rapp's husband had pulled her out of bed, ripping out clumps of hair, before beating and threatening to kill her. She took a loaded rifle and killed her husband. At trial, he allowed Rapp's attorney to claim that the action had been taken in self-defense, making him the first judge in New Jersey to accept a battered woman defense in a spousal killing.

== Personal ==
After stepping down from the bench and until 1995, he had been a lawyer with the firm of George A. Vaccaro.

A resident of Saddle River, New Jersey, at the time of his death, Galda died at age 79 on August 14, 1997, at The Valley Hospital in Ridgewood, New Jersey, because of a long illness. He was survived by his wife, the former Ellen Molloy, as well as by five sons, eight grandchildren, and two great-grandchildren.

Political offices
| Preceded by Emil J. Geering | Mayor of Paramus, New Jersey; 1953–1964 | Succeeded by Robert Inglima |
