= M. A. Farber =

American journalist (born c.1938)

Myron A. Farber (born c. 1938) is an American newspaper reporter for The New York Times, whose investigations into the deaths of several patients at an Oradell, New Jersey, hospital led to the murder trial of Mario Jascalevich, a physician at the hospital who was alleged to have used a powerful muscle relaxant in what became known as the "Dr. X" case. After refusing to turn over notes from his investigation in response to a subpoena from the defense attorney in the case, Farber was jailed for contempt and the newspaper fined, ending up spending 40 days in jail with fines of $285,000 assessed. Appealed to the Supreme Court of the United States, the case set a precedent for the limitations of Reporters' privilege shield laws in the United States.

== "Dr. X" case ==
=== Initial investigation ===
Farber's initial involvement in what would become known as the Dr. X case began in June 1975 when the paper received a letter from a woman claiming that as many as 40 patients had been murdered at a hospital by its chief surgeon. The letter handed to him offered no information as to where the alleged murders had occurred or who the murderer was- if there was anything at all to the letter.

Farber pursued the case by speaking with someone in the forensic toxicology field who was able to recall a case at Riverdell Hospital, a private medical facility that had since closed. Further investigation led to the identification of Mario Jascalevich as the hospital's chief surgeon. While Jascalevich's surgical patients routinely survived, those of a new surgeon were dying at a significantly high rate. This new surgeon, together with directors of the hospital, opened Jascalevich's locker on October 31, 1966, and found 18 near-empty vials of curare, a powerful muscle relaxant that could cause death if not administered in conjunction with artificial respiration.

=== Trial and jail ===
Attorney Raymond A. Brown blamed other doctors at the hospital of framing Jascalevich to cover up their own ineptitude and charged that Farber had conspired with prosecutors to advance their respective careers by pointing the finger of blame at Jascalevich. After Brown subpoenaed the reporter, Farber testified in the case but cited the First Amendment of the United States Constitution when he refused to turn over thousands of pages of the reporter's notes that the defense had requested, citing a compelling right to protect the identity of the sources used in the articles from individuals who had spoken to him with the expectation that their confidence would be maintained. Time magazine called the deadlock "a head-on collision between the First and Sixth Amendments", citing the conflict between the reporter's and newspaper's right of Freedom of the Press and the defendant's Right to a fair trial. Trial judge William J. Arnold had Judge Theodore Trautwein address the issues related to the release of the papers in his role as assignment judge for all Bergen County courts. In July 1978, Trautwein sentenced Farber to six months in jail and assessed fines of $5,000 each day to The Times, saying that Farber had chosen placing "your privilege and your concept of your constitutional rights above the rights of the people of this state and this defendant"

When Farber was about to be jailed, his attorneys filed for an emergency stay on a weekend and New Jersey Supreme Court Justice Morris Pashman arrived in his golfing attire to grant the stay. When the full court heard the case the next day, Pashman was the only dissenter as the court upheld the lower court ruling and ordered that Farber serve time in jail. When the court reaffirmed the lower court action in a decision in September 1978, Pashman and fellow Justice Alan B. Handler were the only dissenters.

With several breaks for appeals, Farber ended up spending a total 40 days in the Bergen County Jail and was not released until October 24 after Jascalevich was acquitted. The New Jersey Supreme Court upheld Trautwein's decision and stripped reporters of shield law protections, though the New Jersey Legislature responded by passing even stronger shield laws to protect reporters.

Trautwein's actions in regard to Farber have been used as a case study in both law schools and schools of journalism. Jane E. Kirtley of the Reporters Committee for Freedom of the Press cited how "Farber's case roused journalists out of their complacency", noting that "Going to jail for more than a month is significant in anyone's eyes."

In November 1978, the Supreme Court of the United States refused to take the case, citing the fact that neither the United States Constitution nor existing state shield laws provide journalists with an absolute privilege to refuse to provide information demanded in a criminal case by a defendant.

=== Pardon ===
In January 1982, Governor of New Jersey Brendan Byrne issued a pardon to reporter M. A. Farber and ordered that $101,000 in fines be returned to The Times. The paper's attorney, Floyd Abrams, was planning efforts to file for the return of the additional $185,000 that had been assessed in civil contempt fines.
