= Theodore Rinaldo =

American charismatic religious leader and convicted child sex offender

Theodore Anthony Rinaldo (March 11, 1944 – February 13, 2000) was an American charismatic religious leader, businessman, and convicted child sex offender. During the 1970s, Rinaldo and his associates formed and operated a non-profit corporation, Ellogos, and several profit-making businesses based in Snohomish, Washington, including Eden Farms, Cascadian Publishing, Golden Gallery, and Ted Anthony & Associates, among others.

In 1979, Rinaldo was arrested on seven charges, including felony counts of statutory rape, indecent liberties, and intimidating a witness. Later that year, he was convicted of third-degree statutory rape for having sexual intercourse with one minor girl and of taking indecent liberties with another.

== Early life and education ==
Rinaldo was born in 1944 in Oneida, New York into a Catholic family. He attended Oneida High School (class of 1963), but being a borderline juvenile delinquent, never earned a high school diploma. After some friends were killed in an automobile accident, he resolved to study to become a priest. However, he also explored a number of other churches, and ended up becoming the "black sheep in a Catholic family."

He attended a Bible college in New York state, but dropped out after about a year. After leaving Oneida, he worked at a variety of odd jobs, never spending more than a year in one place. In an interview with the Everett Herald, Rinaldo said that he had been an ordained minister "for a brief time", but later declined to identify the church which had ordained him.

Rinaldo eventually ended up in Tucson, Arizona, where he spoke at a religious meeting attended by Paul Goff. Goff invited Rinaldo and his family to live in his Tucson guest house, where they resided for three months.

== Move to Seattle ==
In 1969, Rinaldo moved to Seattle, Washington, accompanied by Goff. Together, they started having nightly meetings in a Seattle-area home. Rinaldo also started a leather importing business. Eventually, Goff moved back to Tucson, while Rinaldo remained in Seattle.

=== "The Group" ===
Rinaldo had been invited to the Seattle area by people who had heard him preach elsewhere. He arrived with a couple of suitcases and little in the way of funds. He attracted a broad range of followers, ranging from disillusioned former Jesus movement youths to senior citizens.

Rinaldo began holding religious meetings in a Bellevue home. Followers reported that he told them they were a group of special people who were actually sons of God. With his guidance, they were to lead the world to a better life, attracting other people through the simple goodness of their nature. They referred to their association simply as "The Group".

In the early 1970s, Rinaldo began to bring up the subject of buying property at the meetings. His followers began to donate money. One estimated that over the years, he contributed $30,000. A couple reported that they had made a $20,000 donation to Rinaldo, believing they were donating to a religious organization. A woman estimated that over 5.5 years she had contributed around $10,000, despite the fact that she had a low income and was in fact unemployed for 20 months during that period.

== Business activities ==
=== Ellogos ===
In 1971, Rinaldo formed a non-profit corporation called Ellogos with three associates, Howard Morse, Gerald Schindler, and Craig Reynolds. Together, they sought a location where the business climate seemed right for their future plans, eventually deciding on Snohomish, Washington. In 1973, Ellogos started buying land there, accumulating 60 to 80 acres of adjacent property.

Ellogos was granted tax-exempt status by the US Internal Revenue Service in 1971, listing in its application five purposes for which it was organized: religious, educational, charitable, scientific, and literary. Between 1971 and 1976, Ellogos tax returns listed over $229,000 in contributions, gifts, and grants.

The word Ellogos combined the Hebrew word El meaning 'God', and the Greek word logos meaning 'word': thus, 'Word of God'.

=== Eden Farms ===
In 1974, townspeople began to observe unusual activity on the Snohomish property. Twenty-five or thirty tents were erected in a pasture that summer. Group meetings were seen taking place on the lawns. Workers, sometimes as many as 50, were seen in the fields hoeing and picking up rocks. A sign was erected designating the enterprise as "Eden Farms". Vegetables were grown and sold at a produce stand near the road. Followers were instructed not to mention the religious aspect of the organization to outsiders.

=== Expansion and community activities ===
Over the next few years, improvements and construction took place. By 1978, there were stables and a new horse arena. A fence was erected around Rinaldo's residence, and two German Shepherds were seen on guard inside the fence.

Rinaldo also became involved in business and community activities in Snohomish. He joined the local Masonic Lodge. He and his partners purchased a building which came to house the Snohomish Chamber of Commerce, and Rinaldo became a member of its board of directors. From 1974 through 1978, Ellogos ran a Bingo game in the basement of the American Legion hall. In 1978, Rinaldo was campaign manager for the Republican candidate for Snohomish County Sheriff.

Other businesses were established, the most notable being Cascadian Publishing, which published three weekly newspapers: the Monroe Chronicle, the Lake Stevens Lookout, and the Duvall Cascadian. In addition, an art gallery (Golden Gallery), a florist (The Green House), and a carpet store (A-1 Carpet and Floor Covering) were owned or controlled by Rinaldo and his associates. Ellogos also operated the state-licensed Snohomish Preschool and Daycare.

In August 1978, Ellogos purchased a recreational property on the Stillaguamish River, sporting a three-story A-frame house with at least seven bedrooms, a bar, and a heated indoor swimming pool.

== Eden Farms investigations ==
Sometime during the spring of 1979, Eden Farms became the subject of two independent investigations, one conducted by the Snohomish County Sheriff's Department, the other led by investigative reporter Gary Larson of the Everett Herald. During the course of his investigation, Larson interviewed 14 former members of Rinaldo's organizations, only one of whom would allow his name to be used in the paper. As a result of these interviews, Larson reported the following facts:

- Ten people reported that Rinaldo was the leader of a secretive religious organization called simply "The Group".
- Eight people reported that Rinaldo had led loyalty ceremonies, similar to a communion service, in which members pledged loyalty to him.
- Five youths reported that they had lived and worked at Eden farm for little or no pay, were strictly controlled and had little freedom.
- Four people reported that Rinaldo had threatened that anyone leaving the group would experience illness or financial hardship.
- Three youths reported having been physically assaulted by Rinaldo for breaking rules or angering their superiors.
- Three women reported that Rinaldo had claimed to be Michael the Archangel, leader of the angels in the Book of Revelation.
- Three people reported that they had recently left the group after hearing stories about Rinaldo's possible sexual involvement with girls in the group.
- Two people reported that Rinaldo had told them he was compiling potentially damaging information about various members of the group.
- Two people reported that Rinaldo had prophesied world catastrophes and was planning to move "The Group" to Arkansas, where they would become "an important political force".

== Arrest, trial, and conviction ==
On July 12, 1979, Rinaldo was arrested by Snohomish County sheriff's deputies on seven charges, including felony counts of statutory rape, indecent liberties, and intimidating a witness. Immediately following his arrest, his business and religious activities were the subject of a six article series by investigative reporter Gary Larson of the Everett Herald, running from July 13 through July 19.

During his trial, prosecutors alleged that Ellogos was a secret religious organization dominated by Rinaldo by means of fear and isolation. During the first four days of testimony, five women testified that Rinaldo had touched them indecently or had sexual intercourse with them when they were young teenagers. Rinaldo's wife, Anne Sundberg Rinaldo, testified in his defense that she never saw or heard anything to suggest that he was engaging in any form of sexual misconduct. Rinaldo also testified in his own defense. Several defense witnesses, all members of Ellogos, testified that based on the opinions of six Snohomish businessmen, three of Rinaldo's accusers had "bad" reputations for telling the truth. However, the State called the businessmen as witnesses, and each of them testified that they had never formed or expressed opinions on the truthfulness of the prosecution witnesses.

On December 3, 1979, Rinaldo was convicted of third-degree statutory rape for having sexual intercourse with one minor girl and of taking indecent liberties with another. The State petitioned for a determination of sexual psychopathy, and Rinaldo was committed for a 90-day observation period to Western State Hospital. After the completion of the observation period, the trial court determined that Rinaldo was indeed a sexual psychopath and committed him for treatment at the same facility. Several months later, the Superintendent of Western State Hospital notified the court that while he agreed with the determination, the patient was not amenable to treatment, and the trial court ordered the execution of the original prison sentence.

== Appeals ==
The conviction was the subject of several notable appeals. In March 1983, The Everett Herald lost an appellate court case in the State of Washington in which it sought to quash a subpoena allowing a judicial review of confidential material gathered for articles it had published in 1979 on the cult activities of Rinaldo, who had since been convicted on charges of rape, indecent liberties, and assault. The New York Times reported that the court had ruled that "criminal defendants could force reporters to reveal confidential sources if the information was crucial to the case" and characterized the loss as "a major defeat for the news media". The Herald took the Appeals Court decision to the Washington Supreme Court in State v. Rinaldo 102 Wn.2d 749 (1984), which was heard en banc with the result that the subpoena itself was quashed on the basis that Rinaldo had not met the threshold requirements to compel such an inspection, while upholding the Court of Appeals ruling in general.

== Personal life and death ==
Rinaldo married Anne Sundberg. They had one son.

Rinaldo died on February 13, 2000, in Springdale, Arkansas. He was buried in St. Patrick's cemetery in Oneida, New York.

== Cultural references ==
Yakima Valley College speech and communications instructor Dan Erickson recounted his experiences as a victim of the Eden Farms cult in an April 2012 lecture, Cults and Blogs: From Childhood Trauma to Healing Therapy. His 2012 novel, A Train Called Forgiveness, is a fictionalized account of his coming to terms with this traumatic past.

== See also ==
- Charismatic authority
- David Berg
- Jim Jones
- Robert G. Millar
