= Riverdell Hospital =

Former hospital in New Jersey, United States

Riverdell Hospital was an 80-bed hospital at 576 Kinderkamack Road in Oradell, New Jersey in the United States. The hospital was established in 1959 and thrived for many years until it became associated with the "Dr. X" murder trial of former chief surgeon Dr. Mario Jascalevich. In an effort to revive its sinking fortunes, the hospital was renamed Northern Community Hospital in 1979, but closed in 1981 because of declining utilization and was torn down in 1984.

Jascalevich was hired as a surgeon in 1962 and developed a surgical stapler that was named for him. A series of unexplained deaths occurred in 1966. Initial investigations by the Bergen County, New Jersey prosecutor's office found the deaths to be suspicious, but did not turn up any hard evidence of criminal action in the deaths. The case lay dormant for a decade, until M. A. Farber of The New York Times ran a six-month series of articles in 1976 that disclosed the fact that there had been 13 suspicious deaths at the hospital, referring to Jascalevich using the pseudonym "Dr. X". The case went to trial, with Jascalevich charged with three murders after two of the five original counts from the indictment were dropped. After what was then the longest criminal trial in New Jersey history, Jascalevich was acquitted.

A former administrator of the hospital told a reporter from The New York Times that admissions had dropped significantly once the hospital and doctor were identified in the media, and that the hospital's ability to attract qualified physicians had been severely harmed. The 80-bed hospital changed its name to Northern Community Hospital in 1979. By 1981 the decision was made to close the hospital, as only a third of its patient beds were filled and the hospital was losing a quarter of a million dollars annually. Efforts to turn the site into an alcohol rehabilitation center were turned down and the site became a target of vandalism. In June 1984, Riverdell Hospital was demolished. Care One's Oradell Health Care Center, a 164-bed nursing home was constructed on the site.
