= Bergen County, New Jersey =

County in New Jersey, United States

- County
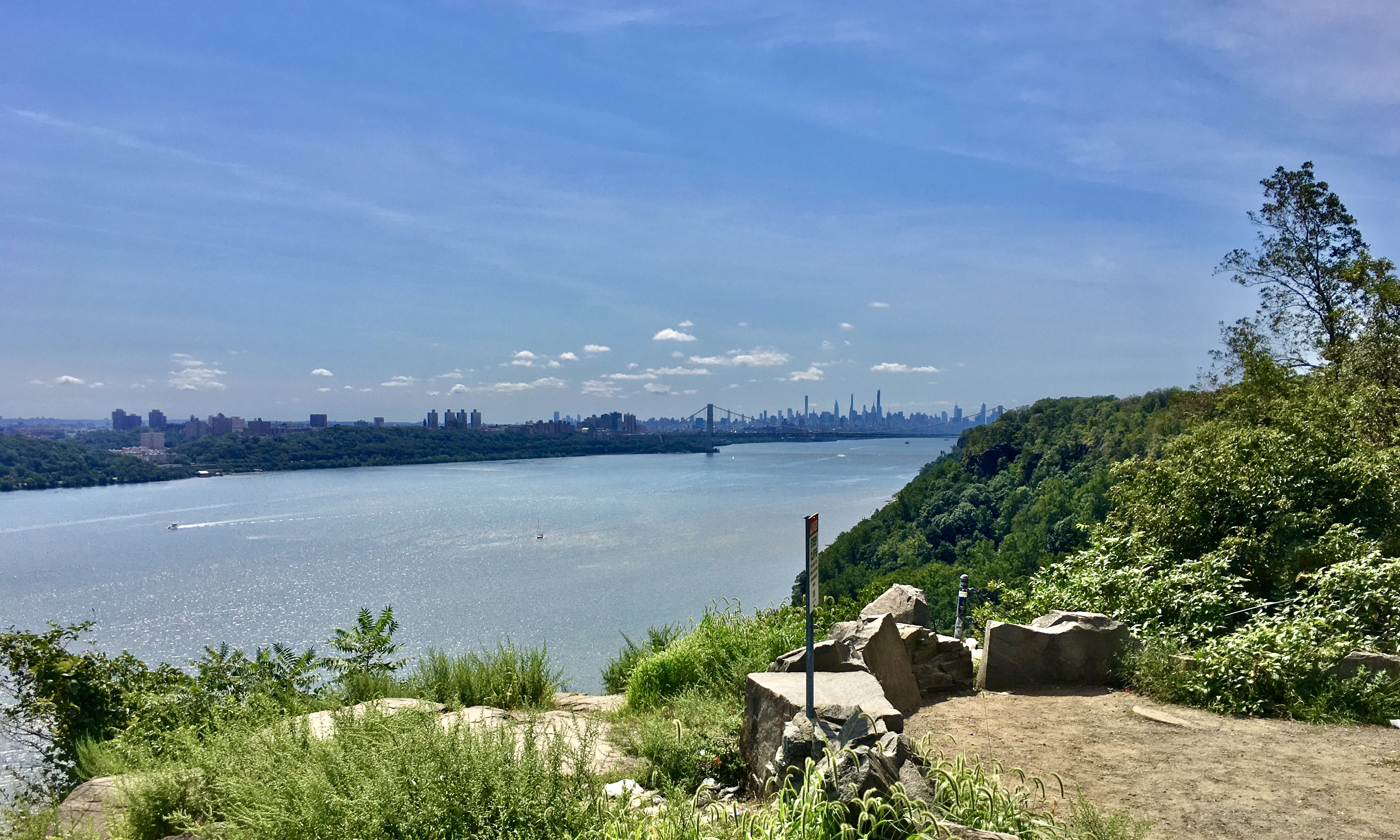
- Atop the Hudson Palisades in Englewood Cliffs, overlooking the Hudson River, the George Washington Bridge, and the skyscrapers of Midtown Manhattan

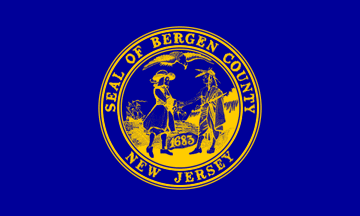
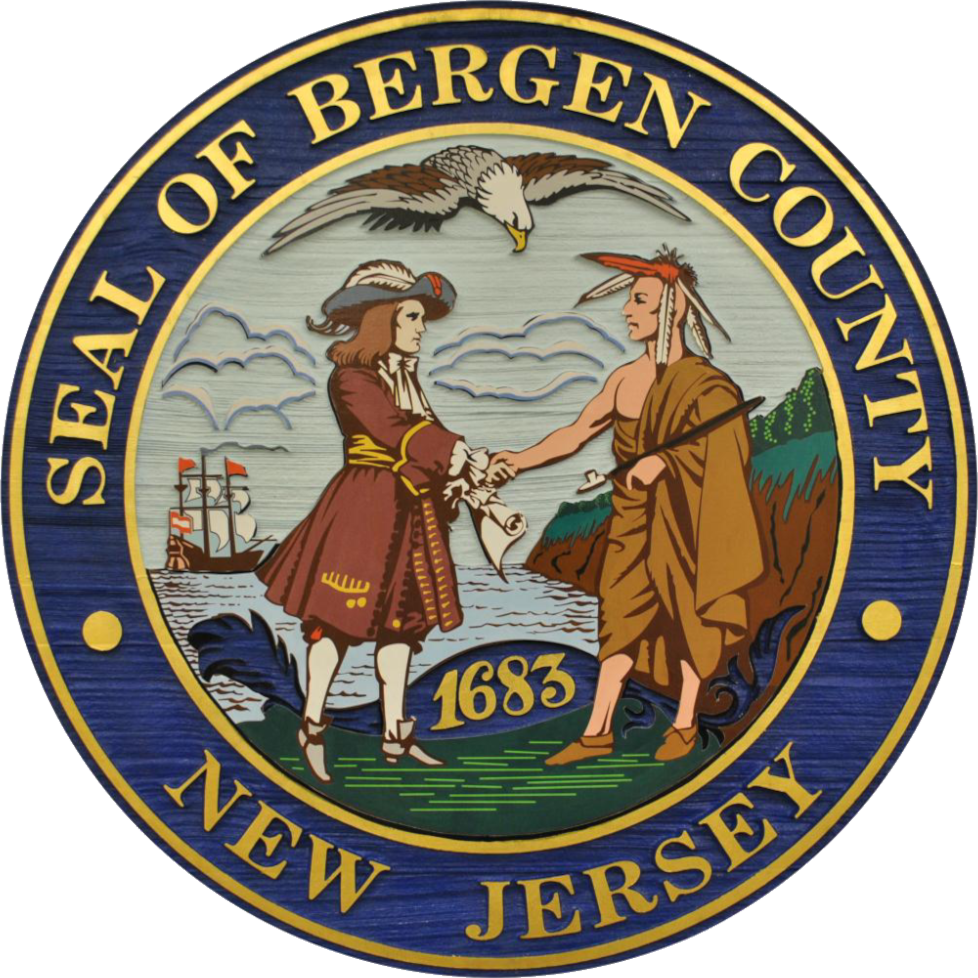
- Flag Seal Logo

- Location within the U.S. state of New Jersey
- Interactive map of Bergen County, New Jersey
- Coordinates: 40.96°N 74.07°W
- Country: United States
- State: New Jersey
- Founded: 1683
- Named for: Bergen, Norway or Bergen op Zoom, Netherlands
- Seat: Hackensack
- Largest municipality: Hackensack (population); Mahwah (area)

Government
  - County executive: James J. Tedesco III (D, term ends December 31, 2026)

Area
  - Total: 246.45 sq mi (638.3 km^{2})
  - Land: 232.79 sq mi (602.9 km^{2})
  - Water: 13.66 sq mi (35.4 km^{2}) 5.5%

Population (2020)
  - Total: 955,732
  - Estimate (2025): 977,026 ▲
  - Density: 4,105.6/sq mi (1,585.2/km^{2})
- Demonym: Bergenite
- Time zone: UTC−5 (Eastern)
  - Summer (DST): UTC−4 (EDT)
- Congressional districts: 5th, 9th
- Website: bergencountynj.gov
- Range in altitude: Highest elevation: 1,152 ft (351 m) (Bald Mountain, in the Ramapo Mountains, in Mahwah). Lowest elevation: 0 ft (0 m) (sea level), at the Hudson River in Edgewater.

Bergen County is the most populous county in the U.S. state of New Jersey. Located in the Gateway Region at the northeastern corner of New Jersey, Bergen County and its many inner suburbs constitute a highly developed part of the New York City metropolitan area, bordering the Hudson River; the George Washington Bridge, which crosses the Hudson, connects Bergen County with Manhattan. The county is part of the North Jersey region of the state.

As of the 2020 United States census, the county's population was 955,732, its highest decennial count ever and an increase of 50,616 (+5.6%) from the 905,116 recorded at the 2010 census, which in turn reflected an increase of 20,998 (2.4%) from the 884,118 counted in the 2000 census. The United States Census Bureau's Population Estimates Program estimated a 2025 population of 977,026, an increase of 21,294 (+2.2%) from the 2020 decennial census.

The county is divided into 70 municipalities, the most of any county in New Jersey, made up of 56 boroughs, nine townships, three cities, and two villages. The county's most populous place, with 46,030 residents as of the 2020 census, is Hackensack, which is also its county seat. Mahwah covers the largest area of any municipality, at 26.19 square miles (67.8 km^{2}).

Bergen County is one of the largest commercial hubs in both New Jersey and the United States, generating over $6 billion in annual revenues from retailers in Paramus alone, despite blue laws keeping most stores in the county and especially Paramus itself (which has even stricter blue laws than the rest of the county) open only six days per week. The county is one of the wealthiest counties in the United States, with a median household income of $109,497 (compared to $89,703 in New Jersey and $69,021 nationwide) and a per capita income of $55,710 (vs. $46,691 in the state and $37,638 in the U.S.) as of the 2017–2021 American Community Survey. Bergen County has some of the highest home prices in the United States, with the median sale price approximately $900,000 as of 2025 and maximum prices in the tens of millions of dollars. The county's park system includes 21 parks covering more than 9,800 acres (4,000 ha).

== Etymology ==
The origin of the name of Bergen County is a matter of debate. It is believed that the county is named after one of the earliest settlements, Bergen, in modern-day Hudson County, New Jersey. Several sources also attribute the name to Bergen, Norway, while others attribute it to Bergen op Zoom in the Netherlands. Some sources say that the name is derived from one of the earliest settlers of New Amsterdam (now New York City), Hans Hansen Bergen, a native of Norway, who arrived in New Netherland in 1633.

== History ==
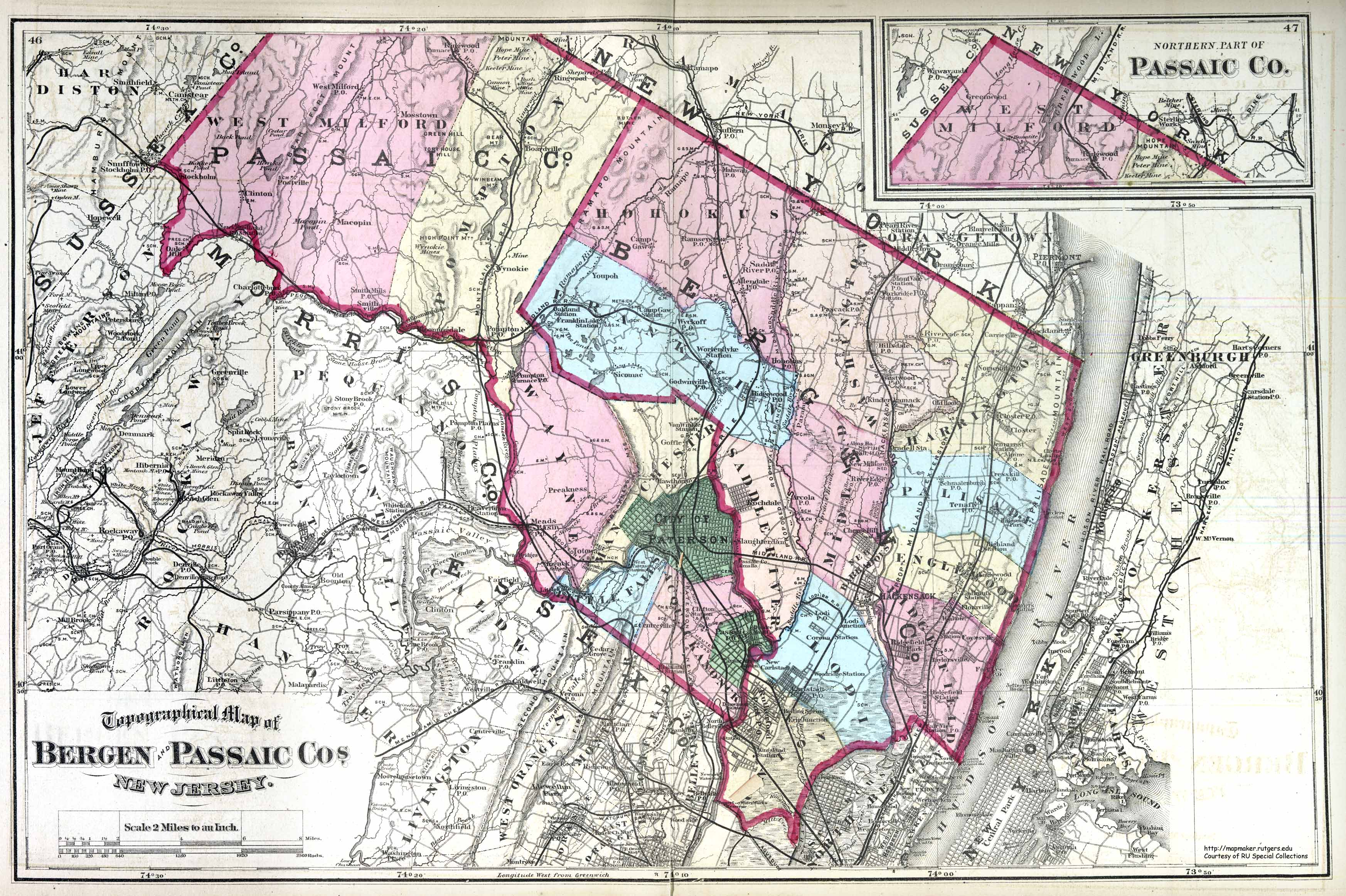
Bergen and Passaic counties, 1872

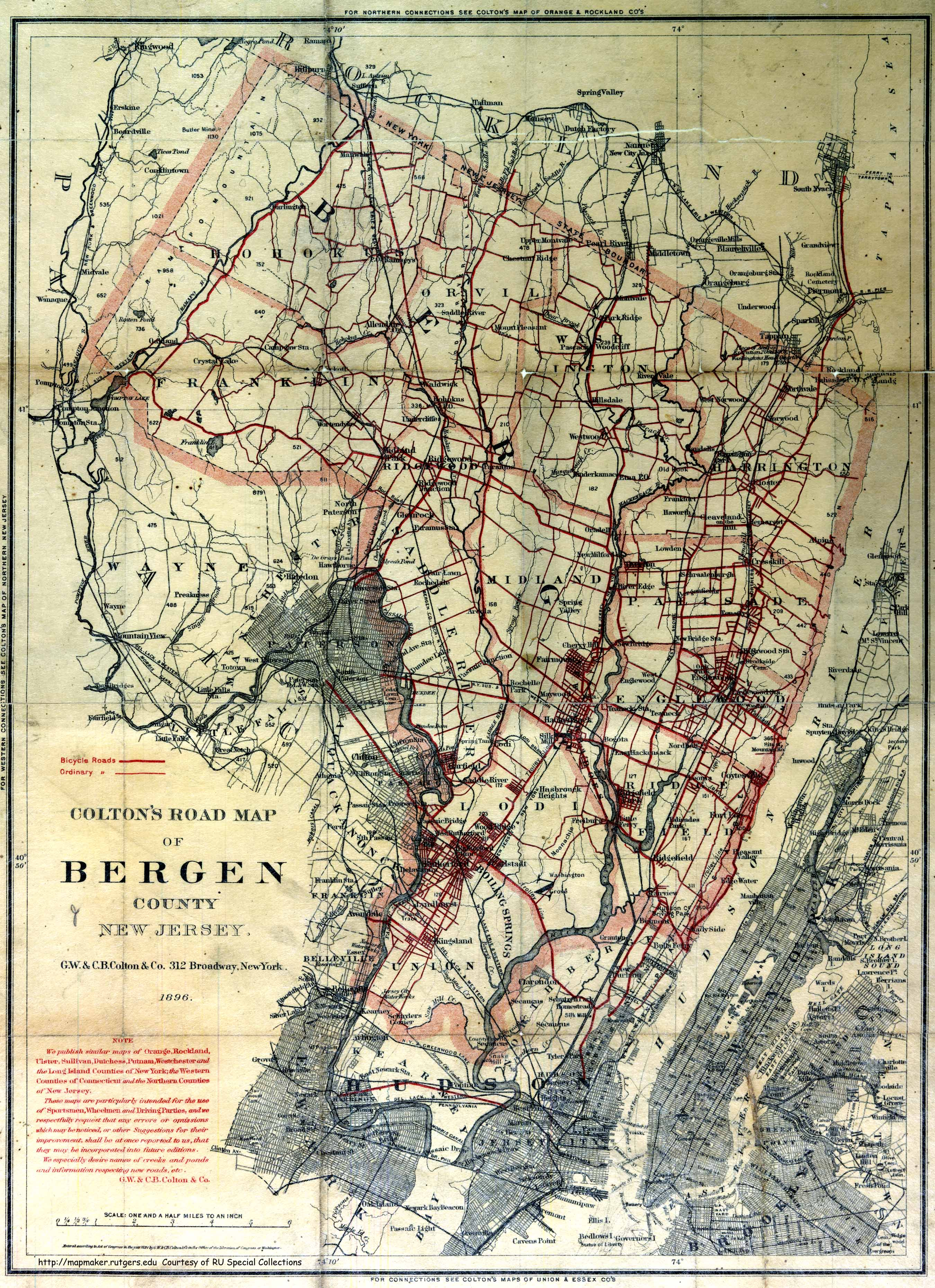
Bergen County, 1896

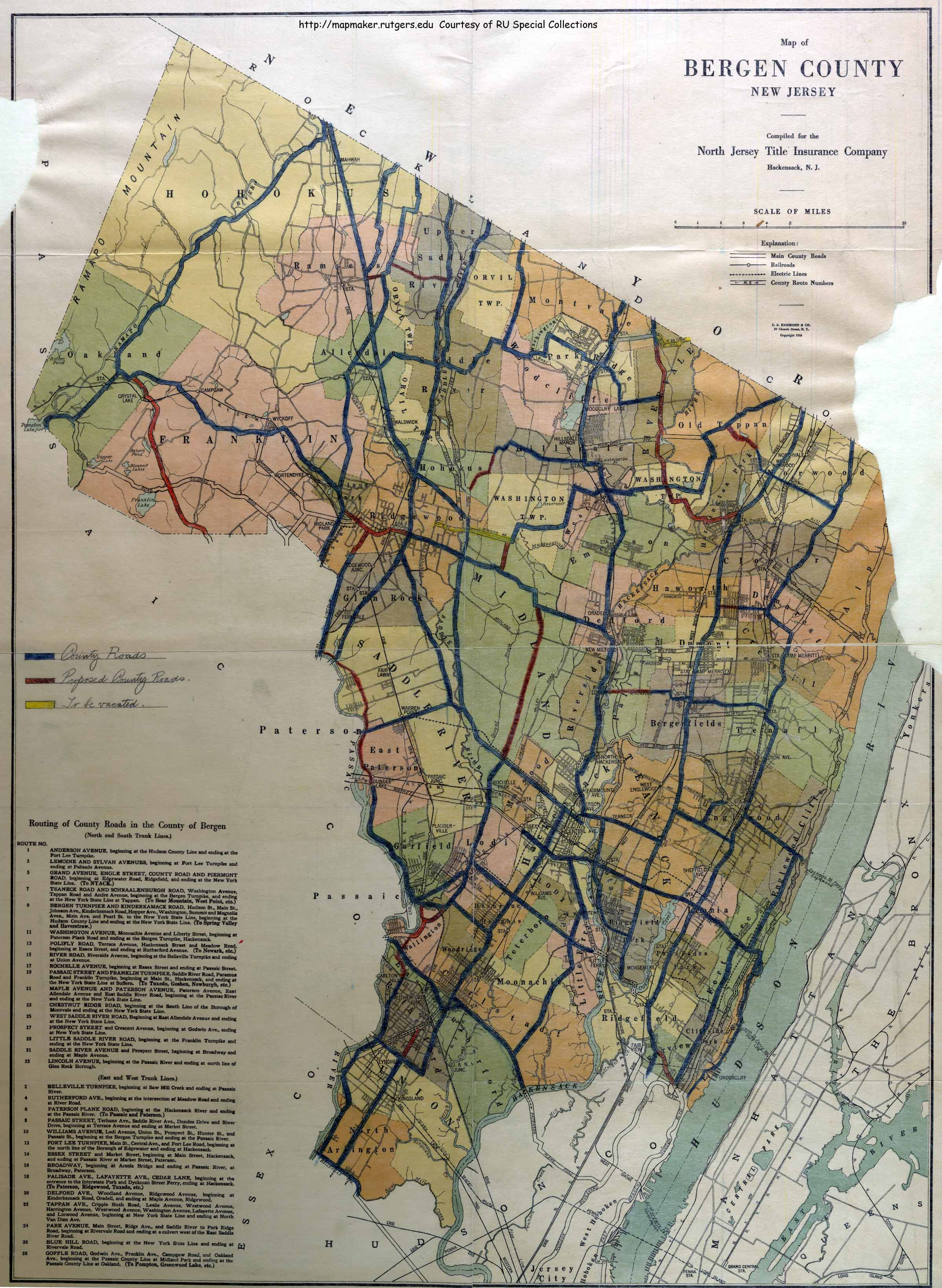
Bergen County, 1918

At the time of first European contact, Bergen County was inhabited by Native American people, particularly the Lenape Nation, whose subgroups included the Tappan, Hackensack, and Rumachenanck (later called the Haverstraw), as named by the Dutch colonists. Some of their descendants are included among the Ramapough Mountain Indians, recognized as a tribe by the state in 1980. Their ancestors had moved into the mountains to escape encroachment by Dutch and English colonists. Their descendants reside mostly in the northwest of the county, in nearby Passaic County and in Rockland County, New York, tracing their Lenape ancestry to speakers of the Munsee language, one of three major dialects of their language. Over the years, they absorbed other ethnicities by intermarriage.

In the 17th century, the Dutch considered the area comprising today's Bergen and Hudson counties as part of New Netherland, their colonial province of the Dutch Republic. The Dutch claimed it after Henry Hudson (sailing for the Dutch East India Company) explored Newark Bay and anchored his ship at Weehawken Cove in 1609. From an early date, the Dutch began to import African slaves to fill their labor needs. Bergen County eventually was the largest slaveholding county in the state, with nearly 20% of its population consisting of slaves in 1800. The African slaves were used for labor at the ports to support shipping, as well as for domestic servants, trades, and farm labor.

Early settlement attempts by the Dutch colonists included Pavonia (1633), Vriessendael (1640), and Achter Col (1642), but the Native Americans repelled these settlements in Kieft's War (1643–1645) and the Peach War (1655). European settlers returned to the western shores of the Hudson River in the 1660 formation of Bergen Township (now part of Jersey City, New Jersey), which would become one of the earliest permanent European settlements in present-day New Jersey.

During the Second Anglo-Dutch War, on August 27, 1664, New Amsterdam's governor Peter Stuyvesant surrendered to the English Navy. The English organized the Province of New Jersey in 1665, later splitting the territory into East Jersey and West Jersey in 1674. On November 30, 1675, the settlement Bergen and surrounding plantations and settlements were called Bergen County in an act passed by the province's General Assembly. In 1683, Bergen (along with the three other original counties of East Jersey) was officially recognized as an independent county by the Provincial Assembly.

Initially, Bergen County comprised only the land between the Hudson River and the Hackensack River, extending north to the border between East Jersey and New York. In January 1709, the boundaries were extended to include all of the current territory of Hudson County (formed in 1840) and portions of the current territory of Passaic County (formed in 1837). The 1709 borders were described as follows:

"Beginning at Constable's Hook, so along the bay and Hudson's River to the partition point between New Jersey and the province of New York; along this line and the line between East and West Jersey^{†} to the Pequaneck River; down the Pequaneck and Passaic Rivers to the sound; and so following the sound to Constable's Hook the place of beginning."

† The line between East and West Jersey here referred to is not the line finally adopted and known as the Lawrence line, which was run by John Lawrence in September and October 1743. It was the compromise line agreed upon between Governors Daniel Coxe and Robert Barclay in 1682, which ran a little north of Morristown to the Passaic River; thence up the Pequaneck to forty-one degrees of north latitude; and thence by a straight line due east to the New York State line. This line being afterward objected to by the East Jersey proprietors, the latter procured the running of the Lawrence line.

Bergen was the location of several battles and troop movements during the American Revolutionary War. Fort Lee's location on the bluffs of the New Jersey Palisades, opposite Fort Washington in Manhattan, made it a strategic position during the war. In November 1776, the Battle of Fort Lee took place as part of a British plan to capture George Washington and to resoundingly defeat the Continental Army, whose forces were divided and located in Fort Lee and Hackensack. After abandoning the defenses in Fort Lee and leaving behind considerable supplies, the Continental forces staged a hasty retreat through present-day Englewood, Teaneck, and Bergenfield, and across the Hackensack River at New Bridge Landing, one of the few sites where the river was crossed by a bridge. They destroyed the bridge to delay the British assault on Washington's headquarters in the village of Hackensack. The next day, George Washington retreated to Newark and left Hackensack via Polifly Road. British forces pursued, and Washington continued to retreat across New Jersey. The retreat allowed American forces to escape capture and regroup for subsequent successes against the British elsewhere in New Jersey later that winter.

Soon after the Battle of Princeton in January 1777, British forces realized that they were not able to spread themselves thin across New Jersey. Local militia retook Hackensack and the rest of Bergen County. Bergen County saw skirmishes throughout the war as armies from both sides maneuvered across the countryside.

The Baylor Massacre took place in 1778 in River Vale, resulting in severe losses for the Continentals.

In 1837, Passaic County was formed from parts of Bergen and Essex counties. In 1840, Hudson County was formed from Bergen. These two divisions took roughly 13,000 residents (nearly half of the previous population) from the county's rolls.

In 1852, the Erie Railroad began operating major rail services from Jersey City on the Hudson River to points north and west via leased right-of-way in the county. This became known as the Erie Main Line, and is still in use for passenger service today. The Erie later leased two other railroads built in the 1850s and 1860s, later known as the Pascack Valley Line and the Northern Branch, and in 1881 built a cutoff, now the Bergen County Line. There were two other rail lines in the county, ultimately known as the West Shore Railroad and the New York, Susquehanna, and Western.

In 1894, state law was changed to allow easy formation of municipalities with the borough form of government. This led to the "boroughitis" phenomenon, in which many new municipalities were created in a span of a few years. There were 26 boroughs that were formed in the county in 1894 alone, with two more boroughs (and one new township) formed in 1895. Ultimately 56 boroughs were incorporated in Bergen County, the highest number for any county in New Jersey.

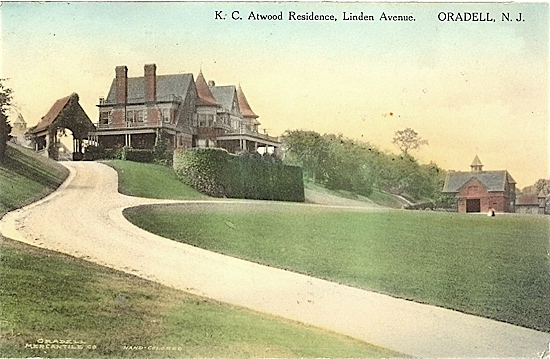
The Atwood-Blauvelt Mansion in Oradell, c. 1909

On January 11, 1917, the Kingsland explosion took place at a munitions factory in what is today Lyndhurst. The explosion is believed to have been an act of sabotage by German agents, as the munitions in question were destined for Russia, part of the U.S.'s effort to supply allies before entrance into World War I. After the U.S. entry into the war in April 1917, Camp Merritt was created in eastern Bergen County for troop staging. Beginning operations in August 1917, it housed 50,000 soldiers at a time, staging them for deployment to Europe via Hoboken. Camp Merritt was decommissioned in November 1919.

The George Washington Bridge was completed in 1931, linking Fort Lee to Manhattan. This connection spurred rapid development in the post-World War II era, developing much of the county to suburban levels. Two lanes were added to the upper level in 1946 and a second deck of traffic on the bridge was completed in 1962, expanding its capacity to becoming the world's only 14-lane suspension bridge. The bridge is the world's busiest motor vehicle bridge, carrying 104 million vehicles in 2019.

In 1955, the United States Army established a Nike Missile station at Campgaw Mountain (in the west of the county) for the defense of the New York Metropolitan Area from strategic bombers. In 1959, the site was upgraded to house Nike-Hercules Missiles with increased range, speed, and payload characteristics. The missile site closed in June 1971.

== Geography ==
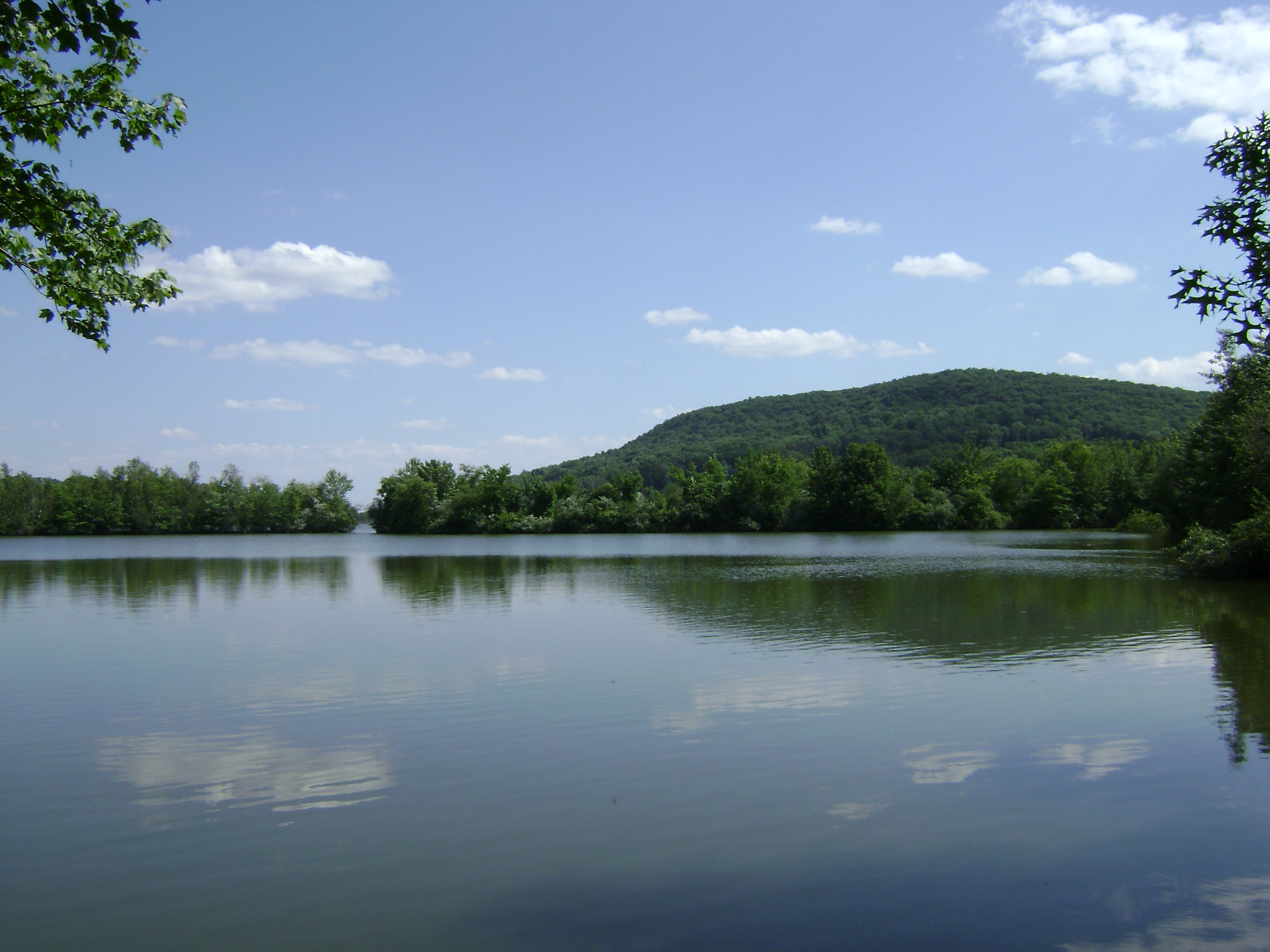
Franklin Lakes Nature Preserve

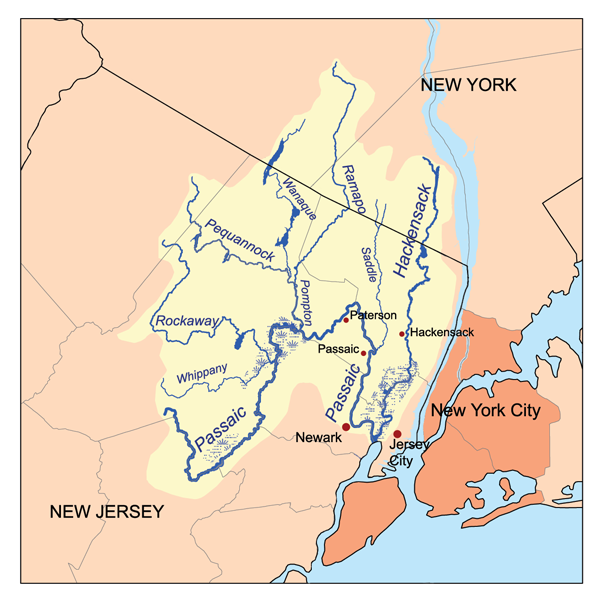
The Hackensack River and Passaic River watersheds.

Bergen County is located at the northeastern corner of the state of New Jersey and is bordered by Rockland County, New York, to the north; by Manhattan and the Bronx in New York City, as well as by Westchester County, New York, across the Hudson River to the east; and within New Jersey, by Hudson County as well as a small border with Essex County to the south, and by Passaic County to the west.

According to the U.S. Census Bureau, as of the 2020 Census, the county had a total area of 246.45 square miles (638.3 km^{2}), of which 232.79 square miles (602.9 km^{2}) was land (94.5%) and 13.66 square miles (35.4 km^{2}) was water (5.5%).

Bergen County's highest elevation is Bald Mountain near the New York state line in Mahwah, at 1,164 feet (355 m) above sea level. The county's lowest point is sea level, along the Hudson River, which in this region is a tidal estuary.

The sharp cliffs of the New Jersey Palisades lift much of the eastern boundary of the county up from the Hudson River. The relief becomes less pronounced across the middle section of the county, much of it being located in the Hackensack River valley or the Pascack Valley. In the northwestern portion of the county, Bergen County becomes hilly again and shares the Ramapo Mountains with Rockland County, New York.

The damming of the Hackensack River and a tributary, the Pascack Brook, produced three reservoirs in the county, Woodcliff Lake Reservoir (which impounds one billion gallons of water), Lake Tappan (3.5 billion gallons), and Oradell Reservoir, which allows United Water to provide drinking water to 750,000 residents of North Jersey, mostly in Bergen and Hudson counties. The Hackensack River drains the eastern portion of the county through the New Jersey Meadowlands, a wetlands area in the southern portion of the county. The central portion is drained by the Saddle River and the western portion is drained by the Ramapo River. Both of these are tributaries of the Passaic River, which forms a section of the southwestern border of the county.

=== Climate ===
Hackensack, New Jersey

Climate chart (precipitation, max. and min. temperature)
J	F	M	A	M	J	J	A	S	O	N	D
3.7 38 19	3.2 41 22	4.4 50 30	4.5 62 40	4.2 72 50	4.4 81 60	4.6 86 65	4.4 84 63	4.3 76 55	4.4 64 42	4 54 34	4 43 25
- █ Average max. and min. temperatures in °F
- █ Precipitation totals in inches
- Source: The Weather Channel
Metric conversion
J	F	M	A	M	J	J	A	S	O	N	D
93 3 −7	82 5 −6	111 10 −1	114 17 4	106 22 10	112 27 16	117 30 18	113 29 17	109 24 13	112 18 6	102 12 1	102 6 −4
- █ Average max. and min. temperatures in °C
- █ Precipitation totals in mm

Southeastern Bergen County lies at the edge of the humid subtropical climate zone (Cfa) according to the Köppen climate classification because its coldest month (January) averages above 26.6 °F (−3.0 °C). In part due to Bergen's coastal location, its lower elevation, and the partial shielding of the county from colder air by the three ridges of the Watchung Mountains as well as by the higher Appalachians, the climate of Bergen County is milder than in New Jersey counties further inland such as Sussex County. Bergen County has a moderately sunny climate, averaging between 2,400 and 2,800 hours of sunshine annually.

In recent years, average temperatures in the county seat of Hackensack have ranged from a low of 19 °F (−7 °C) in January to a high of 86 °F (30 °C) in July, although a record low of −15 °F (−26 °C) was recorded in February 1934 and a record high of 106 °F (41 °C) was recorded in July 1936. Average monthly precipitation ranged from 3.21 inches (82 mm) in February to 4.60 inches (117 mm) in July.

Average monthly temperatures in Mahwah (measured at the interchange of Route 17 and MacArthur Boulevard) range from 28.5 °F (−1.9 °C) in January to 73.8 °F (23.2 °C) in July. Using the 32 °F (0 °C) January isotherm, most of Bergen has a hot-summer humid continental climate (Dfa) except for higher areas in the Ramapo Mountains, which are Dfb, and along the Hudson River from Fort Lee and southward, where Cfa exists.

== Demographics ==
The county hosts one of the largest population of Circassian Americans.

Historical population
Census	Pop.	Note	%±
1790	12,601		—
1800	15,156		20.3%
1810	16,603		9.5%
1820	18,178		9.5%
1830	22,412		23.3%
1840	13,223	*	−41.0%
1850	14,725		11.4%
1860	21,618		46.8%
1870	30,122		39.3%
1880	36,786		22.1%
1890	47,226		28.4%
1900	78,441		66.1%
1910	138,002		75.9%
1920	210,703		52.7%
1930	364,977		73.2%
1940	409,646		12.2%
1950	539,139		31.6%
1960	780,255		44.7%
1970	897,148		15.0%
1980	845,385		−5.8%
1990	825,380		−2.4%
2000	884,118		7.1%
2010	905,116		2.4%
2020	955,732		5.6%
2025 (est.)	977,026		2.2%
Historical sources: 1790–1990 1970–2010 2020 * = Territorial change in previous decade

=== 2020 census ===
As of the 2020 United States census, the county had 955,732 people, 350,664 households, and 242,272 families. The population density was 3,900 inhabitants per square mile (1,505.8/km^{2}). There were 367,383 housing units at an average density of 1,576 per square mile (608.5/km^{2}). Among the housing units, 4.6% were vacant, 63.1% of occupied units were owner-occupied, and 36.9% were renter-occupied, with a homeowner vacancy rate of 1.2% and a rental vacancy rate of 4.5%. About 99.9% of residents lived in urban areas, while 0.1% lived in rural areas.

The county racial makeup was 56.9% White, 5.7% Black or African American, 0.5% American Indian and Alaska Native, 16.6% Asian, 0.0% Native Hawaiian and Pacific Islander, 10.1% from some other race, and 10.2% from two or more races. Hispanic or Latino residents of any race comprised 21.4% of the population.

There were 350,664 households, of which 32.5% had children under the age of 18 living with them, 57.1% were married couples living together, 25.9% had a female householder with no spouse or partner present, 13.9% had a male householder with no wife present, and 29.5% were non-families. About 24.1% of all households were made up of individuals, and 11.1% had someone living alone who was 65 years of age or older. The average household size was 3.18 and the average family size was 3.25.

The median age was 42.0 years. About 21.0% of the county's population was under age 18, 8.0% was from age 18 to 24, 36.7% was from age 25 to 44, and 17.7% was age 65 or older. For every 100 females there were 93.4 males, and for every 100 females age 18 and over there were 90.6 males age 18 and over.

The median household income was $108,827, and the median family income was $122,981. About 5.6% of the population were below the poverty line, including 7.4% of those under age 18 and 7.7% of those age 65 or over.

The most reported ancestries were Italian (15.8%), Irish (12.2%), German (8.7%), Korean (6.9%), Polish (5.3%), and English (4.9%).

=== Racial and ethnic composition ===
Bergen County, New Jersey – Racial and ethnic composition Note: the US Census treats Hispanic/Latino as an ethnic category. This table excludes Latinos from the racial categories and assigns them to a separate category. Hispanics/Latinos may be of any race.
Race / Ethnicity (NH = Non-Hispanic)	Pop 1980	Pop 1990	Pop 2000	Pop 2010	Pop 2020	% 1980	% 1990	% 2000	% 2010	% 2020
White alone (NH)	761,493	682,210	638,953	566,053	511,919	90.08%	82.65%	72.27%	62.54%	53.56%
Black or African American alone (NH)	32,282	38,037	44,149	46,850	49,909	3.82%	4.61%	4.99%	5.18%	5.22%
Native American or Alaska Native alone (NH)	706	936	824	869	811	0.08%	0.11%	0.09%	0.10%	0.08%
Asian alone (NH)	19,723	53,776	93,979	130,491	157,500	2.33%	6.52%	10.63%	14.42%	16.48%
Native Hawaiian or Pacific Islander alone (NH)	x	x	137	173	130	x	x	0.02%	0.02%	0.01%
Other race alone (NH)	2,667	645	1,659	2,568	6,464	0.32%	0.08%	0.19%	0.28%	0.68%
Mixed race or Multiracial (NH)	x	x	13,040	12,831	24,316	x	x	1.47%	1.42%	2.54%
Hispanic or Latino (any race)	28,514	49,776	91,377	145,281	204,683	3.37%	6.03%	10.34%	16.05%	21.42%
Total	845,385	825,380	884,118	905,116	955,732	100.00%	100.00%	100.00%	100.00%	100.00%

=== 2010 census ===
The 2010 United States census counted 905,116 people, 335,730 households, and 238,704 families in the county. The population density was 3,884.5 per square mile (1,499.8/km^{2}). There were 352,388 housing units at an average density of 1,512.3 per square mile (583.9/km^{2}). The racial makeup was 71.89% (650,703) White, 5.80% (52,473) Black or African American, 0.23% (2,061) Native American, 14.51% (131,329) Asian, 0.03% (229) Pacific Islander, 5.04% (45,611) from other races, and 2.51% (22,710) from two or more races. Hispanic or Latino residents of any race were 16.05% (145,281) of the population.

Of the 335,730 households, 32% had children under the age of 18; 56.1% were married couples living together; 10.9% had a female householder with no husband present and 28.9% were non-families. Of all households, 24.6% were made up of individuals and 10.5% had someone living alone who was 65 years of age or older. The average household size was 2.66 and the average family size was 3.2.

22.6% of the population was under the age of 18, 7.4% was from 18 to 24, 25.9% from 25 to 44, 29% from 45 to 64, and 15.1% was 65 years of age or older. The median age was 41.1 years. For every 100 females, the population had 92.9 males. For every 100 females ages 18 and older there were 89.8 males.

=== Community diversity ===
Connected to Manhattan by the George Washington Bridge, Bergen County is a suburban region with a diverse population and a distinct cultural identity. Its population includes residents of various religions, nationalities, and ethnic backgrounds, along with diverse households and partnership arrangements. South Korea, Poland, and India are the three most common nations of birth for foreign-born Bergen County residents. The county hosts one of the largest population of Circassian Americans.

==== Italian American ====
Italian Americans have long had a significant presence in Bergen County; in fact, Italian is the most commonly identified first ancestry among Bergen residents (18.5%), with 168,974 Bergen residents were recorded as being of Italian heritage in the 2013 American Community Survey.

To this day, many residents of the Meadowlands communities in the county's south are of Italian descent, most notably in South Hackensack (36.3%), Lyndhurst (33.8%), Carlstadt (31.2%), Wood-Ridge (30.9%) and Hasbrouck Heights (30.8%). Saddle Brook (29.8%), Lodi (29.4%), Moonachie (28.5%), Garfield, Hackensack, and the southeastern Bergen towns were Italian American strongholds for decades, but their Italo-American demographics have diminished in recent years as more recent immigrants have taken their place. At the same time, the Italian American population has grown in many of the communities in the northern half of the county, including Franklin Lakes, Ramsey, Montvale, and Woodcliff Lake.

==== Latin American ====
The diverse Hispanic and Latin American population in Bergen is growing in many areas of the county but is especially concentrated in a handful of municipalities, including Fairview (37.1%), Hackensack (25.9%), Ridgefield Park (22.2%), Englewood (21.8%), Bogota (21.3%), Garfield (20.1%), Cliffside Park (18.2%), Lodi (18.0%), and Bergenfield (17.0%). Traditionally, many of the Latino residents were of Colombian and Cuban ancestry, although that has been changing in recent years. Englewood's Colombian community is the largest in Bergen County and among the top ten by percent of population in the United States (7.17%); Hackensack, Fairview, Bergenfield, Bogota, and Lodi also have notable populations. The Cuban population is largest in Fairview, Ridgefield Park, Ridgefield, and Bogota, although the Cuban community is much bigger in Hudson County to the south. Since 2000, an increasing number of immigrants from other countries (including Peru, Mexico, Guatemala, El Salvador, the Dominican Republic, Ecuador, and Chile) as well as from the U.S. territory of Puerto Rico have entered the county. The diverse backgrounds of the local Latino community are best exemplified in Fairview, where 10% of the overall population hails from Central America, 7% from South America, and 9% from other Latin American countries, mainly those in the Caribbean. The borough of Fairview has the highest percentage of people of Salvadoran and Salvadoran American ancestry in the county, 12.4%. Hackensack has the highest percentage of people of Ecuadorian and Ecuadorian American ancestry in the county, 10.01%, with a total of approximately 4,500 living within city limits. Overall, Bergen County's Latino population has demonstrated a robust increase recently, growing from 145,281 as of the 2010 census count to an estimated 165,442 as of 2013.

==== Western European American ====
Irish Americans and German Americans are the next largest individual ethnic groups in Bergen County, numbering 115,914 (12.7% of the county's total population) and 80,288 (8.8%) respectively in 2013. As is the case with Italian Americans, these two groups developed sizable enclaves long ago and are now well established in all areas of the county. In 2023, Waldwick (30.43%), Ho-Ho-Kus (26.72%), and Hillsdale (24.94%) were reported as having the highest percentages of Irish American residents in the county. The Council of Irish Associations of Greater Bergen County, based in Bergenfield, has hosted an annual Saint Patrick's Day parade in the county since 1982.

==== Jewish American ====
Bergen County is home to the largest Jewish population in New Jersey. Many municipalities in the county are home to a significant number of Jewish Americans, including Fair Lawn, Teaneck, Tenafly, Closter, Englewood, Englewood Cliffs, Fort Lee, Bergenfield, Woodcliff Lake, Paramus, and Franklin Lakes. Teaneck, Fair Lawn, Englewood, and Bergenfield in particular have become havens for Bergen County's growing Orthodox Jewish communities, with a rising number of synagogues as well as supermarkets and restaurants offering kosher foods. The largest Israeli American communities in Bergen County were in Fair Lawn (2.5%), Closter (1.4%), and Tenafly (1.3%) in 2000, representing three of the four largest in the state. Altogether, 83,700 Bergen residents identified themselves as being of Jewish heritage in 2000, a number expected to show an increase per a 2014 survey of Jews in the county. The Jewish Federation of Northern New Jersey is based in Paramus.

==== Korean American ====
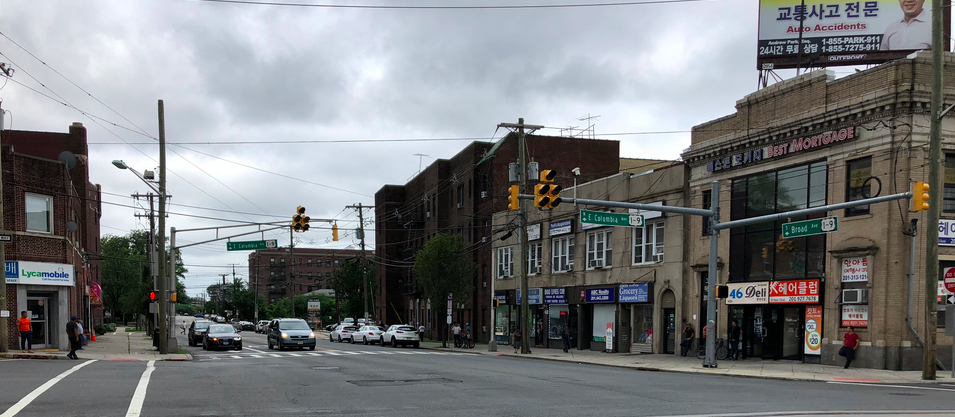
Broad Avenue in Koreatown, Palisades Park

South Koreans constituted the most prevalent foreign-born nationality in Bergen County, which was home to all of the nation's top ten municipalities by percentage of Korean population in 2010.

The top ten municipalities in the United States as ranked by Korean American percentage of overall population in 2010 are illustrated in the following table. Palisades Park has Koreans that comprise the majority (53.7%) of the population in 2022:

Rank	Municipality	County	State	Percentage
1	Palisades Park	Bergen County	New Jersey	53.7%
2	Leonia	Bergen County	New Jersey	26.5%
3	Ridgefield	Bergen County	New Jersey	25.7%
4	Fort Lee	Bergen County	New Jersey	23.5%
5	Closter	Bergen County	New Jersey	21.2%
6	Englewood Cliffs	Bergen County	New Jersey	20.3%
7	Norwood	Bergen County	New Jersey	20.1%
8	Edgewater	Bergen County	New Jersey	19.6%
9	Cresskill	Bergen County	New Jersey	17.8%
10	Demarest	Bergen County	New Jersey	17.3%

One of the fastest-growing immigrant groups in Bergen County is the Korean American community, which is concentrated along the Hudson River – especially in the area near the George Washington Bridge – and represented more than half of the state's entire Korean population as of 2000. As of the 2022 American Community Survey, persons of Korean ancestry made up 6.5% of Bergen County's population, the highest percentage for any county in the United States; while the concentration of Koreans in Palisades Park, within Bergen County, is the highest density and percentage of any municipality in the United States, at 53.7% of the borough's population. Per the 2010 Census, Palisades Park was home to the highest total number (10,115) of individuals of Korean ancestry among all municipalities in the state, while neighboring Fort Lee had the second largest cluster (8,318), and fourth highest proportion (23.5%, trailing Leonia (26.5%) and Ridgefield (25.7%)). All of the nation's top ten municipalities by percentage of Korean population in 2010 were located in Bergen County, including Palisades Park, Leonia, Ridgefield, Fort Lee, Closter, Englewood Cliffs, Norwood, Edgewater, Cresskill, and Demarest, closely followed by Old Tappan. Virtually all of the municipalities with the highest Korean concentrations are located in the eastern third of the county, near the Hudson River, although Ridgewood has emerged as a Korean American nexus in western Bergen County, and Paramus and River Edge in central Bergen County. Beginning in 2012, county election ballots were printed in the Korean language, in addition to English and Spanish, given the U.S. Census Bureau's directive that Bergen County's Korean population had grown large enough to warrant language assistance during elections. Between 2011 and 2017, the Korean population of Fair Lawn was estimated to have more than doubled.

H Mart, the largest Korean supermarket chain outside Korea, is headquartered in Fort Lee.

South Korean chaebols have established North American headquarters operations in Bergen County, including Samsung, LG Corp, and Hanjin Shipping. H Mart, the largest Korean supermarket chain outside Korea, is headquartered in Fort Lee.

==== Polish American ====
Polish Americans are well represented in western Bergen County and are growing as a community, with 59,294 (6.5%) of residents of Polish descent residing in the county as of the 2013 American Community Survey. The community's cultural and commercial heart has long been centered in Wallington, where 45.5% of the population is of Polish descent; this is the largest concentration among New Jersey municipalities and the seventh-highest in the United States. The adjacent city of Garfield has also become a magnet for Polish immigrants, with 22.9% of the population identifying themselves as being of Polish ancestry, the third highest concentration in the state.

==== African American ====
The county's African American community is almost entirely concentrated in three municipalities: Englewood (10,215 residents, accounting for 38.98% of the city's total population), Teaneck (11,298; 28.78%), and Hackensack (10,518; 24.65%). Collectively, these three areas account for nearly 70% of the county's total African American population of 46,568, and in fact, blacks have had a presence in these towns since the earliest days of the county. In sharp contrast, African Americans comprise less than 2% of the total in most of Bergen's other municipalities. In Englewood, the African American population is concentrated in the Third and Fourth wards of the western half of the city, while the northeastern section of Teaneck has been an African American enclave for several decades. In 2014, Teaneck selected its first female African-American mayor. Hackensack's long-established African American community is primarily located in the central part of the city, especially in the area near Central Avenue and First Street. Bergen County's black population has declined from 52,473 counted in the 2010 Census to an estimated 50,478 in 2012. Other county municipalities with a sizeable minority of African Americans include Bergenfield (7.7%), Bogota (9.4%), Garfield (6.5%), Lodi (7.5%) and Ridgefield Park (6.4%).

==== Indian American ====
Indian Americans represent a rapidly growing demographic in Bergen County, enumerating over 40,000 individuals in 2013, a significant increase from the 24,973 counted in the 2010 Census, and represent the second largest Asian ethnic group in Bergen County, after Korean Americans. The biggest clusters of Indian Americans are located in Hackensack, Ridgewood, Fair Lawn, Paramus, Teaneck, Mahwah, Bergenfield, Lodi, and Elmwood Park. Within the county's Indian population is America's largest Malayali community, and Kerala-based Kitex Garments, India's largest children's clothing manufacturer, opened its first U.S. office in Montvale in October 2015. Glen Rock resident Gurbir Grewal, a member of Bergen County's growing Indian American Sikh community, was sworn into the position of county prosecutor in 2016, and an architecturally notable Sikh gurudwara resides in Glen Rock, while a similarly prominent Hindu mandir has been built in Mahwah. The public library in Fair Lawn began a highly attended Hindi language (हिन्दी) storytelling program in October 2013. The affluent municipalities of northern Bergen County are witnessing significant growth in their Indian American communities, including Glen Rock, into which up to 90% of this constituency was estimated by one member in 2014 to have moved within the preceding two-year period alone. In February 2015, the board of education of the Glen Rock Public Schools voted to designate the Hindu holy day Diwali as an annual school holiday, making it the first district in the county to close for the holiday, while thousands celebrated the first county-wide celebration of Diwali under a unified sponsorship banner in 2016. An annual "Holi in the Village" festival of colors has been launched in Ridgewood.

==== Russian (and other former Soviet) American ====
Fair Lawn, Tenafly, Alpine, and Fort Lee are hubs for Russian Americans, including a growing community of Russian Jews. Garfield is home to an architecturally prominent Russian Orthodox church. Likewise, Ukrainian Americans, Georgian Americans, and Uzbek Americans have more recently followed the path of their Russian American predecessors to Bergen County, particularly to Fair Lawn. The size of Fair Lawn's Russian American presence has prompted an April Fool's satire titled, "Putin Moves Against Fair Lawn". The Armenian American population in Bergen is dispersed throughout the county, but its most significant concentration is in the southeastern towns near the George Washington Bridge. The victims of the Armenian genocide are recognized annually at the Bergen County Courthouse in Hackensack.

==== Filipino American ====
Bergenfield, along with Paramus, Hackensack, New Milford, Dumont, Fair Lawn, and Teaneck, have become growing hubs for Filipino Americans. Taken as a whole, these municipalities are home to a significant proportion of Bergen County's Philippine population. A census-estimated 20,859 Filipino Americans resided in Bergen County as of 2013, embodying an increase from the 19,155 counted in 2010. Between 2000 and 2010, the Filipino-American population of Bergenfield grew from 11.7%, or 3,081 residents, to 17.1%, or 4,569, and increasing further to 5,062 (18.4%) by 2016. Bergenfield is informally known as the Little Manila of Bergen County, with a significant concentration of Filipino residents and businesses. In the late 1990s, Bergenfield became the first municipality on the East Coast of the United States to elect a Filipino mayor, Robert C. Rivas. The annual Filipino American Festival is held in Bergenfield. The Philippine-American Community of Bergen County (PACBC) organization is based in Paramus, while other Filipino organizations are based in Fair Lawn and Bergenfield. Bergen County's culturally active Filipino community repatriated significant financial assistance to victims of Typhoon Haiyan, which ravaged the Philippines in November 2013. Between 2011 and 2017, Fair Lawn's Filipino population was estimated to have more than doubled. In 2021, the multinational conglomerate Jollibee restaurant chain based in Metro Manila, planned to open its first Bergen County location in East Rutherford.

==== Chinese American ====
The Chinese American population is also spread out, with sizable populations in Fort Lee, Paramus, Ridgewood, River Edge, and Englewood Cliffs. Fort Lee and Paramus have the highest total number of Chinese among Bergen municipalities, while Englewood Cliffs has the highest percentage (8.42%). Several school districts throughout the county have added Mandarin to their curricula.

==== Japanese American ====
The Japanese community, which includes a significant number of Japanese nationals, has long had a presence in Fort Lee, with over a quarter of the county's total Japanese population living in that borough alone. Adjacent Edgewater has also developed an active Japanese American community, particularly after the construction of the largest Japanese-oriented commercial center on the U.S. East Coast in this borough. As of March 2011, about 2,500 Japanese Americans lived in Fort Lee and Edgewater combined; this is the largest concentration of Japanese Americans in New Jersey. The remainder of Bergen County's Japanese residents are concentrated in northern communities, including Ridgewood. The Japanese-American Society of New Jersey is based in Fort Lee.

==== Balkan American ====
Greek Americans have had a fairly sizable presence in Bergen for several decades, and according to 2000 census data, the Greek community numbered 13,247 county-wide. Greek restaurants are abundant in Bergen County. The largest concentrations of Greeks by percentage in the county are in Englewood Cliffs (7.2%), Alpine (5.2%), Fort Lee (3.7%), and Palisades Park (3.5%). Macedonian Americans and Albanian Americans have arrived relatively recently in New Jersey but have quickly established Bergen County enclaves, roughly in tandem, in Garfield, Elmwood Park, and Fair Lawn.

==== Iranian American ====
A relatively recent community of Iranian Americans has emerged in Bergen County, including those in professional occupations scattered throughout the county.

==== Same-sex couples ====
Same-sex couples headed one in 160 households in 2010, prior to the commencement of same-sex marriages in New Jersey on October 21, 2013. On June 28, 2016, Bergen County officials for the first time raised the rainbow-colored gay pride flag at the county administration building in Hackensack to commemorate the gay rights movement.

==== Muslims ====
Bergen County also has a moderate-sized Muslim population, which numbered 6,473 as of the 2000 census. Teaneck and Hackensack have emerged as the two most significant Muslim enclaves in the county, with the American Muslim Union's 18th annual brunch gathering held in Teaneck in 2016. Bergen's Muslim population primarily consists of Arab Americans, South Asian Americans, African Americans, and more recently, Macedonian Americans and Albanian Americans, although many members of these groups practice other religions. While Arab Americans have not established a significant presence in any particular municipality, in total there are 11,755 county residents who indicated Arab ancestry in the 2000 census. The overwhelming majority of Bergen's Arab American population (64.3%) is constituted by persons of Lebanese (2,576), Syrian (2,568), and Egyptian (2,417) descent. The county's diners provide late-night and pre-dawn dining options during the Islamic holy month of Ramadan.

== Transportation ==
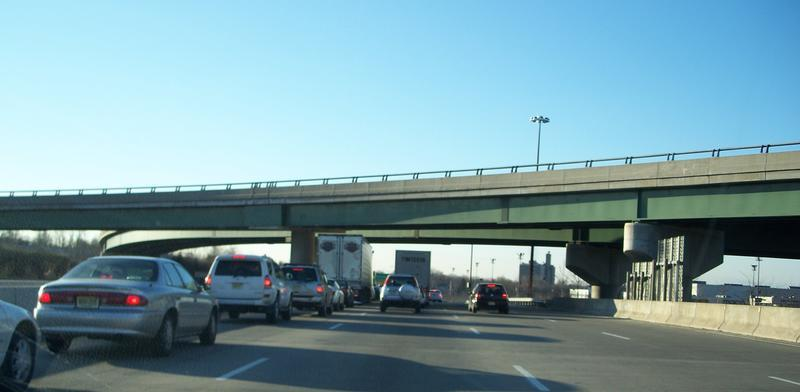
The traffic intersection of Route 17 and Route 4 in Paramus is one of the busiest in the world.

As of May 2010, the county had a total of 2,988.59 miles (4,809.67 km) of roadways, of which 2,402.78 miles (3,866.90 km) are maintained by the municipality, 438.97 miles (706.45 km) by Bergen County, 106.69 miles (171.70 km) by the New Jersey Department of Transportation, 11.03 miles (17.75 km) by the Palisades Interstate Parkway Commission, 27.94 miles (44.97 km) by the New Jersey Turnpike Authority and 1.18 miles (1.90 km) by the Port Authority of New York and New Jersey.

Bergen County has a highly developed road network, including the northern termini of the New Jersey Turnpike (a portion of Interstate 95) and the Garden State Parkway, the eastern terminus of Interstate 80, and a portion of Interstate 287. A notable feature of Bergen County road intersections is ubiquitous signage guiding drivers with the direction toward multiple municipalities.

Other roadways that serve Bergen County include:

U.S. highways

- U.S. Route 1/9
- U.S. Route 9W
- U.S. Route 46
- U.S. Route 202
- Interstate 95W (Western spur along I-95 / NJ Turnpike)

State highways

- 3
- 4
- 5
- 7 (Runs along the southern county border in North Arlington)
- 17
- 63
- 67
- 93
- 120
- 208

Other highways

- Palisades Interstate Parkway

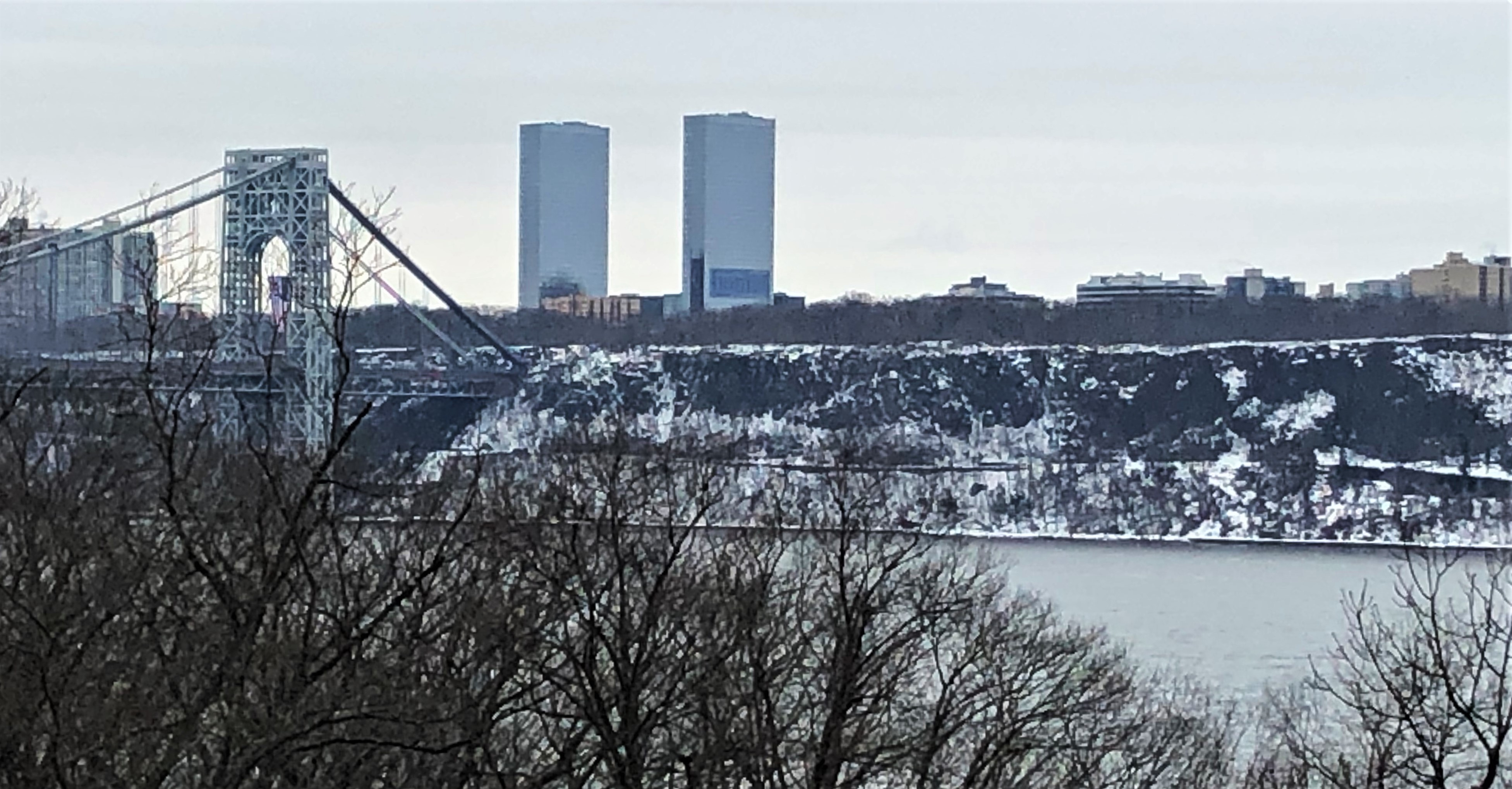
The George Washington Bridge, connecting Fort Lee (above) in Bergen County across the Hudson River to New York City, is the world's busiest motor vehicle bridge. The twin 47-story residential skyscrapers in the background atop the Hudson Palisades in winter are Bergen County's tallest as of 2023.

Bridges and Tunnels

The George Washington Bridge, connecting Fort Lee in Bergen County across the Hudson River to the Upper Manhattan section of New York City, is the world's busiest motor vehicle bridge. Access to New York City is alternatively available for motorists through the Lincoln Tunnel and Holland Tunnel in Hudson County. Access across the Hudson River to Westchester County in New York is available using the Tappan Zee Bridge in neighboring Rockland County, New York.

As of May 2010, the county had a total of 2,988.59 miles (4,809.67 km) of roadways, of which 2,402.78 miles (3,866.90 km) are maintained by the municipality, 438.97 miles (706.45 km) by Bergen County, 106.69 miles (171.70 km) by the New Jersey Department of Transportation, 11.03 miles (17.75 km) by the Palisades Interstate Parkway Commission, 27.94 miles (44.97 km) by the New Jersey Turnpike Authority and 1.18 miles (1.90 km) by the Port Authority of New York and New Jersey.

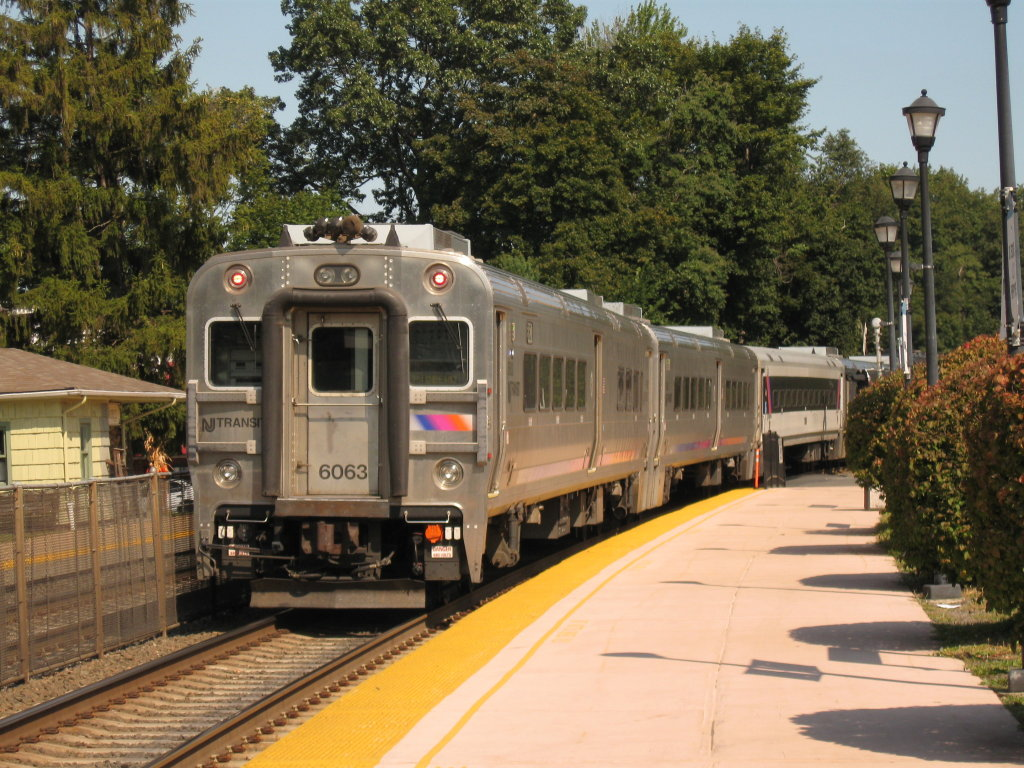
Glen Rock–Boro Hall station. Glen Rock is served by both the Bergen County Line (above) and the Main Line of the NJ Transit public transportation system.

Public Transportation

Train service is available on three lines from NJ Transit: the Bergen County Line, the Main Line, and the Pascack Valley Line. They run north–south to Hoboken Terminal with connections to the PATH train. NJ Transit also offers connecting service to New York Penn Station and Newark Penn Station at Secaucus Junction. Connections are also available at Hoboken Terminal to the Hudson-Bergen Light Rail and New York Waterways ferry service to the World Financial Center and other destinations. Despite the name, the Hudson-Bergen Light Rail does not yet run into Bergen County, although a northward extension from Hudson County to Englewood Hospital and Medical Center, known as the Northern Branch Corridor Project, has been advanced to the draft environmental impact statement stage by NJ Transit. The proposed Passaic-Bergen Rail Line, with two station stops in Hackensack, has not advanced since its 2008 announcement. The Access to the Region's Core rail tunnel project would have allowed many Bergen County railway commuters a one-seat ride into Manhattan but was canceled in October 2010.

Local and express bus service is available from NJ Transit and private companies such as Academy Bus Lines, and Coach USA, offering transport within Bergen County, elsewhere in New Jersey, and to the Port Authority Bus Terminal and George Washington Bridge Bus Station in New York City. In studies conducted to determine the best possible routes for the Bergen BRT (bus rapid transit) system, it has been determined the many malls and other "activity generators" in the vicinity of the intersection of routes 4 and 17 would constitute the core of any system. While no funding has for construction of the project has been identified, a study begun in 2012 will define the optimal routes.

Airports

There is one airport in the county, Teterboro Airport in Teterboro, which is operated by the Port Authority of New York and New Jersey. The three busiest commercial airports in the New York City metropolitan area, namely JFK International Airport, Newark Liberty International Airport, and LaGuardia Airport, are all located within 25 miles of Bergen County.

For the main surface-street routes through the county, see List of county routes in Bergen County, New Jersey.

== Education ==
=== Tertiary education ===
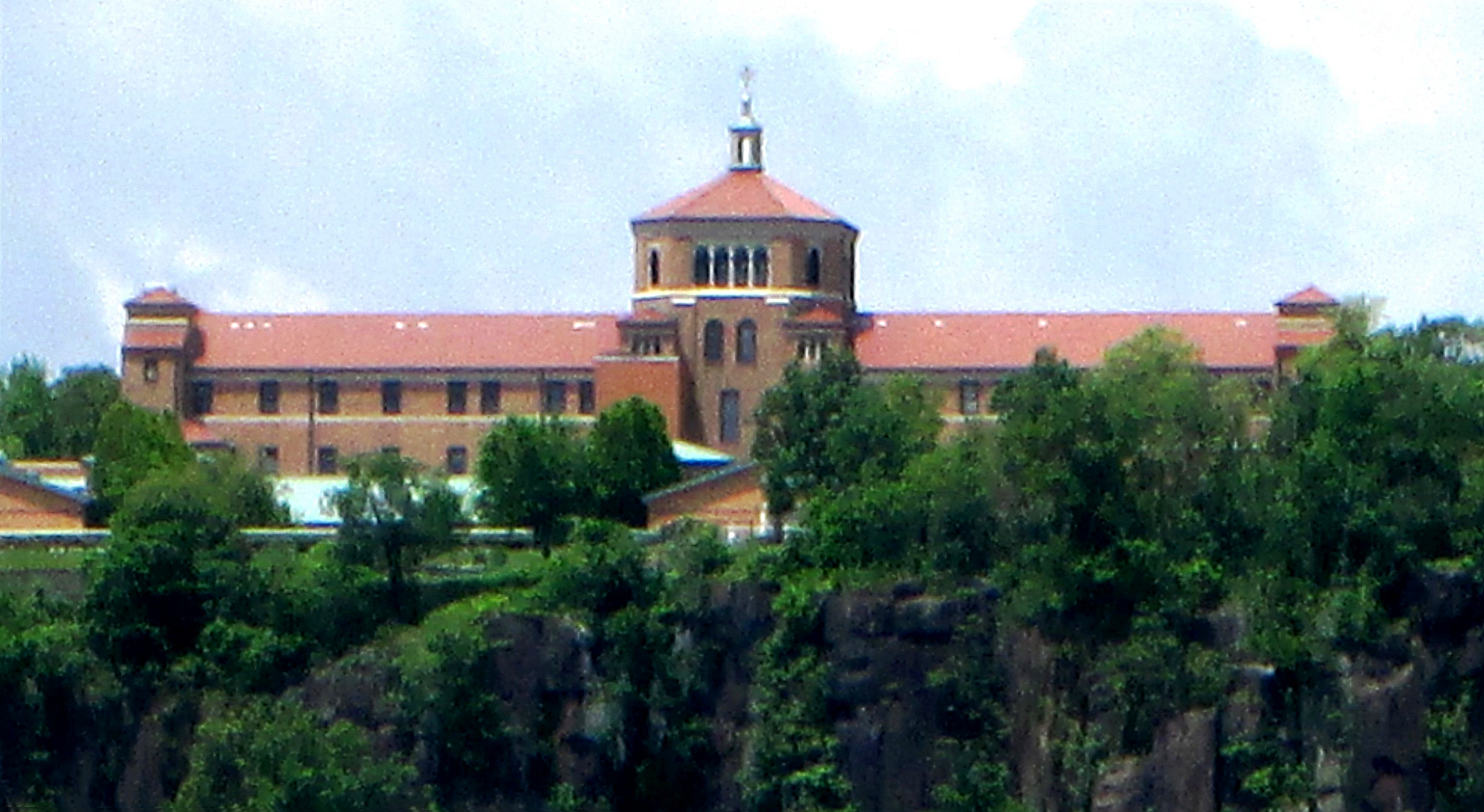
The former Englewood Cliffs campus of Saint Peter's University and Englewood Cliffs College, as seen from Manhattan

Bergen County is home to several colleges and universities:

- Bergen Community College – Paramus, with other centers in Hackensack and Lyndhurst
- Eastwick College – Ramsey and Hackensack
- Fairleigh Dickinson University – Teaneck and Hackensack
- Felician University – Lodi and Rutherford
- Ramapo College – Mahwah

Saint Peter's University formerly operated a campus in Englewood Cliffs. This campus, on the site of the former Englewood Cliffs College, was active from 1975 until its official closure in August 2018. Berkeley College formerly operated a campus in Paramus but announced the closure of this campus in spring 2022, thereafter consolidating it with the college's campus in Woodland Park (in Passaic County).

=== School districts ===
The county has the following school districts:

K-12

- Bergenfield Public School District
- Bogota Public Schools
- Cliffside Park School District
- Cresskill Public Schools
- Dumont Public Schools
- Elmwood Park Public Schools
- Emerson School District
- Englewood Public School District
- Fair Lawn Public Schools
- Fort Lee School District
- Garfield Public Schools
- Glen Rock Public Schools
- Hackensack Public Schools
- Hasbrouck Heights School District
- Leonia Public Schools
- Lodi Public Schools
- Lyndhurst School District
- Mahwah Township Public Schools
- Midland Park School District
- New Milford School District
- North Arlington School District
- Palisades Park Public School District
- Paramus Public Schools
- Park Ridge Public Schools
- Ramsey Public School District
- Ridgefield Park Public Schools
- Ridgefield School District
- Ridgewood Public Schools
- Rutherford School District
- Saddle Brook Public Schools
- Teaneck Public Schools
- Tenafly Public Schools
- Waldwick Public School District
- Wallington Public Schools
- Westwood Regional School District – Regional
- Wood-Ridge School District

Secondary (9-12, except as noted)

- Bergen County Technical Schools
- Carlstadt-East Rutherford Regional School District
- Northern Highlands Regional High School
- Northern Valley Regional High School District
- Pascack Valley Regional High School District
- Ramapo Indian Hills Regional High School District
- River Dell Regional School District – (7–12)

Elementary (K-8, except as noted)

- Allendale School District
- Alpine Public School District
- Carlstadt Public Schools
- Closter Public Schools
- Demarest Public Schools
- East Rutherford School District
- Edgewater Public Schools (K-6)
- Englewood Cliffs Public Schools
- Fairview Public Schools
- Franklin Lakes Public Schools
- Harrington Park School District
- Haworth Public Schools
- Hillsdale Public Schools
- Ho-Ho-Kus School District
- Little Ferry Public Schools
- Maywood Public Schools
- Montvale Public Schools
- Moonachie School District
- Northvale Public Schools
- Norwood Public School District
- Oakland Public Schools
- Old Tappan Public Schools
- Oradell Public School District (K–6)
- River Edge Elementary School District (K–6)
- River Vale Public Schools
- Rochelle Park School District
- Saddle River School District (K–5)
- South Hackensack School District
- Upper Saddle River School District
- Woodcliff Lake Public Schools
- Wyckoff School District

The Rockleigh Borough School District is a non-operating school district. Teterboro Borough School District was a non-operating school district; it is now in the Hasbrouck Heights district.

County-wide school districts include Bergen County Technical Schools and Bergen County Special Services School District. South Bergen Jointure Commission also has special education services for the south of the county.

Bergen has some 45 public high schools and at least 23 private high schools. Three of the top ten municipal high schools out of 339 schools in New Jersey were located in Bergen County, according to a 2014 ranking by New Jersey Monthly magazine, including Northern Highlands Regional High School in Allendale (#3), Pascack Hills High School in Montvale (#7), and Glen Rock High School in Glen Rock (#8). The magazine's list did not include the Bergen County Academies, which as the county's public magnet high school in Hackensack has continued to be recognized by various rankings as one of the best high schools in the United States. In 2014, BCA had an average HSPA score of 294 out of 300 and an average SAT score of 2103 out of 2400.

There is a school for Japanese citizen students, the New Jersey Japanese School, in Oakland, in the northwestern portion of Bergen County. In 1987, there were five juku (Japanese-style cram schools) in the county, with two of them in Fort Lee.

== Arts and culture ==
The Bergen Performing Arts Center (PAC) is based in Englewood, while numerous museums are located throughout the county. In September 2014, the Englewood-based Northern New Jersey Community Foundation announced an initiative known as ArtsBergen, a centralizing body with the goal of connecting artists and arts organizations with one another in Bergen County.

=== Educational and cultural ===
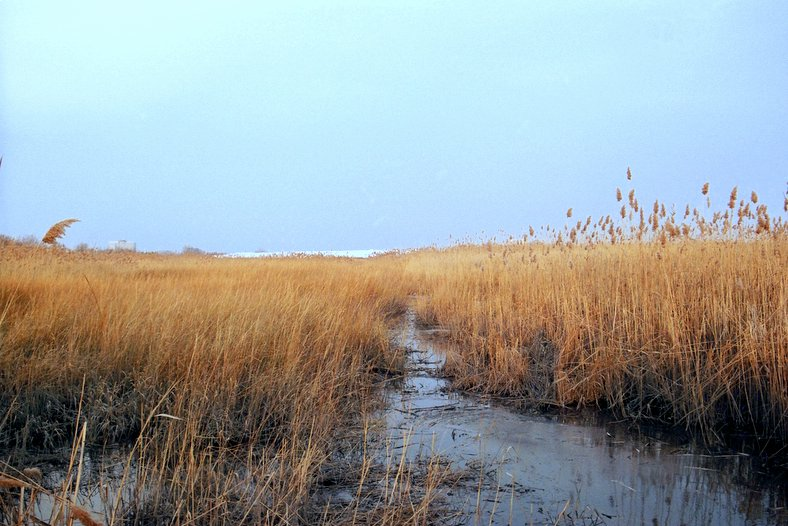
The New Jersey Meadowlands in Lyndhurst.

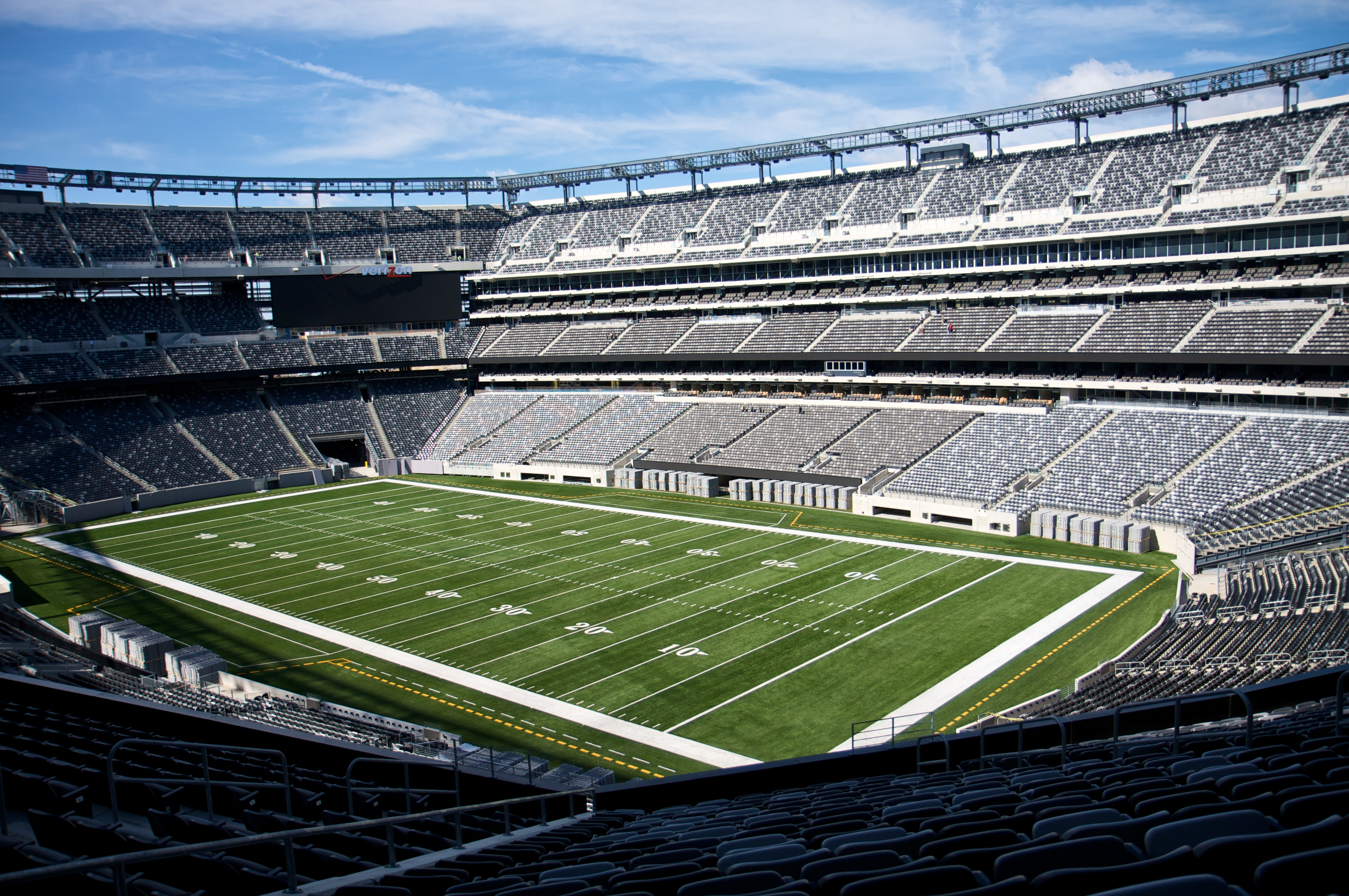
MetLife Stadium, in East Rutherford, was the most expensive stadium ever built, at approximately $1.6 billion.

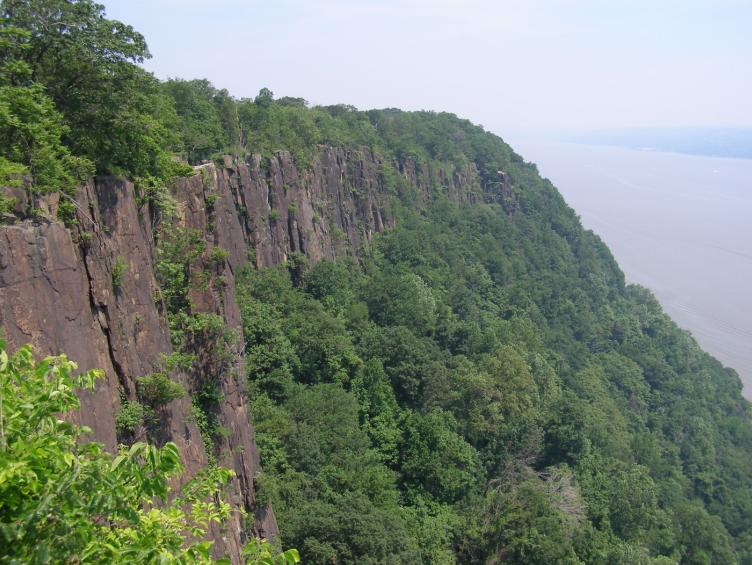
Northward view of the Hudson River from the cliffs of the New Jersey Palisades in Palisades Interstate Park.

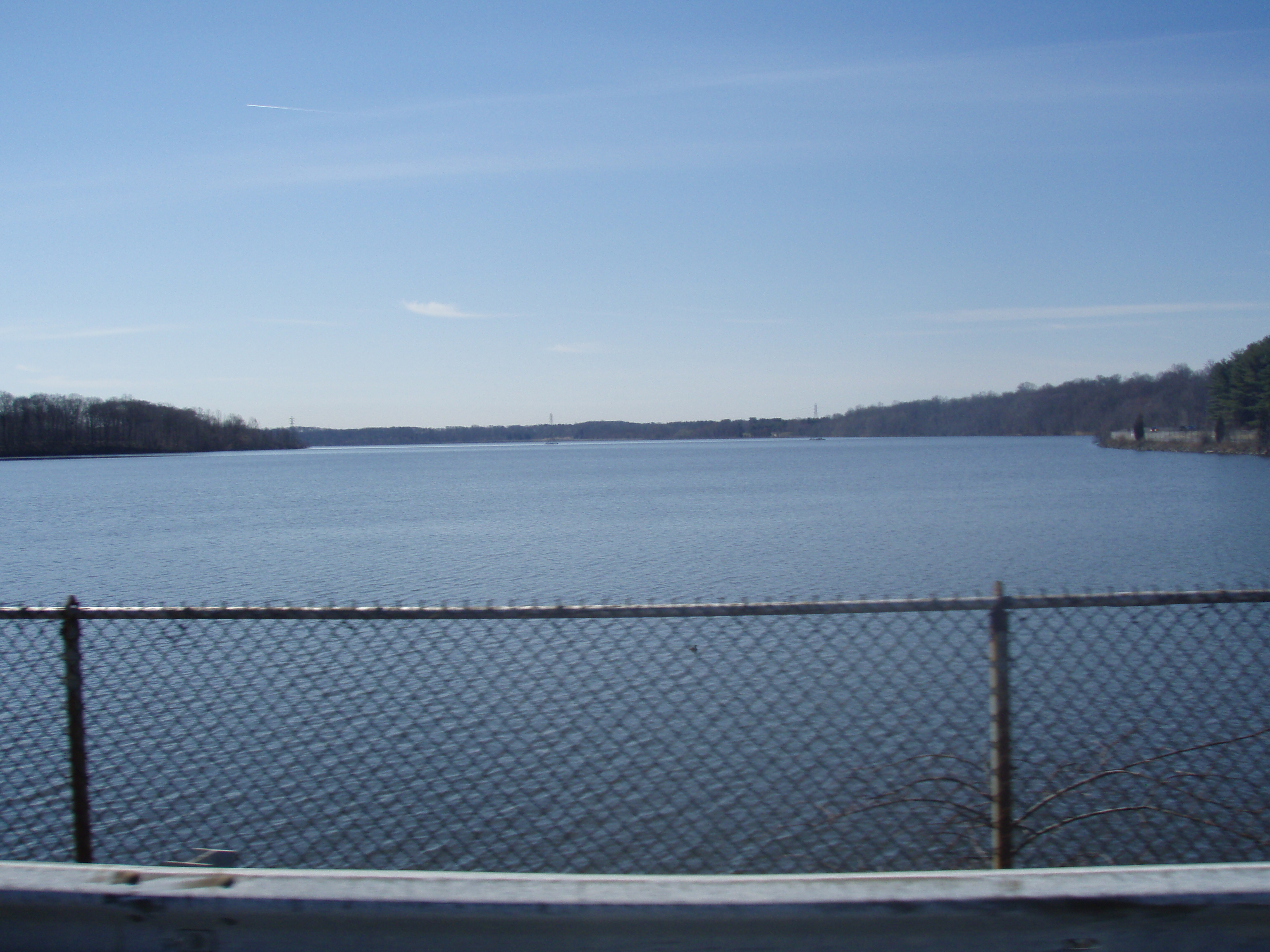
The Lake Tappan reservoir straddles the Bergen County municipalities of Old Tappan and River Vale, as well as a smaller portion within adjacent Rockland County, New York.

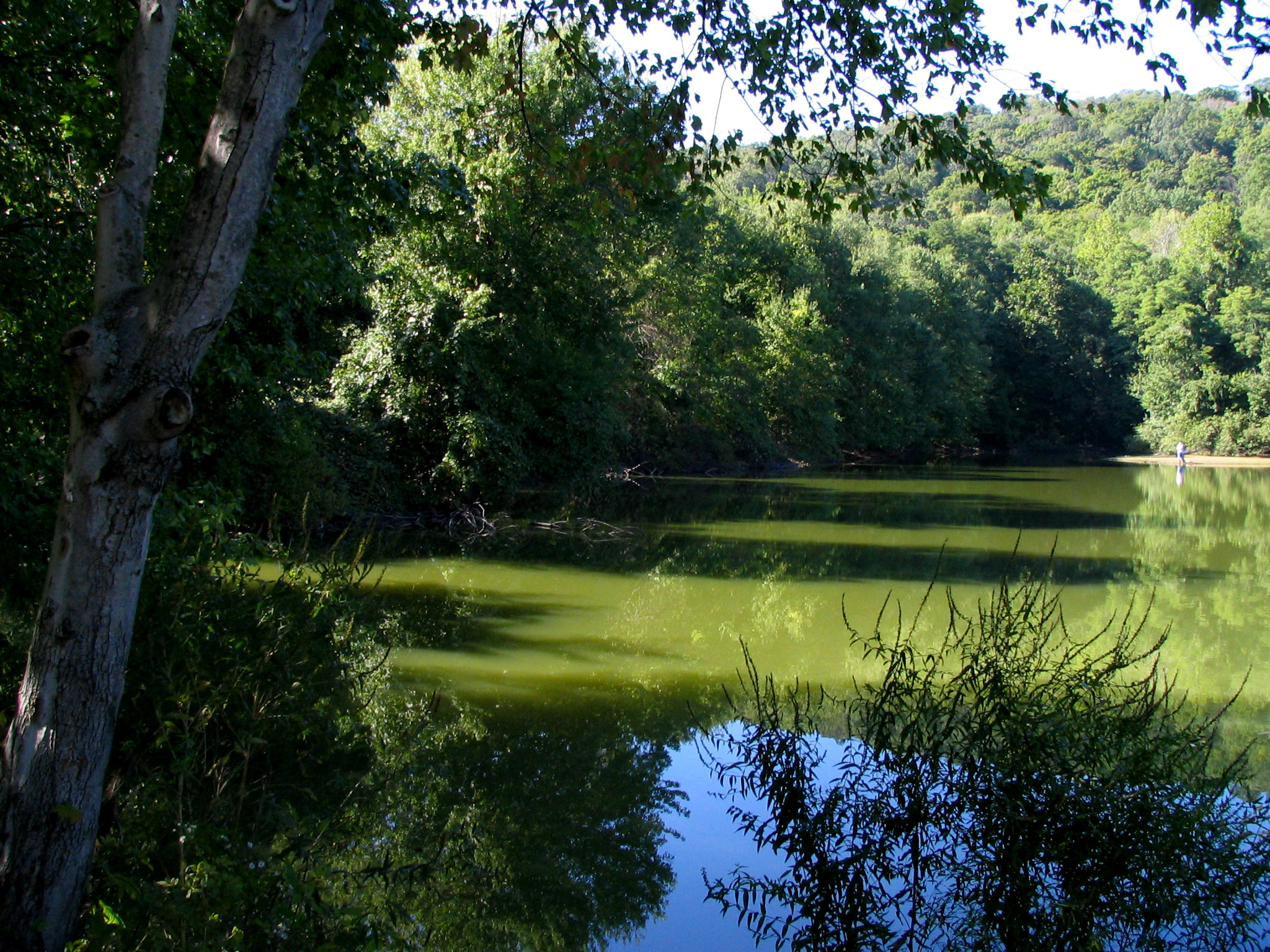
Scarlet Oak Pond, Ramapo Valley County Reservation, Mahwah.

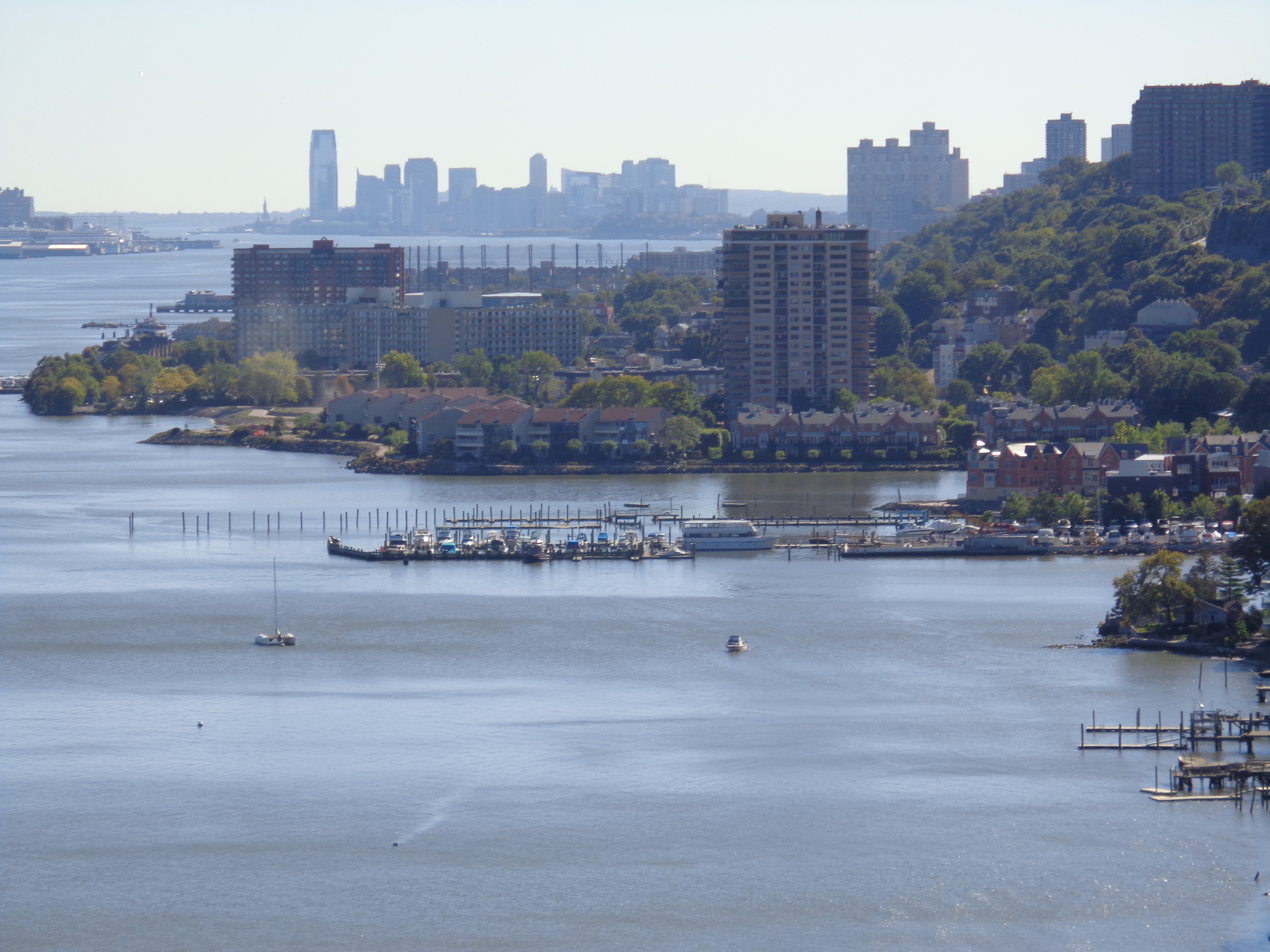
Southward view of the Hudson Waterfront from the George Washington Bridge, with Edgewater in the foreground, and the skyline of Downtown Jersey City, Hudson County in the background.

- New Jersey Naval Museum, Hackensack. At the museum, the USS Ling is moored in the Hackensack River and is available for tours as a museum ship.
- Aviation Hall of Fame and Museum of New Jersey, located at Teterboro Airport in Teterboro.
- Bergen Museum of Art & Science, Hackensack.
- Buehler Challenger & Science Center, Paramus – located on the campus of Bergen Community College.
- Meadowlands Environment Center, Lyndhurst.
- Tenafly Nature Center, Tenafly
- Puffin Foundation, Teaneck
- Maywood Station Museum, Maywood
- Bergen Performing Arts Center, Englewood

=== Commercial and entertainment ===
- MetLife Stadium, which replaced Giants Stadium, in East Rutherford, is the home of the New York Giants and the New York Jets of the National Football League. At a construction cost of approximately $1.6 billion, it was the most expensive stadium ever built until being passed by SoFi Stadium in 2020.
- Meadowlands Arena, East Rutherford (formerly known as the Izod Center, the Continental Airlines Arena and the Brendan Byrne Arena). Opened in 1981, it was formerly home to the New Jersey Devils of the National Hockey League, the New Jersey Nets of the National Basketball Association, and the Seton Hall University Pirates men's basketball team. The arena closed on April 3, 2015.
- Meadowlands Racetrack, East Rutherford
- Garden State Plaza, Paramus, is one of the largest and highest revenue-producing shopping malls in the United States.
- The Shops at Riverside, shopping mall, Hackensack (formerly known as Riverside Square Mall)
- Paramus Park, shopping mall, Paramus
- The Outlets at Bergen Town Center, shopping mall, Paramus (formerly known as the Bergen Mall)
- Fashion Center, shopping mall, Paramus
- H Mart, Asian shopping plaza and supermarket, Ridgefield
- Mitsuwa Marketplace, Japanese shopping plaza and supermarket, Edgewater
- American Dream Meadowlands, retail and entertainment complex that opened on October 25, 2019.

== Government ==
=== County government ===
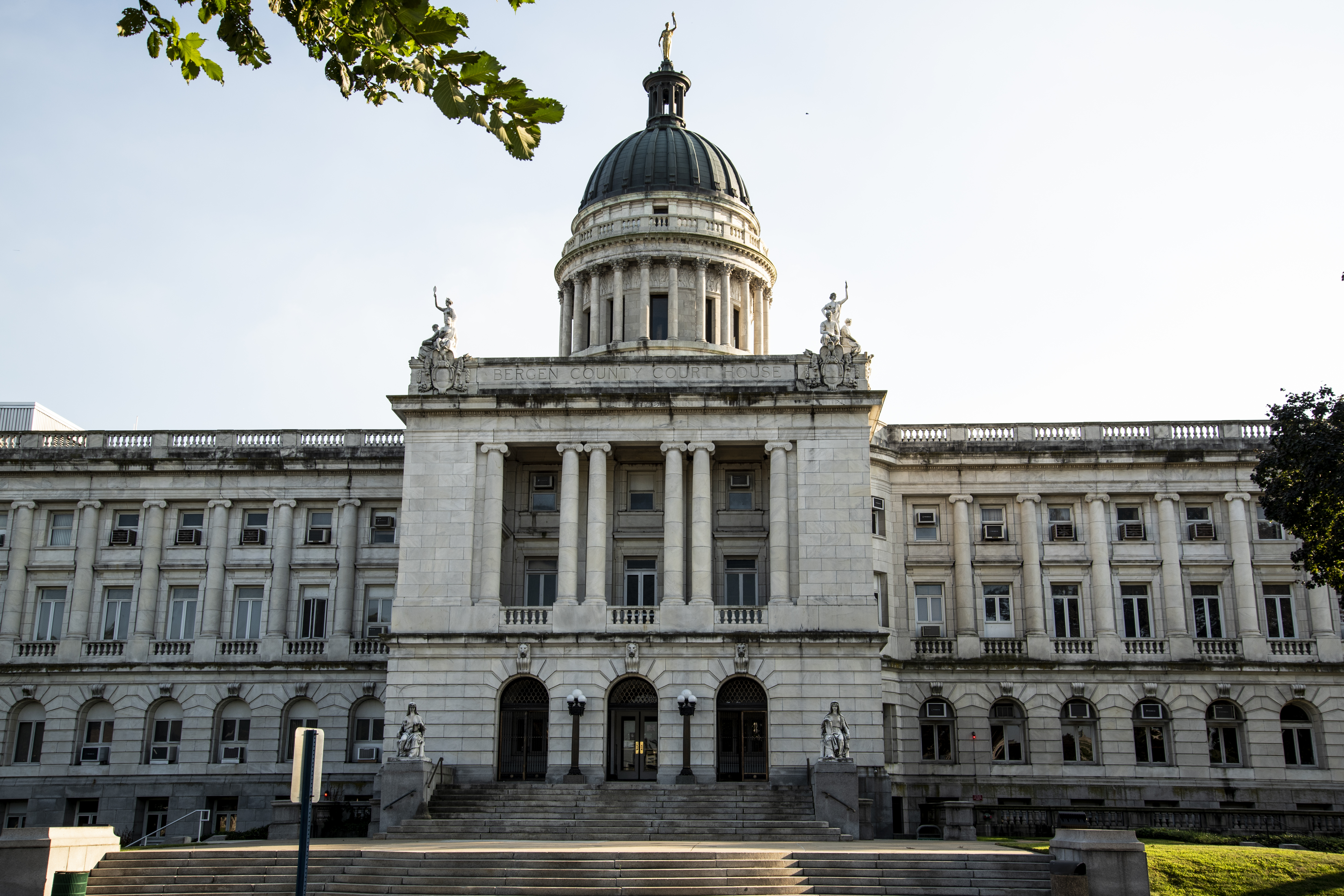
The Bergen County Courthouse in Hackensack, the county seat. The courthouse was constructed in the American Renaissance style and opened in 1912.

Bergen has had a county executive form of government since voters chose the first executive in 1986, joining Atlantic, Essex, Hudson and Mercer counties as one of the 5 of 21 New Jersey counties with an elected executive. The executive oversees the county's business, while the seven-member Bergen County Board of Commissioners has a legislative and oversight role. The Commissioners are elected at-large to three-year terms in office on a staggered basis, with either two or three seats coming up for election each November in a three-year cycle. All members of the governing body are elected at-large on a partisan basis as part of the November general elections. In 2018, commissioners were paid $38,000 and the commissioner chairman was paid an annual salary of $39,000, while the county executive was paid $161,500. Day-to-day oversight of the operation of the county and its departments is delegated to the County Administrator, Thomas J. Duch. Duch took the position in June 2021, succeeding Julien X. Neals who was appointed as a federal judge. As of 2025, the county executive is James J. Tedesco III (D, Paramus), whose four-year term of office ends December 31, 2026.

Bergen County's Commissioners are Chair Mary J. Amoroso (D, Mahwah, 2025), Vice Chair Steven A. Tanelli (D, North Arlington, 2027), Chair Pro Tem Joan Voss (D, Fort Lee, 2026), Rafael Marte (D, Bergenfield, 2026), Germaine M. Ortiz (D, Emerson, 2025), Thomas J. Sullivan Jr. (D, Montvale, 2025) and Tracy Silna Zur (D, Franklin Lakes, 2027).

Pursuant to Article VII Section II of the New Jersey State Constitution, each county in New Jersey is required to have three elected administrative officials known as "constitutional officers." These officers are the County Clerk and County Surrogate (both elected for five-year terms of office) and the County Sheriff (elected for a three-year term). Bergen County's elected constitutional officials are Clerk John S. Hogan (D, Northvale, 2026), Sheriff Anthony Cureton (D, Englewood, 2027) and Surrogate Michael R. Dressler (D, Cresskill, 2026).

The Bergen County Prosecutor is Mark Musella. Musella succeeded acting prosecutor Dennis Calo, who was sworn into office in January 2018 after Gurbir Grewal of Glen Rock left office to become New Jersey Attorney General. Bergen County constitutes Vicinage 2 of the New Jersey Superior Court, which is seated at the Bergen County Justice Center in Hackensack; the Assignment Judge for Vicinage 2 is Bonnie J. Mizdol.

In March 2023, Rafael Marte was selected to fill the seat expiring in December 2023 that had been held by Ramon Hache until he resigned from office earlier that month.

In 2014, Freeholder James Tedesco challenged incumbent Kathleen Donovan on a platform that highlighted his own plan to merge the Bergen County Police Department with the sheriff's office, as well as Donovan's connections to recent scandals in the New Jersey state government, including the nationally reported "Bridgegate" scandal and alleged campaign finance abuse among her staff. Election results showed Tedesco with 54.2% of the vote (107,958), ahead of Donovan with 45.8% (91,299), in a race in which Tedesco's campaign spending nearly $1 million, outspending Donovan by a 2–1 margin; that sweep mirrored that by neighboring Passaic County Democrats, who also defeated the three Republicans elected there in 2010, in the election in 2013, although voters in Passaic County would elect their first Republican candidate since 2013 to the then-renamed Board of County Commissioners in 2021. No Republican has won county-wide office in Bergen County since 2013.

In November 2010, Republican County Clerk Kathleen Donovan won the race for County Executive, defeating Dennis McNerney in his bid for a third term. Three incumbent Freeholders, Chairman James Carroll, Freeholder Elizabeth Calabrese, and Freeholder John Hogan were all defeated by Republican challengers Franklin Lakes Mayor Maura DeNicola, former River Edge Councilman John Felice, and Cliffside Park resident John Mitchell. Incumbent Bergen County Sheriff Leo McGuire also failed in his bid for a third term as Emerson Police Chief Mike Saudino defeated him. As a result of the 2010 elections, Republicans controlled Bergen County government for the first time in nearly a decade, with County Executive Kathleen Donovan and a 5–2 majority on the Board of Chosen Freeholders. Saudino would later face backlash over his remarks disparaging Black Americans and Sikhs—including remarks about Gurbir Grewal, who was the Bergen County prosecutor at the time—and resigned his position in 2018.

=== Law enforcement ===
Negotiations to merge the Bergen County Police Department with the Sheriff's Office began in 2015, and were finally completed in 2021. The County Police Department was created in 1917.

The Bergen County court system consists of a number of municipal courts handling traffic court and other minor matters, plus the Bergen County Superior Court which handles more serious offenses. Law enforcement at the county level includes the Bergen County Sheriff's Office and the Bergen County Prosecutor's Office. Bergen County's first female police chief took office in September 2015, as police chief of Bergenfield. In August 2015, a branding campaign was launched to highlight county government services, with its centerpiece being the official seal of Bergen County, depicting a Dutch settler shaking hands with a Native American. The county's contemporaneous executive James Tedesco made an approximately $5,000 private donation to initiate the effort in the form of a nine-foot rendering of this seal woven into the carpet of the county executive's office.

=== Highlands protection ===
In 2004, the New Jersey Legislature passed the Highlands Water Protection and Planning Act, which regulates the New Jersey Highlands region. A portion of the northwestern area of the county, comprising the municipalities of Oakland and Mahwah, was included in the highlands preservation area and is subject to the rules of the act and the Highlands Water Protection and Planning Council, a division of the New Jersey Department of Environmental Protection. Some of the territory in the protected region is classified as being in the highlands preservation area, and thus subject to additional rules.

=== Federal representatives ===
The county is part of two Congressional Districts: the 5th District covering the northern portion of the county and the 9th most of the south. For the 119th United States Congress, New Jersey's 5th congressional district is represented by Josh Gottheimer (D, Wyckoff). For the 119th United States Congress, New Jersey's 9th congressional district is represented by Nellie Pou (D, North Haledon)

=== State representatives ===
The 70 municipalities of Bergen County are represented by six separate state legislative districts.

District	Senator	Assembly	Municipalities
35th	Benjie E. Wimberly (D)	Al Abdelaziz (D); Kenyatta Stewart (D)	Elmwood Park and Garfield. The remainder of the district covers portions of Passaic County.
36th	Paul Sarlo (D)	Clinton Calabrese (D); Gary Schaer (D)	Carlstadt, Cliffside Park, East Rutherford, Edgewater, Fairview, Lyndhurst, North Arlington, Ridgefield, Rutherford, Wallington, and Wood-Ridge. The remainder of the district covers portions of Passaic County.
37th	Gordon M. Johnson (D)	Ellen Park (D) Shama Haider (D)	Bogota, Englewood, Englewood Cliffs, Fort Lee, Hackensack, Leonia, Palisades Park, Ridgefield Park, Teaneck, and Tenafly.
38th	Joseph Lagana (D)	Chris Tully (D); Lisa Swain (D)	Bergenfield, Fair Lawn, Glen Rock, Hasbrouck Heights, Little Ferry, Lodi, Maywood, Moonachie, New Milford, Oradell, Paramus, River Edge, Rochelle Park, Saddle Brook, South Hackensack, and Teterboro.
39th	Holly Schepisi (R)	Robert Auth (R); John Azzariti (R)	Allendale, Alpine, Closter, Cresskill, Demarest, Dumont, Emerson, Harrington Park, Haworth, Hillsdale, Ho-Ho-Kus, Mahwah, Midland Park, Montvale, Northvale, Norwood, Oakland, Old Tappan, Park Ridge, Ramsey, River Vale, Rockleigh, Saddle River, Upper Saddle River, Waldwick, Washington Township, Westwood, and Woodcliff Lake.
40th	Kristin Corrado (R)	Christopher DePhillips (R); Al Barlas (R)	Franklin Lakes, Ridgewood, and Wyckoff. The remainder of the district covers portions of Essex County and Passaic County.

== Politics ==
United States presidential election results for Bergen County, New Jersey
Year	Republican		Democratic		Third party(ies)	
Year	No.	%	No.	%	No.	%
1896	8,545	62.07%	4,531	32.91%	690	5.01%
1900	9,086	56.91%	6,458	40.45%	422	2.64%
1904	9,957	54.65%	7,301	40.08%	960	5.27%
1908	14,043	61.51%	7,629	33.42%	1,158	5.07%
1912	5,087	20.46%	9,978	40.12%	9,803	39.42%
1916	18,494	60.05%	11,530	37.44%	773	2.51%
1920	47,512	76.26%	12,396	19.90%	2,397	3.85%
1924	60,803	69.41%	16,844	19.23%	9,951	11.36%
1928	89,105	63.62%	50,373	35.96%	589	0.42%
1932	86,885	52.42%	73,921	44.60%	4,937	2.98%
1936	89,628	49.28%	91,107	50.09%	1,143	0.63%
1940	131,588	63.01%	76,541	36.65%	694	0.33%
1944	142,836	65.00%	76,350	34.74%	566	0.26%
1948	142,657	65.70%	69,132	31.84%	5,342	2.46%
1952	212,842	69.22%	93,373	30.37%	1,287	0.42%
1956	254,334	75.22%	82,169	24.30%	1,610	0.48%
1960	224,969	58.92%	156,165	40.90%	674	0.18%
1964	157,899	40.13%	234,849	59.69%	717	0.18%
1968	224,911	54.45%	162,182	39.27%	25,944	6.28%
1972	285,458	65.34%	147,155	33.68%	4,281	0.98%
1976	237,331	55.86%	180,738	42.54%	6,784	1.60%
1980	232,043	55.89%	139,474	33.60%	43,640	10.51%
1984	268,507	63.22%	155,039	36.50%	1,172	0.28%
1988	226,885	58.19%	160,655	41.20%	2,393	0.61%
1992	178,223	44.21%	171,104	42.44%	53,810	13.35%
1996	141,164	38.90%	191,085	52.66%	30,638	8.44%
2000	152,731	41.65%	202,682	55.27%	11,308	3.08%
2004	189,833	47.43%	207,666	51.88%	2,745	0.69%
2008	186,118	44.75%	225,367	54.19%	4,424	1.06%
2012	169,070	43.80%	212,754	55.12%	4,166	1.08%
2016	175,529	41.57%	231,211	54.76%	15,473	3.66%
2020	204,417	41.23%	285,967	57.67%	5,465	1.10%
2024	217,096	47.29%	232,660	50.68%	9,321	2.03%

The county leans Democratic and is characterized by a divide between mostly Republican communities in the north and northwest of the county, and mostly Democratic communities in its center and southeast. That dichotomy largely remained in place for quite a while, until 2020. Mirroring the national "suburban revolt" against President Donald Trump, Democratic candidate Joe Biden made significant gains in the northern portion of the county, winning in many affluent and typically Republican voting communities, such as River Vale, Ho-Ho-Kus, Ramsey, Allendale, Hillsdale, and Montvale, winning in Upper Saddle River by a mere 2 vote margin. He also won somewhat less affluent suburban towns such as Mahwah, Waldwick, and Midland Park, along with surpassing the margins of victory obtained by Hillary Clinton in municipalities like Fair Lawn, Glen Rock, Ridgewood, and wealthier southern Bergen towns like Rutherford (although the results in most of the rest of southern Bergen largely stayed the same compared to 2016 - either Biden or Trump barely won the more blue-collar towns of Carlstadt (Trump, by 57 votes)/East Rutherford (Biden, 485)/Lyndhurst (Trump, 68)/Moonachie (Biden, 48)/North Arlington (Trump, just 5)/South Hackensack (Biden, 88), while Trump's margins of defeat shrank in Garfield/Lodi, and his margin of victory grew in Wallington, all compared to 2016).

In fact, the 2020 presidential election saw Joe Biden win the county by the largest margin for a Democrat since 1964, and marked the first time the county voted to the left of the state since 1904. In 2024, however, Bergen mirrored the rest of the state by shifting heavily to the right, cutting the margin down to less than 4% - the best Republican result since the county was won outright by Republicans in 1992. Bergen County returned to voting to the right of the state in this election, albeit by a very small margin.

As of October 1, 2021, there were a total of 688,213 registered voters in Bergen County, of whom 265,251 (38.5%) were registered as Democrats, 150,812 (21.9%) were registered as Republicans, and 265,186 (38.5%) were registered as unaffiliated. There were 6,965 voters (1.0%) registered to other parties. Among the county's 2010 Census population, 61.4% were registered to vote, including 77.4% of those ages 18 and over.

Senate Class 1 election results

United States Senate election results for Bergen County, New Jersey1
Year	Republican		Democratic		Third party(ies)	
Year	No.	%	No.	%	No.	%
2024	192,452	44.98%	224,775	52.54%	10,607	2.48%
2018	146,406	42.54%	188,235	54.69%	9,542	2.77%
2012	144,709	41.09%	201,870	57.33%	5,558	1.58%
2006	118,199	45.26%	139,564	53.44%	3,388	1.30%
2000	174,949	49.75%	171,017	48.64%	5,658	1.61%
1994	122,843	47.57%	131,252	50.82%	4,165	1.61%
1988	172,257	45.48%	199,195	52.59%	7,291	1.93%
1982	154,691	50.70%	147,811	48.45%	2,582	0.85%

Senate Class 2 election results

United States Senate election results for Bergen County, New Jersey2
Year	Republican		Democratic		Third party(ies)	
Year	No.	%	No.	%	No.	%
2020	195,193	40.38%	280,054	57.94%	8,103	1.68%
2014	89,597	41.25%	124,409	57.28%	3,204	1.48%
2013	61,622	42.38%	82,526	56.75%	1,266	0.87%
2008	159,306	42.84%	210,799	56.69%	1,724	0.46%
2002	110,272	43.40%	139,241	54.81%	4,547	1.79%
1996	150,655	43.60%	185,365	53.64%	9,544	2.76%
1990	121,600	49.47%	121,020	49.24%	3,180	1.29%
1984	148,080	35.87%	262,694	63.64%	2,015	0.49%

=== State elections ===
Governor election results

Gubernatorial election results for Bergen County, New Jersey
Year	Republican		Democratic		Third party(ies)	
Year	No.	%	No.	%	No.	%
2025	152,682	44.30%	190,461	55.26%	1,518	0.44%
2021	129,644	46.91%	145,150	52.52%	1,556	0.56%
2017	94,904	41.64%	129,265	56.71%	3,760	1.65%
2013	136,178	60.24%	87,376	38.65%	2,515	1.11%
2009	121,446	46.26%	127,386	48.52%	13,714	5.22%
2005	108,017	42.19%	142,319	55.59%	5,683	2.22%
2001	111,221	43.69%	140,215	55.09%	3,106	1.22%
1997	148,934	53.25%	118,834	42.49%	11,903	4.26%
1993	157,710	50.76%	147,387	47.44%	5,594	1.80%
1989	109,184	39.16%	165,104	59.22%	4,524	1.62%
1985	181,238	71.55%	70,525	27.84%	1,554	0.61%
1981	169,556	54.14%	141,018	45.03%	2,609	0.83%
1977	111,858	41.48%	153,434	56.90%	4,359	1.62%
1973	106,904	34.76%	196,661	63.94%	4,021	1.31%
1969	218,908	62.78%	124,304	35.65%	5,458	1.57%
1965	138,097	43.12%	179,197	55.95%	2,997	0.94%
1961	171,180	57.47%	123,421	41.44%	3,236	1.09%
1957	146,305	52.13%	132,805	47.32%	1,529	0.54%
1953	115,605	50.15%	110,530	47.95%	4,365	1.89%

== Municipalities ==
Labeled outline map of Bergen County municipalities.

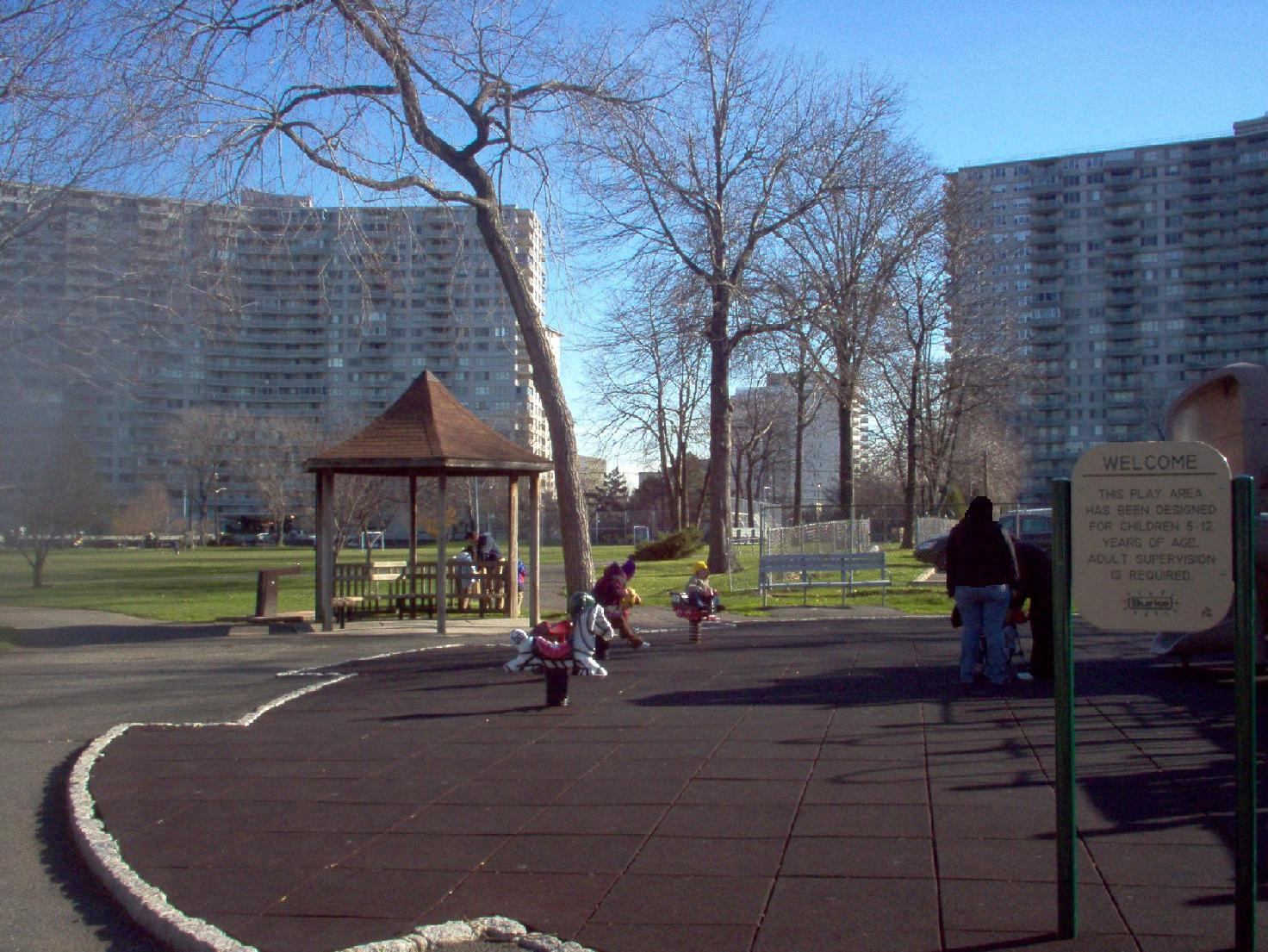
Constitution Park in Fort Lee. High-rise residential complexes are a prominent feature of this borough, with several over 300 feet tall.

Interactive map of municipalities in Bergen County.

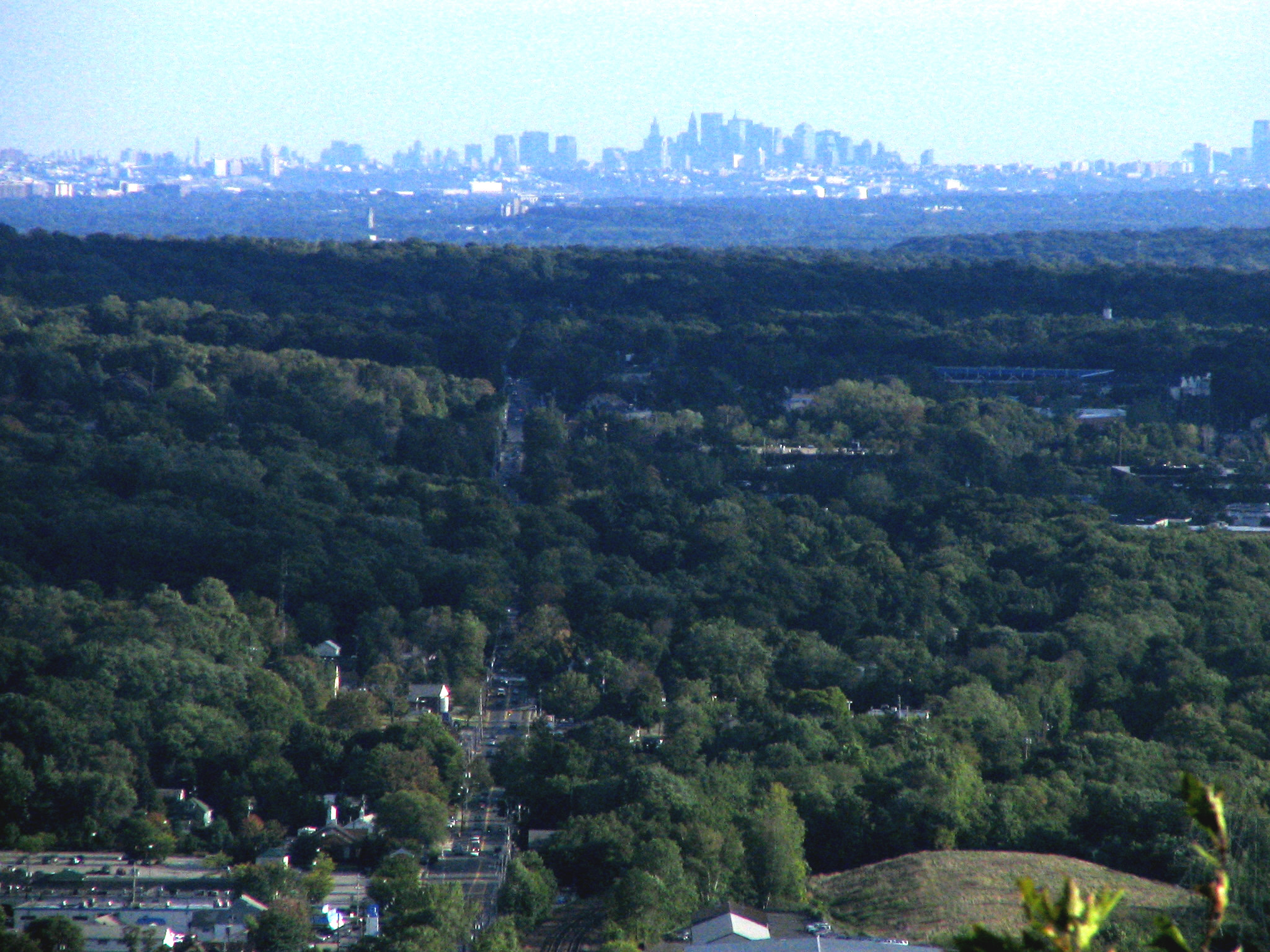

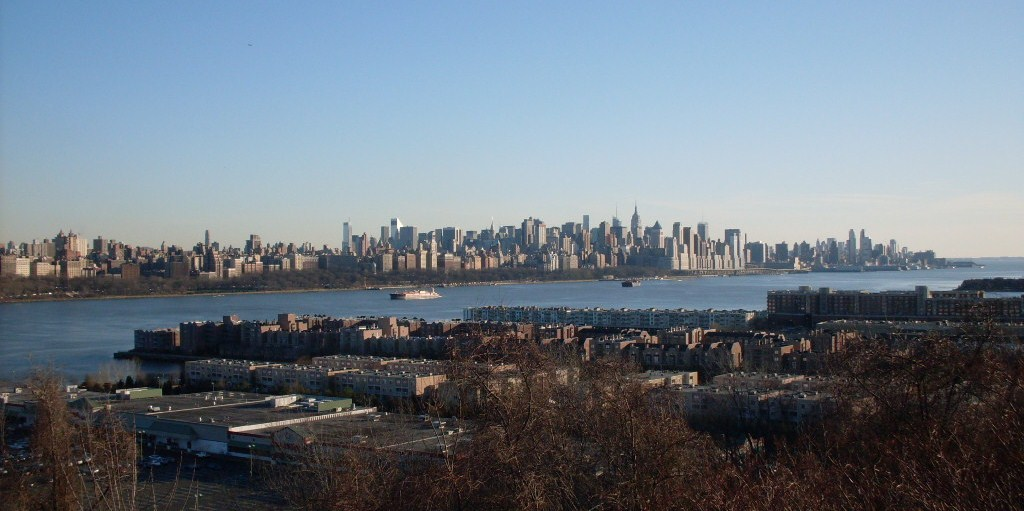
The skyline of Manhattan as viewed from Mahwah, Bergen County's northernmost borough (above); and across the Hudson River from Cliffside Park, near the county's southeast border (below).

In the last decades of the 19th century, Bergen County, to a far greater extent than any other county in the state, began dividing its townships up into incorporated boroughs; this was chiefly due to the "boroughitis" phenomenon, triggered by a number of loopholes in state laws that allowed boroughs to levy lower taxes and send more members to the county's board of freeholders. There was a 10-year period in which many of Bergen County's townships disappeared into the patchwork of boroughs that exist today, before the state laws governing municipal incorporation were changed.

The county has 70 municipalities, the highest number of any county in the state, with 56 of them being boroughs.

The 70 municipalities in Bergen County (with 2010 Census data for population, housing units and area) are:

Municipality (with map key)	Municipal type	Population	Housing Units	Total Area	Water Area	Land Area	Pop. Density	Housing Density	School District	Communities
Allendale	borough	6,848	2,388	3.12	0.02	3.10	2,100.7	771.2	Northern Highlands (9-12); Allendale (PK-8)	
Alpine	borough	1,762	670	9.23	2.82	6.41	288.4	104.5	Tenafly (9-12); Alpine (K-8)	
Bergenfield	borough	28,321	9,200	2.89	0.01	2.88	9,306.5	3,199.1	Bergenfield	
Bogota	borough	8,778	2,888	0.81	0.05	0.76	10,702.5	3,775.4	Bogota	
Carlstadt	borough	6,372	2,495	4.24	0.24	4.00	1,532.1	623.9	Carlstadt-East Rutherford (9-12); Carlstadt (PK-8)	
Cliffside Park	borough	25,693	10,665	0.96	0.00	0.96	24,508.7	11,078.5	Cliffside Park	Grantwood (part)
Closter	borough	8,594	2,860	3.30	0.13	3.16	2,646.0	903.8	Northern Valley (9-12); Closter (PK-8)	
Cresskill	borough	9,155	3,114	2.07	0.01	2.06	4,154.5	1,509.0	Cresskill	
Demarest	borough	4,981	1,659	2.08	0.01	2.07	2,361.8	802.7	Northern Valley (9-12); Demarest (PK-8)	
Dumont	borough	17,863	6,542	1.99	0.00	1.98	8,814.7	3,299.2	Dumont	
East Rutherford	borough	10,022	4,018	4.05	0.34	3.71	2,403.2	1,083.4	Carlstadt-East Rutherford (9-12); East Rutherford (PK-8)	
Edgewater	borough	14,336	6,282	2.42	1.49	0.94	12,312.0	6,718.0	Leonia (7-12) (S/R); Edgewater (PK-6)	
Elmwood Park	borough	21,422	7,385	2.76	0.11	2.65	7,327.9	2,789.1	Elmwood Park	
Emerson	borough	7,290	2,552	2.40	0.20	2.20	3,358.9	1,158.2	Emerson	
Englewood	city	29,308	10,695	4.94	0.02	4.91	5,524.6	2,176.5	Englewood	
Englewood Cliffs	borough	5,342	1,924	3.33	1.24	2.09	2,528.1	921.0	Englewood (9-12) (S/R); Englewood Cliffs (PK-8)	
Fair Lawn	borough	34,927	12,266	5.20	0.06	5.14	6,315.4	2,386.7	Fair Lawn	Radburn
Fairview	borough	15,025	5,150	0.84	0.00	0.84	16,421.8	6,112.9	Cliffside Park (9-12) (S/R); Fairview (PK-8)	
Fort Lee	borough	40,191	17,818	2.89	0.35	2.54	13,910.9	7,012.7	Fort Lee	
Franklin Lakes	borough	11,079	3,692	9.85	0.47	9.38	1,129.1	393.6	Ramapo Indian Hills (9-12); Franklin Lakes (PK-8)	
Garfield	city	32,655	11,788	2.16	0.06	2.10	14,524.8	5,616.1	Garfield	
Glen Rock	borough	12,133	4,016	2.74	0.02	2.71	4,275.2	1,480.0	Glen Rock	
Hackensack	city	46,030	19,375	4.35	0.17	4.18	10,290.0	4,635.4	Hackensack	
Harrington Park	borough	4,741	1,624	2.06	0.23	1.83	2,545.9	886.5	Northern Valley (9-12); Harrington Park (PK-8)	
Hasbrouck Heights	borough	12,125	4,627	1.51	0.00	1.51	7,865.4	3,073.2	Hasbrouck Heights	
Haworth	borough	3,343	1,136	2.36	0.41	1.94	1,739.2	584.2	Northern Valley (9-12); Haworth (PK-8)	
Hillsdale	borough	10,143	3,567	2.96	0.01	2.95	3,464.8	1,209.4	Pascack Valley (9-12); Hillsdale (PK-8)	
Ho-Ho-Kus	borough	4,258	1,462	1.75	0.01	1.74	2,350.3	842.6	Northern Highlands (9-12); Ho-Ho-Kus (PK-8)	
Leonia	borough	9,304	3,428	1.63	0.10	1.54	5,819.5	2,232.2	Leonia	
Little Ferry	borough	10,987	4,439	1.70	0.23	1.48	7,200.1	3,007.8	Ridgefield Park (9-12) (S/R); Little Ferry (PK-8)	
Lodi	borough	26,206	10,127	2.29	0.02	2.26	10,657.6	4,471.7	Lodi	
Lyndhurst	township	22,519	8,787	4.89	0.34	4.56	4,509.3	1,927.7	Lyndhurst	Kingsland
Mahwah	township	25,487	9,868	26.19	0.50	25.69	1,007.7	384.1	Mahwah Township	Cragmere Park; Darlington; Fardale; Masonicus; Pulis Mills; Ramapo College of New Jersey CDP (2,200)
Maywood	borough	10,080	3,769	1.29	0.00	1.29	7,428.0	2,930.0	Hackensack (9-12) (S/R); Maywood (PK-8)	
Midland Park	borough	7,014	2,861	1.56	0.01	1.56	4,583.2	1,839.6	Midland Park	Wortendyke
Montvale	borough	8,436	2,872	4.01	0.01	4.00	1,961.2	718.1	Pascack Valley (9-12); Montvale (PK-8)	
Moonachie	borough	3,133	1,053	1.68	0.01	1.66	1,626.5	632.5	Wood-Ridge (9-12) (S/R) Moonachie (PK-8)	
New Milford	borough	16,923	6,362	2.31	0.03	2.27	7,186.0	2,797.7	New Milford	
North Arlington	borough	16,457	6,573	2.62	0.06	2.56	6,010.3	2,566.6	North Arlington	
Northvale	borough	4,761	1,635	1.30	0.00	1.30	3,582.3	1,262.3	Northern Valley (9-12); Northvale (PK-8)	
Norwood	borough	5,641	2,007	2.73	0.01	2.73	2,093.5	735.7	Northern Valley (9-12); Norwood (PK-8)	
Oakland	borough	12,748	4,470	8.73	0.27	8.45	1,508.6	528.7	Ramapo Indian Hills (9-12); Oakland (K-8)	
Old Tappan	borough	5,888	1,995	4.20	0.87	3.33	1,725.8	598.8	Northern Valley (9-12); Old Tappan (K-8)	
Oradell	borough	8,244	2,831	2.58	0.15	2.42	3,291.5	1,168.0	River Dell (7-12); Oradell (K-6)	
Palisades Park	borough	20,292	7,362	1.28	0.02	1.25	15,681.6	5,883.6	Palisades Park	
Paramus	borough	26,698	8,915	10.52	0.05	10.47	2,516.0	851.5	Paramus	Arcola
Park Ridge	borough	8,883	3,428	2.60	0.02	2.58	3,348.6	1,327.8	Park Ridge	
Ramsey	borough	14,798	5,550	5.59	0.07	5.52	2,621.9	1,005.4	Ramsey	
Ridgefield	borough	11,501	4,145	2.85	0.30	2.55	4,323.7	1,624.5	Ridgefield	Grantwood (part)
Ridgefield Park	village	13,224	5,164	1.92	0.20	1.72	7,385.6	2,996.2	Ridgefield Park	
Ridgewood	village	25,979	8,743	5.82	0.07	5.75	4,339.0	1,520.0	Ridgewood	
River Edge	borough	12,049	4,261	1.90	0.04	1.85	6,116.3	2,298.2	River Dell (7-12); River Edge Elementary (PK-6)	
River Vale	township	9,909	3,521	4.28	0.26	4.01	2,408.1	877.8	Pascack Valley (9-12); River Vale (PK-8)	
Rochelle Park	township	5,814	2,170	1.06	0.02	1.04	5,313.8	2,085.2	Hackensack (9-12) (S/R); Rochelle Park (PK-8)	
Rockleigh	borough	407	86	0.98	0.01	0.97	548.1	88.8	Northern Valley (9-12) (S/R); Northvale (K-8) (S/R)	
Rutherford	borough	18,834	7,278	2.94	0.14	2.81	6,437.4	2,594.1	Rutherford	
Saddle Brook	township	14,294	5,485	2.72	0.03	2.69	5,080.2	2,040.0	Saddle Brook	
Saddle River	borough	3,372	1,341	4.98	0.06	4.92	640.2	272.4	Northern Highlands (9-12) (S/R); Ramsey (6-12) (S/R); Saddle River (PK-5)	
South Hackensack	township	2,701	879	0.74	0.02	0.72	3,311.7	1,224.1	Hackensack (9-12) (S/R); South Hackensack (PK-8)	
Teaneck	township	41,246	14,024	6.23	0.22	6.01	6,622.2	2,334.8	Teaneck	
Tenafly	borough	15,409	4,980	5.18	0.58	4.60	3,148.6	1,082.3	Tenafly	
Teterboro	borough	61	27	1.16	0.00	1.16	57.9	23.3	Hasbrouck Heights	
Upper Saddle River	borough	8,353	2,776	5.28	0.02	5.26	1,560.0	527.6	Northern Highlands (9-12); Upper Saddle River (PK-8)	
Waldwick	borough	10,058	3,537	2.09	0.02	2.07	4,656.8	1,711.3	Waldwick	
Wallington	borough	11,868	4,946	1.03	0.05	0.98	11,528.6	5,030.5	Wallington	
Washington Township	township	9,285	3,341	2.96	0.05	2.91	3,128.8	1,148.5	Westwood Regional	
Westwood	borough	11,282	4,636	2.31	0.05	2.27	4,814.5	2,046.2	Westwood Regional	
Woodcliff Lake	borough	6,128	1,980	3.61	0.20	3.41	1,682.7	581.5	Pascack Valley (9-12); Woodcliff Lake (PK-8)	
Wood-Ridge	borough	10,137	3,051	1.10	0.00	1.10	6,951.6	2,781.2	Wood-Ridge	
Wyckoff	township	16,585	5,827	6.61	0.06	6.55	2,550.1	890.0	Ramapo Indian Hills (9-12); Wyckoff (PK-8)	
Bergen County	county	955,732	352,388	246.67	13.66	233.01	3,884.5	1,512.3		

=== Historical municipalities ===
Over the history of the county, there have been various municipality secessions, annexations and renamings. The following is a partial list of former municipalities, ordered by year of incorporation.

- Bergen Township, 1683–1862
- Hackensack Township, 1693
- New Barbadoes Township, 1710–1921
- Saddle River Township, 1716–1955
- Franklin Township, 1771–1926
- Harrington Township, 1775–1916
- Lodi Township, 1825–1935
- Hohokus Township, 1849
- Union Township, 1852
- Midland Township, 1871
- Englewood Township, 1871–1899
- Palisades Township, 1871–1922
- Ridgefield Township, 1871
- Ridgewood Township, 1876
- Orvil Township, 1886–1919
- Boiling Springs Township, 1885
- Bergen Township, 1893–1902
- Eastwood Borough, 1894–1896
- Overpeck Township, 1897–1938

== Economy ==
Employment by industries

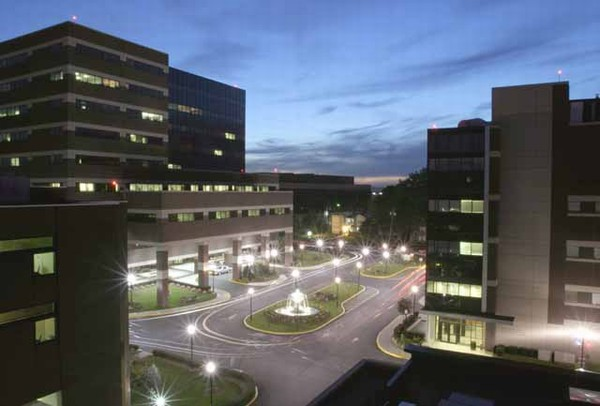
Hackensack University Medical Center in Hackensack is the largest employer in Bergen County.

The Bureau of Economic Analysis calculated that the county's gross domestic product was $81.5 billion in 2022, which was ranked first in the state and was a 1.2% increase from the prior year.

=== Largest employers ===
According to the Bergen County Economic Development Corporation, the largest employers in Bergen County as of November 2025, as ranked with at least 1,000 employees in the county, were as follows:

- Hackensack University Medical Center, Hackensack, 9,000
- Valley Health System, Ridgewood, 48660
- Bio-Reference Laboratories, Inc., Elmwood Park, 2,900
- Express Scripts, Franklin Lakes, 2,800
- County of Bergen, Hackensack, 2,390
- Quest Diagnostics, Teterboro/Lyndhurst, 2,200
- KPMG, Montvale, 2,100
- Englewood Hospital and Medical Center, Englewood, 2,002
- Englewood Hospital Home Health Care Services, Englewood, 1,985
- Unilever Bestfoods, Englewood Cliffs, 1,900
- Stryker Corporation, Allendale/Mahwah, 1,812
- Bergen Regional Medical Center, Paramus, 1,746
- Holy Name Medical Center, Teaneck, 1,695
- Becton Dickinson, Franklin Lakes, 1,500
- Crestron Electronics, Rockleigh/Cresskill, 1,500
- BMW of North America, Woodcliff Lake, 1,000

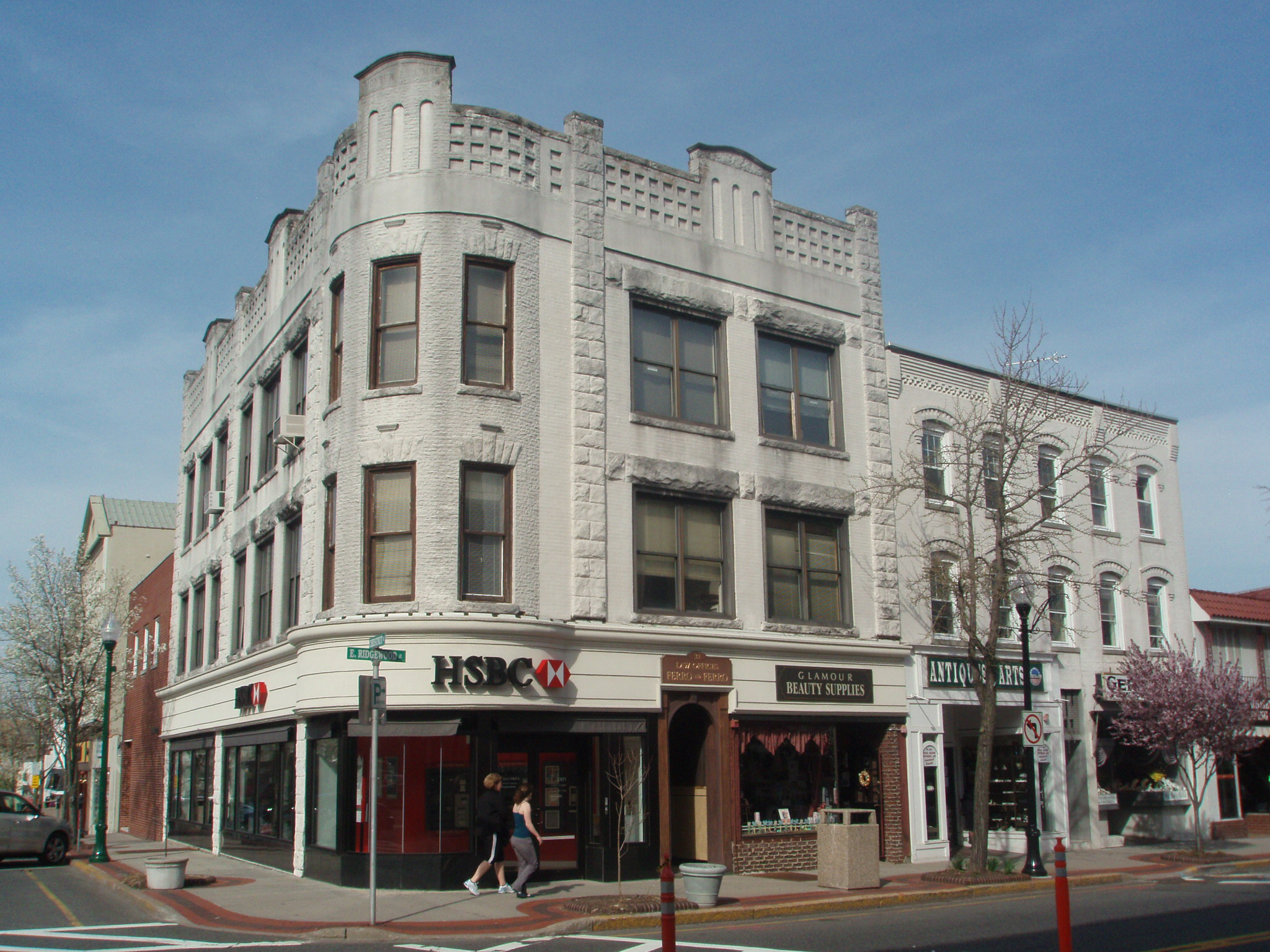
Downtown Ridgewood, one of many pedestrian-oriented municipal commercial centers in Bergen County

In January 2015, Mercedes-Benz USA announced that it would be moving its headquarters from the borough of Montvale in Bergen County to the Atlanta, Georgia, area as of July. The company had been based in northern New Jersey since 1972 and has had 1,000 employees on a 37-acre (15 ha) campus in Montvale. Despite incentive offers from the State of New Jersey to remain in Bergen County, Mercedes-Benz cited proximity to its Alabama manufacturing facility and a growing customer base in the southeastern United States, in addition to as much as $50 million in tax incentives from Georgia governmental agencies, in explaining its decision to move. However, Mercedes-Benz USA also stated its intent to maintain its Northeast regional headquarters in Montvale and to build a "state-of-the-art" assemblage training center in the borough as well.

=== Building permits ===
In 2011, Bergen County issued 1,903 new building permits for residential construction, the largest number in New Jersey.

==== Retail ====
The retail industry, anchored in Paramus, is a mainstay of the Bergen County economy, with a combined payroll of $1.7 billion as of 2012. The largest retail entities are described below in further detail:

=== Garden State Plaza ===
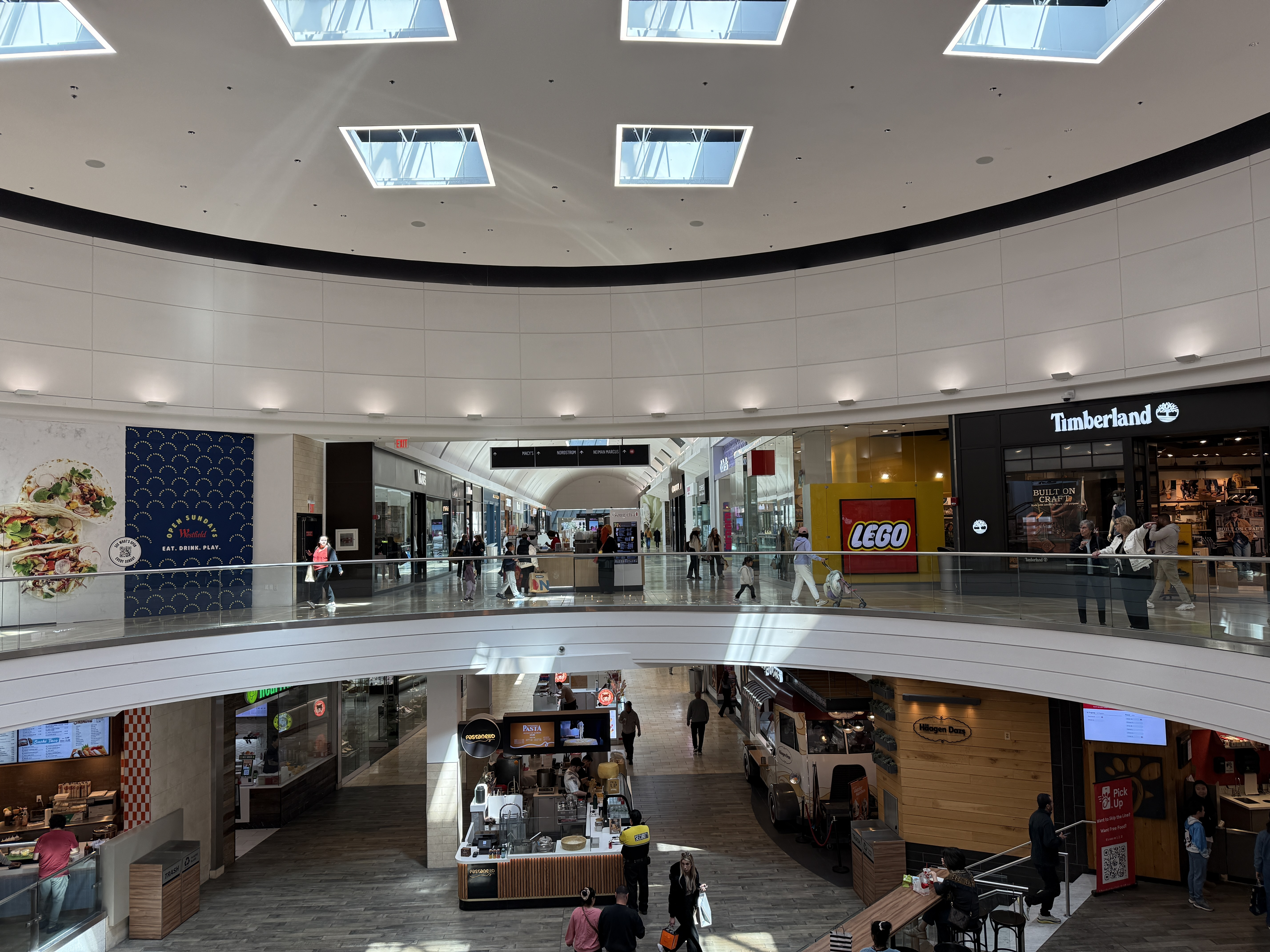
Interior of the Garden State Plaza in Paramus, whose 07652 ZIP Code produces more than $6 billion in retail sales annually, the top in the United States

The Garden State Plaza megamall is located in Paramus. The mall is owned and managed by Paris-based real estate management company Unibail-Rodamco-Westfield, and located at the intersection of Route 4 and Route 17 near the Garden State Parkway, about 15 miles (24 km) west of Manhattan. Opened in 1957 as the first suburban shopping mall in New Jersey, it contains 2,118,718 sq ft (196,835.3 m^{2}) of leasable space, and housing over 300 stores, it is the second-largest mall in New Jersey, the third-largest mall in the New York metropolitan area, and one of the highest-revenue producing malls in the United States.

=== American Dream Meadowlands ===
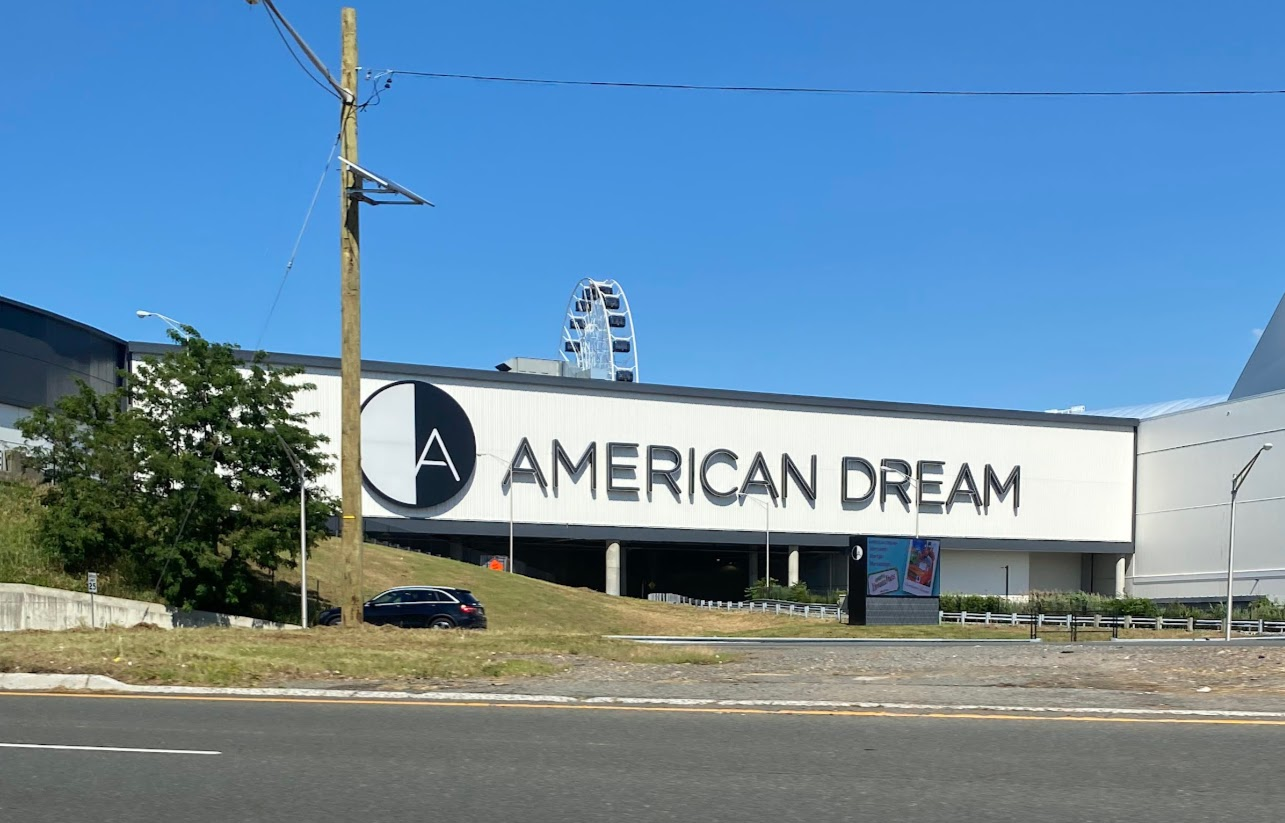
The exterior of the American Dream Meadowlands megamall in East Rutherford

American Dream, located 8 miles (13 km) south of Garden State Plaza, is another large retail and entertainment complex, situated in the Meadowlands Sports Complex in East Rutherford. The first and second of four opening stages occurred on October 25, 2019, and on December 5, 2019. The remaining opening stages occurred on October 1, 2020, and thereafter. As of January 2023, the megamall hosts over 200 stores and other commercial establishments.

=== Blue laws ===
Bergen County enforces one of the last remaining U.S. blue laws that cover most retail sales, other than food and gasoline (among other limited items). The law enforced in the county is actually a state law that each county could reject by voter referendum, with 20 of the state's 21 counties having voted to reject the legal option to enforce the law. Thus one of the largest and most popular commercial shopping cores of the New York metropolitan area is almost completely closed on Sunday. Grocery stores, convenience stores, gas stations, hotels, restaurants, pharmacies, entertainment venues, and any other exempted establishments that do not sell clothing, shoes, furniture, electronics, hardware, and home appliances are among the businesses allowed to operate. Furthermore, Bergen County has significant populations of Jewish (2000 estimate of 83,700) and Muslim (2000 estimate of 6,473) residents whose observant members would not be celebrating the Sunday Sabbath with most of their Christian neighbors. The substantial Orthodox Jewish minority is placed in the position of being unable to shop either on Sunday (due to the blue laws) or on Saturday (due to religious observance).

However, repeated attempts by voters to repeal the law have failed. A large part of the reason for maintaining the laws has been a desire by many Bergen County residents for relative tranquility and less traffic on one day of the week. This desire for relative peace is most apparent in Paramus, where most of the county's largest shopping malls are located, along the intersecting highways of Route 4 and Route 17, which are jam-packed on many Saturdays. Paramus has enacted blue laws of its own that are even more restrictive than those enforced by Bergen County, banning all forms of "worldly employment" on Sundays, including white collar workers in office buildings. Despite these strict blue laws, Paramus (07652) has become the top retail ZIP Code in the United States, with the municipality generating over US$6 billion in annual retail sales. Local blue laws in Paramus were first proposed in 1957, while the Bergen Mall (since renamed as The Outlets at Bergen Town Center) and Garden State Plaza were under construction. The legislation was motivated by fears that the two new malls would aggravate the already severe highway congestion caused by local retail businesses along the borough's highways seven days a week and to preserve one day on which the roads were less congested. In November 2012, Governor Chris Christie issued an executive order to temporarily suspend the blue law due to the effects of Hurricane Sandy. The blue law was suspended on November 11 but was back in effect one week later.

=== Minimum wage ===
In November 2017, County Executive James Tedesco raised the minimum wage for full-time Bergen County workers to $15 per hour gradually increasing over a 6-year period, an increase from the prevailing state minimum wage at the time of $8.44 hourly. The raise constituted the first such hike in the minimum wage paid to employees of any New Jersey county.

== Parks and recreation ==
=== State parks ===
- Ramapo Mountain State Forest, Mahwah
- Palisades Interstate Park, Fort Lee, Englewood Cliffs, Tenafly, Alpine

=== State-owned historical sites ===
- New Bridge Landing, River Edge, Teaneck and New Milford
- The Hermitage, Ho-Ho-Kus
- Steuben House, River Edge (at New Bridge Landing)

=== County parks ===
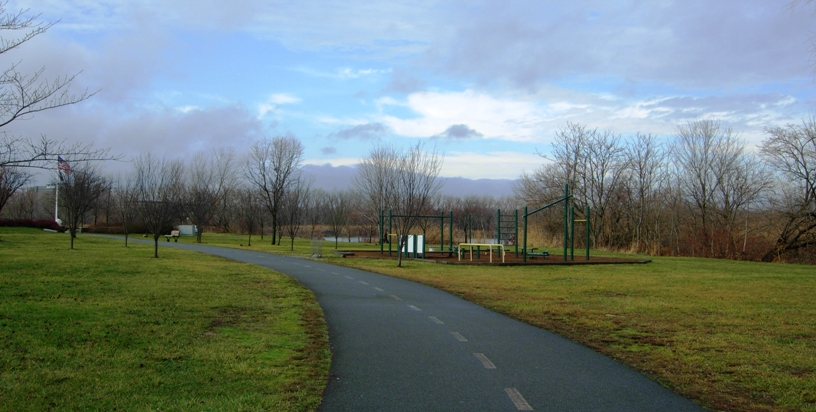
Overpeck County Park has several fields for various sports a turf football stadium with a track, a boat launch, and an amphitheater.

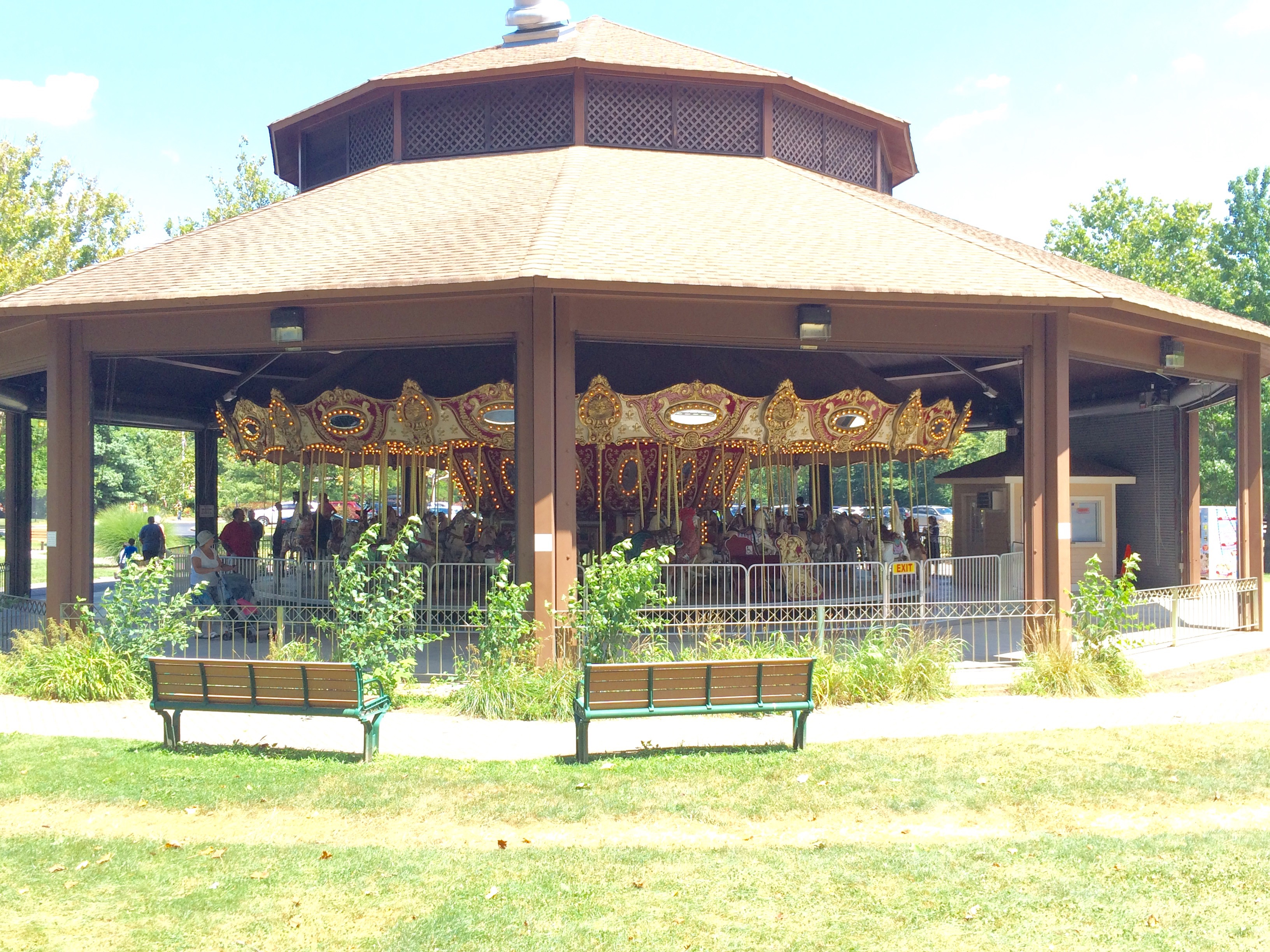
Van Saun County Park in Paramus features attractions including a train ride, a carousel, and a playground, as well as a zoological park.

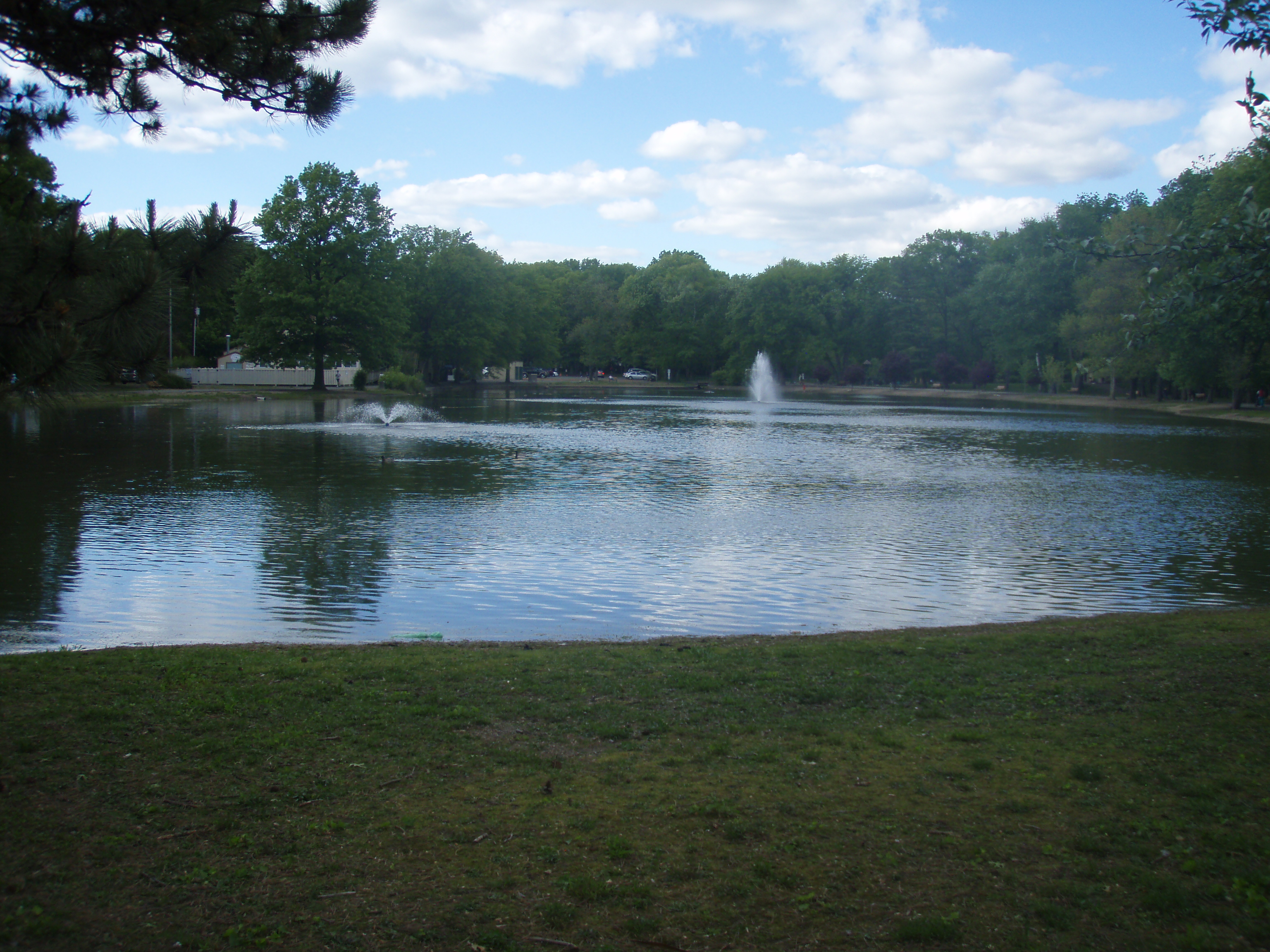
Saddle River County Park has a duck pond as well as many picnic areas, playgrounds, and many sports fields and courts.

- Bergen Equestrian Center, Leonia
- Belmont Hill County Park, Garfield
- Campgaw Mountain Reservation, Mahwah, offers activities including skiing, snowboarding and hiking in an area covering 1,373 acres (556 ha)
- Dahnert's Lake County Park, Garfield
- Darlington County Park, Mahwah
- McFaul Environmental Center, Wyckoff
- Ramapo Valley County Reservation, Mahwah
- Overpeck County Park, Leonia, Palisades Park, Ridgefield Park
- Riverside County Park, Lyndhurst, North Arlington
- Pascack Brook County Park, Westwood
- Saddle Ridge Riding Area, Franklin Lakes
- Saddle River County Park, Paramus, Glen Rock, Rochelle Park, Saddle Brook, Ridgewood
- Samuel Nelkin County Park, Wallington
- Van Saun County Park, Paramus, including the Bergen County Zoological Park, the county's only zoo. The zoo was slated for an expansion as of 2016 which would nearly double its size from 12 to 23 acres and significantly diversify its population of animal species.
- Wood Dale County Park, Woodcliff Lake

=== County-owned historical sites ===
Historical sits owned by Bergen County include:

- Baylor Massacre site, River Vale – location of a surprise attack on September 27, 1778, against the 3rd Regiment of Continental Light Dragoons under the command of Colonel George Baylor during the American Revolutionary War
- Camp Merritt, Cresskill
- Campbell-Christie House, River Edge – historic Dutch sandstone home that was moved from New Milford to preserve the home from destruction
- Easton Tower, Paramus
- Garretson Farm, Fair Lawn – stone home dating to the 1720s that is one of the county's oldest surviving structures
- Gethsemane Cemetery, Little Ferry
- Hackensack Water Company Complex, Oradell
- Washington Spring Garden, located in Van Saun Park, Paramus
- Wortendyke Barn, Park Ridge

== See also ==
- List of Registered Historic Places in Bergen County, New Jersey

== Sources ==
- Bogert, Frederick W. Bergen County, New Jersey, History and Heritage, Volume II, The Colonial Days, 1630–1775, Bergen County, N.J., The Bergen County Board of Chosen Freeholders, 1983.
- Cornelius Burnham Harvey (ed.), Genealogical History of Hudson and Bergen counties, New Jersey. New York: New Jersey Genealogical Publishing Co., 1900.
- W. Woodford Clayton with William Nelson, History of Bergen and Passaic Counties, New Jersey, with Biographical Sketches of Many of its Pioneers and Prominent Men. Philadelphia: Everts and Peck, 1882.
- James M. Van Valen, History of Bergen County, New Jersey. New York: New Jersey Publishing and Engraving Co., 1900.
- Westervelt, Frances A. History of Bergen County, New Jersey, 1630–1923. New York: Lewis Historical Publishing Co., 1923.
