= South Bergen Jointure Commission =

Special education school district in New Jersey

Address
- 696 Route 46 West Teterboro, Bergen County, New Jersey, 07608; United States
- Coordinates: 40.8692127°N 74.0654183°W

District information
- Grades: Special services
- Superintendent: Michael Kuchar
- Business administrator: Susan Cucciniello
- Schools: 3

Students and staff
- Enrollment: 311 (as of 2022–23)
- Faculty: 62.0 FTEs
- Student–teacher ratio: 5.0:1

Other information
- District Factor Group: NA
- Website: www.njsbjc.org

The South Bergen Jointure Commission is a special education public school district based in Hasbrouck Heights on New Jersey Route 17 South in Hasbrouck Heights, New Jersey near Teterboro Airport, serving the educational needs of classified students ages 3 to 21 who are autistic or multiply disabled from southern Bergen County, in the U.S. state of New Jersey.

As of the 2022–23 school year, the district, comprising three schools, had an enrollment of 311 students and 62.0 classroom teachers (on an FTE basis), for a student–teacher ratio of 5.0:1.

== Controversy ==
District Superintendent Dawn Fidanza resigned in October 2017 after the Office of Fiscal Accountability and Compliance of the New Jersey Department of Education found that she had transferred her daughter and created a new job position without the authorization of the district's board and had covered security cameras to conceal her daughter's actions in the district office. Described by The Record as "one of New Jersey's highest paid school superintendents", Fidanza had been paid an annual salary of $236,000.

== Schools ==
Schools in the district (with 2022-23 enrollment data from the National Center for Education Statistics.) are:

- East Rutherford Campus (Pre-K)
- Maywood Campus (174; PreK-5)
  - Scott Rossig, principal
- Lodi Middle School / High School (90 students; in grades 6-12)
  - Lauren N. Rosicki, principal
- Moonachie Campus (47; PreK-8)

== Administration ==
Core members of the district's administration are:

- Michael Kuchar, superintendent
- Susan Cucciniello, business administrator and board secretary

== Constituent districts ==
The district's board of education is comprised of representatives from the participating school districts:

- Bogota Public Schools (K–12)
- Carlstadt Public Schools (K–8)
- Carlstadt-East Rutherford Regional School District – Regional (9–12)
- East Rutherford School District (K–8)
- Garfield Public Schools (K–12)
- Hasbrouck Heights School District (K–12)
- Lodi Public Schools (K–12)
- Lyndhurst School District (K–12)
- Moonachie School District (K–8)
- North Arlington School District (K–12)
- Rutherford School District (K–12)
- South Hackensack School District (K–8)
- Wallington Public Schools (K–12)
- Wood-Ridge School District (K–12)
