= Carlstadt-East Rutherford Regional School District =

School district in Bergen County, New Jersey, US

Address
- 120 Paterson Avenue East Rutherford, Bergen County, New Jersey, 07073; United States
- Coordinates: 40.83257°N 74.094149°W

District information
- Grades: 9-12
- Superintendent: Dario Sforza
- Business administrator: Jessenia Kan
- Schools: 1

Students and staff
- Enrollment: 862 (as of 2023–24)
- Faculty: 61.5 FTEs
- Student–teacher ratio: 14.0:1

Other information
- District Factor Group: CD
- Website: www.bectonhs.org
| Ind. | Per pupil | District spending | Rank (*) | 9-12 average | %± vs. average |
|---|---|---|---|---|---|
| 1A | Total Spending | $25,994 | 43 | $18,891 | 37.6% |
| 1 | Budgetary Cost | 18,225 | 42 | 15,592 | 16.9% |
| 2 | Classroom Instruction | 10,600 | 44 | 8,807 | 20.4% |
| 6 | Support Services | 2,403 | 27 | 2,294 | 4.8% |
| 8 | Administrative Cost | 1,983 | 47 | 1,592 | 24.6% |
| 10 | Operations & Maintenance | 2,404 | 43 | 1,954 | 23.0% |
| 13 | Extracurricular Activities | 775 | 18 | 873 | −11.2% |
| 16 | Median Teacher Salary | 82,968 | 42 | 71,726 |
Data from NJDoE 2014 Taxpayers' Guide to Education Spending. *Of 9-12 districts with any number of students. Lowest spending=1; Highest=47

The Carlstadt-East Rutherford Regional School District is a regional public high school and school district serving students in ninth through twelfth grades from both Carlstadt and East Rutherford, two relatively small communities in Bergen County, in the U.S. state of New Jersey. Students from Maywood attend the district's high school as part of a sending/receiving relationship.

As of the 2023–24 school year, the district, comprised of one school, had an enrollment of 862 students and 61.5 classroom teachers (on an FTE basis), for a student–teacher ratio of 14.0:1.

The district had been classified by the New Jersey Department of Education as being in District Factor Group "CD", the sixth-highest of eight groupings. District Factor Groups organize districts statewide to allow comparison by common socioeconomic characteristics of the local districts. From lowest socioeconomic status to highest, the categories are A, B, CD, DE, FG, GH, I and J.

== History ==
After a fire destroyed half of the former East Rutherford High School in October 1966, efforts were made to create a regional high school district, which culminated with the passage of a referendum in June 1968.

The new high school was named in honor of Henry Becton, chairman of Becton, Dickinson and Company, who donated part of the company's original East Rutherford property to be used as a site for the construction of the school. Constructed on a 2.6-acre (1.1 ha) site, the building was designed to accommodate an enrollment of 1,100 students and was completed at a cost of $4.3 million (equivalent to $33.4 million in 2024)

The high school building opened in September 1971 with 800 students in attendance.

Starting in 2014, the district began discussions with the Wallington Public Schools for a proposal in which the 350 Wallington students attending Wallington High School would be added to the 500 already attending Becton Regional High School for grades 9-12. The consolidation would allow for Wallington High School to be reused for other purposes, avoids the need to build a new high school building and could allow for elimination of duplicate administrators.

In March 2020, the Maywood Public Schools received approval from the New Jersey Department of Education to end the relationship it had established with the Hackensack Public Schools in 1969 to send students to Hackensack High School. Maywood will begin transitioning incoming ninth graders to Henry P. Becton Regional High School beginning in the 2020–21 school year. The transition would be complete after the final group of twelfth graders graduates from Hackensack High School at the end of the 2023–24 school year. Maywood cited costs of nearly $14,800 per student in 2018 to send high-school students to Hackensack and an annual cost in excess of $15,000 under a proposed new three-year agreement, while Becton would start at a per-pupil cost of $10,500 in 2020–21 as part of a ten-year deal that would have a maximum cost per Maywood student of $11,800 in the final year of the agreement.

== School ==
Schools in the district (with 2023–24 enrollment from the National Center for Education Statistics) are:

- Henry P. Becton Regional High School (commonly referred to as "Becton") is located in East Rutherford and had 821 students in grades 9-12.
  - James Bononno, principal

== Administration ==
Core members of the district's / school's administration are:

- Dario Sforza, superintendent
- Jessenia Kan, school business administrator and board secretary

== Board of education ==
The district's board of education, comprised of ten members, sets policy and oversees the fiscal and educational operation of the district through its administration. As a Type II school district, the board's trustees are elected directly by voters to serve three-year terms of office on a staggered basis, with three seats up for election each year held (since 2012) as part of the November general election. The board appoints a superintendent to oversee the district's day-to-day operations and a business administrator to supervise the business functions of the district. Seats on the board of education are allocated based on the population of the constituent municipalities, with five seats allocated to East Rutherford, four to Carlstadt and one to Maywood.
