= South Hackensack School District =

School district in Bergen County, New Jersey, US

Address
- 1 Dyer Avenue South Hackensack, Bergen County, New Jersey, 07606; United States
- Coordinates: 40.8664°N 74.045809°W

District information
- Grades: PreK-8
- Superintendent: Letizia Pantoliano (interim)
- Business administrator: Emidio D'Andrea (interim)
- Schools: 1

Students and staff
- Enrollment: 265 (as of 2023–24)
- Faculty: 24.5 FTEs
- Student–teacher ratio: 10.8:1

Other information
- District Factor Group: CD
- Website: www.shmemorial.org
Ind.	Per pupil	District spending	Rank (*)	K-8 average	%± vs. average
1A	Total Spending	$23,282	59	$18,891	23.2%
1	Budgetary Cost	17,847	56	14,159	26.0%
2	Classroom Instruction	9,637	45	8,659	11.3%
6	Support Services	3,546	57	2,167	63.6%
8	Administrative Cost	1,513	24	1,547	−2.2%
10	Operations & Maintenance	2,810	61	1,612	74.3%
13	Extracurricular Activities	268	55	104	157.7%
16	Median Teacher Salary	68,608	66	61,136
Data from NJDoE 2014 Taxpayers' Guide to Education Spending. *Of K-8 districts with up to 400 students. Lowest spending=1; Highest=71

South Hackensack School District is a community public school district serving students in pre-kindergarten through eighth grade from South Hackensack, in Bergen County, in the U.S. state of New Jersey.

As of the 2023–24 school year, the district, comprised of one school, had an enrollment of 265 students and 24.5 classroom teachers (on an FTE basis), for a student–teacher ratio of 10.8:1.

Students in public school for ninth through twelfth grades attend Hackensack High School as part of a sending/receiving relationship with the Hackensack Public Schools, together with students from Rochelle Park. As of the 2023–24 school year, the high school had an enrollment of 1,726 students and 138.3 classroom teachers (on an FTE basis), for a student–teacher ratio of 12.5:1.

== History ==
The district had previously served students from Teterboro, who had attended the district as part of a sending/receiving relationship. Teterboro, a non-operating district was merged into the Hasbrouck Heights School District following its dissolution on July 1, 2010.

The district had been classified by the New Jersey Department of Education as being in District Factor Group "CD", the sixth-highest of eight groupings. District Factor Groups organize districts statewide to allow comparison by common socioeconomic characteristics of the local districts. From lowest socioeconomic status to highest, the categories are A, B, CD, DE, FG, GH, I and J.

== School ==
Memorial School had an enrollment of 249 students in grades PreK–8 as of the 2021–22 school year.

== Administration ==
Core members of the district's administration include:

- Letizia Pantoliano, interim superintendent and principal
- Emidio D'Andrea, interim business administrator and board secretary

== Board of education ==
The district's board of education is comprised of seven members who set policy and oversee the fiscal and educational operation of the district through its administration. As a Type II school district, the board's trustees are elected directly by voters to serve three-year terms of office on a staggered basis, with either two or three seats up for election each year held (since 2013) as part of the November general election. The board appoints a superintendent to oversee the district's day-to-day operations and a business administrator to supervise the business functions of the district.
