= Walt Szot =

American football player (1920–1981)

No. 36, 65, 89
- Position: Tackle

Personal information
- Born: March 30, 1920; Clifton, New Jersey, U.S.
- Died: November 3, 1981 (aged 61); Passaic, New Jersey, U.S.
- Listed height: 6 ft 1 in (1.85 m)
- Listed weight: 222 lb (101 kg)

Career information
- High school: East Rutherford (NJ); St. Benedict's (NJ)
- College: Bucknell
- NFL draft: 1944: 18th round, 176th overall pick

Career history
- Chicago Cardinals (1946–1948); Pittsburgh Steelers (1949–1950)

Awards and highlights
- NFL champion (1947)

Career NFL statistics
- Games played: 56
- Games started: 3
- Fumble recoveries: 2
- Stats at Pro Football Reference

Walter Stanley Szot (March 30, 1920 – November 3, 1981) was an American professional football tackle who played five seasons in the National Football League (NFL) with the Chicago Cardinals and Pittsburgh Steelers. He was drafted by the Chicago Cardinals in the 18th round of the 1944 NFL draft. He played prep football at East Rutherford High School in his hometown of East Rutherford, New Jersey and graduated from St. Benedict's Preparatory School, before playing college football for the Bucknell Bison.

== College career ==
Szot was a three-year starter for the Bucknell Bison. He was co-captain of the 1943 Bison team. He earned first-team all-state honors in 1943 while also garnering All-East and All-America recognition. Szot also earned second-team All-Pennsylvania honors in 1942. He was on the boxing team for one year and was president of the "B" Club his senior year. He was inducted into the Bucknell Hall of Fame in 1993.

== Professional career ==
Szot was selected by the Chicago Cardinals in the 18th round with the 176th pick in the 1944 NFL draft. He played in 33 games, starting one, for the Cardinals from 1946 to 1948.

Szot played in 23 games, starting two, for the Pittsburgh Steelers from 1949 to 1950.

== Personal life ==
Szot served in the United States Marine Corps for three years during World War II prior to joining the Chicago Cardinals. In 1951, Szot, a Marine reservist, was recalled to active duty during the Korean War.
