= Mary Help of Christians Academy (New Jersey) =

Catholic high school in Passaic County, New Jersey, United States

Location
- 659 Belmont Avenue; North Haledon, (Passaic County), New Jersey 07508; United States
- 40°56′48.59″N 74°11′20.06″W

Information
- Type: Private, All-Girls
- Motto: Beauty, Truth, and Joy
- Religious affiliation: Roman Catholic
- Established: 1941
- Founder: Salesian Sisters of St. John Bosco
- Status: Open
- CEEB code: 310485
- NCES School ID: 00866181
- Head of school: Kelly Schuster
- Faculty: 17.8 FTEs
- Grades: 9–12
- Enrollment: 154 (as of 2021–22)
- Student to teacher ratio: 8.7:1
- Campus size: 16 acres (65,000 m^{2})
- Slogan: The Future is Here
- Athletics conference: North Jersey Interscholastic Conference
- Sports: Basketball, Bowling, Cheerleading, Cross Country, Soccer, Softball, Tennis, Track & Field, Volleyball
- Team name: Blue Jays
- Accreditation: Middle States Association of Colleges and Schools
- School fees: $1,400
- Tuition: $14,995 (2023-24)
- Website: www.maryhelp.org

Mary Help of Christians Academy is an all-girls, Roman Catholic high school located in North Haledon, Passaic County, in the U.S. state of New Jersey, serving students in ninth through twelfth grades. Operated by the Salesian Sisters of St. John Bosco, the school is located in the Roman Catholic Diocese of Paterson, though the school is operated independently of the Diocese. Though the school was founded as an orphanage in 1921, it took its current identity as a Catholic high school in 1941, and has been accredited by the Middle States Association of Colleges and Schools Commission on Elementary and Secondary Schools since 1978.

As of the 2021–22 school year, the school had an enrollment of 154 students and 17.8 classroom teachers (on an FTE basis), for a student–teacher ratio of 8.7:1. The school's student body was 61.7% (95) White, 27.9% (43) Hispanic, 5.2% (8) Black, 3.9% (6) Asian and 1.3% (2) two or more races.

== History ==
Mary Help of Christians Academy, a Catholic preparatory school in the Salesian tradition, embraces the charism of reason, religion and loving kindness as inspired by St. John Bosco and St. Mary Mazzarello. The school was founded as an orphanage and later became a boarding school for young women. It is situated on a 16.33-acre (6.61 ha) tract of land that was known as the Muhs Estate on Belmont Avenue in North Haledon. In 1921, the Muhs Estate was sold by its owner to the Salesian Sisters of St. John Bosco of the Eastern Province, and in 1924, Mary Help of Christians Academy opened its doors. The academy was established with 76 boarding students and 5 day students, most of whom were orphans. At present, Mary Help of Christians Academy is a comprehensive college preparatory day school, which offers Advanced Placement courses, dual enrollment college credit bearing courses, and specialized internships in a variety of career fields.

The academy hosts summer programs for younger children in which students at the academy volunteer their time as camp counselors.

== Athletics ==
The Mary Help of Christians Blue Jays participate in the North Jersey Interscholastic Conference, which comprises small-enrollment schools in Bergen, Hudson, Morris and Passaic counties, and was created following a reorganization of sports leagues in Northern New Jersey by the New Jersey State Interscholastic Athletic Association (NJSIAA). Prior to the realignment that took effect in the fall of 2010, MHCA spent one year as a member of the smaller Bergen County Scholastic League (BCSL). With 198 students in grades 10–12, the school was classified by the NJSIAA for the 2019–20 school year as Non-Public B for most athletic competition purposes, which included schools with an enrollment of 37 to 366 students in that grade range (equivalent to Group I for public schools).

Sports offered at Mary Help include basketball, bowling, cheerleading, dance team, soccer, softball, tennis and volleyball.
