= East Rutherford High School =

Defunct high school in Bergen County, New Jersey, US

Coordinates: 40.8319°N 74.0932°W

East Rutherford High School was a public high school that operated as part of the East Rutherford School District in East Rutherford, in Bergen County, in the U.S. state of New Jersey.

== History ==
The district's initial high school program began in 1896, with the first graduate completing their program two years later. The school had served students from Carlstadt on a tuition basis until its closure and the opening of the joint regional high school. Students from Wallington had attended the school as part of a sending/receiving relationship until the opening of Wallington High School in 1951.

The school building was partially destroyed in an October 1966 fire that destroyed half of the space used by the high school.

The school closed at the end of the 1970–71 school year, was succeeded by Henry P. Becton Regional High School, which was built to serve students from both East Rutherford and Carlstadt.

== Athletics ==
The boys cross country running team won the Group B state championship in 1929 and 1930.

In 1933, the girls' basketball team won its 100th consecutive game, continuing a streak that started with the final game of the 1927 season.

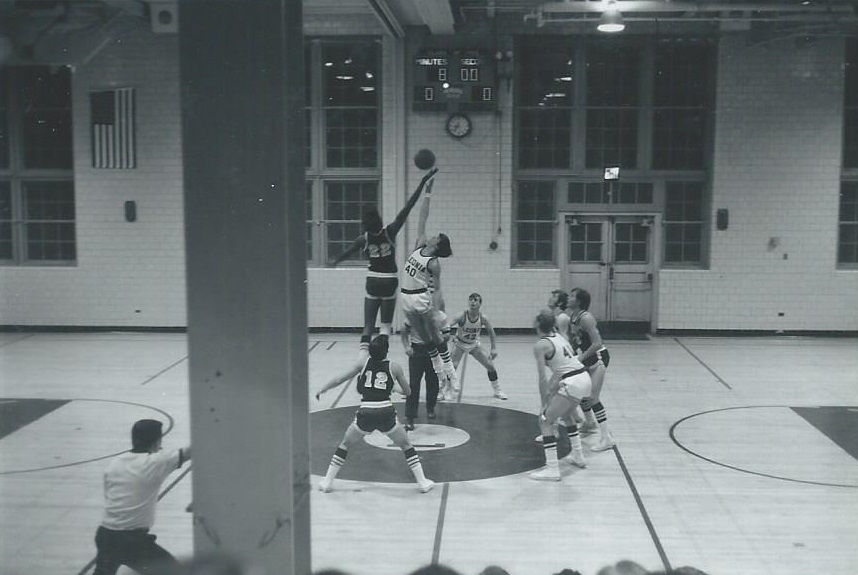
Les Cason (dark uniform at center) wins the opening tip against Leonia High School in a January 1971 game

The boys' basketball team, coached by Dick Vitale, won the Group I state championship in 1970 (defeating Burlington Township High School in the tournament final) and 1971 (vs. Gloucester City High School). Les Cason set a tournament record with 45 points to lead the 1970 team to a 67–66 win against Burlington Township in the Group I championship game at a game played in Boardwalk Hall in Atlantic City. Cason broke the record of 40 points that had been held by Brian Taylor of Perth Amboy High School. The 1971 team, which also starred Cason, finished the season with a record of 28–0 after winning the program's second consecutive Group I state title with a 53–52 defeat of Gloucester City in the playoff finals. Cason was recruited by over 300 colleges, but a combination of academic problems and other issues rendered him ineffective at the collegiate level; eventually he became addicted to drugs and died at age 43.

== Notable alumni ==
- Carol Arthur (1935–2020), actress, known for playing supporting roles in films produced by Mel Brooks.
- Ernest Cuneo (1905–1988), lawyer, newspaperman, author and intelligence liaison, who played two seasons in the NFL for the Orange Tornadoes and the Brooklyn Dodgers.
- Steve Hamas (1907–1974), professional football player in the National Football League who turned to professional boxing, defeating former heavyweight champions Tommy Loughran and Max Schmelling.
- Henry Helstoski (1925–1999, class of 1940), politician who served in the United States House of Representatives for 12 years, from 1965 until 1977.
- Harold C. Hollenbeck (born 1938), politician who represented New Jersey's 9th congressional district in the United States House of Representatives from 1977 to 1983.
- Robert P. Hollenbeck (1931–2021), politician who served six terms in the New Jersey General Assembly from the 36th Legislative District.
- C. Gus Rys (1912–1980), politician who was mayor of Fair Lawn and served three terms in the New Jersey General Assembly.
- Walt Szot (1920–1981), American football tackle who played five seasons in the National Football League with the Chicago Cardinals and Pittsburgh Steelers.
- Vito Trause (1925–2019), World War II United States Army veteran and prisoner of war
- Dick Vitale (born 1939), basketball coach and sportscaster who coached the East Rutherford basketball team to two state titles.
