= Bergen County Scholastic League =

Defunct high school athletic league in New Jersey

The Bergen County Scholastic League (BCSL) was a New Jersey high school sports association under the jurisdiction of the New Jersey State Interscholastic Athletic Association (NJSIAA). The conference consisted of thirty public and parochials high schools covering Bergen County and Hudson County in northern New Jersey. These schools were grouped into three divisions, according to the state classification given by the NJSIAA. The three divisions were the American, mostly made up of Group II schools, and National and Olympic, which were mostly made up of Group I schools. After a decision by the NJSIAA in February 2008, Hawthorne Christian Academy and Saddle River Day School were added into the BCSL Olympic Division starting as of September 2008.

Beginning in the 2010-2011 school year, the American Division was annexed into the newly created Big North Conference, while the National and Olympic Divisions were annexed into the new North Jersey Interscholastic Conference.

== Sports ==
- Fall Sports: Cross Country*, Football, Girls' Tennis, Soccer*, Volleyball
- Winter Sports: Basketball*, Swimming*, Track & Field*, Wrestling, Bowling*
- Spring Sports: Baseball, Boys' Tennis, Golf*, Softball, Track & Field*

(*)Sports offered to both boys and girls.

== BCSL American ==
School	Location	Team Name	Classification
Cliffside Park High School	Cliffside Park	Red Raiders	North II, Group 2
Dumont High School	Dumont	Huskies	North I, Group 2
Dwight Morrow High School	Englewood	Maroon Raiders	North I, Group 3
Fort Lee High School	Fort Lee	Bridgemen	North I, Group 3
Mahwah High School	Mahwah	Thunderbirds	North I, Group 2
Queen of Peace High School	North Arlington	Golden Griffins	Non-Public North A
Ridgefield Park High School	Ridgefield Park	Scarlets	North II, Group 2
River Dell Regional High School	Oradell	Golden Hawks	North I, Group 2
Rutherford High School	Rutherford	Bulldogs	North II, Group 2
Tenafly High School	Tenafly	Tigers	North I, Group 2
Westwood Regional High School	Westwood	Cardinals	North I, Group 2

== BCSL National ==
School	Location	Team Name	Classification
Henry P. Becton Regional High School	East Rutherford	Wildcats	North II, Group 1
Harrison High School	Harrison	Blue Tide	North II, Group 1
Hasbrouck Heights High School	Hasbrouck Heights	Aviators	North I, Group 1
Lyndhurst High School	Lyndhurst	Golden Bears	North II, Group 1
North Arlington High School	North Arlington	Vikings	North II, Group 1
Secaucus High School	Secaucus	Patriots	North II, Group 1
St. Mary's High School	Rutherford	Gaels	Non-Public North B
Wallington High School	Wallington	Panthers	North I, Group 1
Weehawken High School	Weehawken	Indians	North II, Group 1
Wood-Ridge High School	Wood-Ridge	Blue Devils	North I, Group 1

== BCSL Olympic ==
School	Location	Team Name	Classification
Hawthorne Christian Academy	Hawthorne	Defenders	Non-Public
Bogota High School	Bogota	Buccaneers	North I, Group 1
Cresskill High School	Cresskill	Cougars	North I, Group 1
Dwight-Englewood School	Englewood	Bulldogs	Non-Public North B
Emerson High School	Emerson	Cavaliers	North I, Group 1
Leonia High School	Leonia	Lions	North I, Group 1
New Milford High School	New Milford	Knights	North I, Group 1
Palisades Park High School	Palisades Park	Tigers	North I, Group 1
Park Ridge High School	Park Ridge	Owls	North I, Group 1
Ridgefield Memorial High School	Ridgefield	Royals	North II, Group 1
Saddle River Day School	Saddle River	Rebels
