= Palisades Park High School =

High school in Bergen County, New Jersey, US

Location
- 1 Veterans Plaza; Palisades Park, Bergen County, New Jersey 07650; United States; 40.838602°N 73.994198°W

Information
- Type: Public high school
- School district: Palisades Park Public School District
- NCES School ID: 341236000682
- Principal: Nicholas Cipriano
- Faculty: 52.6 FTEs
- Grades: 7–12
- Enrollment: 736 (as of 2023–24)
- Student to teacher ratio: 14.0:1
- Colors: Blue and white
- Athletics conference: North Jersey Interscholastic Conference
- Team name: Tigers
- Website: pphs.palpkschools.org

Palisades Park High School is a six-year comprehensive public high school that serves students in seventh through twelfth grades from Palisades Park, in Bergen County, in the U.S. state of New Jersey, operating as the lone secondary school of the Palisades Park Public School District.

As of the 2023–24 school year, the school had an enrollment of 736 students and 52.6 classroom teachers (on an FTE basis), for a student–teacher ratio of 14.0:1. There were 361 students (49.0% of enrollment) eligible for free lunch and 72 (9.8% of students) eligible for reduced-cost lunch.

== Awards, recognition and rankings ==
The school was the 282nd-ranked public high school in New Jersey out of 339 schools statewide in New Jersey Monthly magazine's September 2014 cover story on the state's "Top Public High Schools", using a new ranking methodology. The school had been ranked 253rd in the state of 328 schools in 2012, after being ranked 87th in 2010 out of 322 schools listed. The magazine ranked the school 118th in 2008 out of 316 schools. The school was ranked 133rd in the magazine's September 2006 issue, which surveyed 316 schools across the state. Schooldigger.com ranked the school as tied for 198th out of 376 public high schools statewide in its 2010 rankings (an increase of 33 positions from the 2009 rank) which were based on the combined percentage of students classified as proficient or above proficient on the language arts literacy and mathematics components of the High School Proficiency Assessment (HSPA).

== Athletics ==
The Palisades Park High School Tigers participate in the North Jersey Interscholastic Conference, which is comprised of small-enrollment public and private schools in Bergen, Hudson, Morris and Passaic counties, and was created following a reorganization of sports leagues in Northern New Jersey by the New Jersey State Interscholastic Athletic Association (NJSIAA). Prior to realignment that took effect in the fall of 2010, Palisades Park was a member of the Bergen County Scholastic League (BCSL). With 332 students in grades 10-12, the school was classified by the NJSIAA for the 2019–20 school year as Group I for most athletic competition purposes, which included schools with an enrollment of 75 to 476 students in that grade range. The school's co-op football team was classified by the NJSIAA as Group IV North for football for 2024–2026, which included schools with 893 to 1,315 students.

The school participates as the host school / lead agency for a joint cooperative football team with Leonia High School, while Leonia is the host school for co-op girls soccer, boys / girls swimming and wrestling teams. These co-op programs operate under agreements scheduled to expire at the end of the 2023–24 school year.

The baseball team won the Group I state championship in 1976, defeating Bound Brook High School by a score of 3-2 in the tournament final.

The boys' wrestling team won the North I Group I state sectional championship in 1981, 1982 and 1991.

The 1991 football team finished the season with a 9-2 record after winning the NJSIAA North I Group I state sectional title with a 20-10 victory against Wallington High School in the championship game.

The boys cross country running team won the Group I state championship in 1995, 1996 and 2000. The team has won North I Group I state sectional championships in 1976, 1987, 1994-2000 and in 2002, with the team's 10 sectional titles being the second most of any high school in North Jersey I. The 2000 team was awarded honors from The Star-Ledger as team of the year, with Frank Donohue earning Coach of the Year, with the paper noting the team's seven consecutive sectional titles. They have also won numerous State Sectional and County Group titles. Donohie was recognized by The Record as its Coach of the Year in 2004. The team held a 70–0 dual meet winning streak through part of the 1990s and into the 2000s.

The girls cross country running team won the Group I state championship in 2004.

In 2006, the boys' basketball team won their first BCSL Olympic League title since 1980, finishing with a league-best 13–3 record (17–6 overall record). With just one senior in the starting lineup on the 2006 championship squad, the team would go on to win back-to-back Olympic League titles in 2009 and 2010.

In 2007, the boys' tennis team won their first state sectional title, defeating Leonia High School 3–2 to win the North I, Group I championship. They have gone down in history for being the first to ever win a State Sectionals Title for both boys and girls.

Palisades Park football, which is a co-op program with Leonia High School, made the state championship game in 2012 for North Jersey II Group III for the first time since 1991. Under the leadership of Head Coach David Schuman it was the first time a co-op program made the sectional finals in state history, with the team falling to Summit High School by a 30–0 final score. The team finished 9–3 which was the second most wins in school history. Coach Schuman was awarded NJIC coach of the year and the team finished ranked No. 12 in North Jersey by The Record.

== Administration ==
The school's principal is Nicholas Cipriano.
