= North Jersey Interscholastic Conference =

The North Jersey Interscholastic Conference, or NJIC, is a high school athletic conference located in New Jersey. It is one of the so-called "super conferences" created by the New Jersey State Interscholastic Athletic Association (NJSIAA) as a part of a realignment of high school sports leagues in North and Central New Jersey announced in 2009. The conference is composed of small-enrollment schools.

A total of 36 public and private high schools are part of the NJIC. Most of the schools are located in Bergen County (27), with the rest in Passaic County (6) and Hudson County (3). Butler High School, in Morris County, was added starting in the 2018–19 school year.

== Formation ==
Increasing conflict over competitive imbalance in New Jersey high school sports leagues led to the formation of a committee to study the issue in 2008. The group proposed to disband the 11 athletic conferences in the northern part of the state and create six larger "super conferences".

After a lengthy series of meetings and revisions, final implementation of the plan took place with the start of the 2010–11 school year. In the northeast corner of New Jersey, two super conferences emerged: the Big North Conference for larger schools and the NJIC for smaller schools.

Almost all of the NJIC schools that originally joined the league were previously associated with either the Bergen County Scholastic League (BSCL) or Bergen-Passaic Scholastic League (B-PSL). The only exception was Pascack Hills High School of Montvale, which had been associated with the BCSL for football but had belonged to the North Bergen Interscholastic Athletic League (NBIL) for other sports. The BCSL schools that joined the league mostly came from its National and Olympic divisions, while Rutherford High School was the only member of the league's American division that did not join the Big North Conference.Paterson Catholic High School(a member of the B-PSL) closed in the spring of 2010 and therefore never joined the NJIC.

Three other schools—Hawthorne Christian, Mary Help of Christians and Saddle River Day—had been independent prior to the start of the realignment process. Hawthorne Christian and Saddle River Day were placed in the BCSL National/Olympic and Mary Help of Christians Academy was placed in the B-PSL as a transitional step before the NJIC began play.

In 2011-12, Pascack Hills left to join the rest of the former NBIL schools in the Big North for all sports. Several years later, the league added Butler High School from the Northwest Jersey Athletic Conference.

== Member schools ==
=== Bergen County public schools ===
School	Location	Team Name
Becton Regional High School	East Rutherford	Wildcats
Bergen Arts and Science Charter School	Garfield, New Jersey	Yellowjackets
Bogota High School	Bogota	Buccaneers
Cresskill High School	Cresskill	Cougars
Elmwood Park Memorial High School	Elmwood Park	Crusaders
Emerson High School	Emerson	Cavaliers
Garfield High School	Garfield	Boilermakers
Glen Rock High School	Glen Rock	Panthers
Hasbrouck Heights High School	Hasbrouck Heights	Aviators
Leonia High School	Leonia	Lions
Lodi High School	Lodi	Rams
Lyndhurst High School	Lyndhurst	Golden Bears
Midland Park High School	Midland Park	Panthers
New Milford High School	New Milford	Knights
North Arlington High School	North Arlington	Vikings
Palisades Park High School	Palisades Park	Tigers
Park Ridge High School	Park Ridge	Owls
Ridgefield Memorial High School	Ridgefield	Royals
Rutherford High School	Rutherford	Bulldogs
Saddle Brook High School	Saddle Brook	Falcons
Waldwick High School	Waldwick	Warriors
Wallington High School	Wallington	Panthers
Wood-Ridge High School	Wood-Ridge	Blue Devils

=== Bergen County non-public schools ===
School	Location	Team Name
Dwight-Englewood School	Englewood	Bulldogs
Immaculate Conception High School	Lodi	Blue Wolves
Saddle River Day School	Saddle River	Rebels
St. Mary High School	Rutherford	Gaels

=== Hudson County Public Schools ===
School	Location	Team Name
Harrison High School	Harrison	Blue Tide
Secaucus High School	Secaucus	Patriots
Weehawken High School	Weehawken	Indians

=== Morris County public schools ===
School	Location	Team Name
Butler High School	Butler	Bulldogs

=== Passaic County public schools ===
School	Location	Team Name
Hawthorne High School	Hawthorne	Bears
Manchester Regional High School	Haledon	Falcons
Pompton Lakes High School	Pompton Lakes	Cardinals

=== Passaic County Non-Public Schools ===
School	Location	Team Name
Eastern Christian High School	North Haledon	Eagles
Hawthorne Christian Academy	Hawthorne	Defenders
Mary Help of Christians Academy	North Haledon	Blue Jays

== Sports offered ==
=== Fall sports ===
- Cross Country
- Football
- Soccer
- Tennis (Girls)
- Volleyball (Girls)

=== Winter sports ===
- Basketball
- Bowling
- Swimming
- Track & Field
- Wrestling

=== Spring sports ===
- Baseball
- Golf
- Softball
- Tennis (Boys)
- Track & Field

== Conference Divisions ==
The NJIC is divided into four divisions, largely along geographic and enrollment lines. Divisional alignments are reviewed every 2-year scheduling cycle by the conference. Because not all conference members participate in bowling, cross-country, football, golf, tennis and wrestling, different divisional alignments exist for those sports. Football and wrestling are sports specific and do not fall into the traditional divisional alignments.

=== Colonial Division ===
- Elmwood Park
- Garfield
- Glen Rock
- Lodi
- Rutherford
- Eastern Christian
- Hawthorne
- Manchester
- Pompton Lakes
- Mary Help of Christians

=== Meadowlands Division ===
- Becton
- Hasbrouck Heights
- Immaculate Conception
- North Arlington
- Saddle Brook
- St. Mary
- Wallington
- Weehawken
- Wood-Ridge

=== Patriot Division ===
- Bogota
- Cresskill
- Emerson
- Hawthorne Christian
- Midland Park
- Palisades Park
- Park Ridge
- Saddle River Day
- Waldwick
