= Rutherford School District =

Public school district in Bergen County, New Jersey, US

Address
- 176 Park Avenue Rutherford, Bergen County, New Jersey, 07070; United States
- Coordinates: 40.825688°N 74.108637°W

District information
- Grades: PreK-12
- Superintendent: Jack Hurley
- Business administrator: Matt Whitford
- Schools: 5

Students and staff
- Enrollment: 2,544 (as of 2023–24)
- Faculty: 225.5 FTEs
- Student–teacher ratio: 11.3:1

Other information
- District Factor Group: GH
- Website: www.rutherfordschools.org
| Ind. | Per pupil | District spending | Rank (*) | K-12 average | %± vs. average |
|---|---|---|---|---|---|
| 1A | Total Spending | $17,477 | 25 | $18,891 | −7.5% |
| 1 | Budgetary Cost | 13,152 | 21 | 14,783 | −11.0% |
| 2 | Classroom Instruction | 8,052 | 32 | 8,763 | −8.1% |
| 6 | Support Services | 1,708 | 10 | 2,392 | −28.6% |
| 8 | Administrative Cost | 1,522 | 34 | 1,485 | 2.5% |
| 10 | Operations & Maintenance | 1,577 | 31 | 1,783 | −11.6% |
| 13 | Extracurricular Activities | 277 | 9 | 268 | 3.4% |
| 16 | Median Teacher Salary | 67,214 | 49 | 64,043 |
Data from NJDoE 2014 Taxpayers' Guide to Education Spending. *Of K-12 districts with 1,800-3,500 students. Lowest spending=1; Highest=68

The Rutherford School District is a comprehensive community public school district that serves students in pre-kindergarten through twelfth grade from Rutherford, in Bergen County, in the U.S. state of New Jersey.

As of the 2023–24 school year, the district, comprised of five schools, had an enrollment of 2,544 students and 225.5 classroom teachers (on an FTE basis), for a student–teacher ratio of 11.3:1.

== History ==
Public education began in Rutherford prior to 1900, but the oldest permanent school structure was the Park School, built in 1902 on Park Avenue. In 1938, the former Park Junior High School was purchased for $50,000 and converted for use as Rutherford borough hall.

Rutherford formerly had three "neighborhood" schools for grades K-5 (Washington, Lincoln, and Sylvan) which fed into two "magnet" schools for 6-8 (Union and Pierrepont). The magnet schools also served as elementary schools for their neighborhoods. Since the 2005–06 school year, the Rutherford Schools have changed this format.

Sylvan School has since been closed by the Rutherford Board of Education; it houses YMCA programs, the district's special services department, as well as a handicapped pre-school program run by the South Bergen Jointure Commission.

Rutherford had two elementary schools, Washington and Lincoln, for grades K–3, while for grades 4–8, students attended Union and Pierrepont Schools. As part of the realignment that became effective for the 2015–16 school year which shifted Pierrepont to serve grades 4–6 and grades 7–8 at Union School, the Rutherford school system underwent a multimillion-dollar renovation, which effected all of its buildings, with the most substantial amount of work taking place at Washington, Lincoln and Union schools.

The district had been classified by the New Jersey Department of Education as being in District Factor Group "GH", the third-highest of eight groupings. District Factor Groups organize districts statewide to allow comparison by common socioeconomic characteristics of the local districts. From lowest socioeconomic status to highest, the categories are A, B, CD, DE, FG, GH, I and J.

== Schools ==
Schools in the district (with 2023–24 enrollment data from the National Center for Education Statistics) are:

Elementary schools

- Lincoln School with 484 students in grades PreK–3
  - Jeanna Velechko, principal
- Washington School with 319 students in grades 1–3
  - Jessica Saxon, principal
- Pierrepont School with 568 students in grades 4–6
  - Joan Carrion, principal
- Union School with 384 students in grades 7–8
  - Kurt Schweitzer, principal

High school

- Rutherford High School with 736 students in grades 9–12, built in 1922 and expanded in 1959 and 2005
  - Frank Morano, principal

== Administration ==
Core members of the district's administration are:

- Jack Hurley, superintendent
- Matt Whitford, business administrator and board secretary

== Board of education ==
The district's board of education, comprised of nine members, sets policy and oversees the fiscal and educational operation of the district through its administration. As a Type II school district, the board's trustees are elected directly by voters to serve three-year terms of office on a staggered basis, with three seats up for election each year held (since 2013) as part of the November general election. The board appoints a superintendent to oversee the district's day-to-day operations and a business administrator to supervise the business functions of the district.
