= Bergen Arts and Science Charter School =

Charter school in Bergen County, New Jersey, US

Bergen Arts and Science Charter School Elementary

Location
- 200 MacArthur Avenue; Garfield, (Bergen County), New Jersey 07026; United States
- 40.8741°N 74.0985°W

Information
- Type: Charter
- Established: 2007
- NCES School ID: 340071502923
- Principal: Guvercin
- Faculty: 88.0 FTEs
- Grades: K–12
- Enrollment: 1,280 (as of 2023–24)
- Average class size: 20-24
- Student to teacher ratio: 14.6:1
- Classes offered: Math, Science, English, Character Education, Spanish, Turkish, Physical Education, Art, Music
- Colors: Black yellow and white
- Athletics: Volleyball, cross country, softball, soccer, basketball, baseball
- Team name: Yellow Jackets

Bergen Arts and Science Charter School
- 200 MacArthur Avenue; Garfield, NJ 07026

District information
- Grades: K–12
- Superintendent: Christopher Lessard

Other information
- Website: ilearnschools.org/bergen-arts-science-charter-school
Ind.	Per pupil	District spending	Rank (*)	Charter average	%± vs. average
1A	Total Spending	$15,238	27	$18,047	−15.6%
1	Budgetary Cost	12,375	30	13,238	−6.5%
2	Classroom Instruction	6,728	29	7,328	−8.2%
6	Support Services	1,678	45	1,661	1.0%
8	Administrative Cost	2,448	45	2,563	−4.5%
10	Operations & Maintenance	1,520	38	1,661	−8.5%
16	Median Teacher Salary	44,700	19	50,669
Data from NJDoE 2013 Taxpayers' Guide to Education Spending. *Of Charter districts with any number of students. Lowest spending=1; Highest=77

Bergen Arts and Science Charter School (BASCS/Bergen ASCS) is a public charter school based in Garfield, New Jersey, United States. The school is a part of the North Jersey Arts and Science Charter Schools. The network consists of Bergen-ASCS Elementary in Garfield, Bergen-ASCS Middle High in Hackensack, and Passaic-ASCS Elementary and Building #2 in Passaic.

The school opened in September 2007 for grades K–5 and added a new grade every year until it reached the 12th grade. In 2011, it expanded with the establishment of the Bergen Arts and Science Charter School Middle High in Hackensack and Passaic Arts and Science School in Passaic. After the expansion was complete, Bergen Arts and Science Charter School moved its 7th and 8th grade to Bergen Arts and Science Charter School Middle High.

As of the 2023–24 school year, the school had an enrollment of 1,280 students and 88.0 classroom teachers (on an FTE basis), for a student-teacher ratio of 14.6:1. There were 528 students (41.3% of enrollment) eligible for free lunch and 198 (15.5% of students) eligible for reduced-cost lunch.

== Expansion ==
In 2011, BASCS expanded into two new schools: BASCS Middle High and Passaic Arts and Science Charter School, bringing the charter's total number of schools to three. Both BASCS Middle High and Passaic Arts and Science Charter School began operating in the 2011–12 school year.

As of March 2020, the charter had a total of six schools: one in Clifton, three in Garfield, one in Hackensack, three in Passaic, two in Paterson, and three in Hudson.

== Athletics ==
The mascot of BASCS is the Yellow Jacket. Athletically, the school participates in the North Jersey Interscholastic Conference, which is comprised of small-enrollment schools in Bergen, Hudson, Morris and Passaic counties and was created following a reorganization of sports leagues in Northern New Jersey by the New Jersey State Interscholastic Athletic Association (NJSIAA).

In the 2015–16 school year, the school had 187 students in grades 10–12. As such, the NJSIAA classified the school as North I Group I, a group that included schools with an enrollment of 187 to 490 students in that grade range, for most athletic competition purposes.
