= Walter G. Schroeder =

American politician

Member of the Oregon House of Representatives from the 48th district
- In office 1985–1993

Personal details
- Born: October 20, 1927 Hackensack, New Jersey, U.S.
- Died: November 9, 2021 (aged 94) Dallas, Oregon, U.S.
- Party: Republican
- Spouse: Sally M. Hartz (m. 1953)
- Education: University of Wisconsin–Madison (MS)

Walter G. Schroeder (October 20, 1927 – November 9, 2021) was an American politician who was a member of the Oregon House of Representatives from 1985 to 1993.

Schroeder was born in Hackensack, New Jersey and was raised in nearby Lyndhurst and then Maywood, where he attended Bogota High School.

He attended Rutgers University for two years before transferring Oregon State College, where he received a Bachelor of Science degree. He then served overseas in Germany during the Korean War, before returning to America and attending the University of Wisconsin–Madison where he earned a Master of Science degree. He served as the Curry County, Oregon staff chair from 1977 to 1983.

Schroeder died on November 9, 2021, in Dallas, Oregon.
