= Wallington High School =

High school in Bergen County, New Jersey, US

Wallington Jr./Sr. High School
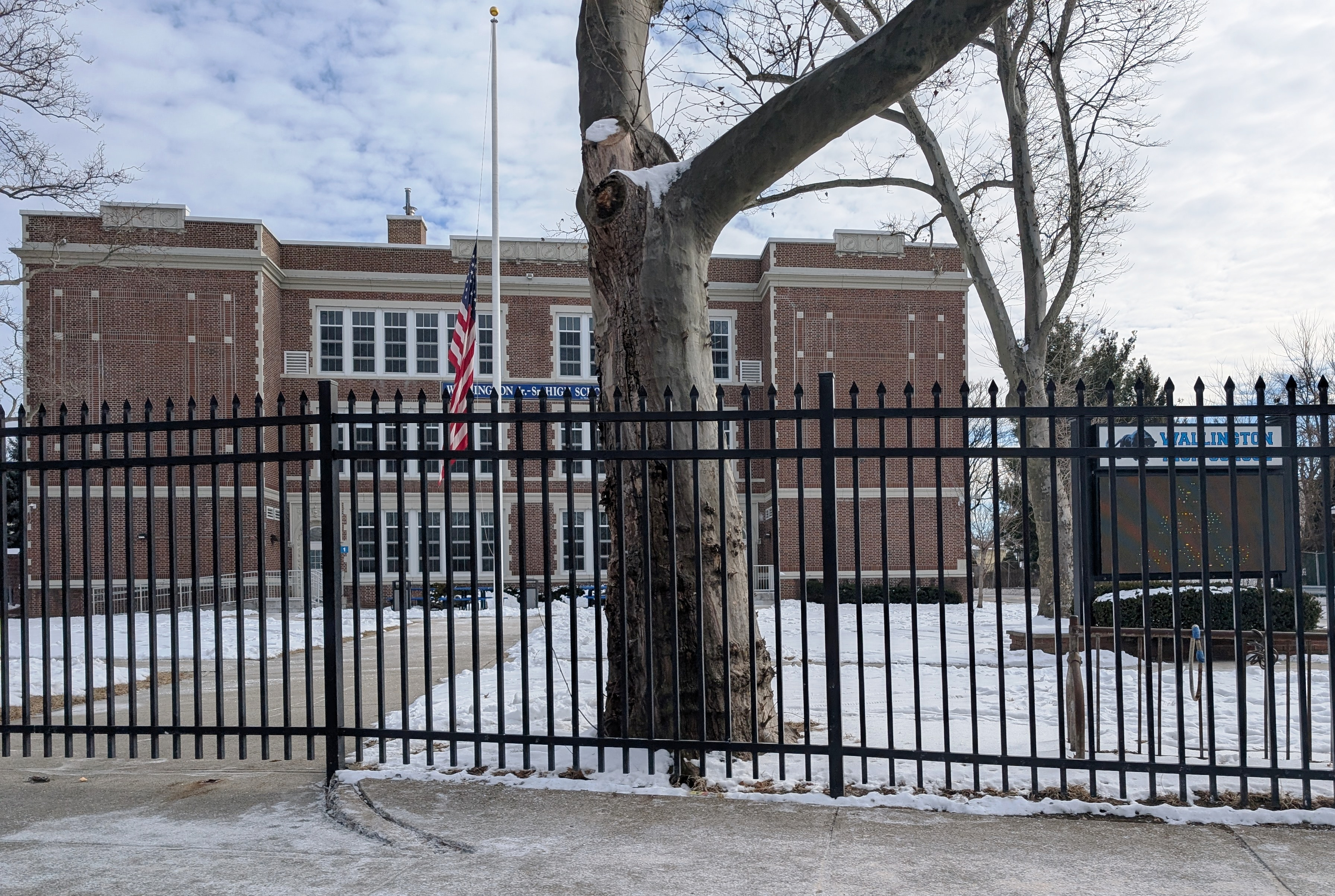

Location
- 234 Main Avenue; Wallington, Bergen County, New Jersey 07057; United States
- Coordinates: 40.855443°N 74.107702°W

Information
- Type: Public high school
- Established: 1951
- School district: Wallington Public Schools
- NCES School ID: 341692000898
- Principal: Michael Fromfield
- Faculty: 40.3 FTEs
- Grades: 7-12
- Enrollment: 566 (as of 2023–24)
- Student to teacher ratio: 14:1
- Colors: Royal Blue and white
- Athletics conference: North Jersey Interscholastic Conference
- Team name: Panthers
- Rival: Henry P. Becton Regional High School
- Newspaper: Wallington Courier
- Website: www.wboe.org/o/whs

Wallington Jr./Sr. High School is a six-year comprehensive public high school that serves students in seventh through twelfth grades from Wallington, in Bergen County, in the U.S. state of New Jersey, operating as the lone secondary school of the Wallington Public Schools.

As of the 2023–24 school year, the school had an enrollment of 566 students and 40.3 classroom teachers (on an FTE basis), for a student–teacher ratio of 14.0:1. There were 158 students (27.9% of enrollment) eligible for free lunch and 47 (8.3% of students) eligible for reduced-cost lunch.

== History ==
Before the opening of the high school, students from Wallington had attended East Rutherford High School as part of a sending/receiving relationship with the East Rutherford School District under which tuition was paid for students attendance.

The new high school opened in September 1951 for students in ninth grade. Students who had already been enrolled at East Rutherford High School or Lodi High School completed their education at the receiving school through their graduation.

The school, said to have the state's largest gymnasium at 116 by 72 feet (35 by 22 m), was formally dedicated in November 1951.

== Awards, recognition and rankings ==
The school was the 223rd-ranked public high school in New Jersey out of 339 schools statewide in New Jersey Monthly magazine's September 2014 cover story on the state's "Top Public High Schools", using a new ranking methodology. The school had been ranked 239th in the state of 328 schools in 2012, after being ranked 204th in 2010 out of 322 schools listed. The magazine ranked the school 200th in 2008 out of 316 schools. The school was ranked 206th in the magazine's September 2006 issue, which surveyed 316 schools across the state.

== Athletics ==
The Wallington High School Panthers participate in the North Jersey Interscholastic Conference, which is comprised of small-enrollment schools in Bergen, Hudson, Morris and Passaic counties, and was established following a reorganization of sports leagues in Northern New Jersey by the New Jersey State Interscholastic Athletic Association (NJSIAA). Prior to realignment that took effect in the fall of 2010, the school was a member of the Bergen County Scholastic League (BCSL) in the National Division. With 264 students in grades 10-12, the school was classified by the NJSIAA for the 2019–20 school year as Group I for most athletic competition purposes, which included schools with an enrollment of 75 to 476 students in that grade range. The school was classified by the NJSIAA as Group I North for football for 2024–2026, which included schools with 254 to 474 students.

The school participates in joint girls soccer and boys tennis teams with Henry P. Becton Regional High School as the host school / lead agency. These co-op programs operate under agreements scheduled to expire at the end of the 2023–24 school year.

The 1986 girls volleyball team finished the season with a 20–2 record after winning the Group I state championship, defeating runner-up Bogota High School in two games (15–13 and 15–12) in the final match of the tournament.

Under Hall of Fame coach Leonard J. Smith, the Panthers 1959 football team finished the season undefeated with a record of 7–0–1 and were awarded the North I, Group I state championship. In the playoff era, the team has won the North I Group I state sectional championship in 1990 and 2010. The team won the 1990 North I Group I sectional title with a 28–22 win in the championship game against Cresskill High School. The team won the 2010 North I Group I sectional championship, beating Mountain Lakes High School by a score of 23–21 at New Meadowlands Stadium. The defeat ended a 35-game winning streak for Mountain Lakes, at the time the longest such streak in New Jersey. Wallington has maintained a rivalry with Henry P. Becton Regional High School since the two schools first played each other in 1973, which was listed by The Record as one of the best in Bergen and Passaic counties; through the 2017 season, Becton leads with a 15–5 record in games between the two schools.

The boys' soccer team won the 2009 North I, Group I state sectional title with a 4–0 win vs. Leonia High School. The team won the 2010 North I, Group I state sectional tournament for a second consecutive year with a 2–1 win over Midland Park High School. The soccer team went on to win the Group I state championship, the first for the team in school history, with a win in the tournament finals against South River High School by a score of 1–0.

== Administration ==
The school's principal is Michael Fromfield. His core administration team includes the vice principal.

== Notable alumni ==
- Ralph Kirchenheiter (born c. 1939 or 1940, class of 1957), former head football coach and athletic director for Muhlenberg College
- Nick Zielonka (born 2002), professional soccer player who plays as a forward for New York Cosmos in the USL League One
