= Wallington Public Schools =

School district in Bergen County, New Jersey, US

Address
- 234 Main Ave Wallington, Bergen County, New Jersey, 07057; United States
- Coordinates: 41.696098°N 72.799248°W

District information
- Grades: PreK-12
- Superintendent: Yvette Lozanski
- Business administrator: Jody Pietrowitz
- Schools: 3

Students and staff
- Enrollment: 1,232 (as of 2024–25)
- Faculty: 88.6 FTEs
- Student–teacher ratio: 13.9:1

Other information
- District Factor Group: B
- Website: www.wboe.org
Ind.	Per pupil	District spending	Rank (*)	K-12 average	%± vs. average
1A	Total Spending	$15,283	4	$18,891	−19.1%
1	Budgetary Cost	10,908	1	14,783	−26.2%
2	Classroom Instruction	5,817	1	8,763	−33.6%
6	Support Services	1,833	13	2,392	−23.4%
8	Administrative Cost	1,376	4	1,485	−7.3%
10	Operations & Maintenance	1,472	18	1,783	−17.4%
13	Extracurricular Activities	411	20	268	53.4%
Data from NJDoE 2014 Taxpayers' Guide to Education Spending. *Of K-12 districts with up to 1,800 students. Lowest spending=1; Highest=49

The Wallington Public Schools is a comprehensive community public school district that serves students in pre-kindergarten through twelfth grade from Wallington, in Bergen County, in the U.S. state of New Jersey.

As of the 2024–25 school year, the district, comprised of three schools, had an enrollment of 1,232 students and 88.6 classroom teachers (on an FTE basis), for a student–teacher ratio of 13.9:1.

== History ==
In 2014, the district began discussions with the Carlstadt-East Rutherford Regional School District under which the 350 Wallington students would be added to the 500 already attending Henry P. Becton Regional High School for grades 9–12. The consolidation would allow for Wallington High School to be reused for other purposes, avoiding the need to build a new high school building, and could allow for elimination of duplicate administrators.

The district had been classified by the New Jersey Department of Education as being in District Factor Group "B", the second lowest of eight groupings. District Factor Groups organize districts statewide to allow comparison by common socioeconomic characteristics of the local districts. From lowest socioeconomic status to highest, the categories are A, B, CD, DE, FG, GH, I and J.

== Schools ==
Schools in the district (with 2024–25 enrollment data from the National Center for Education Statistics) are:

Elementary schools

- Jefferson Elementary School with 253 students in grades K–2
  - Michael Luterzo, principal
- Frank W. Gavlak Elementary School with 361 students in grades 3–6
  - Alessandro Barchi, principal

High school

- Wallington High School with 545 students in grades 7–12
  - Michael Fromfield, principal

== Administration ==
Core members of the district's administration include:

- Yvette Lozanski, superintendent
- Jody Pietrowitz, business administrator and board secretary

== Board of education ==
The district's board of education, comprised of nine members, sets policy and oversees the fiscal and educational operation of the district through its administration. As a Type II school district, the board's trustees are elected directly by voters to serve three-year terms of office on a staggered basis, with three seats up for election each year held (since 2012) as part of the November general election. The board appoints a superintendent to oversee the district's day-to-day operations and a business administrator to supervise the business functions of the district.
