= E. J. Barthel =

American football player and coach (born 1985)

E.J. Barthel
Nebraska Cornhuskers
- Title: Running backs coach

Personal information
- Born: January 2, 1985 (age 41); Santa Cruz, California, U.S.
- Listed height: 5 ft 10 in (1.78 m)
- Listed weight: 240 lb (109 kg)

Career information
- High school: East Rutherford (NJ) Becton Regional
- College: Massachusetts
- NFL draft: 2009: undrafted

Career history

Playing
- Las Vegas Locomotives (2009)

Coaching
- Rutgers (2013-2014) Football Operations/Recruiting; Temple (2015) Director of player personnel; Penn State (2016) Recruiting coordinator; Albany (2017) Running backs coach; Howard (2018) Running backs coach; William & Mary (2019) Recruiting coordinator/running backs coach; Carolina Panthers (2020–2021) Offensive assistant; Carolina Panthers (2021) Scouting Intern; UConn (2022) Running backs coach; Nebraska (2023–present) Running backs coach

Awards and highlights
- UFL champion (2009)

Elijah J. "E. J." Barthel (born February 1, 1985) is an American former football fullback and current running backs coach for the Nebraska Cornhuskers. He was signed by the Las Vegas Locomotives as an undrafted free agent in 2009. He played college football at Massachusetts.

Barthel grew up in East Rutherford, New Jersey and attended Henry P. Becton Regional High School.

== College career ==
Barthel played his first three years at Rutgers University. He redshirted his Freshman year and was injured as a redshirt Freshman. His Sophomore year he played in 2 games. Barthel transferred to UMass, along with Tight end Brad Listorti, as a Junior and played in all 15 games, starting 3. He rushed twice for 7 yards and had a catch for 20. He was a major contributor on special teams and had 4 tackles as UMass made it to the National Championship that year in 2006. As a senior Barthel battled injuries and only registered 1 rush of 5 yards and 1 catch for 4 yards.

== Professional career ==
Barthel had a tryout with the New York Giants but was not signed by the team.

Barthel signed with the Las Vegas Locomotives for the 2009 season where he teamed with fellow UMass football alum Marcel Shipp.
