= Maywood Public Schools =

School district in Bergen County, New Jersey, US

Address
- 452 Maywood Avenue Maywood, Bergen County, New Jersey, 07607; United States
- Coordinates: 40.900763°N 74.06298°W

District information
- Grades: PreK-8
- Superintendent: Michael Jordan
- Business administrator: Jennifer Pfohl
- Schools: 2

Students and staff
- Enrollment: 934 (as of 2021–22)
- Faculty: 82.0 FTEs
- Student–teacher ratio: 11.4:1

Other information
- District Factor Group: FG
- Website: maywoodschools.org
Ind.	Per pupil	District spending	Rank (*)	K-8 average	%± vs. average
1A	Total Spending	$16,051	21	$18,891	−15.0%
1	Budgetary Cost	11,059	7	14,159	−21.9%
2	Classroom Instruction	7,086	7	8,659	−18.2%
6	Support Services	1,536	11	2,167	−29.1%
8	Administrative Cost	1,195	7	1,547	−22.8%
10	Operations & Maintenance	1,151	9	1,612	−28.6%
13	Extracurricular Activities	86	37	104	−17.3%
16	Median Teacher Salary	57,955	23	61,136
Data from NJDoE 2014 Taxpayers' Guide to Education Spending. *Of K-8 districts with more than 750 students. Lowest spending=1; Highest=84

The Maywood Public Schools are a comprehensive community public school district that serves students in pre-kindergarten through eighth grade from the Borough of Maywood, in Bergen County, in the U.S. state of New Jersey.

As of the 2021–22 school year, the district, comprising two schools, had an enrollment of 934 students and 82.0 classroom teachers (on an FTE basis), for a student–teacher ratio of 11.4:1.

The district is classified by the New Jersey Department of Education as being in District Factor Group "FG", the fourth-highest of eight groupings. District Factor Groups organize districts statewide to allow comparison by common socioeconomic characteristics of the local districts. From lowest socioeconomic status to highest, the categories are A, B, CD, DE, FG, GH, I and J.

After graduating from Maywood Avenue School, approximately 250 students in public school for ninth through twelfth grades had attended Hackensack High School in Hackensack, as part of a sending/receiving relationship with the Hackensack Public Schools, together with students from Rochelle Park and South Hackensack. In the wake of rising tuition costs assessed by the Hackensack district, the district has considered a plan under which the relationship with Hackensack would be severed and a new sending relationship would be established with other neighboring districts. In March 2020, the district received approval from the New Jersey Department of Education to end the relationship it had with Hackensack started transitioning incoming ninth graders to Henry P. Becton Regional High School, which serves students from Carlstadt and East Rutherford beginning in the 2020–21 school year. The transition would be complete after the final group of twelfth graders graduates from Hackensack High School at the end of the 2023–24 school year. Maywood cited costs of nearly $14,800 per student in 2018 to send high-school students to Hackensack and an annual cost in excess of $15,000 under a proposed new three-year agreement, while Becton would start at a per-pupil cost of $10,500 in 2020–21 as part of a ten-year deal that would have a maximum cost per Maywood student of $11,800 in the final year of the agreement. As of the 2021–22 school year, the high school had an enrollment of 653 students and 51.1 classroom teachers (on an FTE basis), for a student–teacher ratio of 12.8:1.

== History ==
Students from Maywood began attending Hackensack High School in September 1966, after the district ended a longstanding sending relationship under which students had attended Bogota High School.

== Awards and recognition ==
For the 1996-97 school year, Memorial School was formally designated as a National Blue Ribbon School, the highest honor that an American school can achieve.

== Schools ==
Schools in the district (with 2021–22 enrollment from the National Center for Education Statistics) are:

- Memorial School with 413 students in grades PreK-3
  - Michael Halligan, principal
- Maywood Avenue School with 515 students in grades 4-8. The school offers a wide variety of after-school activities ranging from cheerleading to chess club. Older students have the opportunity to contribute to their school newspaper, The Hawk, and their yearbook.

== Administration ==
Core members of the district's administration are:

- Michael Jordan, superintendent of schools
- Jennifer Pfohl, business administrator and board secretary

== Board of education ==
The district's board of education, comprised of seven members, sets policy and oversees the fiscal and educational operation of the district through its administration. As a Type II school district, the board's trustees are elected directly by voters to serve three-year terms of office on a staggered basis, with either two or three seats up for election each year held (since 2012) as part of the November general election. The board appoints a superintendent to oversee the district's day-to-day operations and a business administrator to supervise the business functions of the district.
