= Ellen Zavian =

The First Female NFL Sports Agent

- Born: June 15, 1963 (age 63)
- Occupation: Attorney

Academic background
- Education: University of Maryland, College Park; Washington College of Law

Academic work
- Discipline: George Washington University Law School

Ellen Marsha Zavian (born June 15, 1963) is an American sports agent and attorney. She is noted for becoming the first woman to serve as an attorney-agent representing players and coaches in the National Football League (NFL). Zavian teaches at the George Washington University Law School and has worked with athletes across football, soccer, softball, skateboarding, BMX, inliners, and breakers. She has also held roles in journalism and served on several sports-related boards and committees.

== Early life and education ==
Zavian was raised in Maywood, New Jersey, in a family involved in athletics. She attended Maywood Elementary School and Hackensack High School, where she participated in soccer, volleyball, track and field, and cheerleading. She earned her Bachelor of Science degree in business management and marketing, from the University of Maryland in 1985 and a Juris Doctor from American University – Washington College of Law in 1988.

== Early career ==
During the 1980s, Zavian worked in the promotional departments at Maryland racetracks and at the University of Maryland's Recreation Center. While in law school, she interned at the National Football League Players Association during the 1987 NFL Players' Strike. Zavian worked under the supervision of NFL Hall of Famer Gene Upshaw, with her direct report to the economist, Michael Duberstein, credited for creating the CAP in professional sports.

== Legal career ==
After graduating from law school, Zavian joined a Senior Management Group LLC, a sports-focused law firm based near Philadelphia. She represented professional football players as an attorney-agent before establishing her own practice. In 1990, at age 26, she became the first woman to represent NFL players and coaches as an attorney-agent.

Her clients included John Booty, Troy Brown, Frank Reich, Steve Tasker, Erik McMillan and Tim Manoa. In 1995, members of the United States women's national soccer team sought her assistance in contract negotiations with the U.S. Soccer Federation. The resulting collective bargaining agreement was the first in women's sports to include provisions such as a paid pregnancy leave clause and childcare support. The 1996 Olympic Gold Medalist team included Julie Foudy, Carla Overbeck, Kristine Lilly and Mia Hamm, to name a few.

In the early 2000s, Zavian expanded her work to athletes in skateboarding, BMX, inline skating, and breakdancing. She helped establish several player associations, including groups for women's national team soccer players, extreme athletes and competitive breakdancers. Zavian has served as the founding Executive Director of the Women's National Team Soccer Players Association, the Women's National Team Softball Association, the United Professional Skateboarder Association, and the United Breaking Association. She contributed to efforts that led to breakdancing's recognition for inclusion in the 2024 Paris Olympics.

Zavian has held appointments with FIFA's Pro Bono Counsel, SafeSport International's Board of Trustees, the FIFPRO DEI Committee, and the Maryland Racing Commission.

In 2022, she became the first General Counsel for USA Lacrosse, the governing body of lacrosse in the United States and in 2025, she joined USA Football, the governing body of tackle and flag football in the United States, as General Counsel.

== Journalism career ==
Zavian has held several positions in the field of journalism. She served as an inaugural columnist for Conde Nast's Street & Smith's Sports Business Journal, covering the business of women's sports and Fairchild's Branding focused magazine, covering the sports marketing industry, as well as writing for Pro Football Weekly, focusing on the business of professional football. She has served as editor-in-chief for Esports and the Law and My Legal Bookie, both of which focus on the legal issues within esports and gaming. In 2020, she became a contributing author in esports coverage for The Washington Post. Other writings and quotes of hers have appeared in Forbes, Sports Illustrated, Association of Corporate Counsel, and Sports Law Expert. She has also made appearances on CNN, C-SPAN, and NPR.

== Teaching career ==
Zavian is a professorial lecturer in law at George Washington School of Law and she teaches in the university's Sports Management program. She has also taught at the University of Baltimore Law School, David A. Clarke School of Law, George Mason - Antonin Scalia Law School, and American University – Washington College of Law.

== Awards ==
New Jersey Achievement Award (1992)

Top 20 Most Powerful Women In Sports by the Women's Sports and Fitness Foundation (1997)

Inductee, Jewish Community Center of Greater DC's Sports Hall of Fame (2001)

== Personal life ==
Zavian is a resident of the state of Maryland. She has participated in marathons,s triathlons and body building.
