= Henry Becton =

American businessman (1914–2009)

- Born: Henry Prentiss Becton; September 15, 1914; Rutherford, New Jersey, US
- Died: October 25, 2009 (aged 95); Blue Hill, Maine, US
- Other name: Hank Becton
- Education: Yale University
- Employer: Becton, Dickinson and Company
- Father: Maxwell Becton

Henry "Hank" Prentiss Becton (September 15, 1914 – October 25, 2009) was an American business executive and philanthropist. He was the chairman of Becton Dickinson and Company.

The Henry P. Becton School of Nursing & Allied Health at Fairleigh Dickinson University and the Becton Center for Engineering and Applied Science at Yale University were named in his honor.

== Early life ==
Becton was born in Rutherford, New Jersey on September 15, 1914. His parents were Valerie and Maxwell Becton, an industrialist.

He attended Rutherford High School before switching to the Taft School in Connecticut. He then attended Yale University, graduating in 1937. While at Yale, he was a member St. Anthony Hall, the Aurelian Society, and Tau Beta Phi. He belonged to the Yale Glee Club and toured Europe with the group. He was also a member of The Whiffenpoofs, a singing quartet. He wrote the lyrics for Yale's new football anthem in 1936. He also wrote several songs that were included in the Yale Songbook.

== Career ==
In 1937, Becton started working for Becton, Dickinson and Company, the international medical instruments company that his father co-founded in 1897. His first job was as a traveling salesman in the midwest. In 1939, he was assigned to the company's office. He became the assistant treasurer in 1944. He was elected to the board of directors and was the secretary of the company.

After his father retired in 1948, Becton became the executive vice president. He was the chairman of the board of director's executive committee from 1961 to February 1987. He became chairman of the board in May 1972, vice chairman in December 1972, and chairman again in 1977. From 1961 through February 1987, he was chairman of the executive committee of the company's board of directors.

Under his leadership, Becton, Dickinson and Company went public, becoming a member of the Dow Jones Sustainability and World Indexes that was listed on the Fortune 500. It grew from $2.5 million in annual sales and 600 employees to $7 billion in annual sales and 29,000 employees. He retired as chairman of the board in 1980, serving as vice chairman until February 1987. He was then a director emeritus.

Becton was a director and vice chairman of the National Community Bank (now part of Bank of New York/ Mellon) from 1947 to 1993, and a director of the Bergen County and New Jersey Chambers of Commerce. He chaired the chambers' committee on aviation.

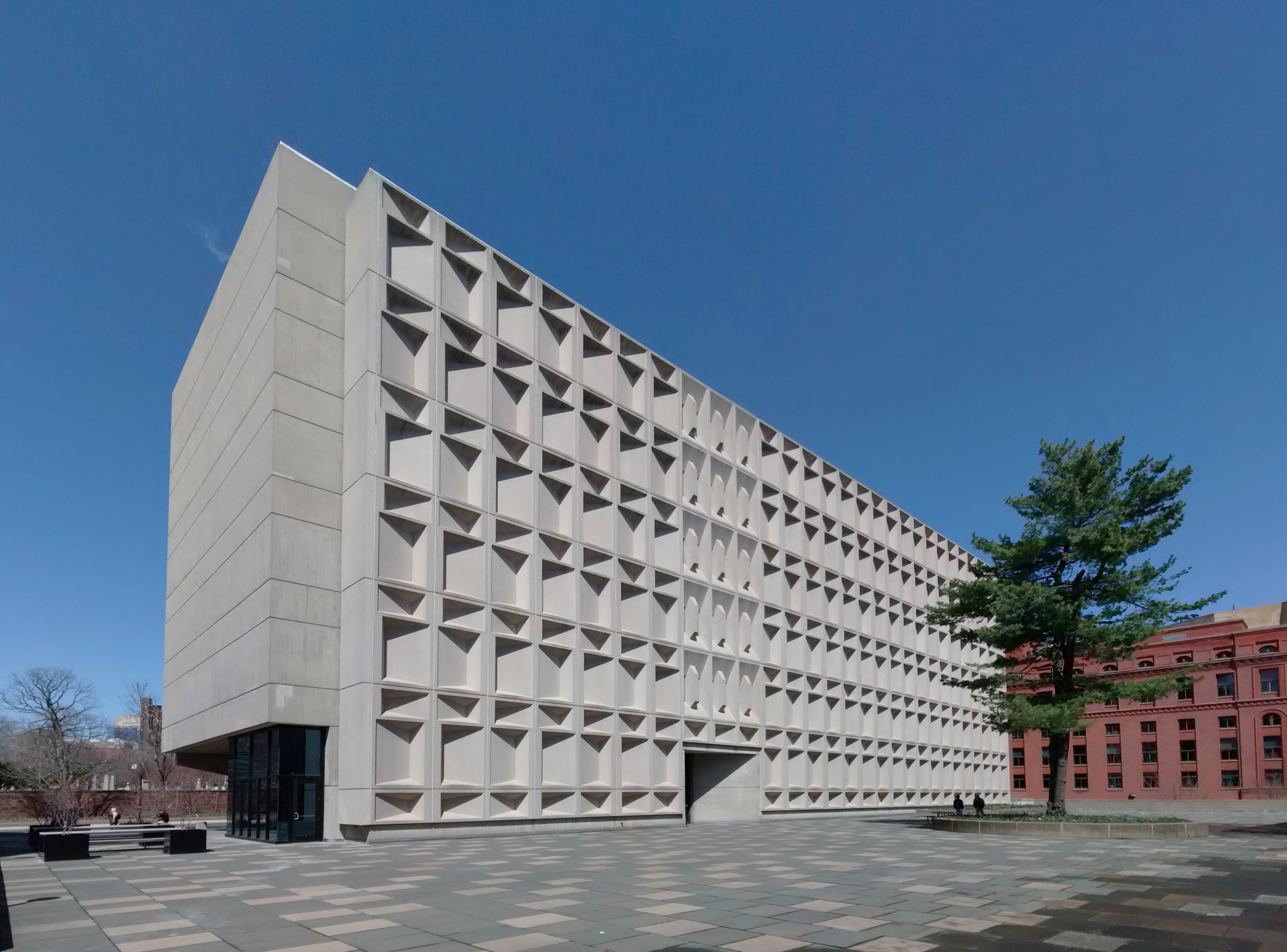
Becton Center, Yale University

== Honors ==
The Henry P. Becton School of Nursing & Allied Health at Fairleigh Dickinson University was named in his honor. The Henry P. Becton Regional High School in East Rutherford, New Jersey was named in his honor.

In 1974, he received the Yale Medal from Yale University. The Becton Center for Engineering and Applied Science at Yale was named in his honor. In addition, Yale's Engineering and Applied Science Department gives the Henry Prentiss Becton Prize in his honor.

== Personal life ==
Becton married Jean Sprague Coggan on June 16, 1942. They lived in Rutherford. Soon afterward, Becton was drafted into the U.S. Army and sent overseas for World War II as a first sergeant. He was promoted to technical sergeant and chief of the combat intelligiance section at the 8th Air Force Fighter Wing Headquarters in England.

Their children were Henry, Jean, Jeffery, Cynthia, and LIzabeth. The family spent summers in Blue Hill, Maine, where he took up sailing. He was the Commodore of the Kollegewidgwok Yacht Club. After his retirement, Becton and his wife spent their summers in Maine and lived at the Dorchester in Naples, Florida, followed by The Moorings in Vero Beach, Florida.

Becton enjoyed singing, sailing, and flying airplanes. He was a director of the Hackensack Golf Club.

He served as a borough councilman for Rutherford, New Jersey, and was president of the New Jersey Symphony Orchestra. He was a founding commissioner of the New Jersey Public Broadcasting Authority and a founder of the New Jersey Performing Arts Center. He also chaired the Standing Committee for Clinical Thermometers at the U.S. Bureau of Standards.

He served as the vice chair and a trustee of Fairleigh Dickinson University from 1948 to 1994. He donated land for a new school when the East Rutherford, New Jersey high school burned down; the new building was named the Henry P. Becton Regional High School in his honor. He was a founding director of the Community Chest in Bergen County (now United Way). He also was the major donor to the construction of the Becton Center for Engineering and Applied Science at Yale University the building's design incorporates symbolism from his fraternity, St. Anthony Hall.

On October 25, 2009, Becton died from congestive heart failure in Blue Hill, Maine at the age of 95.
