= Bogota Public Schools =

School district in Bergen County, New Jersey, US

- The emblem of Bogota Public Schools

Address
- 1 Henry C. Luthin Place Bogota, Bergen County, New Jersey, 07603
- Coordinates: 40.878106°N 74.024565°W

District information
- Grades: PreK-12
- Superintendent: Damian Kennedy
- Business administrator: Irfan Evcil
- Schools: 4

Students and staff
- Enrollment: 1,381 (as of 2022–23)
- Faculty: 103.1 FTEs
- Student–teacher ratio: 13.4:1

Other information
- District Factor Group: DE
- Website: www.bogotaboe.com
Ind.	Per pupil	District spending	Rank (*)	K-12 average	%± vs. average
1A	Total Spending	$18,310	28	$18,891	−3.1%
1	Budgetary Cost	12,625	10	14,783	−14.6%
2	Classroom Instruction	7,720	19	8,763	−11.9%
6	Support Services	1,860	16	2,392	−22.2%
8	Administrative Cost	1,564	21	1,485	5.3%
10	Operations & Maintenance	1,033	1	1,783	−42.1%
13	Extracurricular Activities	428	22	268	59.7%
16	Median Teacher Salary	62,418	29	64,043
Data from NJDoE 2014 Taxpayers' Guide to Education Spending. *Of K-12 districts with up to 1,800 students. Lowest spending=1; Highest=49

The Bogota Public Schools are a comprehensive community public school district serving students in pre-kindergarten through twelfth grade from the Borough of Bogota in Bergen County, in the U.S. state of New Jersey.

As of the 2022–23 school year, the district, comprising four schools, had an enrollment of 1,381 students and 103.1 classroom teachers (on an FTE basis), for a student–teacher ratio of 13.4:1.

The district is classified by the New Jersey Department of Education as being in District Factor Group "DE", the fifth-highest of eight groupings. District Factor Groups organize districts statewide to allow comparison by common socioeconomic characteristics of the local districts. From lowest socioeconomic status to highest, the categories are A, B, CD, DE, FG, GH, I, and J.

== Awards and recognition ==
Lillian M. Steen School was one of nine schools in New Jersey honored in 2020 by the National Blue Ribbon Schools Program, which recognizes high student achievement.

== Schools ==
Schools in the district (with 2022–23 enrollment data from the National Center for Education Statistics.) are:

- E. Roy Bixby School with 293 students in grades PreK–5
  - Damon J. Englese, principal
- Lillian M. Steen School which served 326 students in grades PreK–5
  - Kelly Foley DeCongelio, principal

Middle school

- Bogota Middle School with an enrollment of 197 students in grades 6–7
  - Christopher Albiez, principal

High School

- Bogota High School with an enrollment of 442 students in grades 8–12
  - Jeannie Paz, principal

== Administration ==
Core members of the district's administration are:

- Damian Kennedy, superintendent of schools
- Irfan Evcil, business administrator and board secretary

== Board of education ==
The district's board of education, consisting of nine members, sets policy and oversees the fiscal and educational operation of the district through its administration. As a Type II school district, the board's trustees are elected directly by voters to serve three-year terms of office on a staggered basis, with three seats up for election each year held (since 2012) as part of the November general election. The board appoints a superintendent to oversee the district's day-to-day operations and a business administrator to supervise the business functions of the district.
