= East Rutherford School District =

School district in Bergen County, New Jersey, US

Address
- 100 Uhland Street East Rutherford, Bergen County, New Jersey, 07073; United States
- Coordinates: 40.83495°N 74.099559°W

District information
- Grades: PreK–8
- Superintendent: Frank Scarafile (interim)
- Business administrator: Alex Verace
- Schools: 3

Students and staff
- Enrollment: 768 (as of 2023–24)
- Faculty: 81.9 FTEs
- Student–teacher ratio: 9.4:1

Other information
- District Factor Group: CD
- Website: www.erboe.net
Ind.	Per pupil	District spending	Rank (*)	K-8 average	%± vs. average
1A	Total Spending	$21,197	80	$18,891	12.2%
1	Budgetary Cost	16,298	79	14,159	15.1%
2	Classroom Instruction	10,372	81	8,659	19.8%
6	Support Services	2,498	64	2,167	15.3%
8	Administrative Cost	1,659	52	1,547	7.2%
10	Operations & Maintenance	1,649	54	1,612	2.3%
13	Extracurricular Activities	73	26	104	−29.8%
16	Median Teacher Salary	90,600	84	61,136
Data from NJDoE 2014 Taxpayers' Guide to Education Spending. *Of K-8 districts with more than 750 students. Lowest spending=1; Highest=84

The East Rutherford School District is a community public school district that serves students in pre-kindergarten through eighth grade from East Rutherford, in Bergen County, in the U.S. state of New Jersey.

As of the 2023–24 school year, the district, comprised of three schools, had an enrollment of 768 students and 81.9 classroom teachers (on an FTE basis), for a student–teacher ratio of 9.4:1.

For grades ninth through twelfth grades, public school students attend the Becton Regional High School in East Rutherford, which serves high school students from both Carlstadt and East Rutherford as part of the Carlstadt-East Rutherford Regional School District, together with students from Maywood, who attend as part of a sending/receiving relationship. As of the 2023–24 school year, the high school had an enrollment of 821 students and 61.5 classroom teachers (on an FTE basis), for a student–teacher ratio of 13.4:1.

== History ==
A January 2020 referendum to fund $35.5 million in improvements to both schools and to district offices was passed by voters by a margin of 18 votes. With approximately $5 million in state aid to cover the project included, the project would add $360 to property taxes assessed on a home at the borough average.

The district had been classified by the New Jersey Department of Education as being in District Factor Group "CD", the sixth-highest of eight groupings. District Factor Groups organize districts statewide to allow comparison by common socioeconomic characteristics of the local districts. From lowest socioeconomic status to highest, the categories are A, B, CD, DE, FG, GH, I and J.

An annex was constructed in 2001 across the street from the Faust main building which includes a small office and four classrooms used for pre-kindergarten and fifth graders. McKenzie School is used for children from pre-kindergarten until third grade.

== Schools ==
Schools in the district (with 2023–24 enrollment data from the National Center for Education Statistics) are:

- McKenzie School with 376 students in grades PreK–3
  - Brian Barrow, principal
- Lincoln School with 153 students in grades 4–5
  - Peter Vilardi, principal
- Alfred S. Faust School with 232 students in grades 6–8
  - Regina Barrale, principal

== Administration ==
Core members of the district's administration are:

- Frank Scarafile, interim superintendent
- Alessandro Verace, business administrator and board secretary

== Board of education ==
The district's board of education, comprised of seven members, sets policy and oversees the fiscal and educational operation of the district through its administration. As a Type II school district, the board's trustees are elected directly by voters to serve three-year terms of office on a staggered basis, with either two three seats up for election each year held (since 2014) as part of the November general election. The board appoints a superintendent to oversee the district's day-to-day operations and a business administrator to supervise the business functions of the district.
