= Hackensack Public Schools =

School district in New Jersey, US

Address
- 191 Second Street Hackensack, Bergen County, New Jersey, 07601; United States
- Coordinates: 40.889732°N 74.041821°W

District information
- Grades: PreK to 12
- Superintendent: Thomas McBryde
- Business administrator: Lydia Singh
- Schools: 6

Students and staff
- Enrollment: 5,483 (as of 2021–22)
- Faculty: 415.8 FTEs
- Student–teacher ratio: 13.2:1

Other information
- District Factor Group: CD
- Website: www.hackensackschools.org
Ind.	Per pupil	District spending	Rank (*)	K-12 average	%± vs. average
1A	Total Spending	$24,046	98	$18,891	27.3%
1	Budgetary Cost	15,746	74	14,783	6.5%
2	Classroom Instruction	10,173	93	8,763	16.1%
6	Support Services	2,419	61	2,392	1.1%
8	Administrative Cost	1,274	23	1,485	−14.2%
10	Operations & Maintenance	1,611	51	1,783	−9.6%
13	Extracurricular Activities	268	61	268	0.0%
16	Median Teacher Salary	81,508	97	64,043
Data from NJDoE 2014 Taxpayers' Guide to Education Spending. *Of K-12 districts with more than 3,500 students. Lowest spending=1; Highest=103

The Hackensack Public Schools are a comprehensive community public school district that serves students in pre-kindergarten through twelfth grade from the City of Hackensack, in Bergen County, in the U.S. state of New Jersey.

As of the 2021–22 school year, the district, comprising six schools, had an enrollment of 5,483 students and 415.8 classroom teachers (on an FTE basis), for a student–teacher ratio of 13.2:1.

The district is classified by the New Jersey Department of Education as being in District Factor Group "CD", the sixth-highest of eight groupings. District Factor Groups organize districts statewide to allow comparison by common socioeconomic characteristics of the local districts. From lowest socioeconomic status to highest, the categories are A, B, CD, DE, FG, GH, I and J.

The district's high school serves students from South Hackensack and Rochelle Park as part of sending/receiving relationships with the respective districts. In March 2020, the Maywood Public Schools announced that it had received approval from the New Jersey Department of Education to end the relationship it had established with Hackensack in 1969 and begin transitioning incoming ninth graders to Henry P. Becton Regional High School beginning in the 2020–21 school year. Maywood cited costs of nearly $14,800 per student in 2018 to send students to Hackensack while Becton would start a cost of $10,500 per student.

== History ==
In 1948, the district had a school with all African-American students but which had teachers of multiple races. While the school was in operation during de jure educational segregation in the United States, Noma Jensen of Journal of Negro Education wrote "This school is all Negro by reason of population."

Superintendent Karen Lewis was suspended in 2016. Assistant superintendent Joseph Cicchelli became an acting superintendent instead of fulfilling his planned retirement. Rosemary Marks became the superintendent in 2017.

== Awards and recognition ==
Hackensack High School (HHS) was named one of America's best high schools by Newsweek magazine in its 2013 rankings. Ranked among the top six percent of high schools in the country, HHS was recognized based on various criteria including Advanced Placement (AP) programs, the four-year, on-time graduation rate and number of graduates accepted into a two- or four-year college program.

Jackson Avenue Elementary School was recognized by Governor Jim McGreevey in 2003 as one of 25 schools selected statewide for the First Annual Governor's School of Excellence award.

== Schools ==
Schools in the district, with 2021–22 enrollment data from the National Center for Education Statistics, are:

Preschool

- Early Childhood Development Center

Elementary schools

- Fairmount Elementary School with 598 students in grades PreK-4
  - Eric Boateng, principal
- Fanny Meyer Hillers School with 473 students in grades PreK-4
  - Judith A. Soto, principal
- Jackson Avenue School with 435 students in grades PreK-4
  - Christopher Moran, principal
- Nellie K. Parker School with 527 students in grades PreK-4
  - Lillian Whitaker, principal

Middle school

- Hackensack Middle School with 1,447 students in grades 5-8
  - Joy Dorsey-Whiting, principal

High school

- Hackensack High School with 1,852 students in grades 9-12
  - James Montesano, principal

== Administration ==
Core members of the district's administration are:

- Thomas McBryde Jr., superintendent
- Lydia Singh, business administrator and board secretary

== Board of education ==
The district's board of education, composed of nine members, sets policy and oversees the fiscal and educational operation of the district through its administration, with an added representative from Maywood, who represents that district in matters related to the high school. As a Type II school district, the board's trustees are elected directly by voters to serve three-year terms of office on a staggered basis, with three seats up for election each year held as part of the April school election. The board appoints a superintendent to oversee the district's day-to-day operations and a business administrator to supervise the business functions of the district. As one of the 13 districts statewide with school elections in April (five of which are in Bergen County), voters also decide on passage of the annual school budget.
