= Becton Regional High School =

High school in New Jersey, United States

Location
- 120 Paterson Avenue; East Rutherford, Bergen County, New Jersey 07073; United States; 40.83257°N 74.094149°W

Information
- Type: Public high school
- Established: 1971 / Renovated 2014
- School district: Carlstadt-East Rutherford Regional School District
- NCES School ID: 340280000300
- Principal: James Bononno
- Faculty: 60.5 FTEs
- Enrollment: 853 (as of 2024–25)
- Student to teacher ratio: 14.1:1
- Colors: Maroon and white
- Athletics conference: North Jersey Interscholastic Conference
- Team name: Wildcats
- Rival: Wallington High School
- Publication: Images (art and literary)
- Newspaper: Cat's Eye View
- Yearbook: The Tea Leaf
- Website: bectonhs.org

Henry P. Becton Regional High School (commonly known as Becton Regional High School) is a four-year comprehensive public high school serving students in ninth through twelfth grades from Carlstadt and East Rutherford, in Bergen County, in the U.S. state of New Jersey, operating as part of the Carlstadt-East Rutherford Regional School District. Students from Maywood attend the school as part of a sending/receiving relationship with the Maywood Public Schools.

Becton Regional High School is accredited by the New Jersey Department of Education and has been accredited by the Middle States Association of Colleges and Schools since 1938.

As of the 2024–25 school year, the school had an enrollment of 853 students and 60.5 classroom teachers (on an FTE basis), for a student–teacher ratio of 14.1:1. There were 290 students (34.0% of enrollment) eligible for free lunch and 56 (6.6% of students) eligible for reduced-cost lunch.

== History ==
After a fire in October 1966 destroyed half of the former East Rutherford High School, the regional district was created with the passage of a referendum in June 1968.

The new high school was named in honor of Henry Becton, chairman of Becton, Dickinson and Company who donated part of the company's original East Rutherford property to be used as a site for the construction of the school. Constructed on a 2.6-acre (1.1 ha) site, the building was designed to accommodate an enrollment of 1,100 students and was completed at a cost of $4.3 million (equivalent to $34.2 million in 2025)

The building opened in September 1971 with 800 students in attendance.

Becton Regional HS has science labs, a two-floor media center and technology hub, and a gymnasium and weight facility. The building recently underwent a $28 million renovation, which included enhancements to its technology infrastructure, heating & cooling, and security system.

In March 2020, the Maywood Public Schools received approval from the New Jersey Department of Education to end the relationship it had established with the Hackensack Public Schools in 1969 to send students to Hackensack High School. Maywood will begin transitioning incoming ninth graders to Henry P. Becton Regional High School beginning in the 2020–21 school year. The transition would be complete after the final group of twelfth graders graduates from Hackensack High School at the end of the 2023–24 school year.

== Awards, recognition and rankings ==
In 2018, the New Jersey Department of Education (NJDOE) recognized Henry P. Becton Regional High School as a model high school based on recent academic success and career-focused programs. The NJDOE stated, "Henry P. Becton Regional High School instituted a more flexible and diversified class schedule, a common lunch period, career-focused internship and dual enrollment programs and digital learning upgrades focused on innovation across the curriculum. As a result, their graduation rate increased over 13 percentage points over the past 4 years."

The school was the 202nd-ranked public high school in New Jersey out of 339 schools statewide in New Jersey Monthly magazine's September 2014 cover story on the state's "Top Public High Schools", using a new ranking methodology. The school had been ranked 150th in the state of 328 schools in 2012, after being ranked 150th in 2010 out of 322 schools listed. The magazine ranked the school 138th in 2008 out of 316 schools. The school was ranked 145th in the magazine's September 2006 issue, which surveyed 316 schools across the state.

Schooldigger.com ranked the school 193rd out of 376 public high schools statewide in its 2010 rankings (a decrease of 30 positions from the 2009 rank) which were based on the combined percentage of students classified as proficient or above proficient on the language arts literacy and mathematics components of the High School Proficiency Assessment (HSPA).

== Location ==
The school is located on Paterson Avenue, near the border of Carlstadt, and near Route 17.

== Extracurricular activities ==
The school mascot is the Wildcat, and its colors are maroon and white. The school's newspaper is the weekly Cat's Eye View, and the yearbook is The Tealeaf. The school also publishes Images, an annual art and literary magazine.

== Athletics ==
Becton offers the following competitive team and individual sports: cross country, football, girls' and boys' soccer, girls' and boys' tennis, volleyball, wrestling girls' and boys' basketball, bowling, softball, baseball, and boys' and girls' track.

The Henry P. Becton Wildcats participate in the North Jersey Interscholastic Conference, which is comprised of small-enrollment schools in Bergen, Hudson, Morris and Passaic counties, and was created following a reorganization of sports leagues in Northern New Jersey by the New Jersey State Interscholastic Athletic Association (NJSIAA). With 357 students in grades 10–12, the school was classified by the NJSIAA for the 2019–20 school year as Group I for most athletic competition purposes, which included schools with an enrollment of 75 to 476 students in that grade range. The school was classified by the NJSIAA as Group II North for football for 2022–2024, which included schools with 484 to 683 students.

The school participates as the host school / lead agency in joint girls soccer and boys tennis teams with Wallington High School. These co-op programs operate under agreements scheduled to expire at the end of the 2023–24 school year.

The football team won the NJSIAA North I Group I state sectional championship in 1974 (awarded by the NJSIAA) and 1993, and won the North II Group I title in 2003. The 1993 team finished the season with a 10–1 record after winning its first sectional playoff title with a 21–14 victory in the North I Group I championship game against Pompton Lakes High School. The team won the 2003 North II, Group I state sectional championship with a 24–0 win over Bogota High School in the tournament final. Becton has maintained a rivalry with Wallington High School since the two schools first played each other in 1973, which was listed by The Record as one of the best in Bergen and Passaic counties; through the 2017 season, Becton leads with a 15–5 record in games between the two schools.

The wrestling team won the North I Group I state sectional championship in 1996. The team won back-to-back league championships in 2008-09 and 2009–10. They also were the District 15 champions and Garfield tournament champions. The Wildcats were also voted the 2010 Bergen County Group I/II team of the year.

The 2002 baseball team won the North I, Group I state title, edging Weehawken High School 7–6 in the final game. The team won for the second consecutive year in 2003, defeating Waldwick High School 2–1 in the tournament final. The team made it a threepeat in 2004, with a 5–2 win in the title game against Verona High School.

The boys' cross country team won the 2003-2005 BCSL National titles and the 2005 Bergen County D title. The girls' cross country team won the 2005-07 BCSL National titles.

Since 2000, the bowling team has won the following titles:

- BCSL National champions: 2001, 2002, 2003, 2005, 2006, 2007, 2008, 2011
- Bergen County Group 1-2: 2007
- State sectional title, North I, Group I: 2012
- State Group I champion: 2007

== Controversy ==
In 1994, the school made efforts to allow a handicapped athlete to compete using a wheelchair in track events against able-bodied runners. The effort was rejected by a New Jersey judge who ruled against the district.

== Administration ==
The school's principal is James Bononno. His core school administration team includes the assistant principal.

== Notable alumni ==
- E. J. Barthel (born 1985), fullback who played for the Las Vegas Locomotives of the United Football League
- Liv Morgan (born 1994), professional wrestler and multi-time champion in the WWE
- Marc Rizzo (born 1977, class of 1995), lead guitarist of Brazilian Metal band Soulfly

== See also ==
- List of high schools in New Jersey
