= Bogota High School =

High school in Bergen County, New Jersey, US

Bogota Jr./Sr. High School

Location
- 2 Henry C. Luthin Place; Bogota, Bergen County, New Jersey 07603; United States; 40.8781°N 74.0245°W

Information
- Type: Public high school
- Established: 1924
- School district: Bogota Public Schools
- NCES School ID: 340192000284
- Principal: Jeannie Paz
- Faculty: 38.0 FTEs
- Grades: 8–12
- Enrollment: 475 (as of 2024–25)
- Student to teacher ratio: 12.5:1
- Colors: Purple and Gold
- Athletics conference: North Jersey Interscholastic Conference
- Team name: Buccaneers
- Publication: The Outloook (literary publication)
- Newspaper: The Klaxon
- Yearbook: The Purple "B"
- Website: www.bogotaboe.com/o/bjshs

Bogota High School (formally known as Bogota Jr./Sr. High School) is a comprehensive public high school that serves students in eighth through twelfth grade from Bogota, in Bergen County, in the U.S. state of New Jersey, operating as the lone secondary school of the Bogota Public Schools.

As of the 2024–25 school year, the school had an enrollment of 475 students and 38.0 classroom teachers (on an FTE basis), for a student–teacher ratio of 12.5:1. There were 226 students (47.6% of enrollment) eligible for free lunch and 57 (12.0% of students) eligible for reduced-cost lunch.

== History ==
The high school opened in 1924, before which students from the borough attended Leonia High School. Some students from Teaneck, attended the school until 1931.

Students from Maywood began attending Bogota High School starting in 1929. The students were shifted to Hackensack High School in September 1966, after the Maywood Public Schools ended a longstanding sending relationship under which students had attended Bogota High School.

== Awards, recognition and rankings ==
The school was the 200th-ranked public high school in New Jersey out of 339 schools statewide in New Jersey Monthly magazine's September 2014 cover story on the state's "Top Public High Schools," using a new ranking methodology. The school had been ranked 259th in the state of 328 schools in 2012, after being ranked 151st in 2010 out of 322 schools listed. The magazine ranked the school 173rd in 2008 out of 316 schools. The school was ranked 132nd in the magazine's September 2006 issue, which surveyed 316 schools across the state.

Schooldigger.com ranked the school as 278th out of 376 public high schools statewide in its 2010 rankings (a decrease of 48 positions from the 2009 rank) which were based on the combined percentage of students classified as proficient or above proficient on the language arts literacy and mathematics components of the High School Proficiency Assessment (HSPA).

== Athletics ==
The Bogota High School Buccaneers participate in the North Jersey Interscholastic Conference, which is comprised of small-enrollment schools in Bergen, Hudson, Morris and Passaic counties, and was created following a reorganization of sports leagues in Northern New Jersey by the New Jersey State Interscholastic Athletic Association (NJSIAA). Prior to the realignment that took effect in the fall of 2010, Bogota was a member of the Bergen County Scholastic League (BCSL) in the Olympic Division. With 258 students in grades 10–12, the school was classified by the NJSIAA for the 2019–20 school year as Group I for most athletic competition purposes, which included schools with an enrollment of 75 to 476 students in that grade range. The school was classified by the NJSIAA as Group I North for football for 2024–2026, which included schools with 254 to 474 students.

The school participates as the host school / lead agency for a joint wrestling team with Ridgefield Park High School. The co-op program operates under agreements scheduled to expire at the end of the 2023–24 school year.

Interscholastic sports offered include:

Fall

- Football
- Volleyball
- Soccer
- Fall Cheering
- Boys' & Girls' Cross Country

Winter

- Wrestling
- Winter Cheering
- Bowling
- Boys' & Girls' Basketball

Spring

- Boys' Baseball
- Girls' Softball
- Boys' & Girls' Track & Field

The boys basketball team won the Group II state championship in 1935 (defeating Cranford High School in the tournament finals), 1944 (vs. Lakewood High School) and 1990 (vs. Haddonfield Memorial High School). The team won the 1935 title with a 28–24 win in the playoff finals against Cranford. The 1944 team won the Group II title with a 36–34 win against Lakewood in the championship game at the Elizabeth Armory on a shot scored with three seconds left in the game. The 1990 team, led by former North Carolina Tar Heel Pat Sullivan, won the NJ Group I state basketball title with a 47–44 win against Haddonfield and won the Bergen County Tournament, defeating non-public power Bergen Catholic High School in the championship game. Down by five points in the last minute of regulation in the championship game, the 1993 team tied Ramapo High School to force overtime and went on to win the Bergen County Jamboree by a score of 60–57.

The boys cross country team won the Group II state championship in 1960. The team won the 2006, 2007 and 2008 Bergen County Division D Championship.

The girls volleyball team won the Group I state championship in 1987 (defeating runner-up Midland Park High School in the final match of the playoffs), 2007 (vs. Midland Park), 2010 (vs. Madison High School), 2011 (vs. Science Park High School), 2012 (vs. Secaucus High School), 2013 (vs. Rutherford High School), 2015 (vs. Leonia High School), 2016 (vs. Verona High School), 2018 (vs. Verona), 2019 (vs. Kinnelon High School) and 2021 (vs. Delaware Valley Regional High School). The program's 11 state titles are the fourth-most in the state. The 2012 team won the Bergen County Tournament, defeating Immaculate Heart Academy in the finals, then faced Immaculate Heart in the finals of the Tournament of Champions and losing in three sets. In 2019, the team won its eighth Group I title in ten seasons with a win in the final match against Kinnelen High School by scores of 25–18 and 25–11.

The girls cross country team won the Group I state championship in 1994 and 1996.

The Buccaneers came into the 2006 state football tournament ranked first in their bracket, and proceeded to beat #8 seed Cresskill High School by a score of 36–7 in the first round and fourth-ranked Hasbrouck Heights High School by 24–17 in the semifinal game. On December 1, 2006, Bogota beat sixth seed Mountain Lakes High School 28–0 at Giants Stadium, to take home the North 1, Group I state championship. This was Bogota's first football state championship since 1957, and their first since the playoff era started in the 1970s.

In 2009, Emmanuel Ajagbe became Bogota's first wrestling state champion, winning the 145 pound title at the state finals at Boardwalk Hall in Atlantic City, New Jersey.

== Administration ==
The school's principal is Jeannie Paz. Her administration team includes the vice principal.

== Notable alumni ==
- Walter G. Schroeder (1927–2021), politician who was a member of the Oregon House of Representatives from 1985 to 1993
- Pat Schuber (born 1947), politician who served as Mayor of Bogota, represented the 38th legislative district in the New Jersey General Assembly and served 12 years as the Bergen County Executive
- Harvey Silverglate (born 1942), attorney, journalist, writer, and co-founder of the Foundation for Individual Rights in Education
- Pat Sullivan (born 1971), basketball player and coach
- Al Yates (1945–2007), baseball outfielder who played in Major League Baseball for the Milwaukee Brewers
