= Hackensack High School =

High school in Bergen County, New Jersey, US

Location
- 135 First Street; Hackensack, Bergen County, New Jersey 07601; United States; 40.88505°N 74.052119°W

Information
- Type: Public high school
- Motto: "There is no limit to the good a man can do, if he doesn't care who gets the credit." Seal motto: Scientia Terras Irradiamus (We irradiate the Earth with knowledge.)
- Established: 1894
- School district: Hackensack Public Schools
- NCES School ID: 340627000496
- Principal: James Montesano
- Faculty: 137.3 FTEs
- Grades: 9th–12th
- Enrollment: 1,813 (as of 2024–25)
- Student to teacher ratio: 13.2:1
- Colors: Navy Blue and Gold
- Athletics: 25 Teams
- Athletics conference: Big North Conference (general); North Jersey Super Football Conference (football)
- Team name: Comets
- Rival: Teaneck High School
- Newspaper: The Voice
- Yearbook: The Comet
- School song: "Old Hackensack"
- Website: hhs.hackensackschools.org

Hackensack High School is a four-year comprehensive public high school located in Hackensack, in the U.S. state of New Jersey, operating as part of the Hackensack Public Schools. Hackensack High School serves students from the Bergen County, New Jersey, communities of Hackensack, South Hackensack (80 students in 2011–12), and Rochelle Park (120 students).

As of the 2024–25 school year, the school had an enrollment of 1,813 students and 137.3 classroom teachers (on an FTE basis), for a student–teacher ratio of 13.2:1. There were 1,029 students (56.8% of enrollment) eligible for free lunch and 126 (6.9% of students) eligible for reduced-cost lunch.

== History ==
In March 2020, the Maywood Public Schools received approval from the New Jersey Department of Education to end the relationship it had established with Hackensack in 1969 and began transitioning incoming ninth graders to Henry P. Becton Regional High School starting with the 2020–21 school year.

== Awards, recognition and rankings ==
The school was the 242nd-ranked public high school in New Jersey out of 339 schools statewide in New Jersey Monthly magazine's September 2014 cover story on the state's "Top Public High Schools," using a new ranking methodology. The school had been ranked 206th in the state of 328 schools in 2012, after being ranked 198th in 2010 out of 322 schools listed. The magazine ranked the school 184th in 2008 out of 316 schools. The school was ranked 203rd in the magazine's September 2006 issue, which surveyed 316 schools across the state. Schooldigger.com ranked the school 266th out of 367 public high schools statewide in its 2009–10 rankings which were based on the combined percentage of students classified as proficient or above proficient on the language arts literacy and mathematics components of the High School Proficiency Assessment (HSPA).

== History ==
Hackensack High School's graduates date from the 1880s, and include Warren Terhune and William J. Snow. The district's first formal high school program began in 1894, with the first building for Hackensack High School constructed in 1897 at First and High streets. The cornerstone for its present location at First and Beech Streets in Hackensack was laid on December 2, 1916. The new building opened to students in March 1918. By 1920, twenty-two Bergen County towns sent their students to Hackensack High School. New wings were built in the 1950s. The 1966 expansion of Hackensack High School encompassed neighboring Beech Street School and extended a two-story bridge over First Street and in 1967 the Beech Street elementary school became the "east wing" of the high school as it stands today.

Students from Emerson had attended the high school as part of a sending/receiving relationship with the Emerson School District that was ended with the completion of Emerson Junior-Senior High School in March 1963. Those students already enrolled in Hackensack completed their attendance in Hackensack through their graduation.

Students from Maywood began attending Hackensack High School in September 1966, after the district ended a longstanding sending relationship under which students attended Bogota High School.

== Sports ==
The Hackensack High School Comets compete in the Big North Conference, which is comprised of public and private high schools in Bergen and Passaic counties, and was established following a reorganization of sports leagues in Northern New Jersey by the New Jersey State Interscholastic Athletic Association (NJSIAA). In the 2009–10 school year the school's athletic teams competed in the North Jersey Tri-County Conference, a conference established on an interim basis to facilitate realignment. Hackensack had been a founding member of the Northern New Jersey Interscholastic League. Hackensack High and Ridgewood High School were the only founding members of the NNJIL to remain in the league, though Hackensack was the only school to remain continuously in the league. With 1,431 students in grades 10–12, the school was classified by the NJSIAA for the 2019–20 school year as Group IV for most athletic competition purposes, which included schools with an enrollment of 1,060 to 5,049 students in that grade range. The football team competes in the Freedom Red division of the North Jersey Super Football Conference, which includes 112 schools competing in 20 divisions, making it the nation's biggest football-only high school sports league. The school was classified by the NJSIAA as Group IV North for football for 2024–2026, which included schools with 893 to 1,315 students. Since the 1912 visit of Halley's Comet, Hackensack's athletic teams have been known as the Comets; the teams were known as the "Colts" before 1912.

The school participates with Lyndhurst High School in a joint ice hockey team in which Paramus High School is the host school / lead agency. The co-op program operates under agreements scheduled to expire at the end of the 2023–24 school year.

The boys' basketball team won the Group III state title in 1945 vs. North Plainfield High School and in 1952 vs. Princeton High School. On February 6, 1925, the Hackensack Comets boys' basketball team won 39–35 against the Passaic High School, ending that school's 159-game winning streak. The ball commemorating this feat is kept in the trophy case in the gym named for that team's captain, Howard Bollerman Sr. (later principal of Hackensack High School). The 1945 team won the state title with a 44–22 win in the championship game played at the Elizabeth Armory against North Plainfield, a team described as "a weak sister in the tourney. Chet Forte led the 1952 team to the Group III title with a 74–59 win against Princeton in the championship game.

The boys soccer team won the Group III state championship in 1949 (awarded by NJSIAA), 1950 (co-champion with Edison High School) and 1954 (awarded by NJSIAA), and won the Group IV title in 1960 (vs. Irvington High School), 1968 (co-champion with Ewing High School), 1969 (as co-champion with Steinert High School) and 1970 (co-champion with Steinert). The 1969 team finished the season with a record of 17–2–1 after the Group IV title game against Steinert ended in a 1–1 tie, making the two teams co-champions. The 2026 Thanksgiving Day game between the two teams will be one of two played in North Jersey (the other being Dumont vs. Tenafly), marking the decline of what had been a more widespread tradition.

The boys' bowling team won the overall state championship in 1961, 1965 and 1989. The program's three state titles are tied for seventh-most in the state.

The school was co-champion of the 1971 Group IV spring / outdoor track and field championship when they shared the title after a tie with Henry Snyder High School and again in 2010 after East Brunswick High School tied Hackensack in the final event

The boys track team won the winter track Meet of Champions in 1974.

The field hockey team won the North I Group IV state sectional title in 1980 and 1997.

The wrestling team won the North I Group IV state sectional title in 1980 and 2013.

The girls volleyball team won the Group IV state championship in 1984 (defeating runner-up Fair Lawn High School in the final match of the playoff tournament) and 2000 (vs. Eastern Regional High School). After dropping the first game, the 1984 team came back to win the Group IV title against Fair Lawn in three games (12–15, 15–2, 15–5) in the playoff finals.

The girls track team won the Group IV indoor state championship in 1987 (as co-champion). The boys track team won the Group IV title in 1988, 1992, 1993 and 1999 (co-champion).

The football team won the North I Group IV state sectional championships in 1992–1996, 1999 and 2000. The team won their first North I Group IV state title in 1992 with a 7–3 win against North Bergen High School in the championship game. The 1993 team finished the season with a 10–1 record and repeated as North I Group IV champion with a 54–27 win against North Bergen, earning the team a second-place ranking statewide from the Asbury Park Press. The team finished the 1994 season unbeaten after winning its third consecutive title with a 27–10 win in the championship game against North Bergen for the third year in a row. A fourth consecutive win in the Borth I Group IV finals against North Bergen in 1996, this time by a score of 7–6, gave the team a 10–1 record for the year. The 1996 team finished the season with an 11–0 record and was ranked 15th in the nation by USA Today. The 2000 team finished the season with a record of 12–0 after defeating Teaneck High School by a score of 21–12 in the North I Group IV championship game at Rutgers Stadium. The HHS homecoming football game has been held annually on Thanksgiving Day against rival Teaneck High School since 1931, alternating each year with each school as host. Hackensack has won 62 of the 85 games through the 2017 season. NJ.com listed the rivalry as 27th best in their 2017 list "Ranking the 31 fiercest rivalries in N.J. HS football." Vince Lombardi was offered $6,000 to coach football at Hackensack High School, but couldn't get out of his contract with St. Cecilia High School in nearby Englewood. Hackensack turned to Tom DellaTorre to coach the football team, he responded by winning 10 league championships. DellaTorre later served as the schools athletic director. Upon his retirement in the early 1980s the football field was renamed "Tom DellaTorre Athletic Field."

The baseball team won the Group IV state championship in 1995 (defeating runner-up Edison High School in the tournament final) and 1997 (vs. Toms River High School North). The team won the program's first state title in 1995 with a 2–1 win against Edison in the Group IV finals. The 1997 team finished the season with 27–7 record after winning the Group IV title with a 5–3 win against Toms River North in the championship game.

The boys track team won the Group IV indoor relay championship in 1999.

The ice hockey team won the McInnis Cup in 2000.

== Demographics ==
In 2017, the graduating class numbered 429, with 46% being Hispanic, 27% being black, 20% being white, and 7% being Asian. Rodrigo Torrejon of The Journal News characterized the school's student body as being "diverse."

== School song ==
The alma mater of Hackensack High School was written by W. Demarest and B. Pratt of the Class of 1918. It is to the tune of the alma mater of New York University, Palisades (used by permission).

== Administration ==
The principal is James Montesano. His core administration team includes four assistant principals.

== Notable alumni ==
- Janet Aulisio, artist whose work has appeared in role-playing games and on the covers of books and magazines
- Brendan A. Burns (1895–1986), U.S. Army major general
- Hector Luis Bustamante (born 1972, class of 1990), actor
- Frank Cannova (1911–2005), hotelier, businessman and entrepreneur
- Barbie Ferreira (born 1996), model and actress
- Chet Forte (1935–1996, class of 1953), television sports pioneer
- Mike Fratello (born 1947, class of 1965), former NBA coach who starred at Hackensack High School as a student and who returned for his first job as an assistant coach after graduating from college
- Navarro Gray (born 1979, class of 1997), lawyer best known for his accomplishments in the entertainment industry, including representing Fetty Wap
- Chet Hanulak (1933–2021, class of 1950), former Cleveland Browns running back
- Austin Lane, college official and chancellor of Southern Illinois University Carbondale
- Melina Matsoukas (born 1981), music video, film, commercial, and television director
- E. Frederic Morrow (1909–1994, class of 1924), the first African American to hold an executive position at the White House, when he served President Dwight Eisenhower as Administrative Officer for Special Projects from 1955 to 1961
- Herman Neilson (1907–1978), college football, college basketball and tennis coach
- Danny Oquendo (born 1987), wide receiver who played for the Maryland Terrapins
- Nellie Morrow Parker (1902–1998), the first African American school teacher in Bergen County, New Jersey, and the namesake of Nellie K. Parker Elementary School
- Stan Pitula (1931–1965), pitcher who played for the Cleveland Indians
- Jorge A. Rod (born 1947), politician who represented the 9th Legislative District in the New Jersey General Assembly from 1982 to 1986
- Gene Saks (1921–2015, class of 1939), Broadway / Hollywood director
- Robert Schmertz (1926–1975), sports owner whose teams included the Portland Trail Blazers and the Boston Celtics
- Chris Smalls (born 1988), labor organizer known for his role in leading Amazon worker organization in the New York City borough of Staten Island
- William J. Snow (1868–1947, class of 1885), major general in the United States Army
- Warren Terhune (1869–1920), United States Navy Commander, and the 13th Governor of American Samoa
- Melissa Trainer (born 1978, class of 1996), astrobiologist
- Theodore Trautwein (1920–2000), judge who sentenced a reporter from The New York Times to 40 days in jail in the "Dr. X" trial of Mario Jascalevich
- Alex Vincent (born 1981 as Alex Vincent LoScialpo, Class of 1999), actor who played Andy Barclay in the film Child's Play and its sequel Child's Play 2
- Spann Watson (1916–2010), Tuskegee Airman serving in World War II who flew over 30 missions for the squadron over North Africa, Italy and Southern Europe
- William B. Widnall (1906–1983, class of 1922), politician who served as a member of the United States House of Representatives for 24 years representing New Jersey's 7th congressional district
- Walter G. Winne (1889–1972, Class of 1906), U.S. Attorney for the District of New Jersey from 1922 to 1928
- Ellen Zavian (born 1963), sports agent and attorney who was the National Football League's first female attorney-agent
- Ken Zisa (born 1954), politician who served as a member of the New Jersey General Assembly from 1994 to 2002, where he represented the 37th Legislative District
