= East Rutherford, New Jersey =

Borough in Bergen County, New Jersey, US

- Borough
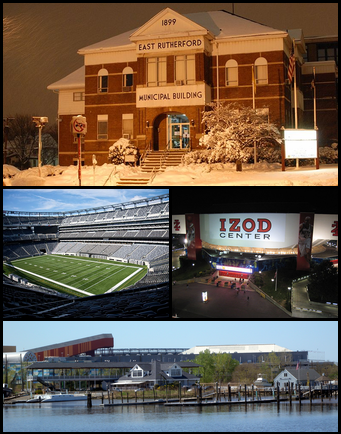
- Top, left to right: East Rutherford Municipal Building, MetLife Stadium, Meadowlands Arena, and Meadowlands Sports Complex

- Seal

- Location of East Rutherford in Bergen County highlighted in red (left). Inset map: Location of Bergen County in New Jersey highlighted in orange (right).

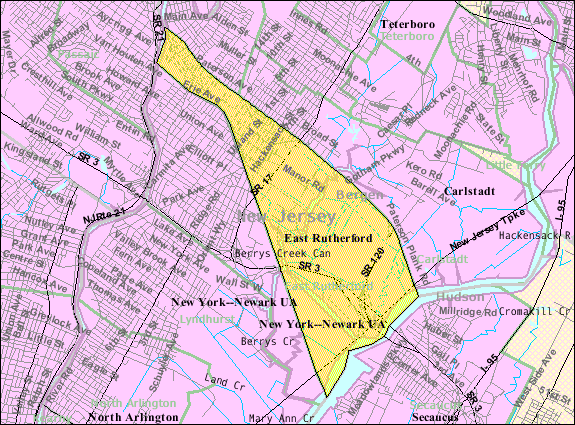
- Census Bureau map of East Rutherford, New Jersey

- Location relative to New York City (yellow region) Location in Bergen County Location in New Jersey Location in the United States
- Coordinates: 40.817097°N 74.085024°W
- Country: United States
- State: New Jersey
- County: Bergen
- Incorporated: April 17, 1889 (as Boiling Springs township)
- Reincorporated: March 28, 1894 (as East Rutherford)

Government
  - Type: Borough
  - Body: Borough Council
  - Mayor: Jeffrey Lahullier (D, term ends December 31, 2027)
  - Municipal clerk: Danielle Lorenc

Area
  - Total: 4.04 sq mi (10.47 km^{2})
  - Land: 3.71 sq mi (9.61 km^{2})
  - Water: 0.33 sq mi (0.85 km^{2}) 8.14%
  - Rank: 295th of 565 in state 20th of 70 in county
- Elevation: 3 ft (0.91 m)

Population (2020)
  - Total: 10,022
  - Estimate (2024): 10,624
  - Rank: 244th of 565 in state 40th of 70 in county
  - Density: 2,699.9/sq mi (1,042.4/km^{2})
  - Rank: 239th of 565 in state 46th of 70 in county
- Time zone: UTC−05:00 (Eastern EST)
  - Summer (DST): UTC−04:00 (Eastern EDT)
- ZIP Code: 07073
- Area codes: 201 and 551
- FIPS code: 3400319510
- GNIS feature ID: 0885201
- School district: East Rutherford School District
- Website: www.eastrutherfordnj.net

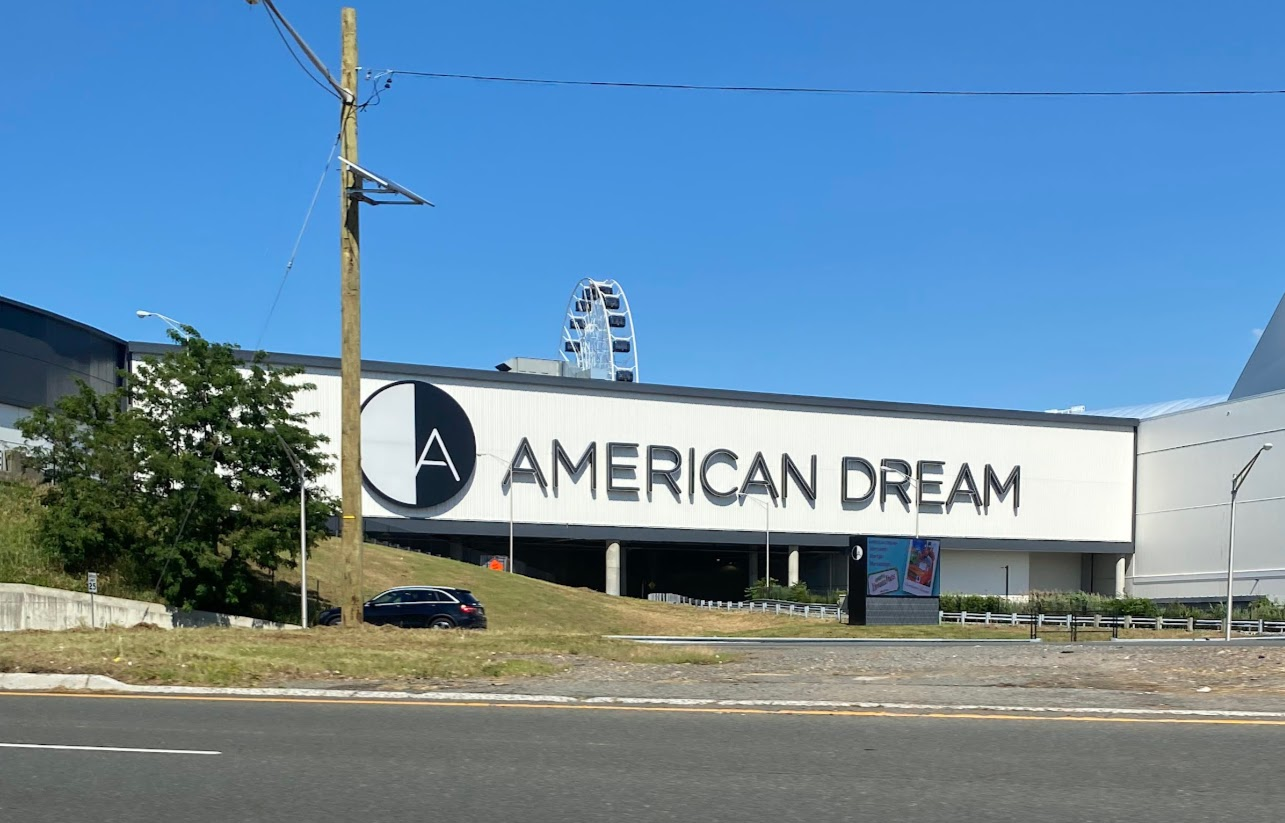
American Dream shopping and entertainment complex hosts approximately 200 commercial tenants as of December 2021.

East Rutherford is a borough in Bergen County, in the U.S. state of New Jersey. It is an inner-ring suburb of New York City, located 7 miles (11 km) west of Midtown Manhattan. As of the 2020 United States census, the borough's population was 10,022, an increase of 1,109 (+12.4%) from the 2010 census count of 8,913, which in turn reflected an increase of 197 (+2.3%) from the 8,716 counted in the 2000 census.

Under the terms of an act of the New Jersey Legislature on April 17, 1889, a portion of the old Union Township was incorporated under the name of Boiling Springs Township. The new township took its name from a spring in the community. On March 28, 1894, the Borough of East Rutherford was created, based on the results of a referendum held the previous day, and Boiling Springs Township was dissolved. While there was no change in its borders, the name and form of government were changed. The borough was the second formed during the "Boroughitis" phenomenon then sweeping through Bergen County, in which 26 boroughs were formed in the county in 1894 alone. The borough was already the site of several industries prior to its incorporation, with the number of industrial firms located in East Rutherford totaling over 50 by 1940.

East Rutherford is the home of the Meadowlands Sports Complex, which includes Meadowlands Arena and MetLife Stadium. MetLife Stadium is home of the New York Giants and New York Jets of the National Football League and hosted Super Bowl XLVIII, which made East Rutherford the smallest city ever to host a Super Bowl. East Rutherford hosted seven matches for the 1994 FIFA World Cup at Giants Stadium and hosted eight matches for the 2026 FIFA World Cup, including the World Cup final, held at MetLife Stadium, also making the borough the smallest-ever host of any of those tournament final games.

The borough is also the site of American Dream, a 3,000,000-square-foot (280,000 m^{2}) shopping center and entertainment complex that opened in October 2019.

== Geography ==
According to the U.S. Census Bureau, the borough had a total area of 4.04 square miles (10.47 km^{2}), including 3.71 square miles (9.61 km^{2}) of land and 0.33 square miles (0.85 km^{2}) of water (8.14%).

East Rutherford is bounded on the north by the boroughs of Carlstadt and Wallington and to the south by the borough of Rutherford in Bergen County; by Secaucus in Hudson County; and by Passaic in Passaic County. The Passaic River is the western boundary, and the Hackensack River is the eastern boundary. The area in which East Rutherford is located is the valley of the Passaic and Hackensack rivers.

Carlton Hill is an unincorporated community located within the township.

== Demographics ==
Historical population
Census	Pop.	Note	%±
1890	1,438		—
1900	2,640		83.6%
1910	4,275		61.9%
1920	5,463		27.8%
1930	7,080		29.6%
1940	7,268		2.7%
1950	7,438		2.3%
1960	7,769		4.5%
1970	8,536		9.9%
1980	7,849		−8.0%
1990	7,902		0.7%
2000	8,716		10.3%
2010	8,913		2.3%
2020	10,022		12.4%
2024 (est.)	10,624	▲	6.0%
Population sources: 1890–1920 1890 1890–1910; 1910–1930 1900–2020; 2000 2010 2020

=== Racial and ethnic composition ===
East Rutherford borough, Bergen County, New Jersey – Racial and ethnic composition Note: the US Census treats Hispanic/Latino as an ethnic category. This table excludes Latinos from the racial categories and assigns them to a separate category. Hispanics/Latinos may be of any race.
Race / Ethnicity (NH = Non-Hispanic)	Pop 2000	Pop 2010	Pop 2020	% 2000	% 2010	% 2020
White alone (NH)	6,410	5,616	5,028	73.54%	63.01%	50.17%
Black or African American alone (NH)	292	336	456	3.35%	3.77%	4.55%
Native American or Alaska Native alone (NH)	3	5	28	0.03%	0.06%	0.28%
Asian alone (NH)	930	1,237	1,612	10.67%	13.88%	16.08%
Native Hawaiian or Pacific Islander alone (NH)	1	2	2	0.01%	0.02%	0.02%
Other race alone (NH)	13	25	99	0.15%	0.28%	0.99%
Mixed race or Multiracial (NH)	139	129	241	1.59%	1.45%	2.40%
Hispanic or Latino (any race)	928	1,563	2,556	10.65%	17.54%	25.50%
Total	8,716	8,913	10,022	100.00%	100.00%	100.00%

=== 2020 census ===
As of the 2020 census, East Rutherford had a population of 10,022. The median age was 37.7 years. 17.8% of residents were under the age of 18 and 14.2% of residents were 65 years of age or older. For every 100 females there were 94.5 males, and for every 100 females age 18 and over there were 93.0 males age 18 and over.

100.0% of residents lived in urban areas, while 0.0% lived in rural areas.

There were 4,306 households in East Rutherford, of which 27.5% had children under the age of 18 living in them. Of all households, 40.9% were married-couple households, 22.3% were households with a male householder and no spouse or partner present, and 28.9% were households with a female householder and no spouse or partner present. About 32.1% of all households were made up of individuals and 10.2% had someone living alone who was 65 years of age or older.

There were 4,585 housing units, of which 6.1% were vacant. The homeowner vacancy rate was 1.2% and the rental vacancy rate was 5.3%.

=== 2010 census ===
The 2010 United States census counted 8,913 people, 3,792 households, and 2,226 families in the borough. The population density was 2,403.2 per square mile (927.9/km^{2}). There were 4,018 housing units at an average density of 1,083.4 per square mile (418.3/km^{2}). The racial makeup was 73.04% (6,510) White, 4.50% (401) Black or African American, 0.22% (20) Native American, 13.93% (1,242) Asian, 0.03% (3) Pacific Islander, 5.83% (520) from other races, and 2.43% (217) from two or more races. Hispanic or Latino residents of any race were 17.54% (1,563) of the population.

Of the 3,792 households, 24.2% had children under the age of 18; 42.9% were married couples living together; 11.6% had a female householder with no husband present and 41.3% were non-families. Of all households, 33.5% were made up of individuals and 11.6% had someone living alone who was 65 years of age or older. The average household size was 2.35 and the average family size was 3.06.

The age distribution showed 18.1% of the population under the age of 18, 8.6% from 18 to 24, 33.2% from 25 to 44, 26.6% from 45 to 64, and 13.5% that was 65 years of age or older. The median age was 37.8 years. For every 100 females, the population had 93.0 males. For every 100 females ages 18 and older there were 92.5 males.

The Census Bureau's 2006–2010 American Community Survey showed that (in 2010 inflation-adjusted dollars) median household income was $62,471 (with a margin of error of +/− $8,225) and the median family income was $71,357 (+/− $10,225). Males had a median income of $57,511 (+/− $8,669) versus $48,502 (+/− $2,269) for females. The per capita income for the borough was $32,467 (+/− $2,752). About 5.9% of families and 6.5% of the population were below the poverty line, including 4.2% of those under age 18 and 13.4% of those age 65 or over.

Same-sex couples headed 19 households in 2010, a decline from the 27 counted in 2000.

=== 2000 census ===
As of the 2000 United States census, there were 8,716 people, 3,644 households, and 2,157 families residing in the borough. The population density was 2,289.1 inhabitants per square mile (883.8/km^{2}). There were 3,771 housing units at an average density of 990.4 per square mile (382.4/km^{2}). The racial makeup of the borough was 79.68% White, 3.72% African American, 0.11% Native American, 10.69% Asian, 0.05% Pacific Islander, 3.21% from other races, and 2.54% from two or more races. Hispanic or Latino residents of any race were 10.65% of the population.

There were 3,644 households, out of which 25.2% had children under the age of 18 living with them, 44.4% were married couples living together, 10.8% had a female householder with no husband present, and 40.8% were non-families. 33.4% of all households were made up of individuals, and 11.6% had someone living alone who was 65 years of age or older. The average household size was 2.35 and the average family size was 3.05.

In the borough, the age distribution of the population shows 19.4% under the age of 18, 7.1% from 18 to 24, 36.5% from 25 to 44, 22.7% from 45 to 64, and 14.3% who were 65 years of age or older. The median age was 38 years. For every 100 females, there were 94.8 males. For every 100 females age 18 and over, there were 93.8 males. The median income for a household in the borough was $50,163, and the median income for a family was $59,583. Males had a median income of $40,798 versus $36,047 for females. The per capita income for the borough was $28,072. About 7.4% of families and 9.6% of the population were below the poverty line, including 10.1% of those under age 18 and 11.6% of those age 65 or over.

== Economy ==
East Rutherford is home to the American Dream shopping mall, the second largest shopping mall in the United States at 3,000,000 square feet (280,000 m^{2}). Completed after more than a decade of stops and starts, the mall was constructed for an estimated $5 million and is more than half entertainment space, including theme-park attractions and recreational facilities, with the remainder devoted to retail at more than 450 stores. The mall is located in Bergen County, the last county with state-mandated Blue Laws which limit retail operations on Sunday, though many of the stores at American Dream are open on Sunday, as the New Jersey Sports and Exposition Authority that owns the site has said that the laws don't apply at the mall.

East Rutherford is home to the Hudson Group, a retailer which operates a chain of newsstands, bookstores, fast food restaurants, and other retail stores chiefly at airports and train stations. Contract manufacturing organization Cambrex Corporation is based in East Rutherford.

The East Rutherford Operations Center handles currency in the area covered by the Federal Reserve Bank of New York, a task that includes removing and destroying 5 million currency notes every day.

The Dawn Bible Students Association moved to East Rutherford in 1944. The organization has a worldwide outreach and publishes many Bible-based books as well as The Dawn magazine.

== Sports ==
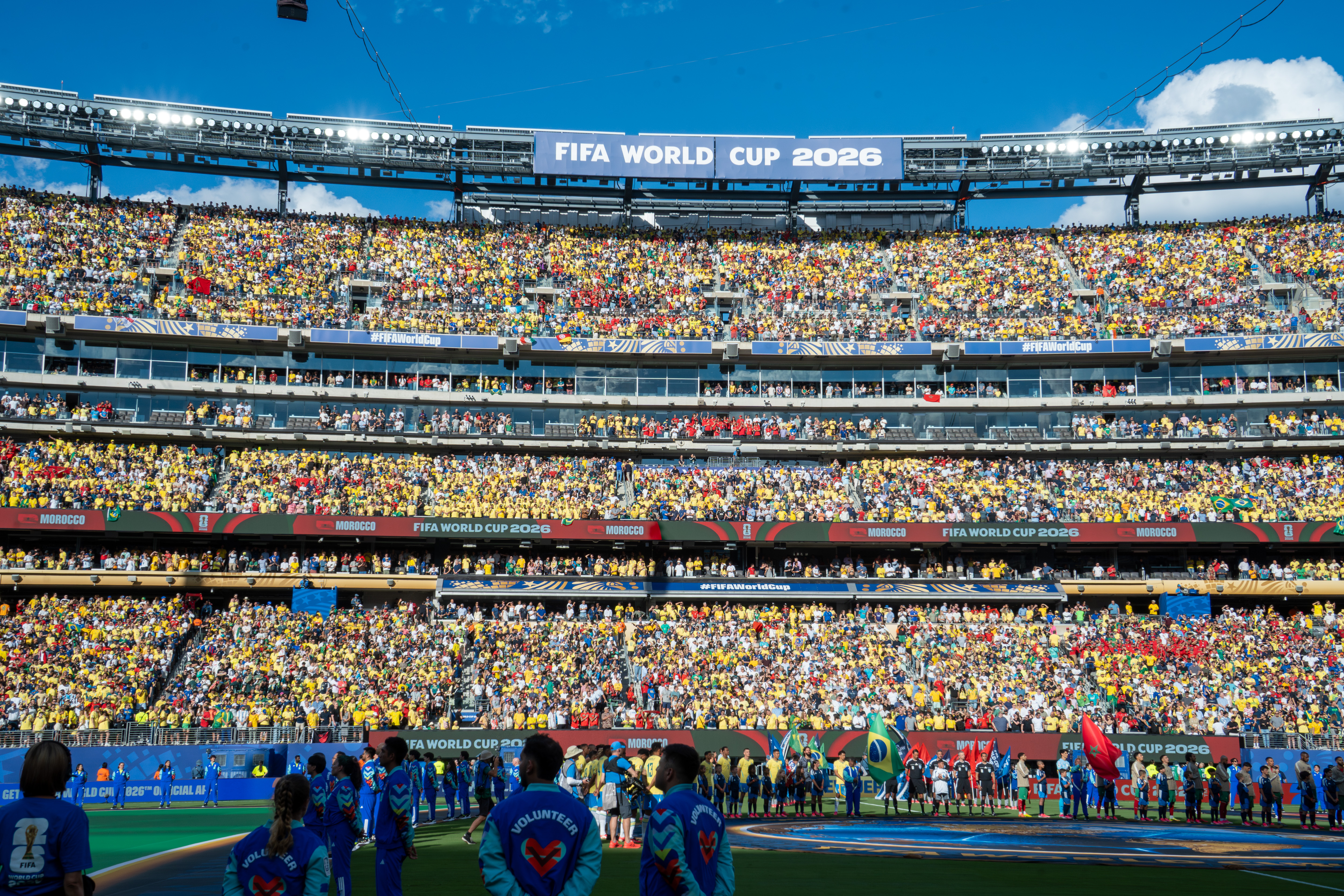
MetLife Stadium during a match between Brazil and Morocco at the 2026 FIFA World Cup.

East Rutherford is the home of the Meadowlands Sports Complex, which includes Meadowlands Arena and MetLife Stadium, and used to be the location of Giants Stadium. The arena is best known as the former home of the New Jersey Devils of the National Hockey League and of the New Jersey Nets of the National Basketball Association, and for hosting college basketball, arena football, concerts, and other events. Among some of the most expensive stadiums ever constructed at a stated cost of $1.6 billion, MetLife Stadium is home of the New York Giants and New York Jets of the National Football League (NFL) and hosted Super Bowl XLVIII, which made East Rutherford the smallest city ever to host a Super Bowl; it was the former home of the New York Guardians of the XFL.

East Rutherford had hosted seven games for the 1994 FIFA World Cup at Giants Stadium, including the semi-final game where Bulgaria lost to Italy, which would go on to lose the finals to Brazil. East Rutherford was one of 16 venues chosen to host games for the 2026 FIFA World Cup, with eight matches including the final on July 19 at MetLife Stadium (which for the purposes of the event will be identified as New York/New Jersey Stadium). The nations of Brazil, France, Germany and England, as well as several other teams played their games at MetLife Stadium.

Giants Stadium, which hosted the Giants and Jets until 2009, was the original home of the New York Red Bulls of Major League Soccer from 1996 (founded as the MetroStars) until they moved in 2010 to Sports Illustrated Stadium in Harrison, New Jersey.

East Rutherford is the only municipality with fewer than 10,000 residents to have been home to five professional sports teams simultaneously, as well as the smallest city to host any professional sports team within its city limits, with a population of around 10,000.

== Government ==
=== Local government ===
East Rutherford is governed under the borough form of New Jersey municipal government, which is used in 218 municipalities (of the 564) statewide, making it the most common form of government in New Jersey. The governing body is comprised of a mayor and a borough council, with all positions elected at-large on a partisan basis as part of the November general election. A mayor is elected directly by the voters to a four-year term of office. The borough council includes six members elected to serve three-year terms on a staggered basis, with two seats coming up for election each year in a three-year cycle. The borough form of government used by East Rutherford is a "weak mayor / strong council" government in which council members act as the legislative body with the mayor presiding at meetings and voting only in the event of a tie. The mayor can veto ordinances subject to an override by a two-thirds majority vote of the council. The mayor makes committee and liaison assignments for council members, and most appointments are made by the mayor with the advice and consent of the council.

As of 2026, East Rutherford's Mayor is Democrat Jeffrey Lahullier, whose term of office ends December 31, 2027. The borough council members are Council President Antonio Segalini (D, 2026), Daniel Alvarez Jr. (D, 2027), George W. Cronk (D, 2028), Jesse L. De Rosa (D, 2026), Michael C. Lorusso (D, 2027) and Dennis E. Monks (D, 2028).

=== Federal, state and county representation ===
East Rutherford is located in the 9th Congressional District and is part of New Jersey's 36th state legislative district.

For the 119th United States Congress, New Jersey's 9th congressional district is represented by Nellie Pou (D, North Haledon)

New Jersey is represented in the United States Senate by Democrats Cory Booker (Newark, term ends 2027) and Andy Kim (Moorestown, term ends 2031). For the 2026–2027 session, the 36th legislative district of the New Jersey Legislature is represented in the State Senate by Paul Sarlo (D, Wood-Ridge) and in the General Assembly by Clinton Calabrese (D, Cliffside Park) and Gary Schaer (D, Passaic).

Bergen County is governed by a directly elected County Executive, with legislative functions performed by a Board of County Commissioners comprised of seven members who are elected at-large to three-year terms in partisan elections on a staggered basis, with either two or three seats coming up for election each November; a Chairman and Vice Chairman are selected from among its seven members at a reorganization meeting held every January. As of 2025, the county executive is James J. Tedesco III (D, Paramus), whose four-year term of office ends December 31, 2026.

Bergen County's Commissioners are Chair Mary J. Amoroso (D, Mahwah, 2025), Vice Chair Steven A. Tanelli (D, North Arlington, 2027), Chair Pro Tem Joan Voss (D, Fort Lee, 2026), Rafael Marte (D, Bergenfield, 2026), Germaine M. Ortiz (D, Emerson, 2025), Thomas J. Sullivan Jr. (D, Montvale, 2025) and Tracy Silna Zur (D, Franklin Lakes, 2027).

Bergen County's elected constitutional officials are Clerk John S. Hogan (D, Northvale, 2026), Sheriff Anthony Cureton (D, Englewood, 2027) and Surrogate Michael R. Dressler (D, Cresskill, 2026).

=== Politics ===
As of March 2011, there were a total of 4,484 registered voters in East Rutherford, of which 1,233 (27.5% vs. 31.7% countywide) were registered as Democrats, 1,190 (26.5% vs. 21.1%) were registered as Republicans and 2,058 (45.9% vs. 47.1%) were registered as Unaffiliated. There were 3 voters registered as Libertarians or Greens. Among the borough's 2010 Census population, 50.3% (vs. 57.1% in Bergen County) were registered to vote, including 61.5% of those ages 18 and over (vs. 73.7% countywide).

Gubernatorial election results for East Rutherford
Year	Republican		Democratic		Third party(ies)	
Year	No.	%	No.	%	No.	%
2025	1,410	43.46%	1,815	55.95%	19	0.59%
2021	1,228	49.72%	1,223	49.51%	19	0.77%
2017	791	41.96%	1,024	54.32%	70	3.71%
2013	1,205	59.45%	785	38.73%	37	1.83%
2009	1,004	48.93%	919	44.79%	129	6.29%
2005	964	42.98%	1,212	54.03%	67	2.99%

In the 2016 presidential election, Democrat Hillary Clinton received 1,918 votes (50.1% vs. 54.2% countywide), ahead of Republican Donald Trump with 1,740 votes (45.5% vs. 41.1% countywide) and other candidates with 169 votes (4.4% vs. 4.6% countywide), among the 3,871 ballots cast by the borough's 5,380 registered voters for a turnout of 71.9% (vs. 72.5% in Bergen County). In the 2012 presidential election, Democrat Barack Obama received 1,859 votes (59.7% vs. 54.8% countywide), ahead of Republican Mitt Romney with 1,340 votes (43.0% vs. 43.5%) and other candidates with 48 votes (1.5% vs. 0.9%), among the 3,115 ballots cast by the borough's 4,845 registered voters, for a turnout of 64.3% (vs. 70.4% in Bergen County). In the 2008 presidential election, Democrat Barack Obama received 1,888 votes (51.8% vs. 53.9% countywide), ahead of Republican John McCain with 1,660 votes (45.5% vs. 44.5%) and other candidates with 54 votes (1.5% vs. 0.8%), among the 3,647 ballots cast by the borough's 4,911 registered voters, for a turnout of 74.3% (vs. 76.8% in Bergen County). In the 2004 presidential election, Democrat John Kerry received 1,641 votes (49.6% vs. 51.7% countywide), ahead of Republican George W. Bush with 1,613 votes (48.7% vs. 47.2%) and other candidates with 30 votes (0.9% vs. 0.7%), among the 3,309 ballots cast by the borough's 4,634 registered voters, for a turnout of 71.4% (vs. 76.9% in the whole county).

Presidential elections results
Year	Republican	Democratic
2024	50.0% 2,118	47.3% 2,001
2020	43.6% 1,936	54.5% 2,420
2016	45.5% 1,740	50.1% 1,918
2012	43.0% 1,340	59.7% 1,859
2008	45.5% 1,660	51.8% 1,888
2004	48.7% 1,613	49.6% 1,641

In the 2013 gubernatorial election, Republican Chris Christie received 59.4% of the vote (1,205 cast), ahead of Democrat Barbara Buono with 38.7% (785 votes), and other candidates with 1.8% (37 votes), among the 2,111 ballots cast by the borough's 4,596 registered voters (84 ballots were spoiled), for a turnout of 45.9%. In the 2009 gubernatorial election, Republican Chris Christie received 1,004 votes (48.2% vs. 45.8% countywide), ahead of Democrat Jon Corzine with 919 votes (44.1% vs. 48.0%), Independent Chris Daggett with 112 votes (5.4% vs. 4.7%) and other candidates with 17 votes (0.8% vs. 0.5%), among the 2,082 ballots cast by the borough's 4,709 registered voters, yielding a 44.2% turnout (vs. 50.0% in the county).

United States Senate election results for East Rutherford1
Year	Republican		Democratic		Third party(ies)	
Year	No.	%	No.	%	No.	%
2024	1,798	46.36%	1,961	50.57%	119	3.07%
2018	1,212	43.43%	1,450	51.95%	129	4.62%
2012	1,156	39.40%	1,711	58.32%	67	2.28%
2006	1,048	46.50%	1,161	51.51%	45	2.00%

United States Senate election results for East Rutherford2
Year	Republican		Democratic		Third party(ies)	
Year	No.	%	No.	%	No.	%
2020	1,770	41.36%	2,402	56.13%	107	2.50%
2014	819	43.80%	1,002	53.58%	49	2.62%
2013	517	47.87%	554	51.30%	9	0.83%
2008	1,425	44.64%	1,716	53.76%	51	1.60%

== Education ==
Public school students in pre-kindergarten through eighth grade attend the East Rutherford School District. As of the 2023–24 school year, the district, comprised of three schools, had an enrollment of 768 students and 81.9 classroom teachers (on an FTE basis), for a student–teacher ratio of 9.4:1. Schools in the district (with 2023–24 enrollment data from the National Center for Education Statistics) are McKenzie School with 376 students in grades PreK–3, Lincoln School with 153 students in grades 4–5, Alfred S. Faust School with 232 students in grades 6–8.

For grades ninth through twelfth grades, public school students attend the Becton Regional High School in East Rutherford, which serves high school students from both Carlstadt and East Rutherford as part of the Carlstadt-East Rutherford Regional School District, together with students from Maywood, who attend as part of a sending/receiving relationship. As of the 2023–24 school year, the high school had an enrollment of 821 students and 61.5 classroom teachers (on an FTE basis), for a student–teacher ratio of 13.4:1. Seats on the high school district's ten-member board of education are allocated based on the population of the constituent municipalities, with five seats allocated to East Rutherford.

Public school students from the borough, and all of Bergen County, are eligible to attend the secondary education programs offered by the Bergen County Technical Schools, which include the Bergen County Academies in Hackensack, and the Bergen Tech campus in Teterboro or Paramus. The district offers programs on a shared-time or full-time basis, with admission based on a selective application process and tuition covered by the student's home school district.

== Emergency services ==
=== Police ===
The East Rutherford Police Department (ERPD) serves as the primary law enforcement agency for the borough, providing comprehensive public safety, crime prevention, and emergency response services. Operating on a 24-hour basis, the department is tasked with protecting a resident population of approximately 9,000 while simultaneously managing the significant logistical and security challenges posed by the Meadowlands Sports Complex and the American Dream entertainment and retail complex. Due to the presence of these major regional venues and the borough’s strategic position at the intersection of critical transit corridors—including Route 3, Route 17, Route 120, and the New Jersey Turnpike—the ERPD maintains a high state of operational readiness to accommodate large-scale traffic management and public safety demands.

The department is structured into several specialized components, with the Patrol Division serving as its core. This division utilizes a 12-hour shift system to conduct routine community policing, rapid emergency response, and proactive traffic enforcement. Supporting these field operations is a Detective Bureau dedicated to investigative follow-up, alongside a Traffic Division that manages the complex flow of vehicles through the borough’s high-traffic areas. Administrative oversight and operational integrity are maintained through a Records Bureau and an Internal Affairs unit, ensuring that the department adheres to New Jersey Civil Service standards and professional accountability.

In addition to its localized duties, the ERPD operates a centralized Dispatch Center that provides continuous communication and emergency coordination for police, fire, and emergency medical services within the jurisdiction. Recognizing the complexity of its service area, the department frequently engages in mutual aid agreements with neighboring municipal agencies, as well as county and state law enforcement entities. This collaborative approach ensures that the borough is integrated into a broader regional security framework, allowing for the effective deployment of resources during major events or significant public safety incidents. The Chief of Police is Dennis M. Rivelli.

=== Fire ===
The East Rutherford Fire Department (ERFD) is an all-volunteer fire department. The ERFD was organized in 1894 and consists of a chief and three assistant chiefs. There are three fire stations. The department is staffed by eighty fully trained firefighters. The ERFD utilizes two Engines, a Ladder truck, a Heavy Rescue, and a Quint. The ERFD also provides emergency medical service to the borough.

- Engine 1 2008 Sutphen 1750/750/20F
- Engine 2 2008 Sutphen 1750/750/20F
- Engine 3 2008 Sutphen 2000/500/75' Midmount Quint
- Ladder 1 2008 Sutphen 2000/300/100' Aerial Tower
- Rescue 4 2010 International/Sutphen 500/300/20F

== Transportation ==
=== Roads and highways ===
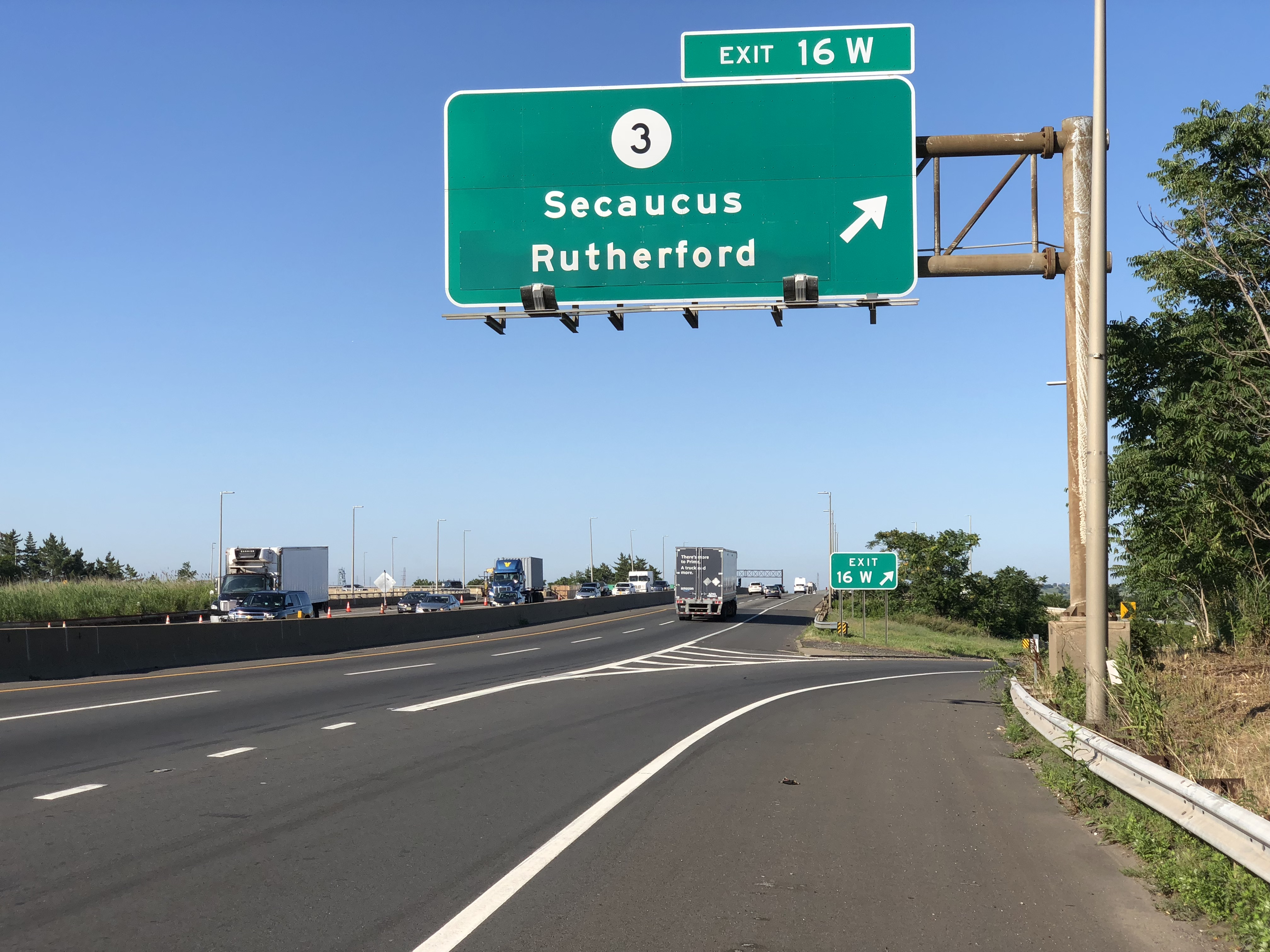
Interstate 95, the New Jersey Turnpike's Western Spur, heading southbound in East Rutherford

As of May 2010, the borough had a total of 30.53 miles (49.13 km) of roadways, of which 20.21 miles (32.52 km) were maintained by the municipality, 4.20 miles (6.76 km) by Bergen County and 4.44 miles (7.15 km) by the New Jersey Department of Transportation and 1.68 miles (2.70 km) by the New Jersey Turnpike Authority.

State Routes include Route 17, Route 120 and Route 3. The only interstate that passes through and serves East Rutherford is Interstate 95 (the New Jersey Turnpike Western Spur) at Exit 16W.

=== Public transportation ===
Rutherford station, which is located on the Rutherford – East Rutherford border, provides train service on NJ Transit's Bergen County Line. The Meadowlands station offers service on the Meadowlands Rail Line, which began in June 2009, providing access between the Meadowlands Sports Complex and Secaucus Junction, and from there to other NJ Transit lines with trains operating before and after games and other events at the complex.

NJ Transit buses include the 160, 163, and 164 routes serving the Port Authority Bus Terminal in Midtown Manhattan; the 76 to Newark; and local service on the 703 route.

== Universal Oil Products Superfund Site ==
A portion of land within East Rutherford along Route 17 is designated by the Environmental Protection Agency as the Universal Oil Products Superfund Site. The land was the site of several industrial facilities between 1930 and 1979, with the operation of solvent recovery and wastewater treatment facilities between 1956 and 1971 resulting in chemical seepage into the surrounding soil, water, and marshlands. In 1983, the EPA would add a 75-acre (30 ha) plot of land to the Superfund program's National Priorities List. Early investigations into the site showed the presence of polychlorinated biphenyls and polycyclic aromatic hydrocarbons in soil samples, in addition to levels of lead totaling up to 14,100 parts per million (ppm).

Cleanup actions began in 1990, with a plan formalized in 1993. The plan divided the land into two portions, Operable Unit 1 and Operable Unit 2, or uplands and lowlands respectively. Cleanup efforts were carried out through 2006, and involved the removal of more than 6,800 cubic yards (5,200 m^{3}) of PCP contaminated soil and 7,000 cubic yards (5,400 m^{3}) of soil contaminated with volatile organic compounds. Cleanup efforts also included the treatment of approximately 5,600,000 US gallons (21,000,000 L; 4,700,000 imp gal) of groundwater, as well as the installation of an impermeable cap over soil with lead concentration exceeding 600 ppm.

As a result of the organization's fifth five-year review in 2021, the EPA would state the following year that no further cleanup was required at the Universal Oil Products site. A sixth five-year review was published on March 30, 2026, stating that existing remedies were continuing to function as expected.

== Notable people ==
People who were born in, residents of, or otherwise closely associated with East Rutherford include:

- Carol Arthur (1935–2020), actress, mainly recognizable as playing supporting roles in films produced by Mel Brooks
- E. J. Barthel (born 1985), fullback who played for the Las Vegas Locomotives of the United Football League
- Ernest Cuneo (1905–1988), lawyer, newspaperman, author and intelligence liaison, who played two seasons in the NFL for the Orange Tornadoes and the Brooklyn Dodgers
- Fireman Ed (born 1959, nickname of Edwin M. Anzalone), superfan of the New York Jets
- Alfred Byrd Graf (1901–2001), botanist known for his richly illustrated books on the subject of plants
- Henry Helstoski (1925–1999), represented New Jersey's 9th congressional district, served as councilman of East Rutherford in 1956 and as mayor from 1957 to 1965
- Harold C. Hollenbeck (born 1938), politician who represented New Jersey in the United States House of Representatives from 1977 to 1983
- Henry Hook (1955–2015), crossword creator
- Bobby Jones (born 1972), former pitcher who played for the New York Mets
- Martin Kilson (1931–2019), political scientist who was the first black academic to be appointed a full professor at Harvard University
- Jim Powers (born 1958), retired professional wrestler best known for his appearances with the World Wrestling Federation from 1987 to 1994
- Diane Ruggiero (born 1970), screenwriter for Veronica Mars
- Patty Shwartz (born 1961), is a United States Circuit Judge of United States Court of Appeals for the Third Circuit
- Dick Vitale (born 1939), sports broadcaster who attended high school and coached at his alma mater, East Rutherford High School; inducted into the East Rutherford Hall of Fame in 1985

== Sources ==
- Municipal Incorporations of the State of New Jersey (according to Counties) prepared by the Division of Local Government, Department of the Treasury (New Jersey); December 1, 1958
- Clayton, W. Woodford; and Nelson, Nelson. History of Bergen and Passaic Counties, New Jersey, with Biographical Sketches of Many of its Pioneers and Prominent Men. Philadelphia: Everts and Peck, 1882.
- Harvey, Cornelius Burnham (ed.), Genealogical History of Hudson and Bergen Counties, New Jersey. New York: New Jersey Genealogical Publishing Co., 1900.
- Van Valen, James M. History of Bergen County, New Jersey. New York: New Jersey Publishing and Engraving Co., 1900.
- Westervelt, Frances A. (Frances Augusta), 1858–1942, History of Bergen County, New Jersey, 1630–1923, Lewis Historical Publishing Company, 1923.
