= Leonia High School =

High school in Bergen County, New Jersey, US

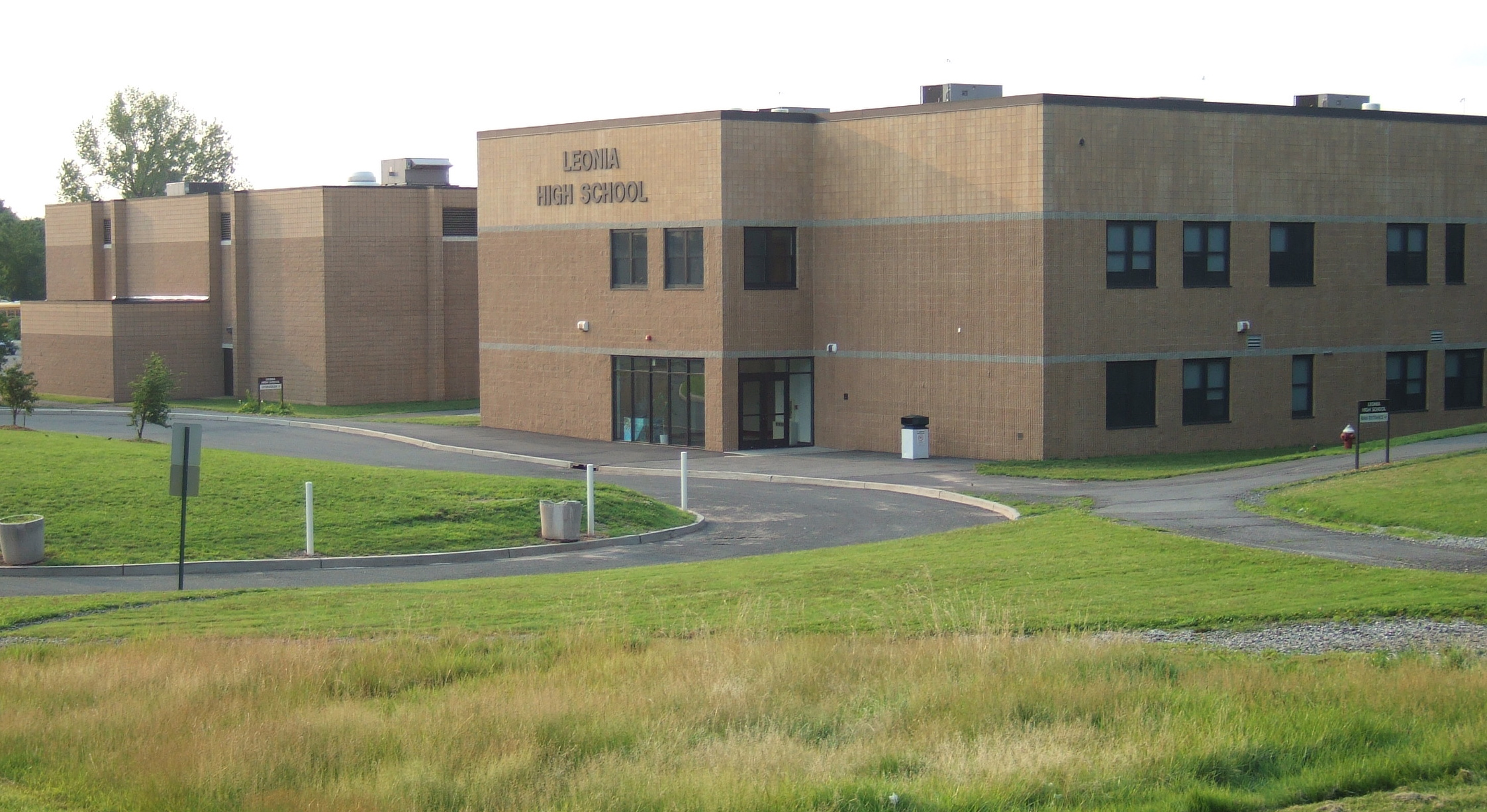

Location
- 100 Christie Heights Street; Leonia, Bergen County, New Jersey 07605; United States; 40.869355°N 73.987778°W

Information
- Type: Public high school
- Established: 1912
- School district: Leonia Public Schools
- NCES School ID: 340852000534
- Principal: Charles Kalender
- Faculty: 62.4 FTEs
- Grades: 9–12
- Enrollment: 802 (as of 2024–25)
- Student to teacher ratio: 12.9:1
- Colors: Maroon and gray
- Athletics conference: North Jersey Interscholastic Conference
- Team name: Lions
- Newspaper: The Leonian
- Yearbook: Lion's Pride
- Alumni: LHS Alumni website
- Website: lhs.leoniaschools.org

Leonia High School is a four-year comprehensive public high school serving students in ninth through twelfth grade from the Borough of Leonia in Bergen County, in the U.S. state of New Jersey, operating as part of the Leonia Public Schools. Students from Edgewater attend the school as part of a sending/receiving relationship with the Edgewater Public Schools.

As of the 2024–25 school year, the school had an enrollment of 802 students and 62.4 classroom teachers (on an FTE basis), for a student–teacher ratio of 12.9:1. There were 193 students (24.1% of enrollment) eligible for free lunch and 36 (4.5% of students) eligible for reduced-cost lunch.

Leonia High School was begun in 1912, when the borough became one of relatively few municipalities in Bergen County to have a high school. During its early years, the school attracted students from seven other school districts in the area, who attended on a tuition basis. The original school building was opened in 1913; expansions to the physical plant were made in 1917, 1937, 1946, and 1963. The school was experiencing severe overcrowding by the 1970s, and after two boroughwide referendums to build a new school failed, a third was passed. The present Leonia High School building was opened in 1977, with the original building being repurposed as Leonia Middle School.

== History ==
=== Founding and opening ===
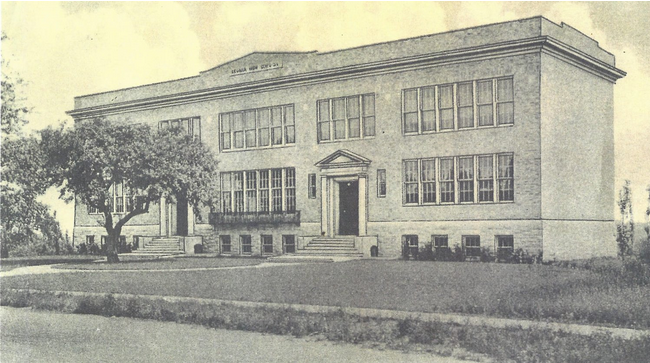
The initial portion of the original Leonia High School building, facing Christie Heights Street in 1913, the year of its opening

By the early 20th century, Leonia was growing with the construction of new homes, many of them built by the Leonia Heights Land Company, which advertised Leonia as "the Athens of New Jersey" due in part to its convenient location to Columbia University. During 1912, the Leonia Board of Education approved the creation of a high school, and in April of that year, the town approved a $65,000 bond issue (equal to $2.2 million in 2025) to buy a 4-acre (1.6 ha) plot of land and build the district's original high school facility on it. The land had previously been a farm. Leonia High School was established in 1912, with students attending classes in the borough's elementary school at first before a separate high school building was completed.

The new building had its cornerstone laid at ceremonies held in December 1912; it was completed in April 1913, with a facade oriented towards Christie Heights Street near Broad Avenue. By May 1913, Leonia High School was fielding a team for baseball in interscholastic competition. The new high school opened in September 1913 and had modern facilities for that era. A formal dedication ceremony for the new school was held on October 17, 1913. Leonia became one of only about a dozen municipalities in all of Bergen County with their own high schools.

=== Early years ===
In this era, continuing on to secondary school was not legally required and many children instead entered the workforce. In order for the high school to have a solid enough financial basis, pupils from several nearby communities in Bergen County were invited to attend it on a tuition-paying basis. (The tuition would typically be paid for by the sending town, not the parents of the pupils involved.) A trolley line ran along Broad Avenue at the time and this enabled students from outside Leonia to reach the high school in a convenient manner. In all, there were seven school districts sending high school pupils to Leonia on a tuition basis. Of the initial student population at the high school of 73 students, only 23 were from Leonia.

Bogota was one of those initial municipalities that sent students; by 1915, there were 46 Bogota students attending Leonia High School. Maywood was another early town, although the relationship ended in the early 1920s. Palisades Park was sending students to Leonia as of at least the 1920s and 1930s, while Ridgefield was sending as of at least the early 1930s. And for a while in the 1930s, Edgewater students attended Leonia High School on a tuition basis. These relationships could change over time, as towns switched arrangements or built their own high schools. Other towns that sent students to Leonia High School at some point were Fort Lee and Teaneck.

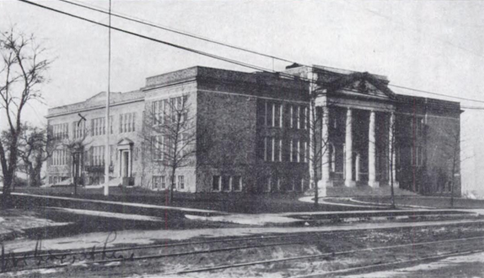
The original high school building, showing the added Broad Avenue facade c. 1919; the trolley line along Broad Avenue is also visible

Enrollment in the school increased rapidly; indeed, the town's population, which had about doubled between 1900 and 1910, doubled again by 1920. An addition was built onto the east side of the school in 1917, that featured a larger facade which was oriented directly onto Broad Avenue. Land immediately adjacent to the school was acquired for a football field in 1926 and dedicated in 1928. Another addition, this time onto the west side of the school, was built in 1937, and included a lunchroom; this new wing was a product of one or both of the New Deal agencies, the Public Works Administration and the Works Progress Administration.

=== Post-war era ===
In 1945, the Board of Education proposed the addition of a new gymnasium that would cost $275,000 (equivalent to $4.9 million in 2025) and would be made available to town residents for outside recreation activities. (The Board sought public support for the project by describing it as a war memorial that would be of "practical benefit" to veterans and their families.) Construction was begun in 1946, and continued into 1947 before being completed.

Following the 1957–58 school year, Palisades Park and Ridgefield stopped sending students to Leonia High School. Palisades Park decided to send its students to Cliffside Park High School and Ridgefield was in the process of building Ridgefield Memorial High School. As part of replacing the tuition income from these two towns, Leonia High School began receiving students from Edgewater again in 1958, a relationship that continues to this day. (Edgewater had been sending its students to Dwight Morrow High School in Englewood.) In an opposite flow, some Leonia students also went at least part time to Bergen County Vocational-Technical High School.

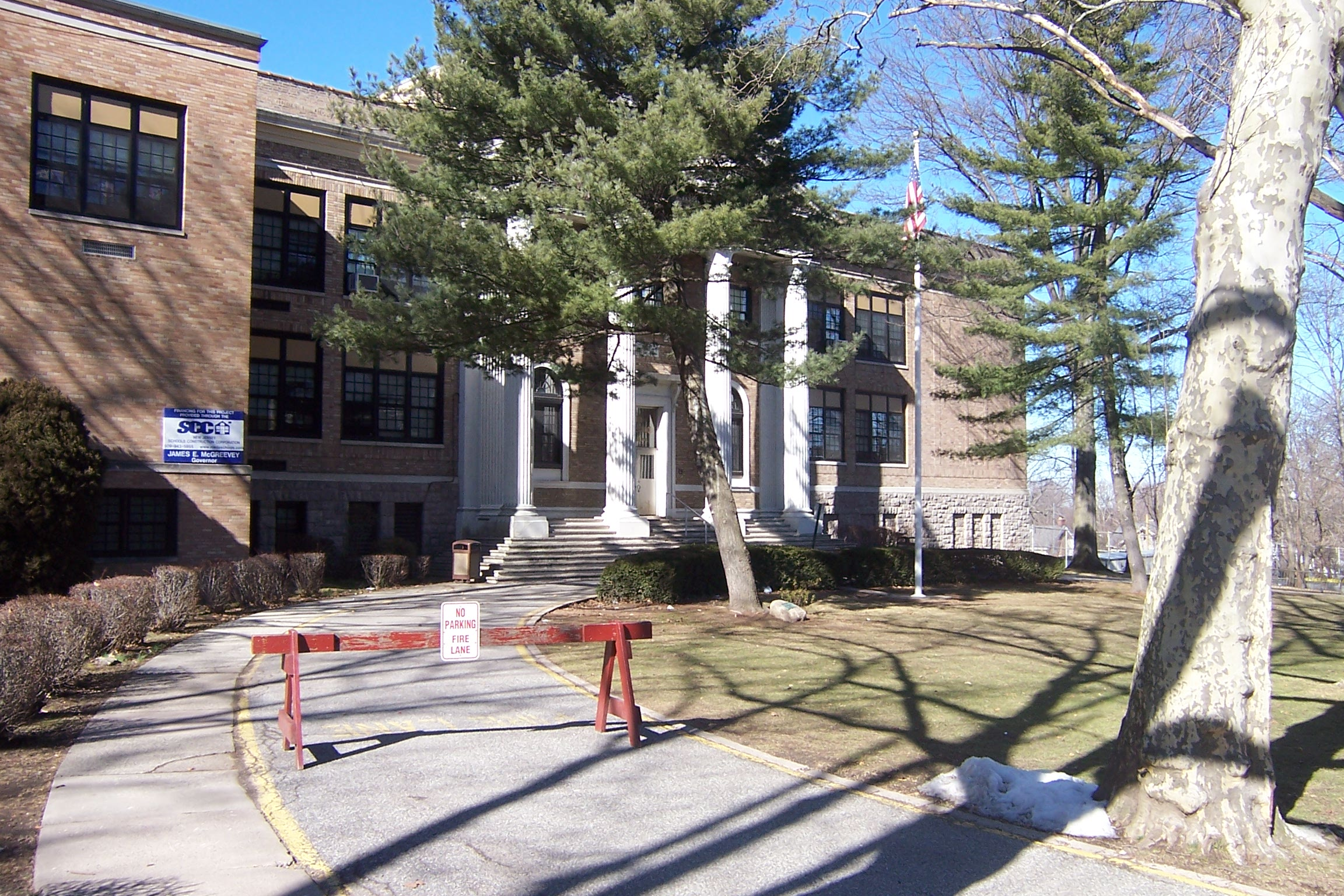
The original high school building, showing the Broad Avenue facade and the southeast corner extension on the left side

An expansion and modernization program costing $335,000 (equivalent to $3.6 million in 2025) was approved by a wide margin in a borough referendum in 1961. Completed in 1963, the expansion consisted of a new wing on the southeast corner, one that housed the enlarged school library and several classrooms.

=== Overcrowding and referendums ===
During these years, Leonia had no middle school; the Anna C. Scott Elementary School served grades K through 7, after which, in a transition that the school system itself characterized as "abrupt", students would move to the high school for grades 8 through 12. Additional students arrived at the high school in grade 9, where they came from St. John the Evangelist School in Leonia, a Catholic school which for many years taught K through 8. Then more students arrived in grade 10, the grade at which Edgewater sending began its sending in that era.

By the mid-1960s, it was clear that the physical plant of Leonia High School was no longer adequate, and the 1965 report of the Middle States Association of Colleges and Secondary Schools put the board on notice accordingly by giving it a provisional three-year accreditation in place of the usual five years. There were many problems: the shared, cramped student lockers; a small auditorium; inadequate laboratory space for sciences; and useless time being spent in study halls. The music room could only hold half the school band at any given time. Nevertheless, efforts to improve the level of academics carried on; from the early days, the faculty of Leonia High School often had connections to Teachers College at Columbia University, and the district was part of the Columbia University Teacher's College Metropolitan School Study Council, which provided the faculty with various research materials. During the late 1960s and early 1970s, a collaboration with Columbia resulted in the advanced, experimental Secondary School Mathematics Curriculum Improvement Study series of math courses being taught at the school.

Leonia was known for the artists and intellectuals who lived there, and while there were indeed some Columbia University professors who were residents, there were not as many as some people imagined; plenty of other kinds of people lived in the town, especially from the 1940s on. In particular, fully one-eighth of the population were senior citizens on fixed incomes. From the 1940s on, referendums for building proposals in the borough had a history of often not passing.

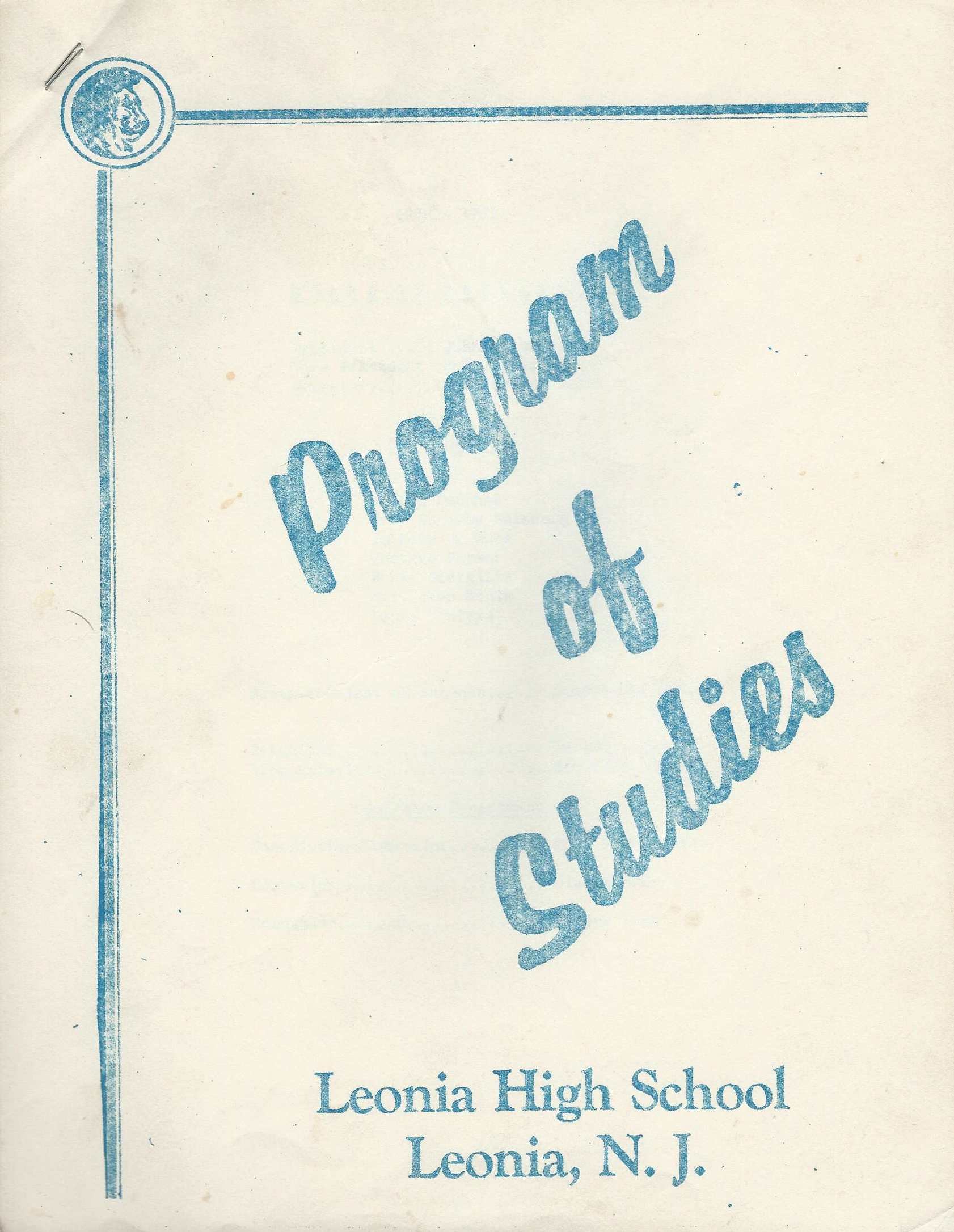
Program of Studies, 1970–1971

School administrators explored alternative ideas to relieve Leonia's overcrowding, in particular joining another town and becoming a regional school district. Feelers were put out to a number of surrounding towns during 1968, and discussions with one, Bogota, encompassing full K–12 regionalization, became quite serious and were the subject of assessment reports and public meetings. But the Bogota proposal would require new building too, and by 1970 the Leonia board had dropped the idea.

The overcrowding situation grew critical; in 1971, the third floor of the school was condemned as unsafe for instructional use. In one publicized case, a 150-square-foot (14 m^{2}) windowless, poorly ventilated room in the basement, with student desks crammed together, was being used daily for five classes in mathematics and other subjects. Whereas the school had only been designed for 500 pupils, by 1972 there were over 800 students coming to it.

In June 1972, a $5.1 million (equivalent to $39.3 million in 2025) bond referendum to build a new high school was put up for a boroughwide vote, but it went down to a narrow defeat. Undeterred, the Board of Education put the exact same proposal up for another vote in September 1972, hoping to sway enough minds to get approval. But it went down to defeat again, this time by a more substantial margin.

After surveying voter wishes, the Board of Education revised its proposal for a new high school, producing one with a lower cost figure of $4 million (equivalent to $26.1 million in 2025). This encountered some opposition from unexpected directions: progressive citizens and sitting and former board members who feared a new school would subsume the nascent, offsite Leonia Alternative High School, or who favored a less traditional approach to school buildings. Also threatening to oppose the referendum were sixth- and seventh-grade parents in the grade school who were unhappy with the school system's short-term handling of overcrowding there following an August 1974 fire that destroyed a wing of that facility. By then, many Bergen County municipalities were rejecting referendums designed to overhaul or replace aging infrastructure, with inflation of that era being an overriding economic concern. Nonetheless, put up for a vote in October 1974, the referendum passed, a result that The Record called "all the more surprising following bitter dissension this fall among a number of factions involved in the school issue."

=== New building ===
Leonia High School opened at its current location in January 1977, after multiple issues with subcontractors led to several delays from the original planned opening in September at the start of the school year. (The old building was being repurposed as Leonia's middle school, and the double sessions of both schools led to such disarray that there was a large-scale student walk-out at one point.) Constructed at a final cost of $4.5 million (equivalent to $25.5 million in 2025) and offering 50 percent more space than its predecessor, the building served 650 students, including 140 from Edgewater.

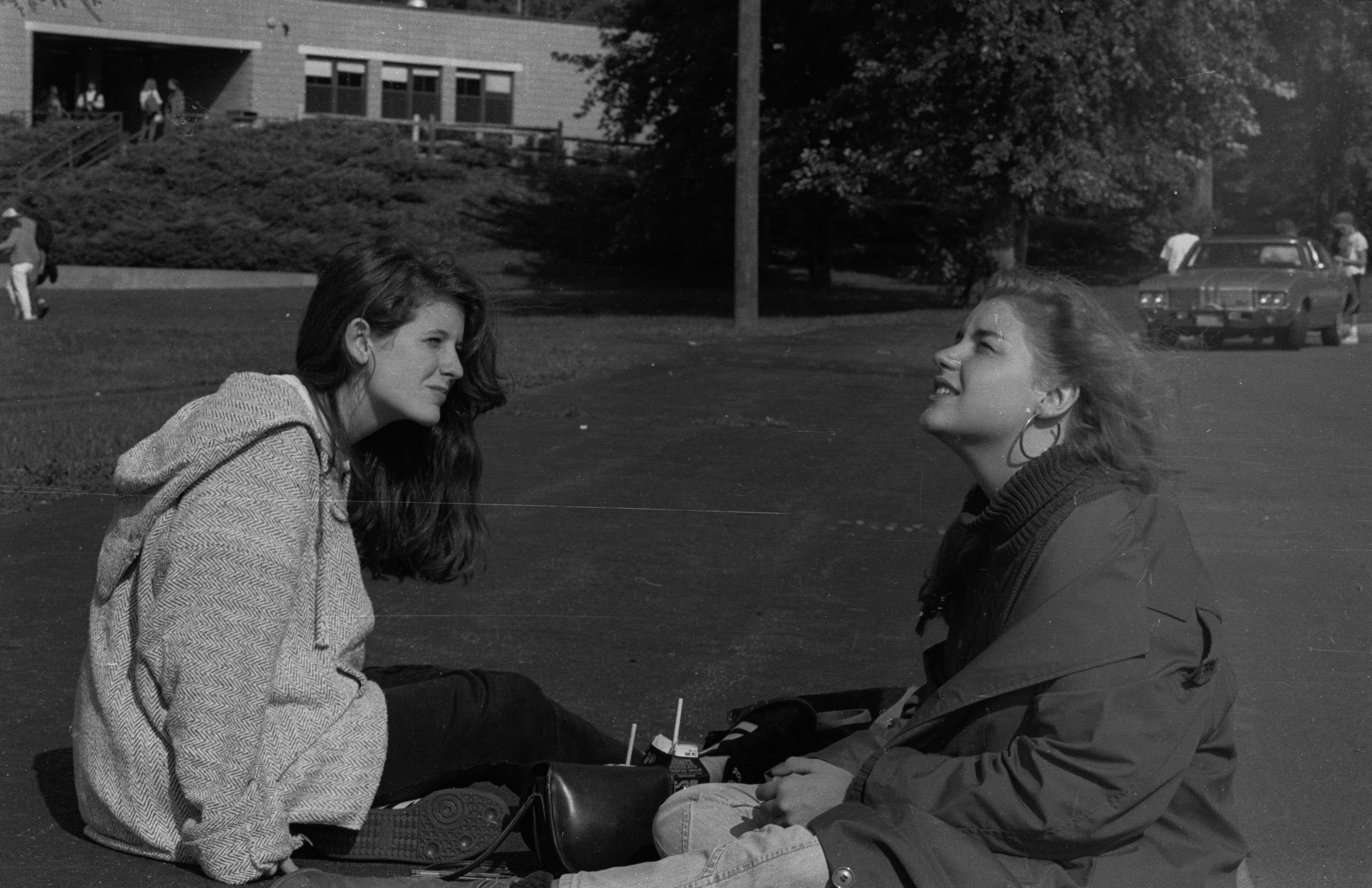
Scene outside new high school building, 1990

During the mid-1980s, there was a reduction in enrollment for a while; thoughts about regionalization again took place, however Leonians preferred home rule and home schools . But the demographics of Leonia changed over time, with a large number of Korean American families and businesses moving into town. A $4.9 million (equivalent to $10.4 million in 2025) bond issue passed by the residents in 1995 provided an upgrade of computers and network connectivity for instructional use. Gradually the older population in Leonia turned over, with younger residents with families moving in.

Moreover, the demographics of Edgewater were rapidly changing; formerly a town populated by factory workers that had a rough-and-tumble reputation, the local industries were being replaced by expensive condominiums filled with executives and other white-collar types working across the river in Manhattan. Their families were filling up Edgewater schools and, when old enough, Leonia schools; by 1995, around a quarter of the students were from Edgewater. The growth in Edgewater residences kept going; by the early 2010s, the percentage had risen to about 30 percent, and by 2017, some 40 percent of students in Leonia High School were from Edgewater. As of the late 2010s, Edgewater was the fastest-growing municipality in northern New Jersey.

Accordingly, an addition to the high school was completed in 2002, using funding from a school-system-wide $6.1 million (equivalent to $11.8 million in 2025) referendum that was passed in 1999. During 2009 and 2010, the high school building had its entire roof replaced, its HVAC system redone, and solar panels added. The work had been approved as part of a $20.3 million (equivalent to $30.5 million in 2025) referendum for similar change for all three Leonia school buildings, a referendum that had passed even though it was being held during the difficult conditions of the Great Recession. In 2017, construction began on a $7.6 million (equivalent to $10.0 million in 2025) addition to the high school to add a culinary academy and a number of classrooms. The expansion was funded by multi-year school district savings rather than calling a referendum. The college-preparatory academy was part of a trend of old-fashioned home economics programs being updated to account for increased student interest due to competitive cooking shows on television. The addition was completed in 2019.

The hospitality and culinary academy was another in a series of academy programs in various areas that the school had begun adding in the 2000s. These academies grouped interested students in smaller cohorts in order to pursue potential career paths in combination with specific experience outside the classroom environment. By the 2020s, Leonia High School would also offer academies in mathematics and science, business, humanities, music and arts, and vocational trades.

== Awards, recognition and rankings ==
Leonia High School has periodically gone through the accreditation process from the Middle States Association of Colleges and Secondary Schools, at least since the 1940s.

In 1944, the accreditation report from Middle States Association noted the lack of adequate facilities for physical education. In 1953, the accreditation report gave Leonia High School a positive assessment, praising the students, the teachers and other staff, and the overall cooperative atmosphere, and noting the low rate of drop-outs. It did say that more elective classes were needed. In 1965, the accreditation report gave Leonia High School an overall score of 3.8 out of 5, praising the quality of the students and the effectiveness of most of the academic programs, but saying that the biggest problem was that the physical facilities of the school were inadequate.

By 1953, some 55 percent of the high school students were going on to college, a figure that increased to 70 percent by 1965. By the 1990s, this figure had increased to around 90 percent.

In the 2011 "Ranking America's High Schools" issue by The Washington Post, the school was ranked 14th in New Jersey and 657th nationwide.

The school was the 94th-ranked public high school in New Jersey out of 339 schools statewide in New Jersey Monthly magazine's September 2014 cover story on the state's "Top Public High Schools", using a new ranking methodology. The school had been ranked 52nd in the state of 328 schools in 2012, after being ranked 49th in 2010 out of 322 schools listed. The magazine ranked the school 51st in 2008 out of 316 schools. The school was ranked 67th in the magazine's September 2006 issue, which included 316 schools across the state.

Schooldigger.com ranked the school as 174th out of 376 public high schools statewide in its 2010 rankings (a decrease of 4 positions from the 2009 rank) which were based on the combined percentage of students classified as proficient or above proficient on the language arts literacy and mathematics components of the High School Proficiency Assessment (HSPA).

Niche Ranked the school 35th of 406 on its list of Best College Prep Public High Schools in New Jersey and 69th of 425 in its ranking of Best Public High Schools.

In 2021, U.S. News & World Report ranked the school 56th in New Jersey, 156th in the New York City metropolitan area and 1,331st nationwide.

== Extracurricular activities ==
In 1957, the school's chess team was the New Jersey high school team champion, winning the Father Casimir J. Finley Trophy.

=== Academic competition ===
Leonia has had an active quiz bowl team for decades. In January 1966, for instance, the team placed a close second to The Wheatley School of Old Westbury, New York on the television show It's Academic. In April 2017, Leonia won the Junior Varsity National Championship title for the Small School Division of the National History Bowl, led by Nathan Finn, who was the 2016 Junior Varsity New Jersey History Bee State Champion.

=== Athletics ===
The Leonia High School Lions participate in the North Jersey Interscholastic Conference, which is comprised of small-enrollment schools in Bergen, Hudson, Morris and Passaic counties, and was created following a reorganization of sports leagues in Northern New Jersey by the New Jersey State Interscholastic Athletic Association (NJSIAA). Prior to the realignment that took effect in the fall of 2010, Leonia was a member of the Bergen County Scholastic League Olympic Division. With 505 students in grades 10-12, the school was classified by the NJSIAA for the 2019–20 school year as Group II for most athletic competition purposes, which included schools with an enrollment of 486 to 758 students in that grade range.

The school participates as the host school / lead agency for joint cooperative girls soccer, boys / girls swimming and wrestling teams with Palisades Park High School, while Palisades Park is the host school for a co-op football team. These co-op programs operate under agreements scheduled to expire at the end of the 2023–24 school year.

The boys track team won the Group II spring / outdoor track state championship in 1961.

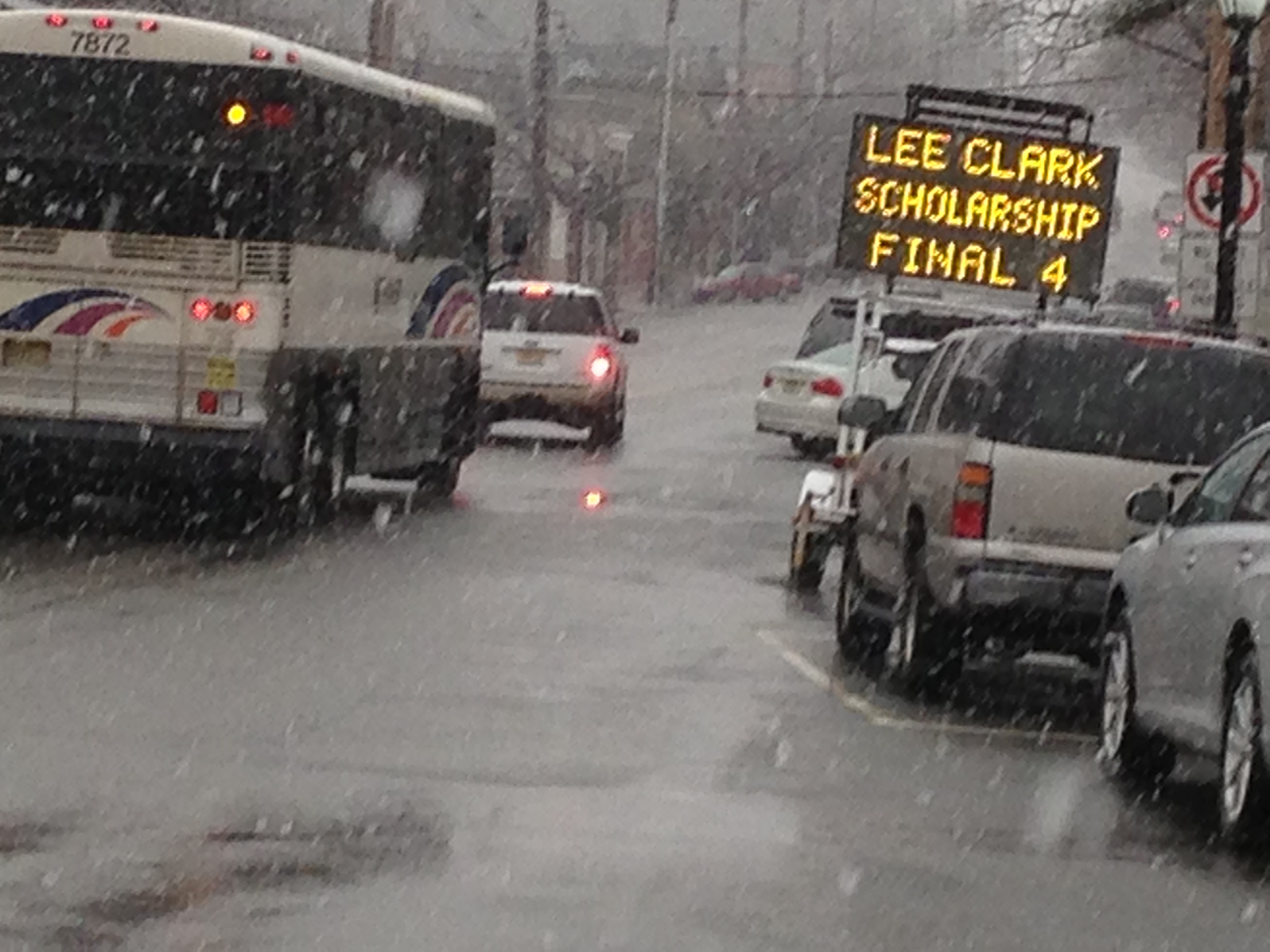
Sign along Broad Avenue for an annual scholarship dinner held in honor of former basketball coach Lee Clark.

The 1967 boys basketball team, led by longtime coach Lee Clark, used its height to its advantage and defeated Burlington Township High School by a score of 73-65 in the Group I tournament final to finish the season with a record of 20–4. The basketball court at the high school is named after Clark.

Joel Raucci was a two-time state champion in wrestling during 1970–71 and 1971–72. The only person from the school ever to have won the championship twice, in 2020 he was named one by Northjersey.com as one of the greatest wrestlers in Northern New Jersey history.

The girls tennis team won the Group I state championship in 2002 (defeating New Providence High School in the tournament final) and 2019 (vs. Glen Rock High School). The 2019 team used wins in all three singles matches to win the Group I finals against Glen Rock.

Leonia football, which is a co-op program with Palisades Park High School, became the first cooperative program to have reached a finals game in state history when the team made the North Jersey II Group III state championship game in 2012, falling to Summit High School by a 30–0 final score. The team finished 9–3 which was the most wins in Leonia school history, and Head Coach David Schuman was awarded NJIC coach of the year and The Record ranked the team 12th in North Jersey.

== Administration ==
The principal is Charles Kalender. His administration team includes the vice principal.

== Notable alumni ==
- Elizabeth Baranger (1927–2019, class of 1945), physicist and academic administrator
- Robert Burr (1922–2000), film, stage and television actor
- Robin Cook (born 1940, class of 1958), physician and novelist
- Barbara Corcoran (born 1949, class of 1967), businesswoman and television personality
- Fred Daibes (born 1956/57), real estate developer
- Maybelle Gilliland (1906–1971), track athlete
- Toomas Hendrik Ilves (born 1953, class of 1972), President of Estonia
- Bob Klapisch, sportswriter
- David Klass, screenwriter and novelist
- Josephine Kuuire, Ghanaian photographer, digital artist, graphic designer and activist
- Lim Kim (born 1994), South Korean musical artist
- David Mansfield (born 1956), rock musician
- Vera Maxwell (1901–1995), fashion designer
- Christiane Noll (born 1968), singer and actress
- Nick Prisco (1909–1981), football tailback who played one season in the NFL
- Will Ramos (born 1993/94), singer who is the lead vocalist of the deathcore band Lorna Shore
- Elizabeth Stine (1905–1993), athlete who set world records in the high jump and the triple jump
- Ivory Sully (born 1957), football cornerback who played nine seasons in the NFL
