= Daibes =

Daibes is a surname. Notable people with the surname include:

- Fred Daibes (born 1956/1957), American real estate developer
- Khouloud Daibes (born 1965), Palestinian architect and former politician and diplomat
