= Edgewater, New Jersey =

Borough in Bergen County, New Jersey, US

- Borough
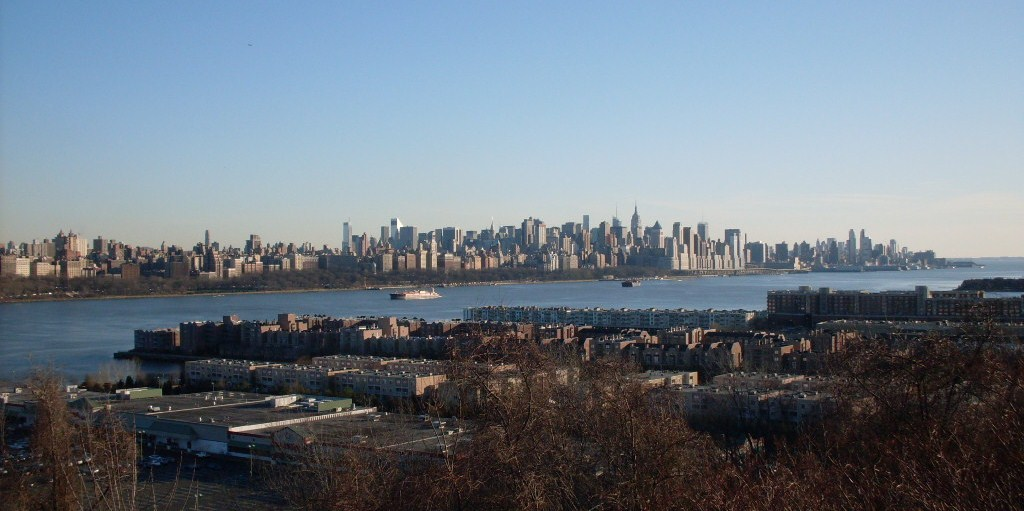
- Edgewater, New Jersey, in the foreground, overlooking Manhattan across the Hudson River in the background

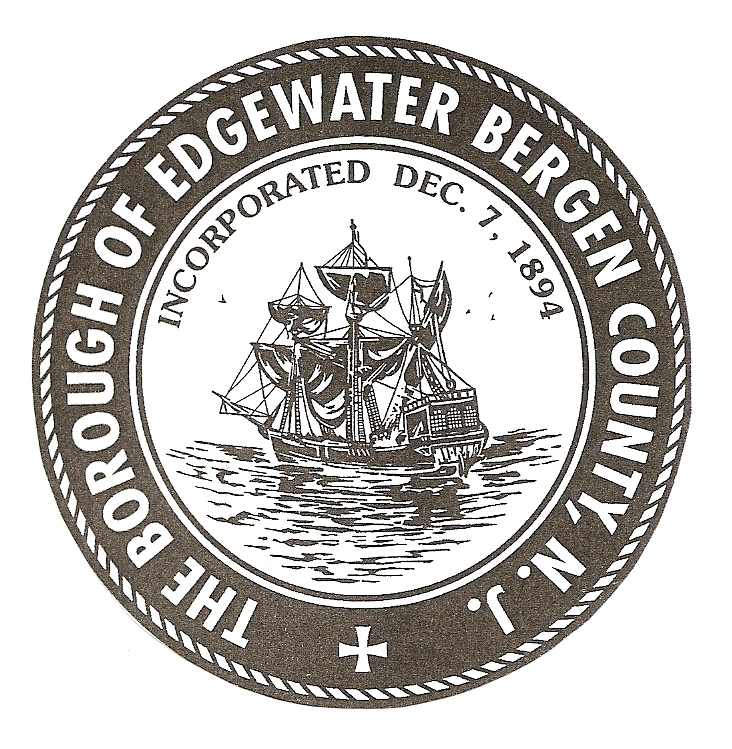
- Seal

- Location of Edgewater in Bergen County highlighted in red (left). Inset map: Location of Bergen County in New Jersey highlighted in orange (right).

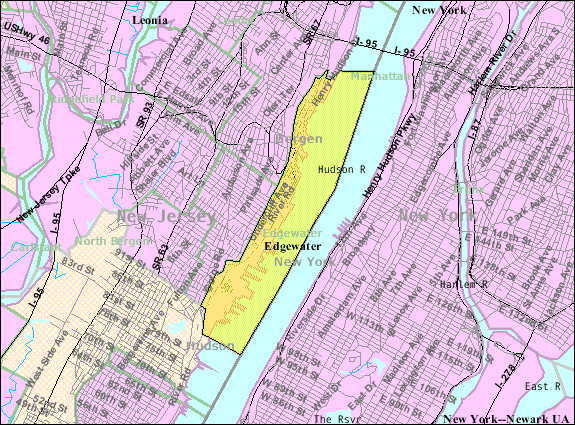
- Census Bureau map of Edgewater, New Jersey

- Location in Bergen County Location in New Jersey Location in the United States
- Coordinates: 40.82465°N 73.973793°W
- Country: United States
- State: New Jersey
- County: Bergen
- Incorporated: December 7, 1894, as Undercliff
- Renamed: November 8, 1899, as Edgewater

Government
  - Type: Borough
  - Body: Borough Council
  - Mayor: Michael McPartland (D, term ends December 31, 2027)
  - Administrator: Gregory S. Franz
  - Municipal clerk: Annamarie O'Connor

Area
  - Total: 2.43 sq mi (6.29 km^{2})
  - Land: 0.97 sq mi (2.52 km^{2})
  - Water: 1.46 sq mi (3.78 km^{2}) 60.33%
  - Rank: 376th of 565 in state 39th of 70 in county
- Elevation: 3 ft (0.91 m)

Population (2020)
  - Total: 14,336
  - Estimate (2023): 14,678
  - Rank: 184th of 565 in state 24th of 70 in county
  - Density: 14,764.2/sq mi (5,700.5/km^{2})
  - Rank: 19th of 565 in state 6th of 70 in county
- Time zone: UTC−05:00 (Eastern (EST))
  - Summer (DST): UTC−04:00 (Eastern (EDT))
- ZIP Code: 07020
- Area code: 201
- FIPS code: 3400320020
- GNIS feature ID: 0885203
- Website: edgewaternj.org

Edgewater is a borough located along the Hudson River in Bergen County, in the U.S. state of New Jersey. As of the 2020 United States census, the borough's population was 14,336, an increase of 2,823 (+24.5%) from the 2010 census count of 11,513, which in turn reflected an increase of 3,836 (+50.0%) from the 7,677 counted in the 2000 census

The borough's history has featured the founding of the first colony in Bergen County, contribution to the Revolutionary War, a period as a "sleepy, pastoral little town" with resort hotels in the 19th century, industrialization in the early 20th century, and a transition to a rapidly growing residential community in the late 20th century.

Edgewater was incorporated as a municipality on December 7, 1894, from portions of Ridgefield Township as the Borough of Undercliff, based on the results of a referendum that passed two days earlier. The borough was formed during the "Boroughitis" phenomenon then sweeping through Bergen County, in which 26 boroughs were formed in the county in 1894 alone. The borough's name was changed to Edgewater on November 8, 1899. The borough was named for its location on the Hudson River.

== History ==
Algonquian people, primarily Lenape, lived in the area prior to Dutch colonisation in the 17th century. David Pietersz Devries (also transliterated as David Pietersen de Vries), the first European settler, bought 500 acres (202 ha) of land from the Tappan tribe and established the settlement of Vriessendael in what is now Edgewater. A historical plaque placed in Veteran's Field by the Bergen County Historical Society names Vriessendael as the first known colony in Bergen County with a founding date of 1640. Parts of Vriessendael were destroyed in 1643 during Kieft's War in reprisal for the massacres of Lenape people taking refuge at Pavonia and Corlears Hook. In pioneer days, River Road was known as the Hackensack Turnpike, and Ox [sic] Hill Road was an important route to the top of the Palisades Cliff. While Oxen Hill Road still exists as a thoroughfare, another Colonial hallmark and major local industry has only recently disappeared: shad fishing. The Undercliff section in the northern section of Edgewater was originally a colony of fishermen. In the 1980s there were still about 100 commercial fishermen in New Jersey harvesting shad from their annual spring run from the Atlantic Ocean up the Hudson River to spawn. Now there are none.

Etienne Burdett began ferry service between north Edgewater and the island of Manhattan in 1758. His gambrel-roofed house in what is now the Edgewater Colony stood until 1899. The ferry service at Burdett's Landing, which was located at the southern base of the bluff of Fort Lee, proved valuable to the American cause during the Revolutionary War. The ferry functioned as the link for supplies, information and transportation between Fort Lee on the New Jersey side of the Hudson River and Fort Washington on the New York side. In the century following the Revolutionary war, north Edgewater developed into a resort area with large hotels built in the mid- and late 19th century. It was in the 19th century that Burdett's Landing became known as "Old Stone Dock", as cobblestones quarried from the Palisades Cliffs by Russell & Read were shipped across the Hudson to fill the demand for paving Manhattan streets. Concern over the destruction caused by quarrying operations led to the formation of the Palisades Interstate Park in 1900, which was effective in preserving the cliffs. Although the first chemical plant was founded in 1843 in the south section of the borough, throughout the 19th century the town retained a bucolic character. Early in the 20th century the addition of landfill to the Hudson River changed the borough's appearance. Until that time, the Hudson River lay closer to River Road from just above Veteran's field southward to what is now the Binghamton Ferry Plaza.

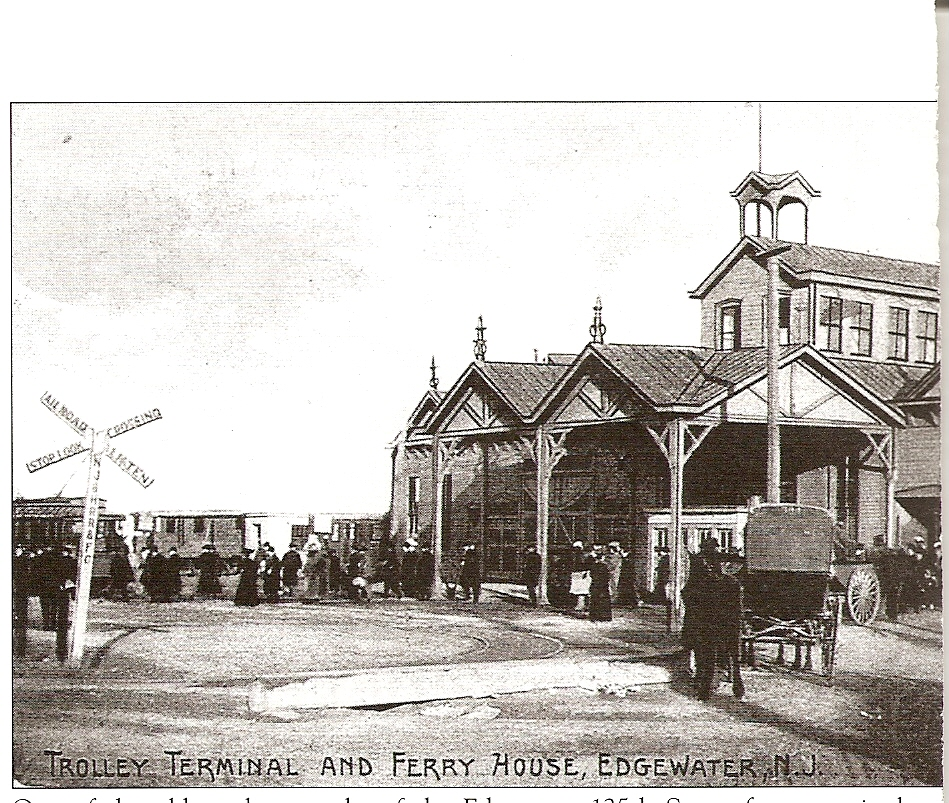
Trolley terminal and ferry house, early 20th century

The 20th century brought great change to Edgewater with industrialization, which overwhelmed the borough and filled 3 miles (4.8 km) of the shoreline with its operations. Transportation of factory goods was facilitated when the New York, Susquehanna and Western Railway cut the Edgewater Tunnel through the Palisades in 1894 to connect the borough to its main line. Edgewater was also well situated for shipping, with deep water piers on the Hudson River and access to abundant labor from Manhattan. Generally, industrial development occurred in the southern end of the borough, while the northern end remained residential. As industrialization increased in the borough, picnic grounds lost their appeal and resort hotels faded. By 1918, there were 8,044 workers employed by Edgewater's manufacturing facilities, producing primarily chemicals, dyes, and confectionery products such as oils and sugars. Prominent industries of Edgewater included a Ford assembly plant, Alcoa, Valvoline, and the American Can Company. Railroad trains served various factories, traversing tracks laid in River Road. During the first 30 years of the century, Edgewater's population quadrupled, and the transient workforce increased tenfold. Eventually the factories closed. The reasons were varied, but they included the globalization of industry, obsolete facilities and the replacement of railroad shipping by trucking, which could not run its large tractor trailer trucks on Edgewater's narrow streets.

Joseph Mitchell's essay The Rivermen, which was published in The New Yorker and is included in his book The Bottom of the Harbor, provides an evocative portrait of life in Edgewater in the early 20th century.

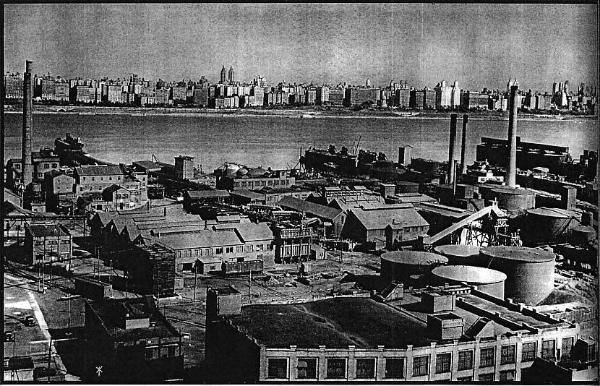
1930 Fortune magazine photo of industrial and chemical operations in south Edgewater. Today this land is a Superfund site.

The late 20th century history of Edgewater was one of change from an industrialized town to a residential one. With the closing of the factories, development initially came to Edgewater in the 1960s and grew exponentially in the early 1980s, as developers began projects to convert the industrial sites that had historically led to Edgewater not being considered as an option for development. As condominiums were built along the Hudson where industry had formerly operated, the population of Edgewater grew rapidly. The population had been mostly in the 4,000 to 5,000 range from 1930 to 1990, then increased by 50% to 7,677 in 2000 and again by 50% to 11,513 in the 2010 Census. Borough council members and residents acknowledge that population growth has exacerbated the problem of increased traffic. With the transition from industrial to residential, crime statistics were down, with the police chief describing how bar fights between factory workers were commonplace in the early 1970s, while real estate values are up. Because of the expense of buying property, some currently refer to Edgewater as part of the Gold Coast. A photographic history of Edgewater describes the population and demographics change and its possible consequence this way:

Now a good number of residents live on the river in condominiums and rental apartments and town houses on land that was once the province of heavy industry. Some see this as the creation of a town divided, with the newcomers living on the east side of River Road by the Hudson River and the old-timers living on the west side of River Road.

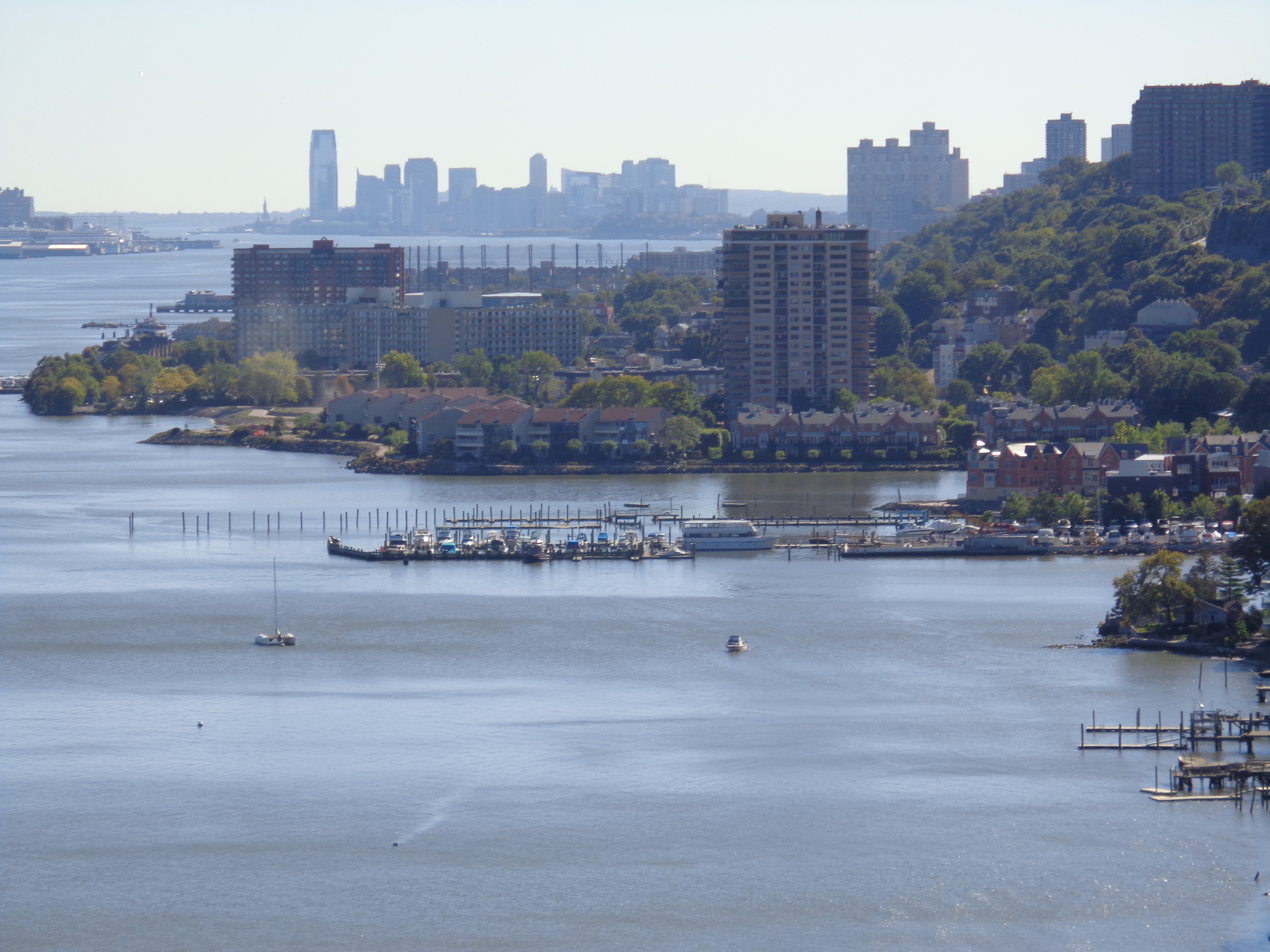
A southward view of Edgewater (foreground) from the George Washington Bridge, with the skyline of Jersey City in the background

Although the borough is unrecognizable as the industrial town it once was, growing pains have left marks. When the old Alcoa plant site from 1916 began to be converted to condominiums, construction was forced to halt for cleanup of industrial contaminants, including excessively high concentrations of PCBs. In another case, construction of a condominium/shopping center in south Edgewater was interrupted for six months by safety measures to protect workers from chemical exposure in the lead- and arsenic-riddled soil. Next to this structure, behind a chain link fence lies a Superfund site. Operational Hess Oil tanks, beside the derelict Alcoa rolling mill, once the second-largest in the world, are a reminder of the borough's industrial phase. The building, occupying 1,100,000 square feet (100,000 m2) of space, was designed in 1914 and was used to roll ingots of aluminum into sheets that were used to create everything from toothpaste tubes to aircraft frames, before the facility was abandoned in 1967 due to lack of space needed to expand the facility.

== Geography ==
According to the United States Census Bureau, the borough had a total area of 2.46 square miles (6.36 km^{2}), including 0.97 square miles (2.52 km^{2}) of land and 1.48 square miles (3.84 km^{2}) of water (60.33%).

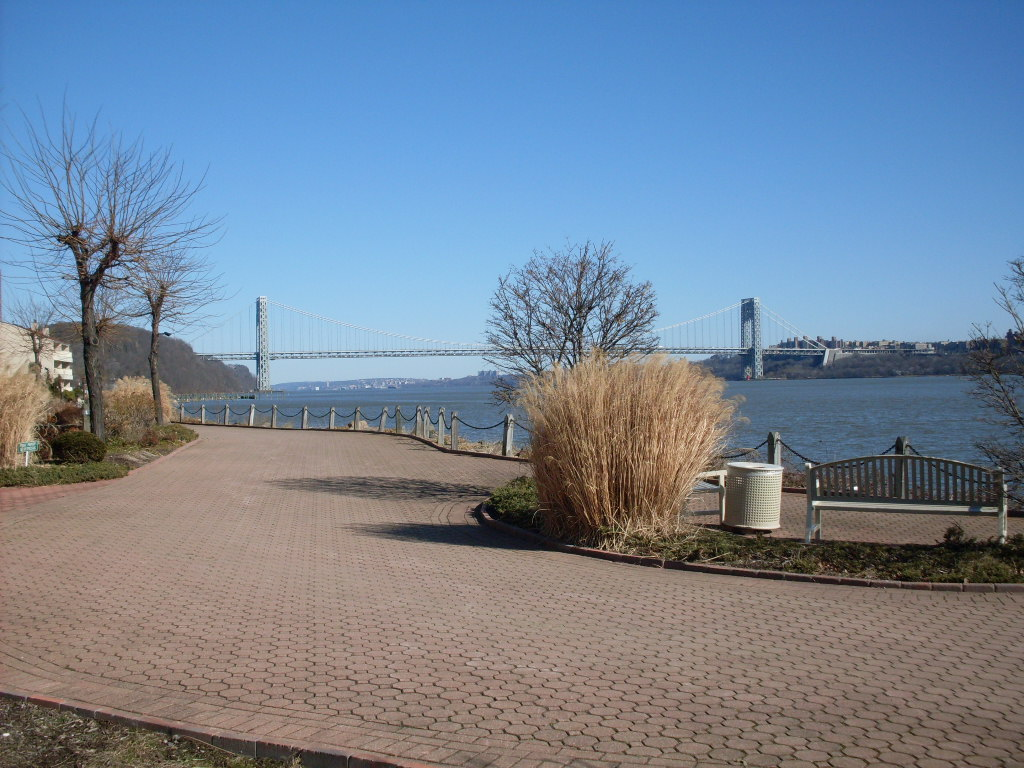
The Hudson River Waterfront Walkway in north Edgewater with a view of the Hudson River and George Washington Bridge in the background

The borough is a narrow strip of land along the Hudson River, with 3.5 miles (5.6 km) of waterfront. The Palisades Cliff rises dramatically and forms a natural border on its western side, running roughly parallel to the Hudson, with Fort Lee and Cliffside Park atop the cliff, north and south, respectively. Edgewater abuts Fort Lee Historic Park in the borough of Fort Lee on the north.

River Road, which overlooks the Hudson River and the Manhattan skyline, runs into and out of the town from the north and south, lying just above the level of the Hudson. Three roads lead up the Palisades Cliff: Route 5, with one switchback, ascends to Palisades Avenue, which leads north into Fort Lee and south into Cliffside Park. Gorge Road and Edgewater Road, the latter still referred to by many local residents by its Colonial-era name as Oxen Hill Road, lead up the Palisades to Cliffside Park.

The borough borders Cliffside Park and Fort Lee in Bergen County; North Bergen in Hudson County; and the New York City borough of Manhattan across the Hudson River.

== Demographics ==
Historical population
Census	Pop.	Note	%±
1900	1,006		—
1910	2,655		163.9%
1920	3,530		33.0%
1930	4,089		15.8%
1940	4,028		−1.5%
1950	3,952		−1.9%
1960	4,113		4.1%
1970	4,987		21.2%
1980	4,628		−7.2%
1990	5,001		8.1%
2000	7,677		53.5%
2010	11,513		50.0%
2020	14,336		24.5%
2023 (est.)	14,678	▲	2.4%
Population sources: 1900–1920 1900–1910; 1910–1930 1900–2020; 2000 2010 2020

As of March 2011 about 2,500 Japanese-Americans lived in Edgewater and Fort Lee; this is the largest concentration of Japanese-Americans in New Jersey. In the 2013–2017 American Community Survey, 35.7% of residents were identified as Asian, including 2,205 (18.1%) who were Korean, 630 (5.2%) were Asian Indian and 574 (4.7%) were Japanese.

=== Racial and ethnic composition ===
Edgewater borough, Bergen County, New Jersey – Racial and ethnic composition Note: the US Census treats Hispanic/Latino as an ethnic category. This table excludes Latinos from the racial categories and assigns them to a separate category. Hispanics/Latinos may be of any race.
Race / Ethnicity (NH = Non-Hispanic)	Pop 2000	Pop 2010	Pop 2020	% 2000	% 2010	% 2020
White alone (NH)	4,661	5,343	5,934	60.71%	46.41%	41.39%
Black or African American alone (NH)	243	519	772	3.17%	4.51%	5.39%
Native American or Alaska Native alone (NH)	8	8	13	0.10%	0.07%	0.09%
Asian alone (NH)	1,765	4,076	5,071	22.99%	35.40%	35.37%
Native Hawaiian or Pacific Islander alone (NH)	2	6	1	0.03%	0.05%	0.01%
Other race alone (NH)	27	43	87	0.35%	0.37%	0.61%
Mixed race or Multiracial (NH)	169	240	499	2.20%	2.08%	3.48%
Hispanic or Latino (any race)	802	1,278	1,959	10.45%	11.10%	13.66%
Total	7,677	11,513	14,336	100.00%	100.00%	100.00%

=== 2020 census ===
As of the 2020 census, Edgewater had a population of 14,336. The median age was 39.6 years. 19.0% of residents were under the age of 18 and 13.4% were 65 years of age or older. For every 100 females, there were 89.9 males, and for every 100 females age 18 and over there were 87.1 males age 18 and over.

100.0% of residents lived in urban areas, while 0.0% lived in rural areas.

There were 6,742 households, of which 27.0% had children under the age of 18 living in them. Of all households, 43.9% were married-couple households, 20.0% were households with a male householder and no spouse or partner present, and 30.4% were households with a female householder and no spouse or partner present. About 35.1% of all households were made up of individuals, and 9.8% had someone living alone who was 65 years of age or older.

There were 7,315 housing units, of which 7.8% were vacant. The homeowner vacancy rate was 3.2% and the rental vacancy rate was 6.7%.

=== 2010 census ===
The 2010 United States census counted 11,513 people, 5,637 households, and 3,021 families in the borough. The population density was 12,312.0 per square mile (4,753.7/km^{2}). There were 6,282 housing units at an average density of 6,718.0 per square mile (2,593.8/km^{2}). The racial makeup was 53.29% (6,135) White, 4.95% (570) Black or African American, 0.14% (16) Native American, 35.47% (4,084) Asian, 0.06% (7) Pacific Islander, 3.35% (386) from other races, and 2.74% (315) from two or more races. Hispanic or Latino of any race were 11.10% (1,278) of the population. Korean Americans accounted for 19.6% of the population.

Of the 5,637 households, 23.6% had children under the age of 18; 43.2% were married couples living together; 7.8% had a female householder with no husband present and 46.4% were non-families. Of all households, 39.3% were made up of individuals and 10.1% had someone living alone who was 65 years of age or older. The average household size was 2.04 and the average family size was 2.76. Same-sex couples headed 38 households in 2010, an increase from the 32 counted in 2000.

17.7% of the population were under the age of 18, 4.1% from 18 to 24, 43.6% from 25 to 44, 23.0% from 45 to 64, and 11.6% who were 65 years of age or older. The median age was 37.2 years. For every 100 females, the population had 90.2 males. For every 100 females ages 18 and older there were 87.0 males.

The Census Bureau's 2006–2010 American Community Survey showed that (in 2010 inflation-adjusted dollars) median household income was $83,602 (with a margin of error of +/− $8,791) and the median family income was $114,375 (+/− $19,887). Males had a median income of $82,248 (+/− $13,946) versus $57,971 (+/− $9,987) for females. The per capita income for the borough was $58,220 (+/− $5,463). About 7.7% of families and 8.5% of the population were below the poverty line, including 15.0% of those under age 18 and 7.8% of those age 65 or over.

=== 2000 census ===
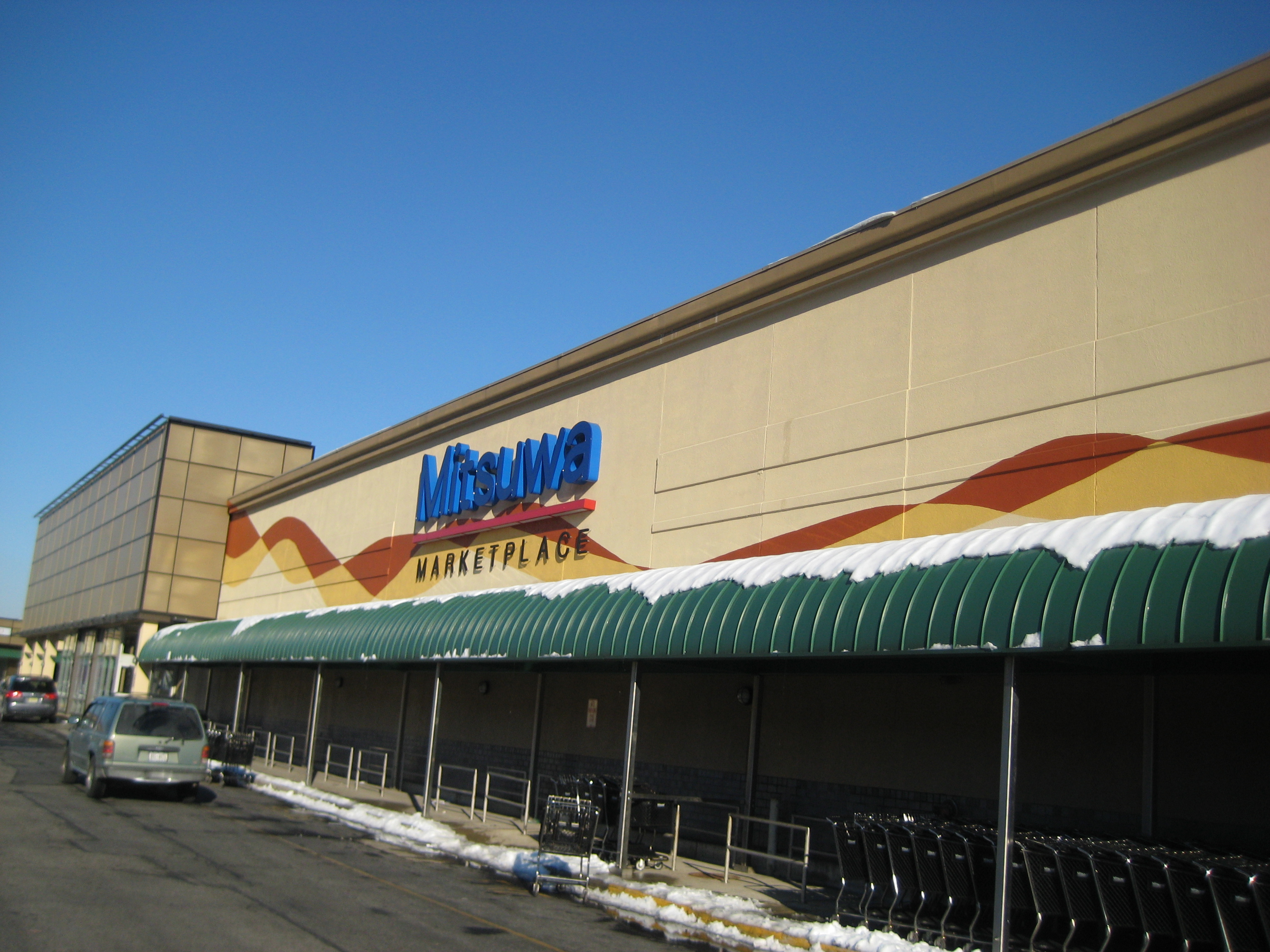
Japanese grocery chain Mitsuwa store in Edgewater

As of the 2000 United States census, there were 7,677 people, 3,836 households, and 1,971 families residing in the borough. The population density was 9,060.6 inhabitants per square mile (3,498.3/km^{2}). There were 4,277 housing units at an average density of 5,047.8 per square mile (1,949.0/km^{2}). As of the 2000 census, the racial makeup of the borough was 67.12% White, 10.45% Hispanic or Latino of any race, 3.52% African American, 0.21% Native American, 23.12% Asian, 0.04% Pacific Islander, 2.94% from other races, and 3.05% from two or more races.

There were 3,836 households, out of which 20.0% had children under the age of 18 living with them, 40.0% were married couples living together, 8.4% had a female householder with no husband present, and 48.6% were non-families. 39.1% of all households were made up of individuals, and 6.3% had someone living alone who was 65 years of age or older. The average household size was 2.00 and the average family size was 2.70.

In the borough the age distribution of the population shows 15.4% under the age of 18, 5.3% from 18 to 24, 46.7% from 25 to 44, 23.6% from 45 to 64, and 8.9% who were 65 years of age or older. The median age was 36 years. For every 100 females, there were 94.9 males. For every 100 females age 18 and over, there were 92.9 males.

The median income for a household in the borough was $63,455, and the median income for a family was $72,692. Males had a median income of $50,795 versus $49,238 for females. The per capita income for the borough was $42,650. About 6.2% of families and 8.6% of the population were below the poverty line, including 16.5% of those under age 18 and 13.6% of those age 65 or over.

In the 2000 Census, 11.83% of Edgewater's residents identified themselves as being of Korean ancestry, which was the ninth highest in the United States and seventh highest of any municipality in New Jersey, for all places with 1,000 or more residents identifying their ancestry. 3.22% of residents identified themselves as being of Japanese ancestry, which was the third highest of any municipality in New Jersey, behind Fort Lee (6.09%) and Demarest (3.72%). In the 2010 Census, those reporting Korean ancestry had increased to 19.6% of the population (2,258 residents), while the percentage of Japanese residents had risen to 4.9% (560 residents).

== Economy ==
Edgewater was the location of the Lever Brothers research center where chemist Vincent Lamberti, a holder of over 118 patents, spent most of his 40 years for the company, and where he invented Dove soap, the first soap not made with animal fat.

Edgewater has five main shopping areas. From north to south they are Town Centre, the Binghamton Shopping Plaza, Mitsuwa Marketplace, Edgewater Commons and City Place. All are located on the river side of River Road and bordered by the River Walk. As recently as 1984 the town had no supermarket. With development in subsequent years, by 2017, groceries could be purchased at Whole Foods Market in Town Centre, Trader Joe's at the Binghamton Plaza, Japanese-labeled groceries at Mitsuwa Marketplace and at Acme Markets in Edgewater Commons. Company-operated shuttle buses that ran on Wednesdays and Thursdays, bringing shoppers to Mitsuwa from Manhattan, were terminated in 2014.

== Arts and culture ==
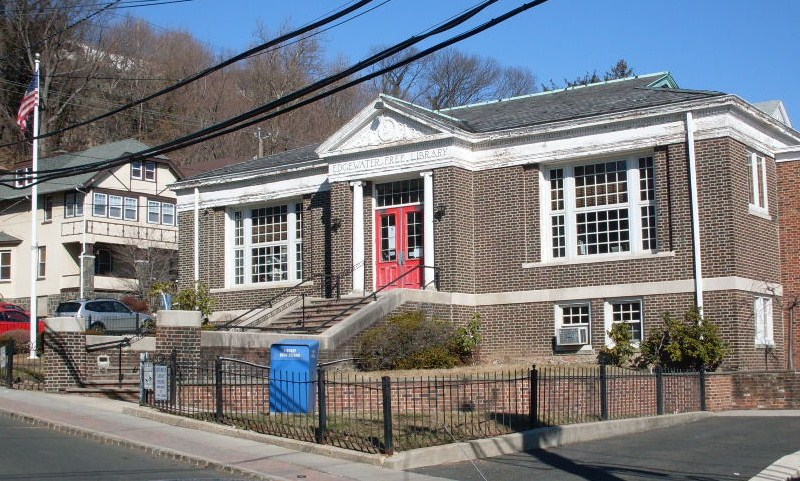
Edgewater Free Library

Borough Hall, the Binghamton Ferry and the Edgewater Public Library are listed on both the National Register of Historic Places and the New Jersey Register of Historic Places. Constructed in 1904, Borough Hall was granted $406,000 by Senate and General Assembly of New Jersey in August 2009 for restoration of the building. Among other renovations, the missing gargoyles were returned to the 1902 edifice.

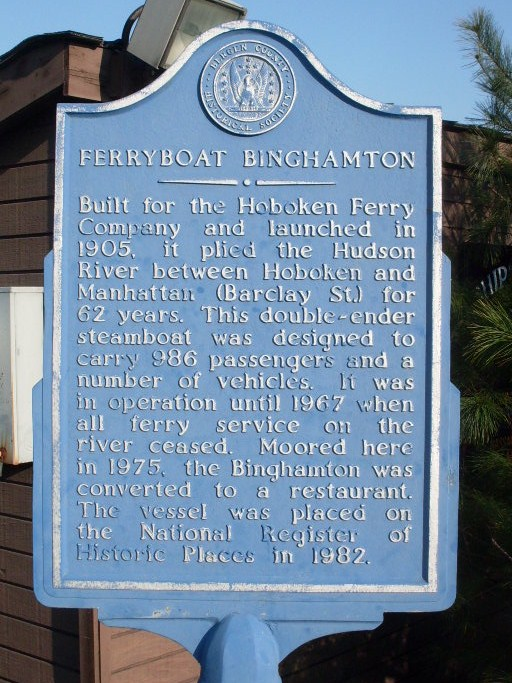
Plaque at site of Binghamton Ferry

The Binghamton ferryboat, formerly anchored near the Edgewater Marketplace, was built in 1904–1905 by Newport News Shipbuilding and Dry Dock Company, Newport News, Virginia. The only double-ended steam-powered ferry boat still on the Hudson River, the Binghamton ferried passengers from New Jersey to Barclay Street in Manhattan for many years, retiring in 1967 before being converted into a restaurant in 1975. The restaurant closed in 2007, and after a decade of accumulating damage from fire and flooding: particularly from Hurricane Sandy in 2012, the ferryboat was dismantled in 2017.

One of the remaining Carnegie libraries in New Jersey, built with $15,000 in funds from the Carnegie Foundation, the Edgewater Free Library was dedicated on February 8, 1916. Edgewater opened its library in 1910, prior to the donation from the Carnegie Foundation, with 817 books on its shelves.

In addition to these sites, the Eleanor Van Gelder School is listed on the New Jersey Register of Historic Places.

=== The River Walk ===
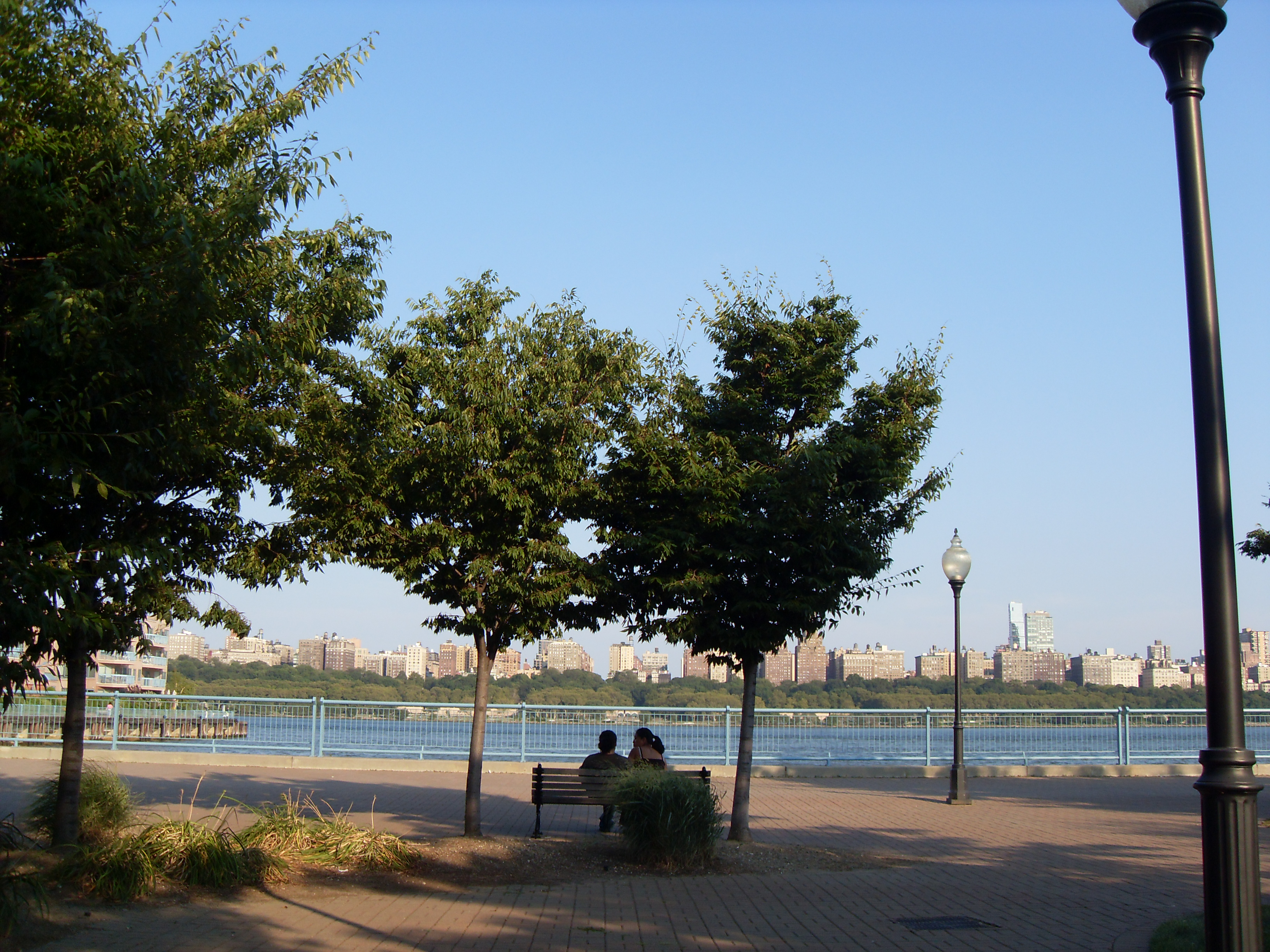
River Walk near Edgewater Commons shopping center

The promenade along the Hudson is part of the Hudson River Waterfront Walkway. In 1988, construction of a waterfront walkway was mandated by state law that would allow walkers a path along the Hudson River from Bayonne up to the George Washington Bridge. Although property owners were required to build and maintain it, many gaps remain. Of the 18.5 miles (29.8 km) called for, only 11 miles (18 km) are complete, and many of the gaps occur in Edgewater. The completed stretches offer paths for walking along the Hudson River with views of Manhattan.

=== Edgewater parrots ===
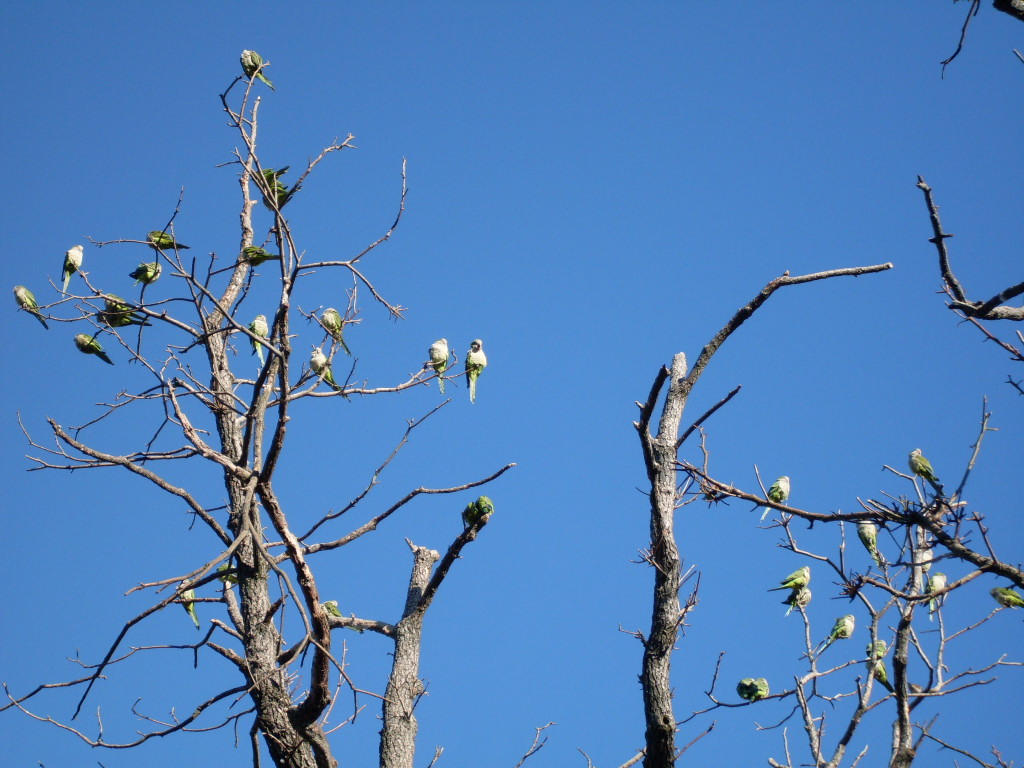
Monk parakeets near Memorial Park

Edgewater is the home of a free-flying colony of monk parakeets, also known as Quaker parrots, which are native to South America. These small, green parrots have lived in Edgewater since at least 1980 and were numbered at 200 to 230 in a 2008 article in The New York Times and about 200 in 2019. They are easily seen in Memorial Park and its vicinity at River Road and Route 5. The parrots build large nests of twigs and down which become permanent residences. Nests four-feet long can be seen near the intersection. How the birds came to Edgewater is unknown, though a widely accepted story traces their origin to an escape from a damaged crate at John F. Kennedy Airport in the 1960s, or alternatively they had been pets that escaped from their owners.

The birds have built nests against transformers on utility poles. Citing the risk of fire, the utility PSE&G has destroyed such nests. This has brought the utility into conflict with parrot advocates. In 2008, PSE&G agreed not to take down nests during breeding season.

== Parks and recreation ==
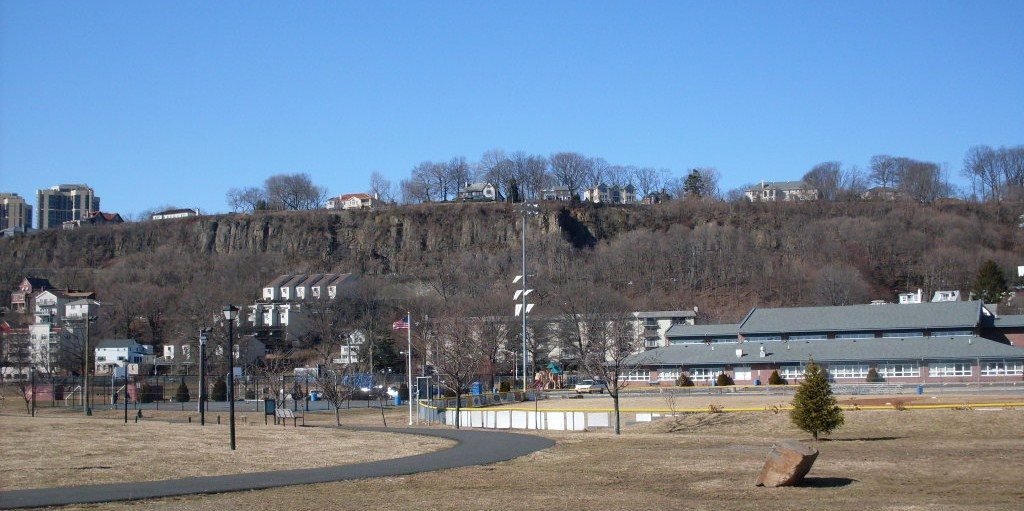
Community Center with Little League field and track in foreground. Palisades Cliff in background.

22-acre (89,000 m^{2}) Veterans' Field offers residents recreational opportunities and provides space for a Community Center and American Legion Post 116. Veterans' Field is located on River Road (County Route 505) in the north section of Edgewater, lying along the Hudson River. It has indoor and outdoor basketball courts, three softball fields, a 1/3 mile-long track which accommodates runners, walkers and skaters; tennis courts, a Little League field and a playground. It is also the site of a large American flag which can easily be seen from across the river in Manhattan. A plaque commemorating the New Netherland plantation of David Pietersen de Vries, Vriessendael, is located at the entrance to the field on the west. Although the field extends well to the east, it did not exist in de Vries's day. In 1922, landfill was dumped into the Hudson River from the construction site of Yankee Stadium in the Bronx, which gives Veteran's Field its current dimensions. In September 2011, Veteran's Field was closed due to soil contamination in the fill brought to the site.

== Government ==
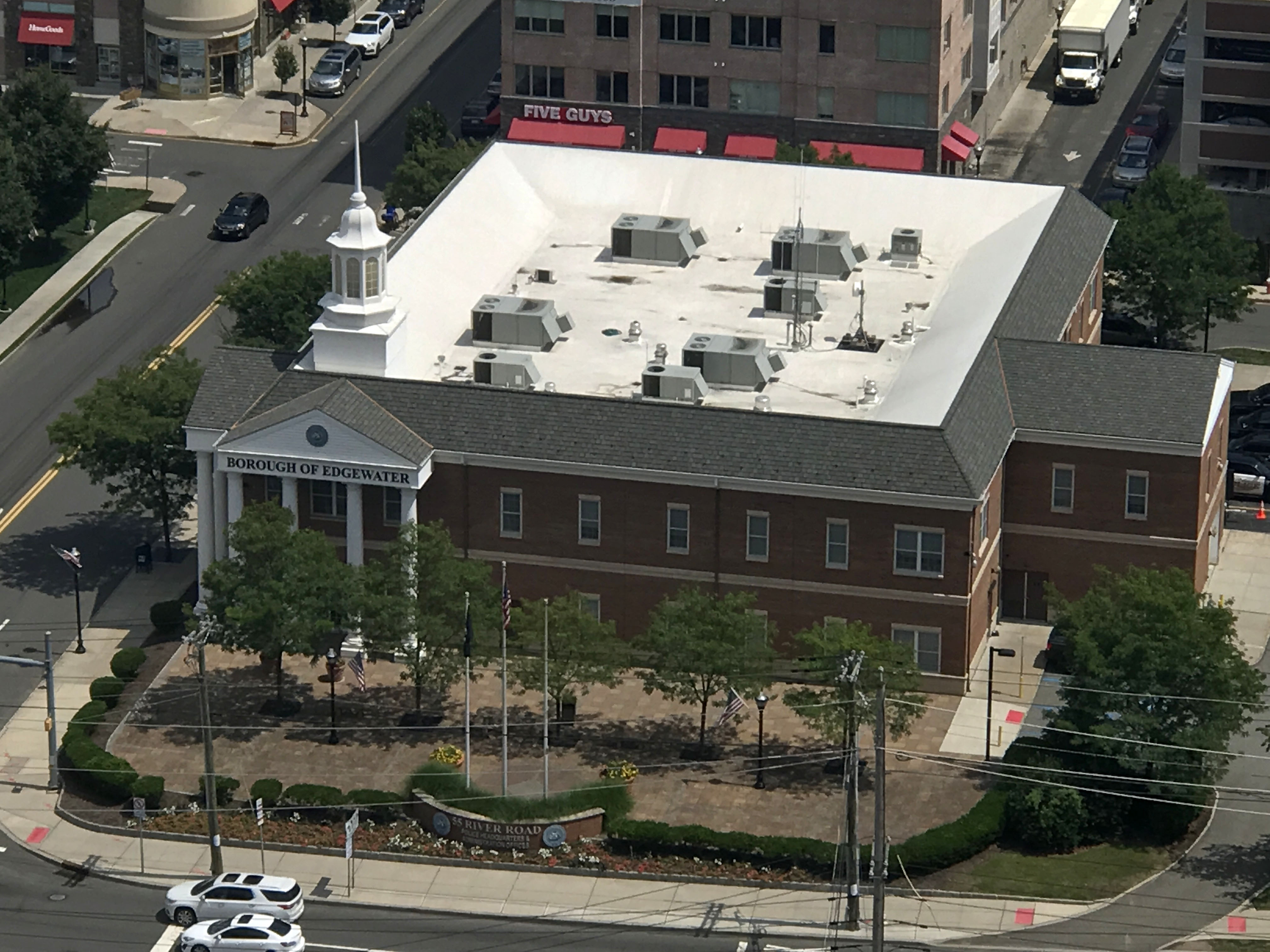
Edgewater Borough Hall on River Road

=== Local government ===
Edgewater is governed under the borough form of New Jersey municipal government, which is used in 218 municipalities (of the 564) statewide, making it the most common form of government in New Jersey. The governing body is comprised of a mayor and a borough council, with all positions elected at-large on a partisan basis as part of the November general election. A mayor is elected directly by the voters to a four-year term of office. The borough council includes six members elected to serve three-year terms on a staggered basis, with two seats coming up for election each year in a three-year cycle. The borough form of government used by Edgewater is a "weak mayor / strong council" government in which council members act as the legislative body with the mayor presiding at meetings and voting only in the event of a tie. The mayor can veto ordinances subject to an override by a two-thirds majority vote of the council. The mayor makes committee and liaison assignments for council members, and most appointments are made by the mayor with the advice and consent of the council.

As of 2023, the mayor of Edgewater is Democrat Michael McPartland, whose term of office ends December 31, 2027. Members of the Edgewater Borough Council are Anthony Bartolomeo (D, 2024), Rinaldy "Ray" Gutierrez (D, 2026), Dolores Lawlor (D, 2024), Donald A. Martin (D, 2025), Vincent J. Monte (D, 2025) and Jose Luis Vidal (D, 2026).

In January 2015, Dolores Lawlor was selected from the borough council from a list of three candidates nominated by the Democratic municipal committee to fill the vacant seat expiring in December 2015 of Kevin Doran, who resigned from office earlier that month after announcing that he was moving out of the borough.

Democrat Agnes "Nancy" Merse, whose term as mayor was to expire on December 31, 2011, died due to complications from cancer on March 10, 2011. Councilmember James Delaney was chosen in April 2011 to fill Merse's vacancy as mayor. Michael H. Henwood was chosen to fill Delaney's vacant council seat, and served the remainder of that term until December 2011 before he was elected to serve a full term in office.

The Edgewater administrative offices and police department moved from 916 River Road to the new Borough Hall, 55 River Road, in 2011, with a dedication ceremony on October 16. The new building includes 25,000 square feet (2,300 m^{2}) of space, offering relief from cramped conditions with 150% more floor space, and expanded parking facilities.

=== Federal, state and county representation ===
Edgewater is located in the 9th Congressional District and is part of New Jersey's 36th state legislative district.

For the 119th United States Congress, New Jersey's 9th congressional district is represented by Nellie Pou (D, North Haledon) New Jersey is represented in the United States Senate by Democrats Cory Booker (Newark, term ends 2027) and Andy Kim (Moorestown, term ends 2031).

For the 2026–2027 session, the 36th legislative district of the New Jersey Legislature is represented in the State Senate by Paul Sarlo (D, Wood-Ridge) and in the General Assembly by Clinton Calabrese (D, Cliffside Park) and Gary Schaer (D, Passaic).

Bergen County is governed by a directly elected County Executive, with legislative functions performed by a Board of County Commissioners comprised of seven members who are elected at-large to three-year terms in partisan elections on a staggered basis, with either two or three seats coming up for election each November; a Chairman and Vice Chairman are selected from among its seven members at a reorganization meeting held every January. As of 2025, the county executive is James J. Tedesco III (D, Paramus), whose four-year term of office ends December 31, 2026.

Bergen County's Commissioners are Chair Mary J. Amoroso (D, Mahwah, 2025), Vice Chair Steven A. Tanelli (D, North Arlington, 2027), Chair Pro Tem Joan Voss (D, Fort Lee, 2026), Rafael Marte (D, Bergenfield, 2026), Germaine M. Ortiz (D, Emerson, 2025), Thomas J. Sullivan Jr. (D, Montvale, 2025) and Tracy Silna Zur (D, Franklin Lakes, 2027).

Bergen County's elected constitutional officials are Clerk John S. Hogan (D, Northvale, 2026), Sheriff Anthony Cureton (D, Englewood, 2027) and Surrogate Michael R. Dressler (D, Cresskill, 2026).

=== Politics ===
United States presidential election results for Edgewater 2024 2020 2016 2012 2008 2004
Year	Republican		Democratic		Third party(ies)	
Year	No.	%	No.	%	No.	%
2024	1,711	34.81%	3,079	62.64%	125	2.54%
2020	1,582	29.13%	3,787	69.74%	61	1.12%
2016	1,134	27.06%	2,932	69.96%	125	2.98%
2012	1,031	29.81%	2,392	69.15%	36	1.04%
2008	1,224	31.06%	2,694	68.36%	23	0.58%
2004	1,237	33.71%	2,405	65.53%	28	0.76%

As of March 2011, there were a total of 5,120 registered voters in Edgewater, of which 2,250 (43.9% vs. 31.7% countywide) were registered as Democrats, 514 (10.0% vs. 21.1%) were registered as Republicans and 2,352 (45.9% vs. 47.1%) were registered as Unaffiliated. There were 4 voters registered as Libertarians or Greens. Among the borough's 2010 Census population, 44.5% (vs. 57.1% in Bergen County) were registered to vote, including 54.1% of those ages 18 and over (vs. 73.7% countywide).

In the 2012 presidential election, Democrat Barack Obama received 2,392 votes (68.1% vs. 54.8% countywide), ahead of Republican Mitt Romney with 1,031 votes (29.4% vs. 43.5%) and other candidates with 36 votes (1.0% vs. 0.9%), among the 3,511 ballots cast by the borough's 5,877 registered voters, for a turnout of 59.7% (vs. 70.4% in Bergen County). In the 2008 presidential election, Democrat Barack Obama received 2,694 votes (67.5% vs. 53.9% countywide), ahead of Republican John McCain with 1,224 votes (30.7% vs. 44.5%) and other candidates with 23 votes (0.6% vs. 0.8%), among the 3,989 ballots cast by the borough's 5,714 registered voters, for a turnout of 69.8% (vs. 76.8% in Bergen County). In the 2004 presidential election, Democrat John Kerry received 2,405 votes (65.1% vs. 51.7% countywide), ahead of Republican George W. Bush with 1,237 votes (33.5% vs. 47.2%) and other candidates with 28 votes (0.8% vs. 0.7%), among the 3,696 ballots cast by the borough's 5,135 registered voters, for a turnout of 72.0% (vs. 76.9% in the whole county).

Gubernatorial election results for Edgewater
Year	Republican		Democratic		Third party(ies)	
Year	No.	%	No.	%	No.	%
2025	1,009	30.72%	2,252	68.55%	24	0.73%
2021	811	33.58%	1,586	65.67%	18	0.75%
2017	412	24.79%	1,222	73.53%	28	1.68%
2013	704	49.93%	687	48.72%	19	1.35%
2009	692	33.46%	1,282	61.99%	94	4.55%
2005	577	26.64%	1,543	71.24%	46	2.12%

In the 2013 gubernatorial election, Republican Chris Christie received 49.9% of the vote (704 cast), ahead of Democrat Barbara Buono with 48.7% (687 votes), and other candidates with 1.3% (19 votes), among the 1,446 ballots cast by the borough's 5,148 registered voters (36 ballots were spoiled), for a turnout of 28.1%. In the 2009 gubernatorial election, Democrat Jon Corzine received 1,282 ballots cast (61.3% vs. 48.0% countywide), ahead of Republican Chris Christie with 692 votes (33.1% vs. 45.8%), Independent Chris Daggett with 82 votes (3.9% vs. 4.7%) and other candidates with 12 votes (0.6% vs. 0.5%), among the 2,092 ballots cast by the borough's 5,482 registered voters, yielding a 38.2% turnout (vs. 50.0% in the county).

United States Senate election results for Edgewater1
Year	Republican		Democratic		Third party(ies)	
Year	No.	%	No.	%	No.	%
2024	1,426	31.09%	3,034	66.14%	127	2.77%
2018	871	28.83%	2,068	68.45%	82	2.71%
2012	850	26.92%	2,248	71.18%	60	1.90%
2006	677	28.04%	1,677	69.47%	60	2.49%

United States Senate election results for Edgewater2
Year	Republican		Democratic		Third party(ies)	
Year	No.	%	No.	%	No.	%
2020	1,493	28.35%	3,697	70.21%	76	1.44%
2014	480	26.33%	1,278	70.10%	65	3.57%
2013	245	24.85%	731	74.14%	10	1.01%
2008	1,040	29.48%	2,434	68.99%	54	1.53%

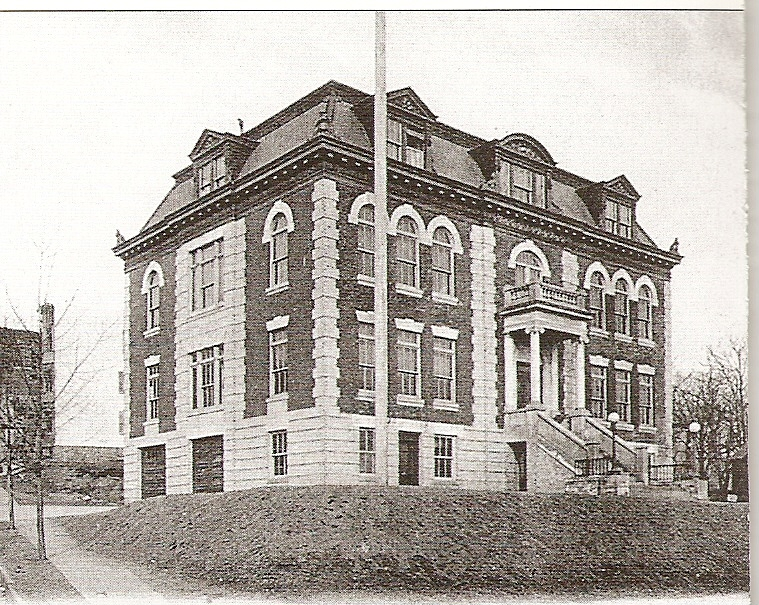
Borough Hall in early 20th-century postcard

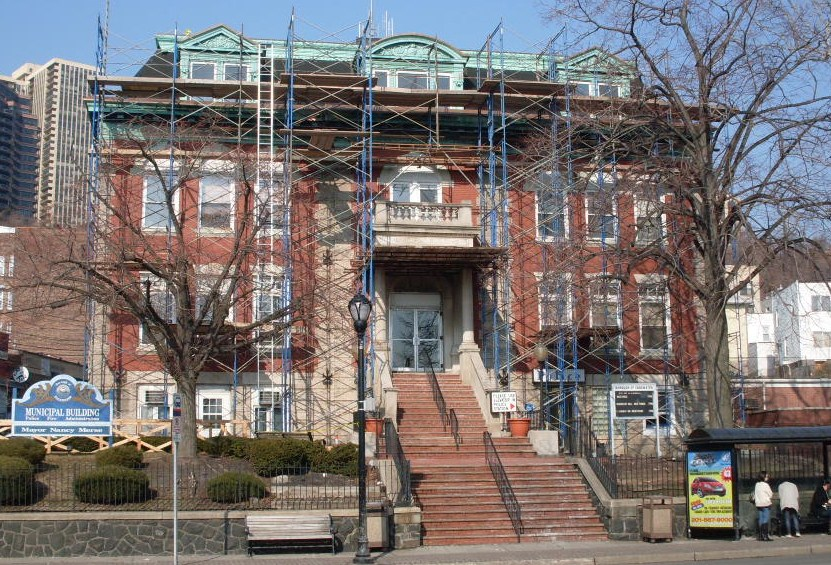
Renovating "old" Borough Hall in 2009

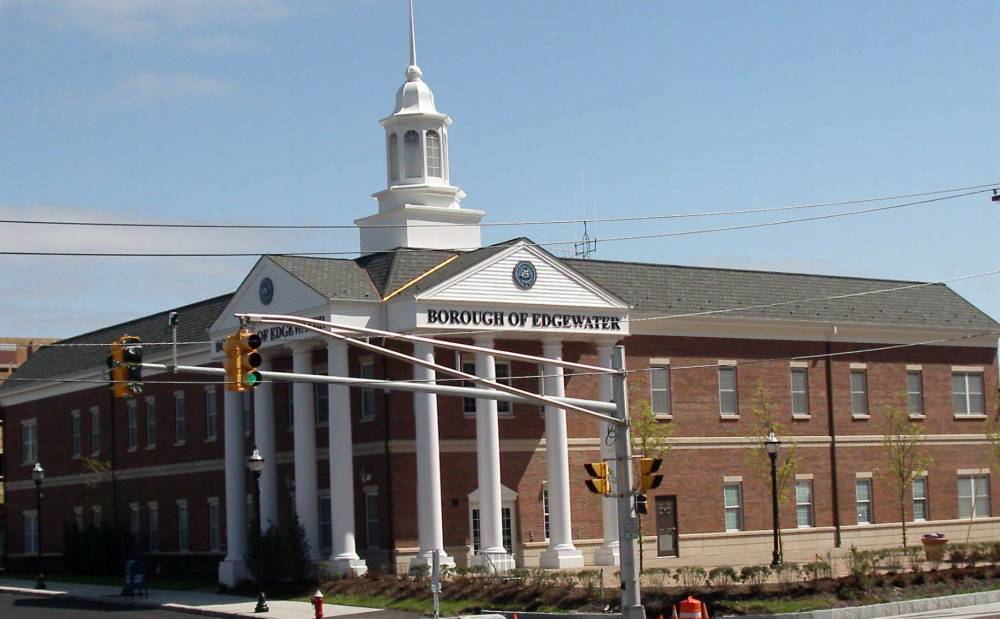
New Borough Hall, dedicated 2011

== Education ==
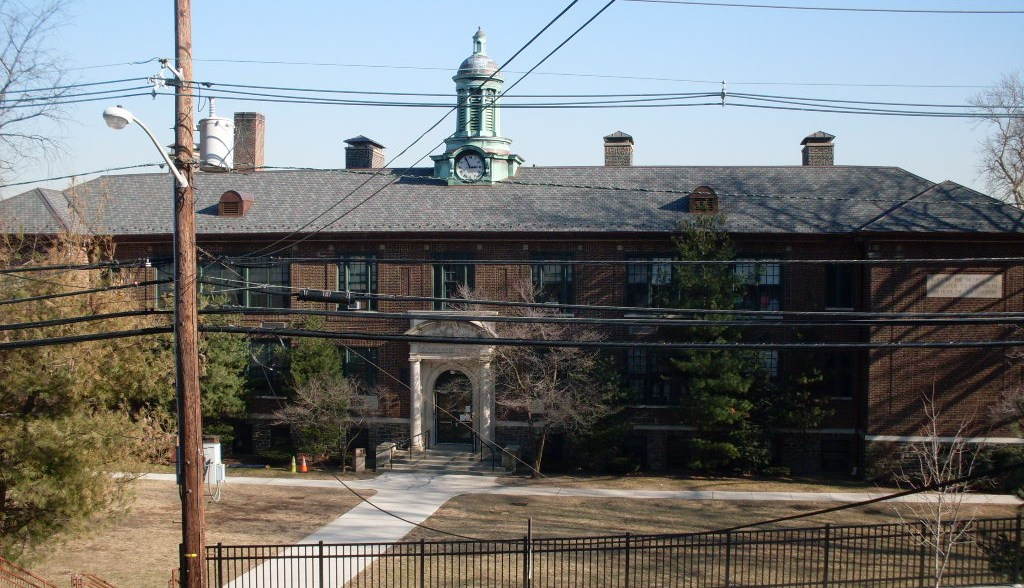
Eleanor Van Gelder Elementary School

The Edgewater Public Schools serves public school students in pre-kindergarten through sixth grade. As of the 2023–24 school year, the district, comprised of two schools, had an enrollment of 685 students and 68.5 classroom teachers (on an FTE basis), for a student–teacher ratio of 10.0:1. Schools in the district (with 2023–24 enrollment data from the National Center for Education Statistics) are George Washington School with 320 students in grades PreK–2 and Eleanor Van Gelder School with 356 students in grades 3–6.

For seventh through twelfth grades, public school students from the borough are sent to the Leonia Public Schools as part of a sending/receiving relationship. Schools in the district attended by Edgewater students (with 2023–24 enrollment data from the National Center for Education Statistics) are Leonia Middle School with 675 students in grades 6–8 (Edgewater students attend for grades 7–8) and Leonia High School with 814 students in grades 9–12.

Public school students from the borough, and all of Bergen County, are eligible to attend the secondary education programs offered by the Bergen County Technical Schools, which include the Bergen County Academies in Hackensack, and the Bergen Tech campus in Teterboro or Paramus. The district offers programs on a shared-time or full-time basis, with admission based on a selective application process and tuition covered by the student's home school district.

Holy Rosary Church in Edgewater is one of the sponsors of the Christ the Teacher School, an interparochial Catholic K–8 school of the Roman Catholic Archdiocese of Newark, in Fort Lee.

== In popular culture ==
Edgewater was used as a filming location for the 1997 feature film Cop Land, starring Sylvester Stallone, Robert De Niro, Harvey Keitel and Ray Liotta.

== Transportation ==
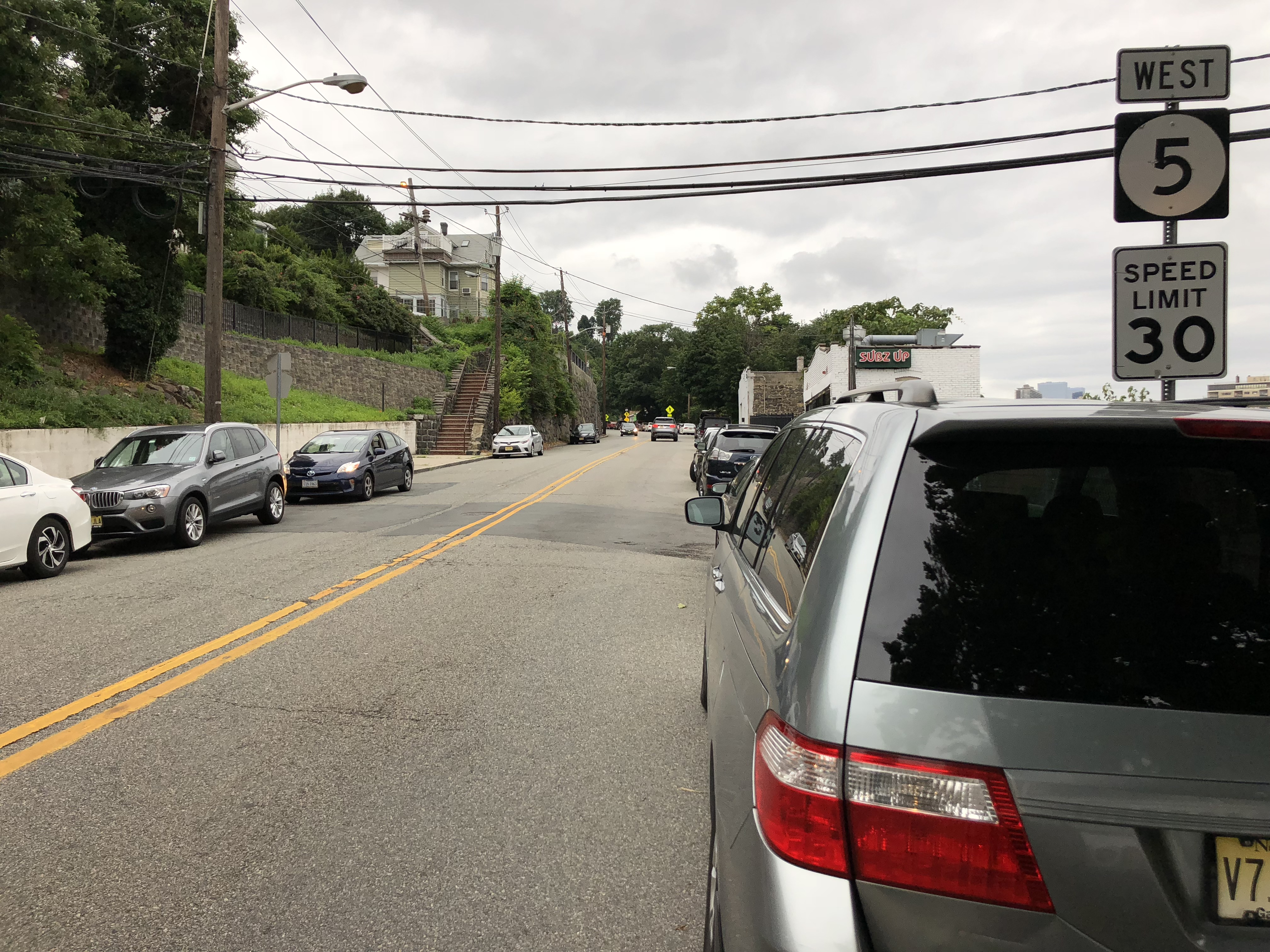
View west along Route 5 in Edgewater

=== Roads and highways ===
As of May 2010, the borough had a total of 11.19 miles (18.01 km) of roadways, of which 6.38 miles (10.27 km) were maintained by the municipality, 4.03 miles (6.49 km) by Bergen County and 0.78 miles (1.26 km) by the New Jersey Department of Transportation.

County Route 505 is the main north–south road in the borough. Route 5 also passes through and ends at CR 505.

Interstate 95 (both the New Jersey Turnpike and George Washington Bridge), U.S. Routes 1/9, U.S. Route 46 and the Palisades Interstate Parkway are all nearby and accessible via CR 505 in Fort Lee.

=== Public transportation ===
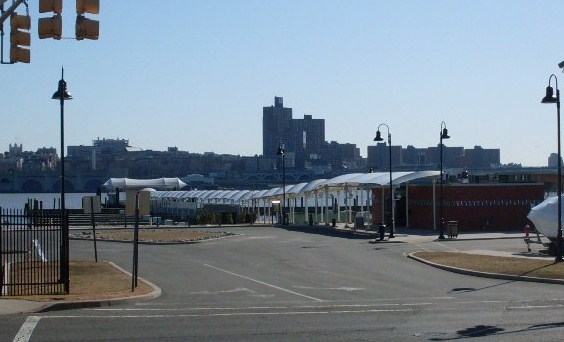
Edgewater Landing on upriver side

New Jersey Transit buses include the 156, 158 and 159 routes serving the Port Authority Bus Terminal in Midtown Manhattan; the 188 to the George Washington Bridge Bus Terminal; and local service on the 751 and 755 routes.

Ferry service to West Midtown Ferry Terminal in Manhattan is offered by NY Waterway at Edgewater Landing, located where Route 5 comes into River Road. Parking at the terminal is not available; however a shuttle bus operated by the borough is available to transport passengers to the landing. In Manhattan there is free transfer to a network of buses operated by NY Waterways.

Several ferries operated in Edgewater in the past, with the old Edgewater Ferry Terminal historically located about 100 yards from the current ferry terminal. The last ferry in the 20th century crossed the river in 1950. The borough was also the site of the trolley terminal for numerous electric lines in New Jersey. Situated across River Road from the old Ferry Terminal, it met passengers arriving from Manhattan. Its service included transportation to the top of Palisades Cliff. The trolley stopped running in 1938.

Bike lanes on River Road were completed in July 2012, in connection with a road re-paving project.

== Sister cities ==
On November 16, 2020, Mayor Michael McPartland proclaimed a sister city relationship with Loma De Cabrera, Dominican Republic.

== Notable people ==
People who were born in, residents of, or otherwise closely associated with Edgewater include:

- Ryan Allen (1943–2018), opera singer
- Amerie (born 1978), R&B singer
- Greg Amsinger (born 1979), sportscaster for MLB Network
- Nadiya Anderson (born 1986), television personality known for appearing with her twin sister, Natalie on The Amazing Race and Survivor: San Juan del Sur
- Natalie Anderson (born 1986), television personality who appeared on The Amazing Race with her identical twin sister Nadiya; both later appeared on Survivor: San Juan del Sur, where Natalie was crowned Sole Survivor, winning the show's $1 million prize
- Coco Austin (born 1979), model
- Tyson Beckford (born 1970), model
- Miri Ben-Ari (born 1978), Israeli-American violinist
- Brendan A. Burns (1895–1989), U.S. Army major general
- John F. Callinan (1935-2025), judge of the New Jersey Superior Court
- Cardi B (born 1992), rapper
- Maksim Chmerkovskiy (born 1980), professional dancer on the TV show Dancing with the Stars
- Liz Claman (born 1963), Fox Business Network anchor
- Paige Conners (born 2000), Israeli-American pairs figure skater who competed at the 2018 Winter Olympics with her skating partner, Evgeni Krasnopolski, representing Israel
- Barbara Corcoran (born 1949), real estate agent and investor
- Fred Daibes (born 1956/1957), real estate developer
- Harris Faulkner (born 1965), newscaster and television host for Fox News Channel
- Luke Higgins (1921–1991), football player
- Ice-T (born 1958), rapper and actor
- JoJo (born 1990), singer
- Peter Moraites (1922–2014), Speaker of the New Jersey General Assembly;
- Rachel Noerdlinger (born 1970), publicist, who was chief of staff to Chirlane McCray, the wife of Mayor of New York City Bill de Blasio
- Nick Prisco (1909–1981), football tailback, played one season in the NFL with the Philadelphia Eagles
- Q-Tip (born 1970), rapper
- Will Ramos (born 1993/94), singer who is the lead vocalist of the deathcore band Lorna Shore
- Geraldo Rivera (born 1943), journalist, attorney, author and political commentator
- John Sterling (born 1938), radio broadcaster for the New York Yankees
- Francis R. Tillou (c. 1795–1865), lawyer and politician; operated a ferry between Edgewater and New York City; lived on an estate he called "Tillietudlem", located on the present site of the Edgewater Public Library
- Osi Umenyiora (born 1981), defensive end for the New York Giants
- Chien-Ming Wang (born 1980), pitcher, played for the New York Yankees
- Jim White (1920–1987), NFL tackle, played for the New York Giants
- Norman Joseph Woodland (1921–2012), inventor of the barcode

== Sources ==
- Municipal Incorporations of the State of New Jersey (according to Counties). Prepared by the Division of Local Government, Department of the Treasury (New Jersey); December 1, 1958.
- Adams, Arthur G. (1996). The Hudson River Guidebook. Fordham University Press. ISBN 0-8232-1679-9.
- Clayton, W. Woodford; and Nelson, Nelson. History of Bergen and Passaic Counties, New Jersey, with Biographical Sketches of Many of its Pioneers and Prominent Men. Philadelphia: Everts and Peck, 1882.
- Hall, Donald E.; Edgewater Cultural & Historical Committee (2005). Images of America: Edgewater. Charleston, South Carolina: Arcadia Publishing. p. 128. ISBN 0-7385-3725-X.
- Harvey, Cornelius Burnham (ed.), Genealogical History of Hudson and Bergen Counties, New Jersey. New York: New Jersey Genealogical Publishing Co., 1900.
- Van Valen, James M. History of Bergen County, New Jersey. New York: New Jersey Publishing and Engraving Co., 1900.
- Westervelt, Frances A. (Frances Augusta), 1858–1942, History of Bergen County, New Jersey, 1630–1923, Lewis Historical Publishing Company, 1923.

== See also ==
- List of U.S. cities with significant Korean-American populations
