= Ivory Sully =

American football player (born 1957)

No. 37, 44
- Position: Defensive back

Personal information
- Born: June 20, 1957 (age 69); Salisbury, Maryland, U.S.
- Listed height: 6 ft 0 in (1.83 m)
- Listed weight: 198 lb (90 kg)

Career information
- High school: Leonia (Leonia, New Jersey)
- College: Delaware
- NFL draft: 1979: undrafted

Career history
- Los Angeles Rams (1979–1984); Tampa Bay Buccaneers (1985–1986); Detroit Lions (1987)

Career NFL statistics
- Interceptions: 1
- Fumble recoveries: 12
- Safeties: 1
- Stats at Pro Football Reference

Ivory Sully (born June 20, 1957) is an American former professional football player who was a cornerback in the National Football League (NFL).

Sully grew up in Leonia, New Jersey, and played high school football there at Leonia High School. Undrafted as a running back from Division II Delaware, he was a co-captain of the 1981 and 1982 Los Angeles Rams. He is a member of the University of Delaware Sports Hall of Fame. With a pronounced resemblance to Omar Sharif, he played bit parts in several movies and television shows while playing in Los Angeles.

== High school ==
By the time Sully graduated in 1975, he had a multitude of awards and trophies, including: All State Tennis Champion, All State Track Champion, Boy's State (New Jersey) Leadership Representative of Leonia H.S., Weringer Award for School's Best Athlete, and selected to the All Century Football Team by the Bergen Record newspaper.

== College ==
Sully was named Honorary Captain for the University of Delaware.

== Professional career ==
Sully was signed as a free agent by the Los Angeles Rams, who moved him to safety. There, he was a 1984 Pro Bowl alternate as a special teams player, although the presence of safeties Johnnie Johnson and Nolan Cromwell relegated him to backup status. He was named the Outstanding Special Teams Player of the Year with the Los Angeles Rams five times (1979, 1980, 1982, 1983, and 1984). He was a member of the 1979 NFC Champions, Los Angeles Rams and played in Super Bowl XIV.

== Life after sports ==
=== Apparel ===
Sully successfully transitioned out of football and became the VP Sales, Merchandising & Licensing for Company b In 2001 - 2011 Sully was Vice President of Licensing and International Business for Pelle Pelle as seen on Sully's resume.

=== Film/Movies ===
Sully is on the executive team on "Build It And They Will Come" and "From The Ground Up" a TV reality series about building a professional sports team.

=== Major League Football ===
Sully was named as the officer of branding and licensing for the proposed league called Major League Football (MLFB). The league initially planned to begin play in spring 2016 but failed to launch. The league reorganized in the summer of 2017 and terminated Sully from his position with the league.
