= Leonia Public Schools =

School district in Bergen County, New Jersey, US

Address
- 570 Grand Avenue Leonia, Bergen County, New Jersey, 07605; United States
- Coordinates: 40.871412°N 73.986859°W

District information
- Grades: Pre-K to 12
- Superintendent: Xanthy Karamanos
- Business administrator: Dennis Frohnapfel (Interim)
- Schools: 3

Students and staff
- Enrollment: 2,087 (as of 2023–24)
- Faculty: 191.6 FTEs
- Student–teacher ratio: 10.9:1

Other information
- District Factor Group: GH
- Website: www.leoniaschools.org
| Ind. | Per pupil | District spending | Rank (*) | K-12 average | %± vs. average |
|---|---|---|---|---|---|
| 1A | Total Spending | $18,189 | 37 | $18,891 | −3.7% |
| 1 | Budgetary Cost | 15,269 | 53 | 14,783 | 3.3% |
| 2 | Classroom Instruction | 8,714 | 52 | 8,763 | −0.6% |
| 6 | Support Services | 2,103 | 39 | 2,392 | −12.1% |
| 8 | Administrative Cost | 1,922 | 65 | 1,485 | 29.4% |
| 10 | Operations & Maintenance | 2,056 | 61 | 1,783 | 15.3% |
| 13 | Extracurricular Activities | 401 | 38 | 268 | 49.6% |
| 16 | Median Teacher Salary | 55,460 | 6 | 64,043 |
Data from NJDoE 2014 Taxpayers' Guide to Education Spending. *Of K-12 districts with 1,800-3,500 students. Lowest spending=1; Highest=68

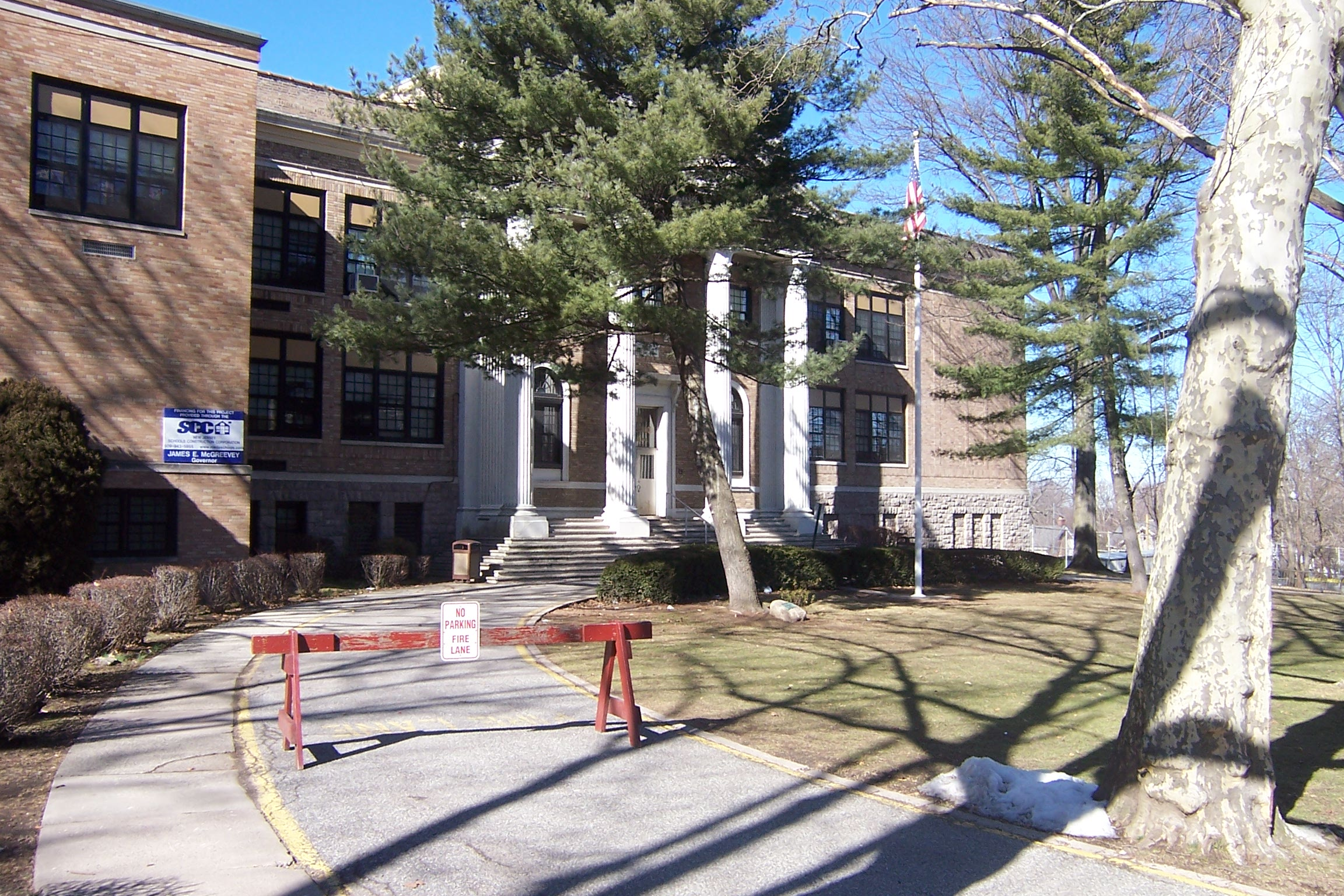
Leonia Middle School (the former Leonia High School campus)

The Leonia Public Schools is a comprehensive community public school district that serves students in pre-kindergarten through twelfth grade from Leonia, in Bergen County, in the U.S. state of New Jersey.

As of the 2023–24 school year, the district, comprised of three schools, had an enrollment of 2,087 students and 191.6 classroom teachers (on an FTE basis), for a student–teacher ratio of 10.9:1.

The district had been classified by the New Jersey Department of Education as being in District Factor Group "GH", the third-highest of eight groupings. District Factor Groups organize districts statewide to allow comparison by common socioeconomic characteristics of the local districts. From lowest socioeconomic status to highest, the categories are A, B, CD, DE, FG, GH, I and J.

Students from Edgewater attend the district's schools for grades 7–12 as part of a sending/receiving relationship with the Edgewater Public Schools.

In 2005, Leonia Middle School finished the construction of its new addition. That marked the completion of the expansion of the Leonia Public Schools, along with the completion of the high school's math and science wing and Anna C. Scott Elementary School's addition and renovation, completed in 2002 and 2001, respectively.

== Schools ==
Schools in the district (with 2023–24 enrollment data from the National Center for Education Statistics) are:

- Anna C. Scott Elementary School with 565 students in grades PreK–4
  - Magdalen Neyra, principal
- Leonia Middle School with 675 students in grades 5–8
  - David Saco, principal
- Leonia High School with 814 students in grades 9–12
  - Charles Kalender, principal

== Administration ==
Core members of the district's administration are:

- Xanthy Karamanos, Acting Superintendent
- Eric Thomasevich, Business Administrator/Board Secretary

== Board of education ==
The district's board of education, comprised of nine members, sets policy and oversees the fiscal and educational operation of the district through its administration. As a Type II school district, the board's trustees are elected directly by voters to serve three-year terms of office on a staggered basis, with three seats up for election each year held (since 2012) as part of the November general election. The board appoints a superintendent to oversee the district's day-to-day operations and a business administrator to supervise the business functions of the district. A tenth representative is appointed to represent Edgewater.
