= Edgewater Public Schools =

School district in Bergen County, New Jersey, US

Address
- 251 Undercliff Avenue Edgewater, Bergen County, New Jersey, 07020; United States
- Coordinates: 40.822044°N 73.978714°W

District information
- Grades: PreK-6
- Superintendent: Billy Cunningham
- Business administrator: James Tevis (interim)
- Schools: 2

Students and staff
- Enrollment: 685 (as of 2023–24)
- Faculty: 68.5 FTEs
- Student–teacher ratio: 10.0:1

Other information
- District Factor Group: GH
- Website: www.edgewaterschools.org
Ind.	Per pupil	District spending	Rank (*)	K-6 average	%± vs. average
1A	Total Spending	$16,457	20	$18,891	−12.9%
1	Budgetary Cost	11,280	6	13,649	−17.4%
2	Classroom Instruction	6,932	5	8,366	−17.1%
6	Support Services	1,459	7	2,161	−32.5%
8	Administrative Cost	1,320	13	1,467	−10.0%
10	Operations & Maintenance	1,510	26	1,552	−2.7%
13	Extracurricular Activities	16	12	39	−59.0%
16	Median Teacher Salary	51,816	9	57,437
Data from NJDoE 2014 Taxpayers' Guide to Education Spending. *Of K-6 districts with any number of students. Lowest spending=1; Highest=59

The Edgewater Public Schools is a community public school district that serves students in kindergarten through sixth grades from Edgewater, in Bergen County, in the U.S. state of New Jersey.

As of the 2023–24 school year, the district, comprised of two schools, had an enrollment of 685 students and 68.5 classroom teachers (on an FTE basis), for a student–teacher ratio of 10.0:1.

For seventh through twelfth grades, public school students from the borough are sent to the Leonia Public Schools as part of a sending/receiving relationship. Schools in the district attended by Edgewater students (with 2023–24 enrollment data from the National Center for Education Statistics) are Leonia Middle School with 675 students in grades 6–8 (Edgewater students attend for grades 7–8) and Leonia High School with 814 students in grades 9–12.

== History ==
With district enrollment increasing rapidly, George Washington School opened in September 2012, having been constructed with a third floor to accommodate enrollment growth in the district that was anticipated to rise from 628 in 2011 to as much as 925 in 2015.

The district had been classified by the New Jersey Department of Education as being in District Factor Group "GH", the third-highest of eight groupings. District Factor Groups organize districts statewide to allow comparison by common socioeconomic characteristics of the local districts. From lowest socioeconomic status to highest, the categories are A, B, CD, DE, FG, GH, I and J.

== Schools ==
Schools in the district (with 2023–24 enrollment data from the National Center for Education Statistics) are:

- George Washington School with 320 students in grades PreK–2
  - Kyle McCormick, principal
- Eleanor Van Gelder School with 356 students in grades 3–6
  - Jonathan Frega, principal

== Administration ==
Core members of the district's administration are:

- Billy Cunningham, superintendent
- James Tevis, interim board secretary and business administrator

== Board of education ==
The district's board of education, comprised of five members, sets policy and oversees the fiscal and educational operation of the district through its administration. As a Type II school district, the board's trustees are elected directly by voters to serve three-year terms of office on a staggered basis, with either one or two seats up for election each year held (since 2012) as part of the November general election. The board appoints a superintendent to oversee the district's day-to-day operations and a business administrator to supervise the business functions of the district.
