= Nick Prisco =

American football player (1909–1981)

No. 18, 77
- Position: Tailback

Personal information
- Born: January 12, 1909; Edgewater, New Jersey, U.S.
- Died: June 13, 1981 (aged 72); Tarpon Springs, Florida, U.S.
- Listed height: 5 ft 8 in (1.73 m)
- Listed weight: 193 lb (88 kg)

Career information
- High school: Leonia (NJ)
- College: Rutgers

Career history
- Philadelphia Eagles (1933); Passaic Red Devils (1933); Stapleton Buffaloes (1936)
- Stats at Pro Football Reference

Nicholas Anthony Prisco (January 12, 1909 – June 13, 1981) was an American professional football tailback who played one season with the Philadelphia Eagles of the National Football League (NFL). He played college football at Rutgers University. His surname has also been spelled as "Priscoe".

== Early life ==
Nicholas Anthony Prisco was born January 12, 1909, in Edgewater, New Jersey. He attended Leonia High School in Leonia, New Jersey.

== College career ==
Prisco was a member of the Rutgers Scarlet Knights of Rutgers University from 1929 to 1932. He was a three-year letterman from 1930 to 1932. He won the George T. Cronin Trophy his senior year in 1932.

== Professional career ==
Prisco played in two games for the NFL's Philadelphia Eagles in 1933.

He played in five games, all starts, for the Passaic Red Devils of the Interstate Football League in 1933, scoring one rushing touchdown and one receiving touchdown.

Prisco appeared in six games, starting five, for the Stapleton Buffaloes of the American Association in 1936.

== Coaching career ==
Prisco became head football coach of the Woodbridge High School Barrons of Woodbridge Township, New Jersey in 1935. He won the state championship in 1938, 1939 and 1960. He was also a physical education teacher and baseball coach at Woodbridge. The school's football field was later renamed "Nicholas Priscoe Field".
