= Josephine Kuuire =

Ghanaian artist and photographer

- Born: Ghana
- Education: University of Ghana
- Occupation: Photographer

Josephine Ngminvielu Kuuire is a Ghanaian photographer, digital artist, graphic designer and activist.

== Early life and education ==
Originally from Ghana, Josephine Ngminvielu Kuuire holds a bachelor's degree in social work and music from the University of Ghana. She began exploring photography as an artist at Leonia High School in New Jersey, where she took a basic and advanced course in photography. Upon her return to Ghana in 2009, she decided to continue her photographic career, and worked as a freelance photographer during her university studies.

== Artistic career ==
Kuuire is the managing director of Aviella Creative. In 2016, the photographer presented her first exhibition, titled Second Chance, at Accra[dot]Alt. It relies on digital manipulation and portraiture to provide alternative representations of the self. The digital artist uses intimacy as an instrument of resistance and a healing process that normalizes social repression.

The artist is inspired by her daily experience and the various challenges of existing as a unique woman. She uses photography to seek freedom, hoping to inspire others to seek theirs, but also to question the social systems established in Ghanaian society.

Some of the themes of her work include architecture, the built environment, structure, and the role of women in historical and contemporary political structures.

In 2016, Kuuire had her first solo exhibition, Second Chance, at Accra[dot]Alt, in Accra, Ghana, an exhibition of self-portraits. Four years later, she participated with other women artists in the Arts for All program: Phase II, initiated by the Creative Arts Council of Ghana. This initiative aims to redecorate the concrete walls of the streets of Accra with giant murals. Co-creator of the project, she also participated in the digital design of the painting on the walls around the Tetteh Qurashie interchange.

For the artist, the mural pays tribute to several women who contributed to the history of Ghana, including Susan Ofori-Atta, the country's first female doctor; Esther Afua Ocloo; Mabel Dove Danquah; Theodosia Okoh; Annie Jiagge, the country's first female lawyer; Laura Adorkor Coffie; Efua Sutherland; Yaa Asantewaa; Melody Millicent Danquah; and Rebecca Naa Dedei Aryeetey.

== Awards ==
In 2017, Kuuire was the winner of the Portraits Ghana Photography Prize, organized by the Dutch Embassy in Ghana and the Nuku Studio. In 2018, her work was shortlisted among the top ten finalists in Ghana for the Kuenyehia Art Prize for Contemporary Ghanaian Arts.
