= Fred Daibes =

American real estate developer

Fred Daibes (born 1956/1957) is an American real estate developer. He was a key figure in the revitalization of Edgewater, New Jersey, and the development of the Gold Coast along the Hudson River.

He and his parents immigrated to the United States from Lebanon in 1969 and his family settled in Edgewater, New Jersey. He graduated from Leonia High School. Daibes got his start working in a masonry company with his father and expanded into contracting and then real-estate development in the 1980s, with projects becoming successively larger and more luxurious.

In November 2013, a group of four people broke into the apartment where Daibes and his wife were sleeping, beat them and stole $2 million in cash, along with jewelry and gold.

In May 2023, the New Jersey State Commission of Investigation released a report that found that elected and appointed New Jersey officials deliberately worked to benefit Daibes with some of them receiving business contracts and one receiving a discounted rent for a luxury apartment.

Daibes is accused of giving senator Robert Menendez and his wife bribes of cash and nine bars of gold bullion in exchange for the senator’s help in a bank fraud case Daibes faced by installing a U.S. attorney who would likely make the prosecution less severe. Some of the gold bars found in the FBI search of the Menendez home had serial numbers connected to the November 2013 robbery from Daibes' apartment.

Daibes was sentenced to 3 years for fraud, to be served concurrently with 7-year bribery sentence.
