= Rebecca Naa Dedei Aryeetey =

Ghanaian business woman, political activist and feminist (1923–1961)

- Born: Rebecca Naa Dedei c. 1923; Osu, Accra
- Died: 22 June 1961 (aged 38)
- Other name: Dedei Ashikishan
- Occupations: Businesswoman; political activist; feminist

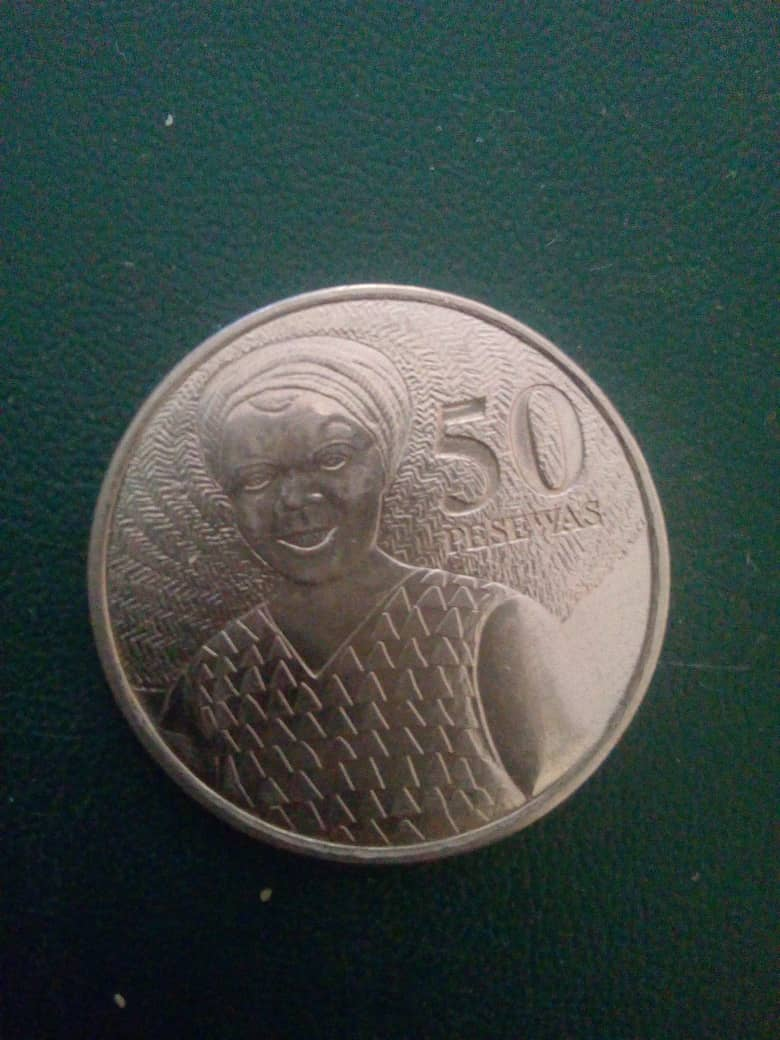
A picture of 50 pesewas coin with the image of Rebecca Naa Dedei Aryeetey

Rebecca Naa Dedei Aryeetey (c. 1923 – 22 June 1961) also known as Dedei Ashikishan, was a Ghanaian business woman, political activist and a feminist. She was popularly known for her flour business in Accra. Her image appears on Ghana's 50 Pesewas coin.

== Early life ==
Rebeca Naa Dedei was born around 1923 at Osu and grew up in James Town, Accra. Her parents were from Ga Asere and Osu.

== Career ==
After her primary education, Naa Dedei went into the flour business. She became so wealthy and influential through her flour business which earned her the name Ashikishan, a Ga word meaning flour. She was known to be the chief financier of the then CPP party and led CPP women activities at her house in Kokomlemle - Accra. As a political activist of the CPP, she campaigned and funded Nkrumah and the CPP party and played a significant role during Ghana's struggle to attain independence. She financed Nkrumah to win the Ashiedu Keteke legislative council seat which made him to be the first Prime Minister of Ghana.

== Death ==
Her closeness to Nkrumah made her an enemy of rival political party which allegedly led to her early death. She died at a CPP function in Ho on 22 June 1961 at the age of 38. It was alleged that she was poisoned at the function after taking a hot tea when she complained of stomach pains.

== Honors ==
The double-decker buses which were brought to Accra by Harry Sawyer were named after her 'Auntie Dedei', she also had her image on a national stamp and on Ghana's 50 pesewa coin, all in honour of her.
