= Jennifer Velez =

American lawyer

New Jersey Human Services Commissioner
- In office June 21, 2007 – February 28, 2015
- Governor: Jon Corzine; Chris Christie
- Succeeded by: Elizabeth Connolly

Personal details
- Born: Englewood, New Jersey
- Spouse: Richard Fiore
- Children: 2
- Education: Drew University; Rutgers School of Law

Jennifer Velez (born 1965 or 1966) is the former Human Services Commissioner for the state of New Jersey. As Commissioner, it was she oversaw New Jersey's Department of Human Services. She served as Commissioner from 2007 to 2015 under Governors Jon Corzine and Chris Christie.

== Early life and education ==
Velez was born in Englewood, New Jersey. Velez's parents divorced when she was still a toddler. Velez's family struggled financially, at times relying on public assistance programs. Velez's mother remarried and the family lived in South Hackensack before moving to a trailer park in Moonachie, New Jersey. Her mother worked as a secretary and her step-father worked in a factory. At a young age, Velez worked two paper routes to earn money. Velez attended Wood-Ridge High School and later Drew University.

After graduating from Drew, Velez spent a year working in the underwriting department of an insurance company. She then returned to school, attending Rutgers Law School.

== Career ==
=== Early career ===
After graduating from law school, Velez began practicing law at Day Pitney. The focus of her practice was labor and employment law. Velez was unhappy in private practice and decided to move to government work after reading a newspaper profile of Bill Waldman, then the longest serving Commissioner of the Department of Human Services. Velez responded to the idea of working with people who needed help and began seeking out a job in the government. Velez's government job was working of the Chief Counsel's office during Republican Governor Christie Todd Whitman's time in office. Velez asked to be assigned to Human Services. She became Deputy Commissioner of the Department of Human Services in 2006.

=== State Human Services Commissioner ===
Governor Jon Corzine appointed Velez the State Human Services Commissioner in February 2007. She was confirmed and sworn in on June 21, 2007. As Commissioner, Velez was responsible for running the Department of Human Services, New Jersey's largest agency. The agency employed 15,000 people and had the largest budget of any individual state department. Following Chris Christie's election as governor in 2009, he reappointed Velez to the position of commissioner.

During her tenure, Velez worked constructively with state legislatures and social services professionals. Velez advocated for individuals with developmental disabilities to live in homes that allow them to be part of the community. Velez oversaw the Medicaid expansion in New Jersey under the Affordable Care Act, providing Medicaid coverage for an additional 300,000 people statewide. Velez helped the state of New Jersey secure a waiver for a Medicaid overhaul in the state in 2012.

The advocacy group Disability Rights New Jersey filed two major lawsuits filed against the state of New Jersey. The group accused the state of improperly segregating people with mental illnesses developmental disabilities. Velez was also criticized for the closing of two developmental centers and a psychiatric hospital which she oversaw. Critics of the closings, including disability advocates and family members of patients, argued the process was rushed and influenced by politics.

In February 2015, Velez announced she would be leaving her post as Commissioner at the end of that month. Her eight-year tenure in the position was the longest in New Jersey history. Upon her resignation, Governor Christie praised Velez as "one of the smartest and most dedicated people" he knew in government and a "tremendous advocate in our efforts to deliver effective, cost-efficient, and high quality services to the most vulnerable New Jerseyans." Velez was succeeded in the position by her chief of staff, Elizabeth Connolly. Connolly was sworn in as Acting Commissioner on February 28, 2015.

=== Return to private sector ===
Upon leaving the position of Commissioner, Velez accepted a position as Senior Vice President for Strategy and Planning at Barnabas Health. She officially joined Barnabas Health on March 10, 2015. In January 2016 was promoted to Senior Vice President of Population and Behavioral Health Integration, Barnabas Health.

== Personal life ==
Velez is married to Richard Fiore, a pharmaceutical industry marketing consultant. The couple has two children.
