= Leopold William Brandenburg =

Leopold William August Brandenburg
- Born: August 11, 1886; Wood-Ridge, New Jersey, US
- Died: Unknown

Leopold William August Brandenburg (born August 11, 1886) was a 20th-century American medical doctor and criminal. He became notorious after surgically changing the fingerprints and "facial contour" of criminal Ronald Philipps, a.k.a. "Roscoe Pitts," in 1941, for which he was sentenced to three years in prison, although the sentence was later overturned. Pitts had attempted to rob a grocery store using explosives in Wilkesboro, North Carolina.

Brandenburg was later sentenced to five years in prison for illicitly prescribing morphine, a narcotic, to patients.

Brandenburg was born in Wood-Ridge, New Jersey, on August 11, 1886.
