= Wood-Ridge High School =

High school in Bergen County, New Jersey, US

Wood-Ridge Jr./Sr. High School
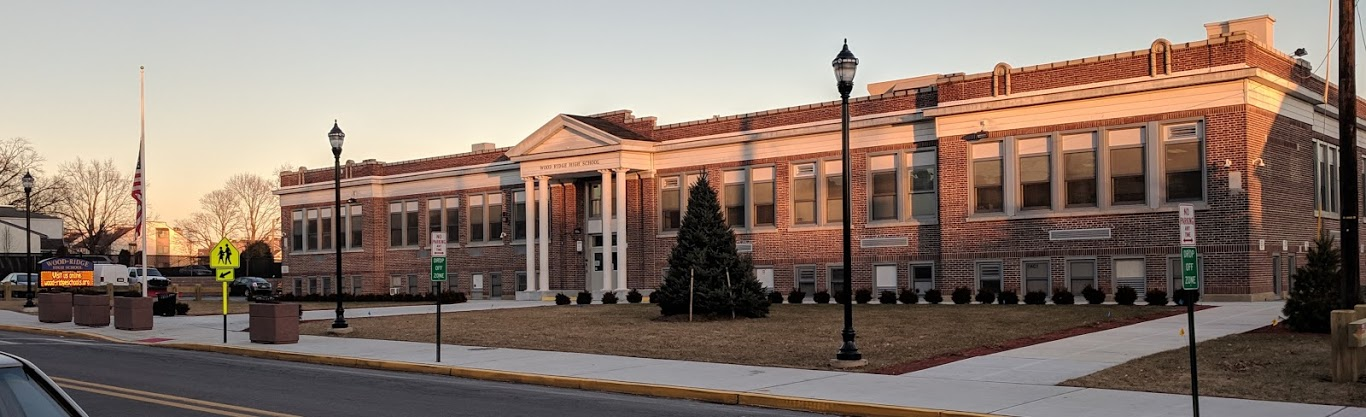

Location
- 258 Hackensack Street; Wood-Ridge, New Jersey, Bergen County, New Jersey, New Jersey 07075; United States; 40.848495°N 74.080791°W

Information
- Type: Public
- Established: 1922
- School district: Wood-Ridge School District
- NCES School ID: 341830000922
- Principal: Silvia Raguseo-Ruiz
- Faculty: 46.4 FTEs
- Grades: 7-12
- Enrollment: 522 (as of 2023–24)
- Student to teacher ratio: 11.3:1
- Colors: Blue and white Black Grey
- Athletics conference: North Jersey Interscholastic Conference
- Team name: Blue Devils
- Publication: The Devil's Advocate
- Website: www.wood-ridgeschools.org/o/wrhs

Wood-Ridge Junior / Senior High School (commonly known as Wood-Ridge High School) is a six-year comprehensive public high school that serves students in seventh through twelfth grade from Wood-Ridge, in Bergen County, in the U.S. state of New Jersey, operating as the lone secondary school of the Wood-Ridge School District. The school was established in 1922.

As of the 2023–24 school year, the school had an enrollment of 522 students and 46.4 classroom teachers (on an FTE basis), for a student–teacher ratio of 11.3:1. There were 7 students (1.3% of enrollment) eligible for free lunch and 23 (4.4% of students) eligible for reduced-cost lunch.

Approximately 100 public school students from Moonachie attend Wood-Ridge High School, as part of a sending/receiving relationship with the Moonachie School District.

== Awards, recognition and rankings ==
The school was the 232nd-ranked public high school in New Jersey out of 339 schools statewide in New Jersey Monthly magazine's September 2014 cover story on the state's "Top Public High Schools", using a new ranking methodology. The school had been ranked 176th in the state of 328 schools in 2012, after being ranked 137th in 2010 out of 322 schools listed. The magazine ranked the school 101st in 2008 out of 316 schools. The school was ranked 143rd in the magazine's September 2006 issue, which surveyed 316 schools across the state.

== Athletics ==
The Wood-Ridge High School Blue Devils participate in the North Jersey Interscholastic Conference, which is comprised of small-enrollment schools in Bergen, Hudson County, Morris County and Passaic County counties, and was created following a reorganization of sports leagues in Northern New Jersey by the New Jersey State Interscholastic Athletic Association (NJSIAA). Prior to the NJSIAA's realignment that took effect in the fall of 2010, Wood-Ridge was a member of the Bergen County Scholastic League (BCSL). With 327 students in grades 10-12, the school was classified by the NJSIAA for the 2019–20 school year as Group I for most athletic competition purposes, which included schools with an enrollment of 75 to 476 students in that grade range. The school was classified by the NJSIAA as Group I North for football for 2024–2026, which included schools with 254 to 474 students.

Interscholastic programs available at the high school include:

Wood-Ridge School District Athletics

Fall

- Football
- Volleyball
- Cheerleading
- Soccer (Boys & Girls)

Winter

- Bowling (Boys & Girls)
- Wrestling
- Indoor track (Boys & Girls)
- Winter Cheerleading
- Basketball (Boys & Girls)

Spring

- Baseball
- Softball
- Track & Field (Boys & Girls)
- Golf
- Girls Flag Football

=== Baseball ===
- NJC champions - 1960, 1966, 1972 (co-champions), 2016 (co-champions)
- Bergen County Tournament champions - 1972
- BCSL Olympic champions - 1981, 1987
- Sectional champions (North I, Group I), 1960, 1961, 1965 and 1968.

=== Boys basketball ===
- State champions (North I Group I) - 1962, 1963, 1977, 1978, 2011, 2019
- Group I state champions - 1979 (finishing 28-1 after a 74-58 tournament final win against Wildwood High School)
- BCSL Olympic champions - 1977, 1978, 1979, 1980, 1981
- BCSL National champions - 2003, 2006, 2008
- NJIC Meadowlands champions - 2011
- All Century Bergen County - Jimmy Hawthorne
- All Decade (1970-1979) Bergen County - Fred Ketcho

=== Girls basketball ===
- BCSL Olympic champions - 1978, 1979

=== Bowling ===
- BCSL Olympic champions - 1991, 1992, 1993, 1995, 1996, 1997, 2010
- BCSL National champions - 2005
- BCCA Tournament champions - 1986, 1997

=== Cheerleading (competition) ===
- Spirit Unlimited National Champions - 2003
- Cheer & Dance Extreme National Grand Champions - 2005
- Americheer International Grand Champions - 2007, 2009, 2010, 2011, 2012, 2013, 2014, 2015
- Quest For the Best Champions - 2007, 2008
- NJCDCA All-Music State Champions - 2009, 2013, 2014, 2015

=== Cross country ===
- BCSL National champions - 1989

=== Football ===
- State champions (North I Group I) - 1949, 1970, 1977
- Sectional champions - 1960, 1965
- BCSL Olympic champions - 1972, 1977, 1986

=== Golf ===
- BCSL champions - 1976

=== Girls soccer ===
- BCSL National champions - 1998, 2001, 2002, 2003, 2004, 2005, 2006, 2007, 2008, 2009, 2010
- State sectional champions (North I Group II) - 2008 (as joint team with Hasbrouck Heights High School)

=== Softball ===
- State champions (North I Group I) - 1976, 1977, 1983, 2010
- BCSL Olympic champions - 1975, 1976, 1978, 1979, 1981
- BCSL National champions - 2009

=== Boys tennis ===
- BCSL National champions - 2004, 2005, 2009

=== Girls tennis ===
- BCSL National champions - 2004, 2005, 2006, 2008 (Co-Champs), 2010

=== Boys track and field ===
- State sectional champions - 2007
- BCSL National champions - 2008

=== Girls track and field ===
- BCSL National champions - 2004, 2005

=== Volleyball ===
- BCSL Olympic champions - 1989, 1991
- BCSL National champions - 2007 (Co-Champs)
- NJIC Meadowlands Division Champions - 2010, 2011, 2016, 2017, 2018, 2019
- NJIC Conference Tournament Champions - 2018

=== Wrestling ===
- BCSL Olympic champions - 1976
- BCSL National champions - 2003, 2004, 2005, 2007, 2008
- District 5 champions - 1981
- District 15 champions - 2002, 2004, 2006, 2007
- State sectional (North II Group I) - 2006, 2007
- Bergen County Tournament champions - 2007

=== NJSIAA Sportsmanship Award ===
- 2000-01, 2007–08

== Administration ==
The school's principal is Silvia Raguseo-Ruiz. Her core administration team includes the assistant principal / athletic director, Marc Sinclair.

== Notable alumni ==
- Alex Boniello (born 1990), actor best known for his portrayal of the Voice of Moritz in the 2015 Broadway revival of Spring Awakening
- Leonard T. Connors (1929-2016), politician who served in the New Jersey Senate from 1982 to 2008 representing the 9th Legislative District and was the Mayor of Surf City, New Jersey from 1966 to 2015
- Paul Sarlo (born 1968), construction industry executive and politician who has served in the New Jersey Senate since 2003, where he represents the 36th Legislative District
- Jennifer Velez (born 1965 or 1966), former Commissioner of the New Jersey Department of Human Services
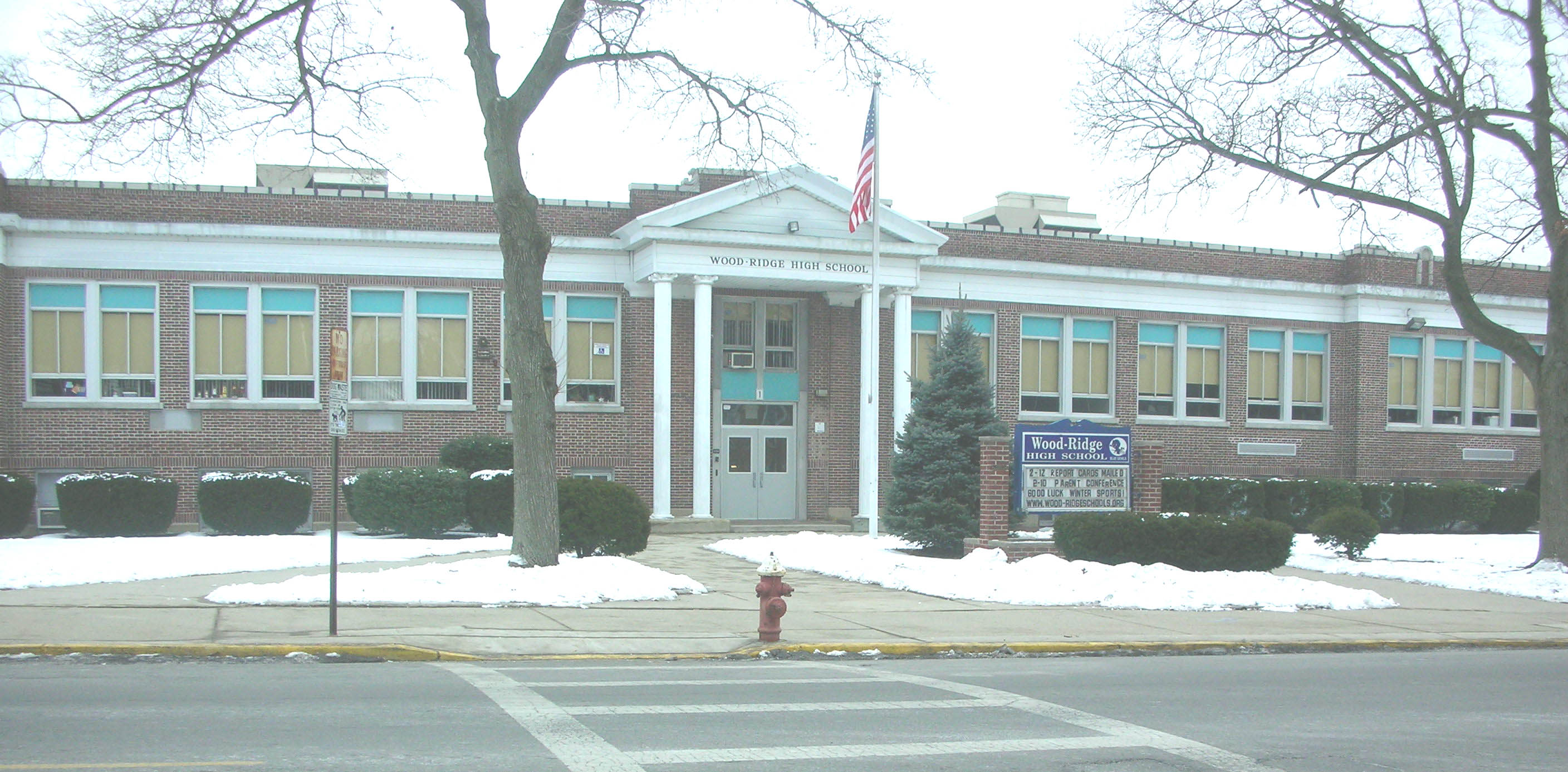
Wood-Ridge High School, February 2009
