= Moonachie, New Jersey =

Borough in Bergen County, New Jersey, US

- Borough
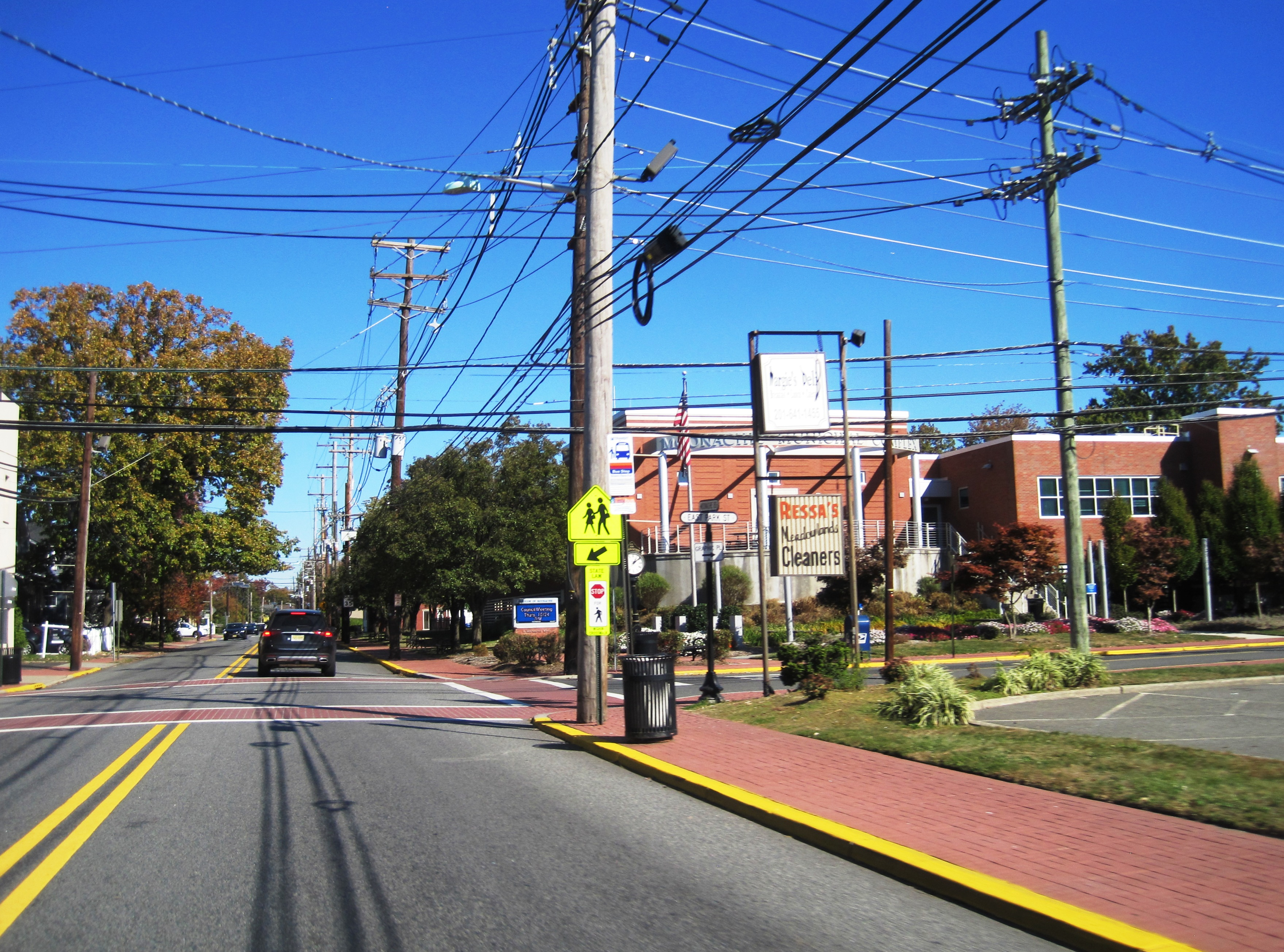
- Center of Moonachie along CR 503 (Moonachie Road); the municipal building is in the background on the right

- Seal

- Location of Moonachie in Bergen County highlighted in red (left). Inset map: Location of Bergen County in New Jersey highlighted in orange (right).

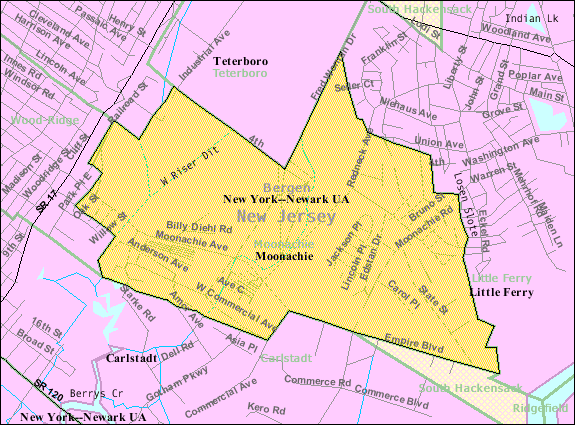
- Census Bureau map of Moonachie, New Jersey

- Location in Bergen County Location in New Jersey Location in the United States
- Coordinates: 40.841334°N 74.057671°W
- Country: United States
- State: New Jersey
- County: Bergen
- Incorporated: May 3, 1910

Government
  - Type: Borough
  - Body: Borough Council
  - Mayor: Dennis Vaccaro (D, term ends December 31, 2026)
  - Administrator: Anthony Ciannamea
  - Municipal clerk: Supriya Sanyal

Area
  - Total: 1.74 sq mi (4.51 km^{2})
  - Land: 1.73 sq mi (4.48 km^{2})
  - Water: 0.012 sq mi (0.03 km^{2}) 0.69%
  - Rank: 427th of 565 in state 54th of 70 in county
- Elevation: 3 ft (0.91 m)

Population (2020)
  - Total: 3,133
  - Estimate (2023): 3,108
  - Rank: 444th of 565 in state 66th of 70 in county
  - Density: 1,810.9/sq mi (699.2/km^{2})
  - Rank: 308th of 565 in state 59th of 70 in county
- Time zone: UTC−05:00 (Eastern (EST))
  - Summer (DST): UTC−04:00 (Eastern (EDT))
- ZIP Code: 07074
- Area code: 201
- FIPS code: 3400347700
- GNIS feature ID: 0885307
- Website: www.moonachie.us

Moonachie (English pronunciation: /muːˈnɑːki/) is a borough in Bergen County, in the U.S. state of New Jersey, in the Hackensack River watershed. As of the 2020 United States census, the borough's population was 3,133, an increase of 425 (+15.7%) from the 2010 census count of 2,708, which in turn reflected a decline of 46 (−1.7%) from the 2,754 counted in the 2000 census.

Moonachie was incorporated as a borough by an act of the New Jersey Legislature on April 11, 1910, from portions of Lodi Township, based on the results of a referendum held on May 3, 1910. On March 26, 1917, portions of Moonachie were taken to form Teterboro.

== Name ==
Tradition is that the borough was named after Monaghie, an Iroquois chief who inhabited the local cedar forests in the 1600s.

The name of the borough is pronounced "moo-NAH-kee"; however, in January 1987, then-mayor of New York City Ed Koch pronounced it "mah-NOO-chee" when he made his now-famous quip that the New York Giants should hold their victory parade in the borough after the team had just won Super Bowl XXI. Koch had refused to grant the Giants permission to hold a parade within the city limits because the team plays its home games in New Jersey, not in New York City.

== Geography ==
According to the United States Census Bureau, the borough had a total area of 1.74 square miles (4.51 km^{2}), including 1.73 square miles (4.48 km^{2}) of land and 0.01 square miles (0.03 km^{2}) of water (0.69%).

The borough is approximately 9 miles (14 km) northwest of downtown Manhattan in New York City. Nearby is East Rutherford, in which can be found the Meadowlands Sports Complex, home to the National Football League's New York Giants and New York Jets, and a racetrack at which both thoroughbred horse racing and harness racing are conducted. Portions of Teterboro Airport are located in Moonachie.

The borough borders the Bergen County municipalities of Carlstadt, Hasbrouck Heights, Little Ferry, South Hackensack, Teterboro and Wood-Ridge.

== Demographics ==
Historical population
Census	Pop.	Note	%±
1900	212		—
1910	638		200.9%
1920	1,194		87.1%
1930	1,465		22.7%
1940	1,554		6.1%
1950	1,775		14.2%
1960	3,052		71.9%
1970	2,951		−3.3%
1980	2,706		−8.3%
1990	2,817		4.1%
2000	2,754		−2.2%
2010	2,708		−1.7%
2020	3,133		15.7%
2023 (est.)	3,108	▼	−0.8%
Population sources: 1910–1920 1910; 1910–1930 1900–2020; 2000 2010 2020

=== Racial and ethnic composition ===
Moonachie borough, New Jersey – Racial and ethnic composition Note: the US Census treats Hispanic/Latino as an ethnic category. This table excludes Latinos from the racial categories and assigns them to a separate category. Hispanics/Latinos may be of any race.
Race / Ethnicity (NH = Non-Hispanic)	Pop 2000	Pop 2010	Pop 2020	% 2000	% 2010	% 2020
White alone (NH)	2,143	1,708	1,391	77.81%	63.07%	44.40%
Black or African American alone (NH)	22	23	20	0.80%	0.85%	0.64%
Native American or Alaska Native alone (NH)	2	0	0	0.07%	0.00%	0.00%
Asian alone (NH)	175	267	351	6.35%	9.86%	11.20%
Native Hawaiian or Pacific Islander alone (NH)	0	0	0	0.00%	0.00%	0.00%
Other race alone (NH)	4	8	27	0.15%	0.30%	0.86%
Mixed race or Multiracial (NH)	59	42	52	2.14%	1.55%	1.66%
Hispanic or Latino (any race)	349	660	1,292	12.67%	24.37%	41.24%
Total	2,754	2,708	3,133	100.00%	100.00%	100.00%

=== 2020 census ===
As of the 2020 census, Moonachie had a population of 3,133. The median age was 41.6 years. 20.7% of residents were under the age of 18 and 16.7% were 65 years of age or older. For every 100 females there were 95.9 males, and for every 100 females age 18 and older there were 92.6 males.

All residents lived in urban areas, while 0.0% lived in rural areas.

There were 1,120 households, of which 32.6% had children under the age of 18 living in them. Of all households, 46.1% were married-couple households, 21.3% had a male householder with no spouse or partner present, and 26.9% had a female householder with no spouse or partner present. About 23.9% of all households were made up of individuals, and 10.3% had someone living alone who was 65 years of age or older.

There were 1,149 housing units, of which 2.5% were vacant. The homeowner vacancy rate was 1.4% and the rental vacancy rate was 2.2%.

=== 2010 census ===
The 2010 United States census counted 2,708 people, 1,005 households, and 702 families in the borough. The population density was 1,626.5 per square mile (628.0/km^{2}). There were 1,053 housing units at an average density of 632.5 per square mile (244.2/km^{2}). The racial makeup was 76.59% (2,074) White, 1.40% (38) Black or African American, 0.11% (3) Native American, 10.04% (272) Asian, 0.00% (0) Pacific Islander, 8.57% (232) from other races, and 3.29% (89) from two or more races. Hispanic or Latino of any race were 24.37% (660) of the population.

Of the 1,005 households, 26.8% had children under the age of 18; 49.6% were married couples living together; 14.0% had a female householder with no husband present and 30.1% were non-families. Of all households, 24.8% were made up of individuals and 11.3% had someone living alone who was 65 years of age or older. The average household size was 2.69 and the average family size was 3.24.

18.5% of the population were under the age of 18, 8.9% from 18 to 24, 23.5% from 25 to 44, 32.9% from 45 to 64, and 16.2% who were 65 years of age or older. The median age was 44.4 years. For every 100 females, the population had 97.2 males. For every 100 females ages 18 and older there were 95.2 males.

The Census Bureau's 2006–2010 American Community Survey showed that (in 2010 inflation-adjusted dollars) median household income was $53,500 (with a margin of error of +/− $6,570) and the median family income was $67,288 (+/− $10,087). Males had a median income of $52,647 (+/− $4,166) versus $42,670 (+/− $7,039) for females. The per capita income for the borough was $27,918 (+/− $2,593). About 4.0% of families and 6.6% of the population were below the poverty line, including 1.4% of those under age 18 and 12.9% of those age 65 or over.

Same-sex couples headed four households in 2010, the same number as was counted in 2000.

=== 2000 census ===
As of the 2000 United States census there were 2,754 people, 1,041 households, and 707 families residing in the borough. The population density was 1,596.5 inhabitants per square mile (616.4/km^{2}). There were 1,074 housing units at an average density of 622.6 per square mile (240.4/km^{2}). The racial makeup of the borough was 85.66% White, 0.94% African American, 0.11% Native American, 6.64% Asian, 2.94% from other races, and 3.70% from two or more races. Hispanic or Latino of any race were 12.67% of the population.

There were 1,041 households, out of which 28.1% had children under the age of 18 living with them, 52.6% were married couples living together, 10.8% had a female householder with no husband present, and 32.0% were non-families. 27.8% of all households were made up of individuals, and 11.4% had someone living alone who was 65 years of age or older. The average household size was 2.65 and the average family size was 3.27.

The population in the borough was spread out, with 20.9% under the age of 18, 7.6% from 18 to 24, 30.1% from 25 to 44, 26.1% from 45 to 64, and 15.3% who were 65 years of age or older. The median age was 40 years. For every 100 females, there were 96.9 males. For every 100 females age 18 and over, there were 95.6 males.

The median income for a household in the borough was $50,571, and the median income for a family was $62,163. Males had a median income of $41,875 versus $32,829 for females. The per capita income for the borough was $24,654. About 1.7% of families and 3.8% of the population were below the poverty line, including 3.8% of those under age 18 and 6.3% of those age 65 or over.

== Government ==
=== Local government ===
Moonachie is governed under the borough form of New Jersey municipal government, which is used in 218 municipalities (of the 564) statewide, making it the most common form of government in New Jersey. The governing body is comprised of a mayor and a borough council, with all positions elected at-large on a partisan basis as part of the November general election. A mayor is elected directly by the voters to a four-year term of office. The borough council includes six members elected to serve three-year terms on a staggered basis, with two seats coming up for election each year in a three-year cycle. The borough form of government used by Moonachie is a "weak mayor / strong council" government in which council members act as the legislative body with the mayor presiding at meetings and voting only in the event of a tie. The mayor can veto ordinances subject to an override by a two-thirds majority vote of the council. The mayor makes committee and liaison assignments for council members, and most appointments are made by the mayor with the advice and consent of the council.

As of 2023, the mayor of Moonachie is Democrat Dennis Vaccaro, whose term of office ends December 31, 2026. Members of the Borough Council are Robert J. Bauer Sr. (D, 2025), Antonio Cirillo (D, 2023), Kathleen M. Kinsella (D, 2025), Manuel Martinez Jr. (D, 2023), Bruce B. Surak (D, 2024) and John R. Wende (D, 2024).

=== Federal, state and county representation ===
Moonachie is located in the 9th Congressional District and is part of New Jersey's 38th state legislative district.

For the 119th United States Congress, New Jersey's 9th congressional district is represented by Nellie Pou (D, North Haledon) New Jersey is represented in the United States Senate by Democrats Cory Booker (Newark, term ends 2027) and Andy Kim (Moorestown, term ends 2031).

For the 2026–2027 session, the 38th legislative district of the New Jersey Legislature is represented in the State Senate by Joseph Lagana (D, Paramus) and in the General Assembly by Lisa Swain (D, Fair Lawn) and Chris Tully (D, Bergenfield).

Bergen County is governed by a directly elected County Executive, with legislative functions performed by a Board of County Commissioners comprised of seven members who are elected at-large to three-year terms in partisan elections on a staggered basis, with either two or three seats coming up for election each November; a Chairman and Vice Chairman are selected from among its seven members at a reorganization meeting held every January. As of 2025, the county executive is James J. Tedesco III (D, Paramus), whose four-year term of office ends December 31, 2026.

Bergen County's Commissioners are Chair Mary J. Amoroso (D, Mahwah, 2025), Vice Chair Steven A. Tanelli (D, North Arlington, 2027), Chair Pro Tem Joan Voss (D, Fort Lee, 2026), Rafael Marte (D, Bergenfield, 2026), Germaine M. Ortiz (D, Emerson, 2025), Thomas J. Sullivan Jr. (D, Montvale, 2025) and Tracy Silna Zur (D, Franklin Lakes, 2027).

Bergen County's elected constitutional officials are Clerk John S. Hogan (D, Northvale, 2026), Sheriff Anthony Cureton (D, Englewood, 2027) and Surrogate Michael R. Dressler (D, Cresskill, 2026).

=== Politics ===
United States presidential election results for Moonachie 2024 2020 2016 2012 2008 2004
Year	Republican		Democratic		Third party(ies)	
Year	No.	%	No.	%	No.	%
2024	683	57.25%	489	40.99%	21	1.76%
2020	608	47.61%	656	51.37%	13	1.02%
2016	545	47.64%	572	50.00%	27	2.36%
2012	349	36.97%	584	61.86%	11	1.17%
2008	539	47.45%	586	51.58%	11	0.97%
2004	559	50.00%	542	48.48%	17	1.52%

As of March 2011, there were a total of 1,465 registered voters in Moonachie, of which 632 (43.1% vs. 31.7% countywide) were registered as Democrats, 199 (13.6% vs. 21.1%) were registered as Republicans and 633 (43.2% vs. 47.1%) were registered as Unaffiliated. There was one voter registered to another party. Among the borough's 2010 Census population, 54.1% (vs. 57.1% in Bergen County) were registered to vote, including 66.4% of those ages 18 and over (vs. 73.7% countywide).

In the 2016 presidential election, Democrat Hillary Clinton received 572 votes (49.7% vs. 54.2%), ahead of Republican Donald Trump with 545 votes (47.4% vs. 41.1% countywide) and other candidates with 33 votes (2.9% vs. 4.6%), among the 1,161 ballots cast by the borough's 1,664 registered voters, for a turnout of 69.8% (vs. 72.5% in Bergen County). In the 2012 presidential election, Democrat Barack Obama received 584 votes (61.1% vs. 54.8% countywide), ahead of Republican Mitt Romney with 349 votes (36.5% vs. 43.5%) and other candidates with 11 votes (1.2% vs. 0.9%), among the 956 ballots cast by the borough's 1,573 registered voters, for a turnout of 60.8% (vs. 70.4% in Bergen County). In the 2008 presidential election, Democrat Barack Obama received 586 votes (51.3% vs. 53.9% countywide), ahead of Republican John McCain with 539 votes (47.2% vs. 44.5%) and other candidates with 11 votes (1.0% vs. 0.8%), among the 1,143 ballots cast by the borough's 1,537 registered voters, for a turnout of 74.4% (vs. 76.8% in Bergen County). In the 2004 presidential election, Republican George W. Bush received 559 votes (49.9% vs. 47.2% countywide), ahead of Democrat John Kerry with 542 votes (48.3% vs. 51.7%) and other candidates with 17 votes (1.5% vs. 0.7%), among the 1,121 ballots cast by the borough's 1,547 registered voters, for a turnout of 72.5% (vs. 76.9% in the whole county).

Gubernatorial election results for Moonachie
Year	Republican		Democratic		Third party(ies)	
Year	No.	%	No.	%	No.	%
2025	416	48.71%	436	51.05%	2	0.23%
2021	297	46.62%	331	51.96%	9	1.41%
2017	188	38.84%	289	59.71%	7	1.45%
2013	369	64.96%	188	33.10%	11	1.94%
2009	296	42.53%	348	50.00%	52	7.47%
2005	231	34.79%	410	61.75%	23	3.46%

In the 2013 gubernatorial election, Republican Chris Christie received 65.0% of the vote (369 cast), ahead of Democrat Barbara Buono with 33.1% (188 votes), and other candidates with 1.9% (11 votes), among the 587 ballots cast by the borough's 1,499 registered voters (19 ballots were spoiled), for a turnout of 39.2%. In the 2009 gubernatorial election, Democrat Jon Corzine received 348 ballots cast (48.6% vs. 48.0% countywide), ahead of Republican Chris Christie with 296 votes (41.3% vs. 45.8%), Independent Chris Daggett with 43 votes (6.0% vs. 4.7%) and other candidates with 9 votes (1.3% vs. 0.5%), among the 716 ballots cast by the borough's 1,469 registered voters, yielding a 48.7% turnout (vs. 50.0% in the county).

United States Senate election results for Moonachie1
Year	Republican		Democratic		Third party(ies)	
Year	No.	%	No.	%	No.	%
2024	546	51.85%	478	45.39%	29	2.75%
2018	294	39.46%	412	55.30%	39	5.23%
2012	255	30.95%	551	66.87%	18	2.18%
2006	265	40.71%	375	57.60%	11	1.69%

United States Senate election results for Moonachie2
Year	Republican		Democratic		Third party(ies)	
Year	No.	%	No.	%	No.	%
2020	518	42.67%	663	54.61%	33	2.72%
2014	135	29.80%	308	67.99%	10	2.21%
2013	122	40.53%	174	57.81%	5	1.66%
2008	395	39.46%	587	58.64%	19	1.90%

== Education ==
Public school students in pre-kindergarten through eighth grade are served by the Moonachie School District at the Robert L. Craig School. As of the 2018–19 school year, the district, comprised of one school, had an enrollment of 317 students and 30.7 classroom teachers (on an FTE basis), for a student–teacher ratio of 10.3:1.

For ninth through twelfth grades, approximately 100 public school students from the borough attend Wood-Ridge High School in Wood-Ridge, as part of a sending/receiving relationship with the Wood-Ridge School District. As of the 2018–19 school year, the high school had an enrollment of 583 students and 46.9 classroom teachers (on an FTE basis), for a student–teacher ratio of 12.4:1.

Public school students from the borough, and all of Bergen County, are eligible to attend the secondary education programs offered by the Bergen County Technical Schools, which include the Bergen County Academies in Hackensack, and the Bergen Tech campus in Teterboro or Paramus. The district offers programs on a shared-time or full-time basis, with admission based on a selective application process and tuition covered by the student's home school district.

== Transportation ==
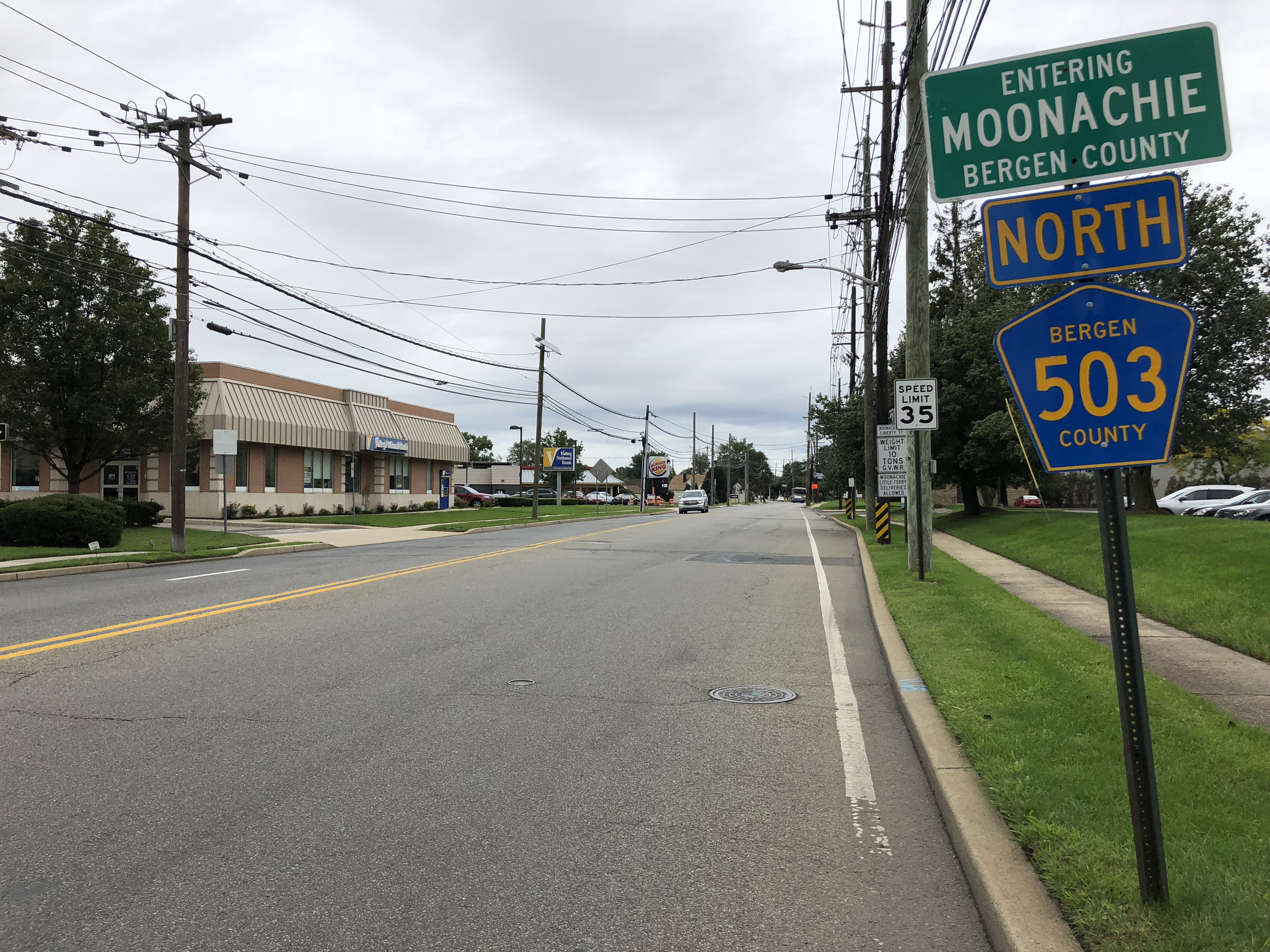
County Route 503 entering Moonachie

=== Roads and highways ===
As of May 2010, the borough had a total of 12.83 miles (20.65 km) of roadways, of which 9.83 miles (15.82 km) were maintained by the municipality and 3.00 miles (4.83 km) by Bergen County.

County Route 503 passes through Moonachie as Moonachie Road.

=== Public transportation ===
NJ Transit bus routes 161, 163, 164 provide service to the Port Authority Bus Terminal in Midtown Manhattan, service to Newark is offered on the 76 route and local service is available on the 703 (rush hour) and 772 bus routes.

== Notable people ==
People who were born in, residents of, or otherwise closely associated with Moonachie include:

- Lottie Brunn (1925–2008), German American acrobat who is believed to be the fastest woman juggler
- Jennifer Velez (born 1965 or 1966), former commissioner of the New Jersey Department of Human Services
- Nikita Whitlock (born 1991), fullback for the New York Giants

== Related reading ==
- Municipal Incorporations of the State of New Jersey (according to Counties) prepared by the Division of Local Government, Department of the Treasury (New Jersey); December 1, 1958.
- Clayton, W. Woodford; and Nelson, William. History of Bergen and Passaic Counties, New Jersey, with Biographical Sketches of Many of its Pioneers and Prominent Men., Philadelphia: Everts and Peck, 1882.
- Harvey, Cornelius Burnham (ed.), Genealogical History of Hudson and Bergen Counties, New Jersey. New York: New Jersey Genealogical Publishing Co., 1900.
- Van Valen, James M. History of Bergen County, New Jersey. New York: New Jersey Publishing and Engraving Co., 1900.
- Westervelt, Frances A. (Frances Augusta), 1858–1942, History of Bergen County, New Jersey, 1630–1923, Lewis Historical Publishing Company, 1923.
