= Wood-Ridge School District =

School district in Bergen County, New Jersey, US

Address
- 540 Windsor Road Wood-Ridge, Bergen County, New Jersey, 07075; United States

District information
- Grades: PreK-12
- Superintendent: Anthony Albro
- Business administrator: Keith Lisa
- Schools: 3

Students and staff
- Enrollment: 1,341 (as of 2024–25)
- Faculty: 105.4 FTEs
- Student–teacher ratio: 12.7:1

Other information
- District Factor Group: FG
- Website: www.wood-ridgeschools.org
Ind.	Per pupil	District spending	Rank (*)	K-12 average	%± vs. average
1A	Total Spending	$16,803	14	$18,891	−11.1%
1	Budgetary Cost	12,307	9	14,783	−16.7%
2	Classroom Instruction	6,521	2	8,763	−25.6%
6	Support Services	1,880	18	2,392	−21.4%
8	Administrative Cost	1,868	40	1,485	25.8%
10	Operations & Maintenance	1,591	24	1,783	−10.8%
13	Extracurricular Activities	439	26	268	63.8%
16	Median Teacher Salary	53,868	8	64,043
Data from NJDoE 2014 Taxpayers' Guide to Education Spending. *Of K-12 districts with up to 1,800 students. Lowest spending=1; Highest=49

The Wood-Ridge School District is a comprehensive community public school district serving students in pre-kindergarten through twelfth grade from Wood-Ridge in Bergen County, in the U.S. state of New Jersey.

As of the 2024–25 school year, the district, comprised of three schools, had an enrollment of 1,341 students and 105.4 classroom teachers (on an FTE basis), for a student–teacher ratio of 12.7:1.

For ninth through twelfth grades, students from Moonachie attend Wood-Ridge High School, as part of a sending/receiving relationship with the Moonachie School District.

== History ==
With the opening of Wood-Ridge Intermediate School in September 2013 for grades 4–6, Doyle Elementary School was realigned to serve students through third grade, while the students in grades 7 and 8 who had attended Gretta R. Ostrovsky Middle School began attending Wood-Ridge Junior / Senior High School.

The district had been classified by the New Jersey Department of Education as being in District Factor Group "FG", the fourth-highest of eight groupings. District Factor Groups organize districts statewide to allow comparison by common socioeconomic characteristics of the local districts. From lowest socioeconomic status to highest, the categories are A, B, CD, DE, FG, GH, I and J.

== Schools ==
Schools in the district (with 2024–25 enrollment data from the National Center for Education Statistics) are:

Elementary school

- Catherine E. Doyle Elementary School with 479 students in PreK through 3rd grade
  - Lara Schmitt, principal

Middle school

- Wood-Ridge Intermediate School with 256 students in grades 4–6
  - Ryan Ann Guglielmotti, principal

High school

- Wood-Ridge High School with 554 students in grades 7–12
  - Silvia Raguseo-Ruiz, principal

== Administration ==
Core members of the district's administration are:

- Anthony Albro, superintendent of schools
- Keith Lisa, business administrator and board secretary

== Board of education ==
The district's board of education, composed of five members, sets policy and oversees the fiscal and educational operation of the district through its administration. As a Type II school district, the board's trustees are elected directly by voters to serve three-year terms of office on a staggered basis, with either one or two seats up for election each year held (since 2014) as part of the November general election. The board appoints a superintendent to oversee the district's day-to-day operations and a business administrator to supervise the business functions of the district. A sixth trustee is appointed by the Moonachie School District to represent its interests on the Wood-Ridge board.
