= Moonachie School District =

School district in Bergen County, New Jersey, US

Address
- 20 West Park Street Moonachie, Bergen County, New Jersey, 07074; United States
- Coordinates: 40.843243°N 74.048383°W

District information
- Grades: Pre-K to 8
- Superintendent: James S. Knipper
- Business administrator: Laurel Spadavecchia
- Schools: 1

Students and staff
- Enrollment: 365 (as of 2022–23)
- Faculty: 35.8 FTEs
- Student–teacher ratio: 10.2:1

Other information
- District Factor Group: B
- Website: www.moonachieschool.org
Ind.	Per pupil	District spending	Rank (*)	K-8 average	%± vs. average
1A	Total Spending	$28,733	68	$18,891	52.1%
1	Budgetary Cost	19,815	60	14,159	39.9%
2	Classroom Instruction	11,628	62	8,659	34.3%
6	Support Services	3,913	61	2,167	80.6%
8	Administrative Cost	1,985	70	1,547	28.3%
10	Operations & Maintenance	2,058	49	1,612	27.7%
13	Extracurricular Activities	106	26	104	1.9%
16	Median Teacher Salary	66,980	64	61,136
Data from NJDoE 2014 Taxpayers' Guide to Education Spending. *Of K-8 districts with up to 400 students. Lowest spending=1; Highest=71

The Moonachie Public Schools is a community public school district that serves students in pre-kindergarten through eighth grade from Moonachie, in Bergen County, in the U.S. state of New Jersey.

As of the 2022–23 school year, the district, comprised of one school, had an enrollment of 365 students and 35.8 classroom teachers (on an FTE basis), for a student–teacher ratio of 10.2:1.

The district is classified by the New Jersey Department of Education as being in District Factor Group "B", the second lowest of eight groupings. District Factor Groups organize districts statewide to allow comparison by common socioeconomic characteristics of the local districts. From lowest socioeconomic status to highest, the categories are A, B, CD, DE, FG, GH, I and J.

For ninth through twelfth grades, approximately 100 public school students attend Wood-Ridge High School in Wood-Ridge, as part of a sending/receiving relationship with the Wood-Ridge School District. As of the 2018–19 school year, the high school had an enrollment of 583 students and 46.9 classroom teachers (on an FTE basis), for a student–teacher ratio of 12.4:1.

== Schools ==
Students in PreK-8 attend the Robert L. Craig School which served 310 students (based on 2018–19 enrollment data from the National Center for Education Statistics).

== Administration ==
Core members of the district's administration are:

- Mr. James S. Knipper, superintendent and principal
- Laurel Spadavecchia, business administrator and board secretary
- Dana Genatt, director of curriculum and instruction

== Board of education ==
The district's board of education, composed of five members, sets policy and oversees the fiscal and educational operation of the district through its administration. As a Type II school district, the board's trustees are elected directly by voters to serve three-year terms of office on a staggered basis, with either one or two seats up for election each year held (since 2012) as part of the November general election. The board appoints a superintendent to oversee the district's day-to-day operations and a business administrator to supervise the business functions of the district.
