= Wood-Ridge, New Jersey =

Borough in Bergen County, New Jersey, US

- Borough
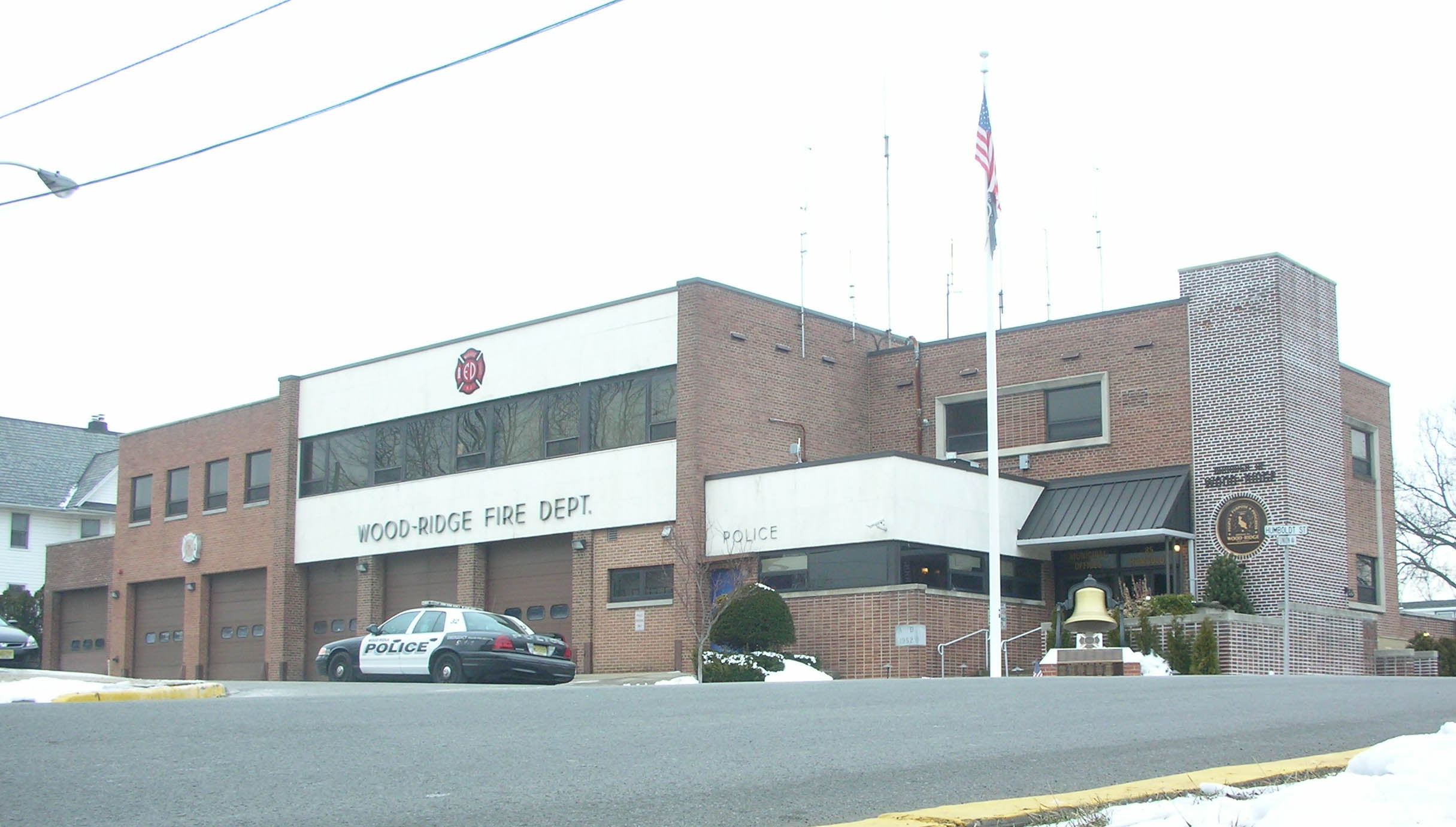
- Wood-Ridge municipal building

- Seal
- Interactive map of Wood-Ridge, New Jersey
- Location in Bergen County Location in New Jersey Location in the United States
- Coordinates: 40.850183°N 74.087068°W
- Country: United States
- State: New Jersey
- County: Bergen
- Incorporated: December 6, 1894

Government
  - Type: Borough
  - Body: Borough Council
  - Mayor: Paul Sarlo (D, term ends December 31, 2027)
  - Administrator: Christopher W. Eilert
  - Municipal clerk: Gina Affuso

Area
  - Total: 1.12 sq mi (2.89 km^{2})
  - Land: 1.11 sq mi (2.88 km^{2})
  - Water: 0 sq mi (0.00 km^{2}) 0.09%
  - Rank: 492nd of 565 in state 62nd of 70 in county
- Elevation: 167 ft (51 m)

Population (2020)
  - Total: 10,137
  - Estimate (2024): 10,397
  - Rank: 241st of 565 in state 37th of 70 in county
  - Density: 9,099.6/sq mi (3,513.4/km^{2})
  - Rank: 42nd of 565 in state 13th of 70 in county
- Time zone: UTC−05:00 (Eastern (EST))
  - Summer (DST): UTC−04:00 (Eastern (EDT))
- ZIP Code: 07075
- Area code: 201
- FIPS code: 3400382570
- GNIS feature ID: 0885451
- Website: njwoodridge.org

Wood-Ridge is a borough in Bergen County, in the U.S. state of New Jersey. As of the 2020 United States census, the borough's population was 10,137, an increase of 2,511 (+32.9%) from the 2010 census count of 7,626, which in turn reflected a decline of 18 (-0.2%) from the 7,644 counted in the 2000 census.

Wood-Ridge was incorporated as a borough by an act of the New Jersey Legislature on December 6, 1894, from portions of Bergen Township, based on the results of a referendum held the previous day. The borough was formed during the "Boroughitis" phenomenon then sweeping through Bergen County, in which 26 boroughs were formed in the county in 1894 alone.

== Geography ==
According to the United States Census Bureau, the borough had a total area of 1.12 square miles (2.89 km^{2}), including 1.11 square miles (2.88 km^{2}) of land and <0.01 square miles (<0.01 km^{2}) of water (0.09%).

The borough is bordered by the Bergen County municipalities of Hasbrouck Heights and Lodi to the north, Wallington to the west, Carlstadt to the south, and Moonachie to the east, along with South Hackensack.

== Demographics ==
Historical population
Census	Pop.	Note	%±
1880	348		—
1890	575		65.2%
1900	582		1.2%
1910	1,043		79.2%
1920	1,923		84.4%
1930	5,159		168.3%
1940	5,739		11.2%
1950	6,283		9.5%
1960	7,964		26.8%
1970	8,311		4.4%
1980	7,929		−4.6%
1990	7,506		−5.3%
2000	7,644		1.8%
2010	7,626		−0.2%
2020	10,137		32.9%
2024 (est.)	10,397	▲	2.6%
Population sources: 1880–1890; 1880–1920 1890–1910; 1910–1930 1900–2020; 2000 2010 2020

=== Racial and ethnic composition ===
Wood-Ridge borough, New Jersey – Racial and ethnic composition Note: the US Census treats Hispanic/Latino as an ethnic category. This table excludes Latinos from the racial categories and assigns them to a separate category. Hispanics/Latinos may be of any race.
Race / Ethnicity (NH = Non-Hispanic)	Pop 2000	Pop 2010	Pop 2020	% 2000	% 2010	% 2020
White alone (NH)	6,562	5,898	6,141	85.85%	77.34%	60.58%
Black or African American alone (NH)	61	95	337	0.80%	1.25%	3.32%
Native American or Alaska Native alone (NH)	5	9	4	0.07%	0.12%	0.04%
Asian alone (NH)	382	538	1,617	5.00%	7.05%	15.95%
Native Hawaiian or Pacific Islander alone (NH)	0	0	0	0.00%	0.00%	0.00%
Other race alone (NH)	4	15	76	0.05%	0.20%	0.75%
Mixed race or Multiracial (NH)	74	71	224	0.97%	0.93%	2.21%
Hispanic or Latino (any race)	556	1,000	1,738	7.27%	13.11%	17.15%
Total	7,644	7,626	10,137	100.00%	100.00%	100.00%

=== 2020 census ===
As of the 2020 census, Wood-Ridge had a population of 10,137. The median age was 38.9 years. 19.8% of residents were under the age of 18 and 14.0% of residents were 65 years of age or older. For every 100 females there were 95.3 males, and for every 100 females age 18 and over there were 92.2 males age 18 and over.

100.0% of residents lived in urban areas, while 0.0% lived in rural areas.

There were 3,920 households in Wood-Ridge, of which 32.0% had children under the age of 18 living in them. Of all households, 56.7% were married-couple households, 15.3% were households with a male householder and no spouse or partner present, and 22.6% were households with a female householder and no spouse or partner present. About 23.2% of all households were made up of individuals and 8.0% had someone living alone who was 65 years of age or older.

There were 4,057 housing units, of which 3.4% were vacant. The homeowner vacancy rate was 1.2% and the rental vacancy rate was 3.3%.

=== 2010 census ===
The 2010 United States census counted 7,626 people, 2,939 households, and 2,072 families in the borough. The population density was 6,951.6 per square mile (2,684.0/km^{2}). There were 3,051 housing units at an average density of 2,781.2 per square mile (1,073.8/km^{2}). The racial makeup was 87.23% (6,652) White, 1.43% (109) Black or African American, 0.21% (16) Native American, 7.13% (544) Asian, 0.01% (1) Pacific Islander, 2.32% (177) from other races, and 1.67% (127) from two or more races. Hispanic or Latino of any race were 13.11% (1,000) of the population.

Of the 2,939 households, 30.1% had children under the age of 18; 57.6% were married couples living together; 9.5% had a female householder with no husband present and 29.5% were non-families. Of all households, 25.4% were made up of individuals and 10.1% had someone living alone who was 65 years of age or older. The average household size was 2.59 and the average family size was 3.16.

21.5% of the population were under the age of 18, 6.8% from 18 to 24, 26.0% from 25 to 44, 31.0% from 45 to 64, and 14.7% who were 65 years of age or older. The median age was 42.4 years. For every 100 females, the population had 93.3 males. For every 100 females ages 18 and older there were 89.3 males.

The Census Bureau's 2006–2010 American Community Survey showed that (in 2010 inflation-adjusted dollars) median household income was $90,411 (with a margin of error of +/− $3,617) and the median family income was $95,972 (+/− $7,148). Males had a median income of $64,658 (+/− $7,287) versus $46,402 (+/− $6,549) for females. The per capita income for the borough was $35,360 (+/− $2,759). About 3.9% of families and 3.8% of the population were below the poverty line, including 1.8% of those under age 18 and 9.6% of those age 65 or over.

Same-sex couples headed 20 households in 2010, an increase from the 10 counted in 2000.

=== 2000 census ===
As of the 2000 United States census, there were 7,644 people, 3,024 households, and 2,137 families residing in the borough. The population density was 6,958.5 inhabitants per square mile (2,686.7/km^{2}). There were 3,087 housing units at an average density of 2,810.2 per square mile (1,085.0/km^{2}). The racial makeup of the borough was 91.01% White, 0.84% African American, 0.08% Native American, 5.02% Asian, 0.01% Pacific Islander, 1.77% from other races, and 1.27% from two or more races. Hispanic or Latino of any race were 7.27% of the population.

There were 3,024 households, out of which 29.1% had children under the age of 18 living with them, 58.9% were married couples living together, 9.0% had a female householder with no husband present, and 29.3% were non-families. 25.8% of all households were made up of individuals, and 11.2% had someone living alone who was 65 years of age or older. The average household size was 2.53 and the average family size was 3.07.

In the borough the population was spread out, with 21.2% under the age of 18, 5.3% from 18 to 24, 31.9% from 25 to 44, 24.6% from 45 to 64, and 17.0% who were 65 years of age or older. The median age was 40 years. For every 100 females, there were 90.5 males. For every 100 females age 18 and over, there were 87.2 males.

The median income for a household in the borough was $60,949, and the median income for a family was $72,500. Males had a median income of $48,309 versus $40,025 for females. The per capita income for the borough was $29,865. About 0.8% of families and 1.6% of the population were below the poverty line, including 0.6% of those under age 18 and 2.8% of those age 65 or over.

== Government ==
=== Local government ===
Wood-Ridge is governed under the borough form of New Jersey municipal government, which is used in 218 municipalities (of the 564) statewide, making it the most common form of government in New Jersey. The governing body is comprised of a mayor and a borough council, with all positions elected at-large on a partisan basis as part of the November general election. A mayor is elected directly by the voters to a four-year term of office. The borough council includes six members elected to serve three-year terms on a staggered basis, with two seats coming up for election each year in a three-year cycle. The borough form of government used by Wood-Ridge is a "weak mayor / strong council" government in which council members act as the legislative body with the mayor presiding at meetings and voting only in the event of a tie. The mayor can veto ordinances subject to an override by a two-thirds majority vote of the council. The mayor makes committee and liaison assignments for council members, and most appointments are made by the mayor with the advice and consent of the council.

As of 2026, the mayor of Wood-Ridge is Democrat Paul Sarlo, whose term of office ends December 31, 2027; Sarlo also represents the borough and district in the New Jersey Senate. Members of the Borough Council are Ezio I. Altamura (D, 2027), Dominick Azzolini (D, 2026), Michael Donato (D, 2028), Michele A. Mabel (D, 2028), Philip D. Romero (D, 2026) and Richard J. Wall (D, 2027).

In September 2012, the borough council selected Phil Romero from a list of three candidates offered by the Democratic Municipal Committee to fill the vacant seat of Cosimo "Tom" Gonnella, who had resigned from office to accept a position with the Passaic Valley Sewerage Commission after serving 16 years in office, which made him the longest-serving councilmember in borough history.

=== Federal, state and county representation ===
Wood-Ridge is located in the 9th Congressional District and is part of New Jersey's 36th state legislative district.

For the 119th United States Congress, New Jersey's 9th congressional district is represented by Nellie Pou (D, North Haledon) New Jersey is represented in the United States Senate by Democrats Cory Booker (Newark, term ends 2027) and Andy Kim (Moorestown, term ends 2031).

For the 2026–2027 session, the 36th legislative district of the New Jersey Legislature is represented in the State Senate by Paul Sarlo (D, Wood-Ridge) and in the General Assembly by Clinton Calabrese (D, Cliffside Park) and Gary Schaer (D, Passaic).

Bergen County is governed by a directly elected County Executive, with legislative functions performed by a Board of County Commissioners comprised of seven members who are elected at-large to three-year terms in partisan elections on a staggered basis, with either two or three seats coming up for election each November; a Chairman and Vice Chairman are selected from among its seven members at a reorganization meeting held every January. As of 2025, the county executive is James J. Tedesco III (D, Paramus), whose four-year term of office ends December 31, 2026.

Bergen County's Commissioners are Chair Mary J. Amoroso (D, Mahwah, 2025), Vice Chair Steven A. Tanelli (D, North Arlington, 2027), Chair Pro Tem Joan Voss (D, Fort Lee, 2026), Rafael Marte (D, Bergenfield, 2026), Germaine M. Ortiz (D, Emerson, 2025), Thomas J. Sullivan Jr. (D, Montvale, 2025) and Tracy Silna Zur (D, Franklin Lakes, 2027).

Bergen County's elected constitutional officials are Clerk John S. Hogan (D, Northvale, 2026), Sheriff Anthony Cureton (D, Englewood, 2027) and Surrogate Michael R. Dressler (D, Cresskill, 2026).

=== Politics ===
As of March 2011, there were a total of 4,764 registered voters in Wood-Ridge, of which 1,405 (29.5% vs. 31.7% countywide) were registered as Democrats, 844 (17.7% vs. 21.1%) were registered as Republicans and 2,513 (52.7% vs. 47.1%) were registered as Unaffiliated. There were 2 voters registered to other parties. Among the borough's 2010 Census population, 62.5% (vs. 57.1% in Bergen County) were registered to vote, including 79.6% of those ages 18 and over (vs. 73.7% countywide).

Gubernatorial election results for Wood-Ridge
Year	Republican		Democratic		Third party(ies)	
Year	No.	%	No.	%	No.	%
2025	2,081	49.49%	2,114	50.27%	10	0.24%
2021	1,746	52.29%	1,583	47.41%	10	0.30%
2017	1,116	43.06%	1,404	54.17%	72	2.78%
2013	1,533	57.27%	1,115	41.65%	29	1.08%
2009	1,146	52.16%	955	43.47%	96	4.37%
2005	1,088	41.13%	1,485	56.14%	72	2.72%

In the 2016 presidential election, Republican Donald Trump received 2,308 votes (50.3% vs. 41.1% countywide), ahead of Democrat Hillary Clinton with 2,120 votes (46.2% vs. 54.2%) and other candidates with 157 votes (3.4% vs. 4.6%), among the 4,632 ballots cast by the borough's 5,952 registered voters, for a turnout of 77.8% (vs. 72.5% in Bergen County). In the 2012 presidential election, Democrat Barack Obama received 2,028 votes (52.5% vs. 54.8% countywide), ahead of Republican Mitt Romney with 1,777 votes (46.0% vs. 43.5%) and other candidates with 33 votes (0.9% vs. 0.9%), among the 3,866 ballots cast by the borough's 5,085 registered voters, for a turnout of 76.0% (vs. 70.4% in Bergen County). In the 2008 presidential election, Republican John McCain received 2,073 votes (51.2% vs. 44.5% countywide), ahead of Democrat Barack Obama with 1,910 votes (47.2% vs. 53.9%) and other candidates with 32 votes (0.8% vs. 0.8%), among the 4,046 ballots cast by the borough's 5,038 registered voters, for a turnout of 80.3% (vs. 76.8% in Bergen County). In the 2004 presidential election, Republican George W. Bush received 2,073 votes (52.7% vs. 47.2% countywide), ahead of Democrat John Kerry with 1,814 votes (46.1% vs. 51.7%) and other candidates with 28 votes (0.7% vs. 0.7%), among the 3,932 ballots cast by the borough's 4,926 registered voters, for a turnout of 79.8% (vs. 76.9% in the whole county).

United States presidential election results for Wood-Ridge 2024 2020 2016 2012 2008 2004
Year	Republican		Democratic		Third party(ies)	
Year	No.	%	No.	%	No.	%
2024	2,813	53.10%	2,405	45.39%	80	1.51%
2020	2,613	46.89%	2,895	51.95%	65	1.17%
2016	2,308	50.34%	2,120	46.24%	157	3.42%
2012	1,777	46.30%	2,028	52.84%	33	0.86%
2008	2,073	51.63%	1,910	47.57%	32	0.80%
2004	2,073	52.95%	1,814	46.33%	28	0.72%

In the 2013 gubernatorial election, Republican Chris Christie received 57.3% of the vote (1,533 cast), ahead of Democrat Barbara Buono with 41.7% (1,115 votes), and other candidates with 1.1% (29 votes), among the 2,777 ballots cast by the borough's 5,098 registered voters (100 ballots were spoiled), for a turnout of 54.5%. In the 2009 gubernatorial election, Republican Chris Christie received 1,146 votes (51.6% vs. 45.8% countywide), ahead of Democrat Jon Corzine with 955 votes (43.0% vs. 48.0%), Independent Chris Daggett with 93 votes (4.2% vs. 4.7%) and other candidates with 3 votes (0.1% vs. 0.5%), among the 2,221 ballots cast by the borough's 4,263 registered voters, yielding a 52.1% turnout (vs. 50.0% in the county).

United States Senate election results for Wood-Ridge1
Year	Republican		Democratic		Third party(ies)	
Year	No.	%	No.	%	No.	%
2024	2,432	49.15%	2,419	48.89%	97	1.96%
2018	1,221	49.63%	1,189	48.33%	50	2.03%
2012	1,473	41.70%	2,004	56.74%	55	1.56%
2006	1,209	48.07%	1,260	50.10%	46	1.83%

United States Senate election results for Wood-Ridge2
Year	Republican		Democratic		Third party(ies)	
Year	No.	%	No.	%	No.	%
2020	2,410	44.36%	2,922	53.78%	101	1.86%
2014	963	42.02%	1,299	56.68%	30	1.31%
2013	670	47.89%	705	50.39%	24	1.72%
2008	1,723	47.74%	1,844	51.09%	42	1.16%

== Education ==
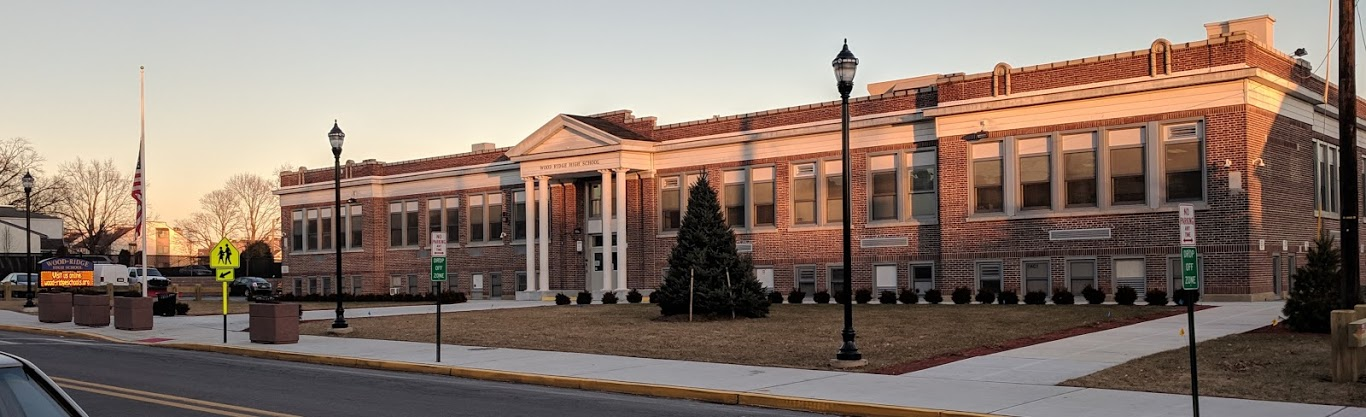
Wood-Ridge High School in February, 2019.

Students in public school for pre-kindergarten through twelfth grade attend the schools of the Wood-Ridge School District. As of the 2024–25 school year, the district, comprised of three schools, had an enrollment of 1,341 students and 105.4 classroom teachers (on an FTE basis), for a student–teacher ratio of 12.7:1. Schools in the district (with 2024–25 enrollment data from the National Center for Education Statistics) are Catherine E. Doyle Elementary School with 479 students in PreK through 3rd grade, Wood-Ridge Intermediate School with 256 students in grades 4–6 and Wood-Ridge High School with 554 students in grades 7–12.

For ninth through twelfth grades, students from Moonachie attend Wood-Ridge High School, as part of a sending/receiving relationship with the Moonachie School District.

Public school students from the borough, and all of Bergen County, are eligible to attend the secondary education programs offered by the Bergen County Technical Schools, which include the Bergen County Academies in Hackensack, and the Bergen Tech campus in Teterboro or Paramus. The district offers programs on a shared-time or full-time basis, with admission based on a selective application process and tuition covered by the student's home school district.

Our Lady of Assumption School, a Catholic school that served students in Kindergarten through 8th grade, was closed as of June 2010 by the Roman Catholic Archdiocese of Newark in the face of enrollment that had declined to 134 students in the school's final year.

== Emergency services ==
=== Police ===
The Wood-Ridge Police Department (WRPD) provides emergency and protective services to the borough of Wood-Ridge, augmented in times of emergency by the Police Auxiliary. The WRPD consists of 24 officers, led by Chief John Korin.

=== Fire ===
The Wood-Ridge Fire Department (WRFD) is an all-volunteer fire department. The WRFD was organized in 1897 and consists of one Chief and two assistant chiefs. The department is staffed by 40 fully trained firefighters. The WRFD utilizes three fire engines, a ladder truck, and a heavy rescue vehicle.

=== EMS ===
The Wood-Ridge Emergency Squad was split off of the Wood-Ridge Fire Department and established as an independent entity in April 2021.

== Transportation ==
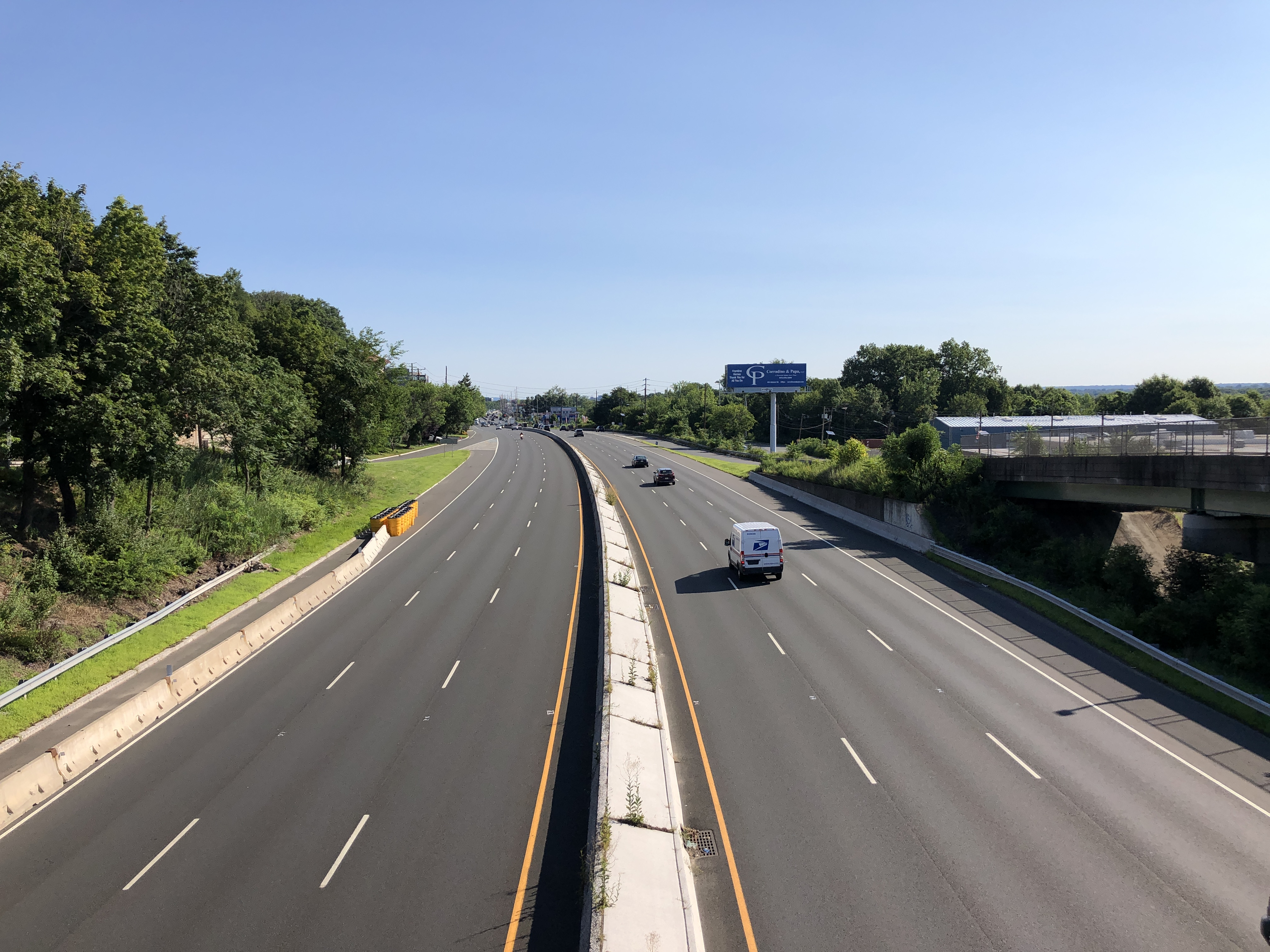
Route 17 northbound in Wood-Ridge

=== Roads and highways ===
As of May 2010, the borough had a total of 19.20 miles (30.90 km) of roadways, of which 16.25 miles (26.15 km) were maintained by the municipality, 2.30 miles (3.70 km) by Bergen County and 0.65 miles (1.05 km) by the New Jersey Department of Transportation.

Route 17 passes through Wood-Ridge.

=== Public transportation ===
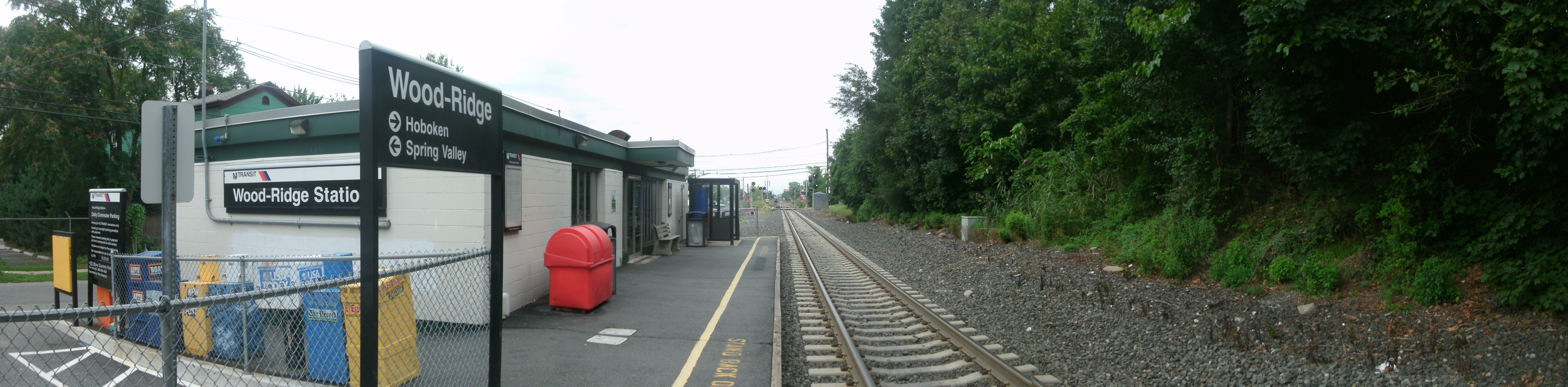
The New Jersey Transit Wood-Ridge station, facing southbound from the lone platform

Wood-Ridge is served by NJ Transit at the Wood-Ridge train station, located at Park Place East near the intersection with Route 17. The Pascack Valley Line offers service throughout the day in both directions, with service available seven days a week, operating north–south to Hoboken Terminal with connections via the Secaucus Junction transfer station to NJ Transit one-stop service to New York Penn Station and to other NJ Transit rail service. Connections are available at the Hoboken Terminal to other NJ Transit rail lines, the PATH train at the Hoboken PATH station, New York Waterways ferry service to the World Financial Center and other destinations and Hudson-Bergen Light Rail service.

The Wesmont station provides train service on the Bergen County Line to Secaucus Junction and Hoboken Terminal. The station was approved in 2008 to be constructed in Wood-Ridge. The station serves a new residential development and was opened to the public in May 2016, after years of delays.

Wood-Ridge is also served by several NJ Transit bus routes. The 76 bus runs from Hackensack along Terrace Avenue through Wood-Ridge to Newark Penn Station. The 144, 145, 148, 163 and 164 buses run from various New Jersey terminals such as Midland Park and Hackensack along Valley Boulevard through Wood-Ridge to the Port Authority Bus Terminal in Midtown Manhattan.

== Notable people ==
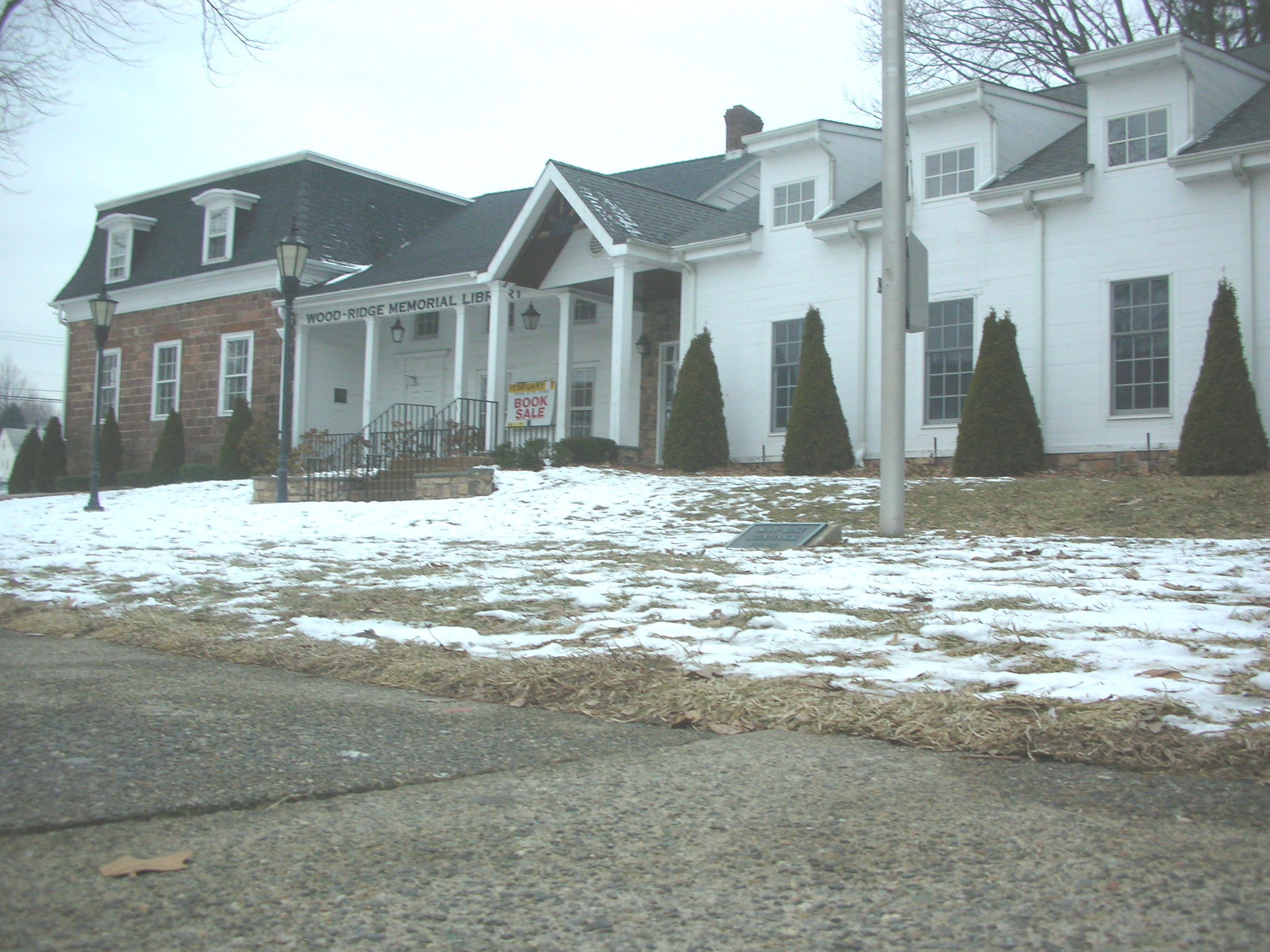
The Wood-Ridge Public Library is in the Brinkerhoff House, listed on the National Register of Historic Places.

People who were born in, residents of, or otherwise closely associated with Wood-Ridge include:

- Emanuel Ayvas (born 1983), musician best known as the lead vocalist and guitarist of symphonic rock band Emanuel and the Fear
- Alex Boniello (born 1990), actor best known for his portrayal of the Voice of Moritz in the 2015 Broadway revival of Spring Awakening
- David Brock (born 1962), Neo-Liberal political operative, author and commentator who founded the media watchdog group Media Matters for America
- Matt Brown (born 1999), professional ice hockey left winger who plays for the Bakersfield Condors
- Guy W. Calissi (1909–1980), New Jersey Superior Court judge who served as mayor of Wood-Ridge from 1947 to 1954
- Leonard T. Connors (1929–2016), politician who represented the 9th Legislative District in the New Jersey Senate from 1982 to 2008
- Dennis Diken (born 1957), co-founder and drummer for the rock band The Smithereens
- John Delaney (born 1963), U.S. Representative from Maryland's 6th congressional district from 2013 to 2019
- Bob DeMarco (born 1938), football center who played 15 seasons in the National Football League for four teams
- Frankie Muniz (born 1985), actor and professional racer, spent most of his childhood to early teen years growing up on North Avenue and being a student within the Wood-Ridge School District
- John Rowe (born 1944), former chairman and chief executive officer of Aetna
- Paul Sarlo (born 1968), State Senator and Mayor of Wood-Ridge
- Bob Sullivan (born 1968), financial journalist and author

== Sources ==
- Municipal Incorporations of the State of New Jersey (according to Counties) prepared by the Division of Local Government, Department of the Treasury (New Jersey); December 1, 1958.
- Clayton, W. Woodford; and Nelson, William. History of Bergen and Passaic Counties, New Jersey, with Biographical Sketches of Many of its Pioneers and Prominent Men., Philadelphia: Everts and Peck, 1882.
- Harvey, Cornelius Burnham (ed.), Genealogical History of Hudson and Bergen Counties, New Jersey. New York: New Jersey Genealogical Publishing Co., 1900.
- Sloan, Patricia Helbig; Cassidy, Catherine. Wood-Ridge: Images of America, Arcadia Publishing, 2004. ISBN 9780738535562
- Van Valen, James M. History of Bergen County, New Jersey. New York: New Jersey Publishing and Engraving Co., 1900.
- Westervelt, Frances A. (Frances Augusta), 1858–1942, History of Bergen County, New Jersey, 1630–1923, Lewis Historical Publishing Company, 1923.
