= South Hackensack, New Jersey =

Township in Bergen County, New Jersey, US

- Township
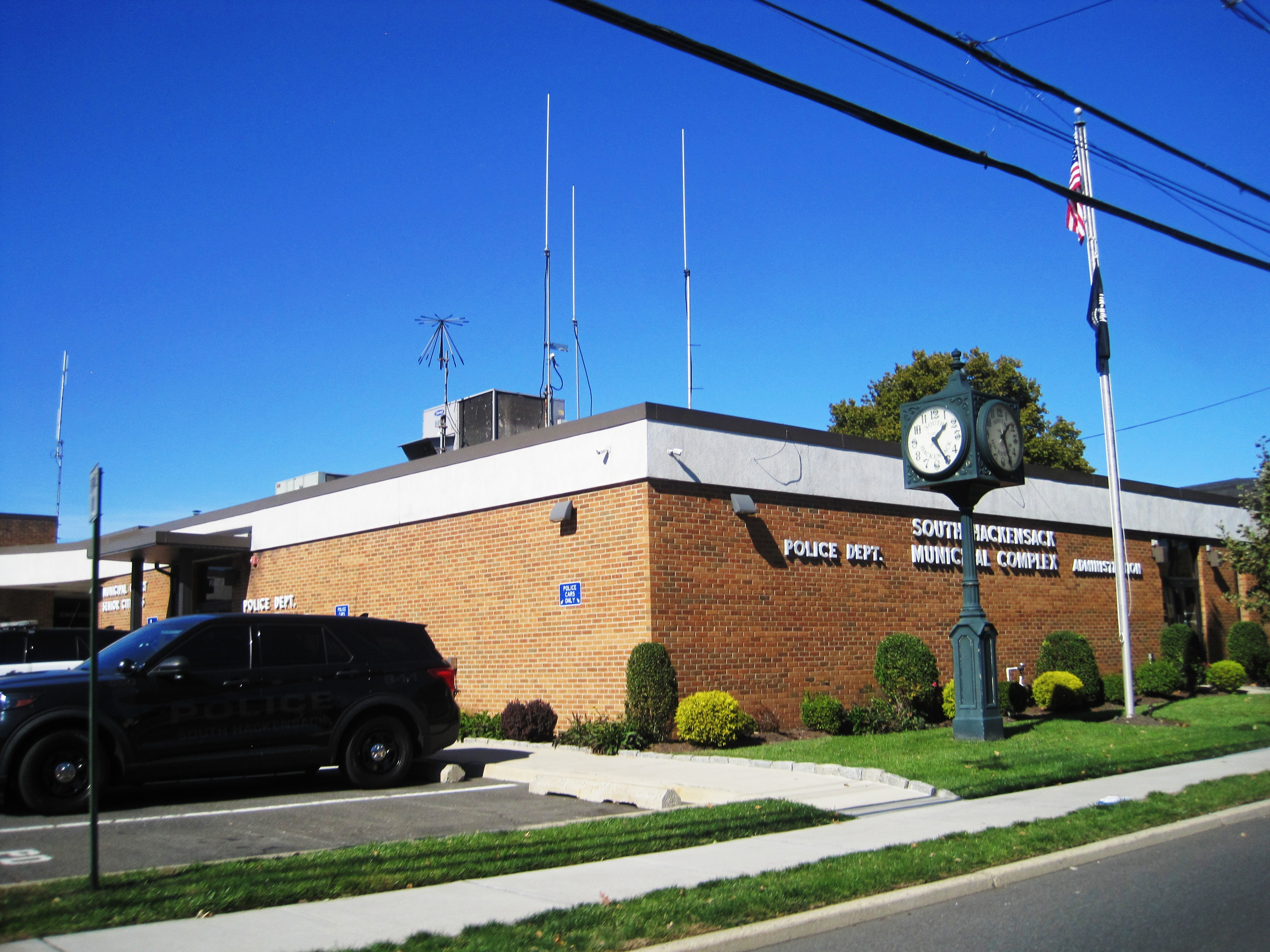
- South Hackensack Municipal Complex
- Nickname: "Bergen County's Original Small Town"
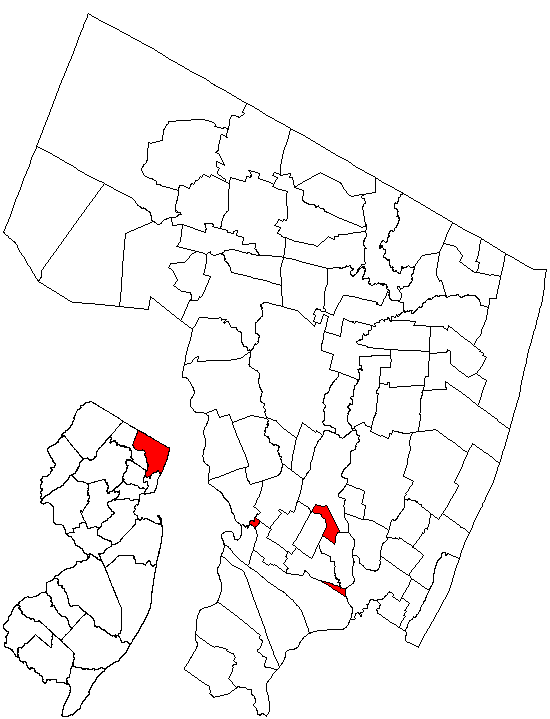
- Location of South Hackensack in Bergen County highlighted in red (right). Inset map: Location of Bergen County in New Jersey highlighted in red (left).

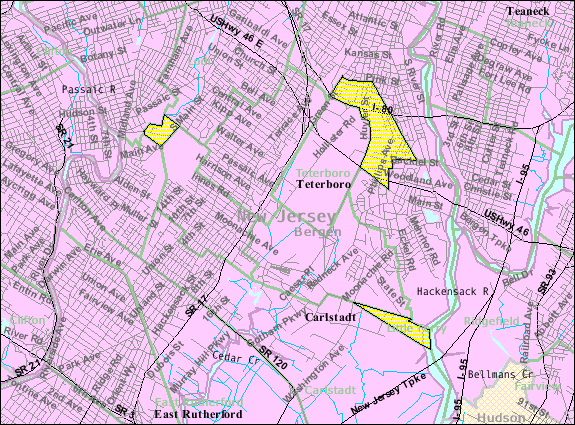
- Census Bureau map of South Hackensack, New Jersey

- Location in Bergen County Location in New Jersey Location in the United States
- Coordinates: 40.864801°N 74.048115°W
- Country: United States
- State: New Jersey
- County: Bergen
- Incorporated: November 5, 1935

Government
  - Type: Township
  - Body: Township Committee
  - Mayor: James Anzevino (D, term ends December 31, 2025)
  - Municipal clerk: Donna Gambutti

Area
  - Total: 0.75 sq mi (1.94 km^{2})
  - Land: 0.72 sq mi (1.86 km^{2})
  - Water: 0.031 sq mi (0.08 km^{2}) 4.27%
  - Rank: 525th of 565 in state 70th of 70 in county
- Elevation: 13 ft (4.0 m)

Population (2020)
  - Total: 2,701
  - Estimate (2023): 2,700
  - Rank: 460th of 565 in state 67th of 70 in county
  - Density: 3,768.5/sq mi (1,455.0/km^{2})
  - Rank: 175th of 565 in state 37th of 70 in county
- Time zone: UTC−05:00 (Eastern (EST))
  - Summer (DST): UTC−04:00 (Eastern (EDT))
- ZIP Code: 07606
- Area code: 201
- FIPS code: 3400368970
- GNIS feature ID: 0882226
- Website: www.southhackensacknj.org

South Hackensack is a township in Bergen County, in the U.S. state of New Jersey. As of the 2020 United States census, the township's population was 2,701, an increase of 323 (+13.6%) from the 2010 census count of 2,378, which in turn reflected an increase of 129 (+5.7%) from the 2,249 counted in the 2000 census.

== History ==
South Hackensack was formed as a township by an act of the New Jersey Legislature on November 15, 1935, replacing Lodi Township, based on the results of a referendum held November 5, 1935, which passed by a margin of 309 to 15. The township's name derives from its location relative to Hackensack.

The territory that became South Hackensack was the "last unattractive portion" of Lodi Township that neighboring municipalities didn't want as it was "either rural areas or areas that the others did not want to include in their boundaries because they didn't want to pave the roads there or school the children" according to Kevin Wright, a local historian. The state government has occasionally proposed the merger of South Hackesack into its neighboring municipalities, however, there is very little desire for such a merger within the township's residents.

== Geography ==
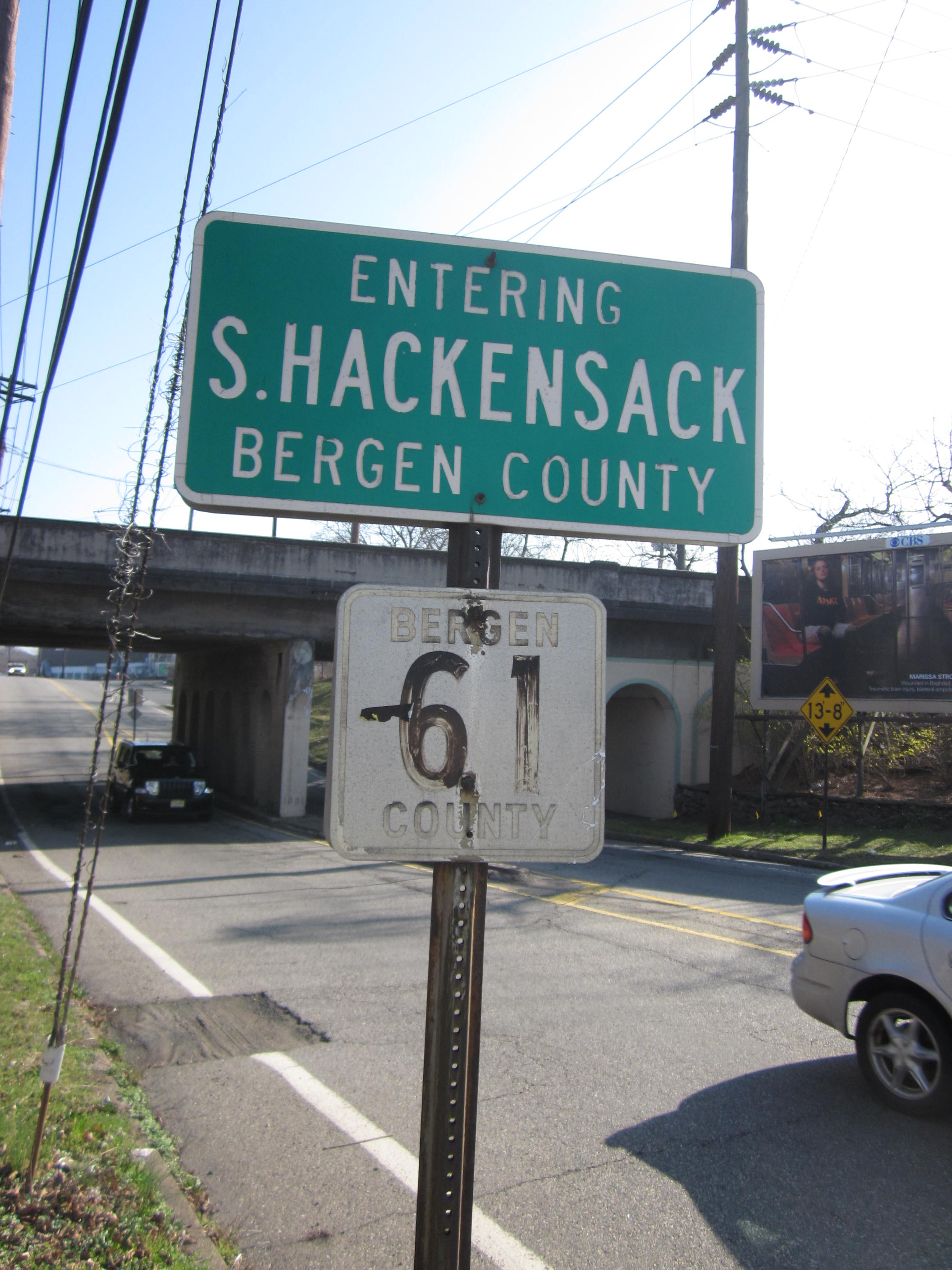
Entering the western exclave from Wallington along CR 61 (Main Street) eastbound

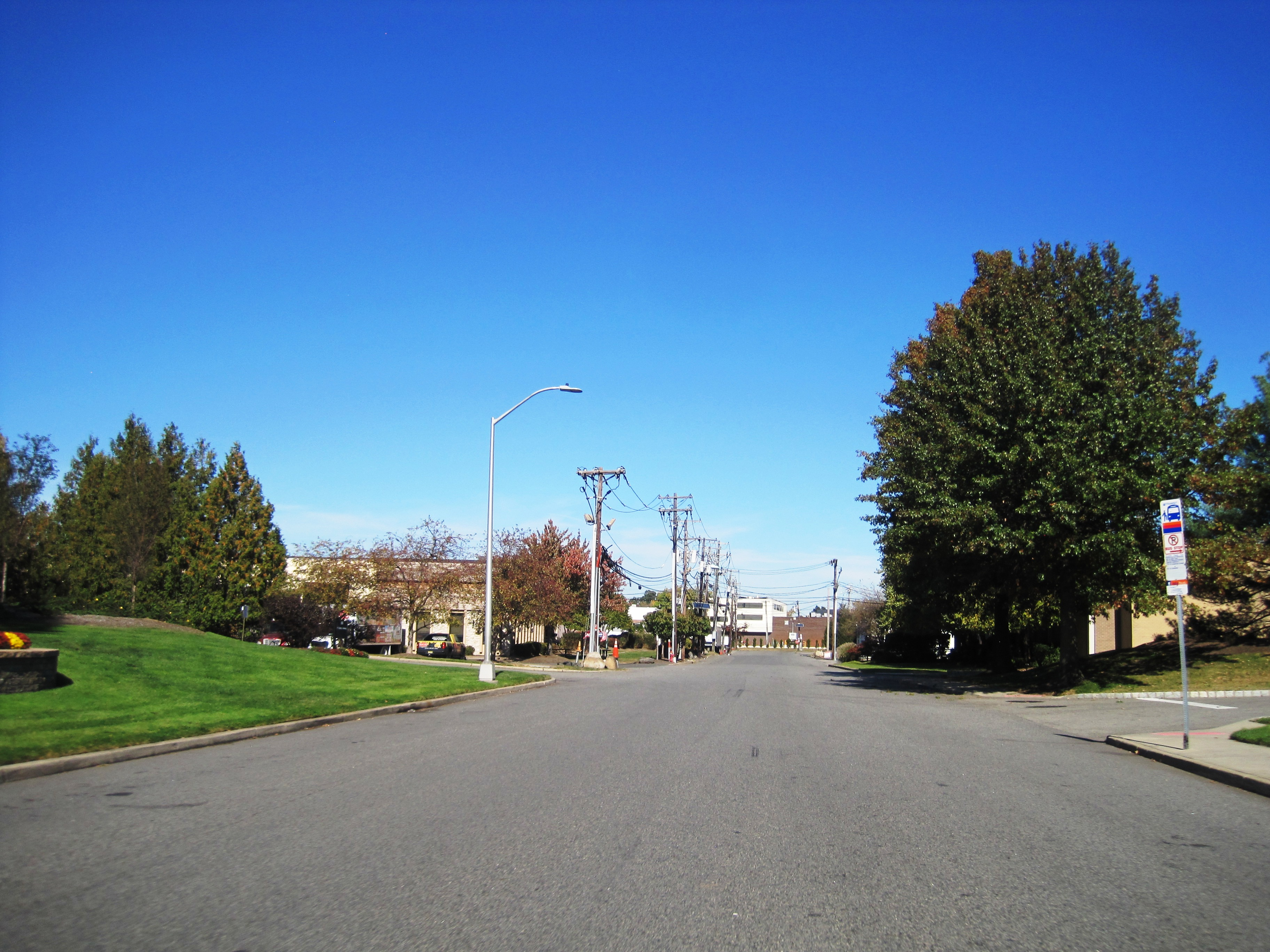
Entering the southeastern exclave from Carlstadt along Central Boulevard northbound

According to the United States Census Bureau, the township had a total area of 0.75 square miles (1.94 km^{2}), including 0.72 square miles (1.86 km^{2}) of land and 0.03 square miles (0.08 km^{2}) of water (4.27%).

After several boroughs were formed within the limits of Lodi Township, what remains as South Hackensack is divided into three noncontiguous sections. The northeastern, primary residential section is adjacent to Hackensack, Little Ferry and Teterboro. A small western portion, known as Garfield Park, lies in between Garfield, Lodi, Wallington and Wood-Ridge, while a southern sliver containing only industrial properties lies in the Meadowlands between Carlstadt, Moonachie, and Ridgefield.

Along with other municipalities in the Bergen County area, South Hackensack is a suburb of New York City.

== Demographics ==
Historical population
Census	Pop.	Note	%±
1900	229		—
1910	693		202.6%
1920	987		42.4%
1930	1,294		31.1%
1940	1,241		−4.1%
1950	1,503		21.1%
1960	1,841		22.5%
1970	2,412		31.0%
1980	2,229		−7.6%
1990	2,106		−5.5%
2000	2,249		6.8%
2010	2,378		5.7%
2020	2,701		13.6%
2023 (est.)	2,700		0.0%
Population sources: 1910–1920; 1910–1930 1900–2020; 2000 2010 2020

=== 2020 census ===
South Hackensack township, Bergen County, New Jersey – Racial and ethnic composition Note: the US Census treats Hispanic/Latino as an ethnic category. This table excludes Latinos from the racial categories and assigns them to a separate category. Hispanics/Latinos may be of any race.
Race / Ethnicity (NH = Non-Hispanic)	Pop 2000	Pop 2010	Pop 2020	% 2000	% 2010	% 2020
White alone (NH)	1,698	1,326	1,068	75.50%	55.76%	39.54%
Black or African American alone (NH)	47	98	135	2.09%	4.12%	5.00%
Native American or Alaska Native alone (NH)	5	4	1	0.22%	0.17%	0.04%
Asian alone (NH)	129	121	172	5.74%	5.09%	6.37%
Native Hawaiian or Pacific Islander alone (NH)	3	0	1	0.13%	0.00%	0.04%
Other race alone (NH)	2	2	17	0.09%	0.08%	0.63%
Mixed race or Multiracial (NH)	26	35	51	1.16%	1.47%	1.89%
Hispanic or Latino (any race)	339	792	1,256	15.07%	33.31%	46.50%
Total	2,249	2,378	2,701	100.00%	100.00%	100.00%

=== 2010 census ===
The 2010 United States census counted 2,378 people, 845 households, and 613 families in the township. The population density was 3,311.7 per square mile (1,278.7/km^{2}). There were 879 housing units at an average density of 1,224.1 per square mile (472.6/km^{2}). The racial makeup was 72.08% (1,714) White, 5.34% (127) Black or African American, 0.34% (8) Native American, 5.30% (126) Asian, 0.00% (0) Pacific Islander, 14.05% (334) from other races, and 2.90% (69) from two or more races. Hispanic or Latino of any race were 33.31% (792) of the population.

Of the 845 households, 32.3% had children under the age of 18; 49.0% were married couples living together; 16.4% had a female householder with no husband present and 27.5% were non-families. Of all households, 21.8% were made up of individuals and 10.8% had someone living alone who was 65 years of age or older. The average household size was 2.81 and the average family size was 3.28.

22.0% of the population were under the age of 18, 7.9% from 18 to 24, 28.6% from 25 to 44, 25.6% from 45 to 64, and 15.9% who were 65 years of age or older. The median age was 39.6 years. For every 100 females, the population had 95.4 males. For every 100 females ages 18 and older there were 93.5 males.

The Census Bureau's 2006–2010 American Community Survey showed that (in 2010 inflation-adjusted dollars) median household income was $70,500 (with a margin of error of +/− $9,389) and the median family income was $81,919 (+/− $8,497). Males had a median income of $55,250 (+/− $13,321) versus $33,472 (+/− $11,009) for females. The per capita income for the borough was $30,777 (+/− $2,660). About 3.4% of families and 6.0% of the population were below the poverty line, including 5.7% of those under age 18 and 1.6% of those age 65 or over.

Same-sex couples headed 5 households in 2010, an increase from the 4 counted in 2000.

=== 2000 census ===
As of the 2000 United States census there were 2,249 people, 811 households, and 593 families residing in the township. The population density was 3,161.2 inhabitants per square mile (1,220.5/km^{2}). There were 830 housing units at an average density of 1,166.6 per square mile (450.4/km^{2}). The racial makeup of the township was 82.93% White, 2.18% African American, 0.22% Native American, 5.74% Asian, 0.31% Pacific Islander, 6.31% from other races, and 2.31% from two or more races. Hispanic or Latino of any race were 15.07% of the population.

As of the 2000 Census, 36.3% of township residents were of Italian ancestry, the 11th-highest percentage of any municipality in the United States, and fourth-highest in New Jersey, among all places with more than 1,000 residents identifying their ancestry.

There were 811 households, out of which 27.7% had children under the age of 18 living with them, 54.7% were married couples living together, 13.1% had a female householder with no husband present, and 26.8% were non-families. 23.1% of all households were made up of individuals, and 9.7% had someone living alone who was 65 years of age or older. The average household size was 2.77 and the average family size was 3.27.

In the township the population was spread out, with 19.7% under the age of 18, 8.8% from 18 to 24, 31.4% from 25 to 44, 23.7% from 45 to 64, and 16.5% who were 65 years of age or older. The median age was 38 years. For every 100 females, there were 92.7 males. For every 100 females age 18 and over, there were 90.6 males.

The median income for a household in the township was $57,917, and the median income for a family was $66,071. Males had a median income of $39,918 versus $32,344 for females. The per capita income for the township was $27,128. About 5.2% of families and 7.1% of the population were below the poverty line, including 8.5% of those under age 18 and 6.2% of those age 65 or over.

== Government ==
=== Local government ===
South Hackensack is governed under the Township form of New Jersey municipal government, one of 141 municipalities (of the 564) statewide that use this form, the second-most commonly used form of government in the state. The Township Committee has five members, who are elected directly by the voters at-large in partisan elections to serve three-year terms of office on a staggered basis, with either one or two seats coming up for election each year as part of the November general election in a three-year cycle. At an annual reorganization meeting, the Township Committee selects one of its members to serve as Mayor and another as Deputy Mayor. The Township Committee is composed entirely of residents from the main section of the township, although Garfield Park residents are active in the zoning and planning boards. While South Hackensack has its own police department serving all three portions of the township, the neighboring borough of Wallington provides other emergency services for Garfield Park.

As of 2025, members of the Township Committee are Mayor James Anzevino (D, term on committee ends December 31, 2026; term as mayor ends 2025), Deputy Luis Perdono (D, term on committee and as deputy mayor ends 2026), James Gary Brugger (D, 2027), Frank X. Cagas (D, 2027), and Yris Encarnacion (D, 2025).

=== Federal, state and county representation ===
South Hackensack is located in the 9th Congressional District and is part of New Jersey's 38th state legislative district.

For the 119th United States Congress, New Jersey's 9th congressional district is represented by Nellie Pou (D, North Haledon) New Jersey is represented in the United States Senate by Democrats Cory Booker (Newark, term ends 2027) and Andy Kim (Moorestown, term ends 2031).

For the 2026–2027 session, the 38th legislative district of the New Jersey Legislature is represented in the State Senate by Joseph Lagana (D, Paramus) and in the General Assembly by Lisa Swain (D, Fair Lawn) and Chris Tully (D, Bergenfield).

Bergen County is governed by a directly elected County Executive, with legislative functions performed by a Board of County Commissioners comprised of seven members who are elected at-large to three-year terms in partisan elections on a staggered basis, with either two or three seats coming up for election each November; a Chairman and Vice Chairman are selected from among its seven members at a reorganization meeting held every January. As of 2025, the county executive is James J. Tedesco III (D, Paramus), whose four-year term of office ends December 31, 2026.

Bergen County's Commissioners are Chair Mary J. Amoroso (D, Mahwah, 2025), Vice Chair Steven A. Tanelli (D, North Arlington, 2027), Chair Pro Tem Joan Voss (D, Fort Lee, 2026), Rafael Marte (D, Bergenfield, 2026), Germaine M. Ortiz (D, Emerson, 2025), Thomas J. Sullivan Jr. (D, Montvale, 2025) and Tracy Silna Zur (D, Franklin Lakes, 2027).

Bergen County's elected constitutional officials are Clerk John S. Hogan (D, Northvale, 2026), Sheriff Anthony Cureton (D, Englewood, 2027) and Surrogate Michael R. Dressler (D, Cresskill, 2026).

=== Politics ===
United States presidential election results for South Hackensack 2024 2020 2016 2012 2008 2004
Year	Republican		Democratic		Third party(ies)	
Year	No.	%	No.	%	No.	%
2024	541	57.43%	381	40.45%	20	2.12%
2020	487	45.30%	575	53.49%	13	1.21%
2016	473	44.50%	565	53.15%	25	2.35%
2012	389	40.90%	551	57.94%	11	1.16%
2008	512	48.08%	541	50.80%	12	1.13%
2004	499	50.30%	485	48.89%	8	0.81%

As of March 2011, there were a total of 1,300 registered voters in South Hackensack Township, of which 302 (23.2% vs. 31.7% countywide) were registered as Democrats, 309 (23.8% vs. 21.1%) were registered as Republicans and 688 (52.9% vs. 47.1%) were registered as Unaffiliated. There was one voter registered to another party. Among the township's 2010 Census population, 54.7% (vs. 57.1% in Bergen County) were registered to vote, including 70.0% of those ages 18 and over (vs. 73.7% countywide).

In the 2016 presidential election, Democrat Hillary Clinton received 565 votes (53.0% vs. 54.2% countywide), ahead of Republican Donald Trump with 473 votes (44.3% vs. 41.1%) and other candidates with 29 votes (2.7% vs. 4.6%), among the 1,094 ballots cast by the township's 1,484 registered voters, for a turnout of 73.7% (vs. 72.5% in Bergen County). In the 2012 presidential election, Democrat Barack Obama received 551 votes (57.2% vs. 54.8% countywide), ahead of Republican Mitt Romney with 389 votes (40.4% vs. 43.5%) and other candidates with 11 votes (1.1% vs. 0.9%), among the 963 ballots cast by the township's 1,368 registered voters, for a turnout of 70.4% (vs. 70.4% in Bergen County). In the 2008 presidential election, Democrat Barack Obama received 541 votes (50.1% vs. 53.9% countywide), ahead of Republican John McCain with 512 votes (47.5% vs. 44.5%) and other candidates with 12 votes (1.1% vs. 0.8%), among the 1,079 ballots cast by the township's 1,385 registered voters, for a turnout of 77.9% (vs. 76.8% in Bergen County). In the 2004 presidential election, Republican George W. Bush received 499 votes (49.9% vs. 47.2% countywide), ahead of Democrat John Kerry with 485 votes (48.5% vs. 51.7%) and other candidates with 8 votes (0.8% vs. 0.7%), among the 999 ballots cast by the township's 1,377 registered voters, for a turnout of 72.5% (vs. 76.9% in the whole county).

Gubernatorial election results for South Hackensack
Year	Republican		Democratic		Third party(ies)	
Year	No.	%	No.	%	No.	%
2025	313	45.10%	377	54.32%	4	0.58%
2021	277	50.92%	264	48.53%	3	0.55%
2017	179	35.10%	324	63.53%	7	1.37%
2013	355	56.17%	238	37.66%	39	6.17%
2009	333	47.50%	329	46.93%	39	5.56%
2005	332	43.57%	417	54.72%	13	1.71%

In the 2013 gubernatorial election, Republican Chris Christie received 56.2% of the vote (355 cast), ahead of Democrat Barbara Buono with 37.7% (238 votes), and other candidates with 6.2% (39 votes), among the 653 ballots cast by the township's 1,343 registered voters (21 ballots were spoiled), for a turnout of 48.6%. In the 2009 gubernatorial election, Republican Chris Christie received 333 votes (43.6% vs. 45.8% countywide), ahead of Democrat Jon Corzine with 329 votes (43.1% vs. 48.0%), Independent Chris Daggett with 34 votes (4.5% vs. 4.7%) and other candidates with 5 votes (0.7% vs. 0.5%), among the 763 ballots cast by the township's 1,351 registered voters, yielding a 56.5% turnout (vs. 50.0% in the county).

United States Senate election results for South Hackensack1
Year	Republican		Democratic		Third party(ies)	
Year	No.	%	No.	%	No.	%
2024	428	51.75%	374	45.22%	25	3.02%
2018	265	39.20%	400	59.17%	11	1.63%
2012	302	37.33%	496	61.31%	11	1.36%
2006	368	50.69%	343	47.25%	15	2.07%

United States Senate election results for South Hackensack2
Year	Republican		Democratic		Third party(ies)	
Year	No.	%	No.	%	No.	%
2020	423	41.15%	577	56.13%	28	2.72%
2014	250	40.92%	353	57.77%	8	1.31%
2013	148	56.49%	112	42.75%	2	0.76%
2008	371	41.45%	513	57.32%	11	1.23%

== Education ==
Public school students in pre-kindergarten through eighth grade are served by the South Hackensack School District at Memorial School. As of the 2023–24 school year, the district, comprised of one school, had an enrollment of 265 students and 24.5 classroom teachers (on an FTE basis), for a student–teacher ratio of 10.8:1.

Students in public school for ninth through twelfth grades attend Hackensack High School as part of a sending/receiving relationship with the Hackensack Public Schools, together with students from Rochelle Park. As of the 2023–24 school year, the high school had an enrollment of 1,726 students and 138.3 classroom teachers (on an FTE basis), for a student–teacher ratio of 12.5:1.

Public school students from the borough, and all of Bergen County, are eligible to attend the secondary education programs offered by the Bergen County Technical Schools, which include the Bergen County Academies in Hackensack, and the Bergen Tech campus in Teterboro or Paramus. The district offers programs on a shared-time or full-time basis, with admission based on a selective application process and tuition covered by the student's home school district.

== Transportation ==
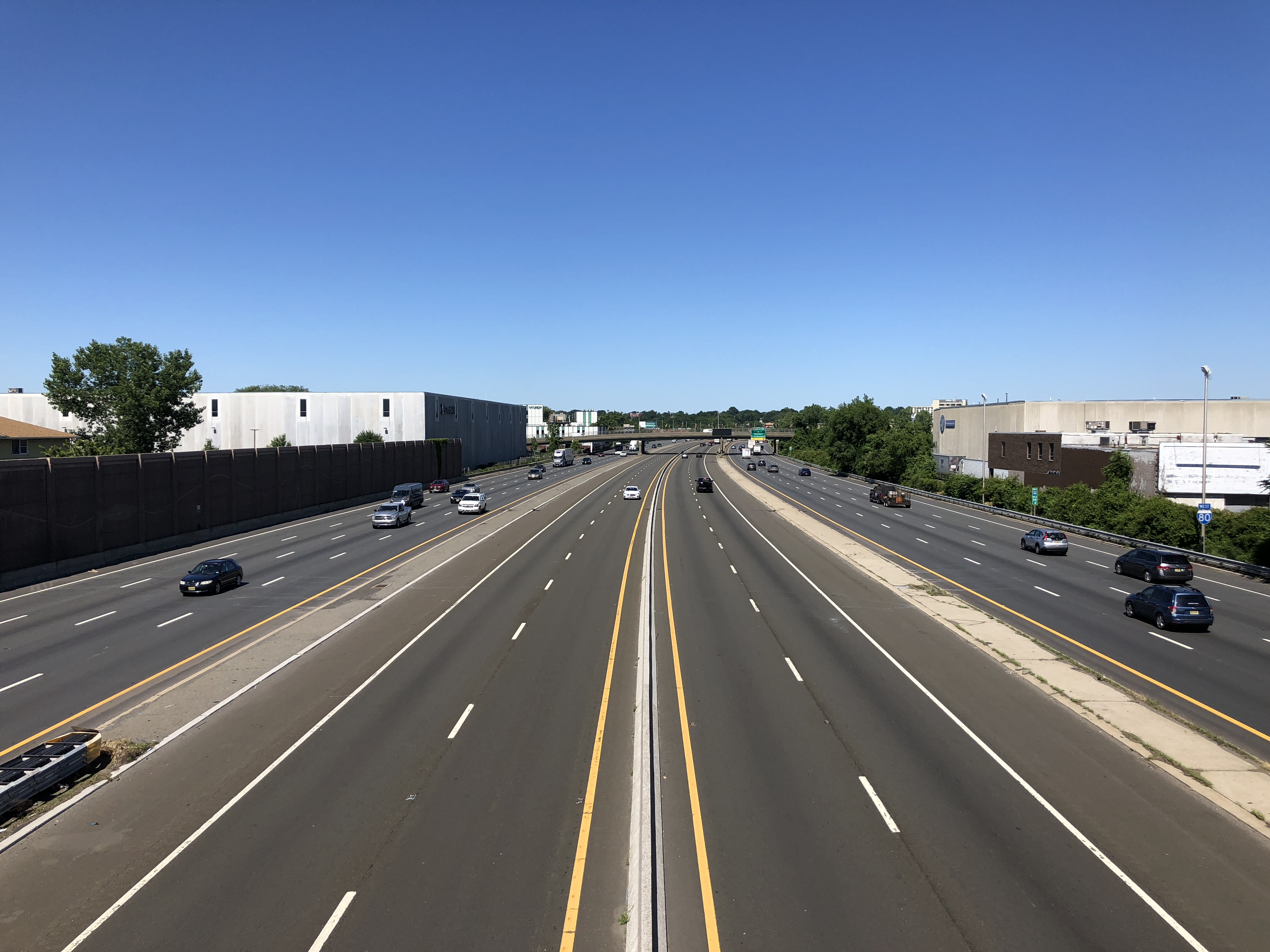
Interstate 80 westbound in South Hackensack

=== Roads and highways ===
As of May 2010, the township had a total of 11.16 miles (17.96 km) of roadways, of which 8.57 miles (13.79 km) were maintained by the municipality, 1.60 miles (2.57 km) by Bergen County and 0.99 miles (1.59 km) by the New Jersey Department of Transportation.

Interstate 80 crosses the main portion of the township, while U.S. Route 46 skirts its southern border and County Route 503 goes along its eastern border.

=== Public transportation ===
NJ Transit provides bus service between the township and the Port Authority Bus Terminal in Midtown Manhattan on the 161 and 165 routes, to Newark on the 76 route, with local service offered on the 772 route.

== Sources ==
- Municipal Incorporations of the State of New Jersey (according to Counties) prepared by the Division of Local Government, Department of the Treasury (New Jersey); December 1, 1958.
- Clayton, W. Woodford; and Nelson, William. History of Bergen and Passaic Counties, New Jersey, with Biographical Sketches of Many of its Pioneers and Prominent Men. Philadelphia: Everts and Peck, 1882.
- Harvey, Cornelius Burnham (ed.), Genealogical History of Hudson and Bergen Counties, New Jersey. New York: New Jersey Genealogical Publishing Co., 1900.
- Van Valen, James M. History of Bergen County, New Jersey. New York: New Jersey Publishing and Engraving Co., 1900.
- Westervelt, Frances A. (Frances Augusta), 1858–1942, History of Bergen County, New Jersey, 1630–1923, Lewis Historical Publishing Company, 1923.
