= New Jersey Department of Human Services =

State agency of New Jersey, United States

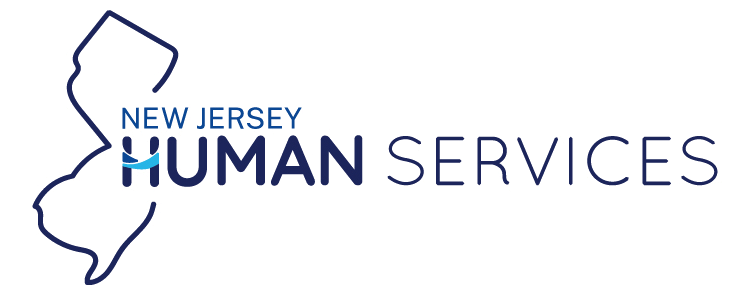
- Logo of the NJDHS

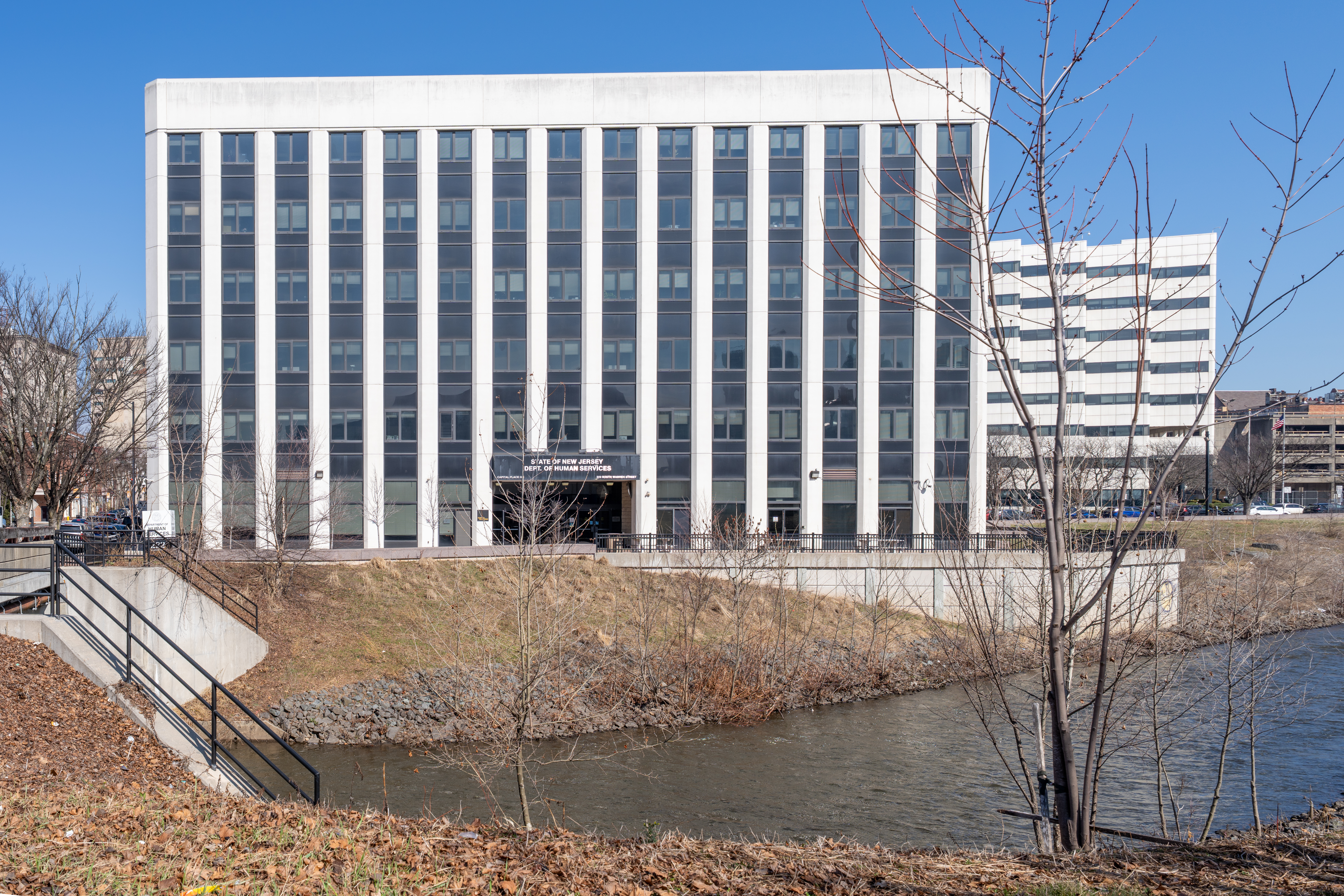
- Headquarters of the NJDHS in Trenton

Department overview
- Formed: February 28, 1918; 108 years ago (as Department of Charities and Corrections)
- Jurisdiction: Government of New Jersey
- Headquarters: 222 South Warren Street, Trenton, New Jersey
- Annual budget: US$32.2 billion (FY2027) (65% federal)
- Department executive: Dr. Stephen Cha, Commissioner
- Website: https://www.nj.gov/humanservices/index.shtml

The New Jersey Department of Human Services (NJDHS) is the largest state government agency in New Jersey, serving about 1.5 million New Jerseyans. DHS serves seniors, individuals and families with low incomes; people with developmental disabilities, or late-onset disabilities; people who are blind, visually impaired, deaf, hard of hearing, or deaf-blind; parents needing child care services, child support and/or healthcare for their children; and families facing catastrophic medical expenses for their children.

There is a New Jersey Department of Human Services Police, which is responsible for patrolling, responding and reporting any crimes against people or property within the several psychiatric hospitals and developmental centers in New Jersey. Such facilities include Greystone Park Psychiatric Hospital, New Jersey State Hospital at Trenton and Ancora Psychiatric Hospital. It also assists the Division of Child Protection and Permanency.

== Divisions ==
DHS consists of nine major divisions:

- Commission for the Blind & Visually Impaired (CBVI)
- Division of Aging Services (DoAS)
- Division of the Deaf and Hard of Hearing (DDHH)
- Division of Developmental Disabilities (DDD)
- Division of Disability Services (DDS)
- Division of Family Development (DFD)
- Division of Medical Assistance & Health Services (DMAHS)
- Division of Mental Health and Addiction Services (DMHAS)
- Office of New Americans

Allocated within DHS and operate administratively as units within it but are directed by a governing body:

- Catastrophic Illness in Children Relief Fund (CICRF)
- Office on Autism
- Office for the Prevention of Developmental Disabilities (OPDD)

Offices performing administrative functions:

- Office of Legal Affairs (OLA)
- Office of Program Integrity and Accountability (OPIA)
- Office of Licensing (OOL)
- Office of Contract Policy and Management (OCPM)
- Office of Information Systems (OIS)

== Related legislation ==
- 1918: Act of February 28, 1918, P.L. 1918, c. 147
- 1919: Act of April 11, 1919, P.L. 1919, c. 97
- 1948: Act of May 28, 1948, P.L. 1948, c. 87
- 1976: Department of Corrections Act of 1976, P.L. 1976, c. 98
- 2012: Act of June 29, 2012, P.L. 2012, c. 17

== See also ==
- Supplemental Nutrition Assistance Program
- Governorship of Chris Christie
- Governorship of Phil Murphy
