= 1979 in art =

Events from the year 1979 in art.

== Events ==
- 25 October – Frederic Edwin Church's 1861 painting The Icebergs sells for US$2.5 million at Sotheby's New York, the third-highest amount paid for any painting at auction at this date.
- 15 November – Art historian and former Surveyor of the Queen's Pictures Anthony Blunt's role as one of the 'Cambridge Five' double agents for the Soviet NKVD during World War II is revealed by Prime Minister Margaret Thatcher in the House of Commons of the United Kingdom.
- unknown date
  - The Xing xing ("The Stars Group") of 20 avant-garde Chinese artists (including Ma Desheng, Wang Keping, Huang Rui, Li Shuang, Qu Leilei, Ah Cheng and Ai Weiwei) stage an illegal exhibition outside the National Art Museum of China in Beijing.
  - The Bauhaus Archive, designed by Alexander Cvijanović with Hans Bandel after Walter Gropius, is completed in West Berlin, Germany.

== Awards ==
- Archibald Prize: Wes Walters – Portrait of Phillip Adams

== Works ==
- Michael Andrews – Melanie and Me Swimming
- Judy Chicago – The Dinner Party (collaborative installation, completed)
- Jenny Holzer – Truisms
- Lee Kelly – sculptures (Portland, Oregon)
  - Elkhorn
  - Nash
- Jack Mackie and Charles Greening – Dancer's Series: Steps (bronze, Seattle)
- Joan Mitchell
  - La Vie en Rose
  - Salut Tom
- Andrzej Pitynski – The Partisans (aluminum sculpture)
- Enzo Plazzotta – Attitude II (Margot Fonteyn)
- John Rogers – 118 Modules (sculpture, Portland, Oregon)
- Michael Snow – Flight Stop (sculpture, Toronto Eaton Centre)
- Don Wilson – Holon (sculpture, Portland, Oregon)

== Exhibitions ==
- 22 April to 10 June – Special Projects (Scott Belville. John Boone. Andrea Callard. Katherine Carter. Ian Crofts, Lauren Ewing, Heide Fasnicht, Betty Goodwin, Norman Hasselriis, Alan Herman, Jeff (Jeff Russell), and Elaine Reichek) at PS1 in Queens, New York.

== Births ==
- 25 July – Ahmed Mater, Saudi artist
- date unknown
  - Aideen Barry, Irish multimedia and performance artist
  - Éric Bourdon, French painter and writer
  - Elise Fouin, French designer

== Deaths ==
- 11 January – Daniel-Henry Kahnweiler, German-born French Art dealer (born 1884)
- 3 February – Aaron Douglas, American painter (born 1898)
- 7 February – Charles Tunnicliffe, British wildlife painter (born 1901)
- 20 March – Jean Charlot, French painter and illustrator (born 1898)
- 5 April – Eugène Gabritschevsky, Russian biologist and artist (born 1893)
- 23 June – Reynolds Stone, English wood engraver (born 1909)
- 25 June
  - Dave Fleischer, Austrian American animator, film director, and film producer (born 1894)
  - Philippe Halsman, Latvian American portrait photographer (born 1906)
- 13 July – Ludwig Merwart, Austrian painter and graphic artist (born 1913)
- 20 August – Christian Dotremont, Belgian painter and poet (born 1922)
- 29 August – Ivon Hitchens, English painter (born 1893)
- 17 September – Paul Maze, French-born English Post-Impressionist painter (born 1887)
- 8 November – Edward Ardizzone, British writer and illustrator (born 1900)
- 20 November – Tyra Lundgren, Swedish painter, ceramist, glass and textile designer and writer on art (born 1897)
- 5 December – Sonia Delaunay, Ukrainian-French artist (born 1885)
- 23 December – Peggy Guggenheim, American-born art collector (born 1898)
- date unknown
  - Russell Brockbank, Canadian-born cartoonist (born 1913)
  - Sheila Fell, English painter (born 1931)

== See also ==
- 1979 in fine arts of the Soviet Union
