= 1979 in architecture =

The year 1979 in architecture involved some significant architectural events and new buildings.

== Buildings and structures ==
=== Buildings opened ===
- March – Kuwait Towers opens in Kuwait City with a Viewing Sphere which completes a full turn every 30 minutes.
- August 32 – Vienna International Centre, for the United Nations Office at Vienna.
- September 2 – Prabhupada's Palace of Gold is dedicated in Marshall County, West Virginia, USA, as a memorial shrine built by Hare Krishna devotees.
- September 3 – National Theater of Cuba, Havana; construction of the building began in 1951.
- October 10 – The Atheneum, designed by Richard Meier, opens as a visitor center in New Harmony, Indiana.

=== Buildings completed ===
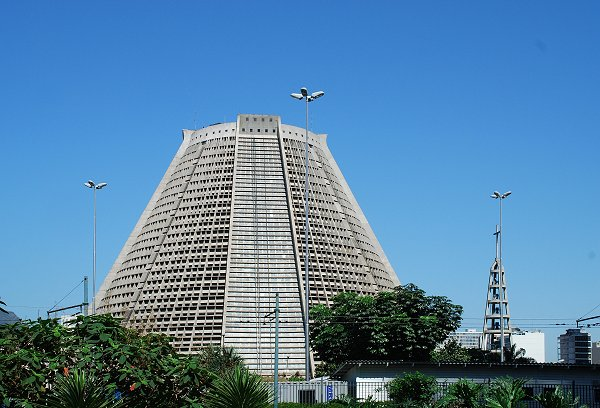
The Rio de Janeiro Cathedral, Brazil

- Brønnøysund Bridge, Norway.
- Parque Central Complex, Caracas, Venezuela, the tallest building in South America.
- The Tower of Europe in Frankfurt am Main, Germany.
- Rio de Janeiro Cathedral (Catedral Metropolitana do Rio de Janeiro), with 64 meter (210 ft) tall stained glass windows.
- Hedmark Museum, Hamar, Norway, designed by Sverre Fehn.
- Bauhaus Archive, West Berlin, Germany, designed by Alexander Cvijanović with Hans Bandel after Walter Gropius.
- "Stars" housing estate, Katowice, Poland.

== Events ==
- December: The Thirties Society (now the Twentieth Century Society) established in the United Kingdom as an architectural conservation pressure group.
- Pritzker Prize instituted by Jay A. Pritzker.
- Construction begins at the Jacob K. Javits Convention Center designed by I. M. Pei.
- Xanadu House design started.
- Construction of the 360 foot (110 m) communications mast atop the North Tower (1WTC) of the World Trade Center is completed.

== Awards ==
- American Academy of Arts and Letters Gold Medal – I. M. Pei.
- AIA Gold Medal – I. M. Pei.
- Architecture Firm Award – Geddes Brecher Qualls Cunningham.
- Grand prix national de l'architecture – Claude Parent.
- Pritzker Prize – Philip Johnson.
- RAIA Gold Medal – Bryce Mortlock.
- RIBA Royal Gold Medal – Charles and Ray Eames.
- Twenty-five Year Award – Yale University Art Gallery.

== Deaths ==
- April 6 – Ivan Vasilyov, Bulgarian architect (born 1893)
- July 13 – Juraj Neidhardt, Croatian architect, teacher, urban planner and writer (born 1899)
- October 11 – Roger Hayward, US artist, architect, optical designer and astronomer (born 1899)
- December 8 – Sydney Ancher, Australian architect (born 1904)
- December 31 – Charles Draper Faulkner, Chicago-based architect (born 1890)
