= Trigger 4 =

1979 sculpture by Lee Kelly in Portland, Oregon, U.S.

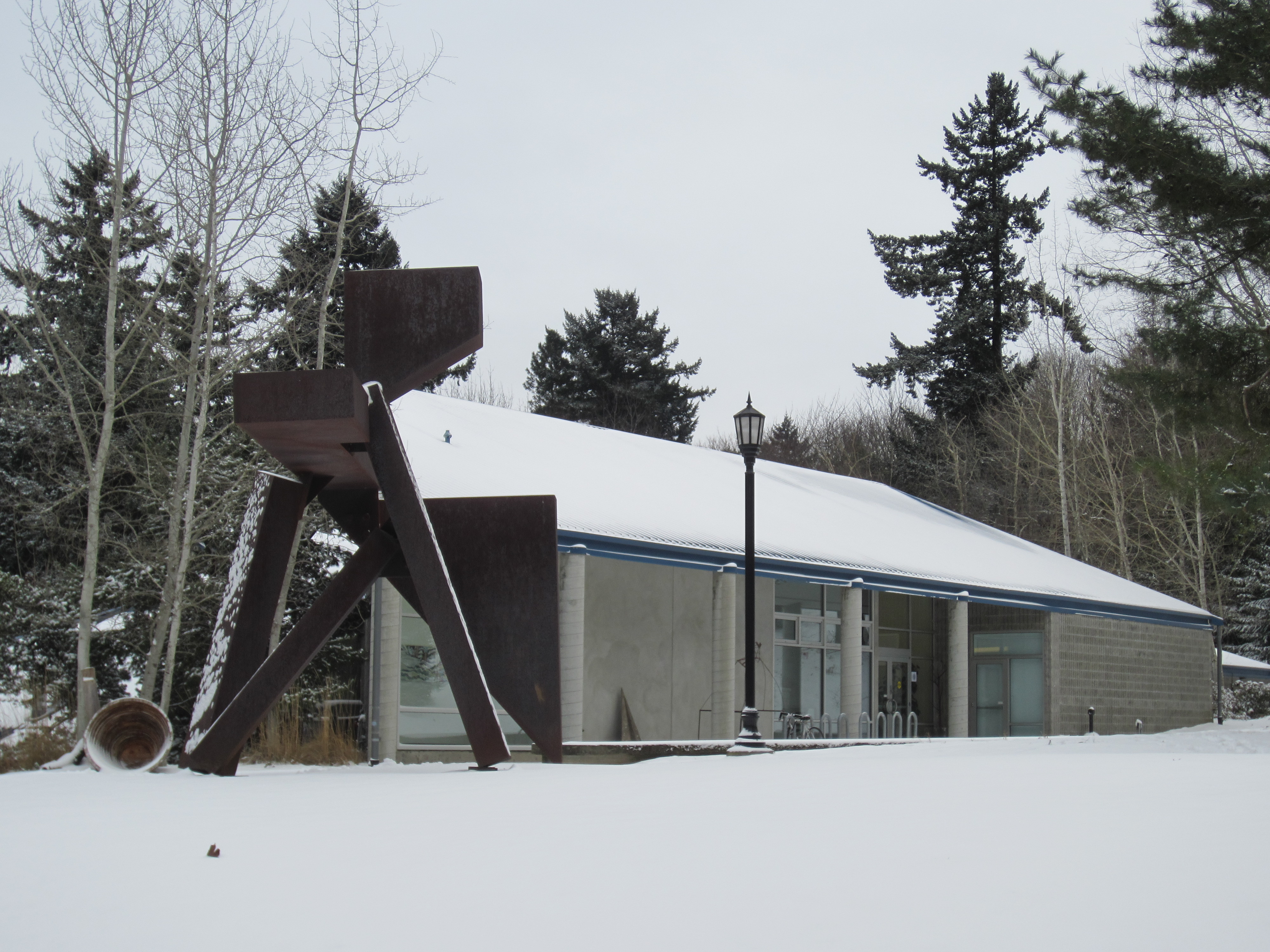
- The sculpture in front of the Studio Art Building on a snowy day in February 2014
- Artist: Lee Kelly
- Year: 1979
- Type: Sculpture
- Medium: Cor-Ten or mild steel
- Dimensions: 3.7 m × 4.7 m × 3.0 m (12 ft × 15.5 ft × 10 ft)
- Condition: "Treatment needed" (1994)
- Location: Portland, Oregon, United States; 45.48035°N 122.62578°W
- Owner: Reed College

Trigger 4, also known as Trigger Four, is an outdoor 1979 steel sculpture by Lee Kelly, located on the Reed College campus in Portland, Oregon, United States.

== Description and history ==
Trigger 4 was designed by Lee Kelly and installed in front of the Studio Art Building on the Reed College campus in southeast Portland in 1979. Kelly had served as a visiting associate professor of art at Reed between 1976 and 1979. Like the Studio Art Building, the sculpture was donated to the college by John Gray, who served as chairman of the Board of Trustees, and his wife Betty.

The Cor-Ten or mild steel sculpture measures approximately 12 feet (3.7 m) x 15.5 feet (4.7 m) x 10 feet (3.0 m) and contains an inscription of Kelly's signature and the number 79 on the bottom of the post on the sculpture's northwest side. The Smithsonian Institution describes the work as an abstract ("geometric") sculpture "whose primary forms are triangles and lines". Its condition was deemed "treatment needed" by Smithsonian's "Save Outdoor Sculpture!" program in February 1994.

== Reception ==
Following the sculpture's installation, Reed magazine questioned whether it depicted a Chinese character, a horse, or simply an abstract figure formed by lines and angles, saying "perhaps the beauty of the new Lee Kelly sculpture... is that it can evoke different images and meanings." The magazine also said the rust-colored sculpture provides a "striking contrast" to the blue roof and grey exterior walls of the newly constructed Studio Art Building.

== See also ==
- 1979 in art
- List of works by Lee Kelly
