= Elkhorn (sculpture) =

Outdoor sculpture by Lee Kelly in the U.S. state of Oregon

- Artist: Lee Kelly
- Year: 1978–1979
- Type: Sculpture
- Dimensions: 3.0 m × 2.4 m × 2.4 m (10 ft × 8 ft × 8 ft)
- Condition: "Treatment needed" (1993)
- Location: West Haven-Sylvan, Oregon, United States
- 45.51083°N 122.76693°W

Elkhorn is an outdoor 1979 sculpture by Lee Kelly, installed at Catlin Gabel School in West Haven-Sylvan, a census-designated place in Washington County and the Portland metropolitan area, in the U.S. state of Oregon.

== Description ==
Lee Kelly's Elkhorn is a welded Cor-Ten steel sculpture installed west of Toad Hall at Catlin Gabel School in West Haven-Sylvan, Oregon. It was designed in 1978, the year his son with Bonnie Bronson, Jason, died of leukemia. The sculpture was commissioned by Kelly's friends, and dedicated in 1979 in his son's memory. The abstract, geometric work features three rectangular legs supporting a rectangular platform, with another rectangular shape suspended underneath the platform. It measures approximately 10 feet (3.0 m) x 8 feet (2.4 m) x 8 feet (2.4 m). One of the sculpture's legs has an inscription that reads Lee Kelly / 1978 and a plaque with the text, ELKHORN / IN MEMORY OF / JASON KELLY / PLACED HERE BY HIS FRIENDS / JUNE 1979.

The sculpture is administered by Catlin Gabel School. It was surveyed and deemed "treatment needed" by the Smithsonian Institution's "Save Outdoor Sculpture!" program in November 1993.

== See also ==
- 1979 in art
- List of works by Lee Kelly
