= Untitled (Lee Kelly, 1973) =

Sculpture in Olympia, Washington, U.S.

- Artist: Lee Kelly
- Year: 1973
- Medium: Stainless steel sculpture
- Location: Olympia, Washington, U.S.
- 47°02′07″N 122°53′52″W

An untitled 1973 stainless steel sculpture by Lee Kelly is installed on the Washington State Capitol campus in Olympia, Washington, United States.

== See also ==
- List of works by Lee Kelly
