= Cubist Still Life with Lemons =

Painting by Roy Lichtenstein

- Artist: Roy Lichtenstein
- Year: 1975
- Dimensions: 228.6 cm × 172.7 cm (90 in × 68 in)

Cubist Still Life with Lemons (sometimes Still Life with Lemons) is a 1975 painting by Roy Lichtenstein, done in oil, graphite, and acrylic paint on canvas.

Lichtenstein had a period of experimentation with still life painting from 1974 to 1976. Measuring 228.6 cm × 172.7 cm (90 in × 68 in), Still Life with Lemons represented a take on still life from the Cubist perspective, with Lichtenstein using many favorite Cubist motifs: "...pitcher, bowl of fruit, and faux wood grain - with some of his own, such as sections of the primary colors red, yellow, and blue, portions of an entablature, and a pattern of diagonal stripes." The work has an element of three-dimensionality due to its overlapping planes and reflection, although this still life series was meant to look flat. According to Jack Cowart, "...The scale of Lichtenstein's [Cubist still life] work is antithetical to the primarily intimate and more closely related nature of real Cubism."

== See also ==
- 1975 in art
