= Sound Garden (Kelly) =

Outdoor sculpture in Bend, Oregon, US

- Artist: Lee Kelly
- Year: 2010
- Medium: Stainless steel sculpture
- Location: Bend, Oregon, United States
- Coordinates: 44.03831°N 121.333531°W

Sound Garden is an outdoor 2010 stainless steel sculpture by Lee Kelly, installed at the intersection of Reed Market Road and Mt. Bachelor Drive in Bend, Oregon, United States. The artwork was acquired by the non-profit organization Art in Public Places, and has been described as a "representation of organic musical notes rising above native plants and trees".

== See also ==
- 2010 in art
- List of public art in Bend, Oregon
- List of works by Lee Kelly
