= Frank E. Beach Memorial Fountain =

1975 stainless steel fountain and sculpture in Portland, Oregon

- Water Sculpture
- The fountain in 2008
- Artist: Lee Kelly (sculptor); James Howell (architect)
- Year: 1975
- Type: Fountain; sculpture
- Medium: Stainless steel
- Dimensions: 3.7 m × 4.6 m × 3.7 m (12 ft × 15 ft × 12 ft)
- Condition: "Well maintained" (1993)
- Location: Portland, Oregon, United States; 45.51878°N 122.70559°W

The Frank E. Beach Memorial Fountain, officially titled Water Sculpture, is an abstract 1975 stainless steel fountain and sculpture by artist Lee Kelly and architect James Howell, installed in Washington Park's International Rose Test Garden in Portland, Oregon. The memorial commemorates Frank E. Beach, who christened Portland the "City of Roses" and proposed the Rose Festival. It was commissioned by the Beach family and cost approximately $15,000. Previously administered by the Metropolitan Arts Commission, the work is now part of the City of Portland and Multnomah County Public Art Collection courtesy of the Regional Arts & Culture Council.

== Description ==
The abstract geometric fountain is installed in a sunken area on the west side of the International Rose Test Garden's upper level, in southwest Portland's Washington Park. The stainless steel sculpture measures 12 feet (3.7 m) x 15 feet (4.6 m) x 12 feet (3.7 m). It comprises three vertical posts supporting two horizontal posts, plus two smaller vertical posts which stand alone. Accompanying the fountain is a plaque which reads:

In memory of Frank E. Beach, 1853–1934
who christened Portland "The Rose City"
and suggested the annual Rose Festival

The artwork cost $15,000 and was described by Kelly as "a symbol of human involvement with the annual renewal of nature". The Oregonian writers Janet Goetze and Jean Henninger described the memorial's crossed columns as "like an ancient architectural structure" and "something like Stonehenge", respectively. In her book The Garden Lover's Guide to the West (2000), Kathleen McCormack said the fountain "provides cooling water music for hot summer days in the garden".

== History ==
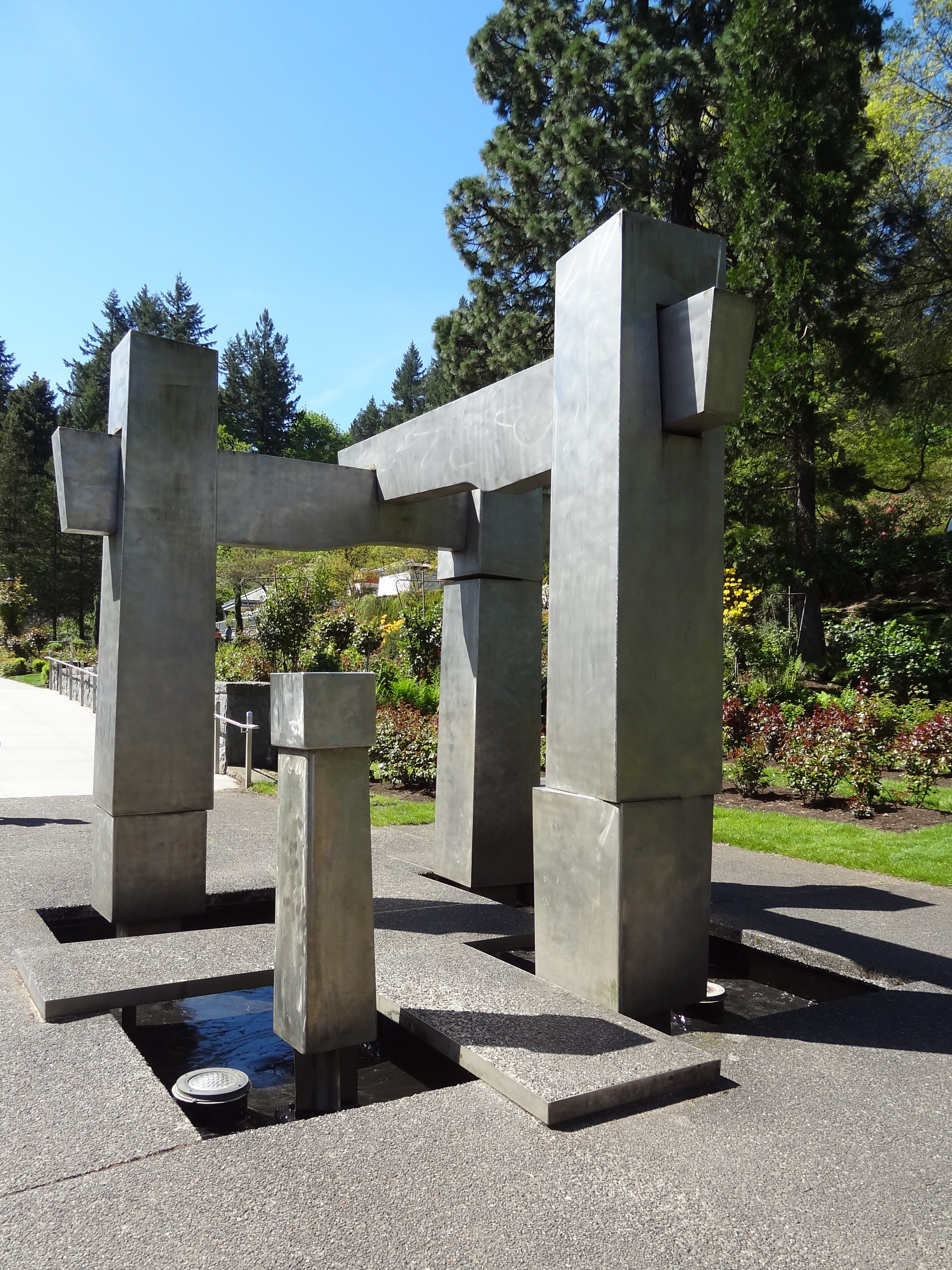
The sculpture in 2019

The sculpture was created and built by Kelly in memory of Frank E. Beach, who christened Portland the "City of Roses" and first proposed the annual Rose Festival. James Howell served as architect; additional assistance was provided by David Cotter and the architectural firm James M. Howell and Associates. It was commissioned as a gift from the Beach family—Frank L. Beach and the estate of Ruth B. Mehlin—in honor of their father.

Frank L. Beach proposed a memorial in 1973. In May 1974, Kelly's design was selected from six proposals by artists who were granted $200 to complete models. Kelly presented his scale model at a press conference hosted at the Portland Art Museum, where the proposed designs by all candidates were exhibited temporarily. The Oregonian described his plans for the artwork, which would be completed within a year: "two 12-foot-high stainless steel arches, joined at right angles, edging a 12-foot square reflecting pool set with water jets", with concrete aggregate paths crossing the pool and benches nearby. Beach traveled from Los Angeles to Portland for the memorial's June 14 groundbreaking ceremony at the International Rose Test Garden, as part of the Rose Festival.

In March 1975, The Oregonian said that the fountain would have water "gently fall from a pair of steel pillars set within" the pool and confirmed that the three benches would also be made from stainless steel. Kelly and the garden's curator reportedly considered having waterlilies in the pool and "subdued" lighting to illuminate the artwork's columns. The sculpture was dedicated by city parks commissioner Mildred Schwab and Beach on June 14, ahead of the Rose Festival's 63rd annual knighting ceremony.

The artwork was surveyed and considered "well maintained" by the Smithsonian Institution's "Save Outdoor Sculpture!" program in October 1993. It was administered by the City of Portland's Metropolitan Arts Commission at that time, and is now part of the City of Portland and Multnomah County Public Art Collection courtesy of the Regional Arts & Culture Council. The sculpture was not wheelchair accessible until the 2010s, when stairs to the area surrounding the installation site were replaced with sloped paths.

== Reception ==
Willamette Week's Shannon Gormley has described the artwork as "meditative" and "one of local legend Lee Kelly's best sculptures". It has been included in published walking tours of Portland and garden tours of the Pacific Northwest.

== See also ==
- 1975 in art
- Fountains in Portland, Oregon
- List of public art in Portland, Oregon
- List of works by Lee Kelly
