= List of works by Lee Kelly =

Lee Kelly is an American artist.

== List of works ==
=== Paintings ===
- Untitled
- Untitled
- Untitled (1959)

=== Sculptures ===
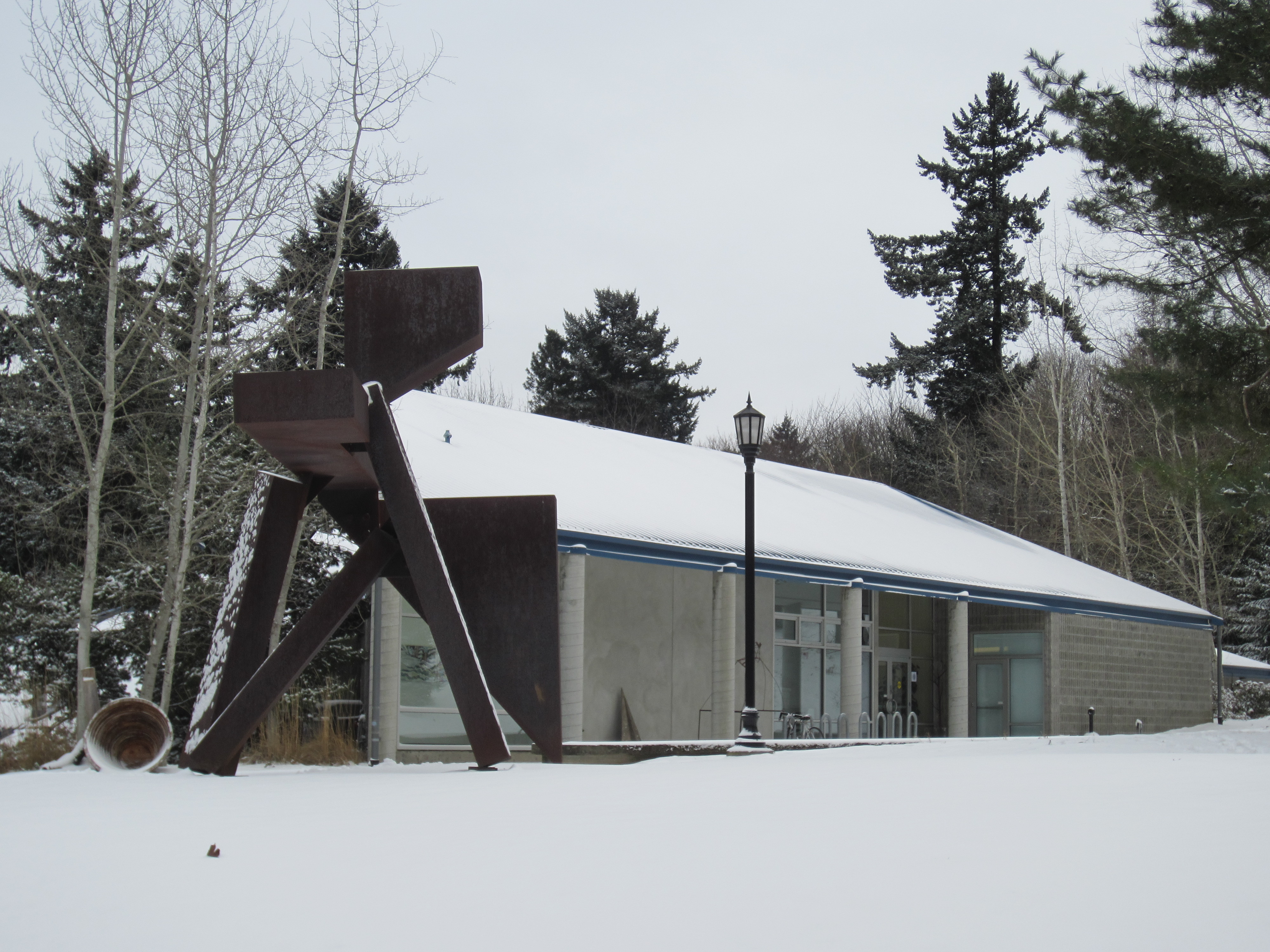
Trigger 4 (1979) in front of the Studio Art Building at Reed College, Portland, Oregon

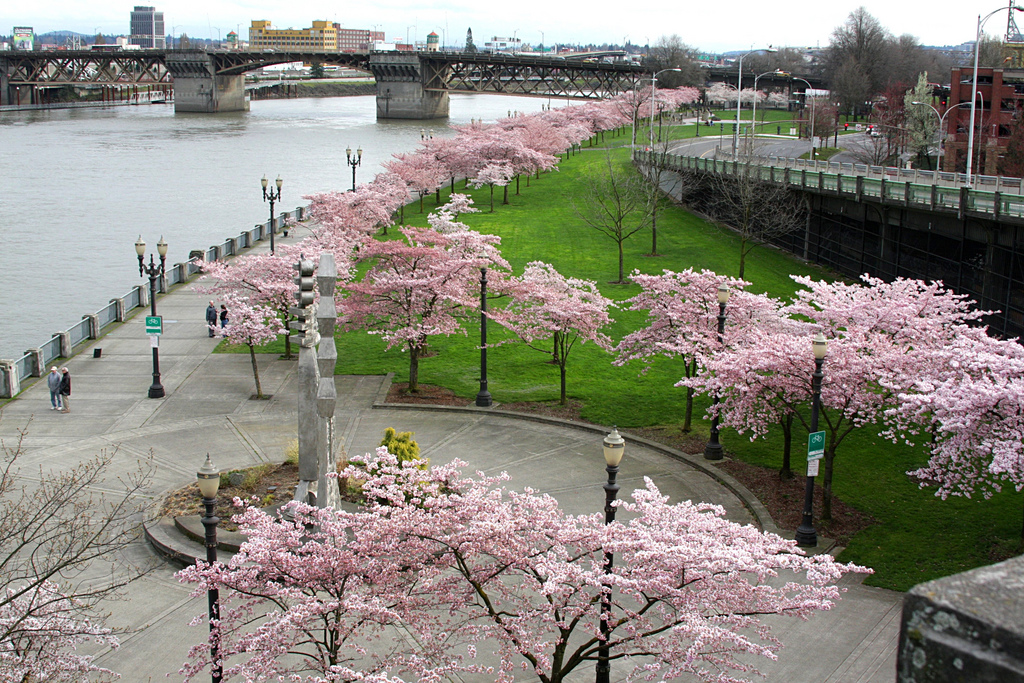
Friendship Circle (1990) at Tom McCall Waterfront Park, Portland, Oregon

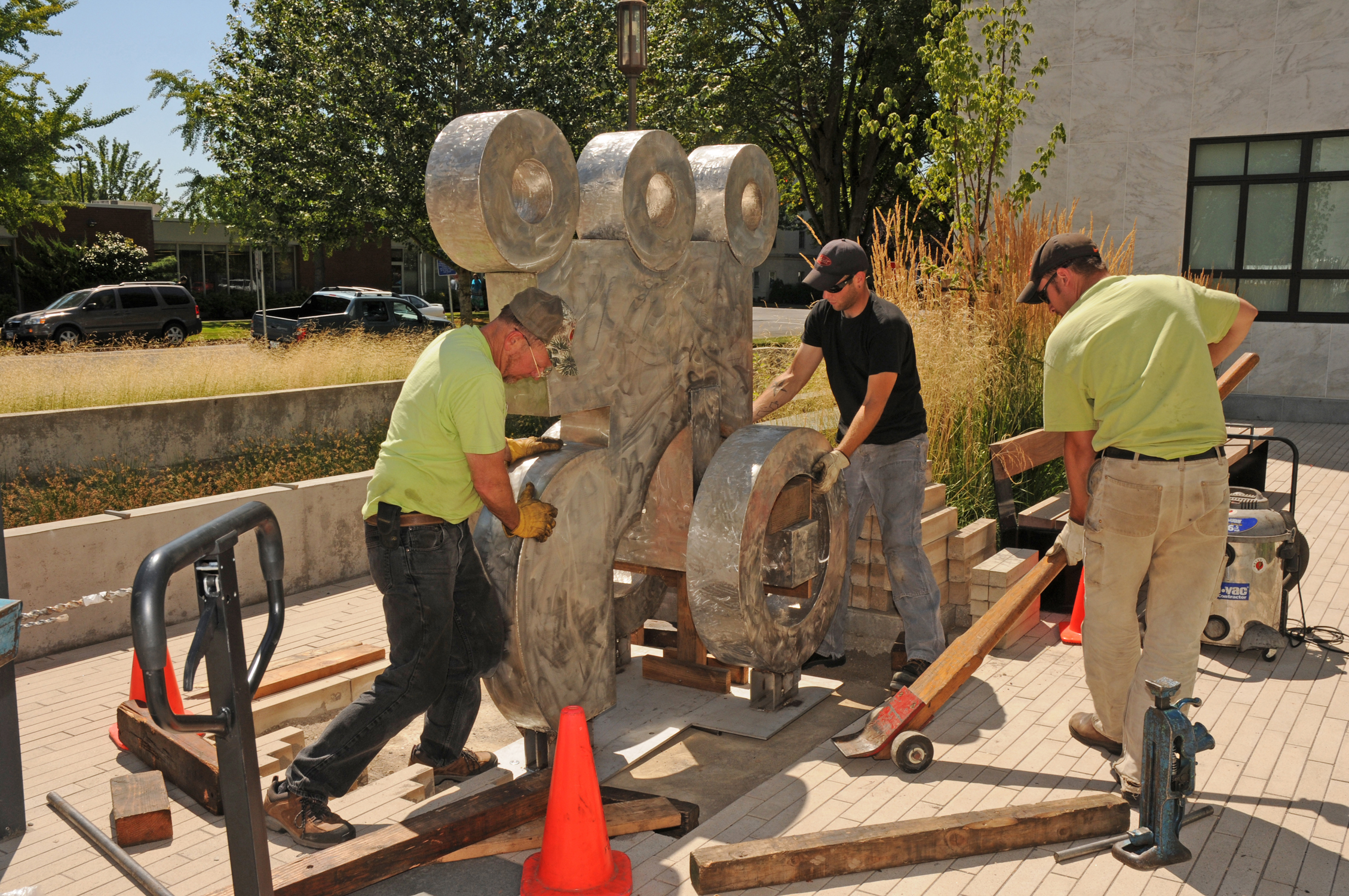
Henry Ford at Delphi (2005) being moved into place in 2012

- Untitled (LK791)
- Untitled (LK793)
- Untitled Study (Icarus in Yucatan)
- Untitled (LK789) (1959)
- Untitled (LK797) (c. 1961)
- Tree of Life (1964), with Bonnie Bronson
- Untitled (LK790) (1965)
- Untitled (Bumper) II (1966–1967)
- Untitled (Bumper) III (1966–1967)
- Untitled (Bumper) IV (1966–1967)
- Untitled (Bumper) V (1966–1967)
- Untitled (Bumper) VI (1966–1967)
- Untitled (Bumper) VII (1966–1967)
- Untitled (Bumper) VIII (1966–1967)
- Untitled (Bumper) IX (1966–1967)
- Untitled (Bumper) X (1966–1967)
- Untitled (Bumper) XI (1966–1967)
- Untitled (Bumper) (1967/2004)
- (Unthank Park Cylindric Sculpture) (1967–1968), Unthank Park, Portland, Oregon
- Study for a Large Sculpture #5 (1969)
- Gate F (1973), Candlestick Park, San Francisco, California
- Untitled (1973), Olympia, Washington
- Frank E. Beach Memorial Fountain (1975), also known as Water Sculpture, International Rose Test Garden, Portland, Oregon
- Leland I (1975), Portland, Oregon (with Bonnie Bronson)
- Untitled fountain (1977), Portland, Oregon
- Arlie (1978)
- Elkhorn (1978–1979), Catlin Gabel School, Portland, Oregon
- Lava Ridge (1978), Whitman College, Walla Walla, Washington
- Nash (1978–1979), Portland, Oregon
- Memory II (1979)
- Trigger 4 (1979), Reed College, Portland, Oregon
- (Abstract) (1982), Portland, Oregon
- Akbar's Garden (1984), University of Oregon, Eugene, Oregon
- Arch with Oaks (1986), Beaverton, Oregon
- Four Columns (1988), Whitman College, Walla Walla, Washington
- Friendship Circle (1990), Tom McCall Waterfront Park, Portland, Oregon (with Michael Stirling)
- Angkor I (1994), Millennium Plaza Park, Lake Oswego, Oregon
- Angkor II
- Angkor IV (1995), Whitman College, Walla Walla, Washington
- Aksary (1996)
- Patan (1996)
- Memory 99 (1999), North Park Blocks, Portland, Oregon
- Wall Study #1 (1999)
- Wall Study #2 (1999)
- Akbar's Elephant (2000)
- Bird Series I (2003)
- Rajastan III (2004)
- Henry Ford at Delphi (2005)
- Mughal Garden (2005)
- Leaving Kathmandu (2006)
- Sulphur Butterfly (2006)
- Howard's Way (2007), Portland, Oregon
- Kyoto 8 (2008)
- Memory IX (2008)
- Goddess Revisited I (2009)
- Goddess Revisited II (2009)
- Goddess Revisited III (2009)
- Goddess Revisited IV (2009)
- Study for Henry Ford at Delphi (2009)
- Sound Garden (2010), Bend, Oregon
- moontrap (2011), Oregon City, Oregon
- Nepal I (2011)
- Nepal II (2011)
- Study for a Large Sculpture #1 (2011)
- Study for a Large Sculpture #2 (2011)
- Study for a Large Sculpture #3 (2011)
- Study for a Large Sculpture #4 (2011)
- Study for Nepal I (2011)
- Study for Nepal II (2011)
- Atacama I (2012)
- Atacama II (2012)
- Atacama III (2012)
- Atacama IV (2012)
- C'hacabuco I (2012)
- C'hacabuco II (2012)
- C'hacabuco III (2012)
- Pumalin (2012)
- Pumalina I (2012)
- Pumalina II (2012)
- Pavilion II (2013)
