= Tree of Life (sculpture) =

Sculpture in Portland, Oregon

- Artist: Lee Kelly; Bonnie Bronson
- Year: 1964
- Location: Portland, Oregon, United States
- 45.57307°N 122.72979°W

Tree of Life is an outdoor 1964 sculpture by Lee Kelly and Bonnie Bronson, with additional assistance from John Jelly and architect John Murtaugh, installed on the exterior of the University of Portland's Mehling Hall, in Portland, Oregon, United States.

== Description ==
Tree of Life is an abstract metal sculpture depicting of tree with stylized branches and leaves. It is made of nickel silver and stainless steel, enameled blue and green, and measures approximately 54 feet (16 m) x 5 feet (1.5 m) x 6 inches (0.15 m). The Smithsonian Institution categorizes the sculpture as an allegorical representation of life, and says the tree is a "Christian symbol of growth, fruitfulness, spiritual evolution and diversity among unity".

== History ==
The sculpture was commissioned by the University of Portland for the women's dormitory in 1964, and dedicated on November 22.

Tree of Life was surveyed as part of Smithsonian's "Save Outdoor Sculpture!" program in 1993.

== See also ==
- 1964 in art
- List of works by Lee Kelly
