= Friendship Circle (sculpture) =

Sculpture in Portland, Oregon

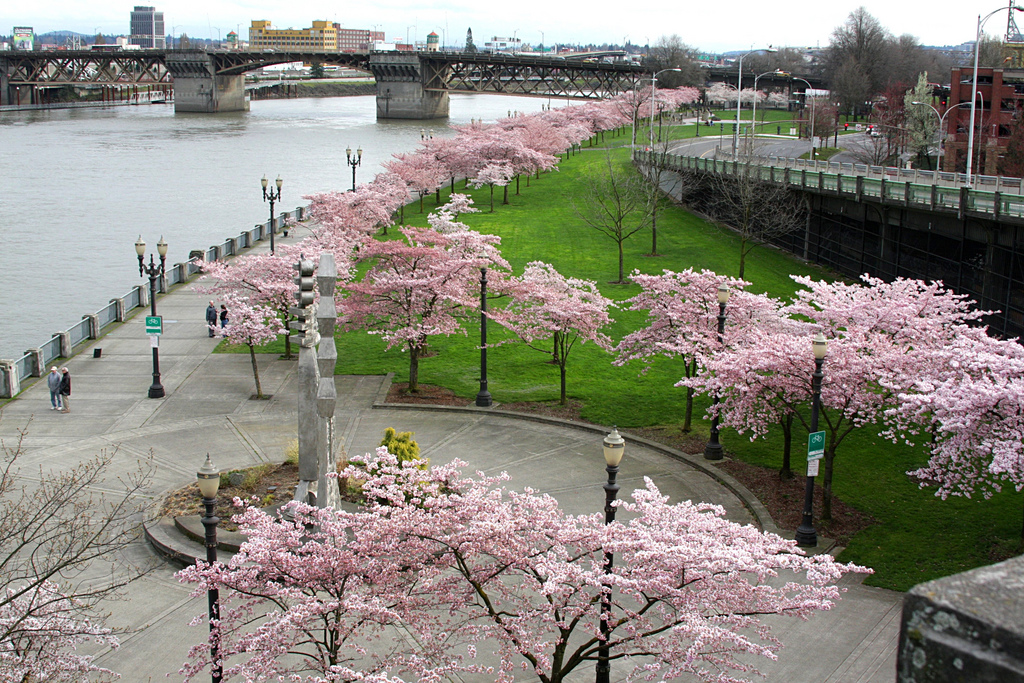
- Artist: Lee Kelly; Michael Stirling
- Year: 1990
- Type: Sculpture
- Medium: Stainless steel, digital audio
- Location: Portland, Oregon, United States; 45°31′35″N 122°40′13″W

Friendship Circle is a collaborative art installation by American artist Lee Kelly and musician Michael Stirling, located in Portland, Oregon's Tom McCall Waterfront Park, in the United States. The installation features a stainless steel sculpture with two 20-foot towers, designed by Kelly, and a 35-minute score composed by Stirling. It celebrates the sister city relationship between Portland and Sapporo, Japan.

== Description and history ==
Friendship Circle was commissioned and installed in 1990. According to the Regional Arts & Culture Council, which administers the work, the sculpture's two structures measure 22 feet (6.7 m) × 8 feet (2.4 m) and 24 feet (7.3 m) × 9 feet (2.7 m), respectively.

== See also ==
- 1990 in art
- List of works by Lee Kelly
