= Howard's Way (sculpture) =

Sculpture in Portland, Oregon

- The sculpture in 2016
- Artist: Lee Kelly
- Year: 2007
- Type: Sculpture
- Medium: Stainless steel
- Location: Portland, Oregon, United States; 45°31′23″N 122°41′26″W
- Owner: City of Portland

Howard's Way is an outdoor 2007 art installation comprising four stainless steel sculptures by American artist Lee Kelly, located in downtown Portland, Oregon.

== Description and history ==
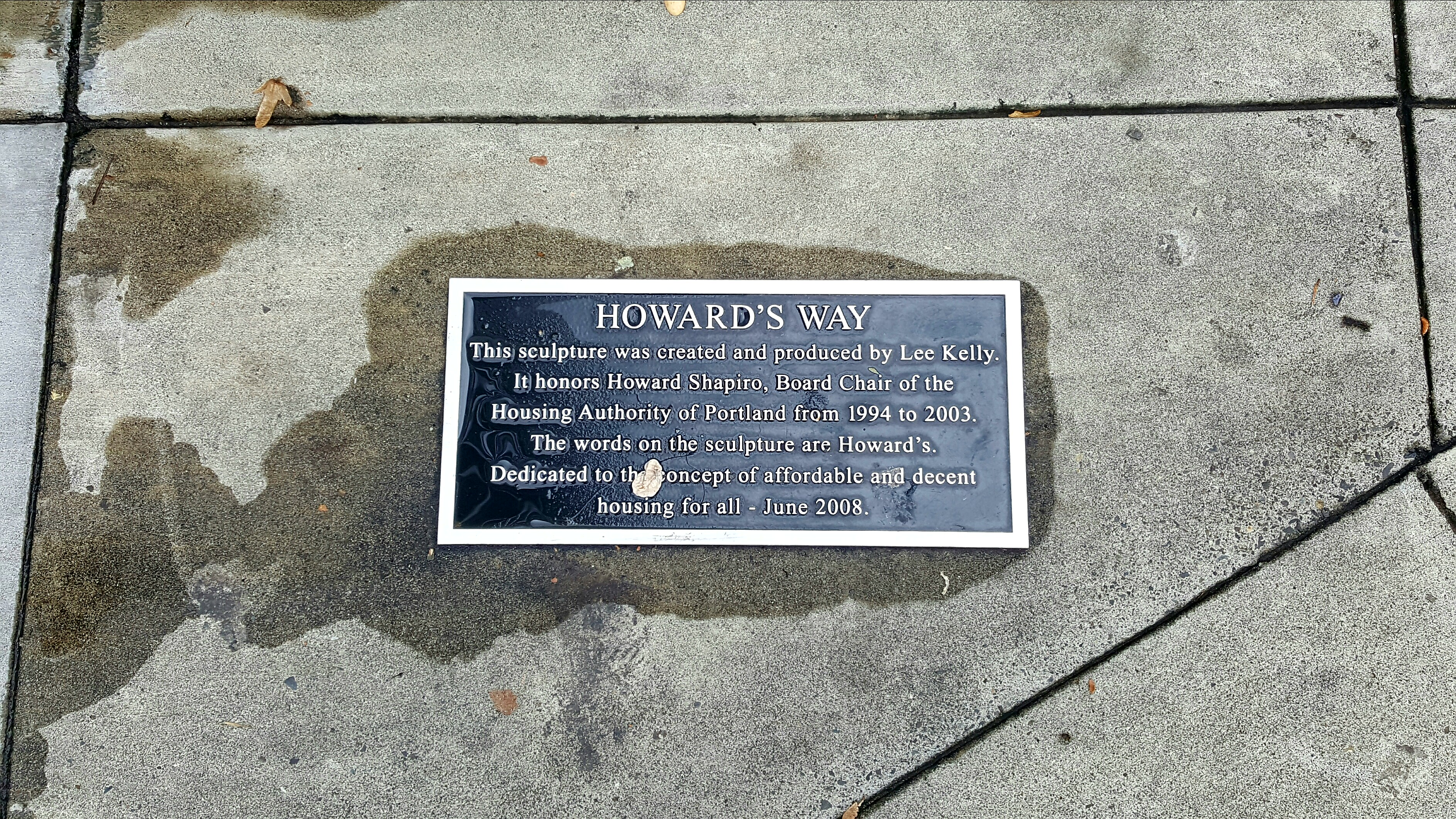
Plaque for the sculpture

The work was commissioned by the Housing Authority of Portland for the downtown development project called "The Civic/The Morrison", and funded by the City of Portland's Percent for Art program and Civic Housing Development Services. The "suite" of sculptures were installed at the Civic Apartments (635 Southwest 19th Avenue) at West Burnside Street and Northwest 19th Avenue. Howard's Way shares its name with the plaza between two buildings in which it was installed; both are named for Howard Shapiro, the Housing Authority's former chair. The work's four pieces are 11 feet (3.4 m) tall and 1,300 lbs., 9 feet (2.7 m), 6 inches (15 cm) tall and 1,250 lbs., 2 feet (0.61 m) tall and 640 lbs., and 12 feet (3.7 m) tall and 1,050 lbs., respectively. It was dedicated in October 2007.

== See also ==
- 2007 in art
- List of works by Lee Kelly
