= 1975 in art =

Events from the year 1975 in art.

== Events ==
- 22 March – Malmö Konsthall, designed by Klas Anshelm, opens in Sweden for the display of contemporary art.
- 10 June – Fundació Joan Miró in Barcelona, designed by Josep Lluís Sert, is opened.
- 14 September – Rembrandt's painting The Night Watch is slashed a dozen times at the Rijksmuseum in Amsterdam.
- unknown dates
  - The artists' community Kollektiv Herzogstrasse is founded by Heimrad Prem and others.
  - The Brotherhood of Ruralists is established at Wellow, Somerset, England.
  - Mona Hatoum leaves her native Lebanon to study at the Byam Shaw School of Art in London.
  - Four Ronnie Landfield paintings from the collection of Philip Johnson are installed at The Four Seasons Restaurant in New York City, on the wall which Mark Rothko was initially commissioned to create paintings for, and subsequently changed his mind. (In 1985 they are replaced by a mural.)
  - Center for Creative Photography archival facility created at the University of Arizona, Tucson.
  - An album created in 1864 by Julia Margaret Cameron for John Herschel is purchased by public subscription in Britain, one of the first recognitions of the country's heritage of photography as an art form.

== Awards ==
- Archibald Prize: Kevin Connor – The Hon Sir Frank Kitto, KBE

== Exhibitions ==
- Brice Marden retrospective at the Solomon R. Guggenheim Museum.

== Works ==
- Vito Acconci – Plot
- Dara Birnbaum – Attack Piece
- Marcel Broodthaers – Daguerre's Soup, La salle blanche
- Avard Fairbanks – George Washington (bronze, Washington, D.C.)
- Rose Finn-Kelcey – The Restless Image: a discrepancy between the seen position and the felt position (photograph of performance)
- Elisabeth Frink – Shepherd and Sheep
- Giancarlo Impiglia - Mural of "Old New York" at 99 John Street
- Robert Indiana - Hexagon; Heptagon; Octagon; and Nonagon
- Lee Kelly – Frank E. Beach Memorial Fountain (Portland, Oregon)
- Lee Kelly and Bonnie Bronson – Leland I (sculpture, Portland, Oregon)
- Eduardo Kingman – Unidad
- Gordon Matta-Clark – Day's End, Conical Intersect
- Louise Berliawsky Nevelson – Transparent Horizon

== Births ==
- 1 January – Eiichiro Oda, Japanese manga artist
- 13 June – Johannes Grenzfurthner, Austrian artist, writer, curator and director.
- 14 June – Chris Onstad, American writer, cartoonist and artist
- 30 July – Graham Nicholls, British installation artist, activist and speaker
- 1 August – Vhrsti, Czech illustrator
- unknown dates
  - Samson Kambalu, Malawi-born multimedia artist
  - Hassan khan, British multimedia artist
  - Paul Renaud, French illustrator and comic book artist
  - Alys Tomlinson, English photographer

== Deaths ==
=== January to June ===
- 13 January – Leonardo Dudreville, Italian painter (b. 1885)
- 19 January – Thomas Hart Benton, American painter and muralist (b. 1889)
- 23 February – Roger Hilton, English painter (b. 1911)
- 2 March – Madeleine Vionnet, French fashion designer (b. 1876)
- 7 March – Erika Abels d'Albert, Austrian artist (b. 1896)
- 9 March – Gleb W. Derujinsky, Russian-American sculptor (b. 1888)
- 10 April – Walker Evans, American photographer (b. 1903)
- 30 April – Gen Paul, French painter and engraver (b. 1895)
- 20 May – Barbara Hepworth, English sculptor and artist (b. 1903)

=== July to December ===
- 18 July – Vaughn Bodē, American underground comics, graphic design and graffiti artist, of autoerotic asphyxiation (b. 1941)
- 21 July – George Petty, American pin-up artist (b. 1894)
- 28 August – Fritz Wotruba, Austrian sculptor (b. 1907)
- 2 October – Séamus Murphy, Irish sculptor (b. 1907)
- 9 October - Leon Underwood, English sculptor (b. 1890)
- 25 October – Padraig Marrinan, Irish painter (b. 1906)
- 17 November – Michael Ayrton, English sculptor, graphic artist and writer (b. 1921)
- 20 December – Heinz Henghes, German sculptor (b. 1906)
- unknown date – Robert George Irwin, American sculptor and spree killer (b. 1907).

== See also ==
- 1975 in fine arts of the Soviet Union
