= Nash (sculpture) =

Sculpture by Lee Kelly in Portland, Oregon, U.S.

- The sculpture in 2021
- Artist: Lee Kelly
- Year: 1978–1979
- Type: Sculpture
- Medium: Stainless steel
- Dimensions: 3.0 m × 2.7 m × 3.6 m (120 in × 106 in × 140 in)
- Condition: "Well maintained" (1993)
- Location: Portland, Oregon, United States; 45.51547°N 122.65594°W

Nash is an outdoor 1978–1979 sculpture by Lee Kelly, installed in southeast Portland, Oregon, United States.

== Description ==
Lee Kelly's Nash is a stainless steel sculpture installed at 1019 Southeast 10th Avenue in Portland's Buckman neighborhood. The abstract, geometric work measures approximately 120 inches (3.0 m) x 106 inches (2.7 m) x 140 inches (3.6 m). It includes an inscription with the text "Lee Kelly / 78–79" and the artist's monogram, which joins the letters "L" and "K". The sculpture is administered by the National Builders Hardware Company. It was surveyed and considered "well maintained" by the Smithsonian Institution's "Save Outdoor Sculpture!" program in November 1993.

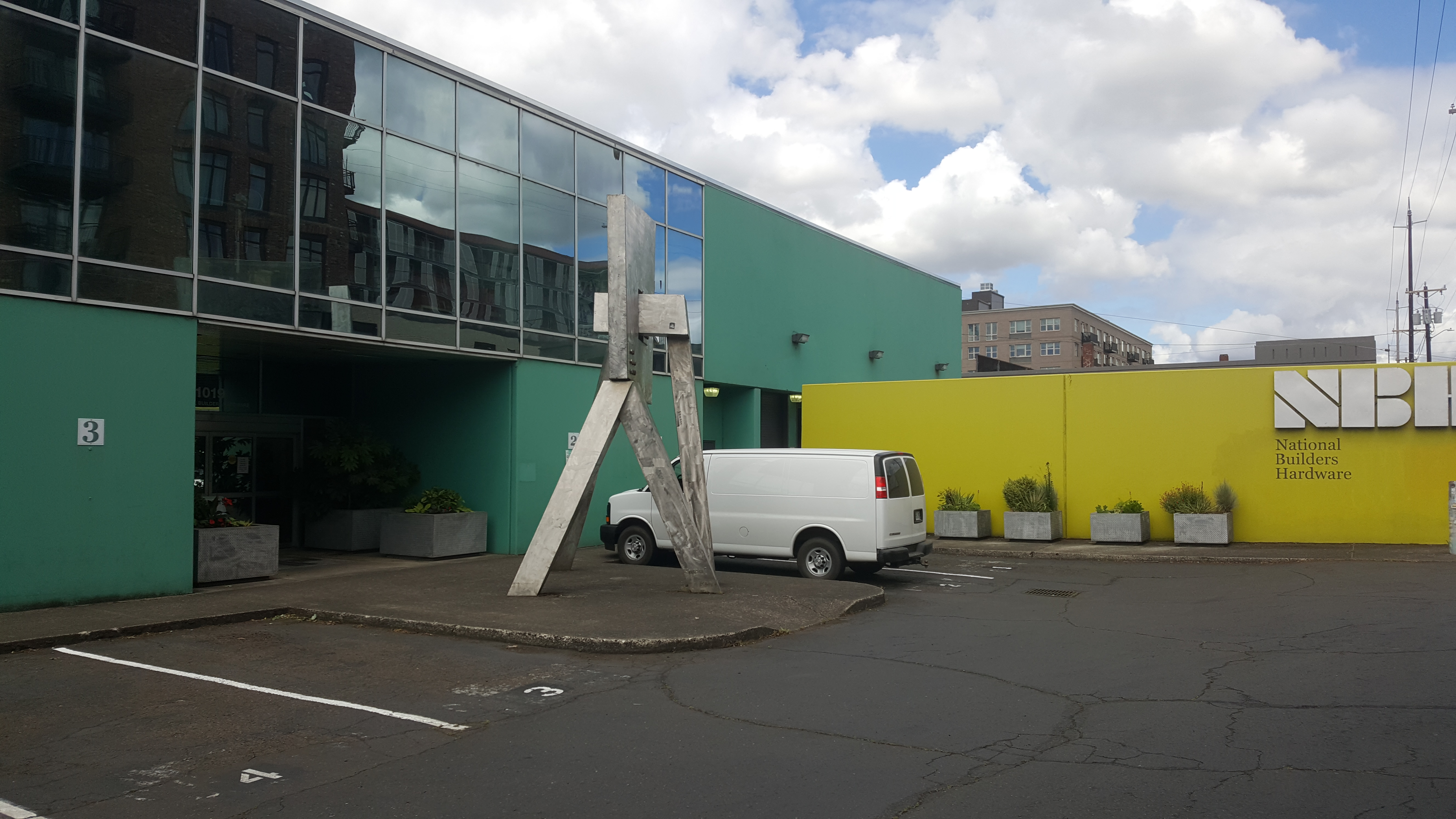

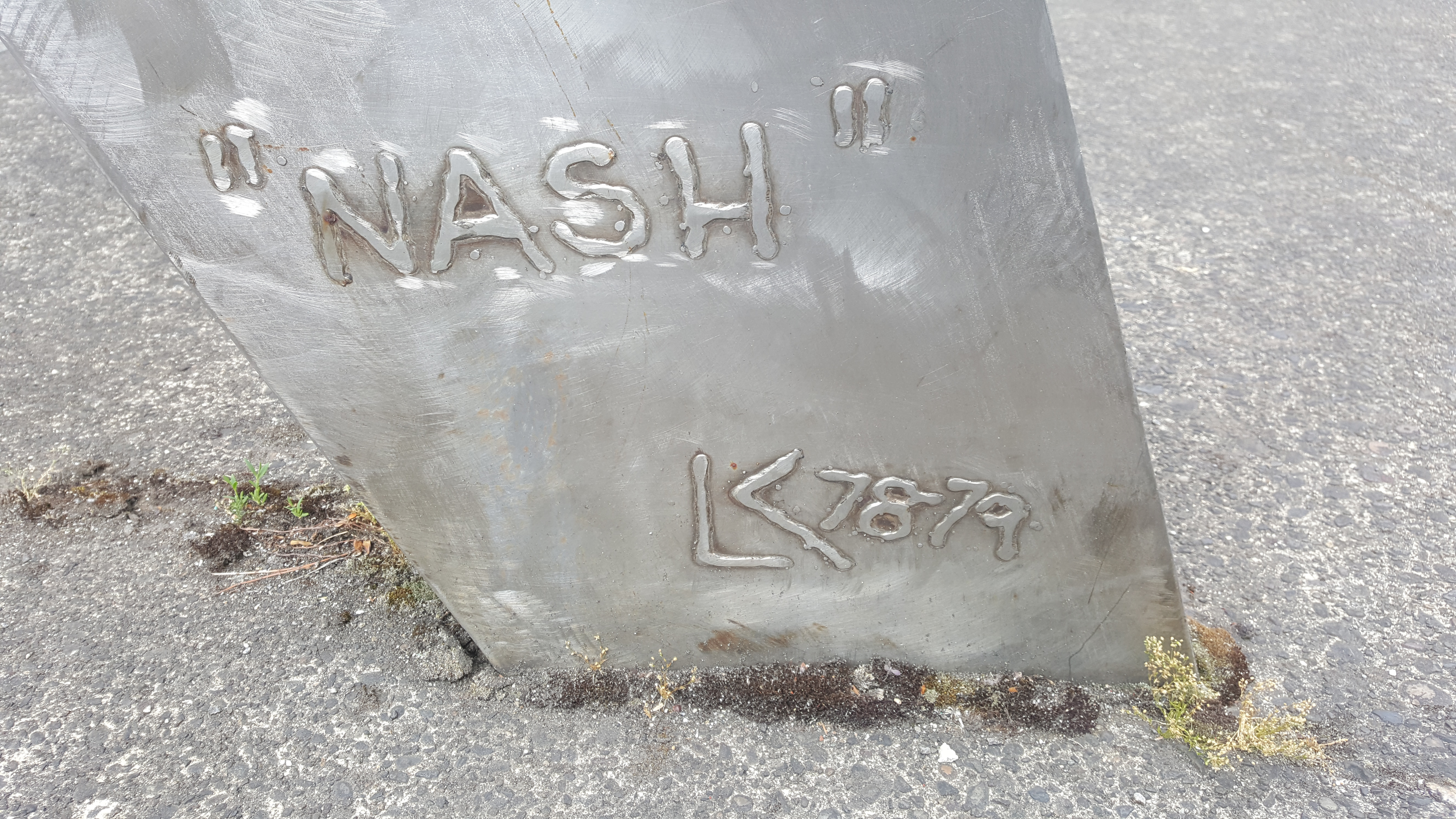

== See also ==
- 1979 in art
- List of works by Lee Kelly
