= Akbar's Garden =

Sculpture by Lee Kelly in Eugene, Oregon, U.S.

- The sculpture in 2015
- Artist: Lee Kelly
- Year: 1983–1984
- Type: Sculpture
- Medium: Aluminum
- Dimensions: 5.2 m (17 ft)
- Location: Eugene, Oregon, United States; 44.04359°N 123.07436°W

Akbar's Garden is an outdoor 1983–1984 aluminum sculpture by Lee Kelly, installed at the University of Oregon campus in Eugene, Oregon, in the United States.

== Description and history ==
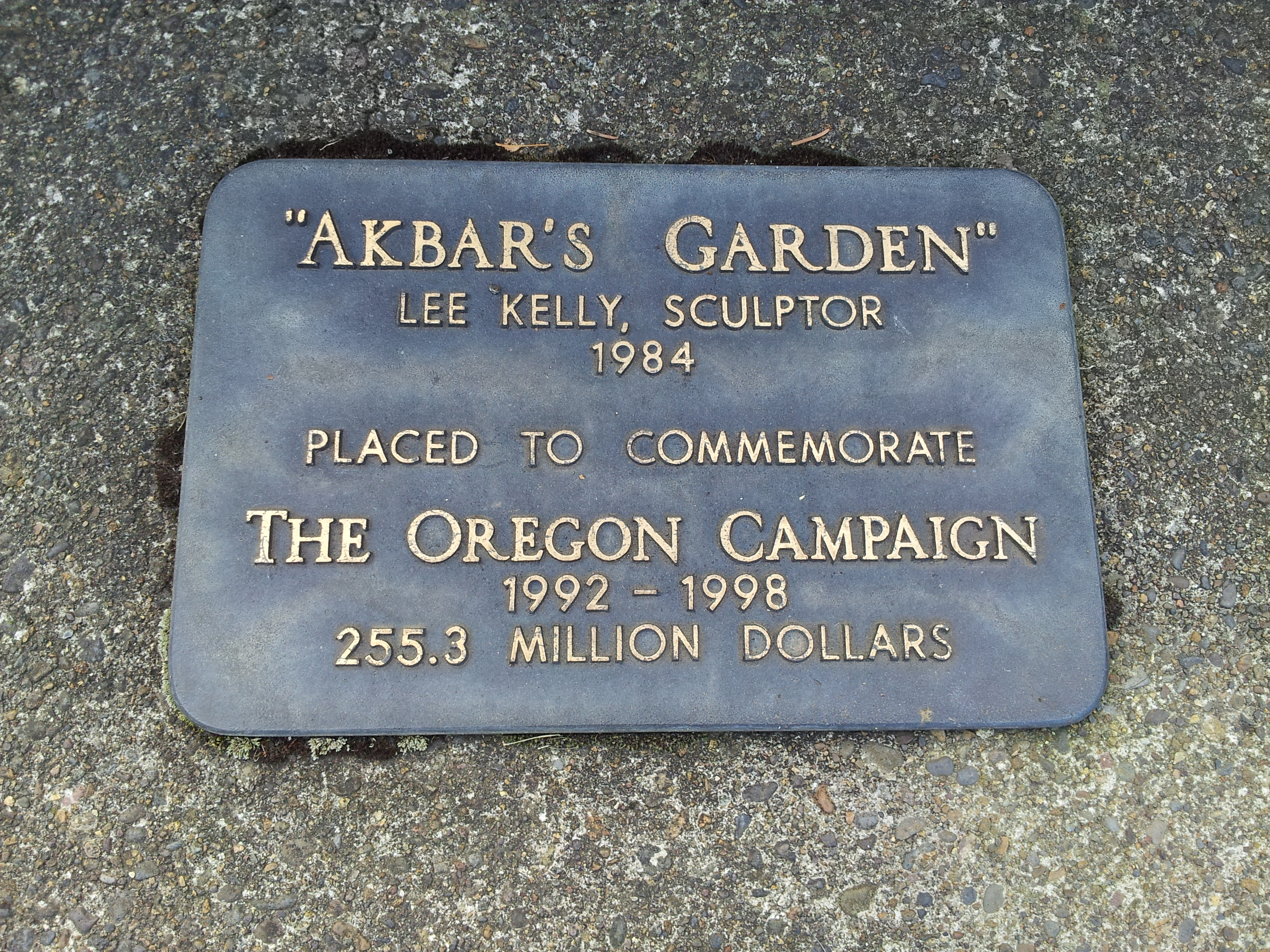
Plaque for the sculpture

Lee Kelly's Akbar's Garden (1984) is a 17-foot (5.2 m) tooled aluminum sculpture installed in Straub Quadrangle, across from the Student Recreation Center, on the University of Oregon campus. The work was donated by art collector and philanthropist Jordan D. Schnitzer and his parents Harold and Arlene Schnitzer in 2002. Before then, it was installed at the Claremont Hotel in Berkeley California. According to the Jordan Schnitzer Family Foundation, Akbar's Garden commemorates the "Oregon Campaign" that raised more than $225 million for the University between 1992 and 1998.

== See also ==
- 1984 in art
- List of works by Lee Kelly
