= Kelly Lee =

Kelly Lee may refer to:

- Kelly Lee, a character in the American daytime television soap opera General Hospital
- Kelly Lee, an actress in the 2000 Taiwanese drama film Yi Yi

== See also ==
- Lee Kelly
