= Leland I =

Sculpture in Portland, Oregon

- The sculpture in 2015
- Artist: Lee Kelly; Bonnie Bronson
- Year: 1975
- Type: Sculpture
- Medium: Cor-Ten steel; vitrified porcelain
- Dimensions: 910 cm × 610 cm × 460 cm (30 ft × 20 ft × 15 ft)
- Condition: "Treatment needed" (1994)
- Location: Portland, Oregon, United States; 45.50687°N 122.67985°W
- Owner: City of Portland

Leland I, sometimes stylized as Leland 1 or Leland #1, is an outdoor 1975 sculpture by Lee Kelly and Bonnie Bronson, installed in Portland, Oregon, United States.

== Description and history ==
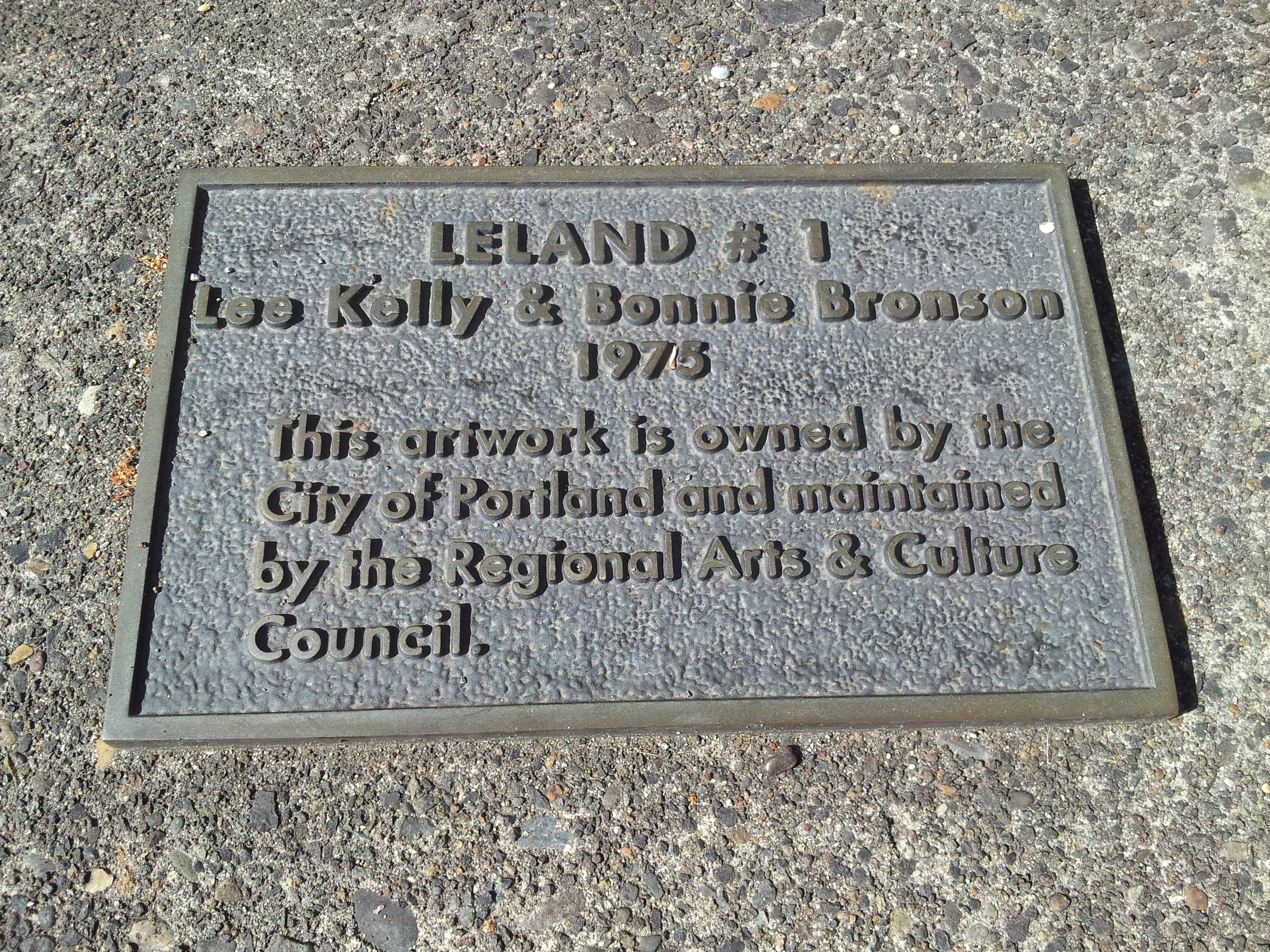
Plaque for the sculpture, which reads in part: "This artwork is owned by the City of Portland and maintained by the Regional Arts & Culture Council."

Leland I was designed by Lee Kelly and Bonnie Bronson, and marked one of the former's first large scale public artworks. In addition, Ron Travers from the architectural firm Travers-Johnston served as architect and Robert Gardner from the McArthur/Gardner Partnership served as landscape architect. Pioneer Enamel was the contractor and David Cotter was an assistant. The welded Cor-Ten steel and vitrified porcelain sculpture was completed during 1973–1975 and installed in the American Plaza Towers courtyard (called American Plaza), at the intersection of Southwest 2nd Avenue and Lincoln Street, in 1975, having been commissioned and funded by the Portland Development Commission.

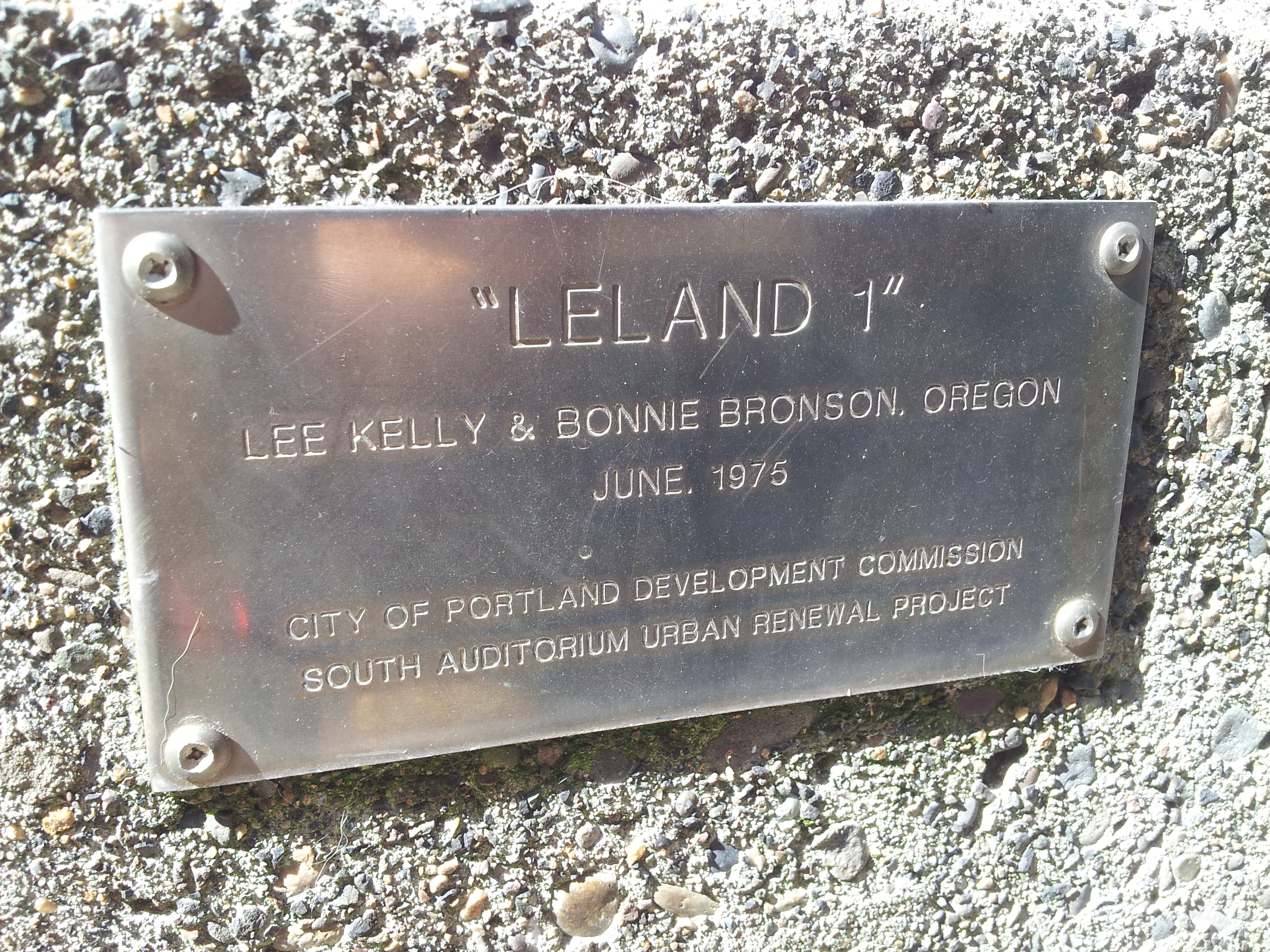
Plaque for the sculpture, which reads in part, "City of Portland Development Commission / South Auditorium Urban Renewal Project".

The abstract, geometric sculpture is constructed from three square and rectangular forms. Overall, the installation measures approximately 30 feet (9.1 m) x 20 feet (6.1 m) x 15 feet (4.6 m) and weighs 15,565 pounds (7,060 kg). Its pieces measure 115 inches (2.9 m) x 96 inches (2.4 m) x 56 inches (1.4 m) (east), 90 inches (2.3 m) x 67 inches (1.7 m) x 132 inches (3.4 m) (middle), and 20 feet (6.1 m) x 55 inches (1.4 m) x 56 inches (1.4 m) (west), respectively. The installation features lighting also designed by the artists. Leland I was surveyed and considered "treatment needed" by the Smithsonian's "Save Outdoor Sculpture!" program in January 1994. In 2010, it was restored to address structural issues and saved from deaccession. Funding for the conservation efforts was provided by the National Endowment for the Arts, the Regional Arts & Culture Council, residents of the American Plaza Towers, and Kelly patrons.

== Reception ==
According to the Regional Arts & Culture Council, which administers the work, the sculpture is considered a "seminal" piece in the City of Portland's public art collection. It has been called "temple-like" by art ltd. magazine and "striking" by the Oregon Arts Commission.

== See also ==
- 1975 in art
- List of works by Lee Kelly
