= 118 Modules =

Sculpture by American artist John Rogers

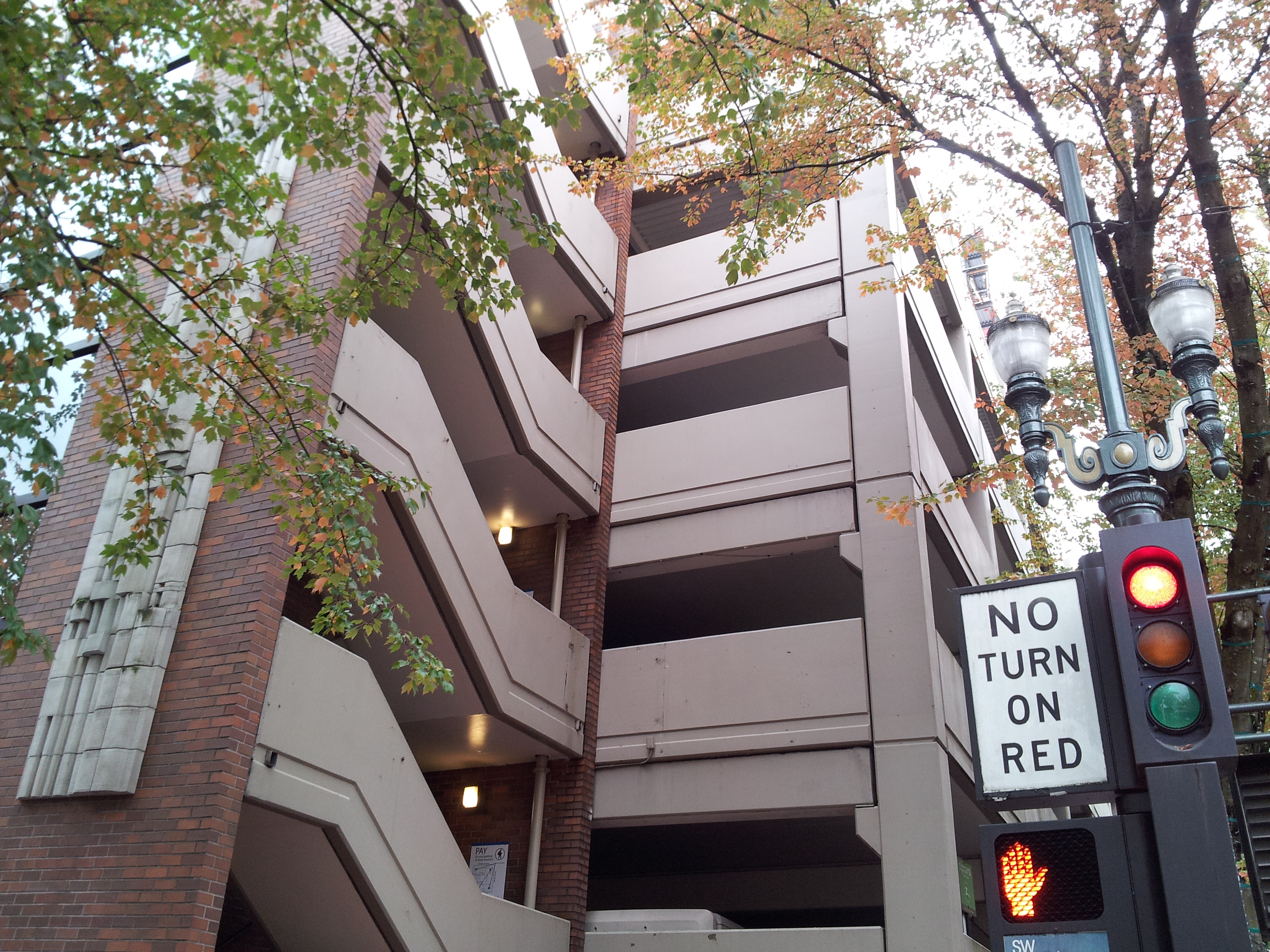
- The sculpture on the side of the parking garage at Southwest 10th and Southwest Yamhill in 2014
- Artist: John Winston Rogers
- Year: 1979
- Type: Sculpture
- Medium: Slip-cast white stoneware
- Dimensions: 1.2 m × 7.0 m × 1.5 m (4 ft × 23 ft × 5 ft)
- Location: Portland, Oregon, United States; 45°31′10″N 122°40′56″W
- Owner: City of Portland and Multnomah County Public Art Collection courtesy of the Regional Arts & Culture Council

118 Modules is an outdoor 1979 sculpture by American artist John Rogers, located at the parking garage at Southwest Yamhill Street between Southwest 9th and 10th Avenues in downtown Portland, Oregon.

The slip-cast white stoneware sculpture measures 4 feet (1.2 m) x 23 feet (7.0 m) x 5 inches (0.13 m). It was funded by the Comprehensive Employment and Training Act (CETA) and marks the artist's first public art commission. Rogers is a Portland native and graduate of Portland State University. 118 Modules is part of the City of Portland and Multnomah County Public Art Collection courtesy of the Regional Arts & Culture Council.

== See also ==
- 1979 in art
