= George Washington (Fairbanks) =

Series of sculptures by Avard Fairbanks in Washington, D.C., U.S.

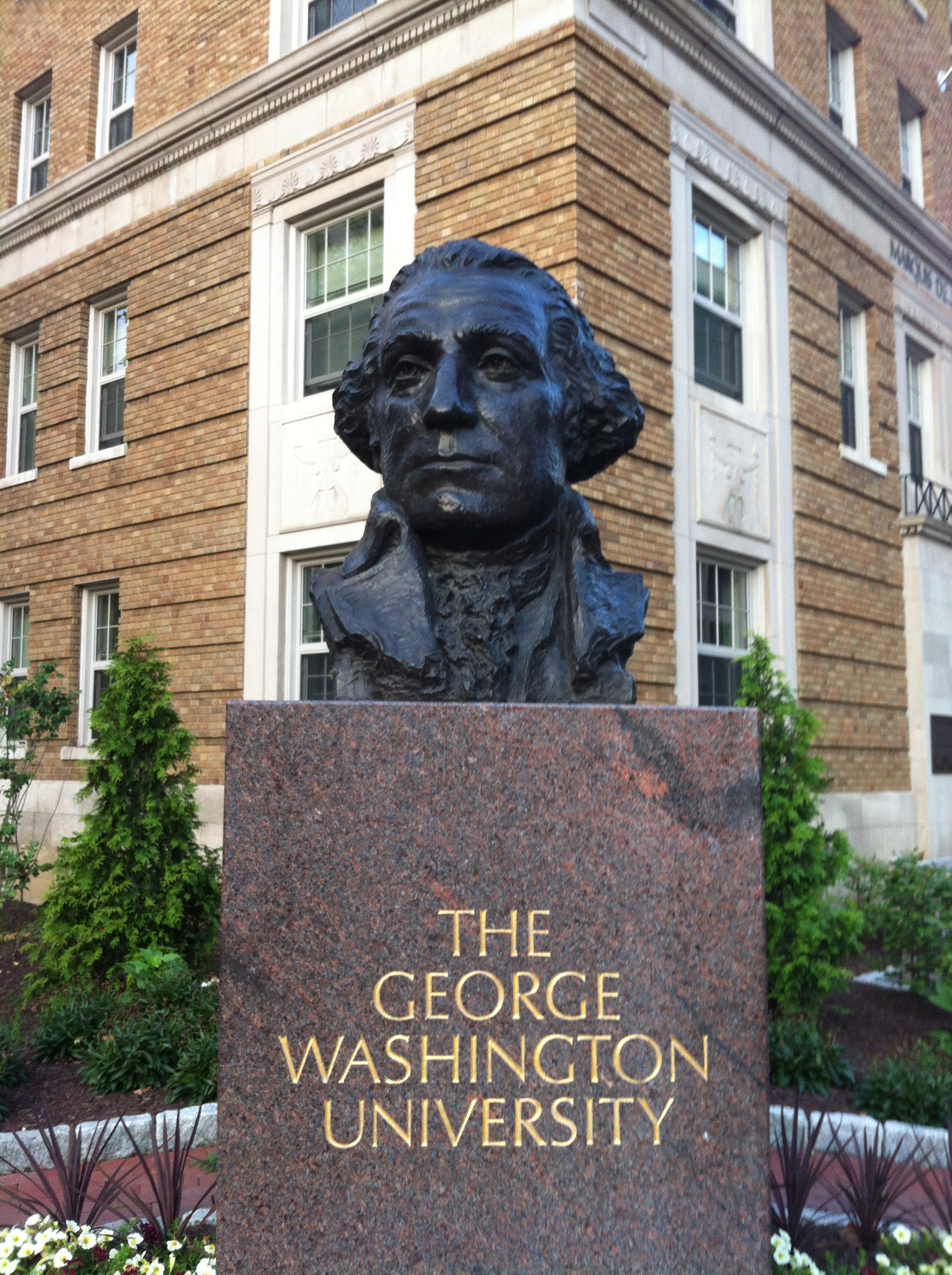
- The bust in 2012
- Artist: Avard Fairbanks
- Medium: Bronze sculpture
- Subject: George Washington
- Location: Washington, D.C.
- 38°54′02″N 77°02′48″W

George Washington is a series of five outdoor bronze busts depicting George Washington by Avard Fairbanks, located on the George Washington University campus in Washington, D.C. They serve as unofficial boundary markers of the university's territory. The five statues are located at the following intersections:

1. Southwest corner of 21st Street and I Street
2. Northwest corner of 20th Street and F Street
3. Northeast corner of 23rd Street and F Street
4. Southwest corner of 23rd Street and I Street (at the eastern entrance to the Foggy Bottom metro station walkway)
5. Southeast corner of 24th Street and I Street (at the western entrance to the Foggy Bottom metro station walkway)

== History ==
Copyrighted in 1975 and dedicated on February 16, 1993, the sculpture measures approximately 46 x 32 x 27 inches, with a granite base measuring approximately 68 x 42 1/2 x 33 inches.

On June 1, 2020, campus police found the bust was not in place upon its pedestal during local protests over the George Floyd case, though it was not damaged and found nearby.

== See also ==
- 1975 in art
- List of public art in Washington, D.C., Ward 2
