= Dancer's Series: Steps =

Sculpture series in Seattle, Washington, U.S.

- The 'tango' part of the sculpture, 2022
- Artist: Jack Mackie; Charles Greening
- Year: 1979
- Type: Sculpture
- Medium: Sculpture: bronze Base: concrete
- Condition: "Well maintained" (1995)
- Location: Seattle, Washington, United States; 47°37′16″N 122°19′15″W

Dancer's Series: Steps is an outdoor 1979 bronze sculpture series by artists Jack Mackie and Charles Greening, installed on the sidewalks of a nine-block stretch of Broadway between Pine and Roy streets in the Capitol Hill neighborhood of Seattle, Washington.

== Description ==
The installation features nine dance patterns, some of which are "imaginary", inlaid in the sidewalk: Lindy, Mambo, Obeebo, Bus stop, Cha Cha, Foxtrot, Rumba, Tango, and Waltz. They are located between Roy and Pine streets on Broadway.

== History ==
The installation was designed and copyrighted in 1979 and dedicated in 1982. It was surveyed and deemed "well maintained" by the Smithsonian Institution's "Save Outdoor Sculpture!" program in April 1995.

== See also ==
- 1979 in art
