= 1979 in fine arts of the Soviet Union =

The year 1979 was marked by many events that left an imprint on the history of Soviet and Russian Fine Arts.

== Events ==
- Spring Exhibition of works by Leningrad artists was opened in the Leningrad Union of Artists.
- Exhibition of works by Yuri Neprintsev dedicated to 70th Anniversary was opened in the Museum of the Academy of Arts of the USSR in Leningrad.
- Exhibition of works by Gevork Kotiantz was opened in the Leningrad Union of Artists.
- Exhibition of works by Alexander Lubimov (1879–1955) dedicated to 100-years Anniversary was opened in the Leningrad Union of Artists.
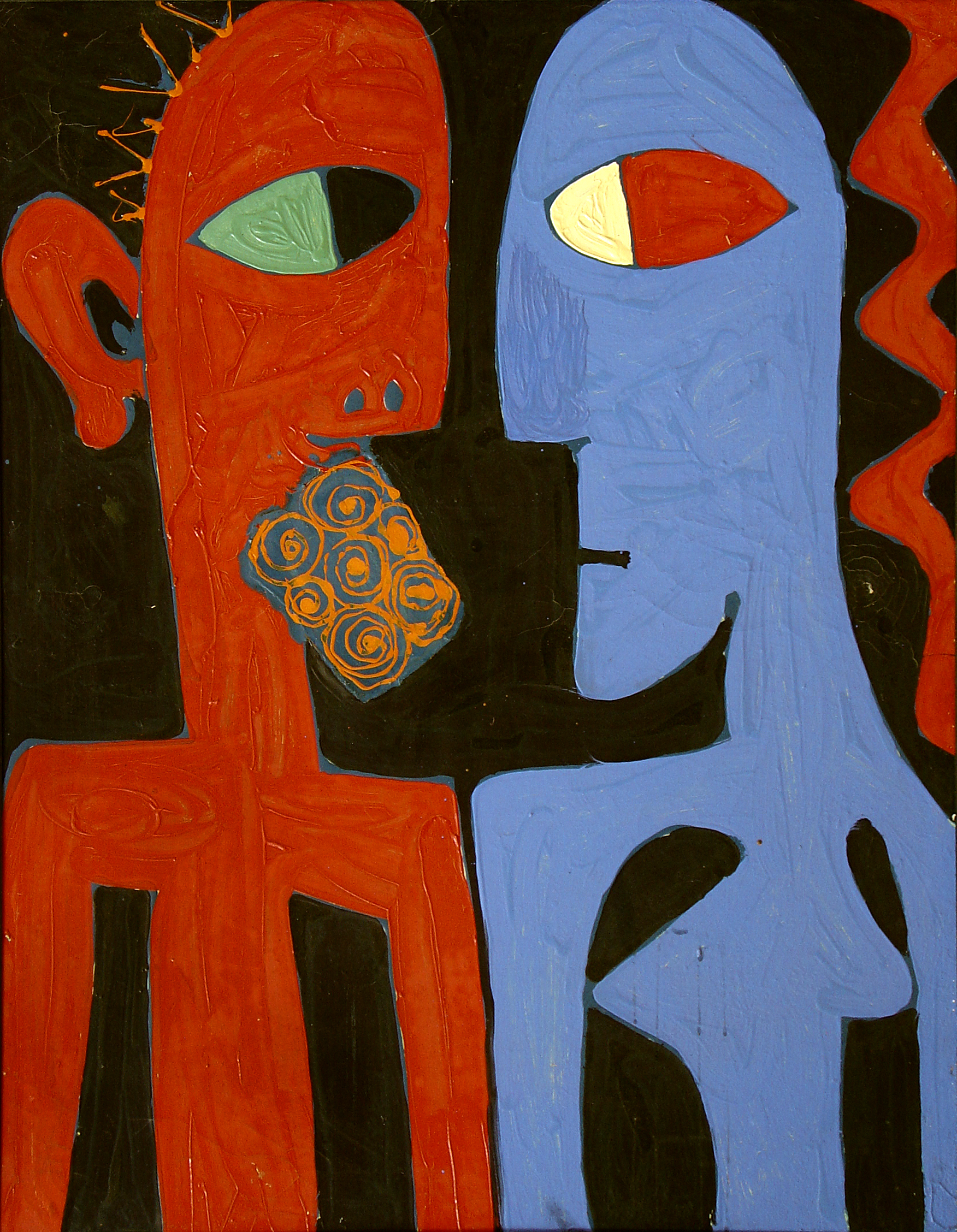
Adam and Eve by Vladimir Sakhnenko, 1979, oil canvas, 75x58

== Deaths ==
- January 12 — Alexander Pekarev (Russian: Пекарев Александр Васильевич), soviet sculptor (b. 1905).
- February 23 — Mikhail Natarevich (Russian: Натаревич Михаил Давидович), soviet painter (b. 1907).

== See also ==
- List of Russian artists
- List of painters of Leningrad Union of Artists
- Saint Petersburg Union of Artists
- Russian culture

== Sources ==
- Всесоюзная художественная выставка «Голубые дороги Родины». Каталог. М., Советский художник, 1979.
- Непринцев Юрий Михайлович. Каталог выставки. К 70-летию со дня рождения и 50-летию творческой деятельности. Л., Искусство, 1979.
- Выставка произведений молодых ленинградских художников "60 лет ВЛКСМ". Каталог. Л., Художник РСФСР, 1982.
- Геворк Вартанович Котьянц. Выставка произведений. Каталог. Л., Художник РСФСР, 1979.
- Георгий Павлович Татарников. Выставка произведений. Каталог. Л., Художник РСФСР, 1979.
- Николай Иванович Костров. Выставка произведений. Каталог. Л., Художник РСФСР, 1979.
- Анна Александровна Кострова. Выставка произведений. Каталог. Л., Художник РСФСР, 1979.
- Белокуров Константин Сергеевич. Выставка произведений. Каталог. Л., Художник РСФСР, 1979.
- Artists of Peoples of the USSR. Biography Dictionary. Vol. 1. Moscow, Iskusstvo, 1970.
- Artists of Peoples of the USSR. Biography Dictionary. Vol. 2. Moscow, Iskusstvo, 1972.
- Directory of Members of Union of Artists of USSR. Volume 1,2. Moscow, Soviet Artist Edition, 1979.
- Directory of Members of the Leningrad branch of the Union of Artists of Russian Federation. Leningrad, Khudozhnik RSFSR, 1980.
- Artists of Peoples of the USSR. Biography Dictionary. Vol. 4 Book 1. Moscow, Iskusstvo, 1983.
- Directory of Members of the Leningrad branch of the Union of Artists of Russian Federation. - Leningrad: Khudozhnik RSFSR, 1987.
- Artists of peoples of the USSR. Biography Dictionary. Vol. 4 Book 2. - Saint Petersburg: Academic project humanitarian agency, 1995.
- Link of Times: 1932 - 1997. Artists - Members of Saint Petersburg Union of Artists of Russia. Exhibition catalogue. - Saint Petersburg: Manezh Central Exhibition Hall, 1997.
- Matthew C. Bown. Dictionary of 20th Century Russian and Soviet Painters 1900-1980s. - London: Izomar, 1998.
- Vern G. Swanson. Soviet Impressionism. - Woodbridge, England: Antique Collectors' Club, 2001.
- Петр Фомин. Живопись. Воспоминания современников. СПб., 2002. С.107.
- Время перемен. Искусство 1960—1985 в Советском Союзе. СПб., Государственный Русский музей, 2006.
- Sergei V. Ivanov. Unknown Socialist Realism. The Leningrad School. - Saint-Petersburg: NP-Print Edition, 2007. - ISBN 5-901724-21-6, ISBN 978-5-901724-21-7.
- Anniversary Directory graduates of Saint Petersburg State Academic Institute of Painting, Sculpture, and Architecture named after Ilya Repin, Russian Academy of Arts. 1915 - 2005. - Saint Petersburg: Pervotsvet Publishing House, 2007.
