= La Vie en Rose (painting) =

1979 painting by Joan Mitchell

La Vie en Rose is a "quadtych", a four panel oil on canvas work by the New York School abstract expressionist painter Joan Mitchell, created in 1979. Named after the 1940s signature song by the French singer and lyricist Edith Piaf, it is in the permanent collection of the Metropolitan Museum of Art, in New York. The work is possessed of black, lavender, pink, and gray passages.

The work was included in the 2021-2022 large scale survey of Mitchell's jointly mounted and respectively exhibited by the San Francisco Museum of Modern Art and the Baltimore Museum of Art. In reviewing the San Francisco showing for The New York Times, Tausif Noir said of the work that in it "Mitchell juxtaposes energetic — nearly violent — sections of black and blue brush strokes against a haze of lavender and pale pink, warping the viewer’s sense of the painting’s scale and directing the eye"....
