= The Partisans (sculpture) =

Sculpture in Boston, Massacuhusetts, U.S.

Coordinates: 42°20′52.5″N 71°2′25.2″W

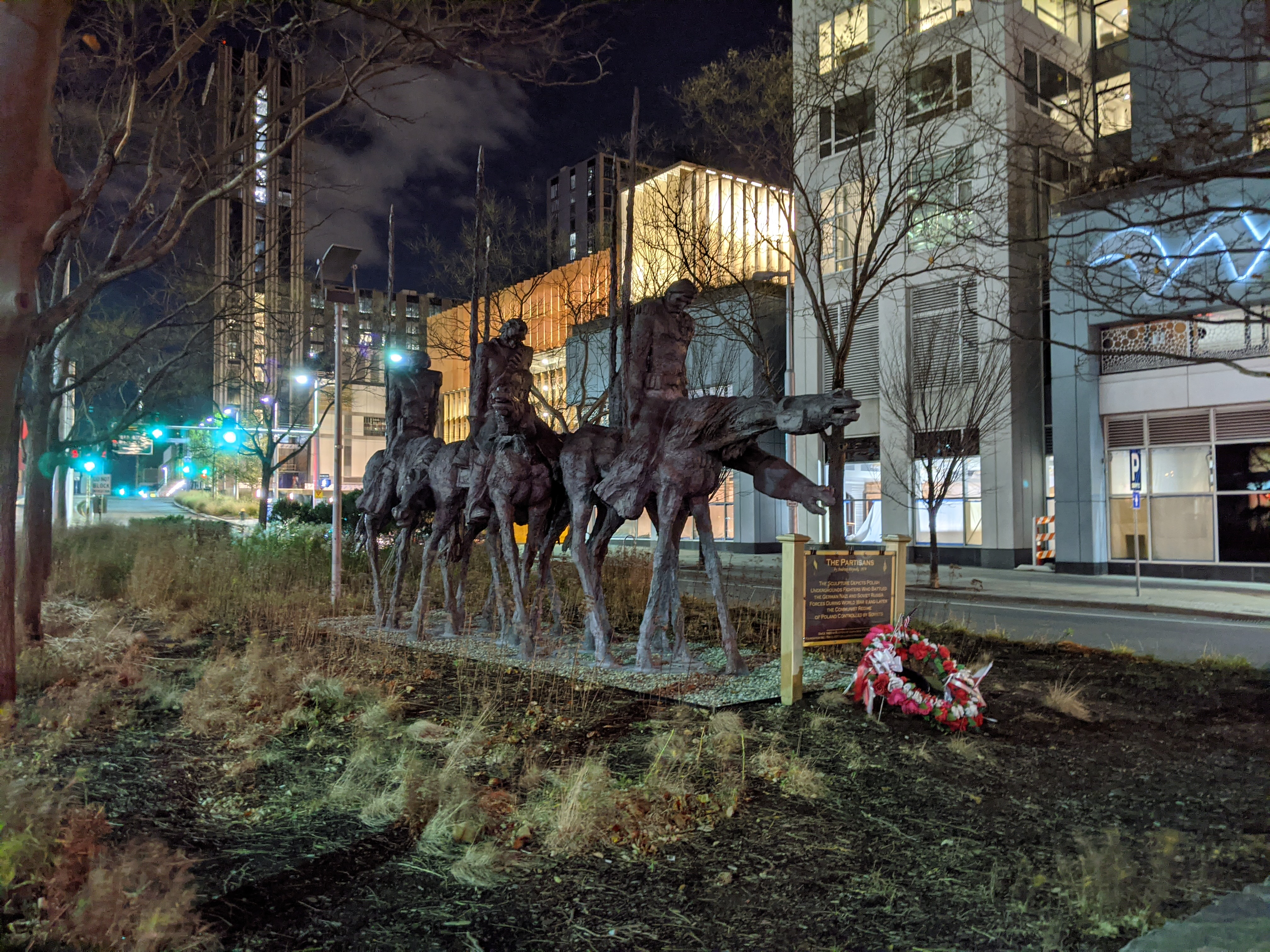
- Artist: Andrzej Pitynski
- Year: 1983
- Type: aluminum
- Dimensions: 7 m × 4 m × 10 m (280 in × 160 in × 390 in)
- Location: Boston, Massachusetts

The Partisans is a 1979 aluminum sculpture by the Polish-American sculptor Andrzej Pitynski that has been exhibited in Boston, Massachusetts, since 1983. The sculpture depicts Polish anti-communist "cursed soldiers". It is dedicated to freedom fighters worldwide.

== Description ==
The sculpture is 10 meters (33 ft) long, 7 m (23 ft) high, and 4 m (13 ft) wide. This modern aluminum sculpture depicts five riders and their horses. The horsemen carry spears on their back, and with their bowed heads the sculpture intends to convey the themes of crucifixion and sacrifice. According to its creator they are intended to represent:

Five armed riders in a marching formation; five desperate men who resemble forest ghosts more than they resemble human beings ... five partisans who are tattered, mortally tired, who are bleeding from endless battles, escapes, skirmishes ... immersed with their own thoughts about the tragedy of their nation, who are riding their horses, stumbling from exhaustion.

The sculpture is a symbolic representation of the cursed soldiers – anti-communist Polish partisans who fought against the Polish communist regime following the communist takeover of Poland in the aftermath of World War II (and not, as some sources erroneously suggest, World War II era anti-Nazi Polish partisans). The sculptor however dedicated his work to "all freedom fighters around the world".

I was creating 'The Partisans' in the United States, when Poland was changing, when the SB was murdering priests, students, and workers. I was creating this monument thinking about them all, about those thousands of the bravest Sons and Daughters of the Polish Nation, who were the first to stand up to the Soviet communism. They were betrayed by world and forgotten by God – a choice they made themselves – in the forest units of: NOW, AK, WiN, NSZ. They fought bravely with NKVD, Soviet Red Army; and with Polish traitors from the UB, KBW, MO, ORMO, [with all] 'consolidators of the people's [communist] regime. They fought because they never reconciled to give up their freedom. [They were] hunted in the forests like wild beasts, they were tortured in the UB dungeons, they were abused with the vindictive pleasure [of their oppressors], they were murdered in the MO torture houses, were buried illicitly at night in the graves that are unknown to this day. It is for THEM, that I created this symbol of the Golgotha of Polish Heroes.

— Andrzej Pitynski

== History ==
Pitynski designed the sculpture in 1979 for the Johnson Atelier – The Technical Institute of Sculpture, with financial support from the Sculpture Foundation. The sculpture was met with a degree of controversy, and Pitynski received threats from the sympathizers of the communist People's Republic of Poland.

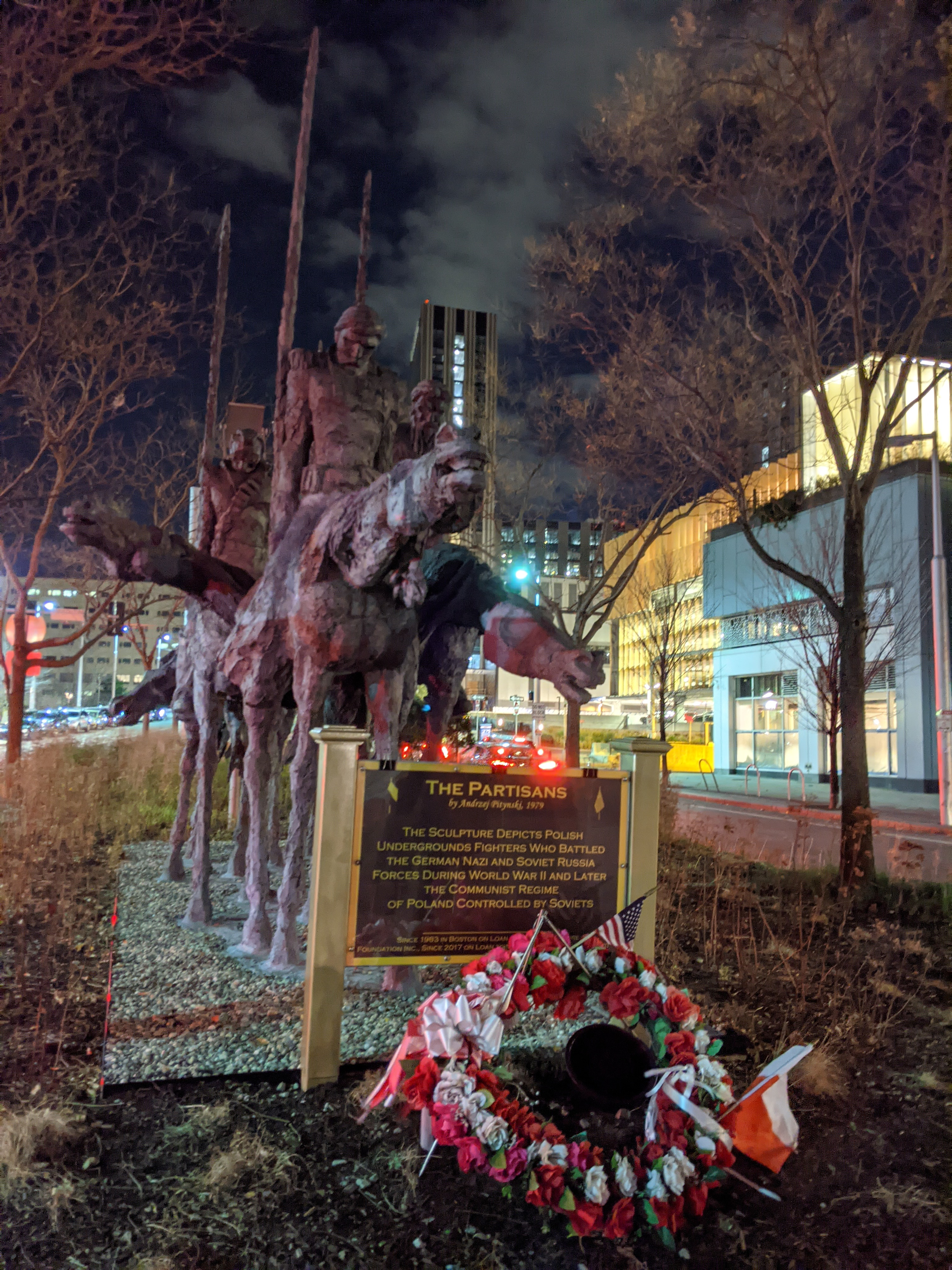
The new home of The Partisians sculpture, as of 2018.

The sculpture has been displayed in Boston since 1983. At first it was given to the city for temporary display, but it has since become a permanent monument. Until January 2006, the statue was located on Boston Common, near the corner of Charles and Beacon streets. City officials cited concerns that the statue lacked a proper pedestal and stored it in a warehouse, which triggered protests from the Polish-American community and from the sculptor himself. In July of that year, the statue was moved to a new public location, thanks to assistance from the Massachusetts Bay Transportation Authority (MBTA). It was located on the South Boston waterfront near the Boston Institute of Contemporary Art and the MBTA's World Trade Center Station on the Silver Line. The statue was rededicated in the presence of the area's Polish American community and of local officials, a gesture endorsed both by Pitynski and by the Polish Consulate in Boston. On November 17, 2018, the statue was permanently relocated to the center median of D Street, at the intersection with Congress Street.
