= Alexander Cvijanović =

Yugoslav-American architect

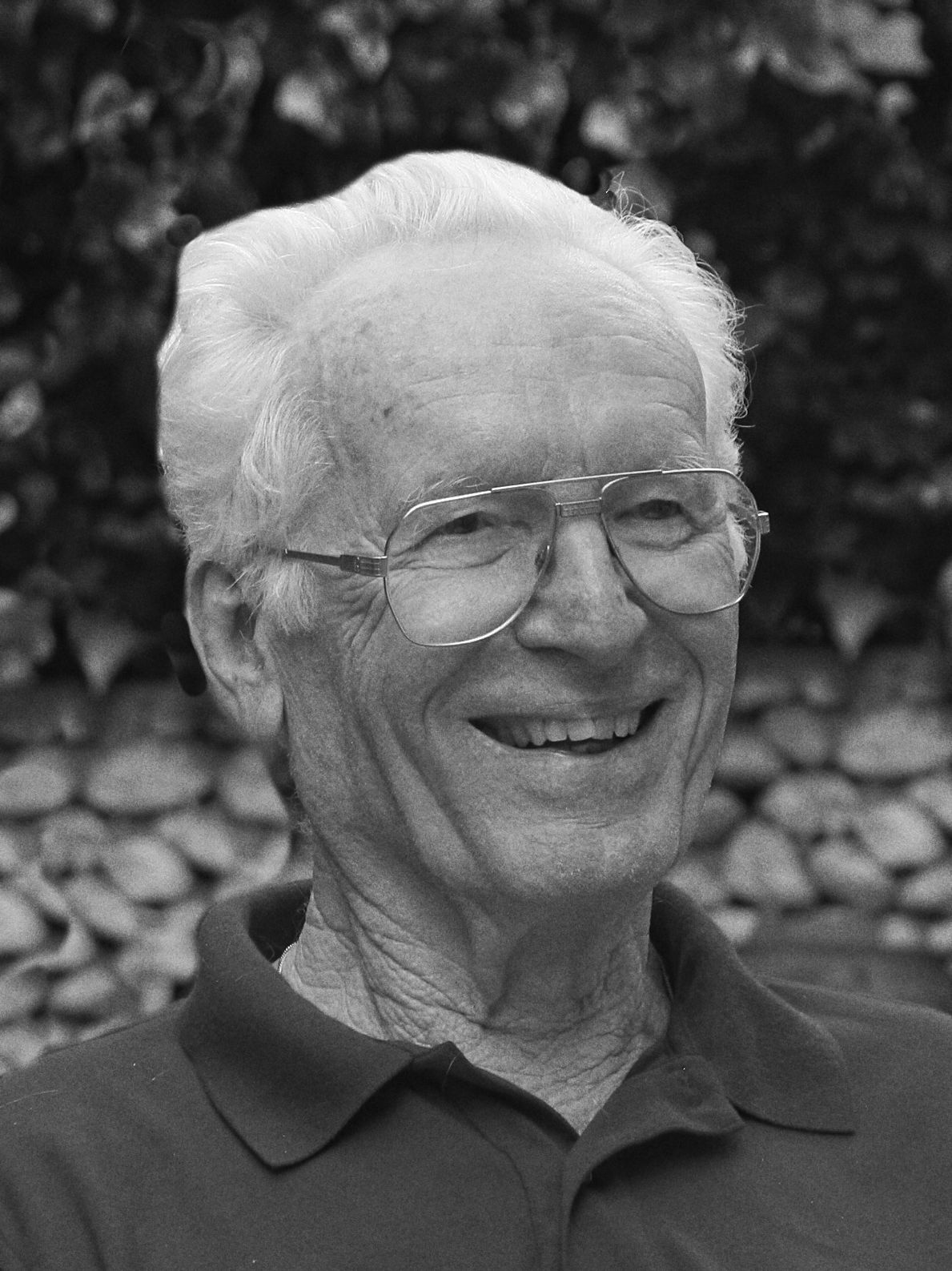
- Born: December 19, 1923; Dalj, Kingdom of Yugoslavia
- Died: May 7, 2019 (aged 95); Boston, Massachusetts, U.S.
- Education: Harvard University
- Occupation: Architect
- Children: Adam; Peter
- Practice: The Architects Collaborative

Alexander Cvijanović (also Alexander/Alex Cvijanovic, Aleksandar Cvijanović; 19 December 1923 – 7 May 2019) was a Yugoslav-American architect. He was a close associate of Walter Gropius and partner of The Architects Collaborative.

== Early life ==
Cvijanović was born into a prosperous Serbian family. His father, Budislav Cvijanović, was a medical doctor and, during the Regency of the 1930s, a government ministerial advisor. Cvijanović started to study conducting at the Academy of Music in Belgrade but his studies were halted by the Second World War. His father was killed by the communists and the family fled socialist Yugoslavia in 1946. Initially, they settled in Paris, where he started studying architecture. After a short while, the family emigrated to the United States, where he secured the Tolstoy Foundation’s scholarship to study architecture at the Harvard Graduate School of Design.

== Career ==
Shortly after graduating from Harvard, Cvijanović joined The Architects Collaborative (TAC), an architectural partnership founded by Walter Gropius and seven younger partners. TAC was renowned for its innovative, collaborative working methods and Cvijanović worked on many of the firm’s iconic projects per below. As they worked closely together, Gropius and Cvijanović formed a bond that went beyond the professional, with Gropius treating his colleague as a substitute son.

Cvijanović spoke several languages, including Russian, Italian, French and German. His knowledge of German and close working relationship with Gropius, as well as his considerable talent, resulted in him working on many TAC projects in Germany.

== Selected projects ==
- 1958-1963 University of Baghdad, Baghdad, Iraq
- 1958-1963 Pan Am Building, New York City, USA
- 1962 Berlin Double School and Children’s Centre, Berlin, Germany
- 1962-75 Gropiusstadt, Neukölln, Berlin, Germany
- 1968-1970 Rosenthal glass factory (known as the "Glass Cathedral"), Amberg, Bavaria, Germany
- 1965 Rosenthal Porcelain Factory; Selb, Bavaria, Germany
- 1975 Jubail Industrial Complex, Jubail, Saudi Arabia
- 1976-1979 The Bauhaus Archive, Berlin, Germany
- 1982-1986 Kuwait Foundation for the Advancement of Sciences, Sharq, Kuwait
- 1984 O'Neill Library, Boston College, Chestnut Hill, Massachusetts, USA
- 1984 Copley Place, Boston, Massachusetts, USA

== Later career and life ==
After the demise of The Architects Collaborative, Cvijanović continued to work internationally (Kuwait, Singapore, Berlin) and in the USA. In 2019, Cvijanović's recollections of working with Gropius and sketches for the projects they undertook together in Bavaria were used to create the virtual reality experience film "Bauhaus in Bavaria".

He lived in Boston with his third wife, Maria, and died on 7 May 2019.

== Gallery ==
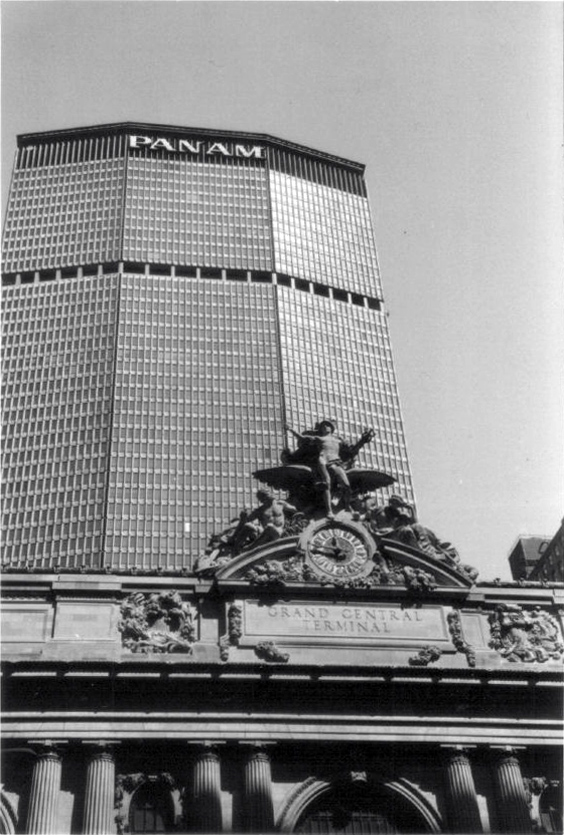
Pan Am building (now the Met Life Building)

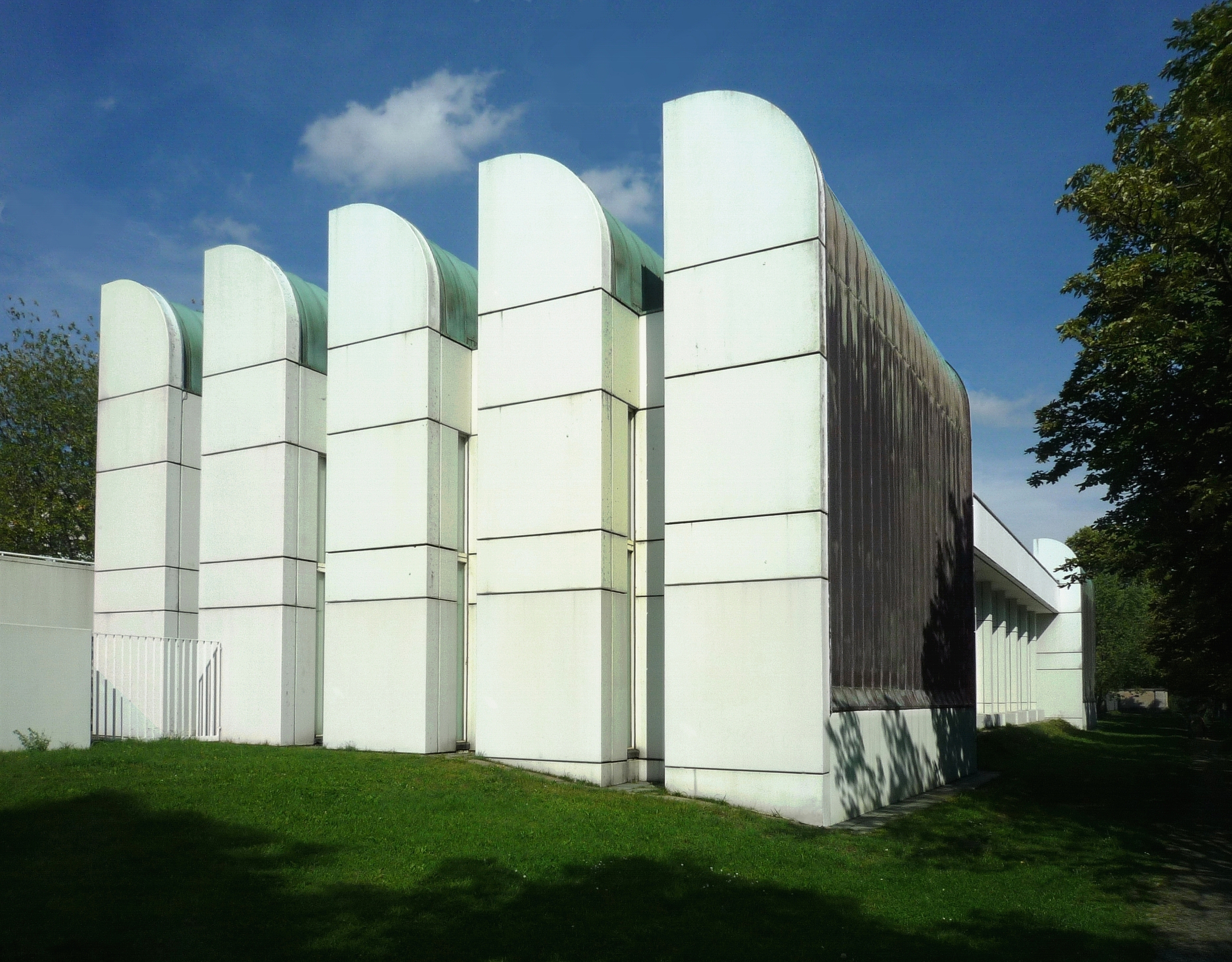
The Bauhaus Archive building in Berlin

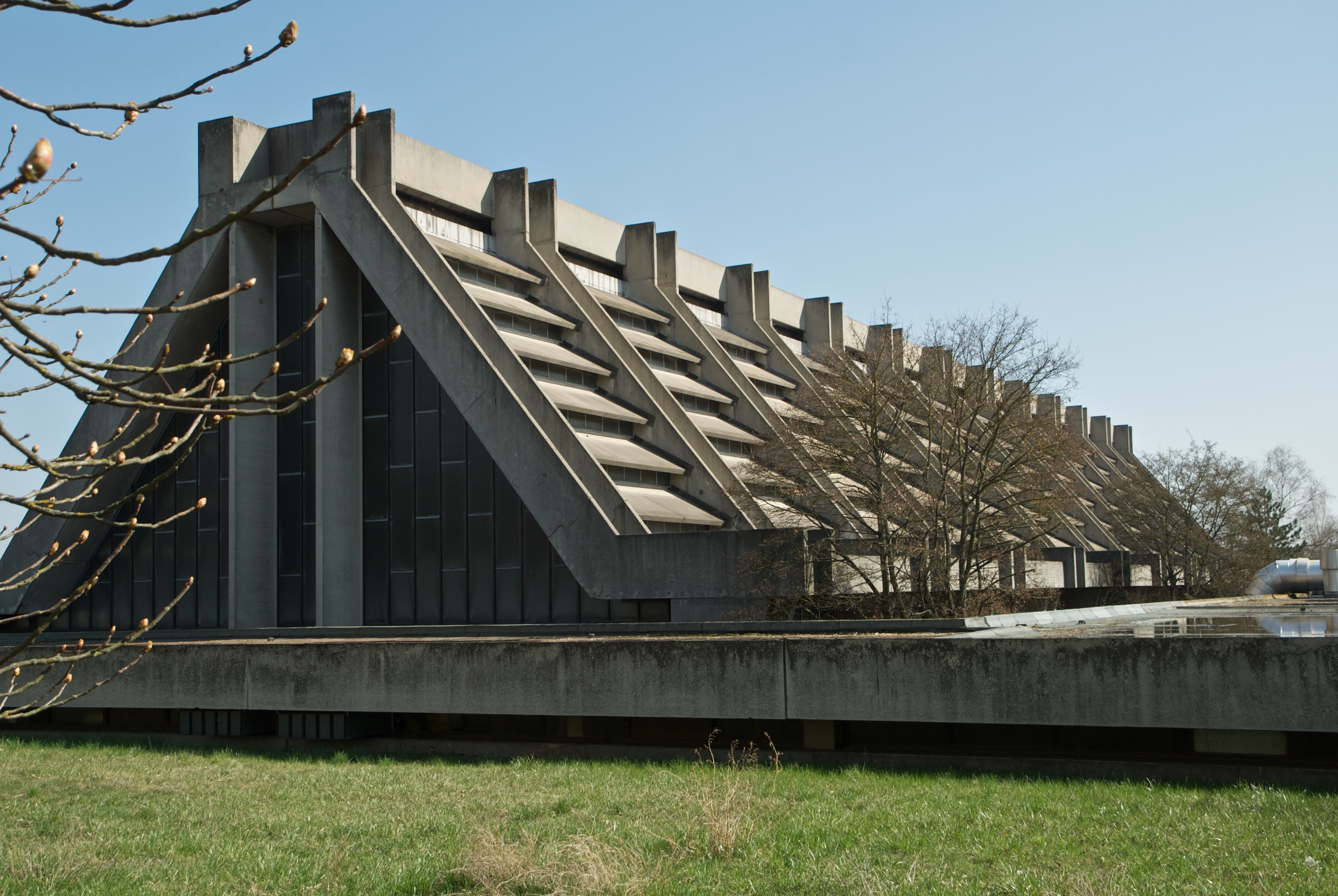
Rosenthal glass factory in Amberg, Germany
