= Bauhaus Archive =

Bauhaus museum and archive in Berlin, Germany

Coordinates: 52°30′22″N 13°21′15″E

- Bauhaus-Archiv
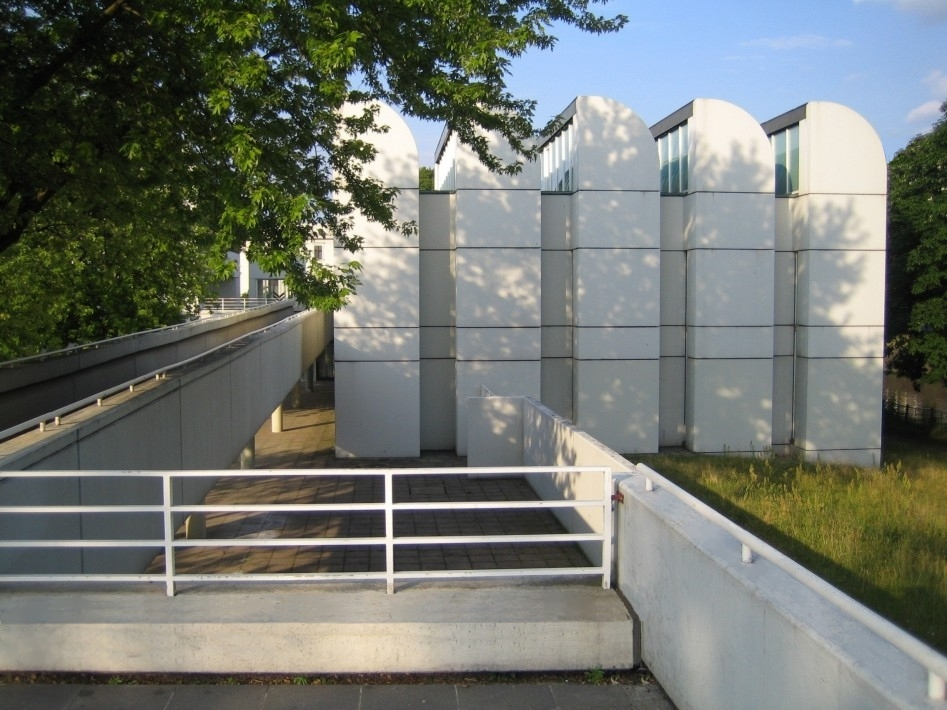
- Bauhaus archive, view from the west
- Established: 1960
- Location: Berlin-Tiergarten
- Type: Design museum
- Website: https://www.bauhaus.de

The Bauhaus Archive (German: Bauhaus-Archiv) is a state archive and a design museum located in Berlin. It displays and collects art pieces, items, documents and literature related to the Bauhaus School (1919–1933). As of 2026, the museum is closed due to construction and is scheduled to reopen in 2027. It has a temporary space at Knesebeckstraße 1 in Charlottenburg.

== History ==
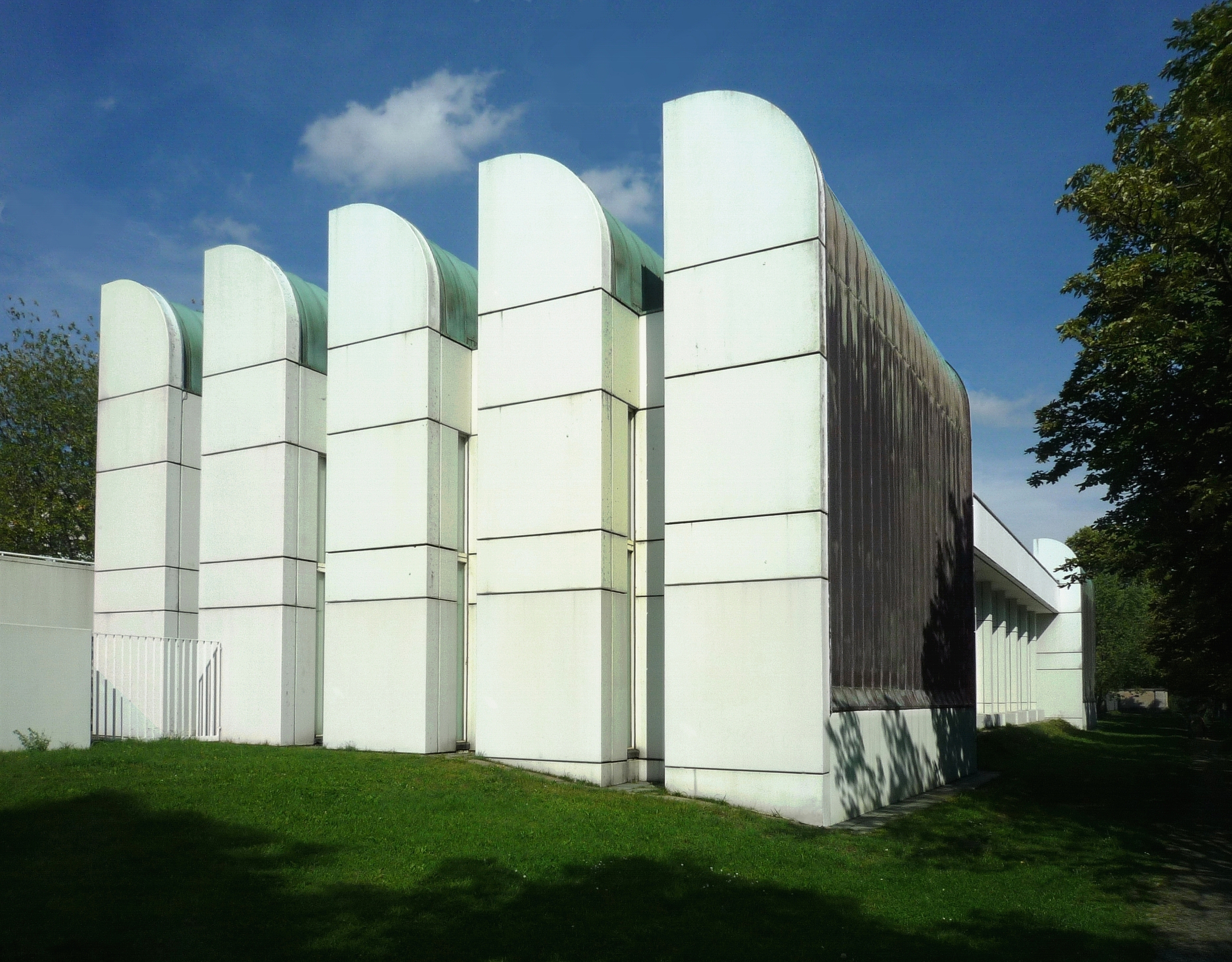
Bauhaus-Archive, view from south west

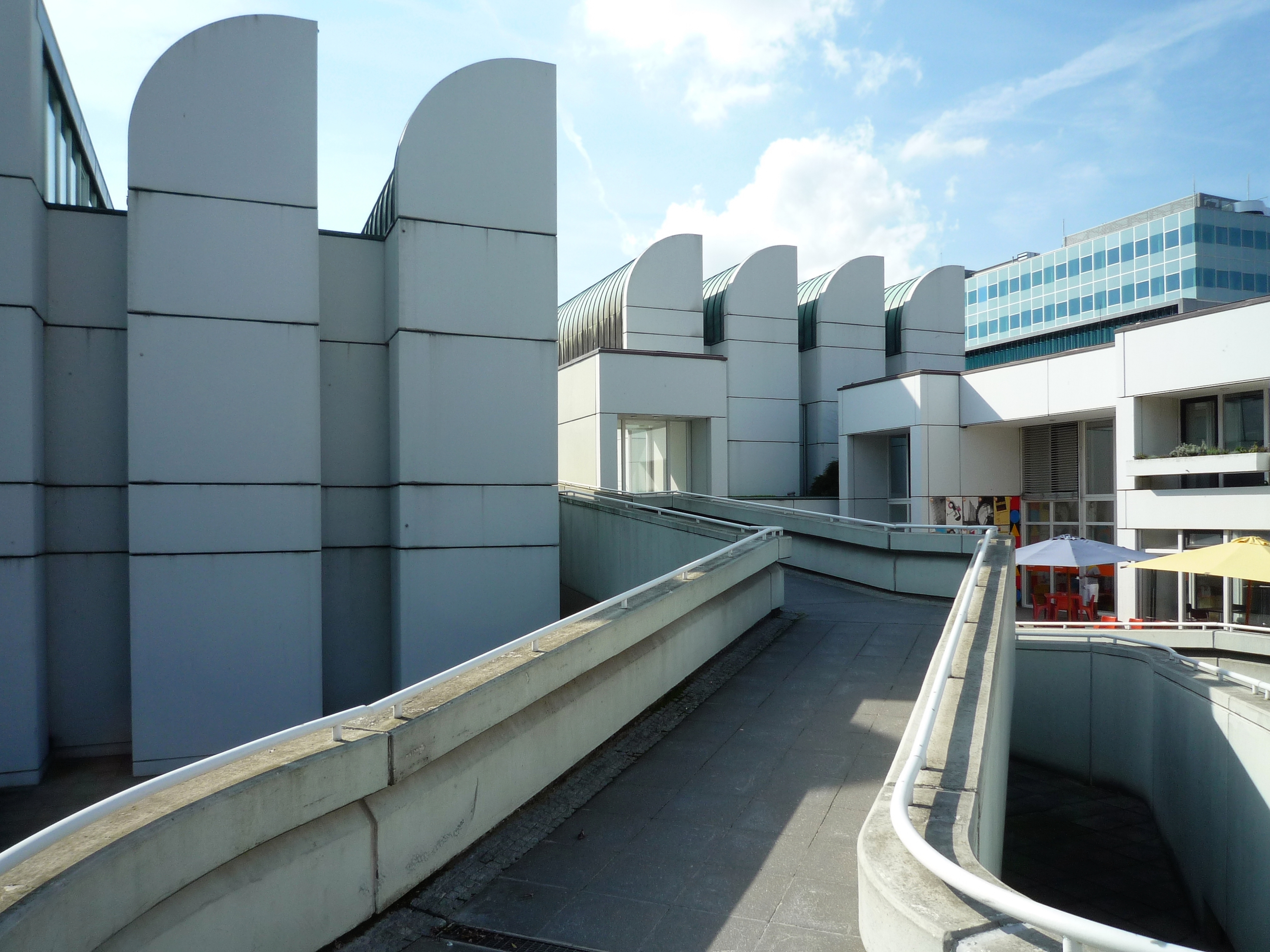
Bauhaus-Archive, view from south east

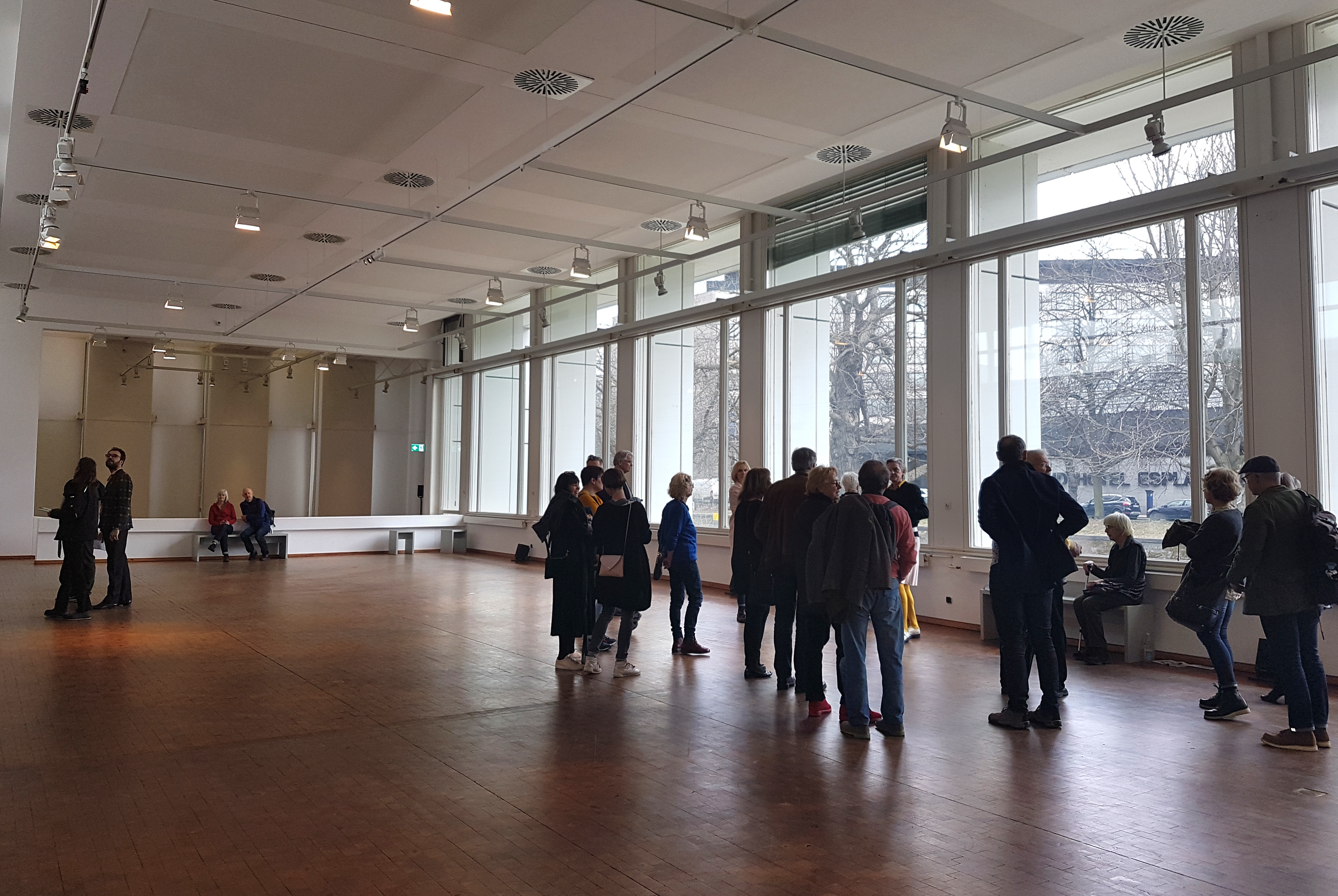
Bauhaus-Archive Berlin, large hall

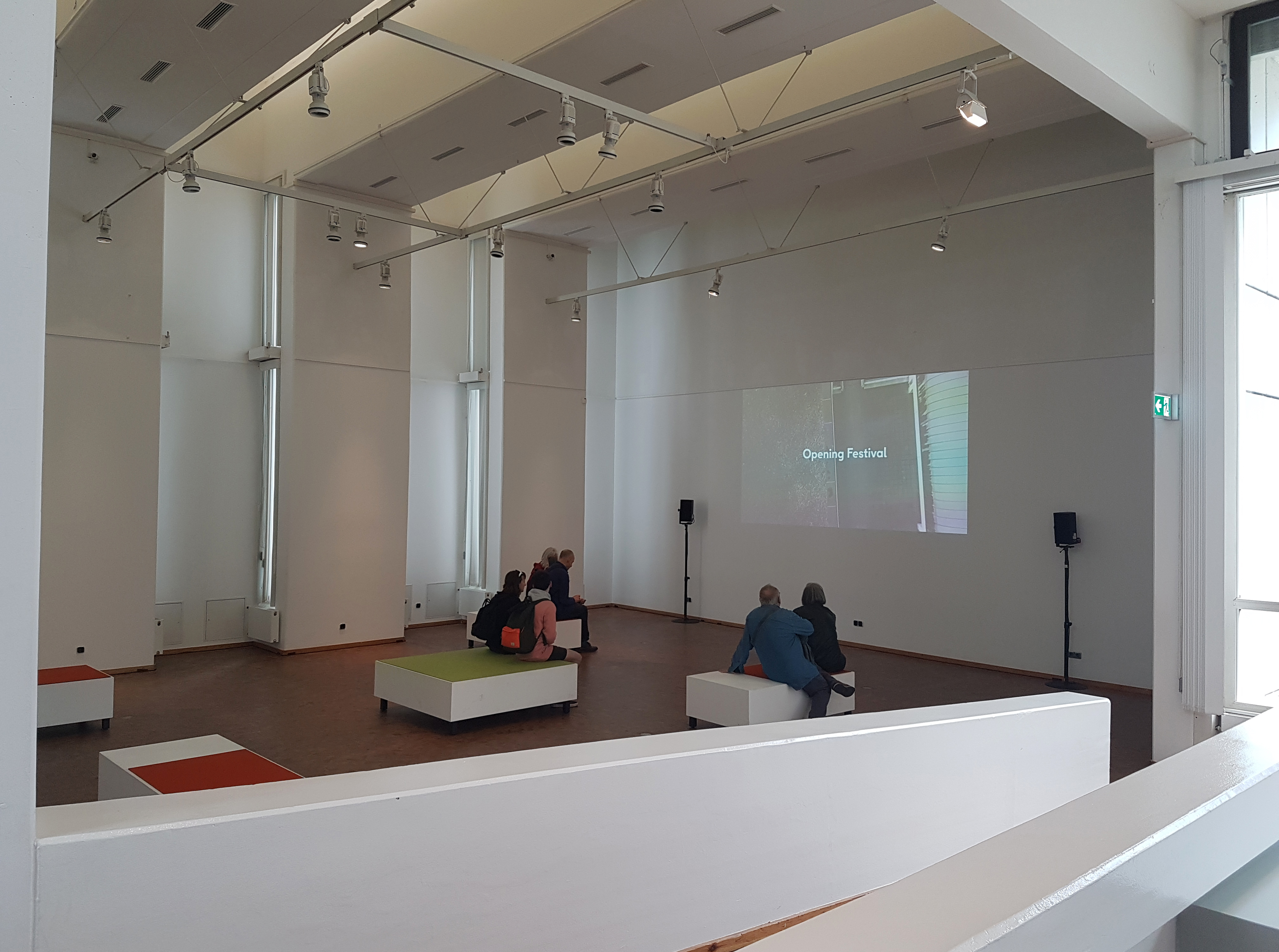
Bauhaus-Archive Berlin, space left of hall

The Bauhaus Archive was founded by art historian Hans Maria Wingler in Darmstadt in 1960 with support from the School's founder Walter Gropius and other members of the Bauhaus movement. The Archive's collection was initially housed at the Ernst Ludwig Building but grew so quickly that a dedicated museum was needed soon. Gropius was asked to design it. In 1964, he produced plans for a new museum in Darmstadt, on the Rosenhöhe, which was not realized because of the local politics.

The Senate of Berlin was however ready to supply both space and money for the project. In 1971 the Bauhaus Archive moved to temporary accommodation in Berlin. Modifying the plans for the location beside the Landwehrkanal, political decisions and financial restrictions delayed things. The foundation stone was finally laid in 1976 and the building was ready by 1979. Gropius' original 1964 design was significantly altered by then, apart from the recognizable silhouette of the semicircular fin-like saw-tooth shed roofs. The necessary changes to the plan were carried out by his former colleague Alex Cvijanović, in conjunction with the Berlin architect Hans Bandel.

In 1997 a conservation order was placed on the building. In 2005 it served as an outdoor set for the science fiction action films V for Vendetta and Æon Flux.

As the museum space only permitted to display 35 percent of the museum's collection, the Bauhaus Archive invited six architectural firms to participate in a co-operative competition to expand the Archive, including Diener & Diener (Basel), Nägeli Architekten (Berlin), SANAA (Tokyo), Sauerbruch & Hutton (Berlin), UN Studio (Amsterdam), Volker Staab (Berlin). In 2005, the jury chaired by Wolfgang Lorch of Saarbrücken awarded the design to the Japanese firm SANAA. However in 2009, the Berlin Senate abandoned the extension plans. In 2015, Berlin-based Staab Architekten was selected as the winner of a new competition for a 6,700-square-metre extension. Originally scheduled to be completed in 2022, the work is ongoing as of 2026.

== Collection ==
The collection documents the history of Bauhaus in art, teaching, architecture and design. It includes teaching materials, workshop models, architectural plans and models, photographs, documents and a library.

The Bauhaus Archive includes works by Lyonel Feininger, Johannes Itten, Paul Klee, Wassily Kandinsky, László Moholy-Nagy, Werner Drewes, Gunta Stölzl and Oskar Schlemmer. The comprehensive graphic collection includes drawings, watercolours and prints.

== Activities ==
Apart from a permanent exhibition, about four special exhibitions are mounted each year. There are also lectures, workshops and discussions, sculpture yard exhibitions, readings and concerts.

The Bauhaus Archive in Berlin has long held the only official Bauhaus trademark label to reproduce a limited number of Bauhaus designs.

In 2019, the Archive celebrated the Bauhaus centenary examining legacy and influence of the school under the tagline “Rethinking the World”, alongside the Bauhaus Dessau Foundation and the Klassik Stiftung Weimar (Bauhaus Cooperation). They held a festival at the Academy of Arts in Berlin and an anniversary exhibition titled "Original Bauhaus" at the Berlinische Galerie. This exhibition presented around 1,000 original Bauhaus works and attracted over 130,000 visitors, becoming the most-attended exhibition in museum's history.

== See also ==
- List of design museums
