= Bonnie Bronson =

American painter and sculptor

- Born: March 9, 1940; Portland, Oregon
- Died: August 4, 1990 (aged 50); Mount Adams, Washington
- Spouse: Lee Kelly (m. 1961–1990)
- Children: 1
- Website: bonniebronsonart.com

Bonnie Jean Bronson (March 9, 1940 – August 4, 1990) was an American painter and sculptor and one of Portland, Oregon's most prominent artists during the 1970s and 1980s. Randal Davis said that her work showed "an abiding love for the sheer beauty of materials and a fascination with unusual structures and systems."

== Early life and education ==
Bronson was born in Portland in 1940, the daughter of Dave Grayson Bronson and Mary Estelle Hill Bronson. Her father served in the United States Air Force during World War II. Her parents divorced in 1947, and both parents remarried before 1950. Bronson attended the University of Kansas, the University of Oregon, and the Portland Art Museum School.

== Career ==
Bronson made paintings, drawings, tapestries, and sculptures from steel, chrome, enamel, wood, and corrugated cardboard. In 1964 she was part of a four-person show at the Portland Art Museum. She received an Oregon Arts Commission fellowship in 1978. "In the past eight years her forte has been the sensitive deployment of modular units and repeated shapes to create abstract, nonfigural constructions," noted the Oregon Journal's art editor of her solo exhibit at the Portland Art Museum in 1979.

== Works ==
- "Untitled (Cream)" (1963 painting)
- Tree of Life (1964, with Lee Kelly)
- "Nature Study Part II" (1971, oil on wood diptych)
- "Green Knees" (1973, enamel on steel panel)
- Leland I (1975, with Lee Kelly)
- "Streak O Lightning" (1978, cardboard)
- "Grandma's Dream" (cardboard)
- "Jas #1" (1979, acid etched steel)
- "Brawn" and "Variable Split" (1979, cardboard)
- "Chac" (series of wood wall reliefs)
- Kassandra (1980) a 10-by-24-foot bas relief described as "an impressive sculptural slap in the face" made of cardboard (destroyed, reconstructed in 2011)

== Personal life and legacy ==
Bronson married widowed sculptor Lee Kelly in 1961. After their Portland home and studio were heavily damaged in the Columbus Day Storm of 1962, Kelly and Bronson purchased a former dairy farm outside of Oregon City, where they spent the rest of their lives. Their son Jason died from leukemia in 1978. They also raised Kassandra, Kelly's daughter from his first marriage. In 1990, Bronson died at age 50, in a mountaineering accident on Mazama Glacier on Mount Adams, Washington.

An award in her name, the Bonnie Bronson Fellowship, is presented to one Pacific Northwest artist each year. In 1993 the Portland Art Museum held a retrospective exhibit of works by Bronson. In 2011 a citywide exhibition of works by Bronson and Bronson fellows was mounted at Reed College, Portland Art Museum, Portland Northwest College of Art, Lewis & Clark College, and several private galleries.
