= Lee Kelly =

American sculptor (1932–2022)

- Born: May 24, 1932; McCall, Idaho, U.S.
- Died: March 28, 2022 (aged 89); Clackamas County, Oregon, U.S.
- Known for: Sculpture & Art
- Spouses: Jeanette Bernhardt (m. 1950; died 1960) Bonnie Bronson (m. 1961; died 1990)
- Children: 2
- Website: web.archive.org/web/20220919132606/http://www.lee-kelly.net/

Lee Kelly (May 24, 1932 – March 28, 2022) was an American sculptor who has more than 30 sculptures on display between Eugene, Oregon, and Vancouver, Washington. Kelly has been called "Oregon's sculptor".

== Personal life ==
Born in rural McCall in central Idaho, Kelly was raised near Riggins, Idaho. His family moved to Portland in 1945 and he attended Roosevelt High School. From 1949 to 1951, he attended Vanport Extension Center, which is now Portland State University. From 1951 to 1955, he was in the United States Air Force Reserves at Portland Air Force Base, including service on active duty. He married Jeanette Bernhardt. During the late 1950s he attended Pacific Northwest College of Art in Portland, Oregon. From 1967 to 1971, he taught at Mt. Angel College, Mt. Angel, Oregon. Bernhardt and Kelly had one daughter Kassandra, and Bernhardt died in 1960 of cancer before Kassandra turned one.

In 1961, Kelly married Bonnie Bronson, and in 1963 they bought a 5-acre (2.0 ha) dairy farm near Oregon City, where as of 2010 Kelly still lived. Kelly and Bronson had a son, Jason, who died in 1978 of leukemia, while Bronson died while climbing Mount Adams with Kelly in 1990. Subsequently, Kelly partnered for the next three decades with Oregon's trailblazing lawyer, mediator, community leader, and philanthropist, Susan Hammer, until her death from cancer in August 2020.

Lee Kelly died at his home in Clackamas County on March 28, 2022.

== Professional Work ==
As one of the most revered artists in the Pacific Northwest, Lee Kelly is best known for his monumental public sculptures throughout Oregon and the surrounding region. In 1959, after Kelly graduated from the Museum Art School at the Portland Art Museum (now known as the Pacific Northwest College of Art, PNCA), he began a long, prestigious career resulting in a significant body of work. His work can be found in public and private collections throughout the country, including the Portland Art Museum (Portland, OR), Stanford University (Palo Alto, CA), New Orleans Art Museum (New Orleans, LA), Seattle Art Museum (Seattle, WA) and the City of Sapporo, Japan. As one of the most recognized artists in the Northwest, Kelly's modernist sculptures are a central focus at regional institutions such as Reed College, Oregon State University, Catlin Gabel School, the Oregon Health and Sciences University and the Washington Park Rose Garden. In 2012, one of his most significant works, Memory 99, was installed in Portland's North Park blocks, at the new home of PNCA. Kelly's work has been represented at the Elizabeth Leach Gallery since the early 1980s, some of which can be seen in their gallery in Portland. In 2010, Kelly was the subject of a major career retrospective at the Portland Art Museum.

== Select Awards ==
- Oregon Arts Commission's Individual Artist Fellowship, 1985.
- Oregon Governor's Arts Award, 1987.
- Washington State Arts Commission's Artist Trust Grant.
- Lifetime Achievement Award from the Portland Art Museum, 2010.
- Architecture Foundation of Oregon Honored Citizen Award, 2016.

== See also ==
- List of works by Lee Kelly
