= Washington Capitol =

Washington Capitol may refer to:

- Washington State Capitol in Olympia, Washington, United States
- United States Capitol in Washington, District of Columbia, United States
- Washington Capitols, Basketball Association of America team based in Washington, D.C.

== See also ==
- Washington Capitals
