= Medal of Honor Memorial =

There are several memorials to recipients of the Medal of Honor:

- African-American Medal of Honor Recipients Memorial
- Hershel Woody Williams National Medal of Honor Monument, Washington, D.C. (planned)
- Kentucky Medal of Honor Memorial
- Medal of Honor Memorial (Indianapolis)
- Medal of Honor Memorial (Olympia, Washington)
- Medal of Honor Memorial, Riverside National Cemetery
- Medal of Honor Grove, Valley Forge, Pennsylvania
- Oregon Veterans Medal of Honor Memorial
- Texas Medal of Honor Memorial
- National Medal of Honor Museum
