= Tivoli Fountain (Olympia, Washington) =

Fountain in Olympia, Washington, U.S.

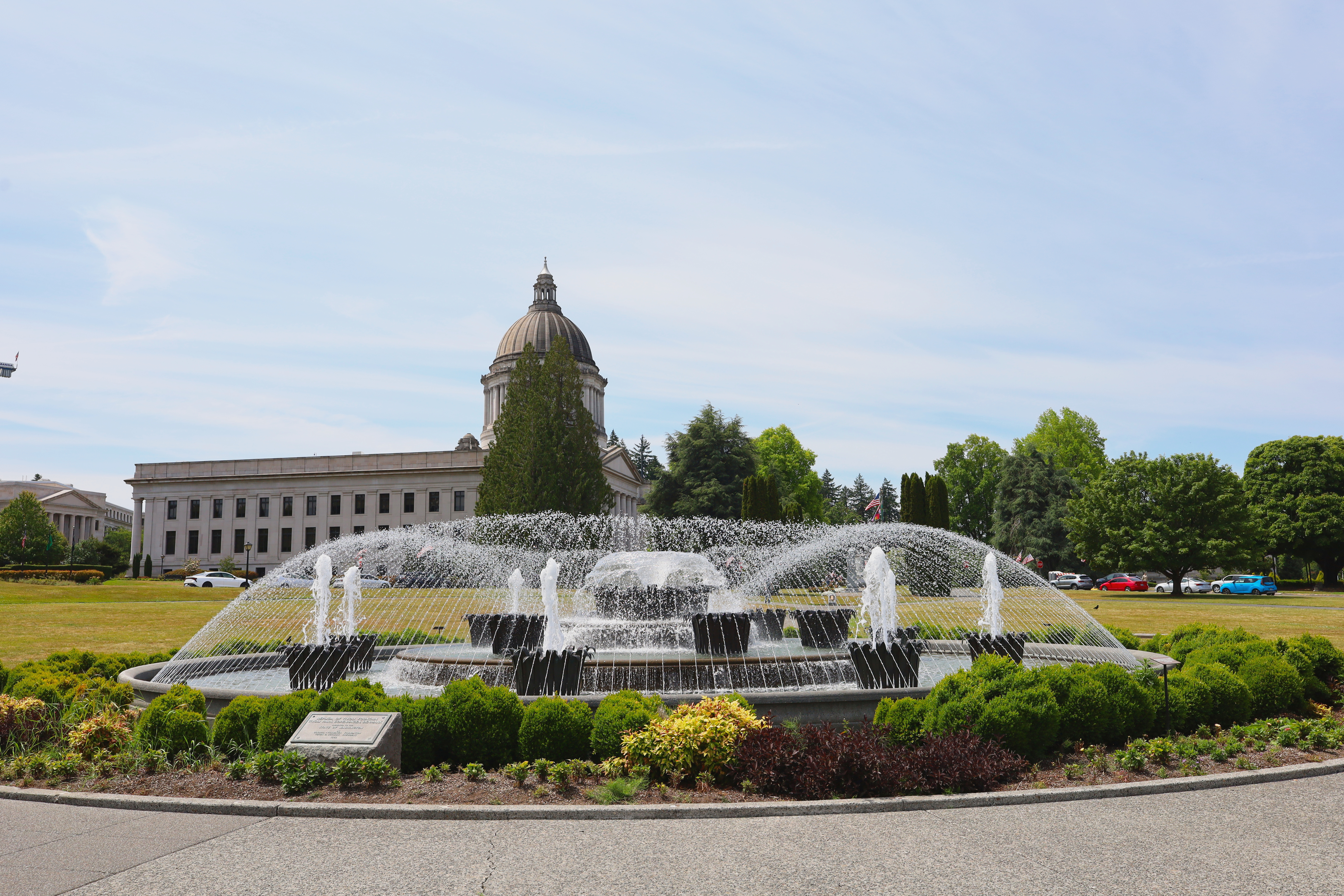
- Fountain in June 2025
- Interactive map of Fountain location
- Completion date: 15 April 1953
- Dimensions: 50 feet (15 m) in diameter
- Location: Olympia, Washington, U.S.
- 47°02′11″N 122°54′06″W
- Owner: Washington State Department of Enterprise Services
- Website: Washington State Campus - Tivoli Fountain

The Tivoli Fountain is installed on the Washington State Capitol campus in Olympia, Washington, United States.

It is a replica of a Roman-style fountain in Tivoli Gardens in Copenhagen, Denmark, which itself was inspired by fountains of Villa d’Este in the Italian Renaissance garden style.

== Details ==
The fountain is made of cement and features tulip-shaped copper tubs, 540 water jets which form an umbrella shape, and a large central spout shooting water 25 feet upward. All together, the fountain circulates 600 gallons of water per minute.

A plaque on the east side of the fountain is inscribed with:

Replica of the Tivoli Fountain
Tivoli Park, Copenhagen, Denmark
Presented to the
State of Washington
by
Olympia-Tumwater Foundation
Peter G. Schmidt, President
1953

== History ==
The fountain was dedicated on April 15, 1953, by Governor Arthur B. Langlie.

In 2017, the fountain underwent a restoration and modernization project, which resulted in a reduction of water usage by 32%.

On September 16, 2024, the fountain was shut off to repair a water leak through the concrete basin. The fountain was reopened on September 25.
