= The Shaman (Hansen) =

Sculpture in Olympia, Washington, U.S.

- Artist: James Lee Hansen
- Location: Olympia, Washington, U.S.
- 47°02′05″N 122°53′50″W

The Shaman is a bronze sculpture by James Lee Hansen, installed on the Washington State Capitol campus in Olympia, Washington, United States. The artwork was dedicated on October 8, 1971.
