= Woman Dancing =

Sculpture in Olympia, Washington, U.S.

- Artist: Phillip Levine
- Medium: Bronze sculpture
- Location: Olympia, Washington, U.S.
- 47°02′11″N 122°53′55″W

Woman Dancing is an 8-foot (2.4 m) tall, 450-pound bronze sculpture of a woman by Phillip Levine, installed on the Washington State Capitol campus in Olympia, Washington, United States. The statue was dedicated on February 7, 1976.
