= Law Enforcement Memorial (Olympia, Washington) =

Memorial in Olympia, Washington, U.S.

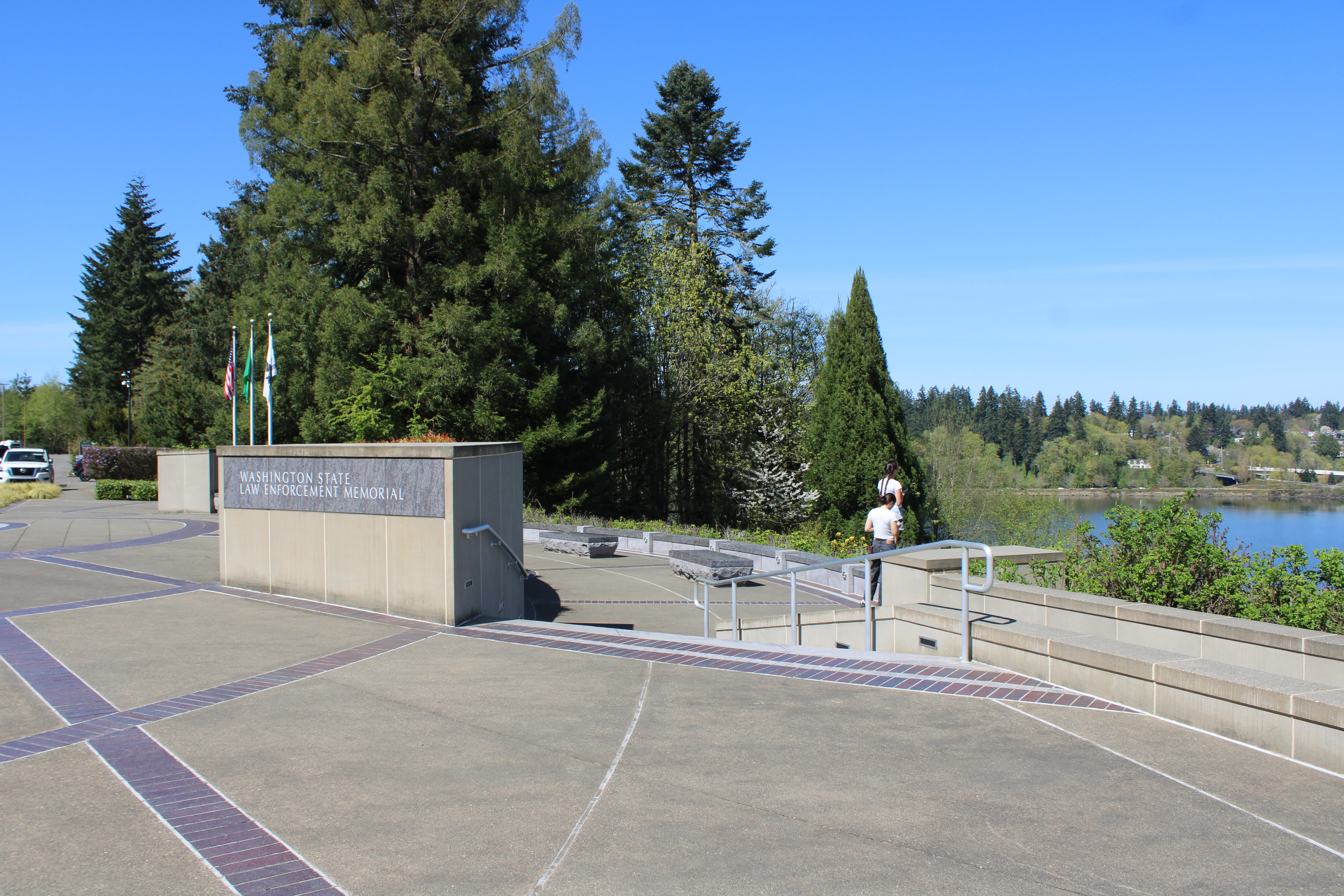
- Memorial in April 2025
- Interactive map of Law Enforcement Memorial
- Location: Washington State Capitol in Olympia, Washington
- Coordinates: 47°02′15″N 122°54′17″W
- Designer: John Swanson
- Type: Memorial
- Dedicated date: May 19, 2006

The Law Enforcement Memorial is installed on the Washington State Capitol campus in Olympia, Washington, United States. The memorial was designed by John Swanson and dedicated on May 19, 2006.
