= World War II Memorial (Olympia, Washington) =

War memorial in Olympia, Washington, U.S.

- United States of America
- For Second World War
- Unveiled: May 28, 1999
- Location: 47°02′16″N 122°54′07″W; Olympia, Washington
- Designed by: Simon Kogan

The World War II Memorial by artist Simon Kogan is installed on the Washington State Capitol campus in Olympia, Washington, United States. The memorial, dedicated on May 28, 1999, is made of bronze, melted torpedo railings, granite, and stone.
