= POW–MIA Memorial (Olympia, Washington) =

Memorial on the Washington State Capitol campus

- United States
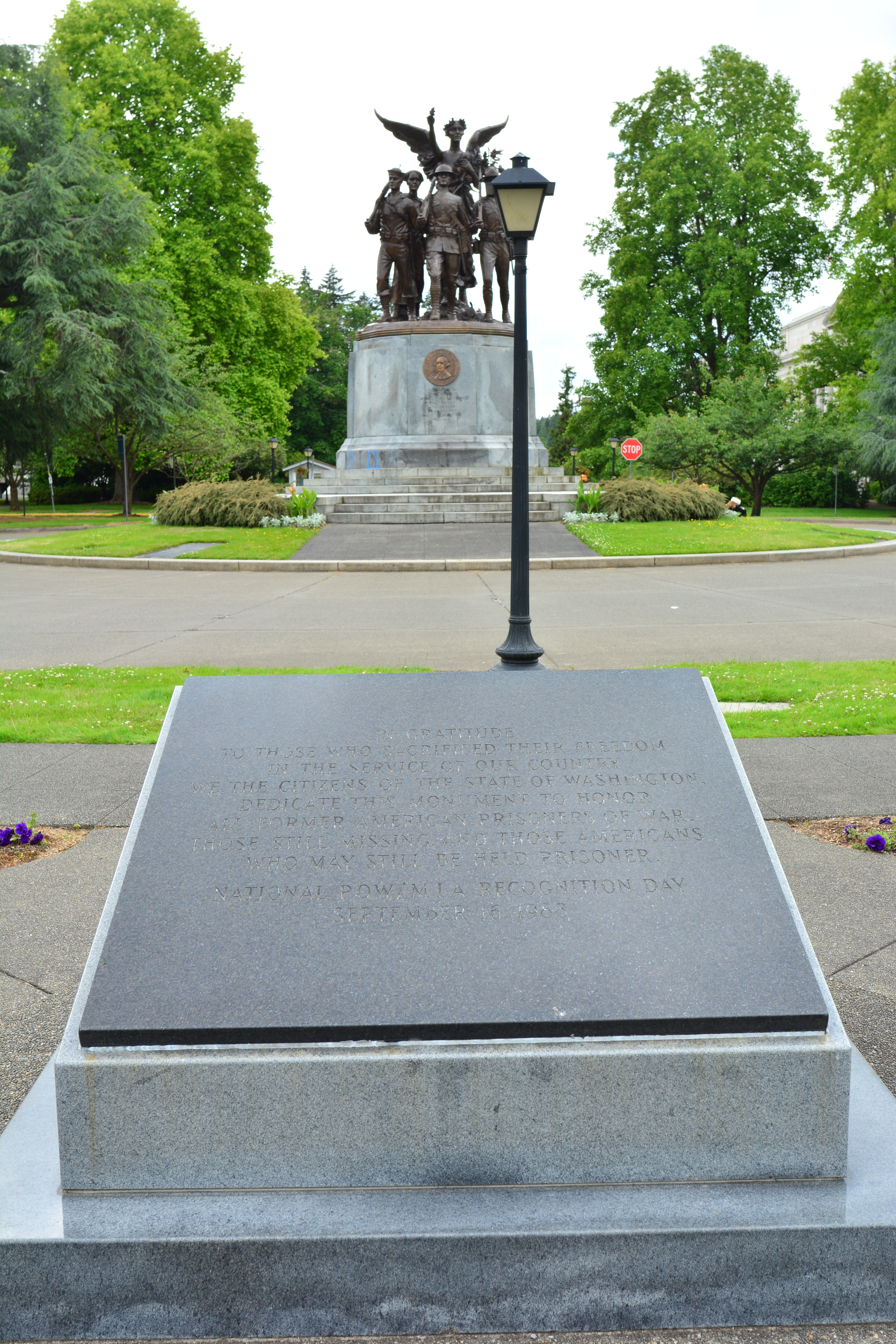
- POW-MIA plaque, foreground, and Winged Victory in the background
- For Prisoners of war and people missing in action
- Established: November 11, 1982
- Location: 47.036561°N 122.902950°W; Washington State Capitol near Olympia, Washington

The POW–MIA Memorial is installed on the Washington State Capitol campus in Olympia, Washington, United States. The marble and granite memorial was originally dedicated as the Vietnam Veterans Memorial on November 11, 1982, and later rededicated to commemorate prisoners of war (POW) and people missing in action (MIA) on September 16, 1988 (National POW/MIA Recognition Day).
