= Water Garden (Olympia, Washington) =

Water feature in Olympia, Washington, U.S.

- Location: Olympia, Washington, U.S.
- Location within Washington (state)
- Coordinates: 47°02′06″N 122°53′57″W

The Water Garden by Lawrence Halprin is located on the Washington State Capitol campus in Olympia, Washington, United States. The interactive water feature was installed in 1972.
