= Territorial Sundial =

Sculpture in Olympia, Washington, U.S.

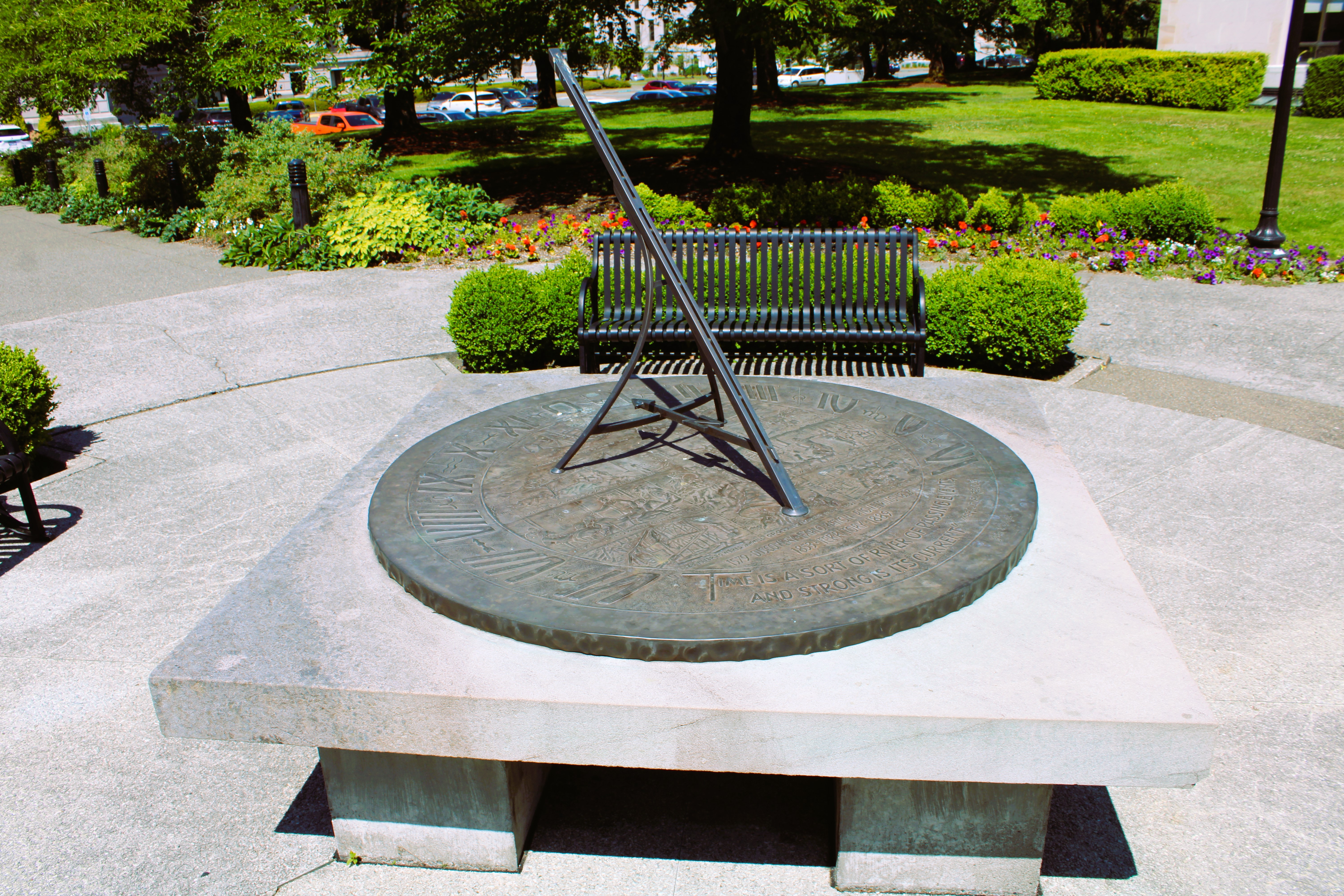
- Sundial in 2023
- Interactive map of Sundial location
- Artist: John W. Elliot
- Year: 1959
- Medium: Brass and Wilkeson sandstone
- Dimensions: 6 feet (1.8 m) in diameter
- Location: Washington State Capitol, Olympia, Washington
- 47°02′05″N 122°54′17″W

The Territorial Sundial by John William Elliot is installed on the Washington State Capitol campus in Olympia, Washington, United States. Dedicated on January 23, 1959, the sundial is made of brass and Wilkeson sandstone, with bronze rods.
