= Washington State Capitol =

State capitol building of the U.S. state of Washington

- Washington State Capitol Historic District
- U.S. National Register of Historic Places
- U.S. Historic district
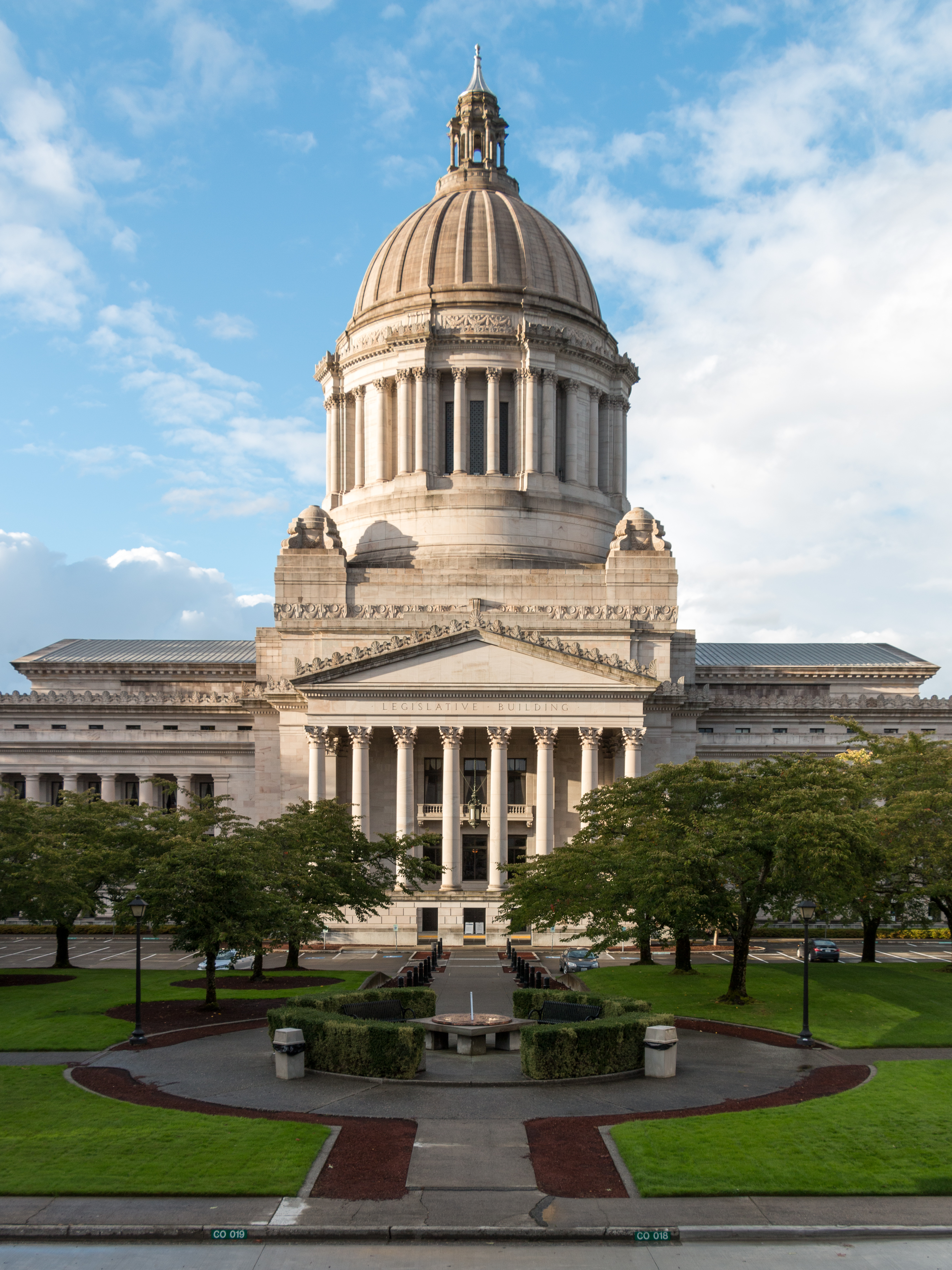
- Interactive map of Washington State Capitol Historic District
- Location: 416 Sid Snyder Avenue SW, Olympia, Washington 98504
- Coordinates: 47°02′09″N 122°54′17″W
- Area: 143 acres (580,000 m^{2})
- Built: 1928; 98 years ago
- Architect: Walter R. Wilder, Harry K. White
- Architectural style: American neoclassic
- Visitation: 50,000 (2025)
- NRHP reference No.: 79002564
- Added to NRHP: June 22, 1979

The Washington State Capitol (or "Legislative Building") in Olympia is the home of the government of the state of Washington. It contains the chambers of the Washington State Legislature, offices for the governor, lieutenant governor, secretary of state, and state treasurer. It is part of a larger administrative campus including buildings for the Washington Supreme Court, the Washington Governor's Mansion, and many other state agencies. It is owned and operated by the Department of Enterprise Services (DES).

Olympia was chosen as the territorial capital in 1853 and a two-story building was constructed for use by the legislature beginning the following year. A permanent capitol building was planned following statehood in 1889, but construction stalled amid poor economic conditions. The state government moved to the existing county courthouse in Olympia in 1905, but it proved to be too small for the state's needs. Design of the permanent capitol resumed in 1911 and construction began the following year. The Legislative Building opened in 1928 and features a monumental dome.

The Capitol Campus was placed on the National Register of Historic Districts in 1974 and contains or contributes to some of the most valued views in the state, including the Olympic Mountains, Puget Sound, Mt. Rainier, the Capitol Dome and the Capitol Group of buildings on the hill. The design of the Capitol Campus is a grand example of the City Beautiful style of the Progressive era of the early 20th Century.

== History ==
=== 19th century ===
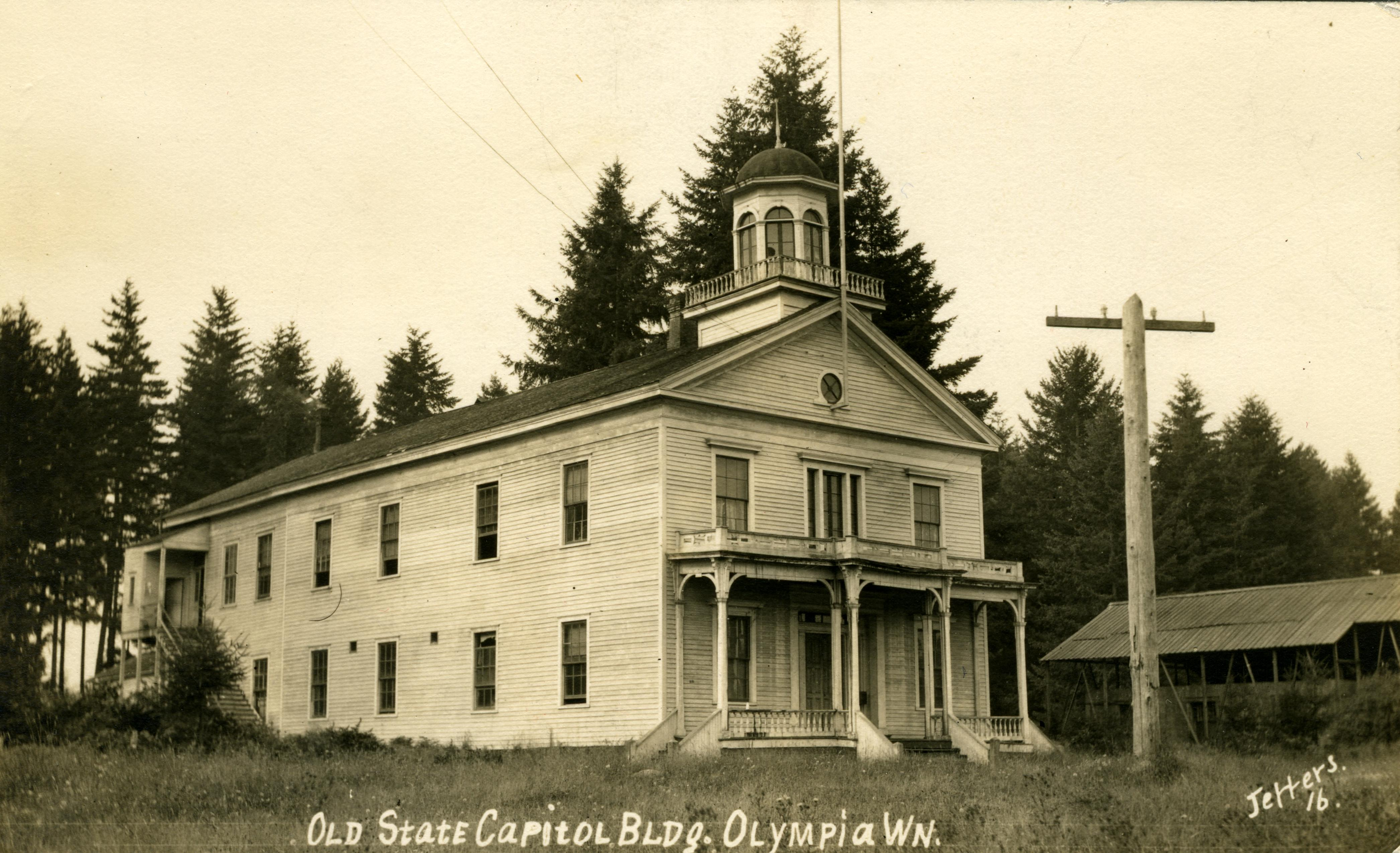
Original territorial Capitol building, completed in 1856.

After Olympia became the capital city of the Washington Territory in 1853, the city's founder, Edmund Sylvester, gave the legislature 12 acres (4.9 ha) of land upon which to build the capitol, located on a hill overlooking what is now known as Capitol Lake.

In 1854, the first session of the Territorial Legislature took place in a two-story building in Olympia known as the Parker-Coulter Dry Goods store (a.k.a. the Gold Bar Restaurant). The second and following sessions until 1856 met at the Masonic Hall. In 1856, a wood-frame structure was completed, located on the present site between the Legislative and Insurance buildings, which would serve as the Capitol for 46 years until 1902.

When President Benjamin Harrison approved Washington's state constitution in 1889, he donated 132,000 acres (530 km^{2}) of federal lands to the state with the stipulation that income from the lands was to be used solely for construction of the state capitol.

The legislature formed the State Capitol Commission in 1893 to oversee the creation of a new capitol on the property in Olympia. The commission had a nationwide competition to find an architect and chose the submission of Ernest Flagg. Construction began on Flagg's plan, but was soon stalled by poor economic conditions with only the foundation completed.

When the legislature finally approved an appropriation of additional funds in 1897, newly elected Governor John Rogers vetoed it. Rogers advocated the purchase of the existing Thurston County Courthouse in downtown Olympia, now known as the Old Capitol and home to the Office of Superintendent of Public Instruction.

=== 20th century ===
The legislature approved the Courthouse as the new location and began meeting there in 1905. Within a few years, the legislature decided the building was too small and a new State Capitol Commission convened in 1911.

This time, the commission was interested in constructing a group of buildings to serve as the capitol rather than a single facility and selected the design submitted by the company Walter Wilder and Harry White in 1911. Following the award to Wilder and White the commission retained the Olmsted Brothers landscape design firm as advisors. The Olmsted firm provided an alternative concept for the campus in early 1912 but this alternative was rejected by both the commission and Wilder and White. The completed building sizes, orientations, and views are the work of Wilder and White. The commission invited the Olmsted Brothers to return in 1927, after construction of the Legislative Building was completed, to layout the plantings, pathways and approaches from Capitol Way. The landscaping from Capitol Way west to the Legislative Building was completed in 1931.

Construction of the campus began in 1912, and the Temple of Justice was completed in 1920, followed by the Insurance Building and the power and heating plant. After multiple revisions of the plans, the Legislative Building was completed in 1928. The John A. Cherberg Building was completed in 1937 and the John L. O'Brien Building in 1940. These buildings are five of the six major elements in Wilder and White's master plan. Unfortunately, the sixth building was never constructed. The missing building appears, for example, on the 1928 Olmsted Plan for the grounds and is marked as "future building" just to the west of the Legislative Building. The Governor's Mansion (constructed in 1909 as a temporary structure) occupies the space intended for the sixth building in Wilder and White's plan.

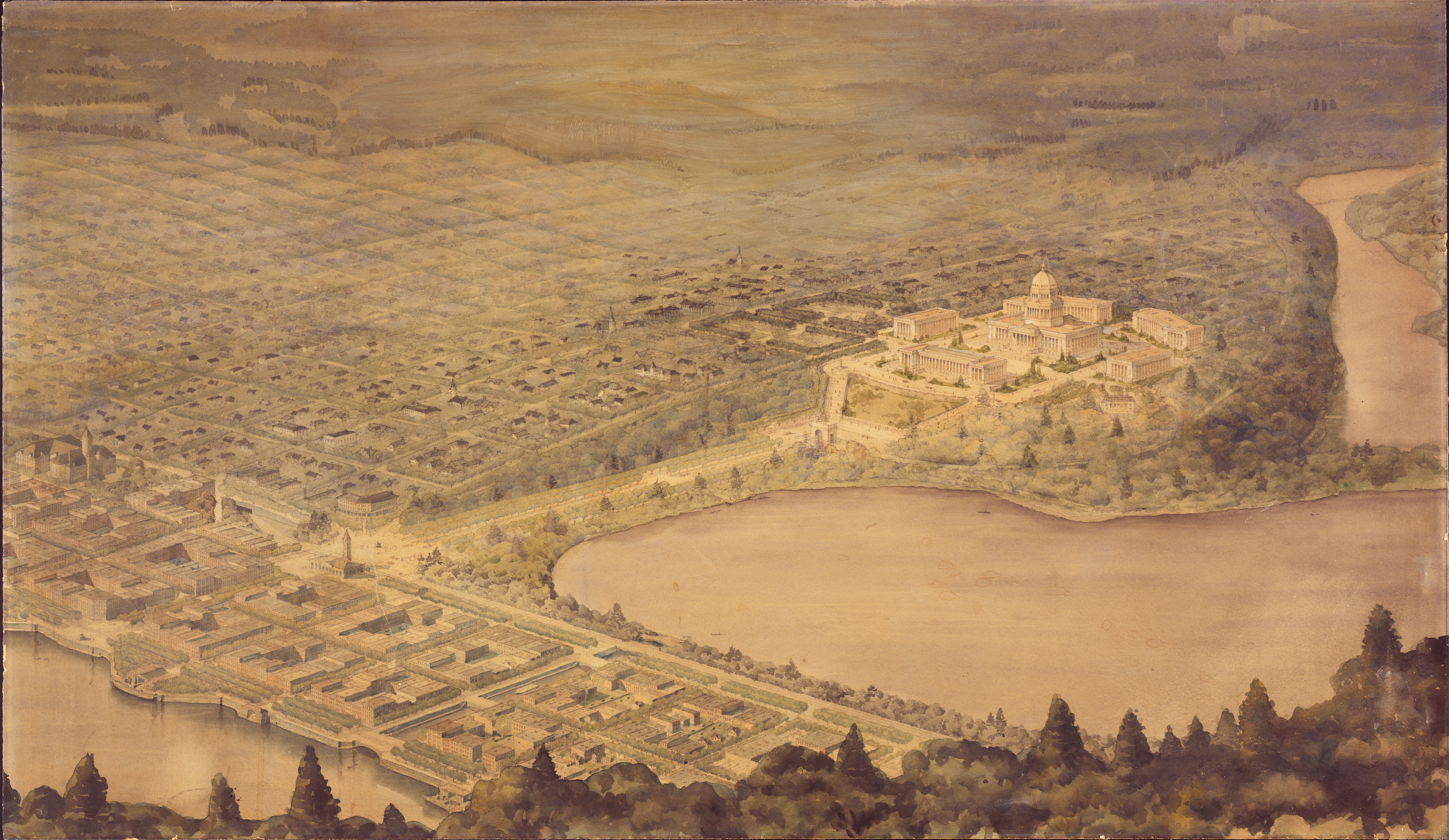
Wilder and White's plan for the Capitol Campus, c. 1913

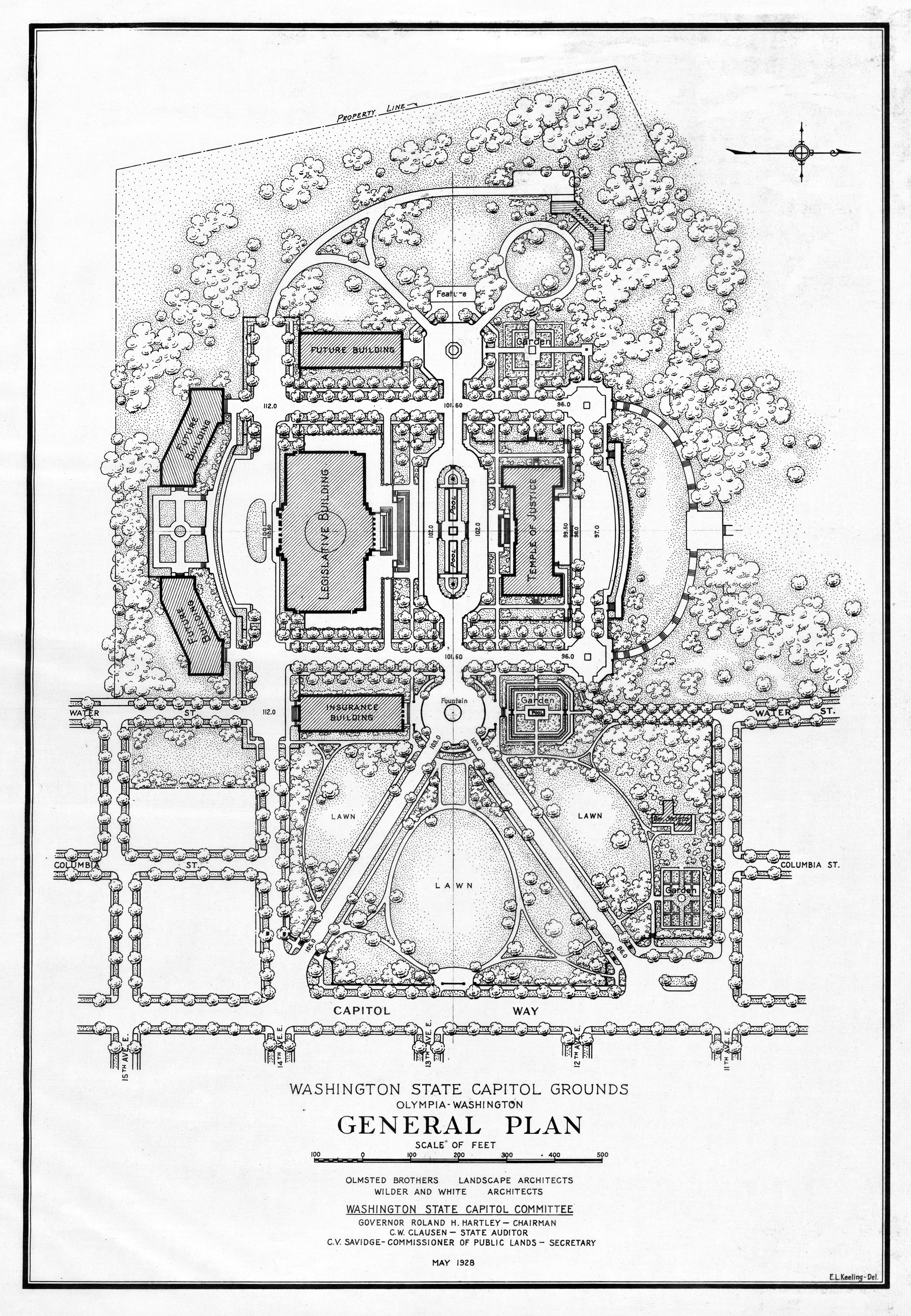
Design of the Capitol Campus Grounds, May 1928

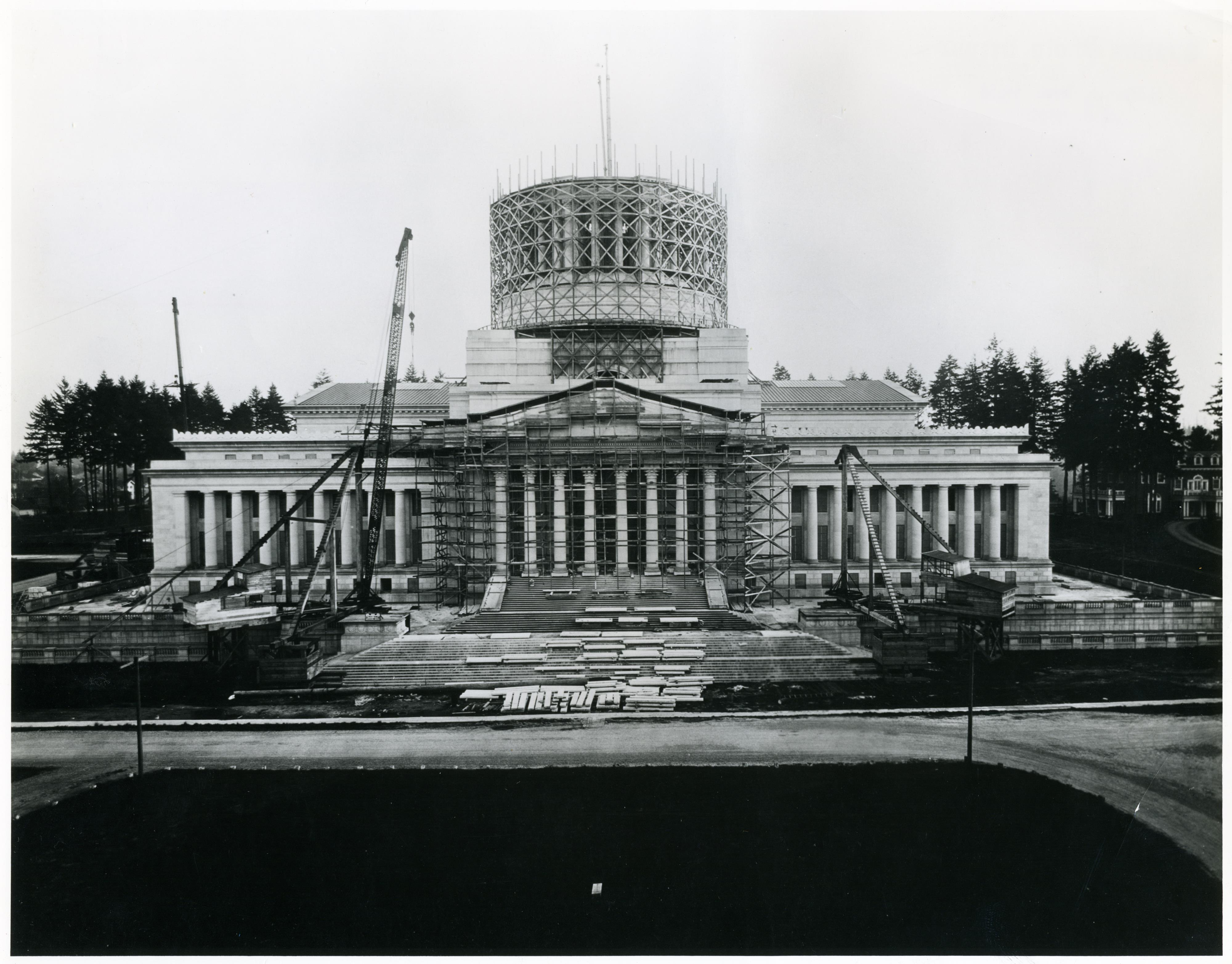
Construction of the Legislative Building, c. January 1926 – c. May 1926

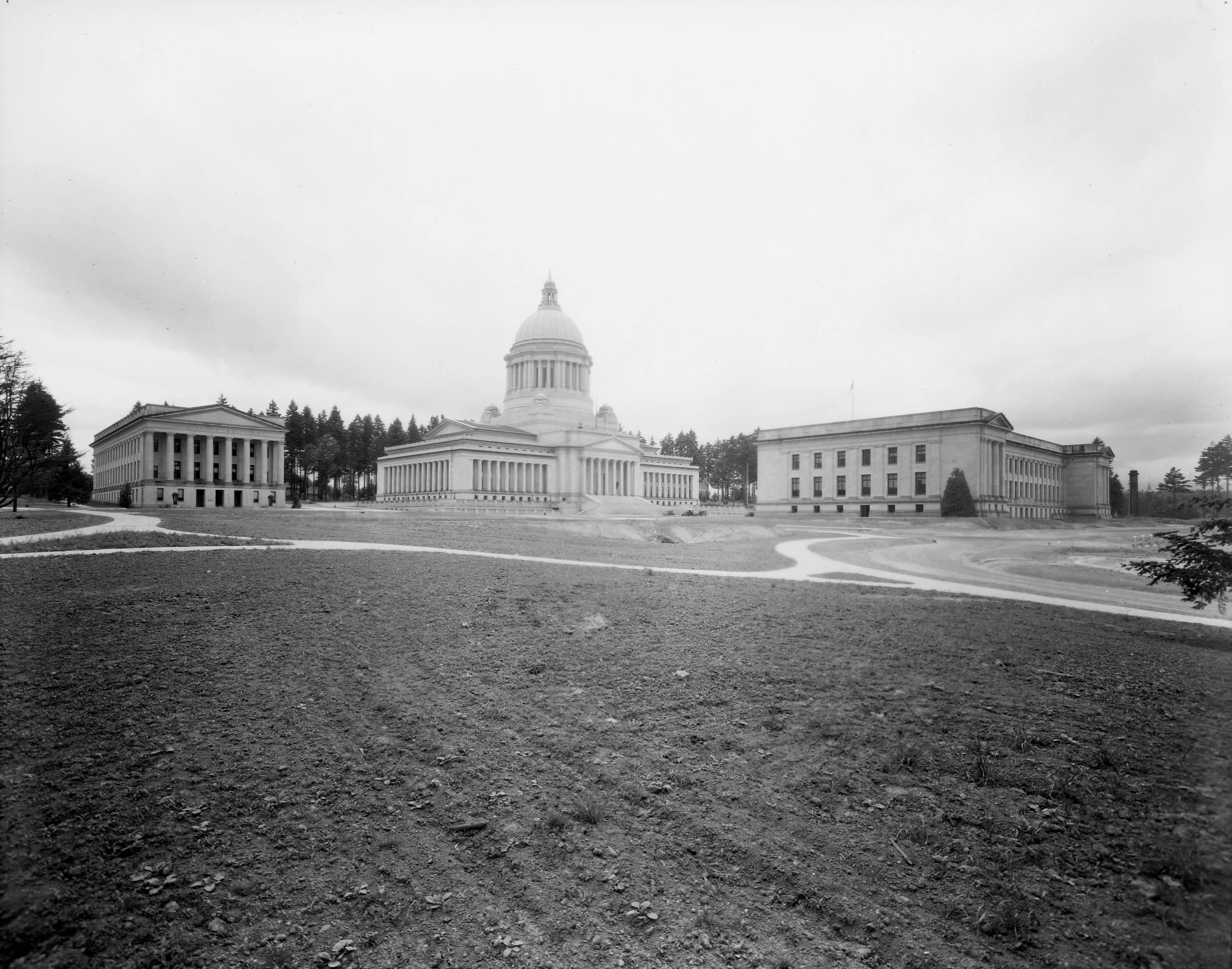
View of completed buildings, c. 1927

=== 21st century ===
During the evening of Sunday, October 6, 2025, an intruder vandalized the interior after breaking several windows to gain access to the building. The rotunda space and State Reception Room suffered damages. Various county, federal, and state flags were set ablaze and the busts of George Washington and Martin Luther King were pushed over and damaged. Additional damages included a broken glass door to the reception room, various historical artifacts either broken or set on fire. and floors throughout the space either burned or marred, such as burn marks and chipped areas to the rotunda stairs. A burned rug that was original to the site was manufactured in 1928; the rug is noted to be the largest single-loom carpet in the world. An 1893 Blüthner grand piano that was gifted to the state in 1990 and restored in 2017, was marred by nearby flames. While most items were estimated to cost less than $10,000 each, the approximated cost of all repairs were reported to be between $623,000 to $914,000. The restoration of the historic rug was to consist of most of the repair expenditures, estimated as high as $719,000.

The accused, theorized to be suffering from a mental health episode, surrendered while still in the capitol building and was subsequently arrested. Monetary damages in the days after the event were not yet tallied. The last known break-in to the capitol occurred in 2014 when two women accessed the governor's office and stole various items including a blanket of the Squaxin Island Tribe.

An attempted break-in occurred in June 2026. The arrested suspect did not gain entry but damaged 13 window casements and two doors by throwing rocks at the Capitol building. Protective film on the windows, installed after the 2025 incident, was considered a primary deterrent to the suspect. The damages were estimated to be approximately $100,000.

=== Natural disasters ===
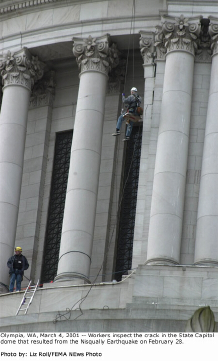
Workers inspect the crack in the State Capitol dome that resulted from the Nisqually earthquake, 2001

Three major earthquakes have affected the capitol since its construction. The first, in 1949, damaged the cupola of the Legislative Building's dome so badly that it had to be completely replaced. A 6.5 magnitude earthquake in 1965 had even worse results, with the dome's brick buttresses left in such poor condition that a major aftershock could have caused them to collapse entirely, according to a state report. The state performed work after both earthquakes to reduce the impact of future occurrences, and performed additional seismic improvements in 1975. The Nisqually earthquake of 2001 caused further damage, including a splintered buttress, but the earthquake-resistance work prevented more serious harm to the building.

Wilder and White's designs for the dome, weighing 26,000 metric tons, called for the dome to be fixed to its supporting structures by gravity instead of by any bolts or fasteners. During an earthquake, the dome could shift, along with the sandstone columns supporting it. The columns moved as much as three inches (76 mm) during the Nisqually earthquake. The state government vacated the capitol building at the end of the 2002 legislative session for the two-year renovation project. During preparations for the project, one of two time capsules dedicated during the 1953 state centennial celebration had been found and nearly discarded until it was saved by a state employee.

The renovation project officially began on June 2, 2002, and cost approximately $120 million to complete; two workers were injured during the project. For two years, the House was relocated to a pair of modular buildings in a nearby parking lot, while the Senate moved to the former state library building. The office of the governor moved to the headquarters of the Insurance Commissioner's Office. The capitol reopened on January 10, 2005, at the start of a new legislative session. The renovation project attached the dome permanently to the rest of the building.

== Buildings ==
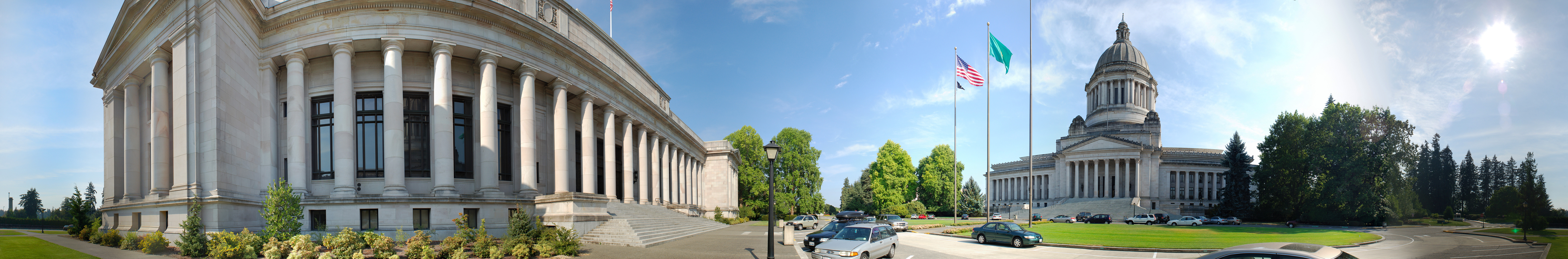
Panorama of the Temple of Justice and the Legislative Building, August 2009.

Located on the campus are the Legislative Building, Temple of Justice, John A. Cherberg Senate office building, Irv Newhouse Senate office building, Insurance Building, John L. O'Brien House office building, Joel M. Pritchard Building, and several other office buildings. The Capitol Conservatory, built in 1939 by the Works Progress Administration, housed various types of flora until it was permanently closed on September 5, 2008. The campus also hosts many veterans' memorials.

The state seal, which is featured throughout the buildings on the state flag, tapestries, railing, door handles and elsewhere, was designed by Olympia Jeweler Charles Talcot by making two circles and putting a two-cent stamp of George Washington in the middle. There is even a bronze version of the seal in the floor of the rotunda. Over time, George Washington's nose has worn down due to foot traffic on it and it is now roped-off to prevent further damage.

=== Legislative Building ===
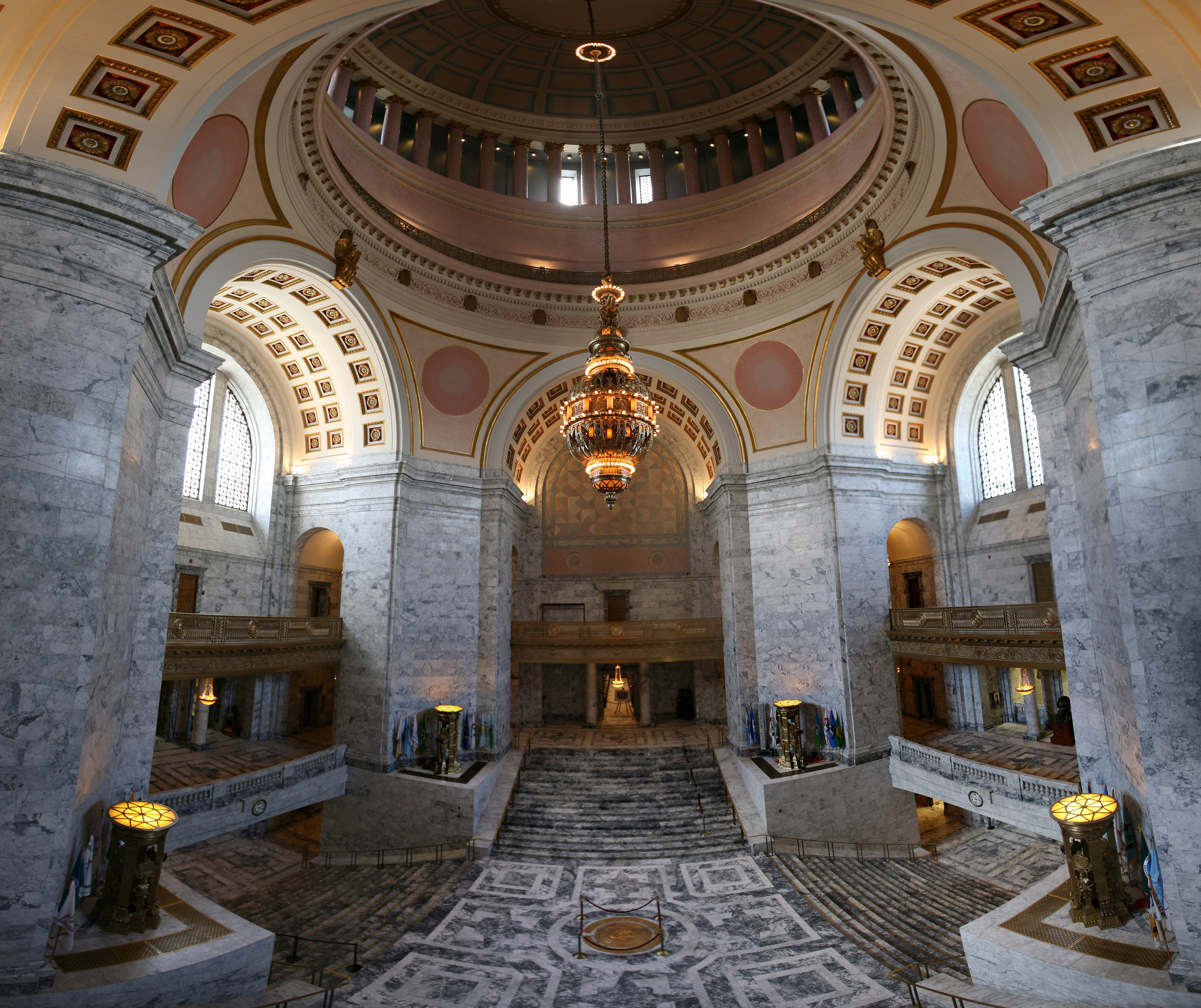
Interior of the Legislative Building.

The Legislative Building houses the chambers of the Washington State Legislature and offices of several elected officials. This building is the dominant feature of the capitol grounds, with its dome 287 feet (87 m) high, making it the tallest self-supporting masonry dome in North America, and fifth tallest in the world, surpassed only by St. Peter's Basilica in Rome, St. Paul's Cathedral in London, Global Vipassana Pagoda in Mumbai, and Santa Maria Del Fiore in Florence. A number of features in the structure commemorating Washington's addition to the Union as the 42nd state—42 steps lead to the building's North entrance and one of the four 42-star flags owned by the state is displayed in the State Reception Room. Flags with this number of stars were never official because of the admission of Idaho shortly after Washington.

The building has a rectangular footprint and is constructed of brick and concrete and faced on the exterior with sandstone quarried from Wilkeson, Washington. The structure consists of four floors with the dome at the center that reaches a height of 287 ft (87 m) on the exterior and 175 ft (53 m) from the floor. The first floor is within the raised base and houses offices. The second and third floors are surrounded by Doric columns and capped with a cornice that encircles the building. The fourth floor is covered with a gabled roof that is situated behind the cornice on the third floor. On the north facade, the entrance is in a portico framed by eight Corinthian columns reached by 42 granite steps. A similar portico is on the south facade but it covers a vehicle ramp to the lower level instead of steps. The dome is surrounded by four small sandstone domes and capped by a lantern and lightning rod. The floors and many interior walls are covered by Alaskan marble and marble from Belgium, France, Germany, Italy are used in other parts of the interior.

All lamps and Roman fire pots in the rotunda were made by Louis Comfort Tiffany, son of Charles Lewis Tiffany, founder of Tiffany and Company. These comprise the largest collection of Tiffany bronze in the world and Tiffany's last large commission before his death in 1933. The 10,000 lb (4,500 kg) chandelier above the rotunda is suspended 50 feet (15 m) above the floor by a 101 feet (31 m) chain and measures 25 feet (8 m) tall. It features life-size faces, human figures, and 202 lights.

The Legislative Building is also home to a large brass bust of George Washington. Over time, the nose on the bust has become shiny from visitors rubbing it for good luck.

=== Temple of Justice ===
Facing the Legislative Building is the Temple of Justice, home to the State Supreme Court and the State Law Library. Until 1924, the unused boiler and coal rooms located under the Temple of Justice housed the Division of Highways Testing Laboratory, which would later become the Department of Transportation Materials Laboratory.

=== Governor's Mansion ===
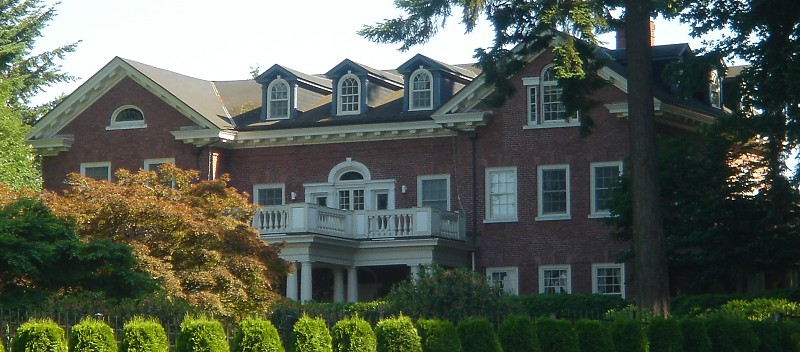
The Governor's Mansion.

The Governor's Mansion is located immediately west of the Legislative Building. Built before the rest of the capitol campus in 1908, the four-story Georgian-style mansion was intended as a temporary structure, and over the years the state legislature has considered replacing it with an office building or a new mansion. The legislature decided to renovate and remodel the existing building in 1973, and since then the private, non-profit Governor's Mansion Foundation has maintained it.

== Art and monuments ==
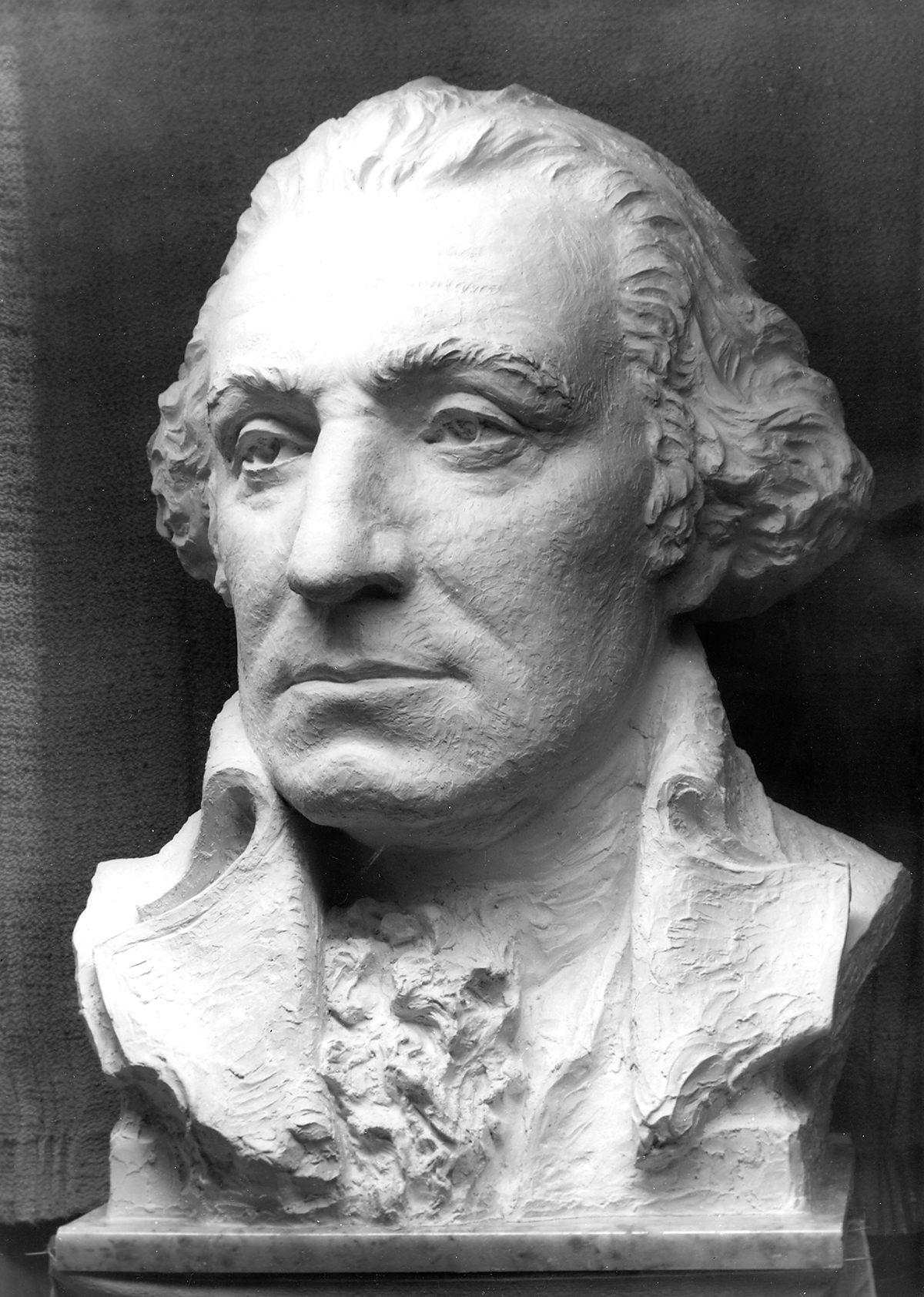
Colossal portrait sculpture of General George Washington

There are 25 art installations and monuments on the campus.

The Winged Victory monument, commemorating World War I, is one of the most prominent. Sculpted by Alonzo Victor Lewis from bronze, its granite pedestal has four inscriptions. Dedicated May 30, 1938, the monument has been restored numerous times since then.

The Tivoli Fountain replica was designed by the architects Wohleb, Wohleb, and Bennett. Inscribed upon it is "Replica of the Tivoli Fountain—Tivoli Park, Copenhagen, Denmark. Presented to the State of Washington by Olympia-Tumwater Foundation. Peter G. Schmidt, President. 1953."

Other points of interest include World War II, Korean War, Vietnam War, medal of honor, POW–MIA, and law enforcement memorials; monument to the family of early Washington pioneer George Bush; Arc of Statehood; Boiler Works; Du Pen Fountain; Mysteries of Life; Sea to Sky; The Shaman; an untitled sculpture by Lee Kelly (1973); Territorial Sundial; the Water Garden; and Woman Dancing. General George Washington, a colossal portrait by Avard Fairbanks, is placed in the reception room (another is installed at Washington University Medical School in Washington, D.C.).

In 1980, the Washington State Arts Commission commissioned large contemporary murals by Michael Spafford and Alden Mason for the House and Senate chambers. The Spafford mural was covered by a curtain after being displayed for less than a year, with critics of the work in the House chambers calling it "pornographic". Both Legislative Building murals were removed, from the Senate in 1987 and the House in 1993. Lawmakers also rejected plans for monumental murals by Jacob Lawrence to adorn the Capitol rotunda.

== Security ==
Because the Capitol grounds are outside the normal jurisdiction of Olympia and Thurston County, the sheriff and city police do not investigate crime on the Capitol campus. The Washington State Patrol is responsible for law enforcement and investigations on the Capitol grounds as well as at the Old Capitol Building and adjoining Sylvester Park in downtown Olympia. The Senate and House also have their own security staff.

After the September 11 attacks, there was a security checkpoint at the entrance to the Capitol building, complete with magnetometer and x-ray machine, but security has since reverted to its original state. Until 2021 the open carry of firearms was allowed in the building.

== Controversies ==
In December 2008, an atheist sign was displayed adjacent to a nativity scene in the Capitol as part of a Christmas display; it was erected by the Freedom From Religion Foundation in response to the nativity scene. This sparked widespread media coverage and controversy; the sign was stolen, but eventually found and returned to the Capitol. There was a rapid influx of requests from individuals and groups wanting to display other material, including a Festivus pole and a request by the Westboro Baptist Church to display a sign saying (among other things) "Santa Claus will take you to hell."

== Gallery ==
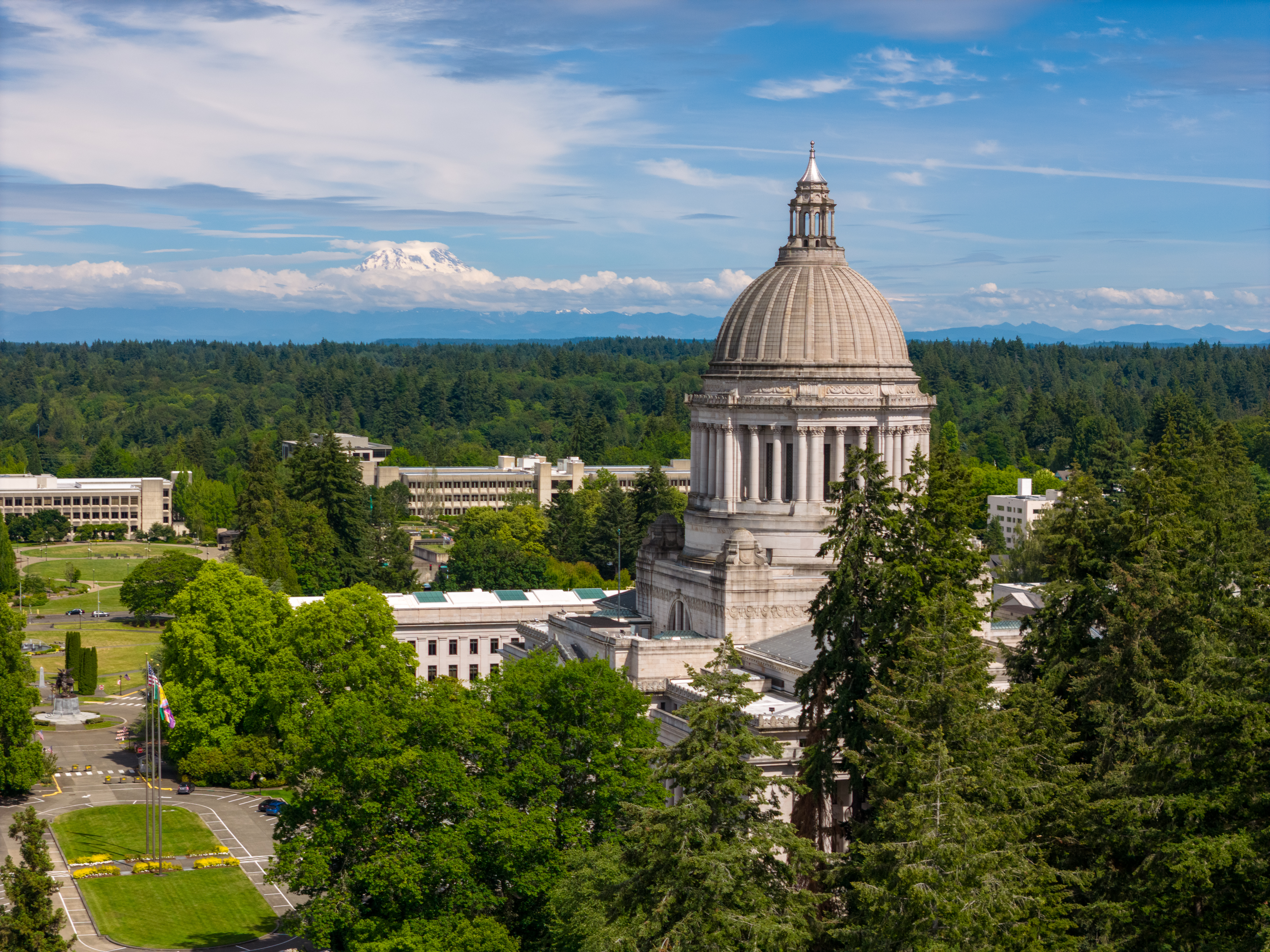
Washington State Capitol with Mount Rainier

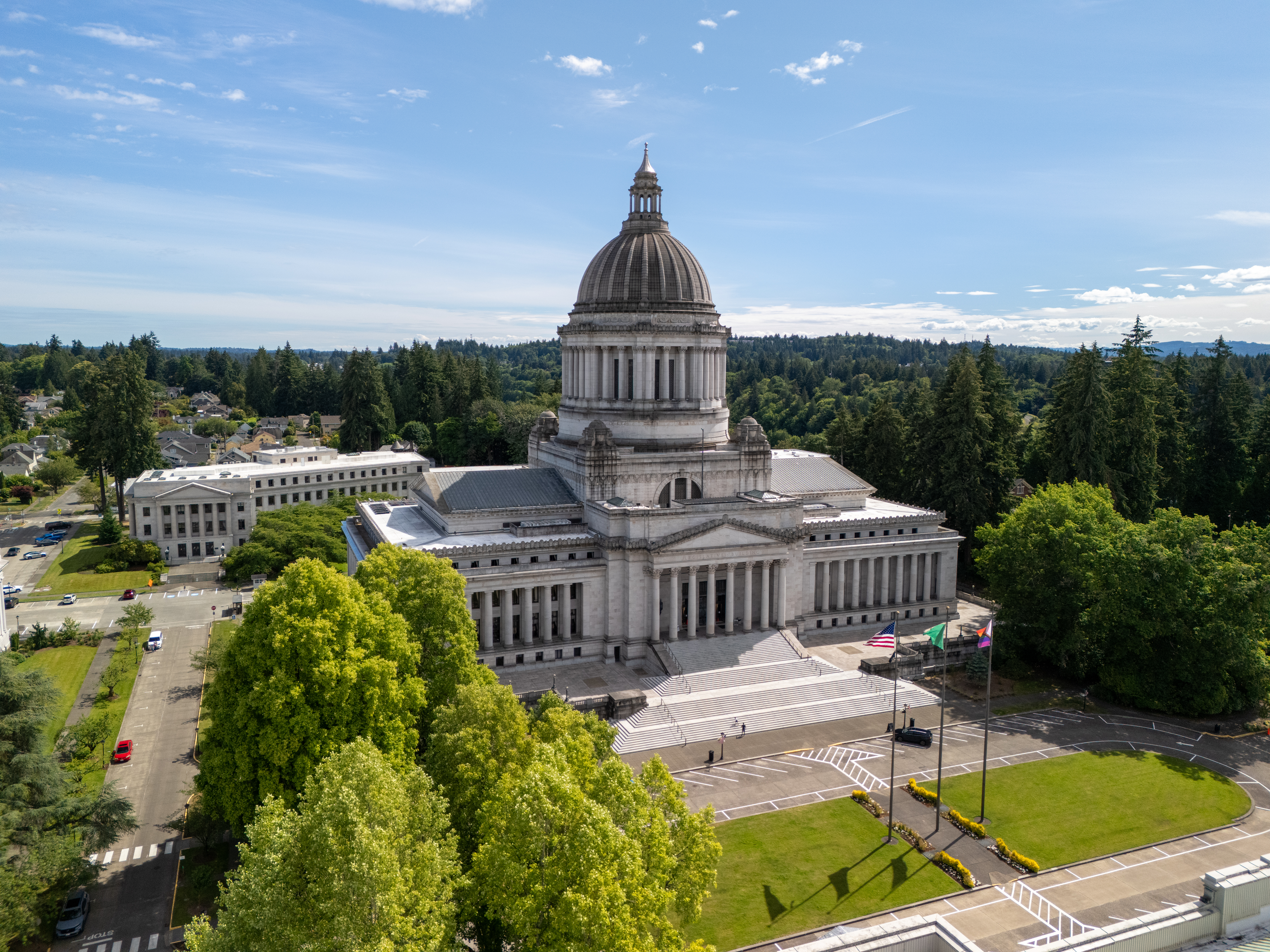
Washington State Capitol in Summer 2024

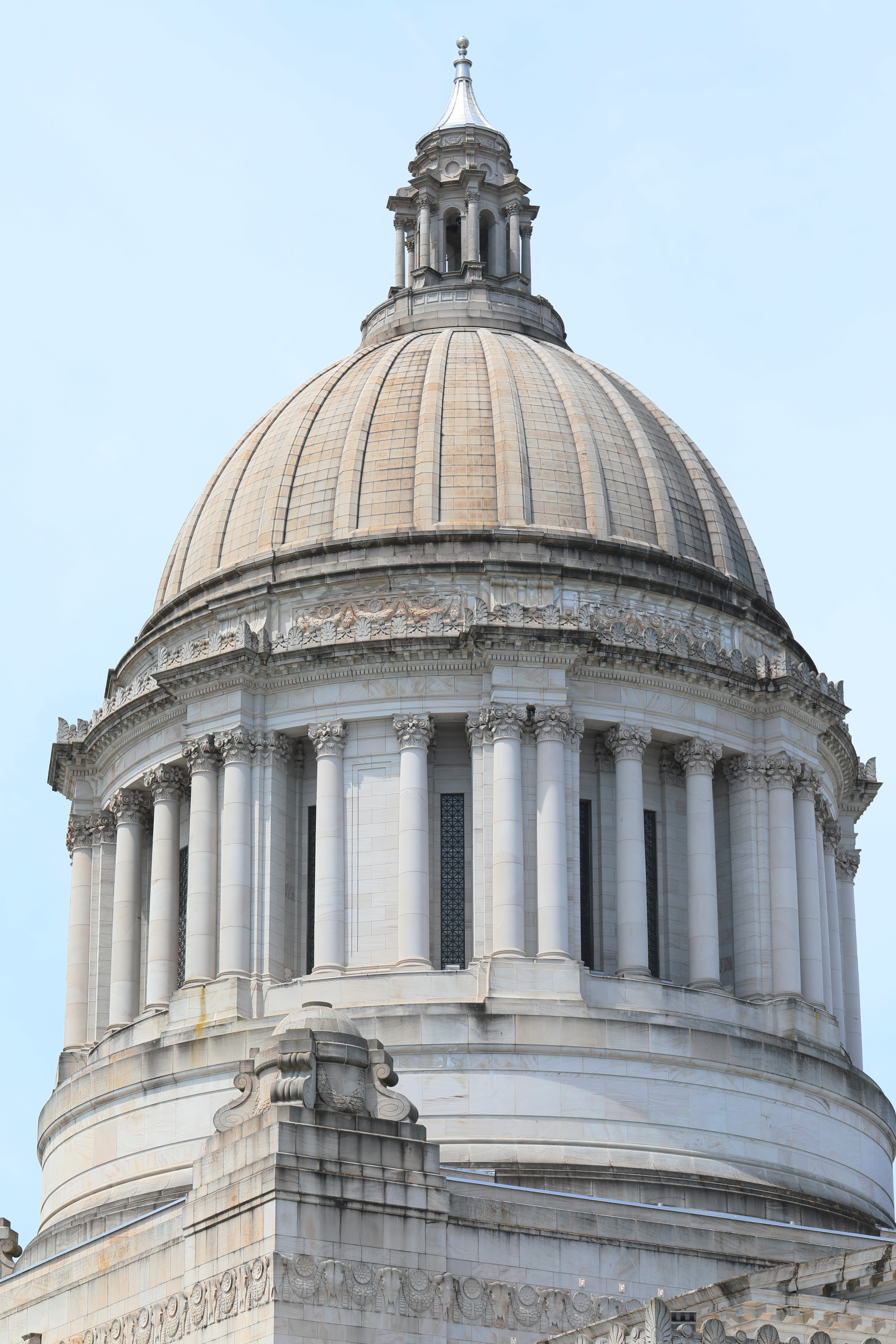
Legislative Building dome in June 2025

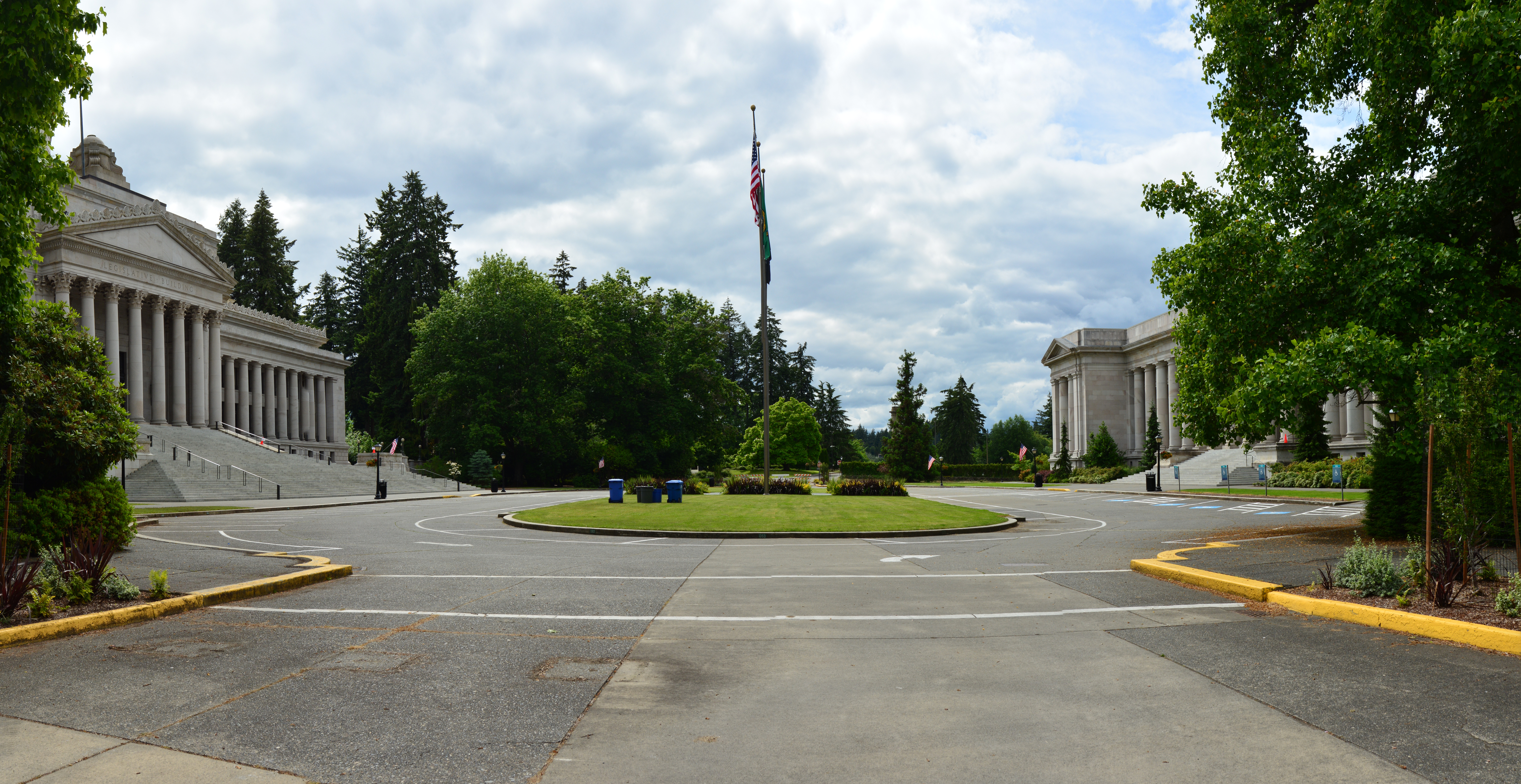
Panoramic view of the Legislative Building and Temple of Justice.

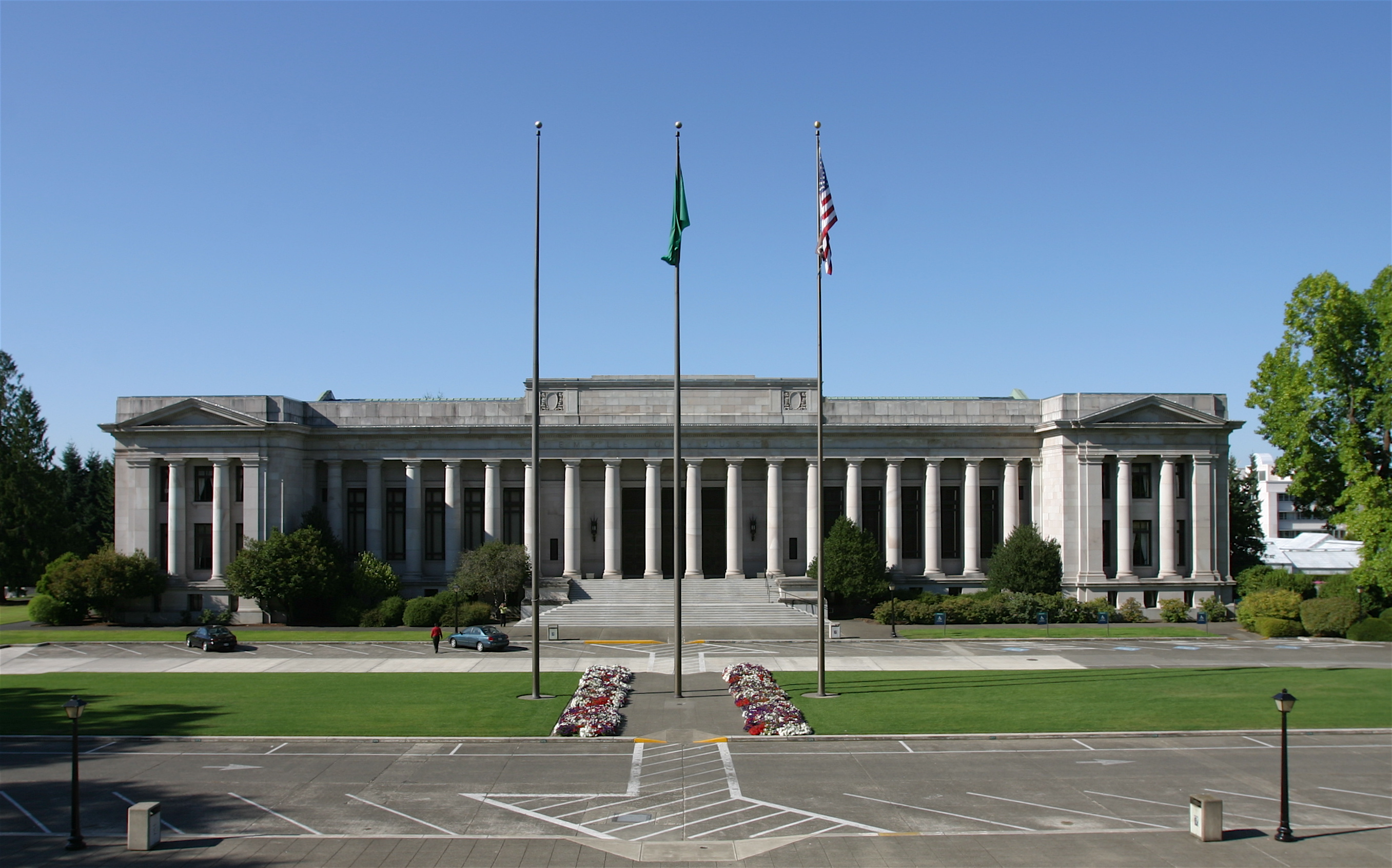
Entrance to the Temple of Justice, facing the Legislative Building.

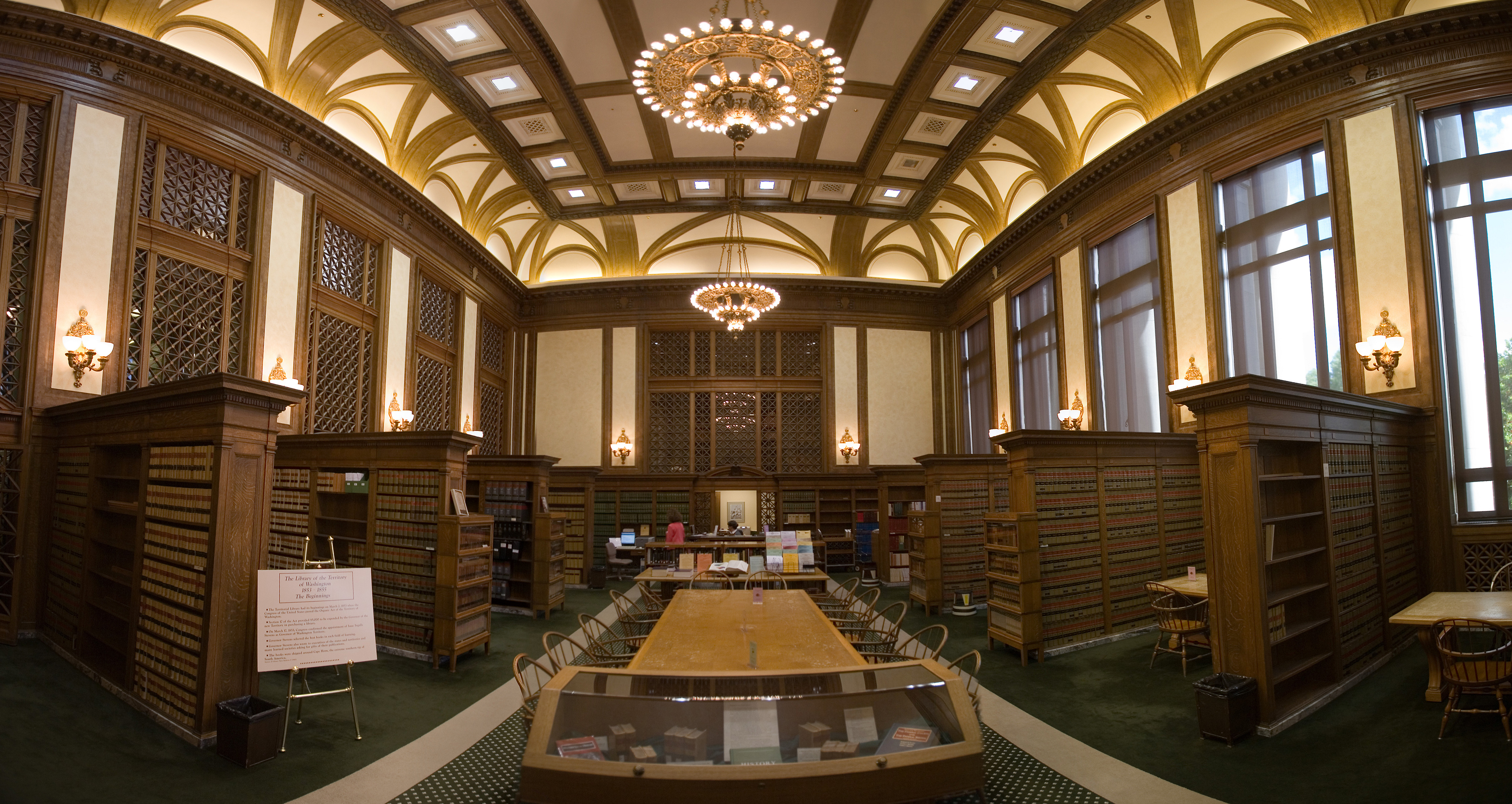
The law library in the Temple of Justice.

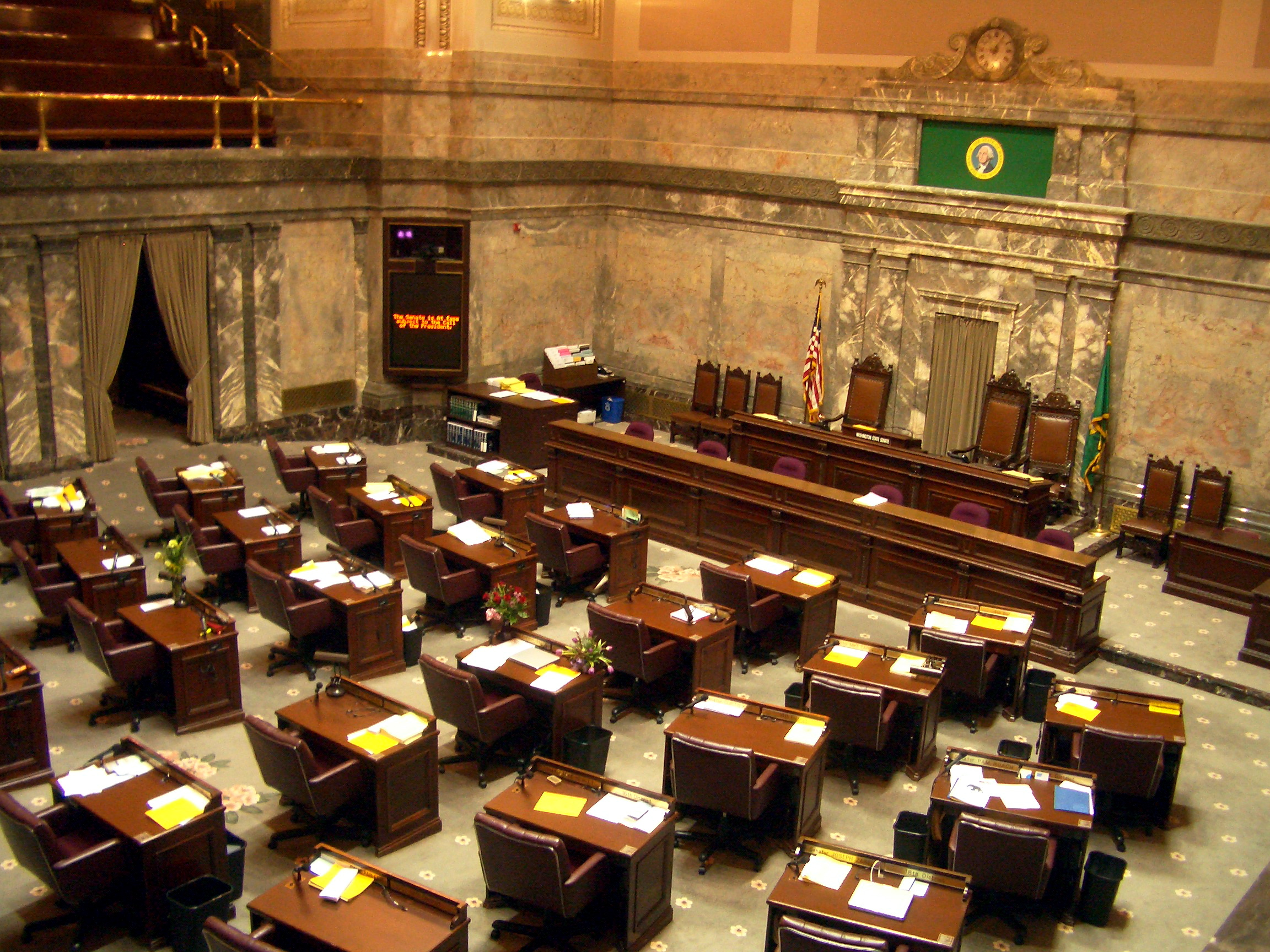
The interior of the Senate Chamber in the Legislative Building.

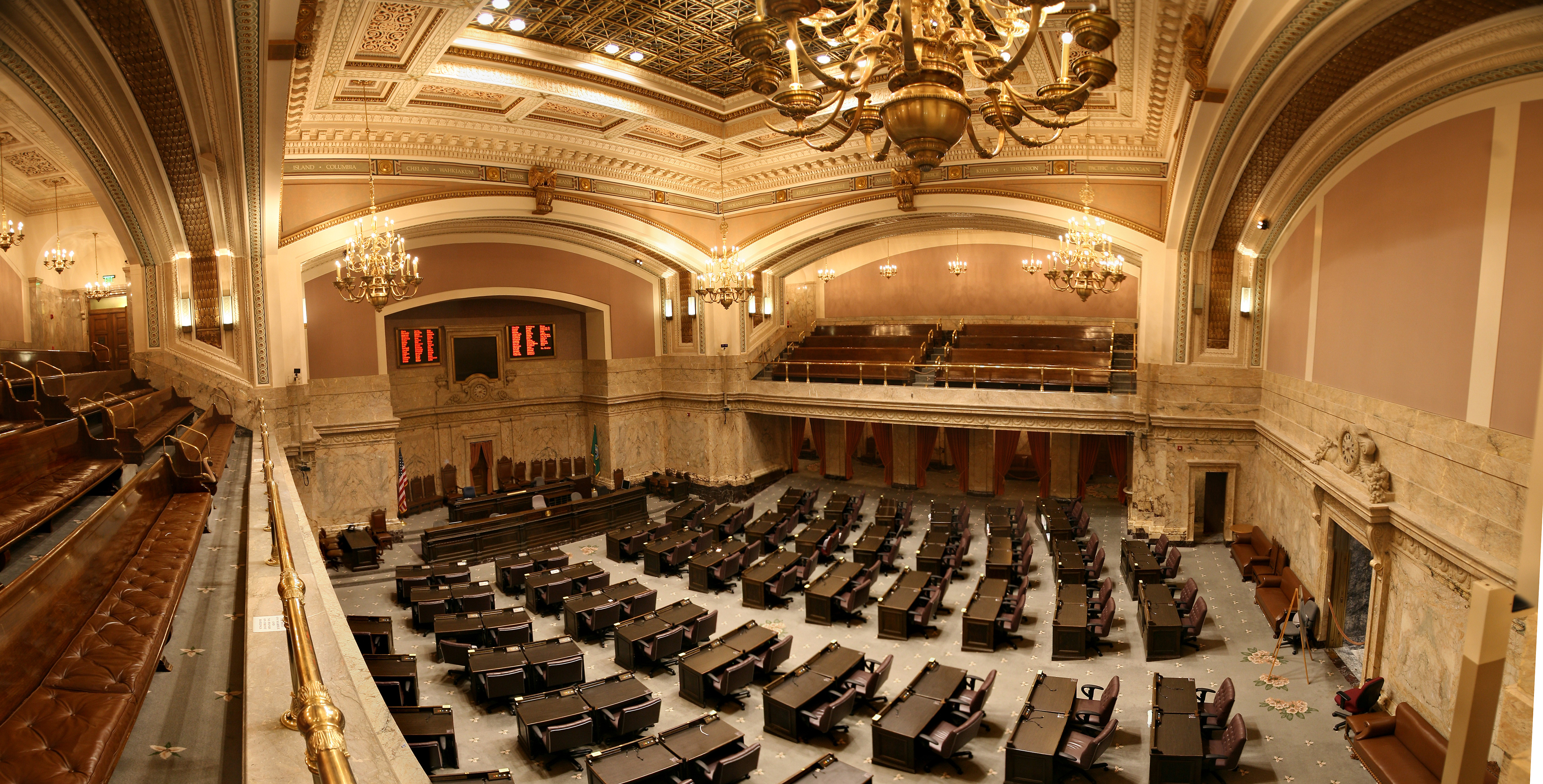
The House of Representatives Chamber, also in the Legislative Building. Note the county names along the ceiling.

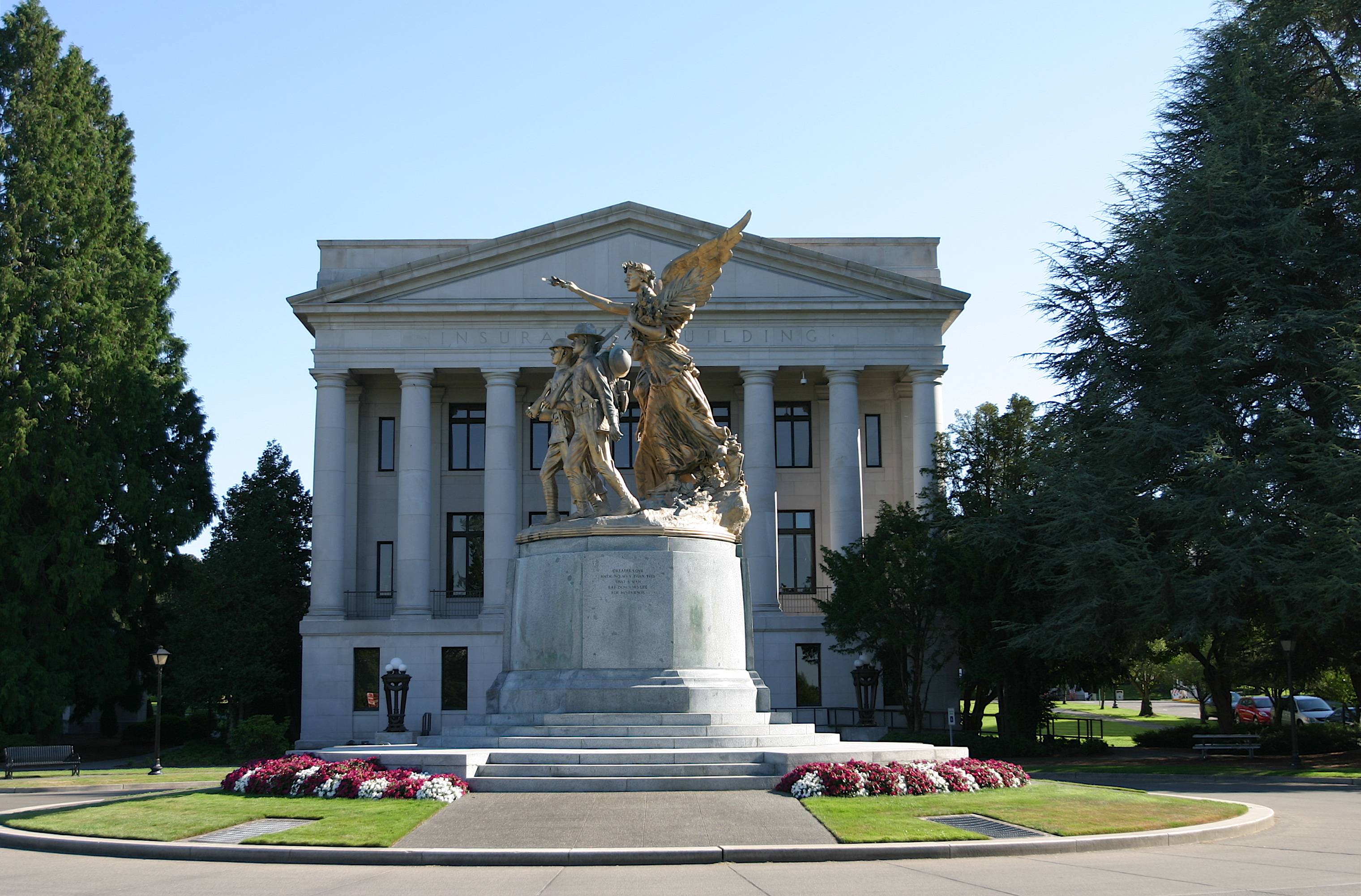
The Insurance Building.

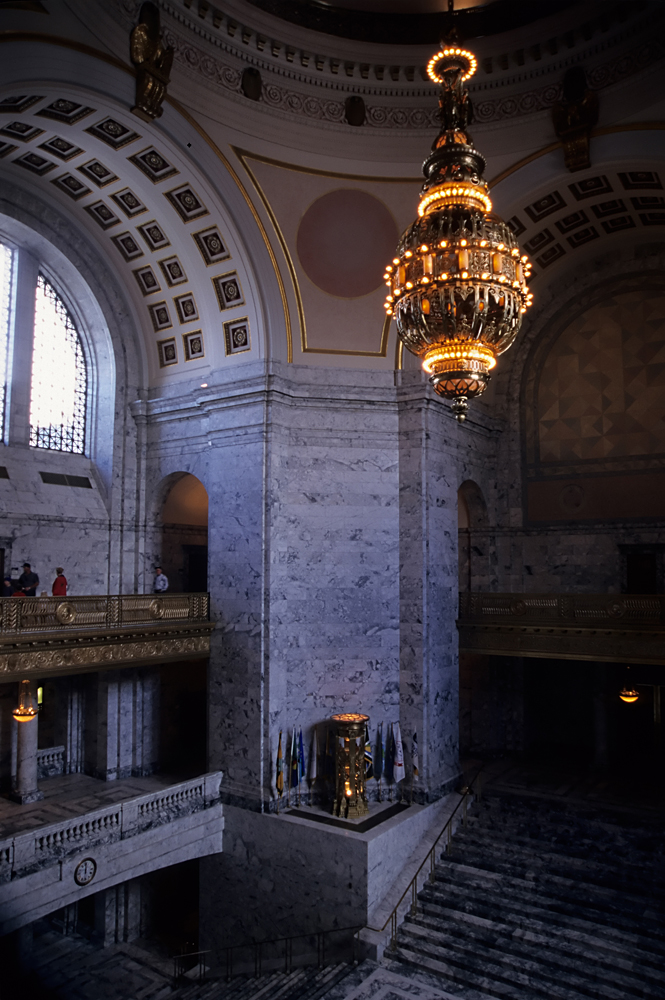
The rotunda of the Legislative building with chandelier and Roman fire pot.

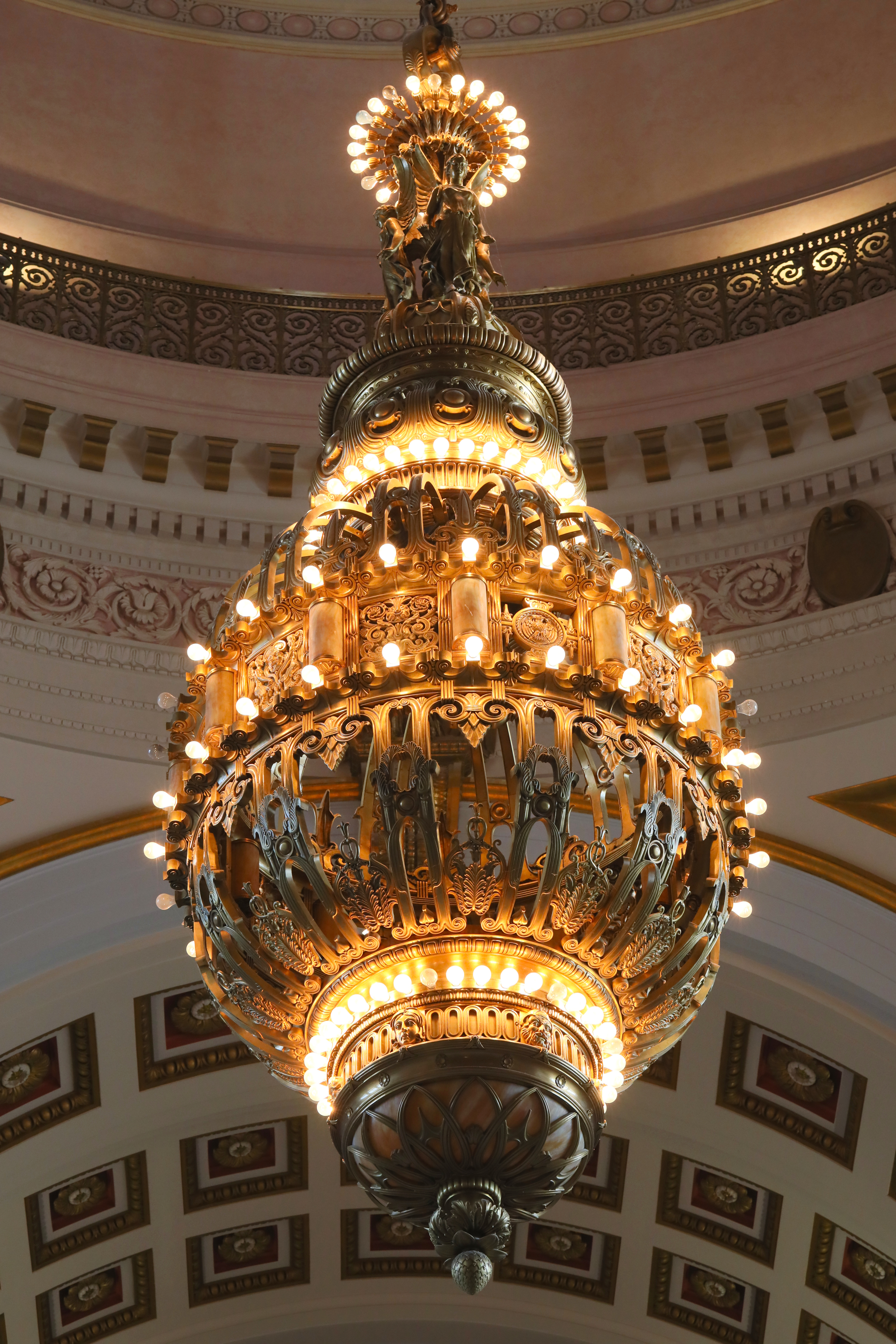
Tiffany Chandelier inside Legislative Building

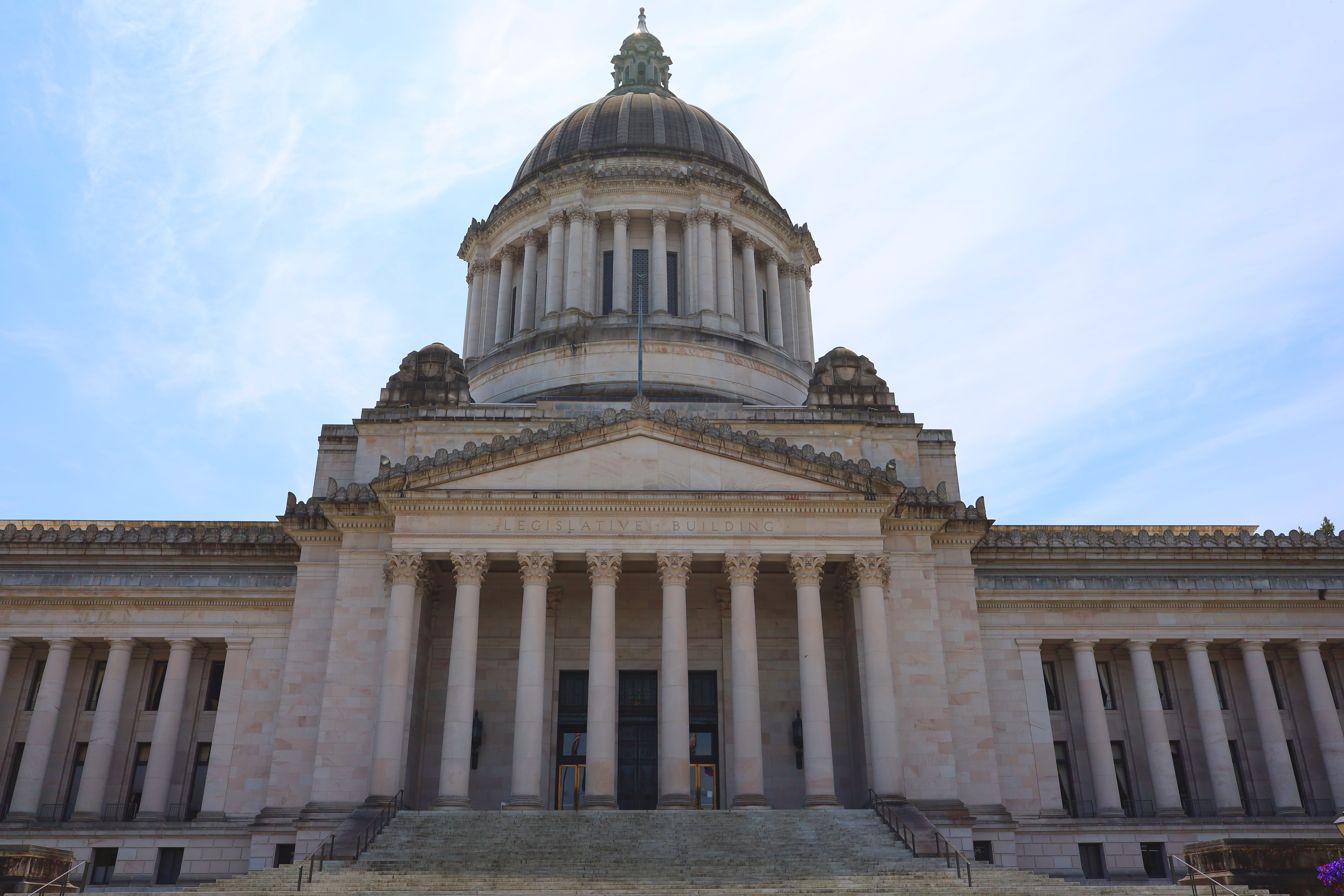
Steps of Legislative Building

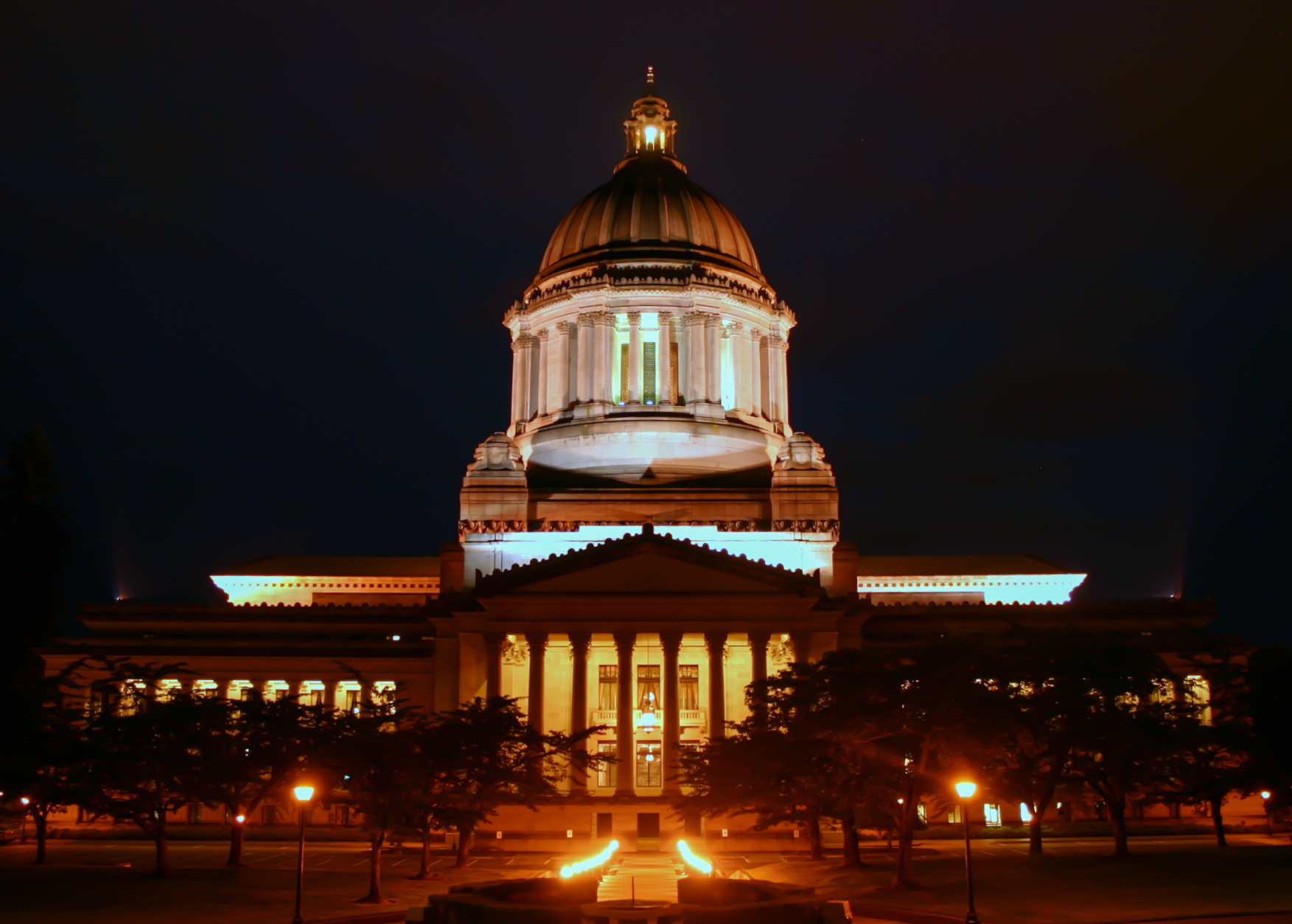
Washington Legislative Building at night

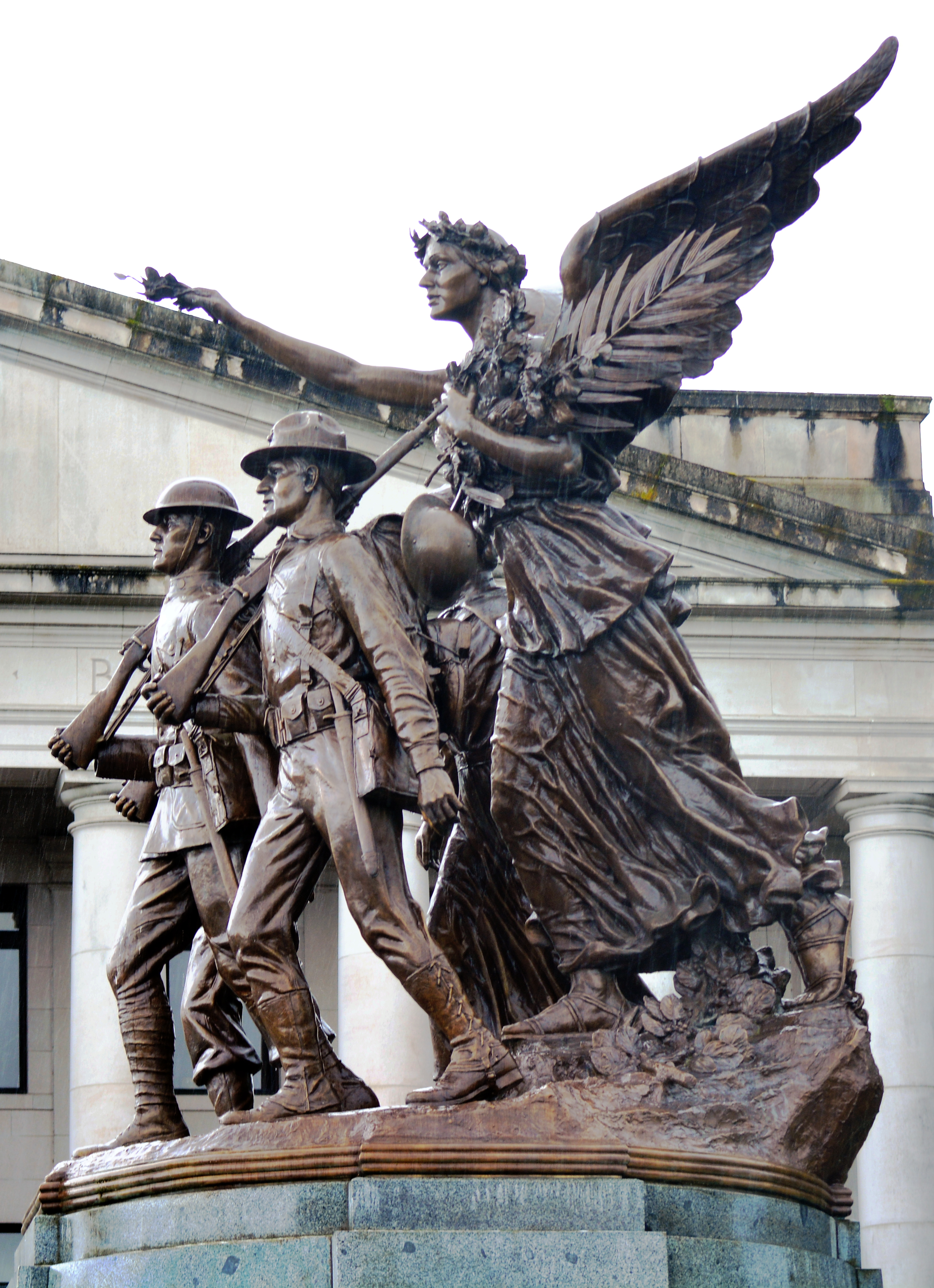
Winged Victory (World War I memorial)

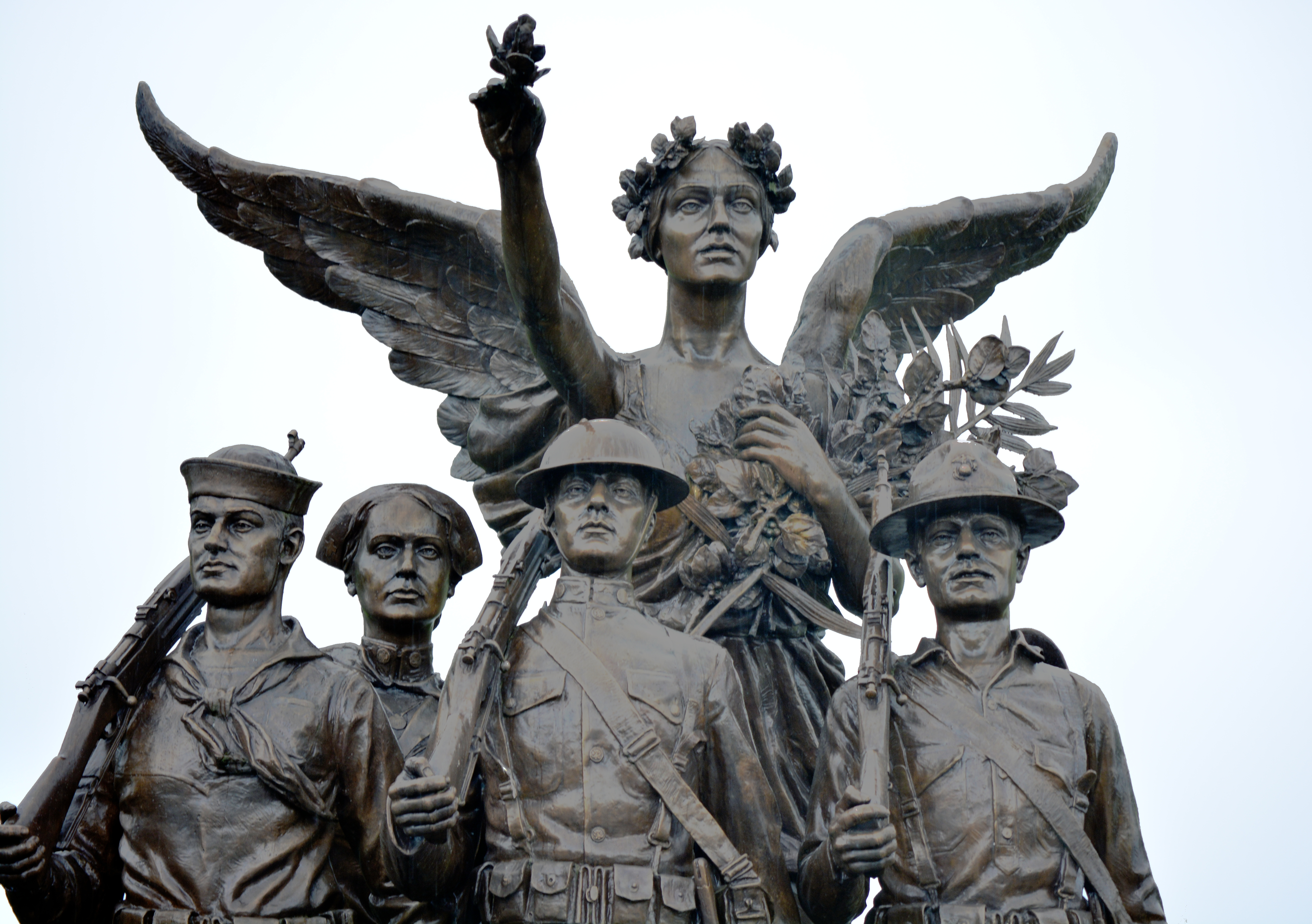
Winged Victory (detail)

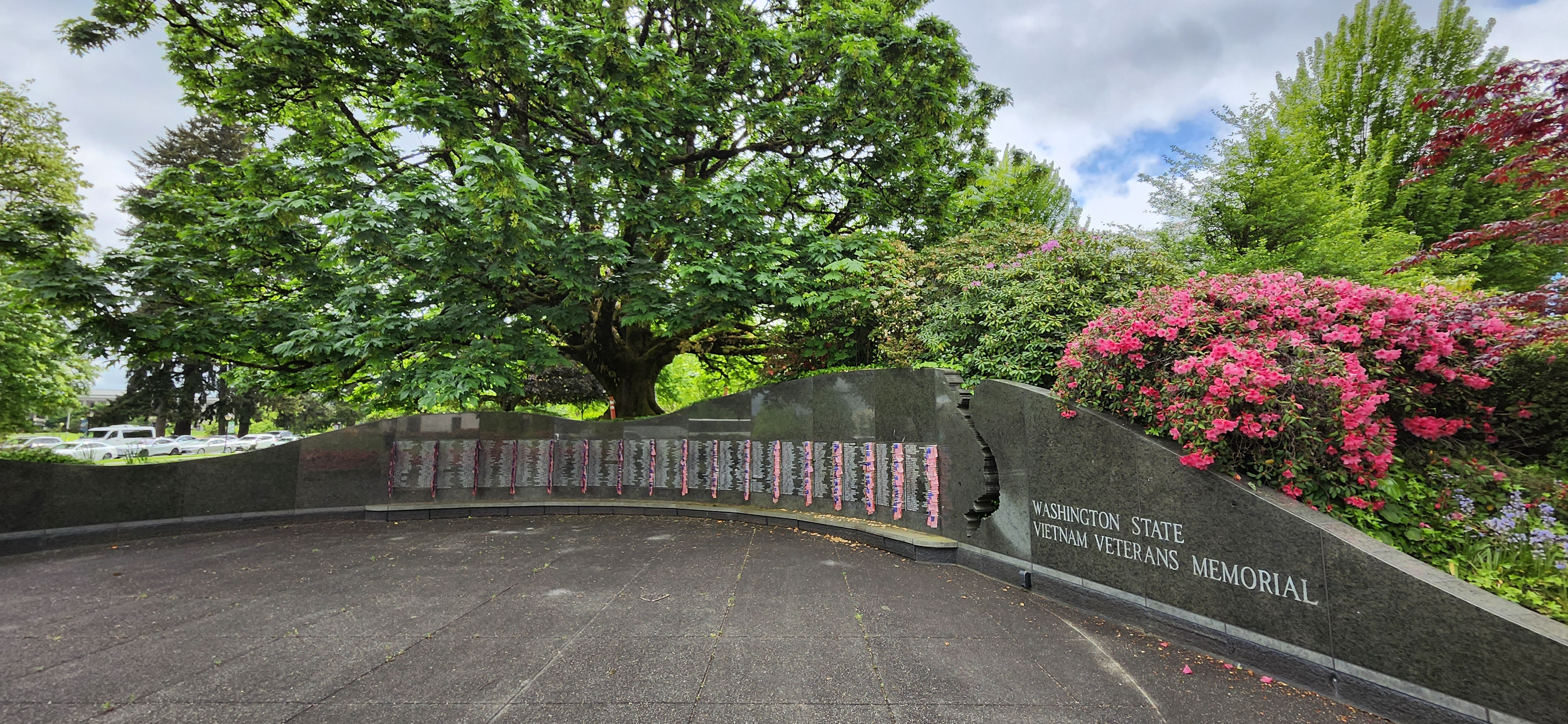
Vietnam Veterans Memorial

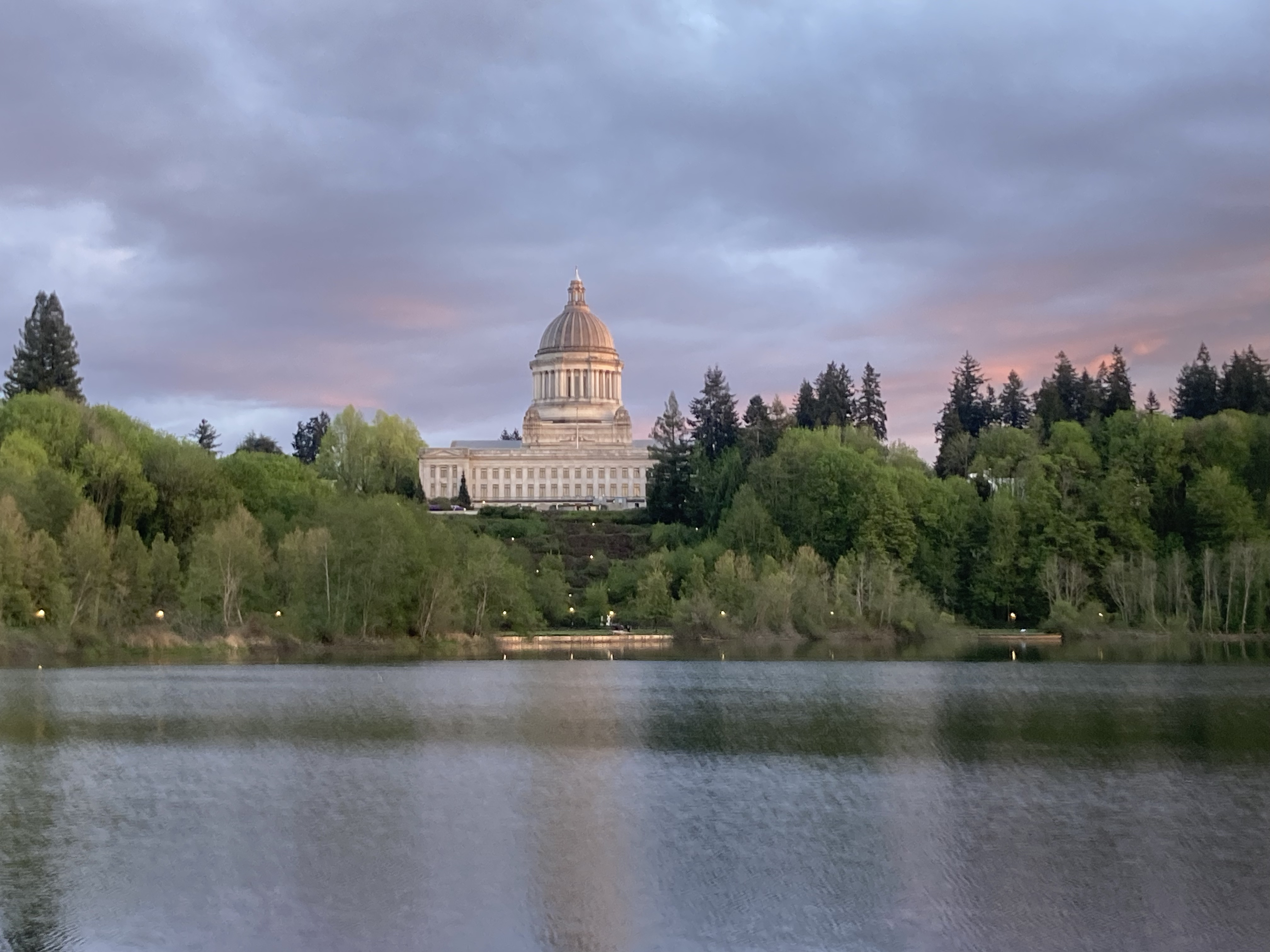
Washington State Capitol and Capitol Lake at sunset

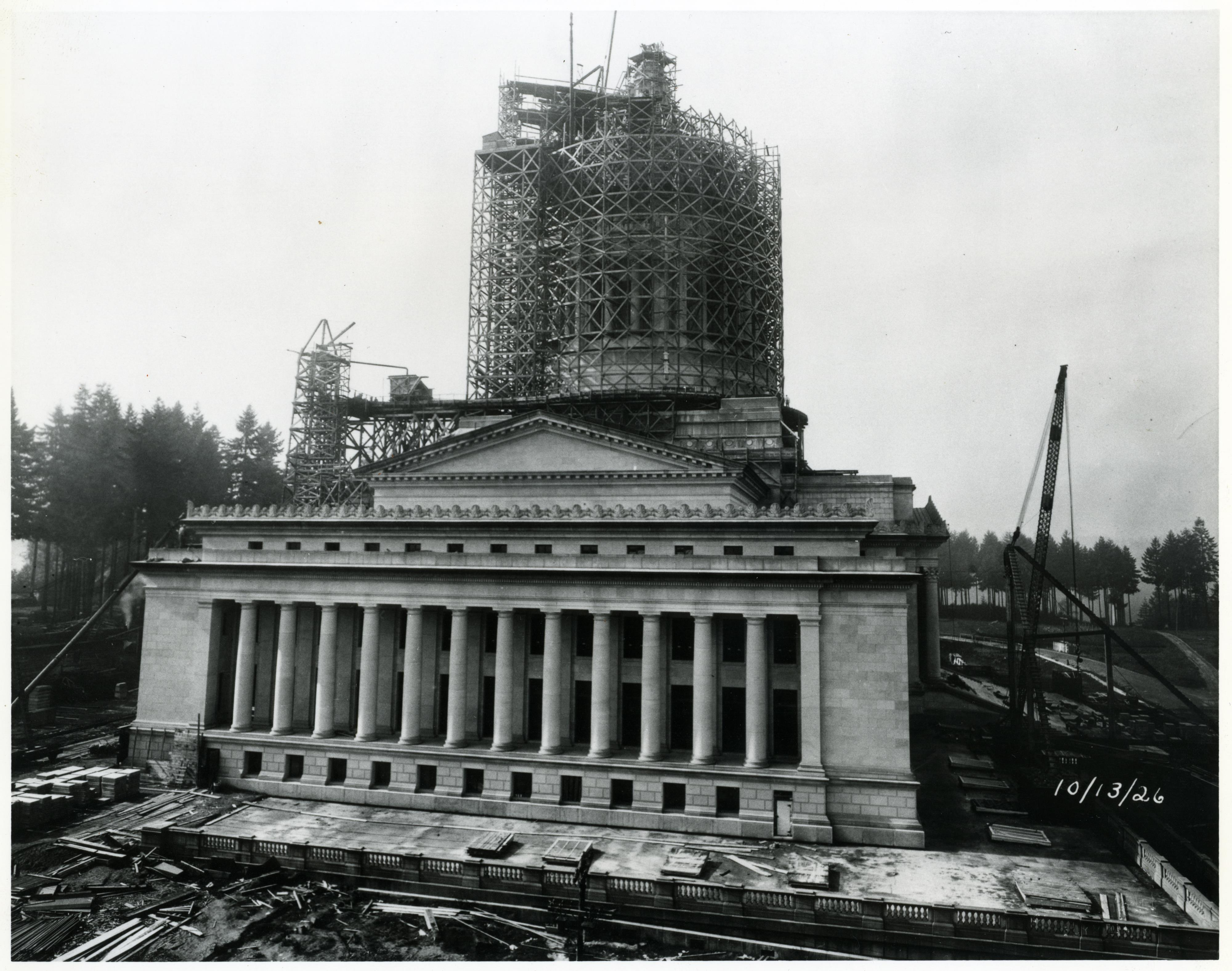
Construction of the Legislative Building (including dome), 1926.

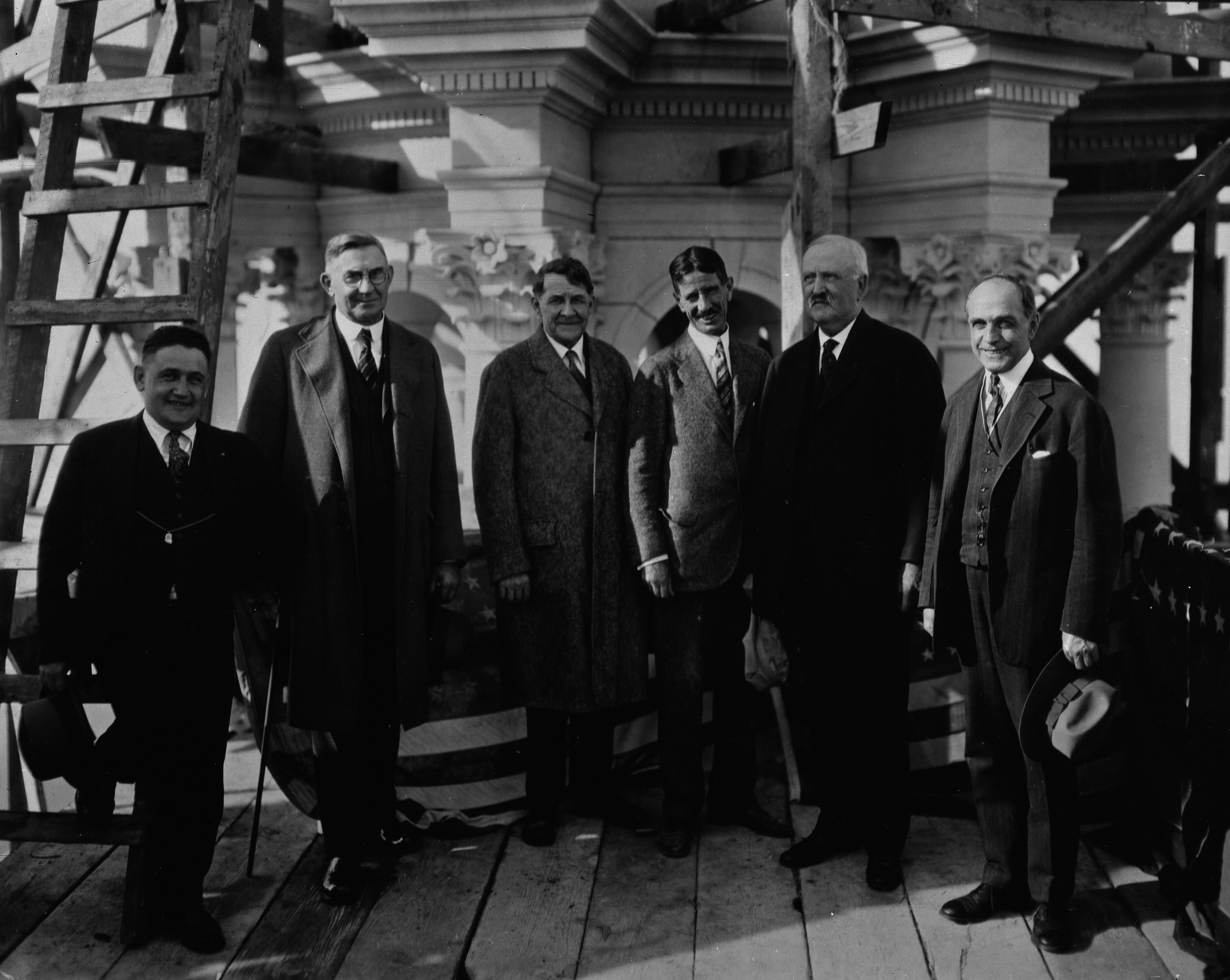
Legislative Building topping-out ceremonies, October 13, 1926.

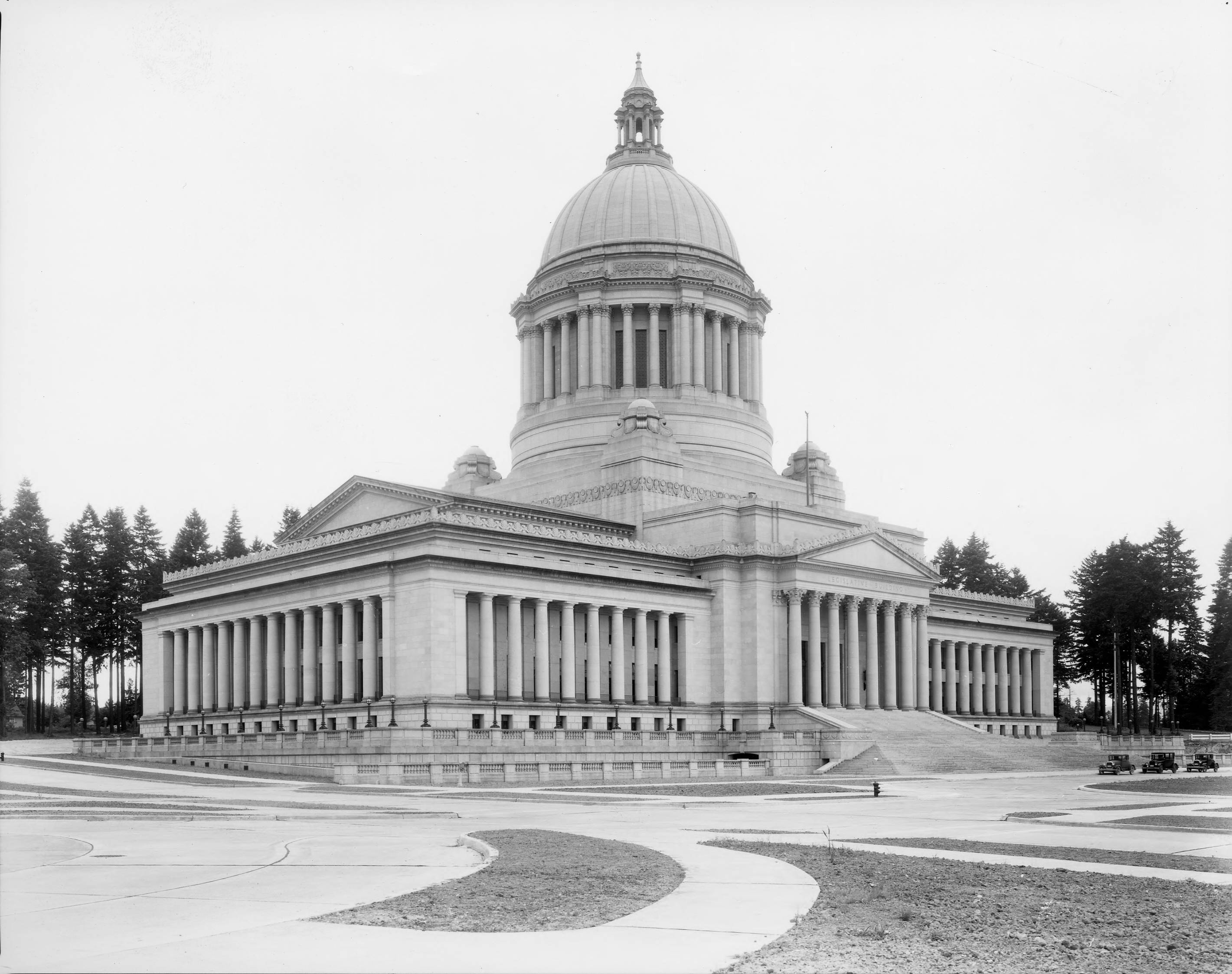
Legislative Building, c. 1927

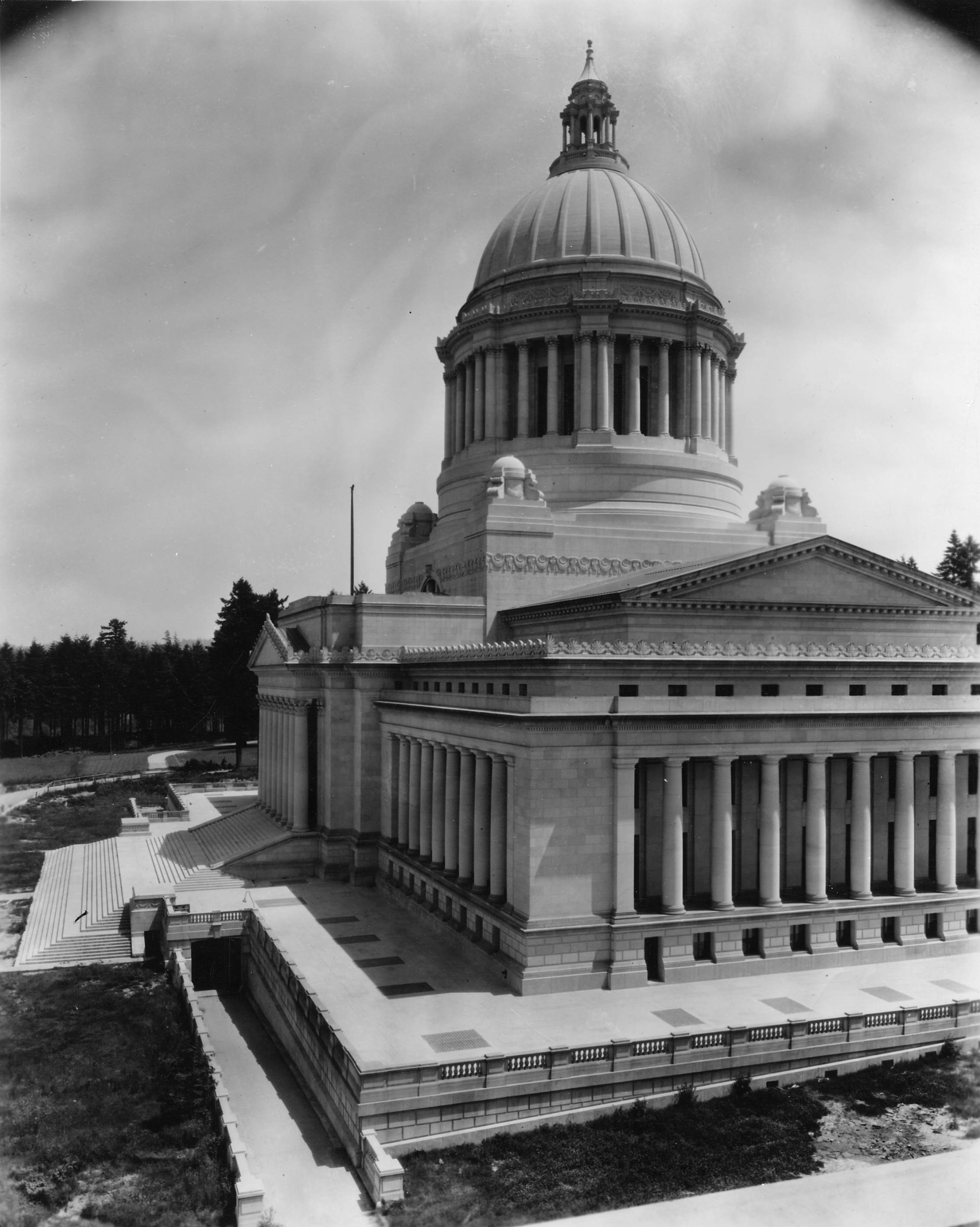
Legislative Building, right wing, c. 1927

== See also ==
- List of state and territorial capitols in the United States
- List of tallest domes
- Old Capitol Building (Olympia, Washington)
- History of Olympia, Washington
