= Medal of Honor Memorial (Olympia, Washington) =

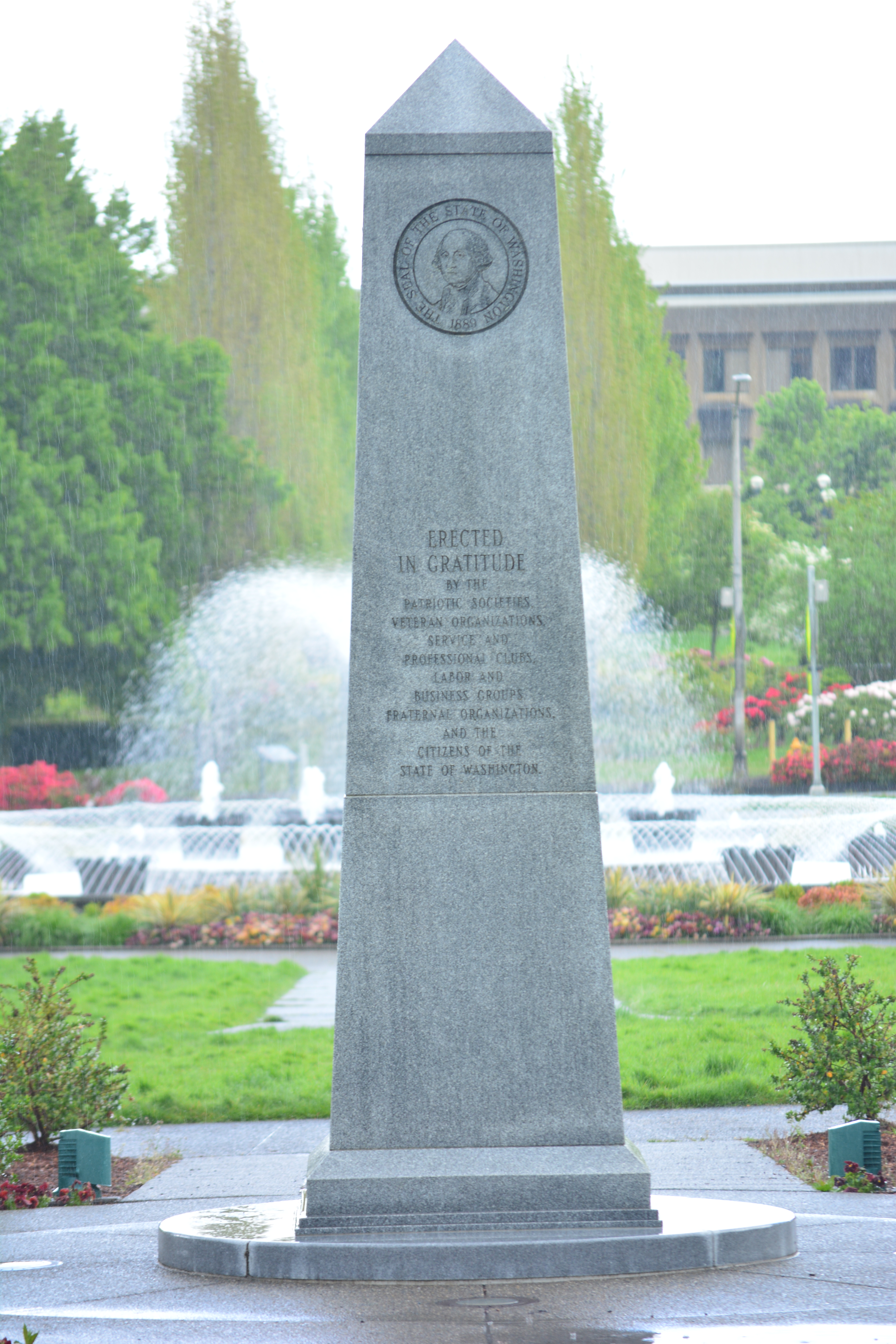
- The memorial in 2020
- Interactive map of Medal of Honor Memorial
- Location: Olympia, Washington
- Coordinates: 47.036536°N 122.902674°W
- Type: Memorial
- Material: Granite
- Dedicated date: November 7, 1976

The Medal of Honor Memorial is installed on the Washington State Capitol campus in Olympia, Washington, United States. The granite obelisk was dedicated on November 7, 1976.
