= Billboard =

Advertising signage

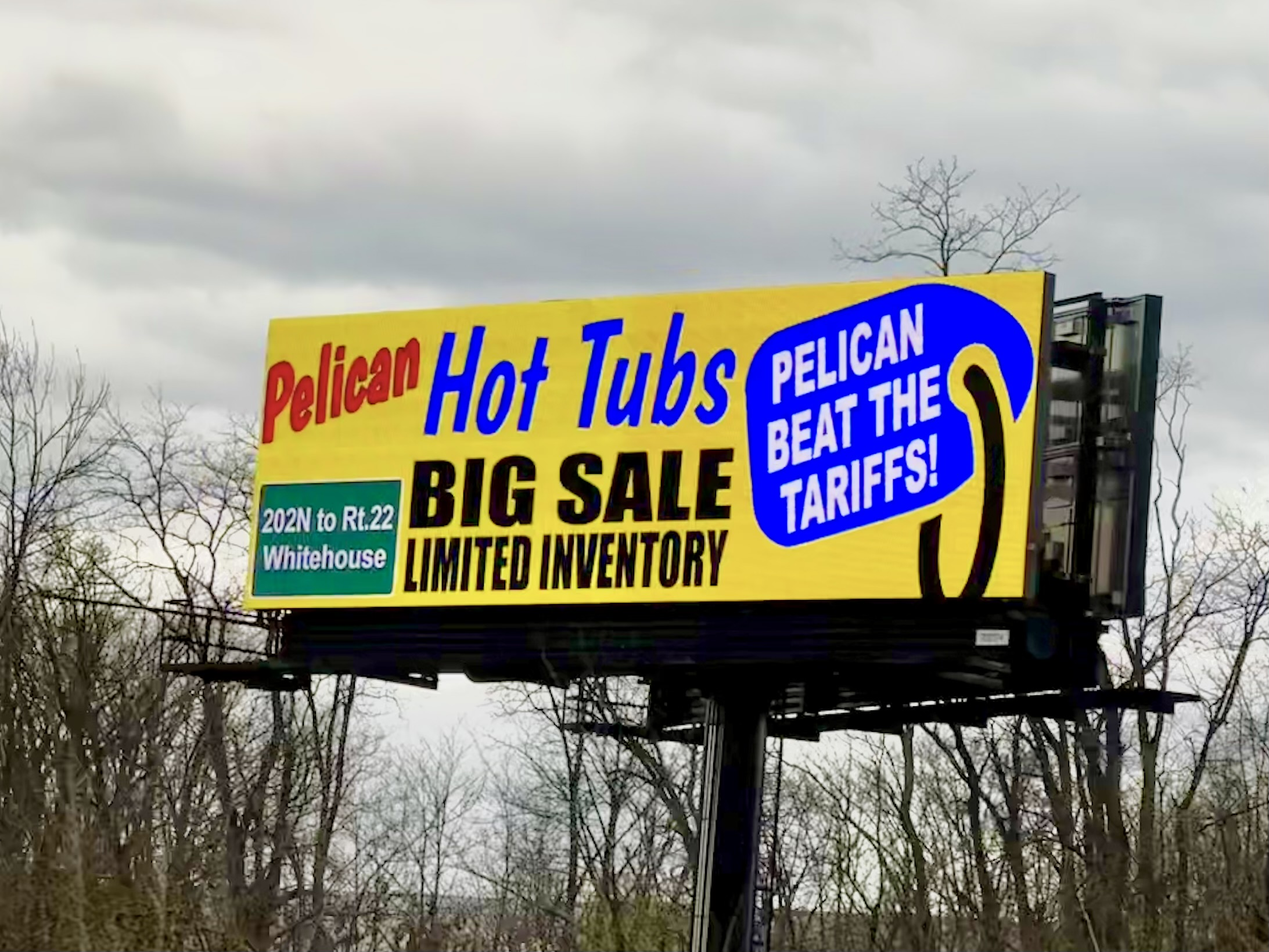
Billboard for a hot tub company in New Jersey

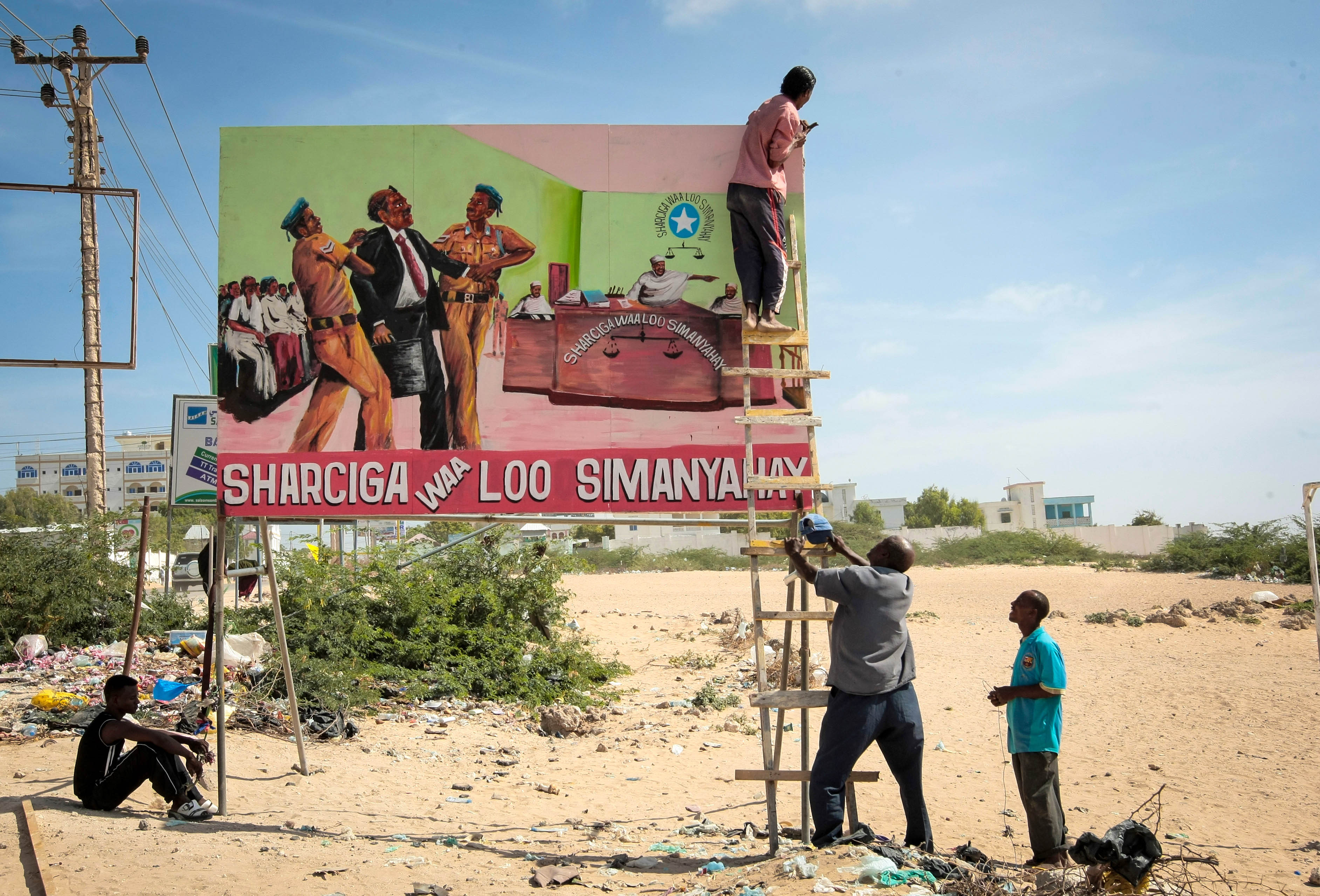
A billboard mural (translated as "Before the law, all people were equal") being fixed into place by a cooperative of artists along the approach road to Aden Adde International Airport

A billboard (also called a bill-board, a billing board, or a hoarding in the UK) is a large outdoor advertising structure, typically found in high-traffic areas such as alongside busy roads. Billboards present large advertisements to passing pedestrians and drivers. Typically brands use billboards to build their brands or to push for their new products.

The largest ordinary-sized billboards are located primarily on major highways, expressways, or principal arterials, and command high-density consumer exposure (mostly to vehicular traffic). These afford the greatest visibility due not only to their size, but because they allow creative "customizing" through extensions and embellishments.

Posters are another common form of billboard advertising, located mostly along primary and secondary arterial roads. Posters are in a smaller format and are viewed primarily by residents and commuter traffic, with some pedestrian exposure.

== Advertising style ==
Billboard advertisements are designed to catch a person's attention and create a memorable impression very quickly, leaving the reader thinking about the advertisement after they have driven past it. They have to be readable in a very short time because they are usually read while being passed at high speeds. Thus there are usually only a few words, in large print, and a humorous or arresting image in brilliant color.

Some billboard designs spill outside the actual space given to them by the billboard, with parts of figures hanging off the billboard edges or jutting out of the billboard in three dimensions. An example in the United States around the turn of the 21st century was the Chick-fil-A billboards (a chicken sandwich fast food chain), which had three-dimensional cow figures in the act of painting the billboards with misspelled anti-beef slogans such as "friends don't let friends eat beef."

The first "scented billboard", an outdoor sign emitting the odors of black pepper and charcoal to suggest a grilled steak, was erected on NC 150 near Mooresville, North Carolina by the Bloom grocery chain. The sign depicted a giant cube of beef being pierced by a large fork that extended to the ground. The scents were emitted between 7–10 a.m. and 4–7 p.m. from 28 May 2010 through 18 June 2010.

== Types ==
=== Painted ===
Almost all painted billboards were created in large studios. The image was projected on the series of paper panels that made up the billboard. Line drawings were done, then traced with a pounce wheel that created perforated lines. The patterns were then "pounced" onto the board with a chalk-filled pounce bag, marking the outlines of the figures or objects. Using oil paints, artists would use large brushes to paint the image. Once the panels were installed using hydraulic cranes, artists would go up on the installed billboard and touch up the edges between panels. These large, painted billboards were especially popular in Los Angeles where historic firms such as Foster & Kleiser and Pacific Outdoor Advertising dominated the industry. Eventually, these painted billboards gave way to graphic reproduction, but hand-painted billboards are still in use in some areas where only a single board or two is required. The "Sunset Strip" in Los Angeles is one area where hand-painted billboards can still be found, usually to advertise upcoming films or albums.

A technical invention called "trivision" allowed three different images to be rotated for presentation.

=== Digital ===
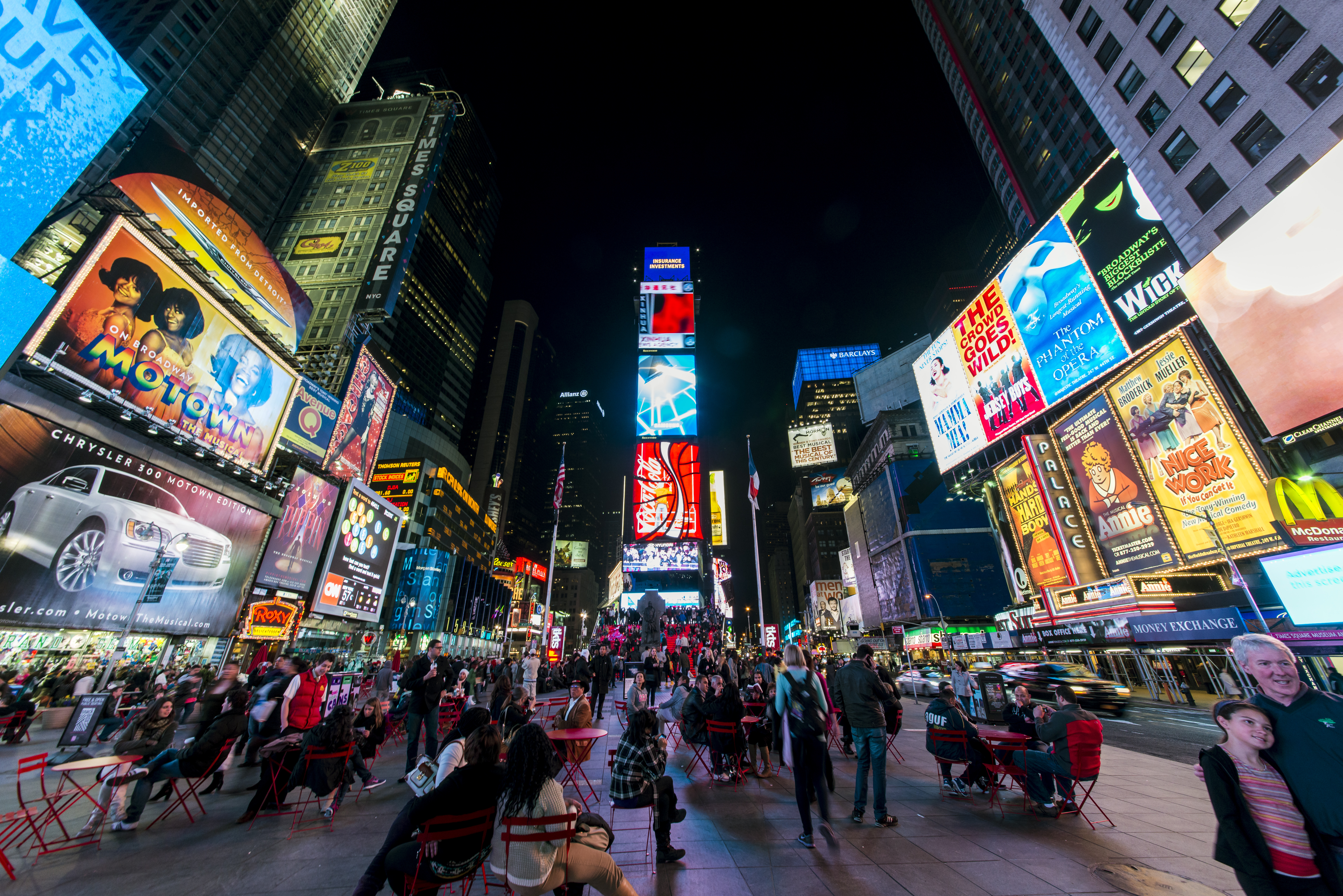
Digital billboards abound in Times Square, Manhattan

A digital billboard shows varying imagery and text created with computer programs and software. Digital billboards can be designed to display running text, have several different displays from the same company, or provide several companies with a certain time slot during the day. Flexible and real-time scheduling can decrease traditional upkeep and maintenance costs, and some billboards may measure audiences or serve dynamic content.

Using digital billboards dynamically has come to be known as programmatic out-of-home advertising. Billboard posters can play audio using conductive ink—when touched, the posters begin to play sounds. Digital billboards can also employ three-dimensional (3D) effects.

=== Mobile ===
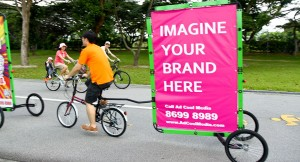
Mobile billboard in East Coast Park, Singapore

Outdoor advertising, such as a mobile billboard, is effective because it is difficult to ignore. According to a UK national survey, it is also memorable. Capitol Communications Group found that 81.7% of those polled recalled images they saw on a moving multi-image sign. This is compared to a 19% retention rate for static signs.

Unlike a typical billboard, mobile billboards are able to go directly to their target audience. They can be placed wherever there is heavy foot traffic due to an event – including convention centers, train stations, airports, and sports arenas. They can repeat routes, ensuring that an advertiser's message is not only noticed but that information is retained through repetition.

=== Multi-purpose ===
Billboards may be multi-purpose. An advertising sign can integrate its main purpose with a telecommunications antenna or public lighting support. Usually, the structure has a steel pole with a coupling flange on the above-fitted advertising billboard structure that can contain telecommunications antennas. The lighting, wiring, and antennas are placed inside the structure.

=== Other ===
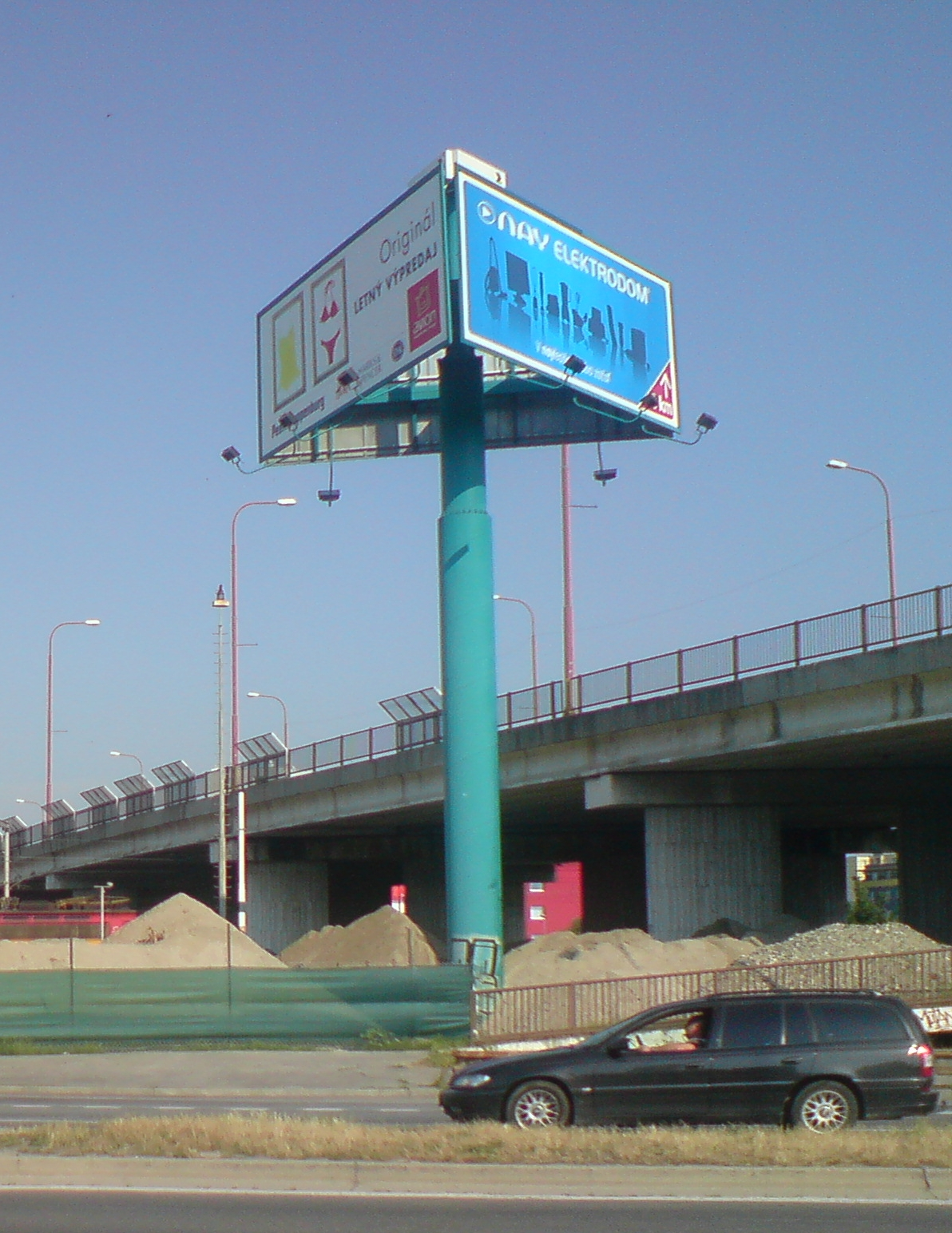
Three-sided

Common along highways are free-standing two-sided as well as three-sided billboards. Other types of billboards include the billboard bicycle attached to the back of a bicycle or the mobile billboard, a special advertising trailer to hoist big banners. Mechanical billboards display three different messages, with three advertisements attached to a conveyor inside the billboard. There are also three-dimensional billboards, such as the ones at Piccadilly Circus, London. Traditional billboards consist of a large format advertisement printed on a resistant material such as vinyl; this is placed on a large metal structure, which makes it one of the media with the most visibility and high impact within the advertising field.

== Placement ==
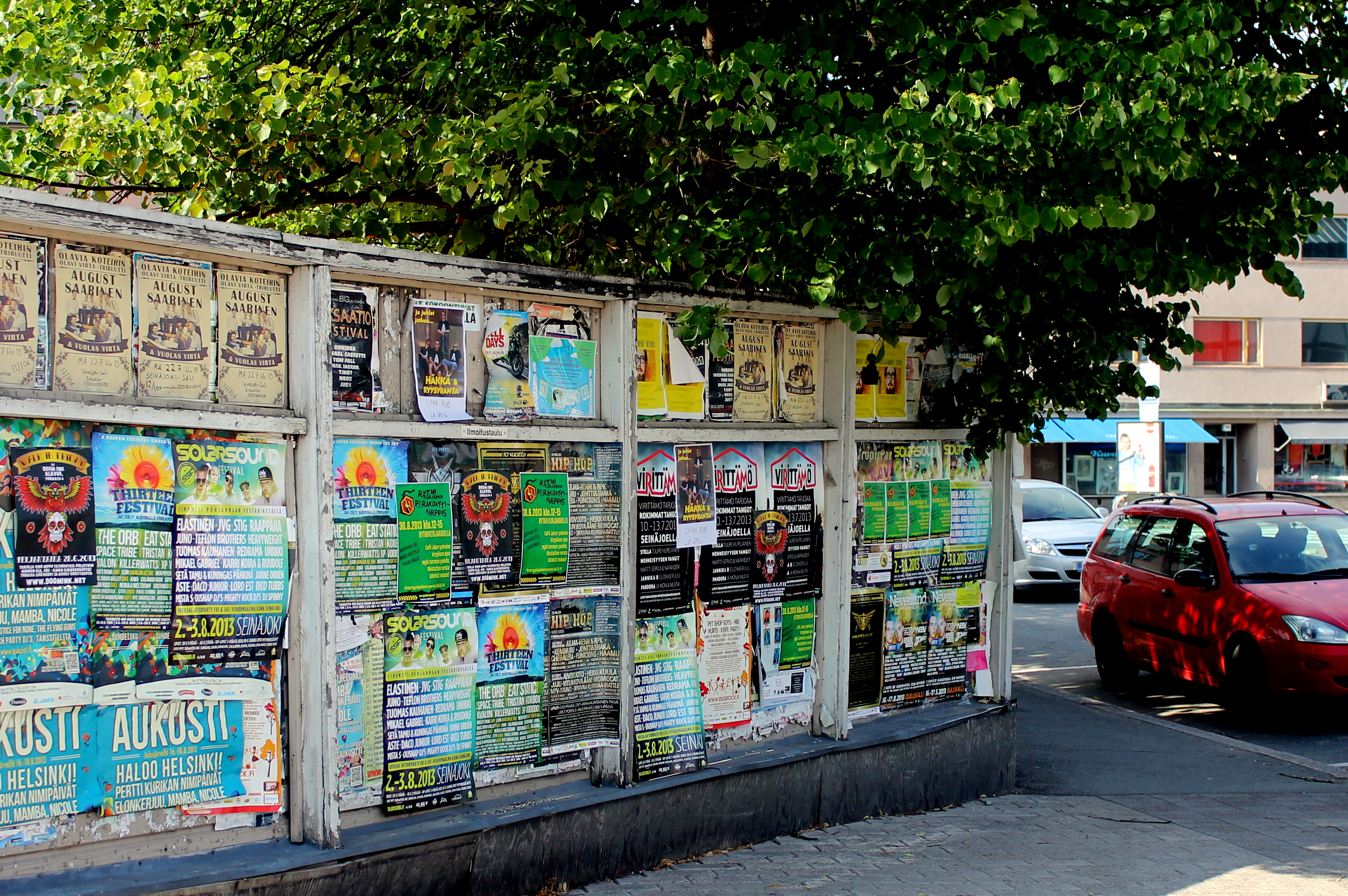
A billboard for attachable paper ads near the market square in Seinäjoki, Finland

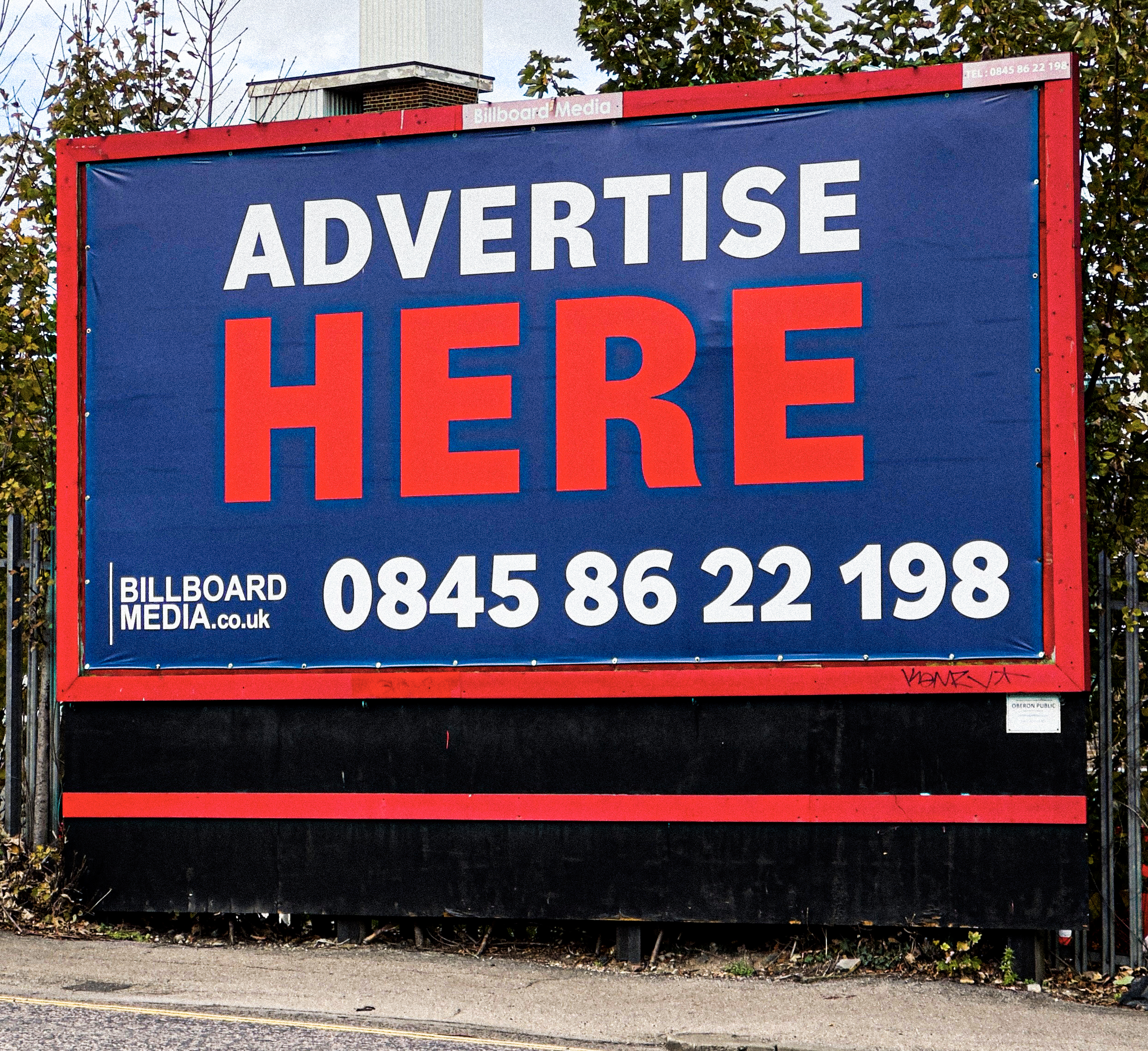
A billboard in Chatham, Kent, England

Some of the most prominent billboards are alongside highways; since passing drivers typically have little to occupy their attention, the impact of the billboard is greater. Billboards are often drivers' primary method of finding lodging, food, and fuel on unfamiliar highways. There were approximately 450,000 billboards on US highways in 1991. Somewhere between 5,000 and 15,000 are erected each year. Current numbers are put at 368,263, according to the OAAA (Outdoor Advertising Association of America). In Europe billboards are a major component and source of income in urban street furniture concepts.

An interesting use of billboards unique to highways was the Burma-Shave advertisements between 1925 and 1963, which had 4- or 5-part messages on multiple signs, keeping the reader hooked by the promise of a punchline at the end. This example is in the National Museum of American History at the Smithsonian Institution:

Shaving brushes
You'll soon see 'em
On a shelf
In some museum
Burma-Shave

These sorts of multi-sign advertisements are no longer common, though they are not extinct. One example, advertising for the NCAA, depicts a basketball player aiming a shot on one billboard; on the next one, 90 yards (82 meters) away, is the basket. Another example is the numerous billboards advertising the roadside attraction South of the Border near Dillon, SC, along I-95 in many states.

Many cities have high densities of billboards, especially where there is dense pedestrian traffic—Times Square in New York City is a good example. Because of the lack of space in cities, these billboards are placed on the sides of buildings and sometimes are free-standing billboards hanging above buildings. Billboards on the sides of buildings create different stylistic opportunities, with artwork that incorporates features of the building into the design, such as using windows as eyes, or for gigantic frescoes that adorn the entire building.

=== Visual and environmental concerns ===
Many groups such as Scenic America have complained that billboards on highways cause excessive clearing of trees and intrude on the surrounding landscape, with billboards' bright colors, lights, and large fonts making it difficult to focus on anything else, making them a form of visual pollution—a state of affairs evoked pithily in Ogden Nash's parody of Joyce Kilmer's oft-quoted poem "Trees":

I think that I shall never see
A billboard lovely as a tree
Indeed, unless the billboards fall
I'll never see a tree at all.

Other groups believe that billboards and advertising contribute negatively to the mental climate of a culture by promoting products as providing feelings of completeness, wellness, and popularity to motivate purchase. B.U.G.A. U.P. was a movement that commenced in Australia and took direct action against primarily tobacco and alcohol billboards. Another focal point for this sentiment would be the magazine AdBusters, which will often showcase politically motivated billboard and other advertising vandalism, called culture jamming. Billboards have been criticized as an example of attention theft.

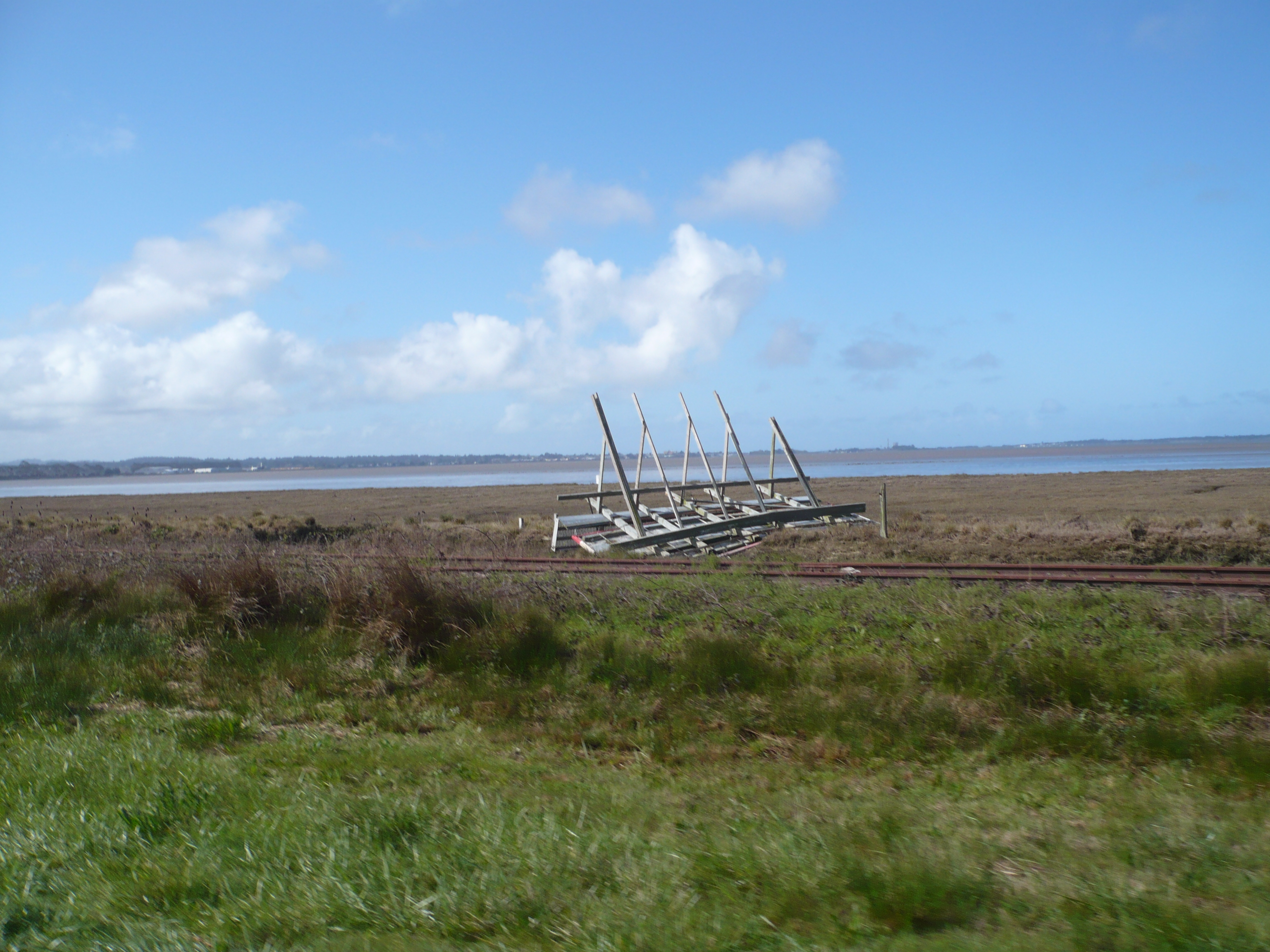
This is one of three contested billboards in the coastal zone of Humboldt Bay that were cut down by an unknown vandal in 2013.

In 2000, rooftops in Athens had grown so thick with billboards that it was difficult to see its famous architecture. In preparation for the 2004 Summer Olympics, the city embarked on a successful four-year project demolishing the majority of rooftop billboards to beautify the city, overcoming resistance from advertisers and building owners. Most of these billboards were illegal but had been ignored until then.

In 2007, São Paulo, Brazil instituted a billboard ban because there were no viable regulations of the billboard industry. Today, São Paulo is working with outdoor companies to rebuild the outdoor infrastructure in a way that will reflect the vibrant business climate of the city while adopting good regulations to control growth.

=== Road safety concerns ===
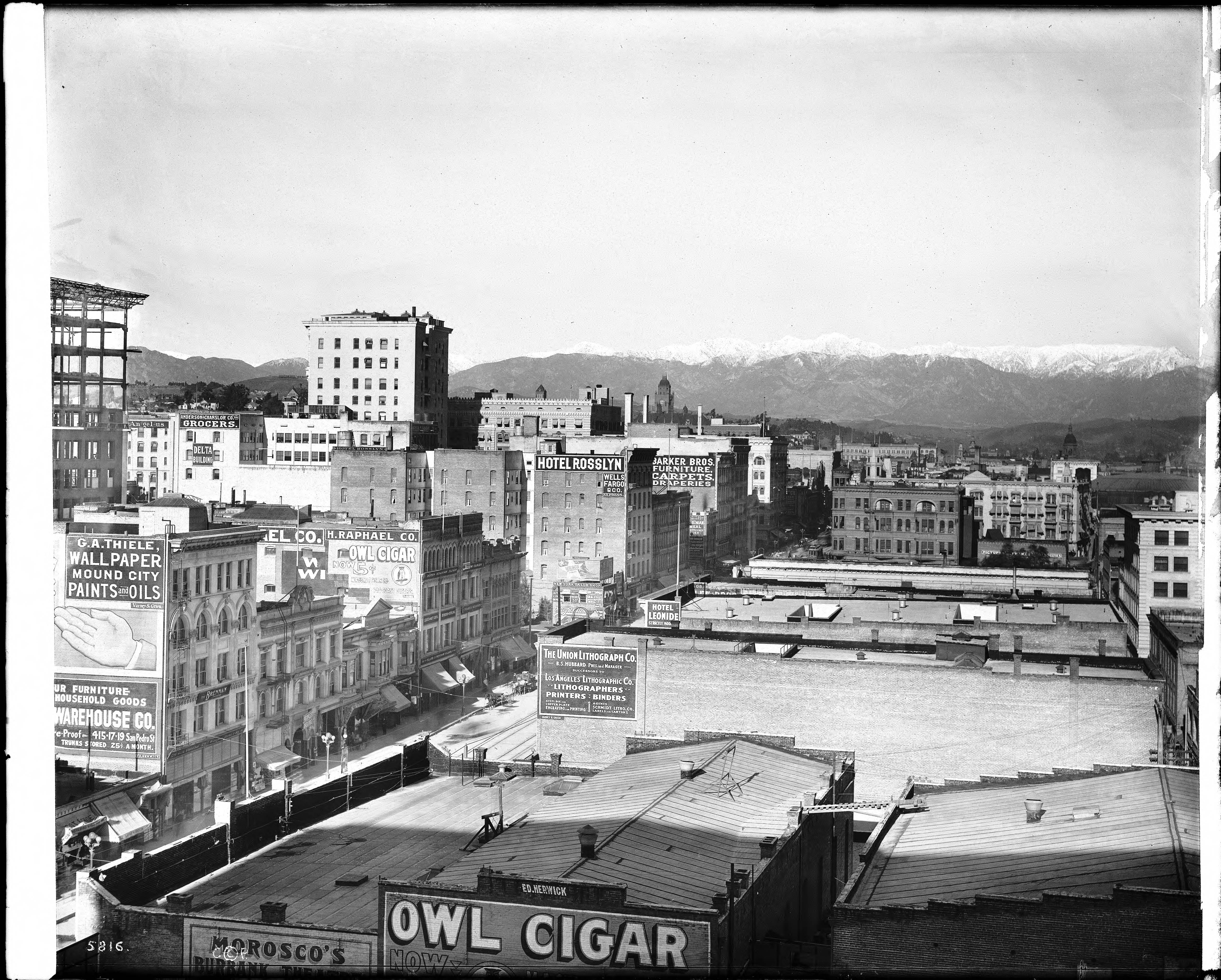
Panoramic view of Los Angeles looking north from the Pacific Electric Building, c. 1 January 1907

The most comprehensive review of the literature to date by the Centre for Accident Research and Road Safety-Queensland (CARRS-Q) (Australia) found that crash risk increases by approximately 25-29% in the presence of digital roadside advertising signs (digital billboard) compared to control areas. There is an emerging trend in the literature suggesting that roadside advertising signs can increase crash risk, particularly for those signs that have the capacity to frequently change (often referred to as digital billboards).

In the US, many cities enacted laws banning billboards as early as 1909 (California Supreme Court, Varney & Green vs. Williams) but the First Amendment has made this difficult. A San Diego law championed by Pete Wilson in 1971 cited traffic safety and driver distraction as the reason for the billboard ban but was narrowly overturned by the Supreme Court in 1981, in part because it banned non-commercial as well as commercial billboards.

=== Legal restrictions ===
Billboards are largely absent in Australia's capital city, Canberra, due to a 1937 ordinance that prohibited unauthorized signs on Commonwealth land. In 2017, the Australian Capital Territory considered relaxing this law to allow more outdoor advertising. An Inquiry into billboards received a record 166 submissions, with only six respondents supporting allowing more advertising in the Territory. The other submissions supported the current laws, or pointed to shortcomings and loopholes of the current laws, such as the allowance of mobile billboards, bus wrap advertising and political campaign signs, as well a failure to enforce existing laws.

In 1964, the negative impact of the over-proliferation of signage was abundantly evident in Houston, Texas, US, and it motivated Lady Bird Johnson to ask her husband to create a law. At the same time, the outdoor advertising industry was becoming aware that excessive signs, some literally blocking another, which was bad for business. In 1965, the Highway Beautification Act was signed into law. The act applied only to "Federal Aid Primary" and "Defense" highways and limited billboards to commercial and industrial zones created by states and municipalities. It required each state to set standards based on "customary use" for the size, lighting, and spacing of billboards and prohibited city and state governments from removing billboards without paying compensation to the owner. The act requires states to maintain "effective control" of billboards or lose 10% of their federal highway dollars.

The act also required the screening of junk yards adjacent to regulated highways.

Around major holidays, volunteer groups erected highway signs offering free coffee at rest stops. These were specifically exempted in the act.

Currently, four states—Vermont, Alaska, Hawaii, and Maine—have prohibited billboards. Vermont's law went into effect in 1968, Hawaii's law went into effect in 1927, Maine's law went into effect in 1977, and Alaska's law went into effect upon its achievement of statehood in 1959.

In the UK, billboards are controlled as adverts as part of the planning system. To display an illegal advert (that is, without planning permission) is a criminal offense with a fine of up to £2500 per offense (per poster). All of the large UK outdoor advertisers such as CBS Outdoor, JCDecaux, Clear Channel, Titan, and Primesight have numerous convictions for such crimes.

In São Paulo, a city of twelve million in Brazil, Billboards and advertising on vehicles have been banned since January 2007. It also restricted the dimensions of advertising on shop fronts.

In British Columbia, a province of Canada, billboards are restricted to 300m away from roadways, the government also retains the right to remove any billboard it deems an unsafe distraction.

In Toronto, a city of over 2 and a half million in Canada, a municipal tax on billboards was implemented in April 2010. A portion of the tax will help fund arts programs in the city.

In Sweden, there is a general ban against billboards within the road area (typically the road plus ditch), except for standardized signs such as gas stations, restaurants, or hotels. But there is no ban against them outside the road if the landowner approves. Many farmers along major routes earn some money from such signs.

== Usages ==
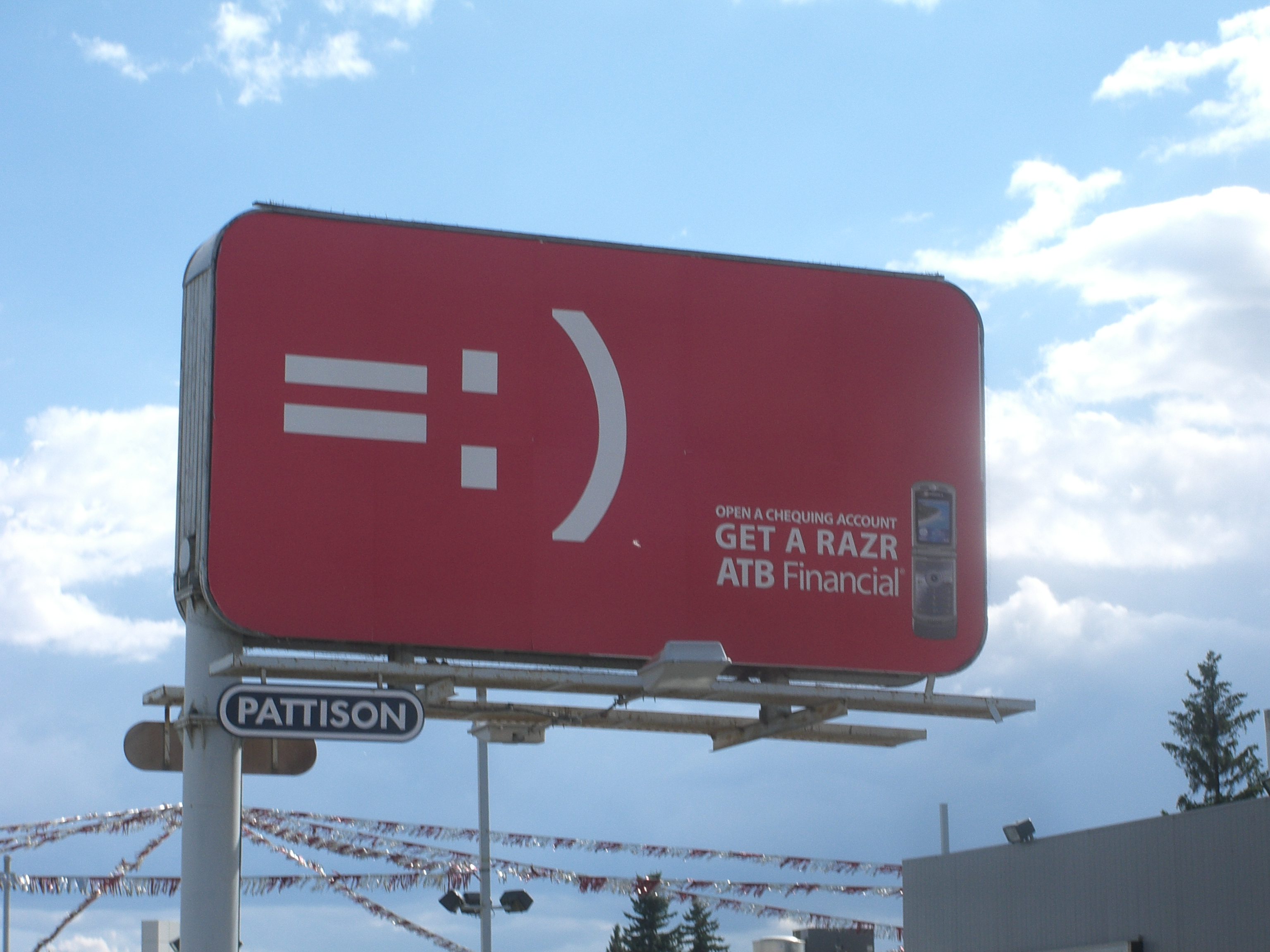
ATB Financial ad, Edmonton

=== Highway ===
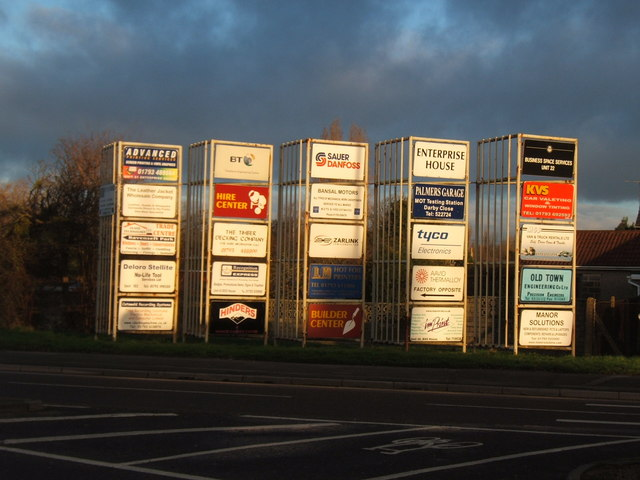
A billboard frame in Swindon, England

Many signs advertise local restaurants and shops in the coming miles and are crucial to drawing business in small towns. One example is Wall Drug, which in 1936 erected billboards advertising "free ice water". The town of Wall, South Dakota, was essentially built around the many thousands of customers per day those billboards brought in (20,000 in 1981). Some signs were placed at great distances, with slogans such as "Only 827 miles to Wall Drug, with FREE ice water." In some areas the signs were so dense that one almost immediately followed the last. This situation changed after the Highway Beautification Act was passed; the proliferation of Wall Drug billboards is sometimes cited as one of the reasons the bill was passed. After the passage of the act, other states (such as Oregon) embarked on highway beautification efforts.

=== Railway ===
Billboard advertising in underground stations, especially, is perhaps a place where they find a greater degree of acceptability and may assist in maintaining a neat, vibrant, and safe atmosphere if not too distracting. Museum Station, Sydney has mounted restored 1940s billboard panels along the platforms that are in keeping with its heritage listing.

=== Big name advertisers ===
Billboards are also used to advertise national or global brands, particularly in more densely populated urban areas. According to the Outdoor Advertising Association of America, the top billboard advertisers in the United States in 2017 were McDonald's, Apple and GEICO. A large number of wireless phone companies, movie companies, car manufacturers and banks are high on the list as well.

=== Tobacco advertising ===
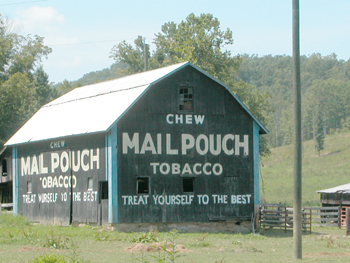
Mail pouch barn advertisement: a bit of Americana in southern Ohio. Mail Pouch painted the barns for free.

Prior to 1999, billboards were a major venue of cigarette advertising; 10% of Michigan billboards advertise alcohol and tobacco, according to the Detroit Free Press. This is particularly true in countries where tobacco advertisements are not allowed in other media. For example, in the US, tobacco advertising was banned on radio and television in 1971, leaving billboards and magazines as some of the last places tobacco could be advertised. Under the 1998 Tobacco Master Settlement Agreement, participating tobacco manufacturers were required to remove their billboard advertisements by April 23, 1999. States were permitted to use the remaining terms of existing billboard leases to display anti-smoking messages. In a parody of the Marlboro Man, some billboards depicted cowboys riding on ranches with slogans like "Bob, I miss my lung."

Likely the best-known of the tobacco advertising boards were those for "Mail Pouch" chewing tobacco in the United States during the first half of the 20th century (pictured adjacent). The company agreed to paint two or three sides of a farmer's barn any color he chose in exchange for painting their advertisement on one or two sides of the structure facing the road. The company has long since abandoned this form of advertising, and none of these advertisements have been painted in many years, but some remain visible on rural highways.

=== Non-commercial use ===
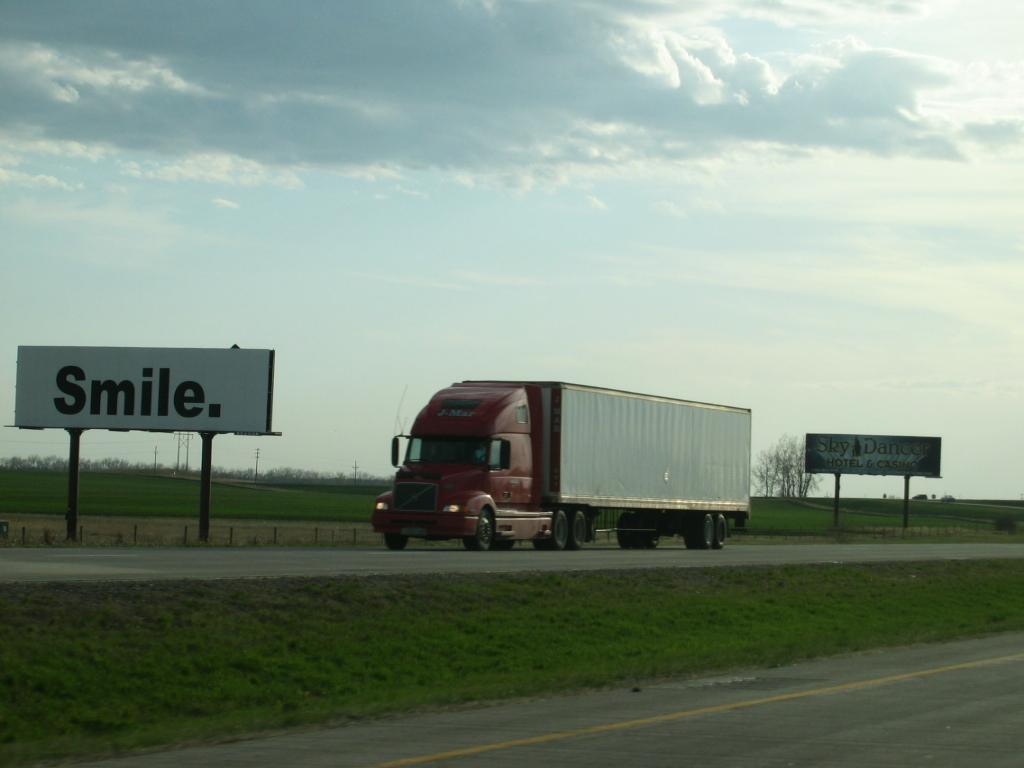
Non-commercial advertisement is used around the world by governments and non-profit organisations to obtain donations, volunteer support or change consumer behavior. North Dakota, May 2004.

Not all billboards are used for advertising products and services—non-profit groups and government agencies use them to communicate with the public. In 1999 an anonymous person created the God Speaks billboard campaign in Florida "to get people thinking about God", with witty statements signed by God. "Don't make me come down there", "We need to talk" and "Tell the children that I love them" were parts of the campaign, which was picked up by the Outdoor Advertising Association of America and continues today on billboards across the country.

South of Olympia, Washington is the privately owned Uncle Sam billboard. It features conservative, sometimes inflammatory messages, changed on a regular basis. Chehalis Farmer Al Hamilton first started the board during the Johnson era, when the government was trying to make him remove his billboards along Interstate 5. He had erected the signs after he lost a legal battle to prevent the building of the freeway across his land. Numerous legal and illegal attempts to remove the Uncle Sam billboard have failed, and it is now in its third location. One message, attacking a nearby liberal arts college, was photographed, made into a postcard, and sold in the College Bookstore.

== Governance ==
The Traffic Audit Bureau for Media Measurement Incorporated. (TAB Incorporated) was established in 1933 as a non-profit organization whose historical mission has been to audit the circulation of out-of-home media in the United States. TAB's role has expanded to lead and support other major out-of-home industry research initiatives. Governed by a tripartite board composed of advertisers, agencies, and media companies, the TAB acts as an independent auditor for traffic circulation in accordance with guidelines established by its board of directors.

Similarly, in Canada, the Canadian Outdoor Measurement Bureau (COMB) was formed in 1965 as a non-profit organization independently operated by representatives composed of advertisers, advertising agencies, and members of the Canadian out-of-home advertising industry. COMB is charged with the verification of traffic circulation for the benefit of the industry and its users.

== History ==
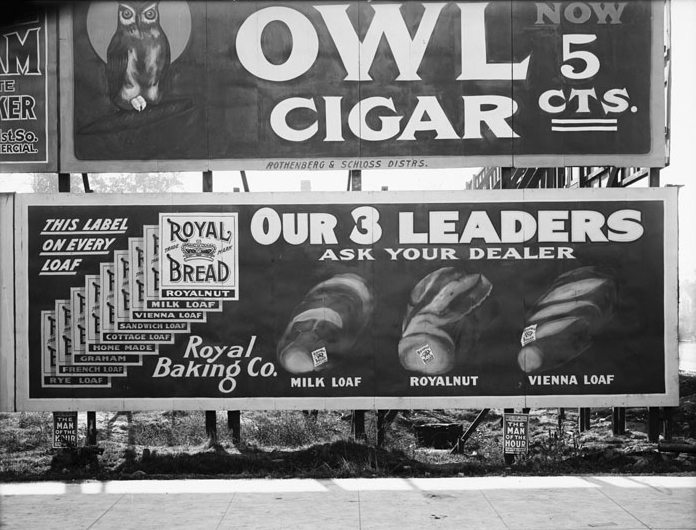
1908 billboard, Salt Lake City, Utah

Early billboards basically displayed groups of large posters on the sides of buildings, with limited but still appreciable commercial value. As eyeballs, roads and highways multiplied, the billboard business thrived.

- Late 15th century: Flyposting was practiced in Europe.
- 1796: Alois Senefelder, working in Bavaria, introduced lithography, which allowed the mass production of posters.
- 1835: Jared Bell was making 9 × 6 posters for the circus in the U.S.
- 1862: Formation of the United Kingdom Billposting Association.
- 1867: Earliest known billboard rentals
- 1871: Fredrick Walker designed one of the first art posters.
- 1872: Outdoor Advertising Association of America established as a billboard-lobbying group.
- 1889: The world's first 24-sheet billboard was displayed at the Paris Exposition and later at the 1893 World's Columbian Exposition in Chicago. The format was quickly adopted for various types of advertising, especially for circuses, traveling shows, and movies.
- Early 1900s: Poster-art schools were established in England, Austria, and Germany.
- 1908: The Model T automobile was introduced in the U.S., increasing the number of people using highways and therefore the reach of roadside billboards.
- 1919: Japanese candy company Glico introduced its building-spanning billboard, the Glico Man.
- 1925: Burma-Shave made billboards lining the highways.
- 1936: The Wall Drug billboards started to go up nationwide.
- 1960: The mechanized Kani Doraku billboard was built in Dotonbori, Osaka.
- 1965: The Highway Beautification Act was passed after much campaigning by Lady Bird Johnson.
- 1969: The Public Health Cigarette Smoking Act banned cigarette ads in television and radio, moving that business into billboards.
- 1981: The United States Supreme Court overturned a San Diego billboard ban, but left room open for other cities to ban commercial billboards.
- 1986: Non-television advertising became restricted—non-television adverts could not show people smoking. This meant that Benson & Hedges and Silk Cut, amongst other brands, advertised their cigarettes through increasingly indirect and obscure campaigns to a point where they became recognizable.
- 1998: The four major U.S. tobacco companies signed the Tobacco Master Settlement Agreement, which eliminated billboard advertising of cigarettes in all of the United States.
- 2007: The industry adopted one-sheet plastic poster replacement for paper poster billboards and began the phase-out of PVC flexible vinyl, replacing it with eco-plastics such as polyethylene.
- 2010: The first "scented billboard", emitting odors similar to charcoal and black pepper to suggest a steak grilling, was erected in Mooresville, North Carolina by the Bloom grocery chain to promote the sale of beef.
- 2010: Augmented billboards were introduced in the Transmediale Festival 2010 in Berlin using Artvertiser.

== Notable examples ==
- Alexander Shunnarah billboards, Alabama
- Boston Citgo sign, Boston, Massachusetts
- Coca-Cola billboard in Kings Cross, Sydney, Australia
- Coca-Cola sign, Times Square, Manhattan, NYC
- Hollywood Sign, Hollywood, Los Angeles, CA
- Monarch advertising sign, Santiago, Chile
- Osborne bull figures in Spain
- Paddy Power Cleeve Hill Sign, Cheltenham, England
- Piccadilly Circus illuminated signs, London, England
- Valdivieso advertising sign, Santiago, Chile

== See also ==
- Billboard hacking – Illegal alteration of a billboard
- Human billboard – Person who applies an advertisement on themselves
