= List of Uncle Sam billboard messages =

Uncle Sam billboard
- Uncle Sam billboard, as of August 2026
- Location: Napavine, Washington

Messages on the Uncle Sam billboard, of which there have been four iterations, were first posted by the Alfred Hamilton family in the late 1960s. The statements, which usually followed a conservative viewpoint, continued into 2025. That year, the Confederated Tribes of the Chehalis Reservation purchased the billboard and surrounding property, displaying their first message in October 2025. (Note: The use of punctuation for each messages listed throughout the article is based on how the statements are written in the sources. Any message where the punctuation is unclear, or a discrepancy exists between sources, the article relies on a period to end each statement.)

== First Uncle Sam billboards, 1960s to 1995 ==
Along with his statements, Alfred Hamilton advertised his turkey business on the billboard located at his farm in the late 1960s. During the 1970s, the billboard also advertised Hamilton's cattle business. The first painting of Uncle Sam was added to the billboard around 1970. (Note: The Uncle Sam painting on the early versions of the feature is sometimes referred to as a drawing. See sources throughout the article.)

The first messages on the sign often contained posts in opposition to the funding of welfare programs; the early statements have been reported to have begun at the behest of his wife, Ruth, who became informed that welfare concerns were allotted more state funds than the school system.

Message	Year	Side	Image	Context and Notes
There are no billboards in Russia!	1967			Posted in November 1967, the message is the first statement recorded in sources regarding the original Hamilton billboard. The word, "no", was bolded and the message used a backwards "R" in the spelling of Russia, mirroring the alphabet of that country. A similar message, possibly posted at a later time, was recorded as, "State Gov't. vs. free expression. There are no billboards in Russia or Red China".
Gun control (Registration) is "people control". Land control (land use planning) is "people control".	1970s			
Hello Americans! We're glad to be back.	1970s			
Let's keep the Canal and give them Kissinger.	1970s			Hamilton declared this his favorite message. (Note: The Panama Canal posting is also recorded as, "Don’t give canal to Panama, give them Kissinger".)
SB2417 repeals the "Forest Practices Act". Sign initiative 309, repeal Shoreline Management Act.	1970s			
Should we trust computer balloting?	1970s			
Who would work so hard to gain ‘People Control?’ Urge legislators to repeal the 'Forest Practices Act'.	1970s			
Why Spend Millions to replace Green Hill School?	1970s			
Women are meant to be cherished not liberated.	1970s			
Why did Julia vote 'no' on Voluntary Prayer Amendment?	1973			The statement was directed toward Julia Butler Hansen, a Lewis County representative of the United States House of Representatives at the time.
Be thankful you live in America. Thanksgiving is more than a turkey.	1974			
Can we afford the Department of Ecology?	1974			
Hi Folks! Hope you missed us like we missed you.	1974			Posted by December 1974 after the build of the third billboard.
Less gov't and more responsibility in 1974	1974			Unveiled on New Year's Day, 1974.
Can we afford another Kissinger peace?	1975			Posted by October 1975 along with "We paid for the Panama Canal" message by October 1975.
We paid for the Panama Canal. Let's keep it.	1975			Placed by October 1975 along with "Can we afford another Kissinger peace" message.
Join your local TRIM committee.	1977			TRIM was an acronym for, Tax Relief Immediately.
This sign on trial Nov. 3-4 Lewis Co. Courthouse.	1977	Northbound		Posted in advance of the 1977 trial.
Bill Caruth tells why you must stick to your guns.	1978			Message agreeing with statements in opposition to gun control.
Russia will lie, cheat and manipulate us in treaty talks.	1985			
Evergreen State College- Home of environmental terrorists and homos?	1987			In response to a LGBTQ film festival held at Evergreen State College. The message is also recorded to have been posted in 1988.
AIDS, the miracle disease. It turns fruits into vegetables.	1987	Southbound		Commenting on the AIDS crisis during the 1980s.
Lewis Co. Air Show, Sunday Aug. 2, Excitement and thrills.	1987	Southbound		Message that replaced the AIDS statement. (Note: In a response by a writer for the Seattle Times, the "Lewis Co. Air Show" message wasn't worthy of a mention in Bartlett's Familiar Quotations but compared to the prior statement regarding AIDS, the missive was a "literary gem".)
Governors Like Lowry Don't Grow On Trees. They Swing From Them.	approx. 1993-1995			In opposition to Washington state governor, Mike Lowry, posted between 1993 and 1995.
...twenty-sex years.	1995			An incomplete recording of Hamilton's last message on the pre-1996 billboard; meant to thank politician Bob Packwood for his service.
Are Kissinger and Castro on the same team?	NA			
Get U.S. out of the United Nations.	NA			
If you're insane, go to the state capitol. No one will notice.	NA			
Land control is a step toward ‘People Control.’ Barbershop harmony R.E. Bennett School, March 14 and 15.	NA			
Non-Red or Pink Springer for sale. Non-Communist straw for sale.	NA			A pink springer is in reference to pregnant cows. The statements may have either been combined into one message, or displayed separately on either side of the billboard.

== Uncle Sam billboard, 1996-2025 ==
The depiction of Uncle Sam on the 1996 billboard has been repainted at least twice.

Message	Year	Side	Image	Context and Notes
Seems a little queer.	1990s			Response to Washington state laws banning discrimination against LGBTQ state employees.
Clinton's 2 for 1 special will trade lies and promises for votes.	1996	Northbound		Along with a welcome statement for President Bill Clinton, the message is the second to be displayed on the 1996 billboard.
Lewis County welcomes the President of the United States.	1996	Southbound		Greeting for President Clinton during a visit to the area in September 1996. Ruth Hamilton, when asked about the Clinton messages, stated, "We honor the office of the president, but not the person".
Hasn't Gregoire cost taxpayers plenty of $ $ in boo-boos?	2004			Hamilton's last message before his death in November 2004.
Taxation without representation? We now have confiscation without compensation!	2006	Northbound		
Don't like NAFTA? Hate CAFTA? Watch your income decline: Security and prosperity partnership!	2006	Northbound		
In the race for president can I just vote no?	2007	Southbound		
Where's the birth certificate?	approx. 2009-2012			Message refers to the birtherism conspiracy theory regarding President Barack Obama's status as a U.S. citizen.
How much of what you earned last year did you get to keep?	2017	Northbound		
Oh, no! A virus! Quick - burn the Bill of Rights!	2020			Posted during the COVID-19 pandemic.
How many Americans will we leave behind in Ukraine?	2021-2025	Northbound		Part of the last two messages posted by the Hamilton family.
No one died in WW2 so you could show papers to buy food.	2021-2025	Southbound		Part of the last two messages posted by the Hamilton family.
If China invades where will we get the money for our defense?	NA			
Public library: A great place for your kids to meet sexual deviants.	NA			
You get to choose: murders & beheadings; or a protected border.	NA			

== Confederated Tribes of the Chehalis Reservation, 2025-present ==
In June 2025, the Confederated Tribes of the Chehalis Reservation purchased the billboard. The remaining political messages posted by the Hamilton family were removed; no definitive future plans for the billboard were announced.

Message	Year	Side	Image	Context and Notes
NATIVE LAND – #CHEHALIS	2025-present	Northbound		The phrase was noted by the Chehalis tribe to be "innocuous" and a "statement of fact", and that "no controversy or hidden meaning" was behind the updated sign.

== Gallery ==
Additional photos, Uncle Sam billboard

June 2013

August 2021
