= Alfred Hamilton =

Alfred Hamilton may refer to:

- Alfred Hamilton (farmer) (1920–2004), American farmer and businessman in Napavine, Washington
- Alfred Starr Hamilton (1914–2005), American poet
- Alfred B. Hamilton, established a whiskey trading post with John Healy in 1869

== See also ==
- Alfred Douglas-Hamilton, 13th Duke of Hamilton (1862–1940), Scottish nobleman and sailor
