= Patricia Anne Morton =

American Foreign Service specialist (1935–2019)

- Born: May 30, 1935; Centralia, Washington, U.S.
- Died: October 16, 2019 (aged 84); Washington, D.C., U.S.
- Resting place: Napavine Cemetery, Napavine, Washington
- Employer: U.S. Department of State
- Known for: Politics; Diplomacy; Federal law enforcement

Patricia Anne Morton (May 30, 1935 – October 16, 2019) was an American Foreign Service specialist. She was the first woman to serve as a Diplomatic Security special agent. She also served as the deputy director and manager of the Federal Women's Program.

== Biography ==
Patricia (nickname, "Patti") Anne Morton was born in Centralia, Washington, May 30, 1935. Her parents were Russell and Clara (Haase) Morton.

She graduated from Napavine High School in Napavine, Washington, in 1952. She earned a bachelor's degree from Western Washington University in 1957.

For three years, she worked as a secretary for Albert Rosellini, former governor of Washington.

In 1965, she was accepted into the United States Foreign Service. Her assignments included Nepal, Kinshasa, Cameroon, Singapore, and Saigon. In 1972, she became the first woman to serve as a Diplomatic Security special agent. Later, she became the deputy director and manager of the Federal Women's Program.

Morton died in Washington, D.C., on October 16, 2019. Her blue clutch bag, used to carry her .357 Magnum pistol during her assignment at the Washington field office, was donated to the National Museum of American Diplomacy.
