= Monarch advertising sign =

Coordinates: 33°26′30″S 70°37′59″W

- Letrero publicitario de Monarch
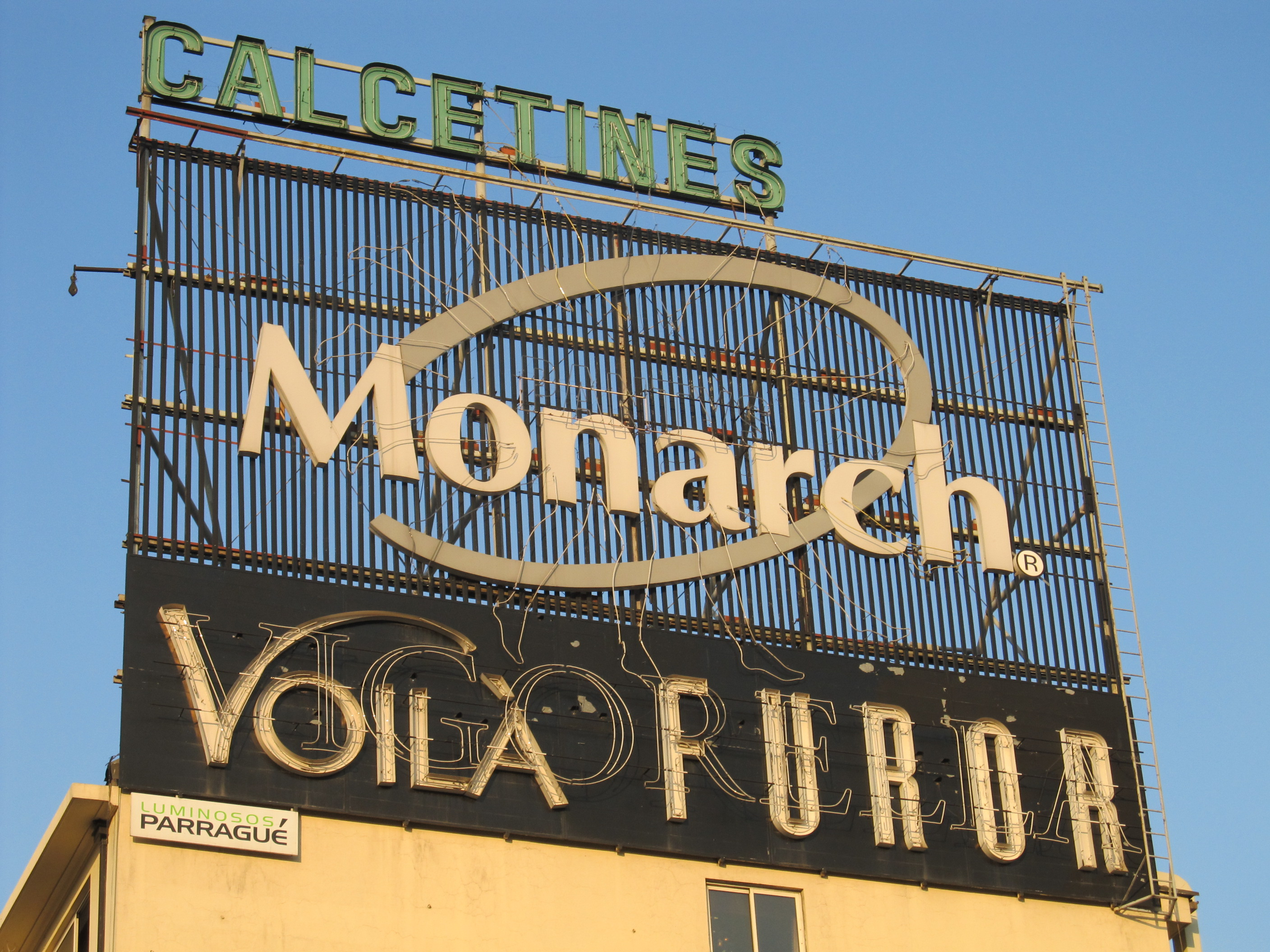
- Monarch advertising sign
- Interactive map of Monarch advertising sign
- Location: 51 Rancagua Street, Santiago, Chile
- Material: Neon lighting
- 2169

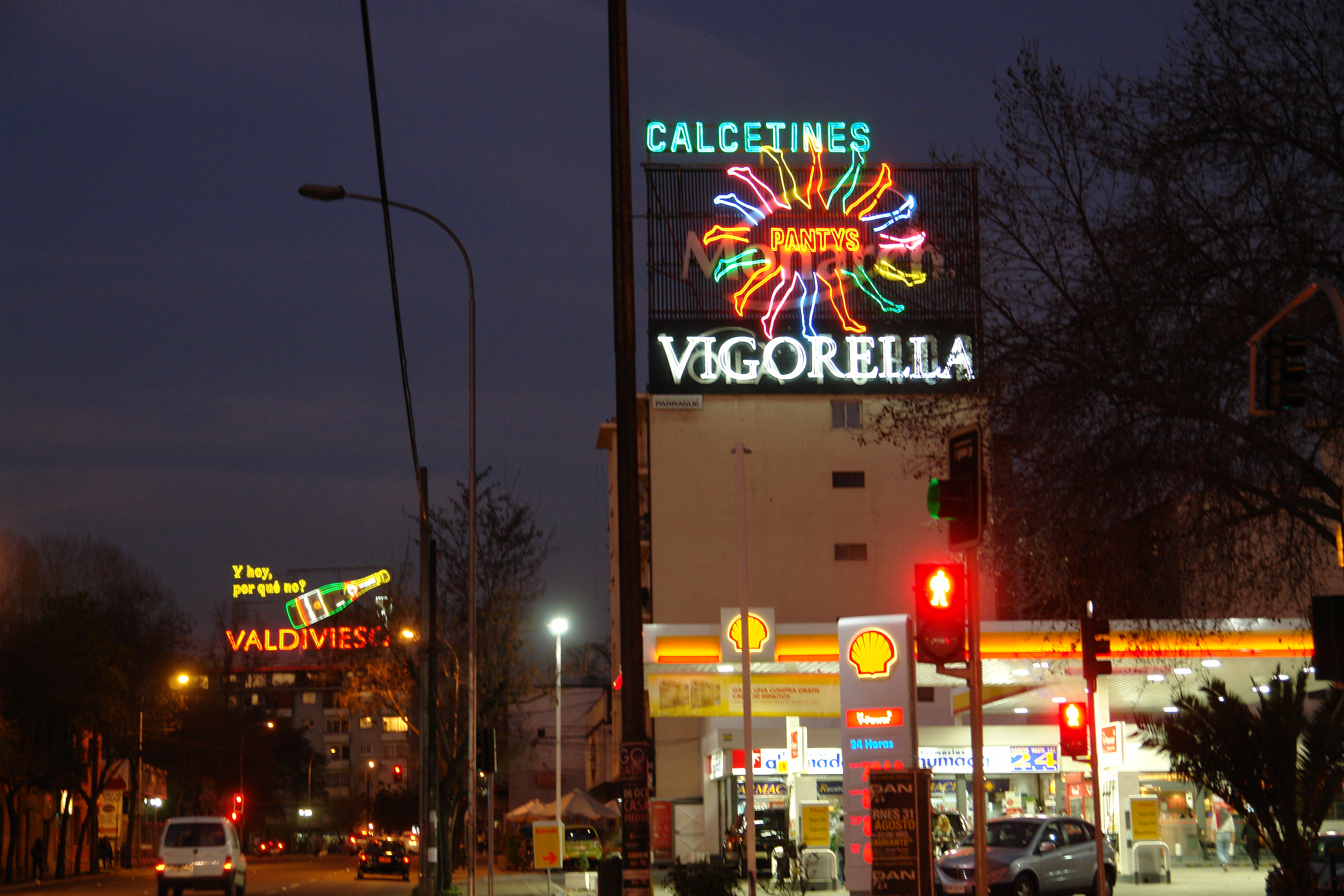
View of the Monarch sign at night, from Rancagua Street. At the distance can see the Valdivieso advertising sign.

The Monarch advertising sign (letrero publicitario de Monarch in Spanish) is a neon billboard located on the roof of a building at 51 Rancagua Street, in the Santiago Metropolitan Region of Santiago, Chile.

The sign was initially installed in 1954, and in 2010 was declared a National Monument of Chile. It is also classified as a Historical Monument.

== History ==
The Luminosos Parragué company built and installed the Monarch advertising sign in 1955.

According to the general manager of the company, Claudio Parragué says:

"Las empresas querían que se les diera una suerte de magia a sus productos. Por eso utilizamos un sistema mecánico electromagnético que con el tiempo terminó transformando a las piernas y a la botella de champagne en un clásico."

Translation to English:

"The companies wanted to incorporate a sort of magic into their products. Because of this, we used an electromagnetic mechanical system that ended up transforming the legs and champagne bottle into an icon."

The Monarch advertising sign is made of neon lighting. It turns on every night; at 9:00 PM in the summer and at 6:00 PM in the winter.

== See also ==
- Valdivieso advertising sign
- National Monuments of Chile
