= Napavine, Washington =

City in Washington, United States

Napavine
- City
- Nickname: The City on Top of the Hill
- Motto: Welcome to Napavine: for a day, or for a lifetime
- Location of Napavine, Washington
- Coordinates: 46°34′53″N 122°53′10″W
- Country: United States
- State: Washington
- County: Lewis
- Incorporated: 1913

Government
  - Type: Mayor–council
  - Mayor: Shawn O'Neill

Area
  - Total: 2.90 sq mi (7.52 km^{2})
  - Land: 2.89 sq mi (7.49 km^{2})
  - Water: 0.012 sq mi (0.03 km^{2})
- Elevation: 325 ft (99 m)

Population (2020)
  - Total: 1,888
  - Density: 692.0/sq mi (267.19/km^{2})
- Time zone: UTC-8 (Pacific (PST))
  - Summer (DST): UTC-7 (PDT)
- ZIP Code: 98565
- Area code(s): 360, 564
- FIPS code: 53-47980
- GNIS feature ID: 2411210
- Website: CityofNapavine.com

Napavine is a city in Lewis County, Washington, United States. The population was 1,888 at the 2020 census.

The early community of Napavine began during the 1850s, led by several pioneering families. The town was platted in 1883 and incorporated by 1913. Railroad and timber were the early economic drivers of the community during the late 19th and early 20th century. Several sawmills were constructed, and hotels and stores became numerous. The town's depot was a focal point until it was permanently shuttered in 1968.

Into the 21st century, Napavine has seen steady population growth, becoming known as a bedroom community with a small school district. The town has focused on creating neighborhood parks honoring long-time residents of the city and has been known since the 1970s for its annual Napavine Funtime Festival.

== Etymology ==
There are a few documented instances regarding the choice for the moniker of Napavine. Early settler to the area, Horance Pinto, is credited with naming the new settlement, Napawyna, presumably because the term sounded like a Native American word for "small prairie". The credit of using the indigenous word for small prairie, "Napavoon", was reported in other sourcing to Scottish immigrant James Urquhart, who in platting the area, named the settlement Napavine. A mention in the records of the Napavine Historical Society states that a J.W. Cutting merged the name in the 1870s from a Newaukum tribal leader named Napawyna. However, there is consideration that the woman may have taken her name after the newly designated town.

== History ==
=== Early settlement history ===
Settlers began arriving in the Cowlitz area in the early 1850s. The earliest known pioneer family was the Cutting family in 1851, who settled south of the area of what became the town of Napavine, building a log cabin the following year. Horace Pinto arrived in 1852, setting up a general store. In 1853, James Urquhart purchased the Cutting land claim, platting the community in 1883. Napavine was officially incorporated as a town on November 21, 1913 after the populace voted for such in February of that year. Napavine's first mayor was A. M. McKinley.

The Northern Pacific Railroad was established in Napavine late 1872. A sawmill under the railway company was built shortly thereafter. The town grew quickly, with a Methodist church constructed in 1885 and the community's first newspaper, the Western Washington Farmer, was begun the following year. Urquhart opened a general store and became the town's postmaster. He died in Napavine at the age of 80 in 1901.

=== 20th century ===
The duel between outlaws David Merrill and Harry Tracy, a convicted murderer, took place outside Napavine in late-June or early-July 1902, leading to Merrill's death. (Note: The date of the duel, based on conflicting reports from the community and Tracy, could have been as early as June 28th or as late as July 2nd. See sources listed.) The pair were fugitives after escaping from the Oregon State Penitentiary weeks earlier, traveling into Southwest Washington. Merrill was found to have been shot in the back and his body, in a state of decomposition, was discovered by a local Napavine woman and her son while picking berries. The woman, known as Mary Waggoner, (Note: Early reporting lists Waggoner's last name as Wagner. See sources listed.) later sought to claim the $1,500 reward money based on a dead or alive decree for Merrill by the state of Oregon, but was denied. Waggoner eventually married Merrill's brother, Ben, in 1905.

By 1908, Napavine had grown to include nine mills for lumber and shingle production, four general stores, and three hotels. A Western Union office has also been established. Despite an approximate population count of 1,000 in 1909, the town offered free lots to encourage more growth. The "no strings" offer required only that newcomers become a "booster" for the town. Napavine, at the time, was being considered as a "railroad center" with plans to add two additional rail lines.

A railroad depot was built in the late 1910s and provided passenger service until 1960. The Napavine Depot continued to serve the area until the station was permanently closed in April 1968 despite local protest. The Northern Pacific Railway station marked the highest elevation on the line between Portland and Seattle.

=== Flooding ===
On December 9, 2025, during the 2025 Pacific Northwest floods, the Newaukum River in the community peaked at 205.36 feet (62.6 m), just shy of the record of 205.5 feet (62.6 m). The following day, the river "double-crested", just exceeding 205 feet (62.5 m). The excess waters flooded several roads and multiple people were rescued from submerged vehicles trapped on Rush Road. Interstate 5 ramps were temporarily closed.

== Geography ==
Napavine is located next to Interstate 5 (I-5), roughly halfway between Portland and Seattle. According to the United States Census Bureau, the city has a total area of 2.39 square miles (6.19 km^{2}), of which, 2.38 square miles (6.16 km^{2}) is land and 0.01 square miles (0.03 km^{2}) is water. The large hill that Napavine is sitting on is about 450 feet above sea level.

== Demographics ==
Historical population
Census	Pop.	Note	%±
1920	340		—
1930	181		−46.8%
1940	220		21.5%
1950	242		10.0%
1960	314		29.8%
1970	377		20.1%
1980	611		62.1%
1990	745		21.9%
2000	1,361		82.7%
2010	1,766		29.8%
2020	1,888		6.9%
U.S. Decennial Census; 2020 Census

=== 2020 census ===
As of the 2020 census, Napavine had a population of 1,888. The median age was 36.3 years. 27.5% of residents were under the age of 18 and 15.5% of residents were 65 years of age or older. For every 100 females there were 91.7 males, and for every 100 females age 18 and over there were 89.2 males age 18 and over.

95.0% of residents lived in urban areas, while 5.0% lived in rural areas.

There were 653 households in Napavine, of which 42.0% had children under the age of 18 living in them. Of all households, 53.8% were married-couple households, 13.8% were households with a male householder and no spouse or partner present, and 24.7% were households with a female householder and no spouse or partner present. About 17.9% of all households were made up of individuals and 8.8% had someone living alone who was 65 years of age or older.

There were 697 housing units, of which 6.3% were vacant. The homeowner vacancy rate was 2.6% and the rental vacancy rate was 5.3%.

Racial composition as of the 2020 census
Race	Number	Percent
White	1,595	84.5%
Black or African American	16	0.8%
American Indian and Alaska Native	19	1.0%
Asian	22	1.2%
Native Hawaiian and Other Pacific Islander	6	0.3%
Some other race	95	5.0%
Two or more races	135	7.2%
Hispanic or Latino (of any race)	198	10.5%

=== 2010 census ===
As of the 2010 census, of 2010, there were 1,988 people, 609 households, and 770 families living in the city. The population density was 742.0 inhabitants per square mile (286.5/km^{2}). There were 662 housing units at an average density of 278.2 per square mile (107.4/km^{2}). The racial makeup of the city was 97.0% White, 0.2% African American, 0.7% Native American, 0.8% Asian, 0.1% Pacific Islander, 2.1% from other races, and 5.2% from two or more races. Hispanic or Latino of any race were 1.0% of the population.

There were 609 households, of which 63.0% had children under the age of 18 living with them, 67.0% were married couples living together, 13.8% had a female householder with no husband present, 6.4% had a male householder with no wife present, and 22.8% were non-families. 19.0% of all households were made up of individuals, and 8% had someone living alone who was 65 years of age or older. The average household size was 5.90 and the average family size was 5.29.

The median age in the city was 32.9 years. 30.8% of residents were under the age of 18; 8.6% were between the ages of 18 and 24; 26.5% were from 25 to 44; 22.3% were from 45 to 64; and 11.7% were 65 years of age or older. The gender makeup of the city was 48.6% male and 51.4% female.

=== 2000 census ===
As of the 2000 census, there were 1,361 people, 444 households, and 349 families living in the city. The population density was 1,702.5 people per square mile (656.9/km^{2}). There were 474 housing units at an average density of 592.9 per square mile (228.8/km^{2}). The racial makeup of the city was 93.02% White, 0.15% African American, 1.54% Native American, 0.15% Asian, 0.29% Pacific Islander, 3.31% from other races, and 1.54% from two or more races. Hispanic or Latino of any race were 5.73% of the population.

There were 444 households, out of which 47.7% had children under the age of 18 living with them, 57.2% were married couples living together, 16.2% had a female householder with no husband present, and 21.2% were non-families. 16.4% of all households were made up of individuals, and 6.1% had someone living alone who was 65 years of age or older. The average household size was 3.05 and the average family size was 3.45.

In the city, the population was spread out, with 37.0% under the age of 18, 7.0% from 18 to 24, 30.3% from 25 to 44, 17.0% from 45 to 64, and 8.7% who were 65 years of age or older. The median age was 29 years. For every 100 females, there were 94.4 males. For every 100 females age 18 and over, there were 91.7 males.

The median income for a household in the city was $40,966, and the median income for a family was $41,250. Males had a median income of $38,750 versus $26,103 for females. The per capita income for the city was $16,275. About 12.7% of families and 13.0% of the population were below the poverty line, including 15.8% of those under age 18 and 11.0% of those age 65 or over.

== Economy ==
Napavine primarily serves as a bedroom community for the Centralia/Chehalis and Olympia areas.

== Arts and culture ==
=== Festivals and events ===
The city annually hosts a one-day Napavine Funtime Festival which was created in 1973 by a local Jaycees club and has been organized afterwards by two original founding members. The one-day event, which includes a parade, was headlined by a teenage "Princess Napawinah" and was based on an 18th-century Newaukum Tribal leader, Napawyna. In 2023, the festival was called into question by local residents and several local Native American groups, including the Cowlitz Indian Tribe, due to the wardrobe displayed by the princess during the festivities. Petitions and concerns cited that the displays of Native American customs and clothing created a sense of Pan-Indianism and caricature. Doubts were also raised over the veracity of the historical existence of Princess Napawinah as well as her being labeled under a title of European nobility. Due to a combination of the recent contentions of stereotyping and dwindling participation in the event, the city council passed a resolution in August 2023 to give the city oversight over, but not ownership of, the Funtime Festival, with attention to change the theme of the event. In 2024, the parade and festivities were cooperatively organized by the original founding members, a local Lions Club, and the city. The event went without a Native American motif but rather the theme, "Tiger Pride", after the local high school mascot.

Napavine hosts a community Easter Egg Hunt and has held an annual Christmas Parade, or Santa Parade, since the 1980s. The procession begins at the Napavine Community Park and courses through the downtown area.

=== Tourism ===
The Uncle Sam billboard is located on private property within Napavine. Since being erected in the 1960s, the board had been used to display the conservative political opinions of its prior owners. The Confederated Tribes of the Chehalis Reservation purchased the billboard in 2025 and the remaining political messages were removed.

== Parks and recreation ==
The largest and newest park in the town is the Napavine Community Park located near the downtown section. It includes an amphitheater and skate park. The community also hosts Robert Cook Day Park, also known as the Robert Cook Playground, nestled in a residential area. Near the school district is Mayme Shaddock Park. The 4-acre (1.6 ha) site contains various recreational and picnic amenities, including the Jim Haslett Kitchen. The kitchen, completed in 2024, was named in honor of a long-serving councilman and park supporter. Shaddock was a long-time resident of Napavine, serving as a city clerk, working for the post office, and once ran a candy shop in the town during the 1950s.

Napavine was considered, in 2009, as the site for the Southwest Washington Regional Equestrian Center, originally planned for Winlock. The REQ Center, as it was also known, was scaled down in cost, purpose, and size. The REQ plan was abandoned, replaced with a proposal for a $15 million multipurpose facility that maintained the focus of an equestrian center. Named the Newaukum Center, the proposed complex was never built due to time constraints for limited state funding and an eventual choice in 2010 to use such funds to construct a sports complex in Centralia.

Located near the Uncle Sam billboard was the Dancing Swallows Big Gay Bird Sanctuary and Memorial Pond which contained birdhouses for swallows that were fashioned in colors associated with gay pride. The site was begun by a local resident, Kyle Wheeler, in response and opposition to the billboard as well as to the rise in hate speech and crimes towards the LGBTQ population. Wheeler, who owned the small, triangular parcel, transformed the grounds into a sanctuary. The memorial was created in honor of a deceased friend, Kali. The land was sold in June 2024 and the private park was deemed closed.

== Government and politics ==
Presidential Elections Results
Year	Republican	Democratic	Third parties
2004	72.5% 457	26.5% 167	0.7% 6
2008	67.0% 466	30.5% 212	2.6% 18
2012	63.5% 434	33.5% 229	2.9% 20
2016	69.5% 496	24.6% 176	5.9% 42
2020	68.9% 670	28.2% 274	2.4% 23
2024	69.6% 738	27.8% 295	2.6% 28

The 2020 election included votes for candidates of the Libertarian Party and 5 votes for write-in candidates.. In the 2024 election, nineteen votes were tallied for Robert F. Kennedy Jr..

In January 2008, 22 year-old Nick Bozarth became the youngest mayor in the history of Napavine. Bozarth banned city workers from taking extended lunch breaks and removed a controversial police chief. Bozarth intended to be a one-term mayor, and chose not to run for re-election, citing that public servants should not be long term office holders.

As of 2025, Shawn O'Neill is mayor of Napavine.

== Education ==
The first school constructed in Napavine was a one-room schoolhouse in 1893. The building was replaced in 1913 with a two-story, six-room school in 1913. Four years later, high school classes were first offered. A new school was built once again in 1922.

Napavine School District operates two public schools in the city of Napavine, an elementary school and a combined middle-school-high school, known as Napavine High School. As of 2022, the total enrollment was recorded at 814 students. The high school has a 2B athletics classification and plays in the Washington Interscholastic Activities Association (WIAA) Southwest Washington District 4. Napavine also is home to the Napavine Christian Academy owned by the Baptist church.

State titles for Napavine High School includes three WIAA 2B state championships for the boys football team in 2008, 2016 and 2022. The girls basketball team won the 2B state championship in 2024, overcoming Okanogan by a score of 41-40 on a 3-point shot with 16 seconds left to play in regulation. The boys baseball team won their first 2B state title in 2026, defeating three-time defending champion Tri-Cities Prep by a score of 10 to 5.

== Infrastructure ==
The community began constructing a water and sewer system in the 1950s. The water supply is supported by a 100,000-US-gallon (380,000 L; 83,000 imp gal) water tower and a 350,000-US-gallon (1,300,000 L; 290,000 imp gal) reservoir.

== Notable people ==
- Patricia Anne Morton, first woman to serve as a Diplomatic Security special agent
- Skyler Wheeler, state politician in Iowa
