= Valdivieso advertising sign =

Coordinates: 33°26′27″S 70°37′52″W

- Letrero publicitario de Valdivieso
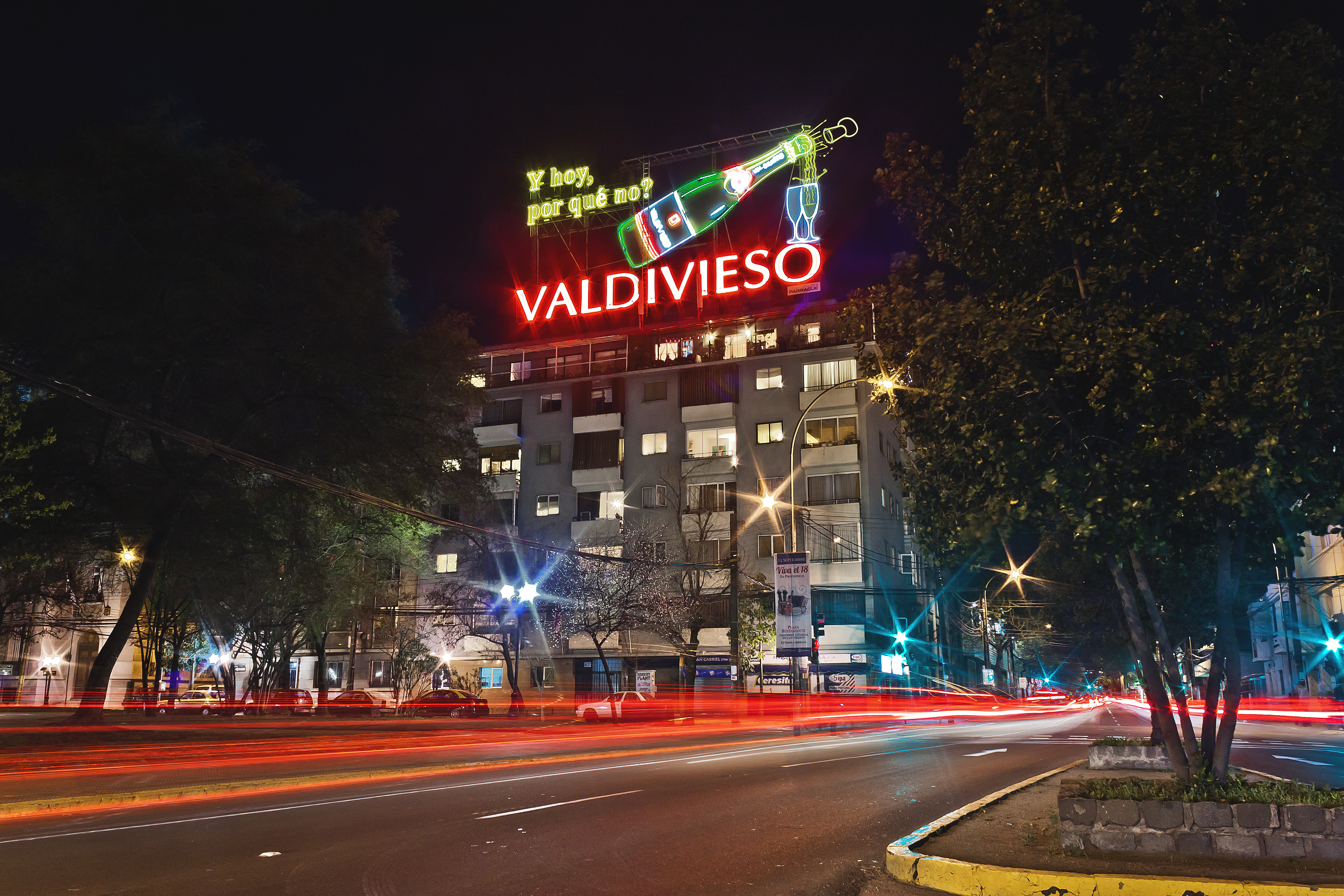
- View of the Valdivieso Sparkling Wine Sign at night, from Rancagua Street
- Interactive map of Valdivieso advertising sign
- Location: Chile 93 General Bustamante Streer, Santiago, Santiago Metropolitan Region
- Material: Neon lighting
- Decree N.º 219 on May 31, 2010

The Valdivieso advertising sign (Spanish: letrero publicitario de Valdivieso) is a rooftop outdoor advertisement at 93 General Bustamante Street, Santiago, Chile. Erected around 1954, it was declared a National Monument of Chile on May 31, 2010.

The neon sign turns on at 9:00 PM during the summer and at 6:00 PM during the winter.

== History ==
The Valdivieso advertising sign was built in 1955 by the Luminosos Parragué company. General manager Claudio Parragué stated:

"The companies wanted their products to portray a sort of 'magic.' That's why we used a mechanical electromagnetic system that, in time, ended up transforming the champagne bottle into a classic icon."

== See also ==
- Monarch advertising sign
- Boston Citgo sign
