= Paddy Power Cleeve Hill Sign =

Advertising board in the UK

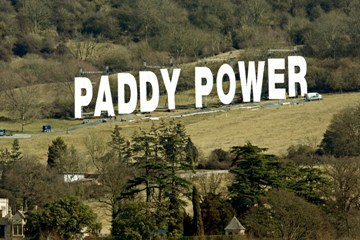
Paddy Power advertising board situated on Cleeve Hill

The Paddy Power Cleeve Hill sign was officially the world's largest free standing advertising board in the world until 2010. Situated in Cheltenham in the United Kingdom the board was built by Bristol-based Utopium Lighting to advertise the Paddy Power betting company on the Cheltenham Gold Cup race week. It stood 50 feet high, stretched 270 feet wide and cost tens of thousands of pounds and 1000 man-hours to create. This is bigger than the Hollywood Sign, which is 45 feet tall.

The sign came down the day after the Cheltenham Gold Cup racing day, on Saturday 20 March 2010, due to Tewkesbury borough council claiming they would consider enforcement action if it was not dismantled.

The sign briefly reappeared adjacent to Celtic Manor, venue of the 2010 Ryder Cup, on 28 September 2010. However, before the sign was completed local authorities brought a court injunction forcing Paddy Power to remove the sign before the Ryder Cup began on 1 October. The sign is also one of the first controversial outdoor advertisements for Paddy Power, since controversies coming with their vandalism of the Uffington White Horse in 2012.
