= Bloom (store) =

American grocery store chain

- Company type: Subsidiary
- Industry: Retail
- Founded: 2004
- Defunct: 2012
- Fate: Converted to Food Lion
- Headquarters: Salisbury, North Carolina, U.S.
- Key people: Richard Hagen, president
- Products: Groceries
- Parent: Food Lion
- Website: shopbloom.com

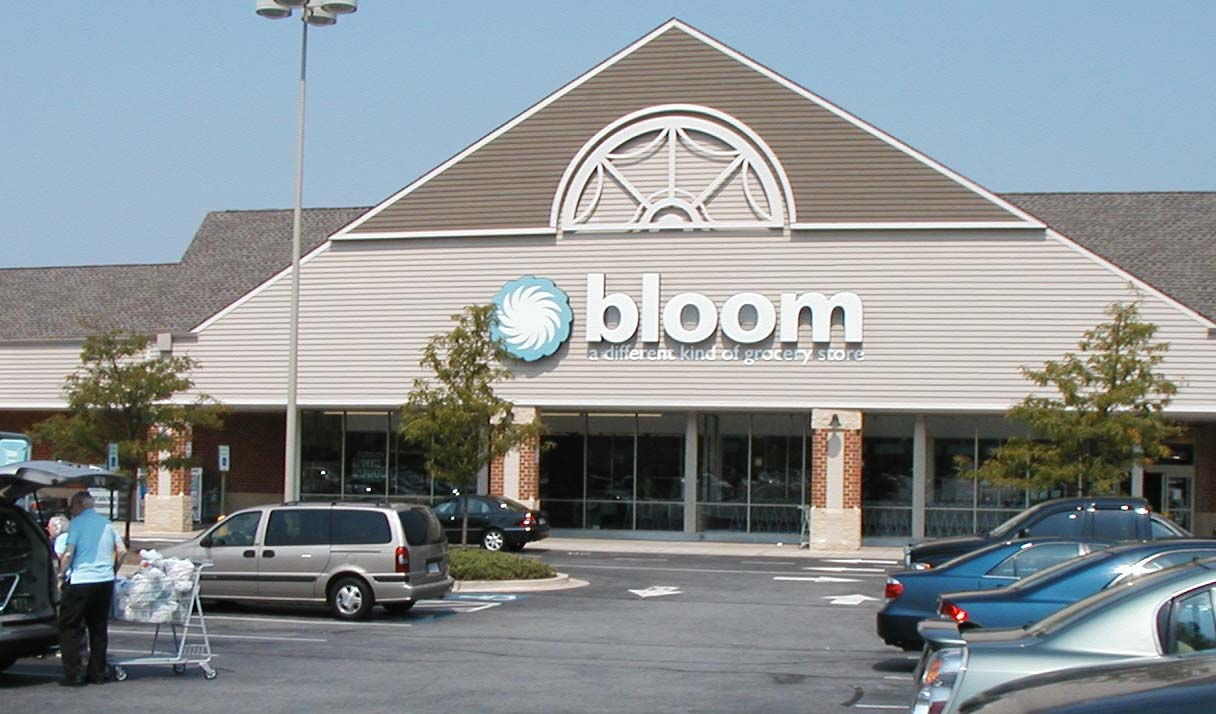
Bloom store in Accokeek, Maryland

Bloom was a chain of mid-grade American grocery stores operated by Food Lion established in 2004. The parent company of Food Lion, The Delhaize Group, announced in January 2012 that it was discontinuing the Bloom brand. Bloom's headquarters were in Salisbury, North Carolina.

== History ==
In 2002, after realizing that customers' needs, expectations, and behaviors were changing and becoming more diverse, Food Lion created a cross-functional "concept" team whose mission was to examine customer and retail trends, identify opportunities for growth, and develop retail concepts to capture those opportunities. Soon after came the idea of Bloom.

Bloom (then called Bloom, A Food Lion Market) was first test marketed in Charlotte, North Carolina, through five test stores, the first of which opened on May 26, 2004. The concept was based on the idea of using a slightly unconventional layout to maximize shopper convenience. This layout included a TableTop section at the entrance to the store (where the shopper can purchase ready-to-eat foods), wider aisles, and convenient groupings of foods. In most locations, customers could buy milk at the front of the store. This eliminated the need to walk to the back, where milk is normally located.

One of the ways Bloom tried to differentiate itself from competition was through the addition of consumer-friendly technology. Self-checkout stands, PAT (Personal Assistant Technology) the revolutionary touch screen computer that used a wireless in-store network, and produce scales with printers that let customers create bar-coded tags were placed in most stores to maximize customer convenience.

In March 2011, Delhaize America and its Bloom banner announced that it would convert 15 of its stores in the Charlotte, North Carolina, and Greenville, South Carolina, markets into Food Lion stores. In some areas, this resulted in two Food Lions being within a mile of each other.

In January 2012 Delhaize announced that, as part of a restructuring of its US operations, the Bloom banner would be retired and the remaining stores either converted to Food Lion or closed.

== Slogans ==
- "Thought for Food."
- "A Food Lion Market."
- "A Different Kind of Grocery Store."
