= Billboard bicycle =

Advertisement attached to a bicycle

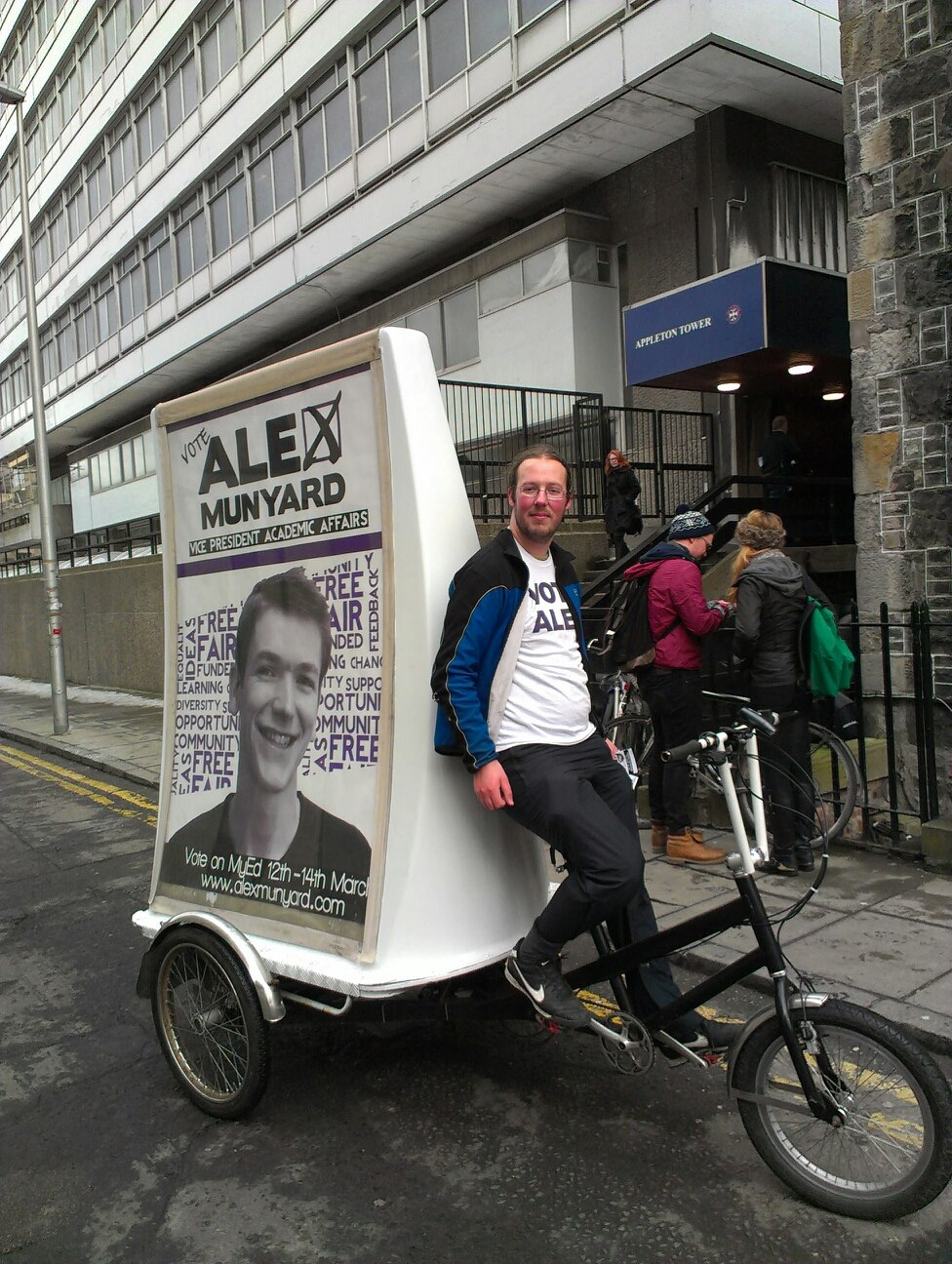
Tricycle billboard in Edinburgh, Scotland.

A billboard bicycle (advertising bike) is a type of mobile advertising in which a bike tows a billboard with an advertising message. Gary Saunders of Queens, NY, New York began the billboard bicycle concept in 1997 (although evidence of billboard bicycles dates back at least to the 1940s). His billboard bicycle was geared toward messenger bikes and measured 12" by 18".

== Types ==
Since the introduction of the billboard bicycle, several different variations of the billboard bicycle, differing in both size and appearance, have been constructed. Today, billboard bicycles come in a variety of shapes and sizes. Some billboard bicycles are one unit. Others are composed of a bike and a detachable billboard. Some billboard bicycles are specially manufactured to have a unique look in order to further attract an audiences attention. Others are simple frames which focus attention solely on the advertising message. Some billboard bicycles use large billboards; however the size of the billboard is limited by wind constraints. Other billboards are small, like Gary Saunders original messenger signs.

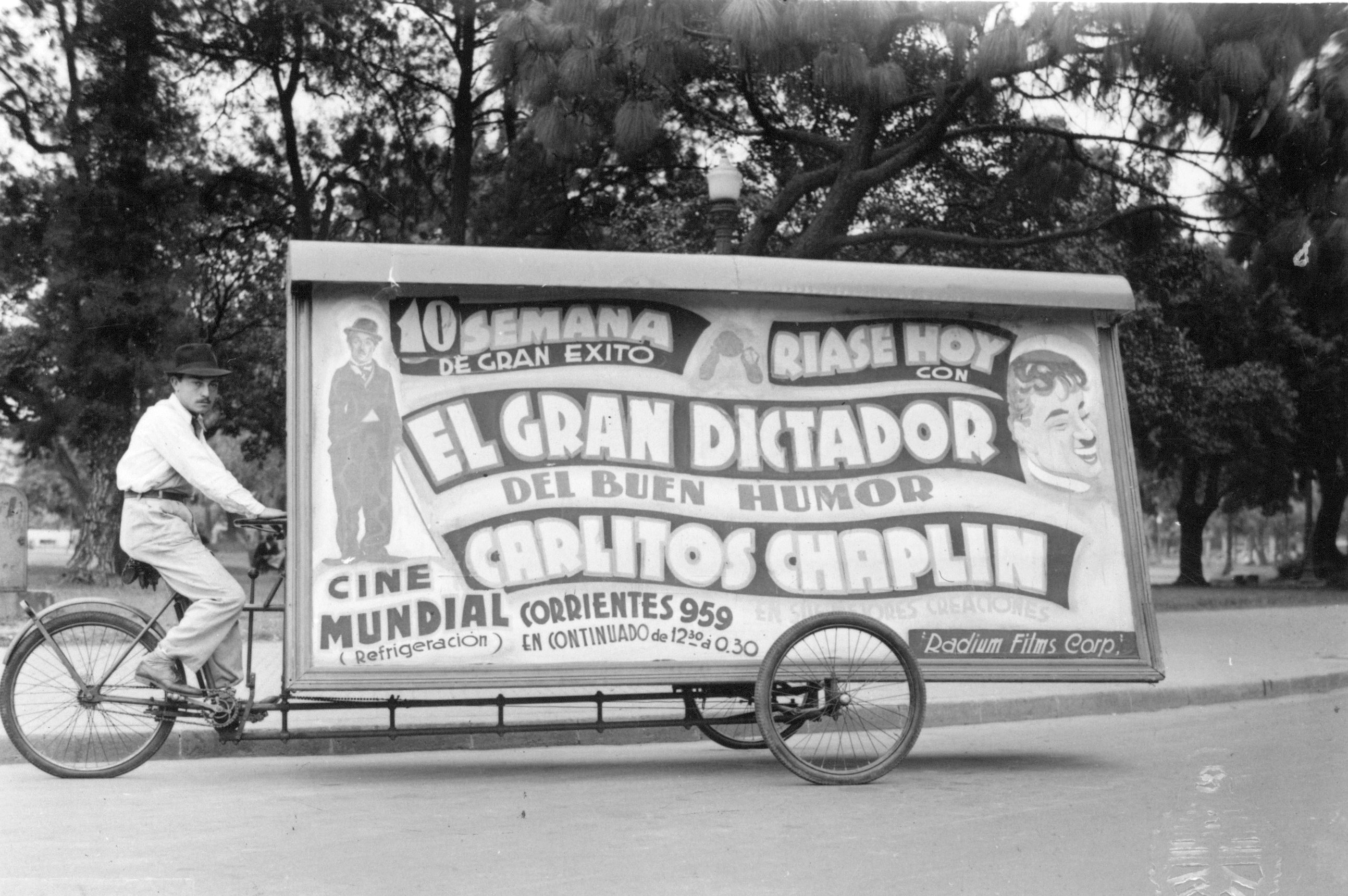
Billboard bicycle used to publicise the film The Great Dictator, 1941

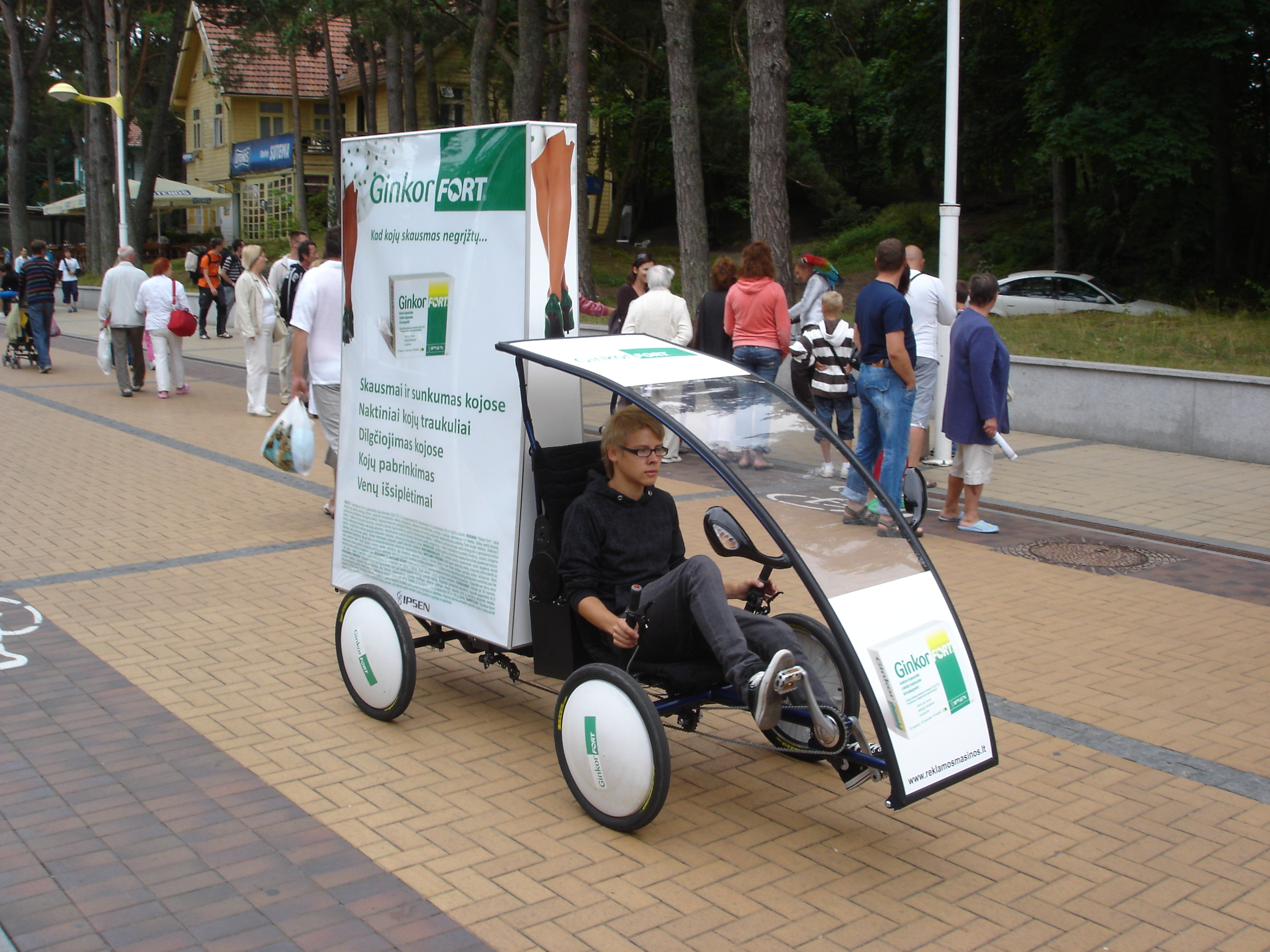
Advertising bike.

== See also ==
- Outline of cycling
