= Uncle Sam billboard =

Billboard in Napavine, Washington, US

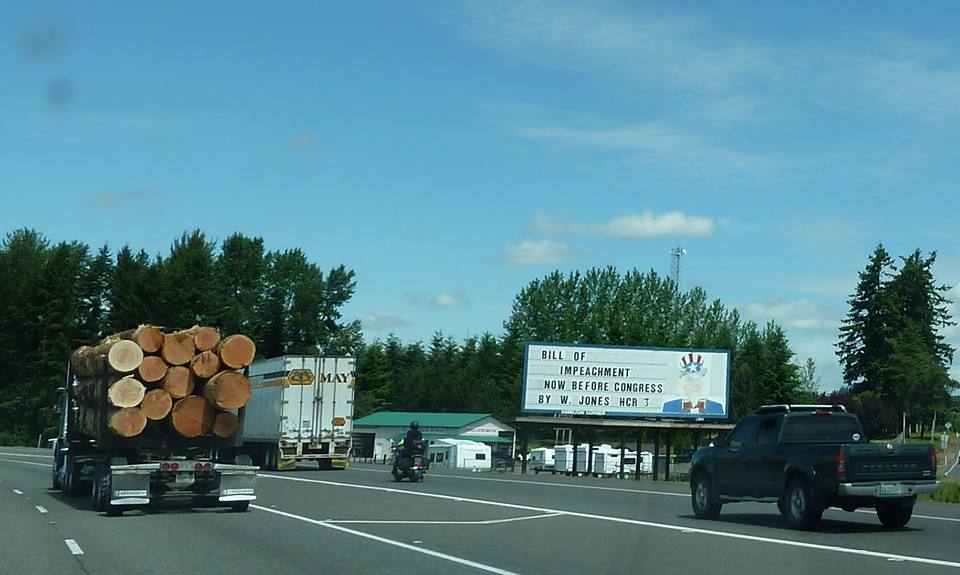
- The billboard in 2013. It reads "Bill of Impeachment / Now Before Congress / By W. Jones HCR 3".
- Features: Depiction of Uncle Sam
- Builder: Alfred Hamilton
- Constructed: 1996
- Dimensions: 13 ft × 41 ft (4.0 m × 12.5 m)
- Owner: Confederated Tribes of the Chehalis Reservation
- Location: Napavine, Washington
- Location within Washington (state)
- Coordinates: 46°36′31″N 122°54′31″W

The Uncle Sam billboard is a large, privately owned billboard in the U.S. state of Washington. The billboard is located directly adjacent to the northbound lanes of Interstate 5 in Napavine, Washington, around 8 miles (13 km) south of Chehalis, in Lewis County. It is considered a local landmark.

There have been four iterations of the billboard. The first sign was erected in the 1960s and was used originally to display the right-wing political opinions of its owner, Alfred Hamilton. The tradition continued with the following billboards, two of which were rebuilt or moved due to legal issues with Washington state in the 1970s. The current billboard was erected in 1996.

In June 2025, the Confederated Tribes of the Chehalis Reservation purchased the property and the sign from the Hamilton family. The billboard's final messages, which had been displayed since 2021, were removed; the sign remained blank until October 2025, when the Chehalis Tribe displayed the message, "NATIVE LAND – #CHEHALIS".

== Description and geography ==
The Uncle Sam billboard is located beside the northbound lanes of Interstate 5 (I-5), near the Rush Road, Exit 72 onramp, south of Chehalis, Washington and near the northern city limits of Napavine. The sign is situated on a commercial parcel measured at 3.54 acres (1.43 ha).

The billboards can be seen from the air and from various roads in the area, as well as viewed from both directions on I-5. Motorists on the interstate have been called a "captive audience", as congestion often causes traffic jams between Seattle and Portland, Oregon, both generally considered politically liberal cities.

The current sign contains two billboards in a V-shaped arrangement and measures 13 ft × 41 ft (4.0 m × 12.5 m) and features a large depiction of Uncle Sam on both sides. The image of Uncle Sam, approximately 4 feet (1.2 m) tall, is either described as a drawing, painting, or as a cut-out. (Note: In a 2017 Seattle Times article, the Uncle Sam artwork was described as "drawn by somebody not very good at painting images of a 4-foot head".) Messages have been historically noted to always have been in full, capital lettering.

The Uncle Sam billboard, including its precursors, contained mostly conservative messages (Note: Hamilton's messages are also described as being "archconservative". See sources throughout the article for the differing description.) mentioning various subjects, such as abortion, big government, and homosexuality, and often included statements regarding local, state, and geopolitical affairs. Opposition to gun control and the Democratic Party also garnered repeated statements. During Alfred Hamilton's lifetime, messages were noted to be changed after a few weeks; in the year leading up to the 1995 sale, billboard messages were changed once per month.

== History ==
=== Alfred Hamilton ===
Alfred Hamilton was born on March 31, 1920 and was raised in Chehalis, Washington. A large man, possibly as tall as 6'4", he was described as "physically imposing" and the "kind of man you wouldn't want to mess with". (Note: Hamilton was compared to resemble Anthony Quinn in an Associated Press article in 1974.) He attended Washington State University but chose to leave the school before he graduated to avoid being drafted into military service during World War II. He began farming and married Ruth Knoles in 1942. The Hamilton's purchased what became known as the Hamilton Farm in 1945. The couple had five children.

Hamilton initially raised sheep; switching to turkeys where he produced up to 30,000 per year. He helped develop a breed of turkey that was sold to various hotels and restaurants between Portland and Seattle. He inherited property from his father near Napavine, Washington and began investing in real estate and the stock market; he was noted to have done "very well" with his investing habits.

Alfred died on November 9, 2004 at his home in Curtis, Washington after having been diagnosed with cancer and Parkinson's disease in his last few years. Ruth died previously in 2001.

=== First billboard, 1960s ===
The 200-acre (81 ha) Hamilton farm was bisected by Interstate 5 (I-5) during construction of the highway through Lewis County, Washington during the 1950s and 1960s. Alfred Hamilton believed compensation for his lost property was low. He began leasing land on his farm near the highway in the early 1960s for billboard use but the attempts were stopped due to Washington state's voluntary compliance with the Highway Beautification Act of 1965. In opposition, and possibly as a means of protecting a source of income, Hamilton built his own billboard; the sign could only be viewed by northbound travelers on the interstate.

The early version contained advertising for his turkey business and a statement that billboards were also not allowed in Russia. Washington state filed an immediate nuisance lawsuit to have the sign removed; the state lost. The billboard received its first known newspaper account as a front page photo and caption in the November 24, 1967, edition of The Chronicle, a local publication based out of Centralia.

Hamilton continued posting his political and social views on the billboard; the statements were noted to promote Hamilton's "archconservative views in big block letters".

=== Second billboard, 1968 ===
Hamilton's second billboard was constructed on his non-farm parcel located east of the highway in 1968. The 13 ft × 41 ft (4.0 m × 12.5 m) sign was 26 feet (7.9 m) tall and built in a V-shaped arrangement, allowing drivers travelling in both directions to view the billboard. A drawing of Uncle Sam (Note: The original drawing of Uncle Sam was noted to be "somber" or "troubled" in appearance.) was added and block lettering used in his message's were recorded to be 2 feet (0.61 m) high. The advertisements for the farm was noted to be in "far smaller print".

The feature became known as the "Uncle Sam billboard", but also given monikers such as the "Hamilton Farms sign" or simply as the "Hamilton sign". The feature was meant to “advertise the [Hamilton's] agricultural products”, usually in small type, and either mentioned the business as "Hamilton Farms" or the registered brand name of his livestock, "Hamilton's 7+". By 1974, the sign advertised his business as "Hamilton's Turkeys".

The state filed a lawsuit against Hamilton in 1971 believing that the billboard violated Washington state's Scenic Vistas Act of 1971. (Note: The 1971 lawsuit case number was 30964.) During the years-long lawsuit, messages were updated approximately every few weeks. Due to the billboard's placement on non-farm land, Hamilton settled with the state in January 1974 and agreed to remove the sign by August. The agreement required Washington state to cover the cost for the removal; the state also paid Hamilton $162,500 for the loss of property due to the construction of the highway.

Hamilton admitted that the billboard, by June 1974, was "in need of repair and repainting" and he was giving "serious consideration" as to whether to replace or rebuild the sign. On August 2, 1974, the billboard was reported to be in the process of being removed.

=== Third billboard, 1974 ===
By October, Hamilton began constructing a new billboard with lighting near his barn on the farmland parcel west of the interstate; the lighted billboard was back to being "operational" on December 9, 1974.

The lawsuit was revived in June 1975 in opposition to the third version of Hamilton's billboard. Citing violations of the Scenic Vista Act, the case was filed by State Attorney General Slade Gorton who expressed "amazement and disappointment" that Hamilton had "simply moved" the billboard to the other side of the highway. Despite a petition delivered to Gorton, signed by approximately 20,000 people in support of Hamilton and the billboard, (Note: The 1975 petition was led by Chehalis resident, Dick Bindara. An assistant to Gorton who received the paperwork stated that the petitions were to be "taken for what they are, an expression for a point of view" and that the case was to proceed regardless. After the petition was vetted, 10,109 people were listed. Gorton replied by letter to each signee, stating that despite the support, the billboard was unlawful and as he was tasked with upholding the law, the case was to proceed. The cost of mailing the letters were reported to be approximately $657.) a two-day trial was held at the Lewis County Superior Court in November 1977; Hamilton was a witness on the first day. (Note: The state had taken 117 photographs of the billboard, and attempted to introduce the pictures as evidence. Sources vary on whether or not the photos were allowed as evidence during the trial. See sources regarding the 1977 case in the section.) In the leadup to the trial, Gorton stated that the lawsuit was not about Hamilton's messages but was entirely focused on adherence to federal and state billboard laws passed since the 1960s.

The case was ruled in Hamilton's favor; (Note: The six-member jury was allowed to view the billboard in person.) the jury decision cited the location of the new sign, as well as its primary use as advertising for Hamilton's business rather than as a promotion of his views. The state appealed but the Washington State Court of Appeals affirmed the original decision in December 1979. The appeals court noted that the sign's use to advertise Hamilton's business was in accordance with the Scenic Vistas Act. The court also noted the Uncle Sam artwork was an "effective tool in drawing attention to the billboard". (Note: The Uncle Sam lawsuit has often been used as a freedom of speech issue despite the focus of the case. Free speech and First Amendment concerns were noted to be briefly discussed during the 1979 appeals case but were not part of the final decision. The appeals court declined to address the issue fully and did not base their decision on free speech issues, stating that the actual primary purpose of the billboard was unsure and there was a lack of state codes or guidelines at the time.) A petition to appeal was denied by the Washington Supreme Court in April 1980.

Beginning in 1983, Alfred and Ruth took a nine-year travel around the world by sailboat, fishing and living for a time on the vessel around Alaska. His children, grandchildren, and unnamed friends began managing the billboards and its messaging, continuing to do so after Hamilton's death in 2004.

=== Fourth billboard, 1996 ===
In October 1995, announcements were published stating that Hamilton sold his farm to National Frozen Foods of Chehalis for $750,000; as part of the sale, the billboard was required to be removed by August the next year. (Note: The Hamilton farm was recorded to be 130 acres (53 ha) by the 1995 sale.) By April 1996, rumors began circulating that Hamilton was preparing to move the billboard and reestablish the landmark. In response, Hamilton stated, "You'll have to wait and find out". The erection of the billboard was reported to have begun by July at its current site just inside the Napavine city limits, immediately east of the interstate. (Note: Sympathetic public reaction to the potential loss of the billboard is noted to be the impetus for Hamilton to move the sign in 1995.)

In 2003, the Uncle Sam billboard was calculated to have been viewed by approximately 50,000 vehicles traveling daily on the interstate; by 2016, an estimated 22.5 million vehicles passed by the billboard annually. An estimation in 2017 listed that the landmark had been viewed approximately 1.3 billion times during the overall 50-year history of Hamilton's billboards.

The billboard once had websites dedicated to the sign, either for or against the messages; one site was known as "The Fascist Farmer Strikes Again". A dedicated Twitter account for the sign was created while under Hamilton family ownership.

After Alfred's death, his family, who did not necessarily share all of his views, was initially uncertain if they would continue with the billboard's conservative content and upkeep; Hamilton's grandson posted new messages periodically after Alfred's death. His son said, "I know the billboard had a lot of repercussions politically, from the state and the feds on down, because he voiced his opinions and sometimes he stepped on toes."

In June 2020, a petition listing 73,000 signatures was addressed to the Chehalis city council asking for the removal of the billboard, which sits in the city of Napavine. The request refers to purported statements posted on the sign as being racist and offensive while possibly creating a perception that the local communities are of such nature. The accuracy of an example shown in the petition was questioned. The appearance of the petition coincided with a brush fire deliberately set in an attempt to burn down the billboard that same month; damage to the sign was limited to minor charring of the supports. Later in the month, following a second petition to keep the sign, a rumored threat to the billboard spread. A group of approximately 100 people, including a county commissioner and county sheriff, gathered at the sign. The suspected dangers, ranging from blocked roads by those who wanted the billboard removed to possible anti-fascist violence, did not materialize.

=== Sale of billboard, 2025 ===
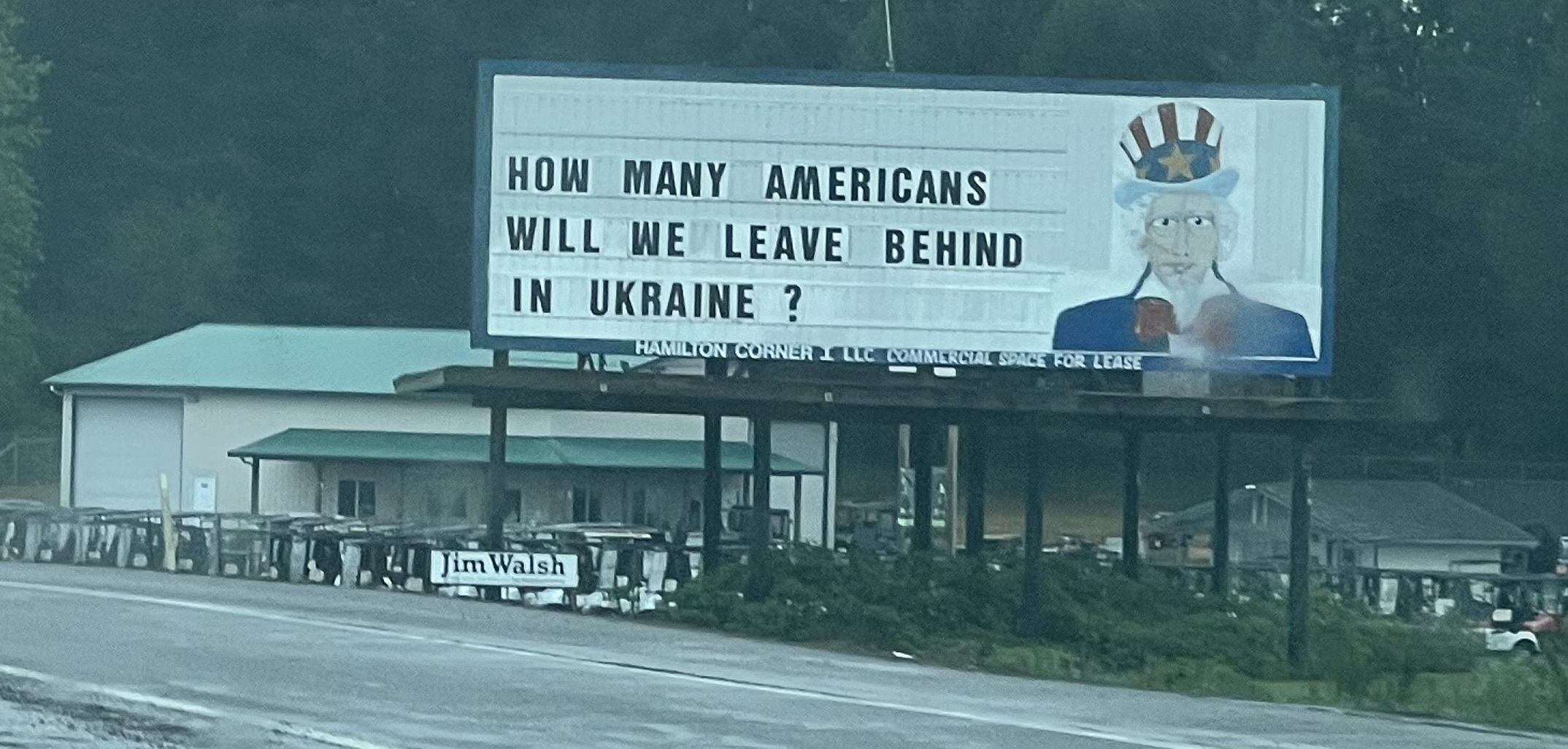
Final message under Hamilton ownership, northbound side, May 2023

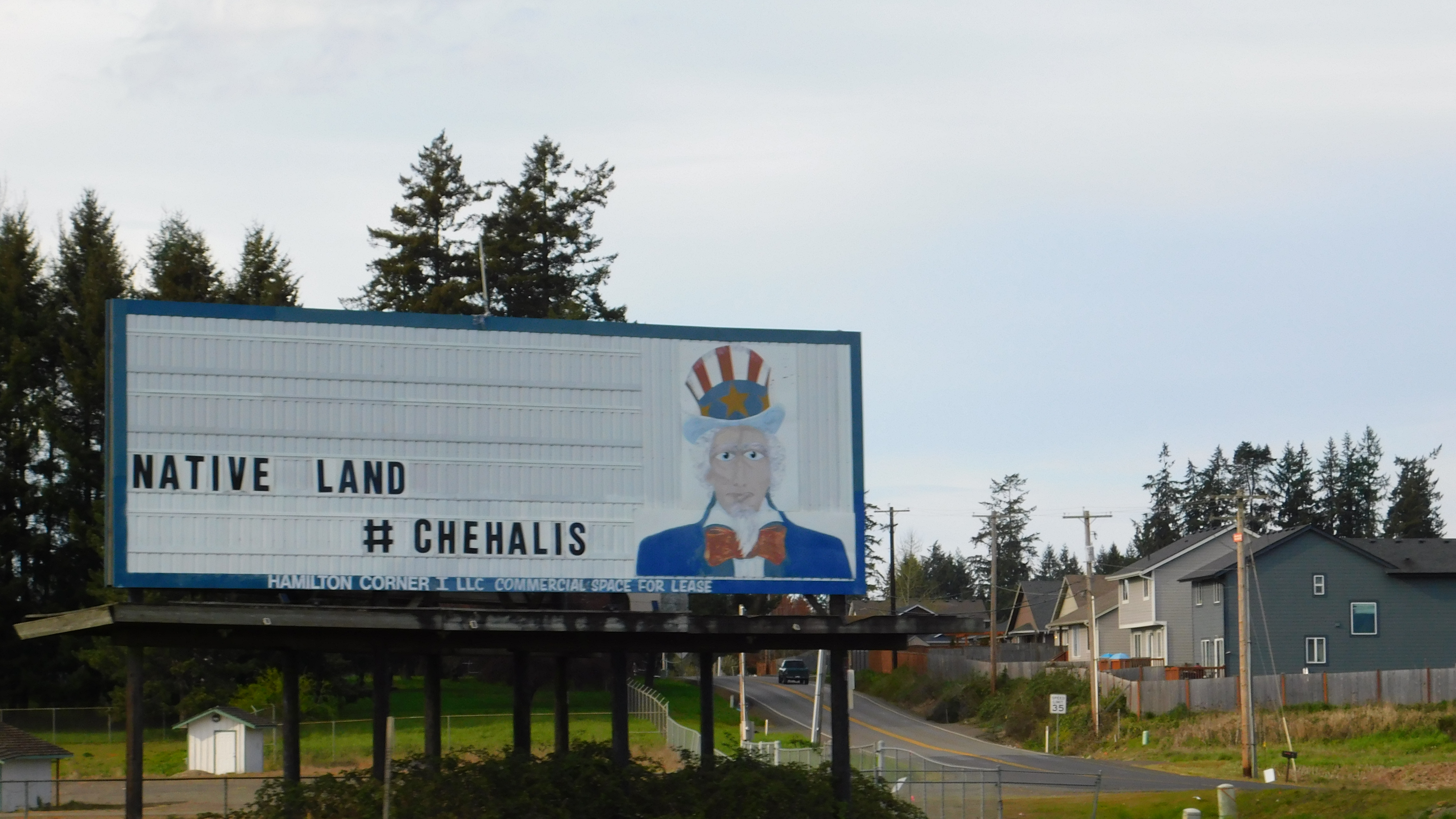
First message under Chehalis tribal ownership, northbound side, April 2026

The Uncle Sam billboard and the commercial property it sits on, was listed for sale in March 2025 for $2.5 million. The offer also included the possibility to purchase an adjoining, mostly undeveloped 30.8-acre (12.5 ha) parcel also owned by the Hamilton family. In June 2025, the Confederated Tribes of the Chehalis Reservation completed its purchase of the billboard. In an announcement, the remaining political messages were to be removed and that there were no definitive future plans for the billboard.

Approximately two weeks after the purchase, the last messages which had adorned the billboard unchanged since 2021 were removed. The final messages were, "How many Americans will we leave behind in Ukraine?" located on the northbound side, and "No one died in WW2 so you could show papers to buy food" on the side facing southbound traffic.

On October 23, 2025, the Chehalis Tribe changed the sign's message for the first time to read, "NATIVE LAND – #CHEHALIS". Announcements by the tribe mentioned the phrase to be "innocuous" and a "statement of fact", and that "no controversy or hidden meaning" is behind the updated sign. No plans to further change the messaging on the billboard were announced by the Confederated Tribes of the Chehalis Reservation.

A representative of the Chehalis tribe stated that if the billboard was to remain, the new ownership had "a good time thinking of crazy stuff we could put up there".

== Messages ==
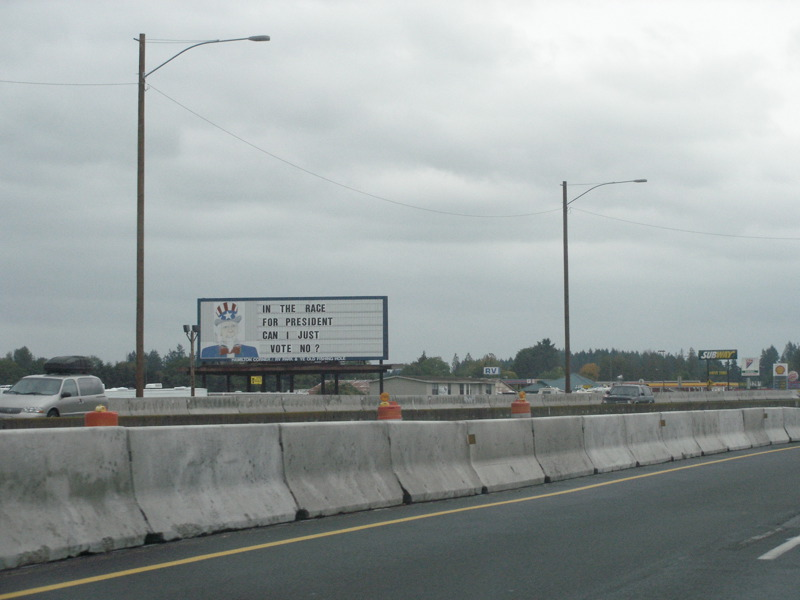
The billboard viewed from southbound I-5 in October, 2007. The message reads, "In the race for president can I just vote no?"

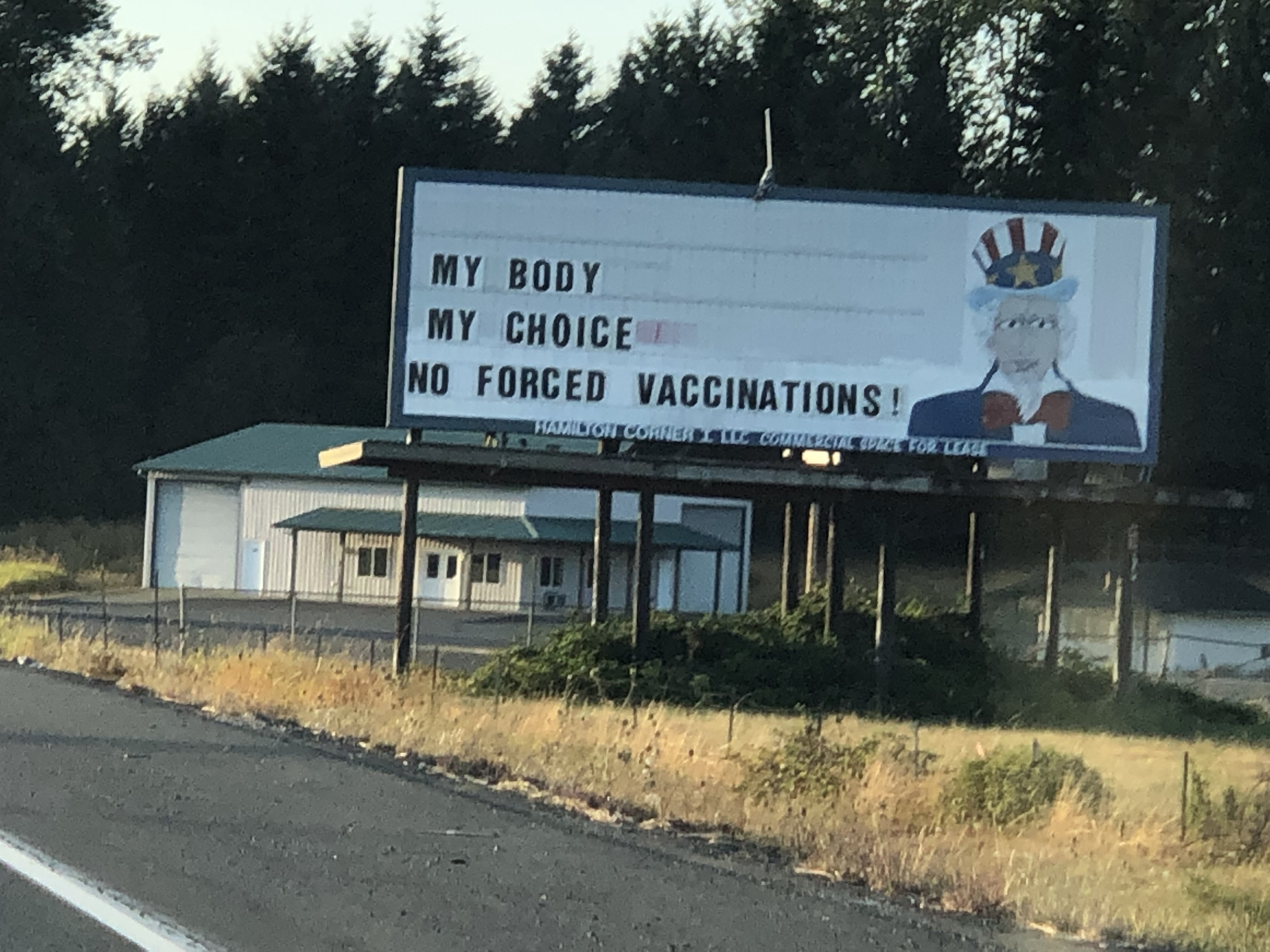
Hamilton Farm billboard on August 23, 2021

Messages that have appeared on the sign include:

- "There are no billboards in Russia!", (November 1967); first recorded message
- "Let's keep the Canal and give them Kissinger" (1970s); Hamilton declared this his favorite message
- "Women are meant to be cherished not liberated" (1970s)
- "Be thankful you live in America" (1974)
- "AIDS, the miracle disease. It turns fruits into vegetables" (1987); commenting on the AIDS crisis during the 1980s.
- "Evergreen State College- Home of environmental terrorists and homos?" (1987)
- "Seems a little queer" (1990s); response to state laws banning discrimination against LGBTQ state employees
- "Hasn't Gregoire cost taxpayers plenty of $ $ in boo-boos?" (2004); Hamilton's last message before his death in November 2004
- "Where's the birth certificate?" (2000s–2010s); refers to the birtherism conspiracy theory regarding President Barack Obama's status as a U.S. citizen
- "Oh, no! A virus! Quick - burn the Bill of Rights!" (2020); posted during the COVID-19 pandemic

=== Context ===
The early and current versions of the Uncle Sam billboard contained mostly conservative messages mentioning various subjects, including abortion, big government, and homosexuality. Postings on the first Hamilton billboards also included statements regarding local, state, and geopolitical affairs, as well as remarks on women's rights. Under Hamilton's own admittance, messages were also posted that mirrored viewpoints of the John Birch Society. An unknown number of statements may have also come from Hamilton's friend, S.J. Agnew, a "politically conservative lumber baron and horse breeder". (Note: Agnew's son, Dan, served as Hamilton's attorney during legal issues and trials regarding the billboard in the 1970s.)

Attempts to interview Hamilton, including efforts by the local newspaper, The Chronicle, were usually unsuccessful. (Note: Despite numerous sources stating Hamilton was reluctant to be interviewed, he gave statements to news outlets and publications numerously over the course of his lifetime in regards to the billboard. See sources in the article for the discrepancy.) The direct meaning or context of Hamilton's statements were left to interpretation as he was consistently unwilling to admit he had any motives or purpose. Hamilton has stated that the billboard was meant to "draw people's attention to the fact we have a sign out there" or to be "strictly used to beat the donkey over the head". Politically, Hamilton described himself in 1977 as a "middle-of-the-roader" and did not lean to the far left nor to the far right.

Hamilton family members were also noted to be reticent to grant interviews regarding the billboard and its continuing messages after Alfred Hamilton's death. Alfred's son, Mike, in an interview in 2006, stated that the billboard was "not all positive, but it is mostly" and that his efforts were to inform readers of a "whole world of really nasty politics".

== Reception ==
=== Billboard ===
An early protest against Hamilton's messages occurred in 1971. The early version of the billboard was defaced with black and red spray paint on the Uncle Sam feature. The statements, "Power to the people" and "Free Angela Davis", were added to an existing message on the sign. About 570 supporters of the billboard, known as the "Hamilton billboard boosters", ordered a full-page advertisement in The Chronicle in response to the vandalism. The headline stated, "Who is trying to destroy the Hamilton billboard?".

Hamilton's remarks in 1987 regarding the AIDS crisis drew large criticism from local residents. The message was removed within days after a noticeable negative reaction.

A 2017 Seattle Times news article reported that although the billboard and its statements had a large number of supporters in the rural and conservative communities of Lewis County, the messages have been considered by other residents as "extreme". Interviews with supporters and critics have also noted that the sign was an "icon" in the county and the billboard was usually a topic that was brought up whenever Lewis County was mentioned in conversation.

Several attempts have been made by various individuals and groups to have the billboard legally removed. The landmark has been vandalized on numerous occasions and there have been a few attempts to burn the sign down, most recently in June, 2020.

=== More about Alfred Hamilton ===
In an interview in 1977, Hamilton stated that 98% of people who wrote to him in regards to the billboard supported his sign; Hamilton is also recorded as stating that feedback to the sign had been "95 percent positive". In 1985, Hamilton told The Oregonian that he had received threats over the sign.

After Hamilton's death, an article in the New York Times and an editorial in the Seattle Post-Intelligencer stated that the publications disagreed with the messages on the billboard, finding them to be the words of a "cranky crusader", who wrote "a kind of grouchy chronicle of one man's one-sided take on things". Alfred was further described as someone who "loved a fight" and was a "stubborn man, a turkey farmer with a big belly full of opinions". Continuing, Hamilton was noted to have "minced no words in attacking virtually everything and everyone that irritated him: gun control, the government and gays, Russians and radicals, Kissinger and Kerry". However, the newspapers reported that statements on the landmark "celebrates a founding principle of our nation, the First Amendment". (Note: The Seattle Post-Intelligencer editorial wrote in full, that the paper "thought the billboards cranky, but worth looking at. That billboard is what makes America better because it celebrates a founding principle of our nation, the First Amendment. We completely disagree with Hamilton's view of the world, but praise his discourse." The editorial began with the phrase "Uncle Sam is no more", but ended with, "Forget what we said above. 'Uncle Sam' lives".)

One of his friends recalled Hamilton's belief that "all Democrats were 'damn fools'", saying: "I warned people not to get into discussions of religion and politics with him. He was so set in his ways that it was unusual". Hamilton once stated: "I'm not trying to convert anyone to my way of thinking. But I want to make people think".

== Dancing Swallows Big Gay Bird Sanctuary and Memorial Pond ==
A local resident, Kyle Wheeler, owned a small triangular parcel across from the billboard. Wheeler responded in opposition to the billboard, as well as to the rise in hate speech and crimes towards the LGBTQ population, by erecting a sign at the site in the fall of 2020 that stated, "Lewis County Welcomes Everyone". Torn down after the first day, the rainbow-colored sign was reinstalled only to be removed again without authorization. Wheeler began enlarging the display on the grounds, transforming his property into the Dancing Swallows Big Gay Bird Sanctuary and Memorial Pond. The sanctuary was created in honor of a deceased friend, Kali, and eventually grew to include birdhouses for swallows, decorated in colors associated with the gay pride movement. The land was sold in June 2024 and the private park was deemed closed.

== See also ==
- Atheist billboard
- He Gets Us
- The Last Billboard
- Miss Me Yet?
