= List of public art in Olympia, Washington =

List of public artworks in Olympia, Washington, U.S.

Winged Victory, one of many pieces of public art on the Washington State Capitol campus and elsewhere in Olympia

The following public artworks are or were installed in Olympia, Washington, in the United States.

== Capitol Campus ==
Works of art (originally) located on the Washington State Capitol Campus:

Arc of Statehood
This is a trail running through Heritage Park, (Note: 47°02′29″N 122°54′14″W) which is a 24 acres (9.7 ha) park located on the eastern shore of the north basin of Capitol Lake, comprising 39 plaques, one each to the counties of Washington state.
Boiler Works and Mysteries of Life
Located in front of Office Building 2, (Note: 47°02′10″N 122°53′52″W) (Note: 47°02′07″N 122°53′49″W) which was built in 1975 and which as of the 2020s houses the Department of Social and Health Services, these are respectively a sculpture by Thomas Jay and a stone carving by James Washington Jr..
Du Pen Fountain
Located next to the old State Library building (see later), (Note: 47°02′05″N 122°54′18″W), this fountain was designed by Everett Du Pen.
General Administration Building artworks
The GA Building houses an untitled mosaic by Jean C. Beall constructed from 150,000 tesserae cut from glass, marble, and granite in Venice and installed in 1959. It depicts the state's natural resources surrounding Paul Bunyan.
Korean War Memorial (Note: 47°02′07″N 122°53′59″W)
This is a sculpture of three soldiers from the Korean War dressed in helmets and ponchos and huddled around a campfire, one kneeling by the fire and the other two seated with their rifles. It was dedicated on 1993-07-24 and sculpted by Deborah Copenhaver.
Law Enforcement Memorial
This is located north of the Temple of Justice. (Note: 47°02′14″N 122°54′17″W) It was designed by John Swanson of the Portico Group, built by the Edifice Construction company, and dedicated in 2005. It commemorates law enforcement officers who were killed in the line of duty.
POW-MIA Memorial
This is a set of 16 granite slabs arranged semi-circle and inscribed with the names of 1,116 Vietnam War veterans who did not return from the war, listed in chronological order from 1975 onwards. Originally named the Vietnam Veterans Memorial and installed in 1982, this was re-designed by Kris Snider and re-dedicated on 1987-05-25. It is intended to represent the circle of life with the break in the circle representing the war.
Senate chamber
The murals in the debating chamber of the Washington State Senate are abstracts by Alden Mason that were installed in 1981.
State Library artworks
The old State Library building, designed in 1955 and since renamed the Joel M. Pritchard Building (Note: 47°02′04″N 122°54′18″W) in 1997, includes works by Kenneth Callahan, Mark Tobey, and James FitzGerald. The latter's is the mural in marble by what was the circulation desk (the library itself having been relocated to Tumwater after the 2001 Nisqually earthquake).
Territorial Sundial
This is a 6 feet (18 dm) diameter copper sundial located between the O'Brien and Cherberg Buildings (Note: 47°02′05″N 122°54′17″W) that was designed by John W. Elliot. Various events in the early history of Washington state are depicted on its face, which is also inscribed with the quote "Time is a sort of river of passing events, and strong in its current." from Marcus Aurelius.
The Twelve Labors of Hercules
This is a mural by Michael Spafford depicting the labours of Hercules that was originally installed in the debating chamber of the Washington House of Representatives. It was removed to Centralia Community College after some legislators accused it of being pornography.
The Shaman
This is a 8 by 13 feet (24 by 40 dm) sculpture in bronze located next to the Transportation Building. (Note: 47°02′05″N 122°53′50″W) It was designed by James Lee Hansen and installed in 1971. It depicts a Native American shaman, intended to represent "the enduring spirit of inquiry" and to be a prompt to those viewing it to contemplate their individual and collective identities.
Tivoli Fountain
A replica of Copenhagen's fountain in Tivoli Park and designed by the same architect, this is located in the centre of the oval lawn (Note: 47°02′11″N 122°54′06″W) that is in between Capitol Way and Winged Victory (see later). It was dedicated on 1953-04-15, a donation by the Olympia Tumwater Foundation, and repaired and re-dedicated in 2017.
Water Garden
This is a fountain, located in the plaza of the Employment Security Building, (Note: 47°02′06″N 122°53′57″W) that can be walked through. It was designed by Lawrence Halprin. Originally flowing over a set of towers into pools, the water was turned off permanently in 1992, because from its beginning the fountain suffered from water loss, including leakage into the underground parking garage below.
Winged Victory
This is a gilded bronze statue, located in the traffic circle that is in front of the Insurance Building. (Note: 47°02′12″N 122°54′12″W) It was sculpted by Alonzo V. Lewis and dedicated on 1938-05-30 in memoriam of the citizens of the state who had died in World War 1. A Winged Victory figure is surrounded by a Red Cross nurse, and a soldier, sailor, and marine in uniform. Its base has a bust of George Washington.
World War II Memorial
This memorial to people from Washington state who died in World War 2 is located on the north-east lawn of the West Campus. (Note: 47°02′16″N 122°54′07″W) It was designed by Simon Kogan, a local sculptor and Russian immigrant with relatives who had died in the War. A cluster of five 14-foot (43 dm) high bronze blades arranged in a star formation is engraved with 6,000 names of the dead. The names are engraved in such a way as to form "ghostly" images of servicemen when viewed from a distance. Next to those is a wheat field comprising 4,000 stalks, cast in bronze that is made from melted-down torpedo railings; a rock carving for each major battle of the war, some 3,000 granite tiles with the names of project donors and their messages; a bronze plaque describing the War; and an amphitheatre. Authorized by the state in 1995, the memorial was dedicated in 1999 on Memorial Day. It was re-dedicated on Pearl Harbor Day in 2010 after restoration as part of the state's US$258,000 (equivalent to $380,917 in 2025) restoration programme for all of the memorials in the Capitol Campus. Poor drainage that made water pool on the site had damaged the tiles, which had had to be replaced with paving stones; the patina had been lost on the bronze; and other parts of the monument had been vandalized.
Untitled
Designed by Lee Kelly in 1973, this sculpture took five years to build and was originally located on the west side of the Transportation Building. It was later moved to the north side (Note: 47°02′07″N 122°53′52″W) in 1999 as part of the East Campus Repair Project. Resembling Stonehenge, it is constructed from stainless steel and is 28 by 9 feet (85 by 27 dm) wide and tall.

== Other artworks ==
Works of art located elsewhere in Olympia include:

- The Kiss
- Sea to Sky
- Woman Dancing
