= George Washington Memorial Park (Paramus, New Jersey) =

Cemetery in Paramus, New Jersey, US

Coordinates: 40.94°N 74.087°W

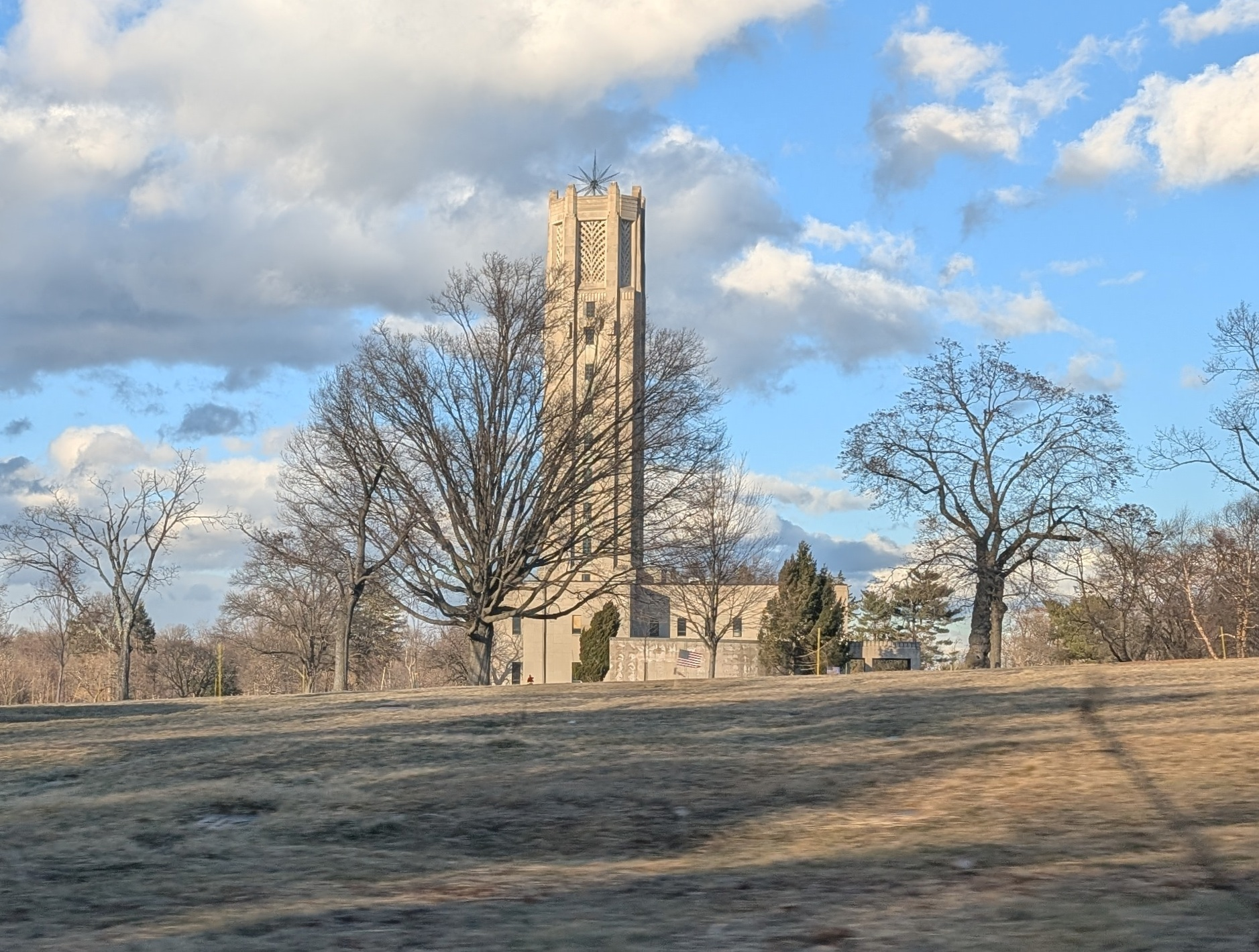
- Memorial tower in the cemetery
- Interactive map of George Washington Memorial Park

Details
- Established: 1939
- Location: Paramus, New Jersey
- Country: United States
- Type: Non denominational
- Size: 98 acres (40 ha)
- Find a Grave: George Washington Memorial Park

George Washington Memorial Park is a cemetery located in Paramus, in Bergen County, New Jersey, United States. It was established in 1939 as a "whites only" cemetery.

== Noted burials ==
- Vito Trause (1925–2019), United States Army veteran, World War II prisoner of war, and well-known community figure in New Jersey.
- Lamont Coleman (1974–1999), known professionally as Big L, American rapper and songwriter.
- Thomas Eboli, mobster and acting boss of the Genovese crime family.
- Elston Howard (1929–1980), Major League Baseball player, first African-American to play for the New York Yankees and the 1963 American League Most Valuable Player.
- O'Kelly Isley Jr. – member of The Isley Brothers R&B group.
- Rudolph Isley (1939–2023), musician, singer-songwriter.
- Charles L. Littel, founder and president of Junior College of Bergen County and Centralia Junior College.
- Lizette Parker (1971–2016), Mayor of Teaneck, New Jersey (2014–2016), first female African-American mayor of any municipality in Bergen County.
- Luther Vandross (1951–2005), rhythm and blues singer, dominant R&B artist on Billboard charts.
