= Vito Trause =

American soldier and World War II prisoner of war

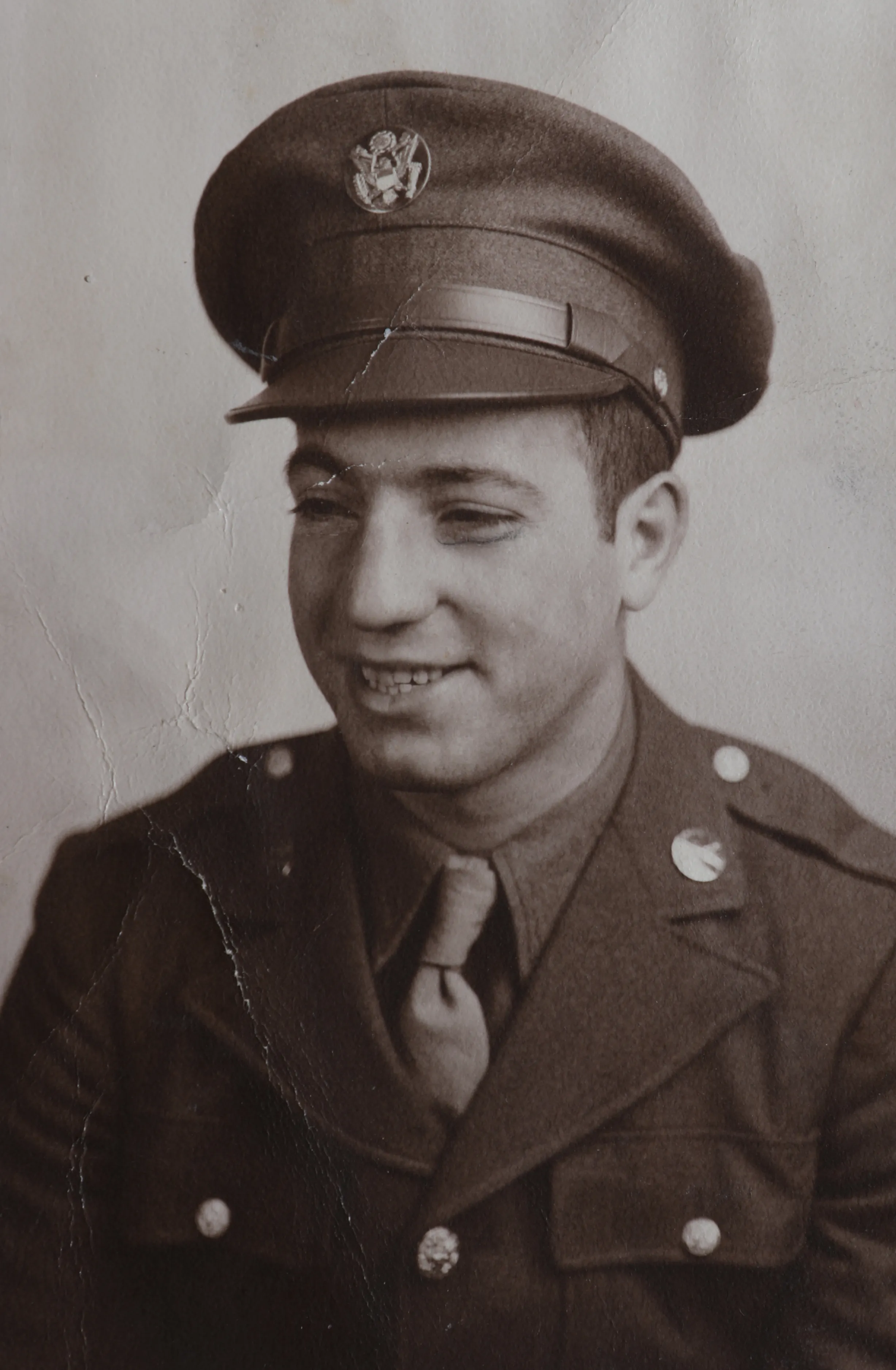
- Trause during World War II
- Born: July 19, 1925; Carlstadt, New Jersey, U.S.
- Died: October 31, 2019 (aged 94); Washington Township, Bergen County, New Jersey, U.S.
- Resting place: George Washington Memorial Park; 40°56′24″N 74°5′13.2″W
- Spouse: Theresa Iwanowski (m. 1952; died 2005)
- Children: 2
- Awards: European–African–Middle Eastern Campaign Medal with three bronze stars, World War II Victory Medal, American Campaign Medal, Army Good Conduct Medal

Vito Trause (July 19, 1925 – October 31, 2019) was an Italian-American soldier in the United States Army, prisoner of war during World War II, semi-professional athlete, and community figure in New Jersey.

By November 30, 1943, Trause dropped out of high school during his junior year in order to join the United States Army. As a private first-class, Trause trained in Africa and fought in the Italian Campaign, where he served in the United States infantry as a scout. He was captured by the SS outside of Florence in September 1944 and subsequently transported to Stalag VII-A, a camp for prisoners of war run by Nazi Germany, where he was held until he was liberated by American troops on May 2, 1945.

After the war, Trause returned to the United States, living in his hometown of Carlstadt, New Jersey. He competed as a semi-professional football and baseball athlete in the years following the war and married a receptionist from East Rutherford, New Jersey in June 1952. After moving to Clifton, New Jersey with his wife in 1952, he moved to Washington Township in Bergen County in 1967, where he lived the remainder of his life. In his later years, he became a well-known New Jersey community figure and gained international attention after being awarded his high school diploma at the age of 92. Following his death in October 2019, Trause was buried at George Washington Memorial Park in Paramus, New Jersey.

== Early life ==
Trause was born on July 19, 1925. He grew up in Carlstadt, New Jersey and received his elementary education at Carlstadt Public School, where he was a member of the school's choir. He later attended East Rutherford High School, where he played football and baseball. On November 30, 1943, Trause dropped out of high school during his junior year in order to enlist in the United States Army during World War II.

== World War II ==
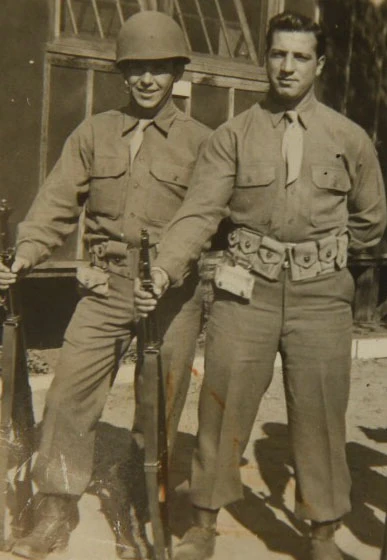
Vito Trause (right) circa 1945

=== Military service and capture ===
Trause received 17 weeks of infantry training at Fort McClellan in Alabama, before undergoing mountain warfare training in North Africa. Following the completion of his training, he traveled to Naples aboard a British troop transport to begin combat against the Italian Social Republic.

As a private first-class, Trause fought in the Italian Campaign, where he served as a scout in the 168th Regiment of the 34th Infantry Division. He participated in the Battle of Anzio and thereafter began participating in scouting operations on the Gothic Line. On the morning of September 24, 1944, Trause became separated from his fellow soldiers while on a scouting mission in the Apennine Mountains outside of Florence and hid inside of a nearby farmhouse. Later that day, Trause was ambushed by Waffen-SS soldiers and captured in the farmhouse. After briefly being taken to Bologna, he was subsequently transported by boxcar to Stalag VII-A, a camp for prisoners of war run by Nazi Germany, where he was held for much of the remainder of the war in Europe.

After his capture by the Nazis, Trause adopted the pseudonym of "Al", (Note: Some works, such as the 2007 memoir written by fellow prisoner-of-war Paul W. Church titled Cigarettes for Bread, refer to Trause as "Al".) fearing that referring to himself as "Vito" would expose his Italian heritage and subject him to the beatings experienced by other Italian-American prisoners of war. Several days after arriving at Stalag VII-A, however, he was assigned prisoner number 139217, by which he would be referred to throughout the remainder of his imprisonment.

While at Stalag VII-A, Nazi Germany subjected Trause to forced labor involving the repair of railroads that had been damaged by bombs dropped by the Royal Air Force and the recovery of corpses. Trause often found himself working alongside Jews imprisoned within Nazi concentration camps. Throughout the winter of 1945, he was not provided proper footwear by his German captors, leading to one of his feet becoming swollen. A Jewish prisoner who worked with Trause stole shoes from a corpse, smuggled them under his coat, and delivered them to Trause. Trause would go on to say the stolen footwear saved him from dying or having his foot amputated; Trause believed that the Jewish prisoner's actions saved his life.

While detained in the German prison camp, Trause subsisted on a diet of bread and potatoes. When he was liberated by American troops on May 2, 1945, Trause weighed 131 pounds (59 kg), some 35 pounds (16 kg) less than at the time of his capture.

After his liberation from the prison camp, Trause and several of his fellow prisoners-of-war obtained Harley-Davidson motorcycles with sidecars and began to drive towards Paris. Six days later, on the day that Nazi Germany surrendered to the Allies, Trause and his comrades arrived in the French capital. After convalescing in Paris, Trause embarked on a troop transport in Le Havre and returned to the United States.

=== Service awards ===
For his service during World War II, Trause earned the European–African–Middle Eastern Campaign Medal with three bronze stars, the World War II Victory Medal, the American Campaign Medal, the Army Good Conduct Medal, and Combat Infantryman Badge. He was also a Purple Heart recipient.

== Post-war life ==
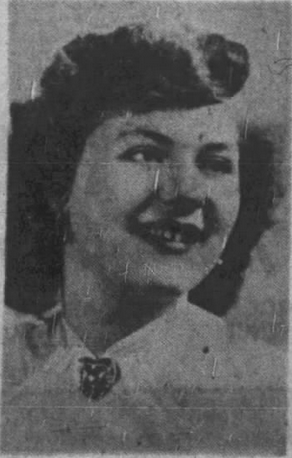
Theresa Iwanowski, Trause's soon-to-be wife, in 1951

After returning to the United States, Trause competed as a semi-professional athlete in both football and baseball. Trause was signed by the St. Louis Cardinals and briefly played baseball for its minor league affiliates. Trause was a semi-pro fullback, competing in the Bergen County Football League as a member of the Hackensack Angels and in the New Jersey Pro League as a member of the Passaic Red Devils. He also competed as a semi-pro baseball player for the Carlstadt Pros. Trause continued to play sports throughout much of his adult life, playing softball until he was over 70 years old.

Trause, a Catholic, joined the Catholic War Veterans in September 1948. He was also a member of the Knights of Columbus and the Veterans of Foreign Wars.

Throughout much of his adult life, Trause worked two jobs simultaneously; he worked for the East Rutherford Syringe Company and Magnavox.

=== Family life ===
Trause's mother died two years after Trause returned to New Jersey following the Second World War.

Trause married Theresa Iwanowski, an East Rutherford receptionist, on June 7, 1952. The pair moved to Clifton, New Jersey and had two daughters, Cynthia and Victoria. The family moved to Washington Township, a town in Bergen County, New Jersey, in 1967. Trause remained married to his wife until she died on August 6, 2005.

== Later years and death ==
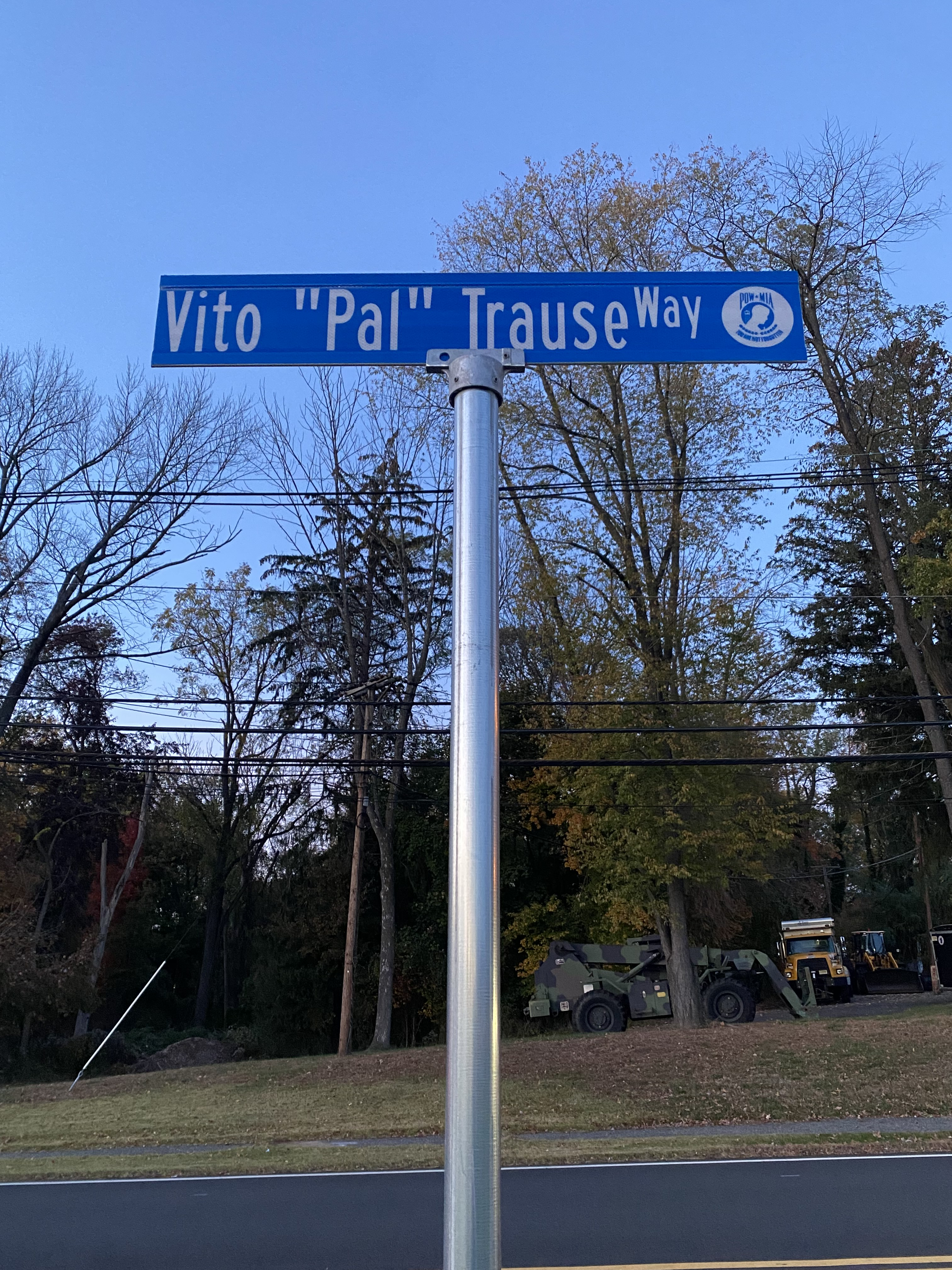
Vito "Pal" Trause Way in Washington Township, Bergen County, New Jersey

=== Community presence ===
In his later years, Trause became a community figure in New Jersey. He was known as the "daytime mayor" of Washington Township, the town in which he resided in Bergen County, New Jersey. He was also known as a Westwood Regional High School athletics super-fan and booster, and as a mentor both to high school students and many members of his community at large.

==== Local honors ====
Locals considered Trause to be a war hero. In July 2015, a parade was held in honor of his 90th birthday in Washington Township; among the participants were a brigade of police cars, firetrucks, and 20 motorcycle riders of the Carlstadt-based Nam Knights of America. At a June 2018 ceremony, Trause was awarded his high school diploma at the age of 92, at Henry P. Becton Regional High School as a part of the New Jersey Department of Education Operation Recognition program. With military commanders in attendance, the school's principal awarded him a diploma from East Rutherford High School as well as replicas of each of the awards that Trause had received as a result of his military service during the Second World War. Four months later, the Borough of Carlstadt renamed a portion of its Lincoln Street after Trause, who had grown up on the street during his childhood. In January 2019, the New York Knicks presented Trause with an honorary jersey and a graduation cap signed by its players.

In May 2019, just over five months before his death, Washington Township and the Borough of Westwood, New Jersey each petitioned the Bergen County Board of Chosen Freeholders to rename the stretch of the township's Ridgewood Road in front of Westwood Regional High School in honor of Trause.

=== Death ===
Trause died suddenly on Halloween in 2019, after attending a party with a local senior organization. His daughter attributed his death to heart and lung problems. He was buried at George Washington Memorial Park in Paramus, New Jersey.

Following Trause's death, a memorial trust was established in his name to provide college scholarships for graduates of Westwood Regional High School.
