= Alden Mason =

Alden Mason may refer to:

- John Alden Mason (1885–1967), archaeological anthropologist and linguist
- Alden Mason (artist) (1919–2013), American painter
