= Eleanor Young =

Eleanor Young may refer to:

- Eleanor Anne Young, Catholic religious sister, research scientist, and educator
- Eleanor Winthrop Young, British climber
- Eleanor Young (Crazy Rich Asians), a character from the film Crazy Rich Asians
- Eleanor Young Love, née Young, African-American librarian
