= Carlstadt, New Jersey =

Borough in Bergen County, New Jersey, US

- Borough
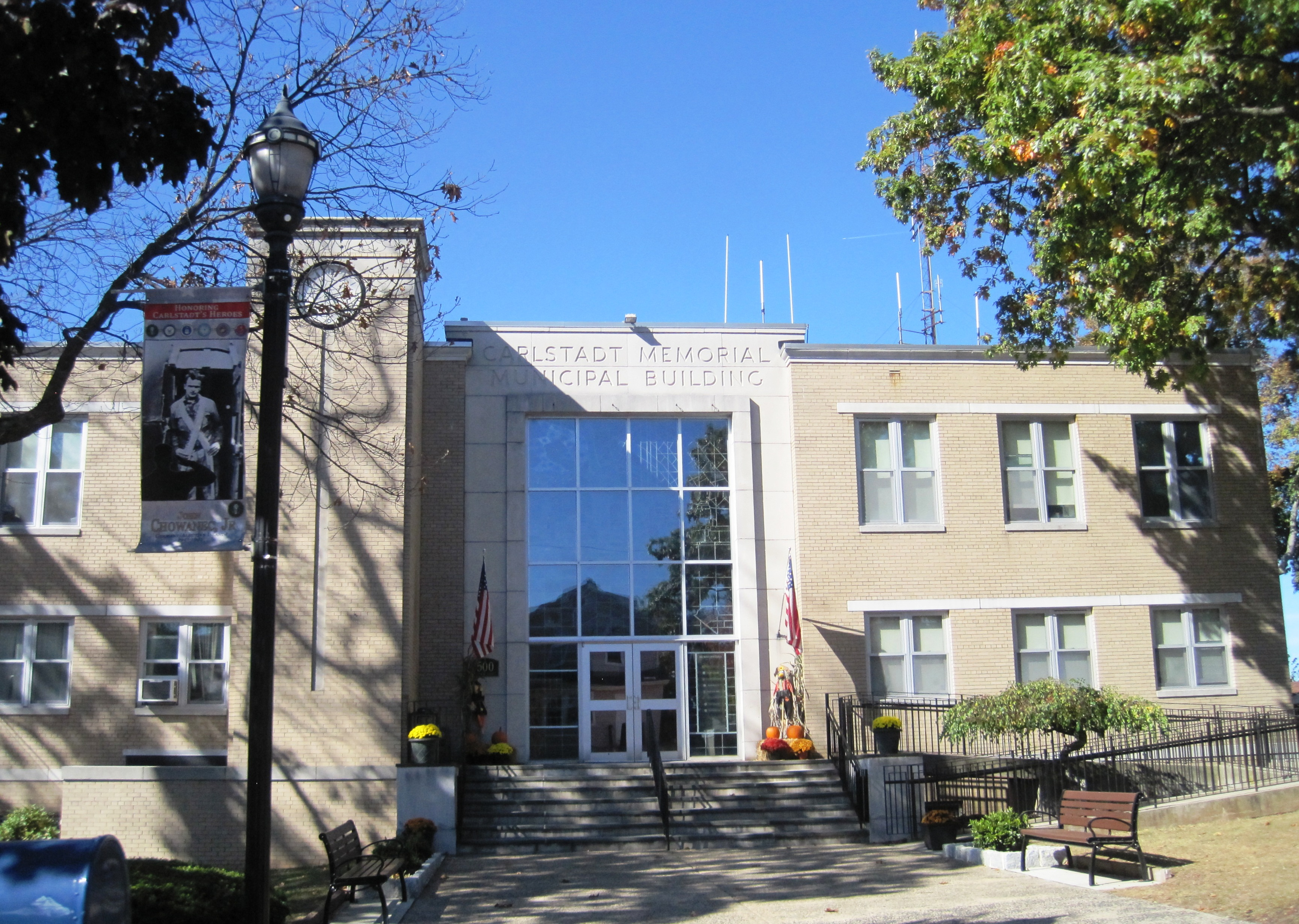
- Carlstadt Memorial Municipal Building, seen from Madison Street

- Seal

- Location of Carlstadt in Bergen County highlighted in red (left). Inset map: Location of Bergen County in New Jersey highlighted in orange (right).

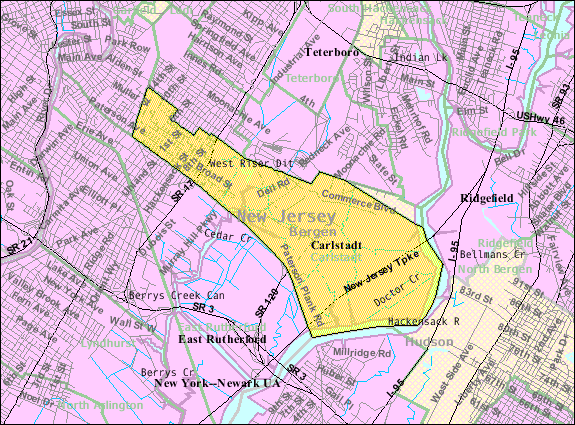
- Census Bureau map of Carlstadt, New Jersey

- Location in Bergen County Location in New Jersey Location in the United States
- Coordinates: 40.826431°N 74.062335°W
- Country: United States
- State: New Jersey
- County: Bergen
- Incorporated: June 27, 1894
- Named for: Carl Klein

Government
  - Type: Borough
  - Body: Borough Council
  - Mayor: Robert J. Zimmermann (R, term ends December 31, 2027)
  - Operations manager: Joe Crifasi
  - Municipal clerk: Claire Foy

Area
  - Total: 4.21 sq mi (10.90 km^{2})
  - Land: 3.95 sq mi (10.22 km^{2})
  - Water: 0.26 sq mi (0.67 km^{2}) 6.18%
  - Rank: 291st of 565 in state 18th of 70 in county
- Elevation: 13 ft (4.0 m)

Population (2020)
  - Total: 6,372
  - Estimate (2023): 6,333
  - Rank: 331st of 565 in state 54th of 70 in county
  - Density: 1,614.4/sq mi (623.3/km^{2})
  - Rank: 327th of 565 in state 62nd of 70 in county
- Time zone: UTC−05:00 (Eastern (EST))
  - Summer (DST): UTC−04:00 (Eastern (EDT))
- ZIP Code: 07072
- Area code: 201
- FIPS code: 3400310480
- GNIS feature ID: 0885180
- Website: www.carlstadtnj.us

Carlstadt is a borough in Bergen County, in the U.S. state of New Jersey. As of the 2020 United States census, the borough's population was 6,372, an increase of 245 (+4.0%) from the 2010 census count of 6,127, which in turn reflected an increase of 210 (+3.5%) from the 5,917 counted in the 2000 census.

Carlstadt was originally formed as a village by an act of the New Jersey Legislature on March 12, 1860, within Lodi Township. Most sources indicate that the community was named for Carl Klein, the leader of a group of early German settlers who led the project to establish the community though Henry Gannett stated that the name derived from the city of Karlovac in Croatia, which was known as "Carlstadt" in German. The Borough of Carlstadt was incorporated on June 27, 1894, formally set off from Bergen Township. The borough was formed during the "Boroughitis" phenomenon then sweeping through Bergen County, in which 26 boroughs were formed in the county in 1894 alone.

== Geography ==
According to the United States Census Bureau, the borough had a total area of 4.21 square miles (10.90 km^{2}), including 3.95 square miles (10.22 km^{2}) of land and 0.26 square miles (0.67 km^{2}) of water (6.18%).

Carlstadt is bordered on the south by East Rutherford in Bergen County, Secaucus and North Bergen in Hudson County, on the north by Wood-Ridge and Moonachie (Bergen) to the east by Ridgefield and South Hackensack (Bergen), and to the northwest by Wallington (Bergen). The borough is approximately 8 miles (13 km) northwest of New York City and 95 miles (153 km) northeast of Philadelphia.

== Demographics ==
Historical population
Census	Pop.	Note	%±
1880	1,060		—
1890	1,549		46.1%
1900	2,920		88.5%
1910	3,807		30.4%
1920	4,472		17.5%
1930	5,425		21.3%
1940	5,644		4.0%
1950	5,591		−0.9%
1960	6,042		8.1%
1970	6,724		11.3%
1980	6,166		−8.3%
1990	5,510		−10.6%
2000	5,917		7.4%
2010	6,127		3.5%
2020	6,372		4.0%
2023 (est.)	6,333	▼	−0.6%
Population sources: 1880–1890; 1890–1920 1890–1910; 1910–1930 1900–2020; 2000 2010 2020

=== Racial and ethnic composition ===
Carlstadt borough, Bergen County, New Jersey – Racial and ethnic composition Note: the US Census treats Hispanic/Latino as an ethnic category. This table excludes Latinos from the racial categories and assigns them to a separate category. Hispanics/Latinos may be of any race.
Race / Ethnicity (NH = Non-Hispanic)	Pop 2000	Pop 2010	Pop 2020	% 2000	% 2010	% 2020
White alone (NH)	4,970	4,312	3,855	84.00%	70.38%	60.50%
Black or African American alone (NH)	64	122	132	1.08%	1.99%	2.07%
Native American or Alaska Native alone (NH)	4	5	10	0.07%	0.08%	0.16%
Asian alone (NH)	366	499	608	6.19%	8.14%	9.54%
Native Hawaiian or Pacific Islander alone (NH)	1	2	0	0.02%	0.03%	0.00%
Other race alone (NH)	9	22	41	0.15%	0.36%	0.64%
Mixed race or Multiracial (NH)	30	61	144	0.51%	1.00%	2.26%
Hispanic or Latino (any race)	473	1,104	1,582	7.99%	18.02%	24.83%
Total	5,917	6,127	6,372	100.00%	100.00%	100.00%

=== 2020 census ===
As of the 2020 census, Carlstadt had a population of 6,372. The median age was 41.9 years. 18.4% of residents were under the age of 18 and 17.6% of residents were 65 years of age or older. For every 100 females there were 95.6 males, and for every 100 females age 18 and over there were 94.1 males age 18 and over.

All residents lived in urban areas.

There were 2,429 households in Carlstadt, of which 28.8% had children under the age of 18 living in them. Of all households, 47.4% were married-couple households, 18.2% were households with a male householder and no spouse or partner present, and 27.3% were households with a female householder and no spouse or partner present. About 23.5% of all households were made up of individuals and 10.0% had someone living alone who was 65 years of age or older.

There were 2,563 housing units, of which 5.2% were vacant. The homeowner vacancy rate was 1.8% and the rental vacancy rate was 3.5%.

=== 2010 census ===
The 2010 United States census counted 6,127 people, 2,378 households, and 1,579 families in the borough. The population density was 1,532.1 per square mile (591.5/km^{2}). There were 2,495 housing units at an average density of 623.9 per square mile (240.9/km^{2}). The racial makeup was 81.41% (4,988) White, 2.38% (146) Black or African American, 0.16% (10) Native American, 8.23% (504) Asian, 0.07% (4) Pacific Islander, 5.35% (328) from other races, and 2.40% (147) from two or more races. Hispanic or Latino of any race were 18.02% (1,104) of the population.

Of the 2,378 households, 27.7% had children under the age of 18; 49.4% were married couples living together; 11.9% had a female householder with no husband present and 33.6% were non-families. Of all households, 26.5% were made up of individuals and 10.3% had someone living alone who was 65 years of age or older. The average household size was 2.58 and the average family size was 3.18.

20.2% of the population were under the age of 18, 8.1% from 18 to 24, 28.6% from 25 to 44, 27.7% from 45 to 64, and 15.3% who were 65 years of age or older. The median age was 40.5 years. For every 100 females, the population had 95.1 males. For every 100 females ages 18 and older there were 92.1 males.

The Census Bureau's 2006–2010 American Community Survey showed that (in 2010 inflation-adjusted dollars) median household income was $62,255 (with a margin of error of +/− $9,455) and the median family income was $71,506 (+/− $5,117). Males had a median income of $50,994 (+/− $7,494) versus $41,333 (+/− $6,468) for females. The per capita income for the borough was $30,403 (+/− $3,646). About 7.2% of families and 6.8% of the population were below the poverty line, including 3.0% of those under age 18 and 6.0% of those age 65 or over.

Same-sex couples headed 14 households in 2010, an increase from the 11 counted in 2000.

=== 2000 census ===
As of the 2000 United States census there were 5,917 people, 2,393 households, and 1,593 families residing in the borough. The population density was 1,496.4 inhabitants per square mile (577.8/km^{2}). There were 2,473 housing units at an average density of 625.4 per square mile (241.5/km^{2}). The racial makeup of the borough was 88.90% White, 1.37% African American, 0.08% Native American, 6.19% Asian, 0.02% Pacific Islander, 2.13% from other races, and 1.32% from two or more races. Hispanic or Latino people of any race were 7.99% of the population.

There were 2,393 households, out of which 25.7% had children under the age of 18 living with them, 51.9% were married couples living together, 10.8% had a female householder with no husband present, and 33.4% were non-families. 26.4% of all households were made up of individuals, and 9.6% had someone living alone who was 65 years of age or older. The average household size was 2.47 and the average family size was 3.04.

In the borough the age distribution of the population shows 19.0% under the age of 18, 7.7% from 18 to 24, 34.0% from 25 to 44, 24.0% from 45 to 64, and 15.3% who were 65 years of age or older. The median age was 39 years. For every 100 females, there were 94.1 males. For every 100 females age 18 and over, there were 92.4 males.

The median income for a household in the borough was $55,058, and the median income for a family was $62,040. Males had a median income of $46,540 versus $36,804 for females. The per capita income for the borough was $28,713. About 3.1% of families and 6.1% of the population were below the poverty line, including 7.8% of those under age 18 and 4.3% of those age 65 or over.

== Economy ==
Corporate residents include:

- Lion Brand Yarns, America's oldest manufacturer of craft yarn.
- Pantone, corporation headquartered in Carlstadt, supplying color space to the printing industry.
- Yoo-hoo, a chocolate drink manufactured by Keurig Dr Pepper.

== Government ==
=== Local government ===
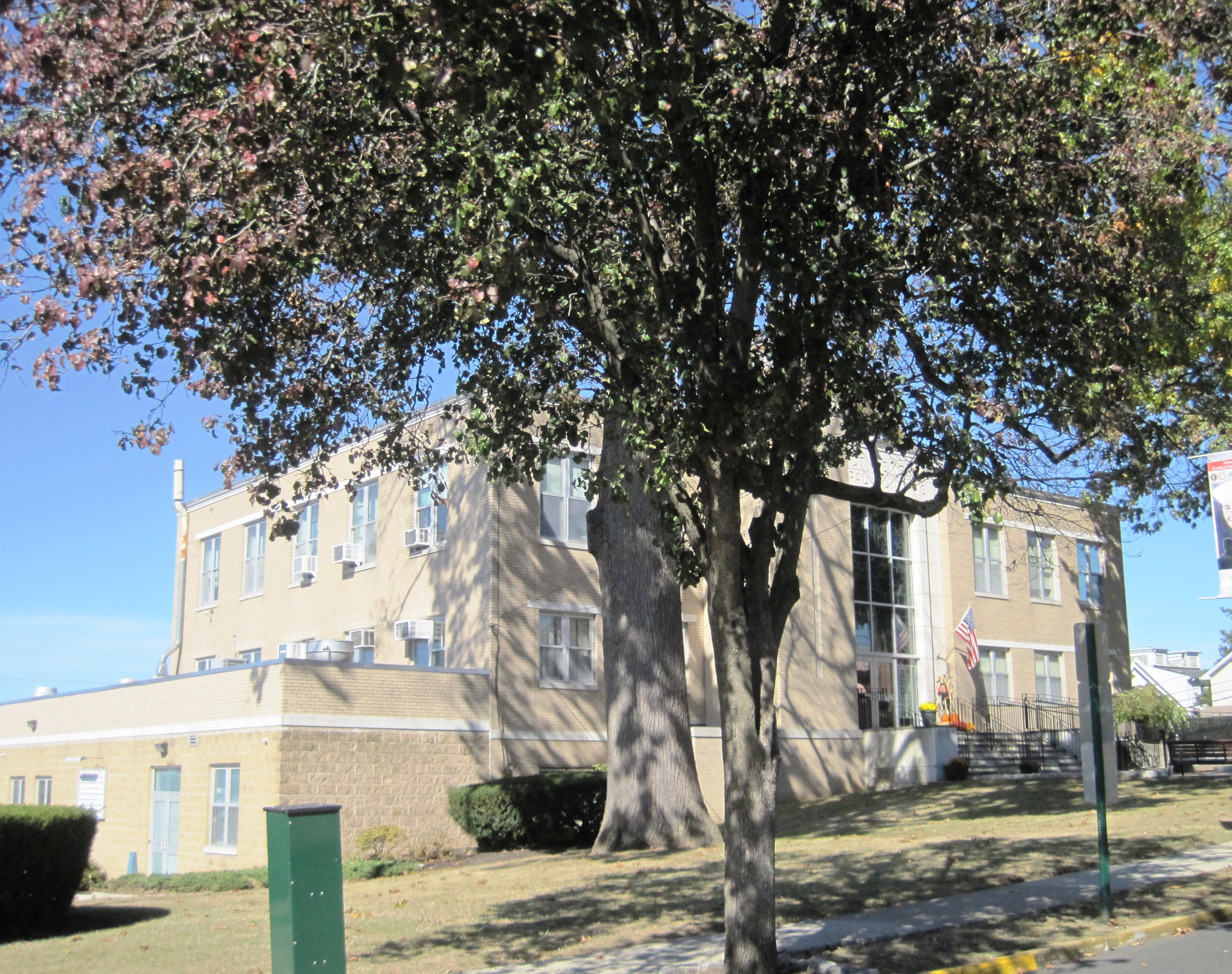
Carlstadt Memorial Municipal Building, side view

Carlstadt is governed under the borough form of New Jersey municipal government, which is used in 218 municipalities (of the 564) statewide, making it the most common form of government in New Jersey. The governing body is comprised of a mayor and a borough council, with all positions elected at-large on a partisan basis as part of the November general election. A mayor is elected directly by the voters to a four-year term of office. The borough council includes six members elected to serve three-year terms on a staggered basis, with two seats coming up for election each year in a three-year cycle. The borough form of government is a "weak mayor / strong council" government in which council members act as the legislative body with the mayor presiding at meetings and voting only in the event of a tie. The mayor can veto ordinances subject to an override by a two-thirds majority vote of the council. The mayor makes committee and liaison assignments for council members, and most appointments are made by the mayor with the advice and consent of the council.

As of 2026, the mayor of Carlstadt is Republican Robert J. Zimmermann, whose term of office ends December 31, 2027. Members of the Borough Council are Diane DeBiase (R, 2027), Joseph T. Emerson (R, 2026), Suzanne M. Fonseca (R, 2028), James A. Lenoy (R, 2026), William J. Roseman (R, 2027) and David A. Stoltz (R, 2028).

In January 2014, Joseph Emerson was appointed from among three nominees offered to fill the vacant seat of Dennis Ritchie that was scheduled to expire in December 2014.

Carlstadt and Wallington share a municipal court, which meets in Carlstadt.

=== Federal, state and county representation ===
Carlstadt is located in the 9th Congressional District and is part of New Jersey's 36th state legislative district.

For the 119th United States Congress, New Jersey's 9th congressional district is represented by Nellie Pou (D, North Haledon) New Jersey is represented in the United States Senate by Democrats Cory Booker (Newark, term ends 2027) and Andy Kim (Moorestown, term ends 2031).

For the 2026–2027 session, the 36th legislative district of the New Jersey Legislature is represented in the State Senate by Paul Sarlo (D, Wood-Ridge) and in the General Assembly by Clinton Calabrese (D, Cliffside Park) and Gary Schaer (D, Passaic).

Bergen County is governed by a directly elected County Executive, with legislative functions performed by a Board of County Commissioners comprised of seven members who are elected at-large to three-year terms in partisan elections on a staggered basis, with either two or three seats coming up for election each November; a Chairman and Vice Chairman are selected from among its seven members at a reorganization meeting held every January. As of 2025, the county executive is James J. Tedesco III (D, Paramus), whose four-year term of office ends December 31, 2026.

Bergen County's Commissioners are Chair Mary J. Amoroso (D, Mahwah, 2025), Vice Chair Steven A. Tanelli (D, North Arlington, 2027), Chair Pro Tem Joan Voss (D, Fort Lee, 2026), Rafael Marte (D, Bergenfield, 2026), Germaine M. Ortiz (D, Emerson, 2025), Thomas J. Sullivan Jr. (D, Montvale, 2025) and Tracy Silna Zur (D, Franklin Lakes, 2027).

Bergen County's elected constitutional officials are Clerk John S. Hogan (D, Northvale, 2026), Sheriff Anthony Cureton (D, Englewood, 2027) and Surrogate Michael R. Dressler (D, Cresskill, 2026).

=== Politics ===
Presidential election results

United States presidential election results for Carlstadt
Year	Republican		Democratic		Third party(ies)	
Year	No.	%	No.	%	No.	%
2024	1,759	58.11%	1,207	39.87%	61	2.02%
2020	1,665	50.36%	1,608	48.64%	33	1.00%
2016	1,462	50.85%	1,289	44.83%	124	4.31%
2012	1,165	44.47%	1,416	54.05%	39	1.49%
2008	1,481	52.24%	1,316	46.42%	38	1.34%
2004	1,414	50.07%	1,377	48.76%	33	1.17%
2000	1,125	42.61%	1,420	53.79%	95	3.60%
1996	979	35.68%	1,397	50.91%	368	13.41%
1992	1,375	49.19%	942	33.70%	478	17.10%
1988	1,924	63.50%	1,094	36.11%	12	0.40%
1984	2,158	68.42%	986	31.26%	10	0.32%
1980	1,648	57.16%	972	33.71%	263	9.12%
1976	1,863	60.10%	1,166	37.61%	71	2.29%
1972	2,306	70.84%	893	27.43%	56	1.72%
1968	1,762	53.52%	1,228	37.30%	302	9.17%
1964	1,146	37.06%	1,939	62.71%	7	0.23%
1960	1,798	59.46%	1,221	40.38%	5	0.17%

As of March 2011, there were a total of 3,420 registered voters in Carlstadt, of which 897 (26.2% vs. 31.7% countywide) were registered as Democrats, 734 (21.5% vs. 21.1%) were registered as Republicans and 1,788 (52.3% vs. 47.1%) were registered as Unaffiliated. There was one voter registered to another party. Among the borough's 2010 Census population, 55.8% (vs. 57.1% in Bergen County) were registered to vote, including 70.0% of those ages 18 and over (vs. 73.7% countywide).

In the 2016 presidential election, Republican Donald Trump received 1,462 votes (50.9% vs. 41.1% countywide), ahead of Democrat Hillary Clinton with 1,289 votes (44.8% vs. 54.2% countywide) and other candidates with 124 votes (4.3% vs. 4.6% countywide), among the 2,924 votes cast by the borough's 3,860 registered voters for a turnout of 75.7% (vs. 72.5% in Bergen County). In the 2012 presidential election, Democrat Barack Obama received 1,416 votes (53.5% vs. 54.8% countywide), ahead of Republican Mitt Romney with 1,165 votes (44.0% vs. 43.5%) and other candidates with 34 votes (1.3% vs. 0.9%), among the 2,646 ballots cast by the borough's 3,663 registered voters, for a turnout of 72.2% (vs. 70.4% in Bergen County). In the 2008 presidential election, Republican John McCain received 1,481 votes (51.9% vs. 44.5% countywide), ahead of Democrat Barack Obama with 1,316 votes (46.1% vs. 53.9%) and other candidates with 34 votes (1.2% vs. 0.8%), among the 2,854 ballots cast by the borough's 3,707 registered voters, for a turnout of 77.0% (vs. 76.8% in Bergen County).

Gubernatorial election results for Carlstadt
Year	Republican		Democratic		Third party(ies)	
Year	No.	%	No.	%	No.	%
2025	1,175	51.20%	1,108	48.28%	12	0.52%
2021	1,138	59.09%	777	40.34%	11	0.57%
2017	641	44.21%	724	49.93%	85	5.86%
2013	997	60.50%	628	38.11%	23	1.40%
2009	942	51.06%	773	41.90%	130	7.05%
2005	896	45.46%	1,010	51.24%	65	3.30%

In the 2013 gubernatorial election, Republican Chris Christie received 60.5% of the vote (997 cast), ahead of Democrat Barbara Buono with 38.1% (628 votes), and other candidates with 1.4% (23 votes), among the 1,694 ballots cast by the borough's 3,520 registered voters (46 ballots were spoiled), for a turnout of 48.1%. In the 2009 gubernatorial election, Republican Chris Christie received 942 votes (50.2% vs. 45.8% countywide), ahead of Democrat Jon Corzine with 773 votes (41.2% vs. 48.0%), Independent Chris Daggett with 115 votes (6.1% vs. 4.7%) and other candidates with 15 votes (0.8% vs. 0.5%), among the 1,878 ballots cast by the borough's 3,551 registered voters, yielding a 52.9% turnout (vs. 50.0% in the county).

United States Senate election results for Carlstadt1
Year	Republican		Democratic		Third party(ies)	
Year	No.	%	No.	%	No.	%
2024	1,521	55.76%	1,121	41.09%	86	3.15%
2018	1,014	48.59%	994	47.63%	79	3.79%
2012	997	41.65%	1,348	56.31%	49	2.05%
2006	941	49.68%	914	48.26%	39	2.06%

United States Senate election results for Carlstadt2
Year	Republican		Democratic		Third party(ies)	
Year	No.	%	No.	%	No.	%
2020	1,508	47.63%	1,575	49.75%	83	2.62%
2014	353	32.81%	688	63.94%	35	3.25%
2013	473	54.00%	396	45.21%	7	0.80%
2008	1,243	48.82%	1,274	50.04%	29	1.14%

== Education ==
Public school students in pre-kindergarten through eighth grade are served by the Carlstadt Public Schools. As of the 2023–24 school year, the district, comprised of one school, had an enrollment of 523 students and 43.5 classroom teachers (on an FTE basis), for a student–teacher ratio of 12.0:1. With the opening of the Carlstadt Public School in 2007, which now serves all of Carlstadt's K–8 students, the Lincoln and Washington school sites have been turned over to the borough and plans have been developed to convert the sites to senior housing.

For ninth through twelfth grades, public school students attend the Henry P. Becton Regional High School in East Rutherford, which serves high school students from both Carlstadt and East Rutherford as part of the Carlstadt-East Rutherford Regional School District. As of the 2023–24 school year, the high school had an enrollment of 821 students and 61.5 classroom teachers (on an FTE basis), for a student–teacher ratio of 13.4:1. Seats on the high school district's nine-member board of education are allocated based on the population of the constituent municipalities, with four seats allocated to Carlstadt.

Public school students from the borough, and all of Bergen County, are eligible to attend the secondary education programs offered by the Bergen County Technical Schools, which include the Bergen County Academies in Hackensack, and the Bergen Tech campus in Teterboro or Paramus. The district offers programs on a shared-time or full-time basis, with admission based on a selective application process and tuition covered by the student's home school district.

== Emergency services ==
=== Police ===
The Carlstadt Police Department is headed by Police Chief Thomas Cox. The department's first chief, Charles Schmidt, was appointed in 1907.

=== Fire ===
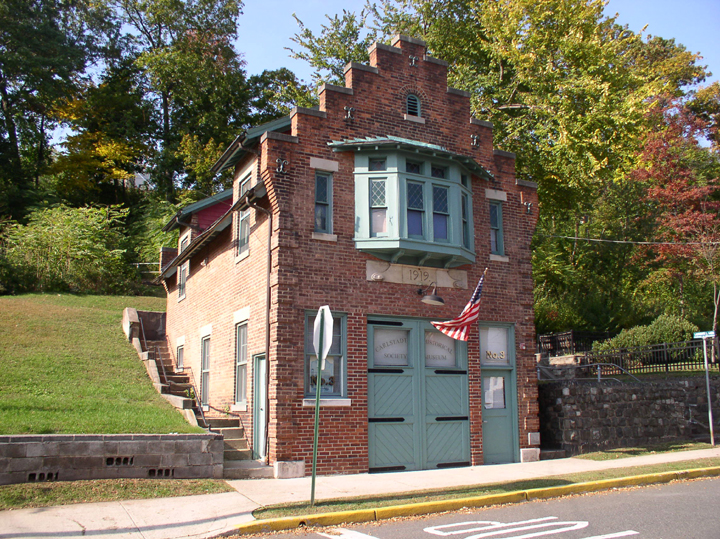
Former firehouse, now home to the Carlstadt Historical Society

The Carlstadt Fire Department (CFD) is an all-volunteer fire department. The CFD was organized in March 1872 and consists of one Chief, one assistant chief, one deputy chief and one battalion chief. The department is staffed by 80 fully trained firefighters. The CFD utilizes three engines, a ladder truck, a heavy rescue vehicle, and a boat. The Chief of Department for 2024 is Bob Ruff, Assistant Chief is James Schmidt, Deputy Chief is Jay Murphy, and Battalion Chief is Walter Stankiewicz.

=== Ambulance ===
Emergency medical services are provided in the borough by the Carlstadt Volunteer Ambulance Corps (CVAC), established on January 1, 1974. The charitable organization has roughly 25 volunteer members on the roster (Emergency Medical Technicians and First Responders). CVAC is led by a corps voted Captain and Lieutenant, and are managed by a Board of Officers composed solely of corps members. CVAC is part of NJ's First Aid Council, District 24. CVAC is based out of a borough-owned building at 424 Hackensack Street. They currently operate two Ford ambulances and a Ford utility vehicle, also owned by the borough. CVAC responds to approximately 1,500 emergency calls per year.

== Transportation ==
=== Roads and highways ===
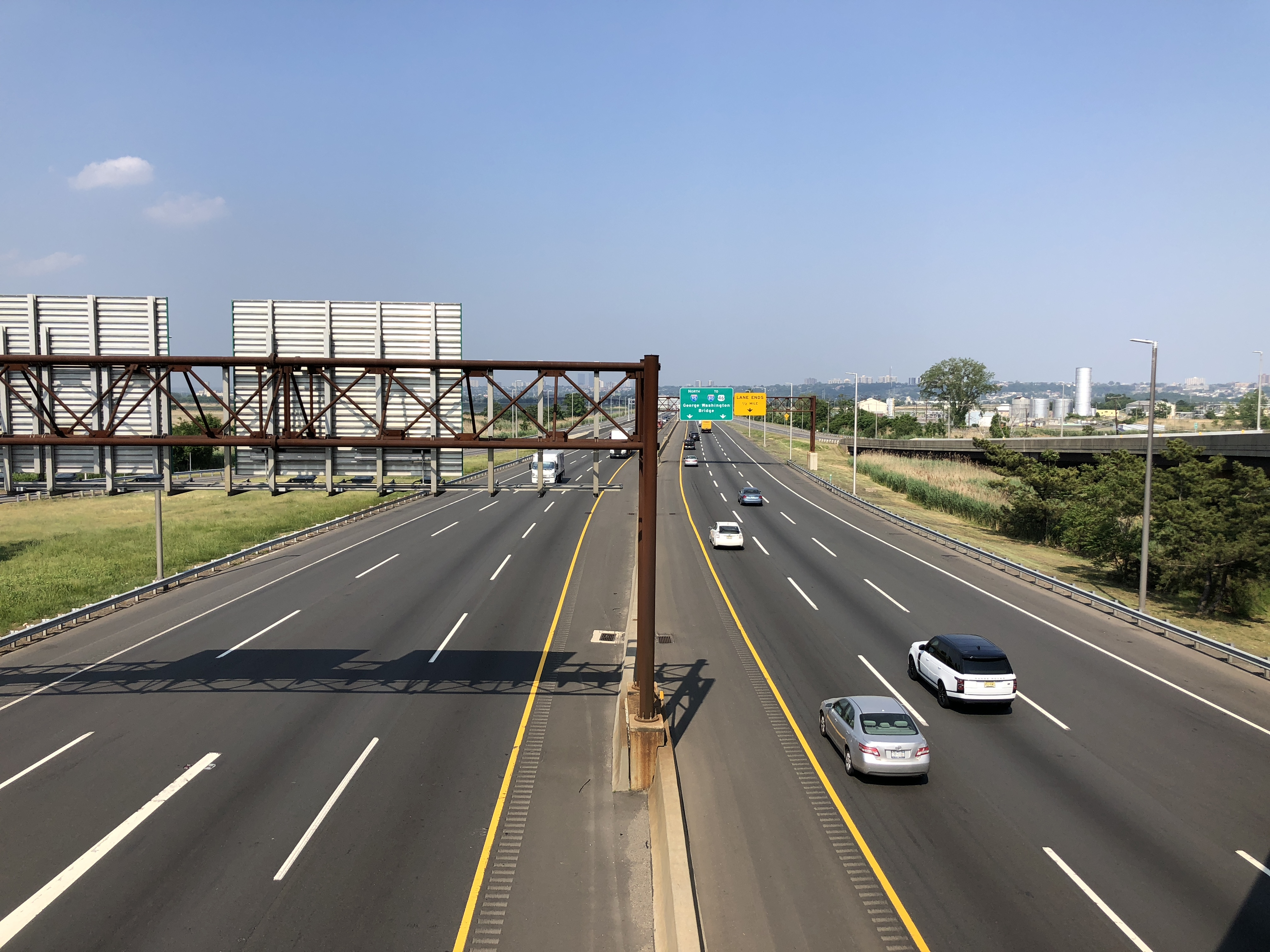
The New Jersey Turnpike (Interstate 95) in Carlstadt

As of May 2010, the borough had a total of 27.82 miles (44.77 km) of roadways, of which 21.48 miles (34.57 km) were maintained by the municipality, 2.85 miles (4.59 km) by Bergen County and 1.36 miles (2.19 km) by the New Jersey Department of Transportation and 2.13 miles (3.43 km) by the New Jersey Turnpike Authority.

Route 120, County Route 503, and the western spur of the New Jersey Turnpike (Interstate 95) serve Carlstadt. No interchange from the turnpike directly serves Carlstadt, but there is an entry and exit point for the Meadowlands Sports Complex. The 18W high-speed tollgate is located in the borough, but the nearest turnpike interchange is in East Rutherford.

=== Public transportation ===
NJ Transit bus service is available to and from the Port Authority Bus Terminal in Midtown Manhattan on the 161, 163 and 164 routes; to Newark on the 76; and to other New Jersey communities served on the 703 and 772 routes.

Carlstadt once had a rail station on the Hackensack and New York Railroad (later reformed as the New Jersey and New York Railroad), which closed in 1967, and was located on tracks that are used by NJ Transit's Pascack Valley Line.

== Notable people ==
People who were born in, residents of, or otherwise closely associated with Carlstadt include:

- Ernest Cuneo (1905–1988), professional football player, lawyer, newspaperman, author and spy
- Mark DeRosa (born 1975), baseball analyst and retired MLB third baseman / outfielder
- Dutch Dorman (1902–1988), long-time minor league baseball player and manager who was a scout for the Philadelphia Phillies and Atlanta Braves
- Robert P. Hollenbeck (1931–2021), politician who served six terms in the New Jersey General Assembly from the 36th Legislative District
- Darren Lemke (born 1969/1970), screenwriter who co-wrote the 2010 film Shrek Forever After and director of the 2004 thriller film Lost, which he also wrote
- Lou Lombardo (1928–2001), MLB pitcher who appeared in two games for the New York Giants in 1948
- Marc Rizzo (born 1977), lead guitarist of Brazilian metal band Soulfly
- Pete Rohrman (born 1970), operations manager and political activist
- Vito Trause (1925–2019), World War II United States Army veteran and prisoner of war

== Sources ==
- Clayton, W. Woodford; and Nelson, Nelson. History of Bergen and Passaic Counties, New Jersey, with Biographical Sketches of Many of its Pioneers and Prominent Men. Philadelphia: Everts and Peck, 1882.
- Harvey, Cornelius Burnham (ed.), Genealogical History of Hudson and Bergen Counties, New Jersey. New York: New Jersey Genealogical Publishing Co., 1900.
- Van Valen, James M. History of Bergen County, New Jersey. New York: New Jersey Publishing and Engraving Co., 1900.
- Westervelt, Frances A. (Frances Augusta), 1858–1942, History of Bergen County, New Jersey, 1630–1923, Lewis Historical Publishing Company, 1923.
- Municipal Incorporations of the State of New Jersey (according to Counties) prepared by the Division of Local Government, Department of the Treasury (New Jersey); December 1, 1958.
