= Wenonah Bell =

American painter

Wenonah Day Bell (1890–1981) was an American painter known for depictions of rural life in the southern United States and urban scenes of New York.

Bell was a native of Trenton, South Carolina, and the daughter of a Baptist minister. The Bell family lived in numerous small towns throughout the Piedmont region during Bell's childhood. They eventually settling in Gainesville, Georgia, where her father established a ministry.

Bell's artistic training began at Gainesville's Brenau College, which was followed by studies at the University of Pennsylvania and the Pennsylvania Academy of the Fine Arts. At the latter, she won the Cresson Traveling Scholarship, the Second Toppan Prize and the Mary Smith Prize. Her diverse education included lessons at the Académie Colarossi in Paris, the Hans Hoffmann School of Fine Arts in Munich and Capri, and at Teachers College, Columbia University.

Bell taught art for a time at Bergen Junior College, and for nearly thirty years lived in New York City, where she was on the faculty of the Parsons School of Design. Periodically throughout her life, Bell would return to the South to sketch, paint, and find artistic inspiration. In addition to teaching and painting, she also penned a memoir, The Restless Bells, documenting her family's history from Reconstruction through World War II. The book was published in 1973. When her health began to decline after the book's completion, Bell relocated to Georgia, where she died in 1981.

Bell's style was based on that of the Impressionists, but was informed by certain modernist sensibilities as well. She was known for her depictions both of the rural life of the southern United States and of the New York urban scene; she also produced portraits and still lifes, and worked in both oils and watercolor. A Table Top Still Life of c. 1930, in oil on canvas, is in the collection of the Morris Museum of Art. Another oil, Peach Packing, Spartanburg County of 1938, is owned by the Johnson Collection of art of the southern United States. Bell is also represented in the collection of the Vanderpoel Memorial Art Gallery in Chicago.
