= Lion Brand Yarns =

Business enterprise, producer of knitting and craft yarns

Lion Brand Yarn
- Type: Private
- Headquarters: Carlstadt, New Jersey, USA
- Key people: David Blumenthal, Adam Blumenthal
- Products: Yarn
- Website: Official website

Lion Brand Yarns, also known as Lion Brand Yarn Company and Lion Brand Yarn, was founded in 1878 in the United States. It is the oldest producer of knitting and craft yarn in the United States, and also publishes several knitting and crochet newsletters.

== Naming ==
On its website, the company refers to itself by the names Lion Brand Yarn Company and Lion Brand Yarns, with the copyright notice on each page showing "Lion Brand Yarn". Their first national advertisement, in 1903, advertises as "Lion Brand Yarns".

== History ==
Lion Brand yarns have been on the market since 1878, making it the oldest producer of Yarn in the US.

Current President/CEO Adam Blumenthal's great great-grandfather Reuben founded this fifth-generation, family-owned company.

The company was founded in 1878 by a group of notions and dry goods salesmen that included current CEO Adam Blumenthal’s great great-grandfather, Reuben. During the 1930s under the leadership of Isidor, Lion Brand imported yarns from Europe, supplementing production rather than manufacturing yarns in the U.S.

Joseph Blumenthal, Reuben’s son-in-law, had three sons who ran the company from the 1930s through the early 1990s. Isidor Blumenthal (born 1909, died 2003) served as president of the company from 1958 to his death in 2003. George Blumenthal was in charge of sales and started selling in 1944. Bernard Blumenthal oversaw logistics and distribution.

The fourth generation includes Isidor’s son, David, currently Chairman of the Board of Directors, who began working for Lion Brand in 1969. In the following years, Alan, Bernard's son, and Dean and Jack, George's sons, joined the company. Presently there are two members of the fifth generation Blumenthals working at Lion Brand: David's son Adam (current CEO) and Alan's son Dave.

As of 2005 the company was privately held, and had estimated sales of US$100 million per year.

== Vanna White ==
In 1992 Johnny Carson interviewed Vanna White on The Tonight Show where she disclosed that her favorite hobby was crocheting. David Blumenthal's cousin Jack heard the interview on TV, which resulted in David sending White a package of Lion Brand Yarn. White then began working as a spokesperson for Lion Brand, and that relationship continues today. Lion Brand carries a variety of yarn called "Vanna's Choice". Additional yarns in White's line include "Vanna's Glamour", "Vanna's Sequins" and "Vanna's Choice Baby."

A portion of the proceeds from sales of these yarns are donated to St. Jude Children's Research Hospital. On the June 10, 2013 broadcast of Wheel of Fortune, the program showcased White presenting a check on behalf of Lion Brand for $1,000,000.00 to St. Jude's. Game show host Pat Sajak noted that St. Jude's life saving mission is a "great cause" and a "great charity." On October 19, 2018, David and Shira Blumenthal joined Vanna White on a visit to present St. Jude Children's Research Hospital with a $2 million check, representing the cumulative donation from the sale of Vanna’s signature yarns.

== Ernst & Young Entrepreneur Of The Year Award ==
In June 2013, it was announced that Lion Brand Yarn’s President/CEO, David Blumenthal and EVP/COO, Dean Blumenthal were awarded Ernst & Young Entrepreneur Of The Year Award for their entrepreneurial excellence in the ‘Family Business’ category.

== Publishing ==
The company publishes several knitting and crochet newsletters.

Lion Brand has published several books featuring patterns using their yarn. The company has partnered with several publishers to provide patterns using their products. Some of these include: Knit.1 Magazine published by Vogue Knitting, Clarkson Potter which is part of Crown Publishing Group, Leisure Arts and Random House.

== Website ==
In 2006, Lion Brand won a Webby Award in the Corporate Communications category and its podcast, titled "YarnCraft," has won several awards including PR News' best podcast/videocast award in 2008.

== Free Patterns ==
Lion Brand offers over 8,000 free knitting, crochet and craft patterns.

== Yarn ==
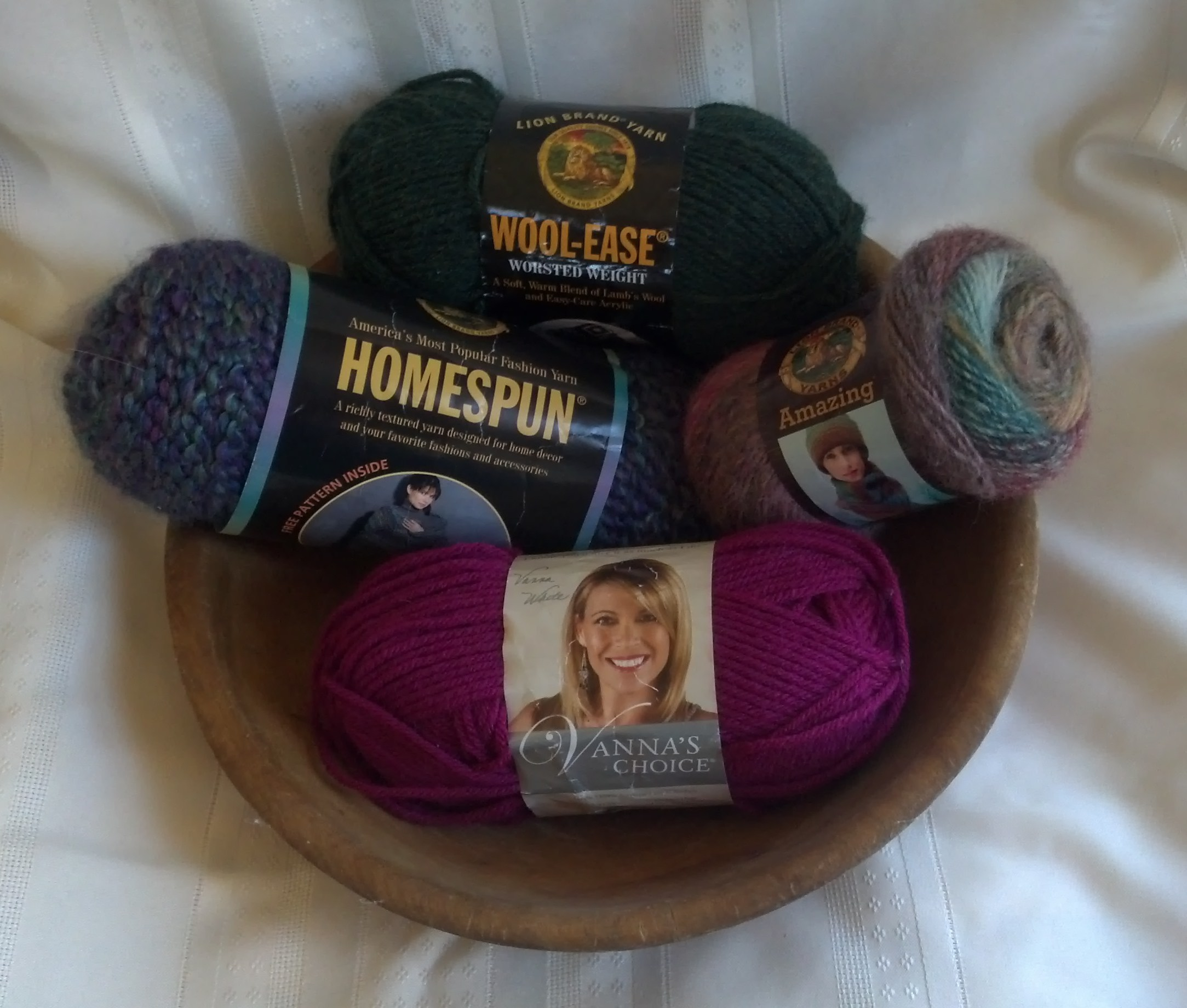
Popular varieties of yarns

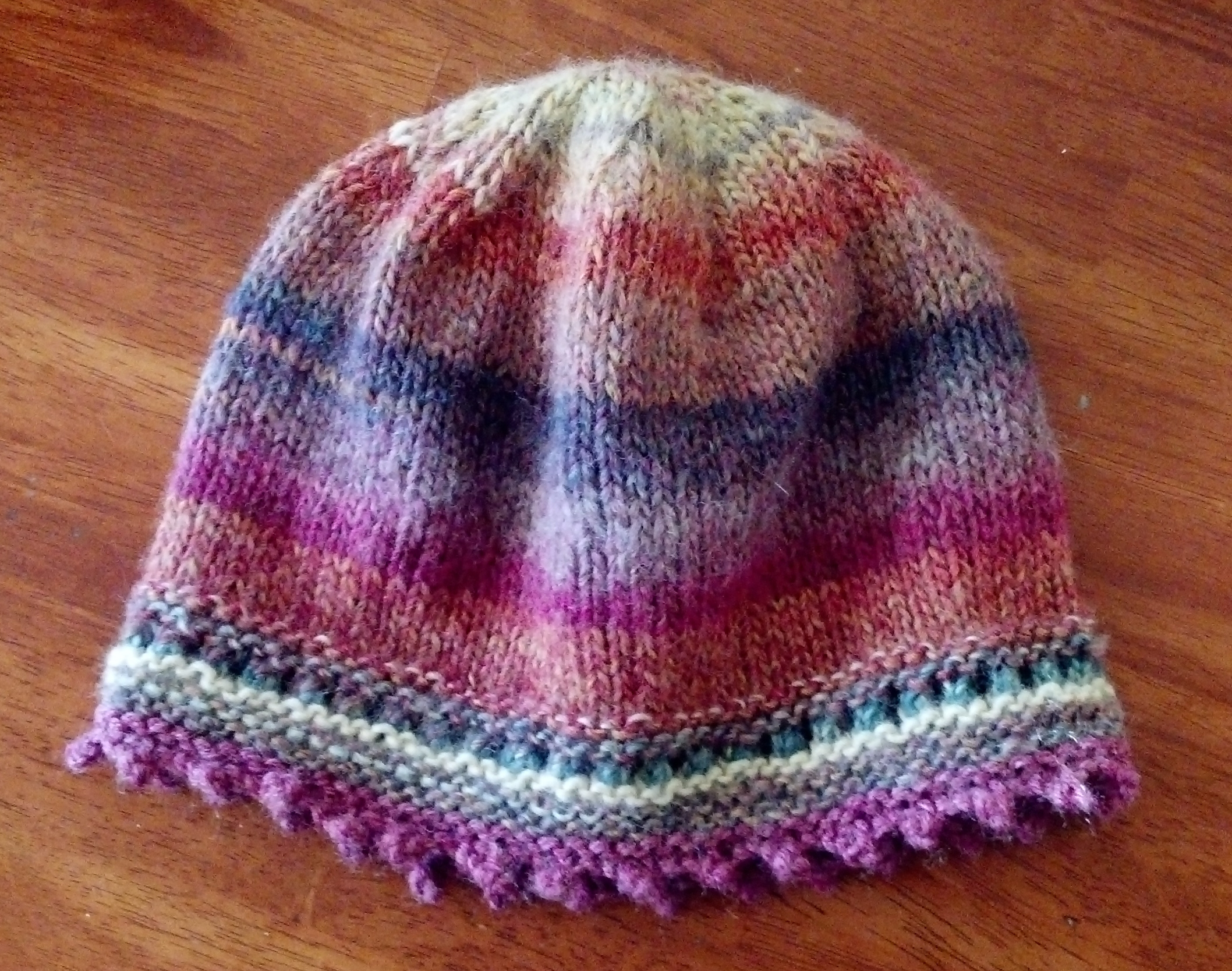
Beanie made from Lion Brand yarns

The company sells a variety of yarns, from 100% natural fibers including cotton, cashmere, alpaca, wool, bamboo, linen, and yak; to blends; and 100% acrylics in a variety of weights. Lion Brand also uses many other semi-synthetic fibers in their yarns such as amicor, lyocell, polyamide, polyester, rayon, modal, tencel, and viscose, to fully synthetic fibers like nylon and polyester. Lion Brand sells seven yarn weights, which are 1: Superfine/Fingering; 2: Fine/Sport; 3: Light/DK; 4: Medium/Worsted; 5: Bulky/Chunky; 6: Super Bulky; and 7: Jumbo. Some of their most popular yarns are Homespun, Fun Fur, Vanna's Choice, and Wool-Ease. Currently, Lion Brand has many collections available, such as the LB Collection®, Wool-Ease ®, Homespun®, Mandala®, Feels Like Butta®, Scarfie®, DIY Glow™, Landscapes®, Cover Story™, Thick & Quick®, Ice Cream®, BonBons®, and Go For Faux®. The company came out with organic cotton yarn in 2007. On June 20, 2023, Lion Brand acquired Quince & Co, a Maine-based premium hand knitting yarn company.

== Studio ==
The Lion Brand Yarn Studio was a retail store located at 34 West 15th Street in Manhattan, which opened in 2008. It sold yarn, provided knitting and crochet classes, and offered custom knitting and crochet services. The Studio closed in March 2020.

== Outlet ==
There is a retail outlet store located in Carlstadt, New Jersey, which opened in 2011. The outlet sells a complete selection of Lion Brand yarns and discontinued yarns, and provides a lounge for customers to knit & crochet. As of March 13, 2022, the retail store had closed.
