= Brian Valentine =

American software executive (born 1959)

- Born: November 28, 1959 (age 66); Centralia, Washington, USA
- Education: Centralia Community College, University of Washington, Eastern Washington University
- Occupation: Software executive
- Employer(s): Intel, Microsoft; Amazon.com, Ivy Softworks
- Known for: Leading development of Microsoft Exchange; Windows 2000; Windows XP other Microsoft products

Henry Brian Valentine (born November 28, 1959) is an American software executive and casual poker player. He has held positions at large companies including Intel, Microsoft and Amazon.com.

== Early life ==
Born in Centralia, Washington, he graduated from high school in 1977 and enrolled in Centralia Community College (CCC). Upon graduating from CCC in 1979 with an associate degree, Valentine then enrolled in the University of Washington's engineering department. Valentine spent one year at UW before taking a leave of absence in 1980.

In the fall of 1981, Valentine enrolled in the Computer Science and Math school at Eastern Washington University (EWU) in Cheney, Washington. In his senior year at EWU, Valentine was selected to develop the software for an automated energy management and control system.

He graduated from EWU with a Bachelor of Science degree in Computer Science in May 1983 and took a job as a software engineer at Intel, working on software for in-circuit emulators, and major systems programming for Unix and VMS applications.

== Microsoft ==
In August 1987, Valentine resigned from Intel and took a position at Microsoft after his former Intel colleague Paul Maritz invited him to join. He spent the next 19 years launching some of the most widely used software products of their time. He led the team that launched Microsoft Exchange Server 4.0, 5.0 and 5.5. As a result of his success with Exchange, he was personally asked by Steve Ballmer in 1998 to rescue the then-failing Windows 2000 project. In one year, Valentine was able to successfully deliver Windows 2000 in December 1999. He then went on to lead the teams responsible for Windows XP, XP SP2, Windows Server 2003 and Windows Vista.

== Amazon ==
In 2006, Valentine moved to join Amazon.com where he built and led the eCommerce Platform team, before leaving in early 2014.

== Post-Amazon ==
Valentine joined Ivy Softworks, an Innovation Studio in Seattle, in September 2014 where he worked until 2015.

== Other ventures ==
Valentine has two final tables at the World Series of Poker Circuit Tour and nine cashes at the World Series of Poker Tour.
