= Charles L. Littel =

American college founder and president

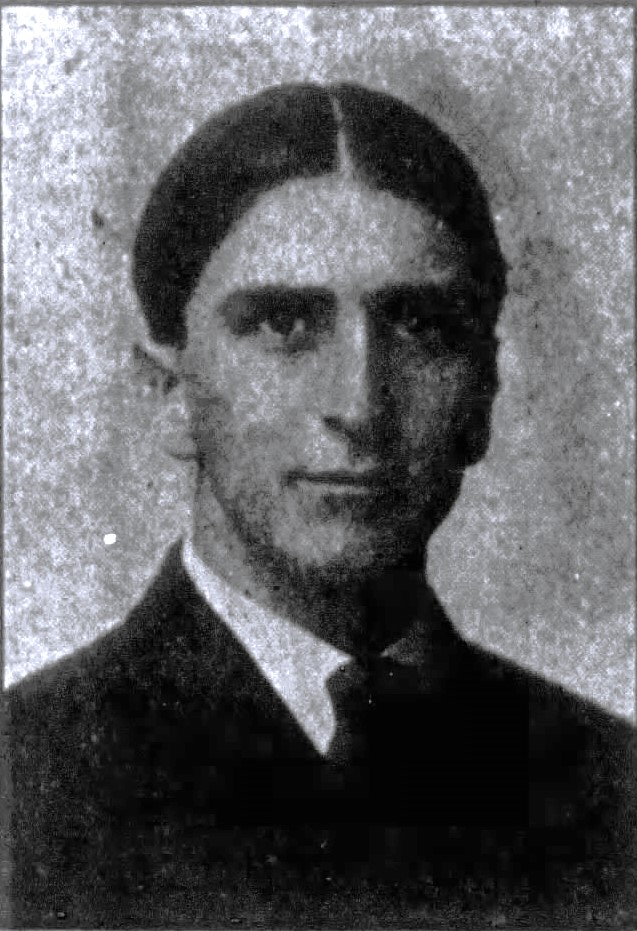
- Charles L Littel, 1909
- Born: c. 1886; Bertrand, Nebraska, US
- Died: March 1, 1966 (aged 79–80); Teaneck, New Jersey, US
- Burial place: George Washington Memorial Park (Paramus, New Jersey)
- Education: University of Nebraska, B.A., 1912 Stanford University, M.A., 1926 New York University, Ed.D., 1936
- Occupations: College administrator and educator
- Known for: Founder and president of Junior College of Bergen County and Centralia Junior College

Charles L. Littel (c. 1886 – March 3, 1966) was an American educator, college founder, and college president. He founded the Junior College of Bergen County in 1933 and served as its president. He was also a founder and president of Centralia Junior College and helped found the Hoquiam Junior College and the Yakima Valley College.

== Early life and education ==
Littel was born in Bertrand, Nebraska around 1886. He graduated from Bertrand High School.

He enrolled in the University of Nebraska but stopped his studies several times for positions as a principal. He returned to the university in 1910 and planned on graduating in December 1911; however, he left school again in the fall semester to pursue an opportunity with the Lincoln Academy. He earned a B.A. from the University of Nebraska in 1912.

He received an M.A. from Stanford University in 1926. In 1936, he received an Ed.D. at New York University.

== Career ==
In 1902, Littel began his career in education, teaching in Indianola, Nebraska. He also taught at McCook High School. Next, he was assistant principal of Dorchester High School. Next, he was the principal of the Roco School.

In 1907, he was elected the County Superintendent of Public Instruction of Hitchcock County, Nebraska, serving in this capacity from January 1908 to January 1910. He ran for a second term in 1909 as a Republican. He was endorsed by The Republican Leader newspaper of Trenton, Nebraska, and the Culbertson Banner in Culbertson, Nebraska, with the latter saying, "Littel...has made the best showing of any superintendent Hitchcock County even had". However, he was not reelected.

In August 1911, Littel became the principal/superintendent and part owner of the Lincoln Academy. In 1915, he became the superintendent of Kenesaw Public Schools in Kenesaw, Nebraska. During his summer vacation, he sold heating and ventilation systems for public buildings. In the fall of 1916, he became the superintendent of schools in Cambridge, Nebraska. In February 1917, the school board gave him a two-year contract for the position, which paid $1,300 the first year and $1,400 the second year. In November 1917, he was appointed to a new three-person state board of control for high school athletics.

He was the superintendent of public schools in Centralia, Washington and head of Centralia Junior College, which he helped found in 1925. He also helped found the Yakima Valley Junior College and the Aberdeen and Hoquiam Junior College which are both in Washington. He was also a founder of the Berkshire Hills School for Girls in Great Barrington, Massachusetts.

He then taught at the University of Washington and at New York University in 1930–31.

In July 1931, he was selected as the principal of Teaneck High School in Teaneck, New Jersey. He served in that position through 1933.

In 1933, he leased property in the Hackensack YMCA and founded the Junior College of Bergen County in September. He served on its board of trustees and was the college's president. He also taught vocational sociology and German. In 1936, he purchased a property for the junior college which later became the Fairleigh Dickinson University Teaneck campus.

He retired in February 1951 and became the president emeritus of what was then Bergen Junior College. Under his leadership, Bergen County Junior College became the largest junior college in New Jersey.

== Personal life ==
Littel was first married to Bernice Warner, who died in 1952. They had one daughter, Estela. He later married Elva Humphrey of Daykin, Nebraska. In 1931, they moved to Teaneck, New Jersey.

He was a member of the Christian Businessmen's Committee of Bergen County, the Hackensack Rotary Club, the Shriners, the Teaneck City Club, the Teaneck Masonic Lodge, and the Trip of the Month Club at the Y.M.C.A. He was a member of the Teaneck Presbyterian Church.

He died on March 3, 1966, in his home in Teaneck at the age of eighty. He was buried in the George Washington Memorial Park in Paramus, New Jersey.
