= John T. Wright =

American politician

John T. Wright (c. 1926 – November 18, 1976) was an American Democratic Party politician and taxi company proprietor. In 1952, he became the first African-American councilmember in predominantly Republican Bergen County, when he was elected to serve on the city council in Englewood, New Jersey.

Born in Dumont, New Jersey, and raised in Englewood, New Jersey, Wright attended Dwight Morrow High School, where as a student athlete he played both basketball and football. After serving in the United States Army, he attended Junior College of Bergen County and Howard University, where he was on the baseball and football teams.
