= Alden Mason (artist) =

American painter

- Born: July 14, 1919; Everett, Washington
- Died: February 6, 2013 (aged 93); Seattle, Washington
- Education: University of Washington
- Known for: Painting

Alden Lee Mason, né Carlson (July 14, 1919 – February 6, 2013) was an American painter from Washington known for creating abstract and figurative artwork. Mason was a professor of art at the University of Washington for over 30 years. His painting are held in a number of public collections including the San Francisco Museum of Modern Art, the Seattle Art Museum, the Portland Art Museum, and the Milwaukee Art Museum.

== Early life and education ==
Mason was born in Everett, Washington, on July 14, 1919. He grew up on a farm on Fir Island in the Skagit Valley. He described his mother as protective and himself as "a small, skinny kid who couldn't see" that only learned he was in need of glasses as a college sophomore. As a young boy, Mason spent most of his time by himself enjoying the outdoors by bird watching, hiking, and exploring. He recalled a formative moment when a sparrow landed on his fingertip, staying for a few seconds to look into his eyes, that pointed him towards becoming an artist.

At age twelve, Mason trapped muskrats to earn money for mail-away cartooning lessons. He stated "I felt guilty trapping all those muskrats, but I loved cartoons, with figures jumping, hopping and smooching. They were having more fun than I was. They lived in a brighter world."

Mason graduated from Mount Vernon High School in 1936. He went on to study entomology at the University of Washington (UW) in Seattle. While he was hitchhiking home from UW, artist Ray Hill gave him a ride back to the Skagit Valley and stopped at Deception Pass for an impromptu watercolor lesson. Mason shifted his focus from science to art following the trip and enrolled in his first art class, studying watercolor painting with Ray Hill. Mason stated "It was really exciting to me; [with my major] I was already interested in the landscape and the things that inhabit the landscape." He earned his Bachelor of Fine Arts from the University of Washington in 1942. Mason received his Master of Fine Arts from UW in 1947.

== Career ==
=== Teaching ===
After graduating from the UW with his MFA, Mason was offered a job teaching at the UW School of Art. Mason continued as a professor at the UW School of Art from 1949 until 1981.

=== Early career and influences, 1938 - 1976 ===
Mason first began serious artistic pursuits when he arrived at the UW in 1938. He found that he had a natural aptitude for watercolor painting. The most attractive properties of watercolor for Mason were the same that made the medium difficult to master: fluidity of paint and permanence of each brush stroke. This artistic medium allowed Mason to improvise, both sketching and painting the final composition. Though his teacher and mentor Hill exemplified how to properly paint landscape, Mason's pursuit of watercolor painting steadily moved away from his own small controlled landscapes to larger, free-style abstractions.

This marked the beginning of his Burpee Garden Series which takes its name from the Burpee Seeds catalog Mason knew from his youth. For Mason, there was a direct correlation between the way the colors of oil paints merged on the canvas and the germination of seeds and growth as they became plants. In 1973 Mason went to New York City with his Burpee Garden Series at the invitation of his longtime friend and past student Chuck Close. At this time Mason became acquainted with Alan Stone, an art dealer in New York who represented his work through the late 1970s. The Greg Kucera gallery later described these works, saying ...

"With their audacious color, surprising scale, and exuberant abstraction, they represent a break with the drably colored or poetic narratives that had typified painting here following the advent of the Northwest School… In the paintings titled the 'Burpee Garden' series Mason produced six by seven foot paintings in a color range not previously seen in the Northwest. Created from 1970 to 1976 this short period produced some of the most influential and groundbreaking works ever made in Seattle."

Work on the scale of the Burpee paintings was not sustainable for the artist. Mason would often start a painting at 9 a.m. and work until at 2 a.m. the next morning to finish the piece. In addition to painting, Mason spent time on large drawings with oil stick and graphite on paper. With these he experimented, washing down his hard edged lines using turpentine. Round-the-clock painting stints left Mason exhausted physically and emotionally. Creating the Burpee series had adverse effects on Mason's health. Poor ventilation with hours spent breathing varnish fumes threatened Mason's lungs and nervous system. He reportedly collapsed on a regular basis and was advised by his doctors to stop using oil based pigments.

In 1976 - 1977, Mason switched to less-toxic acrylics as the medium for his paintings. To develop his ideas, he spent time working on large paper pieces in search of his voice with this new medium. For works on paper from this period, Mason used a chopstick to drag acrylic paint across the surface and painted with thin, gestural washes on paper that was first painted black.

=== Mid-career and influences, 1977 – 1990s ===
By the 1970s, Mason had abandoned white backgrounds and began painting black over the entire canvas or sheet of paper, before creating the imagery of his painting. This process enhanced the brilliant acrylic colors he was using. The artist began chopstick drawings on black grounds and followed with drawings of softer colors during the Squeeze Bottle period.

While Mason devoted energy to producing drawings, he went to friend Robert Sperry's pottery studio and was given a squeeze bottle to decorate a pot for his mother. "We used this squeeze bottle thing…I liked it because it would go fast and would move with this energy... I gradually became more obsessed with it and more obsessed and then gradually covered the whole surface. So it changed from a drawing into a painting. The drawing part was there but it disappeared into this sort of all-over pattern, kind of textile-like look, I suppose…"

By the mid-1980s, Mason was exclusively painting with squeeze bottles, where he combined drawing with paintings for the Squeeze Bottle series. At this time, his travels to Mexico and Central America influenced the iconography of his images with either patch worked blocks of design like a mola, or overall patterns like Mexican rugs. They also incorporated figures from his drawings, animals or portraits of his friends and family.

During the Squeeze Bottle period, Mason was commissioned by the State of Washington to paint two murals for the Senate Chambers in Olympia, Washington.

Following the Squeeze Bottle series Mason created a series of Big Heads in the late 1980s. His depictions of large human heads were filled with walking fish, bugs, flowers, and birds; reflecting his interest in entomology and world travels to New Guinea and Australia. Mason said of this work "I find the interior of a human head, metaphysically speaking a fascinating subject."

=== Late-career 1990s – 2013 ===
In the 1990s, Mason branched out from Big Heads and began to depict the full body, where his figures appear to dance. The sketchy black outline of each character gives the feeling that they are jiving to Mason's symphony of texture and color. Experimenting with acrylic paint application, Mason took the raised line of the Squeeze Bottle pieces, his drawings, Big Heads, and a chop stick; and combined them resulting in a less precise line. Mason sketched with the chopstick on canvas, smudging the black or white line and adding splashes of vibrant color; he then filled in the backgrounds with a monochromatic palette on a scale averaging 60" x 50". Figure focused work occupied Mason during his later career. His studio was filled with "bird watching books, some tribal carvings from halfway around the globe, and a couple of framed carcasses of six inch long bugs." For Mason, each painting told a story of his travels friends, family, or of the lore of his home region the Pacific Northwest.

The free-formed garish figures and spirit birds of Mason's earlier works made their transition to contemporary pieces; depicted in a new medium. His later artworks were composed on a foundation of watercolor in the style of Burpees. The watercolor was visible through an application of thick oil stick and India ink that formed windows in the shape of big heads. Mason's last work covered the entire paper with design. "Each new painting promises to better translate his observations into a painterly language…I am [continually] reminded that his lack of complacency keeps him vital."

Mason died on February 6, 2013, in Seattle, Washington at the age of 93. He was remembered by the Seattle Times as, "a vivid splash of color in the Northwest art world."

== Travel ==
Mason was known to travel internationally to experience exotic flora and fauna. He stated that he was keen on the tropics "because there are hundreds of kinds of birds, beautiful tropical birds of all kinds from parrots to parakeets to toucans."

Travels to South and Central America translated directly into his large Squeeze Bottle paintings of 1978–1980s. Stylized South American mola and brilliantly colored Huichol Indian yarn paintings from Mexico were later reinterpreted in paint.

One of the most influential trips of Mason's career happened in 1989 when he took a trip to Papua New Guinea to spend six weeks with the Huli tribe at the age of 70. There he heard stories from the tribesmen late into the night. A particular memory from this trip was of a spirit bird (which would forever be painted as a blackbird lingering in background) that called to the Hulis and told them to quit telling Mason tribal secrets. When traveling, Mason took an interest in bird watching and indigenous cultures, with his personal experiences impacting his art in both style and content. In the 1990s Mason created painting of spirit birds, body design, and the rhythm of tribal dances.

== Collections and public works ==
Mason's paintings are held in the collections of the Henry Art Gallery, Seattle Art Museum, Tacoma Art Museum, Museum of Northwest Art, San Francisco Museum of Modern Art, Portland Art Museum, Milwaukee Art Museum, and many private and corporate collections in the US.

=== State of Washington murals ===
Mason was commissioned by the State of Washington to paint two murals for the Washington Senate Chambers in the state capitol of Olympia. Painted in 1981, Mason's murals, described as "brightly colored mosaics depicting nature scenes" were 44 feet in length. The murals were designed to fill the lunettes within the Senate Chamber.

The state of Washington sought to remove or relocate Mason's murals from the Senate chamber in 1987, when the Senate was renovated. Commissioned during the same time period for the Washington State House chambers, murals from artist Michael Spafford titled The Twelve Labors of Hercules were covered over within three months of being hung and threatened with removal, following calls for censorship from senators. While Mason's landscapes did not generate moral outrage, the interior decorator "insisted that the murals were inappropriate for the building because they clashed with the mauve-grey-color scheme."

A Mural Defense Fund was formed and a legal battle ensued with the artist's lawyers arguing that the murals could not be relocated as they were site-specific works of art. The judge reluctantly voted in favor of the state. Mason's murals were removed and placed in storage in 1987. His works were eventually installed at Centralia College in the college library in the early 1990s.

== Milestones and honors ==
=== Selected awards ===
- 2005 Northwest Legacy: Visual Arts, Mayor's Arts Award, Seattle, WA
- 1992 WESTAF/NEA Regional Fellowship for Visual Artists for distinguished achievement in painting
- 1988 King County Honors Commission Award

=== Mayor's Art Award ===
In 2005 Mason received the Mayor's Arts Award from the City of Seattle and Mayor Greg Nickels. The award ceremony was held on September 2, 2005, and other recipients included David Brewster, Pat Wright, Peter Donnelly and Sara Liberty Laylin. Mason received the Northwest Legacy: Visual Arts award for his work as a Northwest painter. The honor was received for living in the region his whole life; going on to be educated and to teach at the University of Washington for over 30 years; and making his work in the City of Seattle for over 40 years.

=== Selected public commissions ===
- 2005 6th Ave NW Pocket Park—entry columns and sidewalk pavers created in collaboration with Stephen McClelland
- 1988 Lunar Promenade, 5' x 18', Washington State Convention Center, Seattle, WA
- 1987 McGraw Hall Opera House, Four Murals 4' x 13' each, Seattle, WA (formerly Seattle City Light Promenade)
- 1982 Yellow Birds, 3' x 11.5', Renton District Court, Renton, WA
  - Portland Rose, 6' x 9', Portland Justice Center, Portland, OR
  - Big Chief Seattle, 5' x 24', Sheraton Hotel, Seattle, WA
- 1981 Two Murals in Washington State Senate Chambers, 12' x 44', Olympia, WA
