= The Twelve Labors of Hercules (Spafford) =

Series of murals by Michael Spafford

- Artist: Michael Spafford
- Year: 1981
- Subject: Labors of Hercules
- Location: Centralia, Washington, U.S.
- Owner: Centralia College

The Twelve Labors of Hercules is a series of murals by Washington State artist Michael Spafford commissioned in the early 1980s for the State of Washington. The works were completed in 1981 and meant to be permanently installed on the walls of the House of Representatives' chambers at the Washington State Capitol in Olympia; the building was designed in the 1920s to accommodate murals, but they were not funded until the 1970s. The "stark, black-and-white, modernistic" paintings depict "the mythic tasks performed by the Greek hero Hercules".

The state legislature had approved the spending of $200,000 for murals in the House (to be done by Spafford) and in the Senate (to be done by Alden Mason). Spafford's announced theme drew mixed reactions in March 1981, even before the work started, with Representative John L. O'Brien, who led the funding effort, commenting "It really wasn't what I had in mind," and Senator Albert Bauer commenting "I'd rather see cowboys and Indians." At the first viewing by the legislators on November 9, 1981, during a special session, an AP writer noted that "A majority didn't like what they saw."

The murals were covered by the state government a few weeks after their initial installation by plywood sheets behind a curtain pending their removal after a vote in the House on March 7, 1982, in a rare Sunday session.

A reporter noted that "The 98 House members didn't profess to have the definitive answer to the question 'What is art,' but each had an opinion on the work— almost all negative. The murals have been called obscene, inappropriate, sloppy and obscure." Representative Dick Bond, who had sponsored the resolution to either cover up or take down the mural, called the mural "dirty black and white pictures on the walls," and added "We want and deserve something a lot better than we got." Rep. Mike Patrick, a Seattle policeman and former vice officer, said that the three tests of pornography (lack of redeeming social value, appealing to prurient interest and an affront to community standards) were all met by the work and commented "These murals are in very poor taste for this chamber," and Rep. Irv Greengo said "They don't say anything to the vast majority of people. They shock and disgust.". The murals were separated from the House chamber walls in 1993 and put in storage. The dispute between the state legislature and the artist, becoming a lawsuit for breach of contract against the state, gained note in art and legal journals, and law reference books; the Columbia Law School's Journal of Law & the Arts called it "striking example of suppression of artistic freedom". The Seattle Art Museum said the question of Spafford's artistic freedom became "a state-wide debate".

The murals were eventually acquired by Centralia College in 2002 following a decade of negotiations with the artist, and installed in the college's Corbet Theatre. They were put on display in October 2003 following a symposium about on their history. The history of the Spafford murals and another set by Alden Mason removed from the capitol in 1987, is documented in From Capitol to Campus: The Alden Mason and Michael Spafford Murals.

== Description of the murals and their history ==
Spafford won the commission for four murals to be installed in the Washington State Legislature's House chambers in the Capitol Building in Olympia. Spafford selected the twelve labors of Hercules as the theme, which he felt was an appropriate trope "for the conflicts and Challenges of lawmaking." Spafford "couldn't see any reason why it would be considered inappropriate." The twelve labors were to be depicted on two half circular murals facing each other across the legislative chambers. A third mural would be a large Chimera, breathing fire, on the rear wall facing the speaker of the house. A version of Icarus, providing a theme of hubris, would be above and behind the speaker's podium. The initial proposal was selected by a jury including architects, arts educators and art patrons from a very competitive proposal process. Spafford described the The Twelve Labors of Hercules involved illustrated a critique of the legislative process. Spafford was awarded the commission in September 1980 along with a set of two murals by another University of Washington professor, Alden Mason (1919-2013) for the Senate chambers.

Both artists displayed drawings and specific plans for their proposals during a reception in Olympia. No legislators attended. Spafford's set of two Hercules labors murals with six labors on each wall were installed in the House chambers in July 1981. After months of debate, the Washington State House voted to drape the murals, completely covering them up and cancelling the remaining two panels.

Later a judge awarded Spafford $35,000 for the cancelled murals. The murals were uncovered in 1989, then in 1993 four years later removed entirely and stored, at a cost of $162,200 to Washington State taxpayers—almost double what Spafford was awarded initially to create them.

The mural battle eventually lasted for years, including numerous hearings, media coverage, a lawsuit, and taxpayer expense becoming a Pacific Northwest legend of bureaucratic folly. Interestingly, Alden Mason's murals for the Senate had also been removed because "they were too abstract for their setting." Thus the Washington State legislature spent close to an estimated half million tax dollars for blank walls.

Both the Spafford and Mason completed murals were eventually recovered from storage and installed at the Centralia College in Centralia, Washington, the college installing the Mason murals in its main library in 1991. In 1993 Spafford's Hercules murals were installed in Centralia College's Corbet Theatre, the college's new performing arts center. Spafford refused to attend the unveiling ceremony, stating that he would rather see the site-specific work destroyed than displayed. Don Frey, Centralia College spokesman, defended the public's right to see the "irreplaceable pieces of art."
