= Eleanor Young Love =

American librarian (1922–2006)

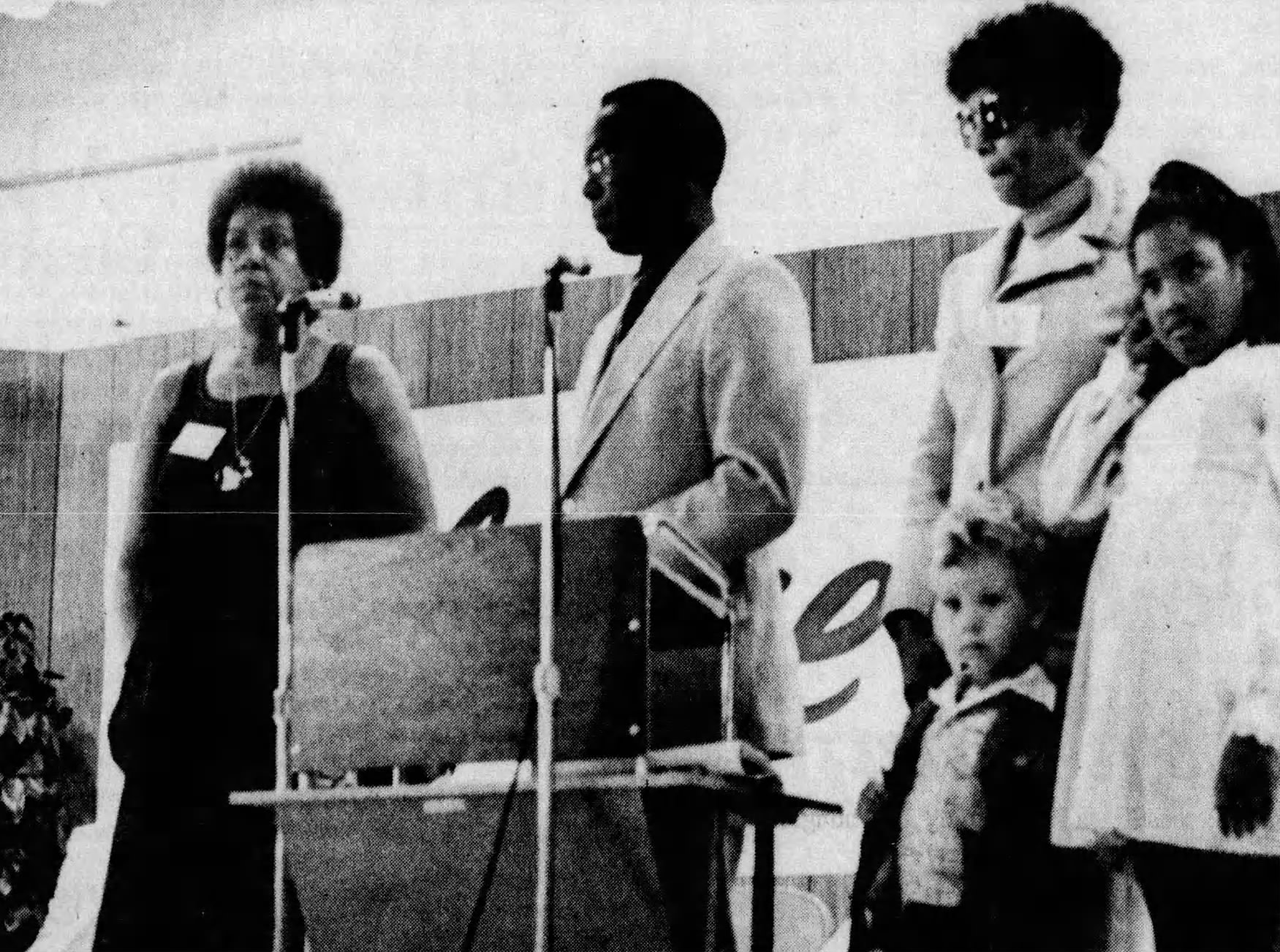
- Eleanor Young Love (standing right) in August 1976
- Born: Eleanor Young; October 10, 1922; Shelby County, Kentucky, U.S.
- Died: July 14, 2006 (aged 83); Kentucky
- Relatives: Whitney Young Jr. (sister)

Eleanor Young Love (October 10, 1922 – July 14, 2006) was an American librarian from Kentucky. The daughter of Whitney Young and the sister of Whitney Young Jr., she worked at the Lincoln Institute, a boarding high school for African American students founded in Lincoln Ridge, Kentucky, during the period when Jim Crow laws were enforced. Her father was its president. She received her degree from Atlanta University, now Clark Atlanta University, her M.Ed. from the University of Louisville, and her D.Ed. from the University of Illinois.

== Early life and education ==
Eleanor Young was born in Shelby County, Kentucky, on October 10, 1922; her parents were Whitney Young and Laura (Ray) Young. Her siblings were Whitney Young Jr. and Arnita Young. Young's mother was one of the first female African American postmasters general in the United States. Her father was head of the Lincoln Institute. Since all faculty lived on the school grounds, Young was born and raised there. Because Kentucky was segregated at the time and many of its counties did not have high schools for African American students, many of them attended the Lincoln Institute. It was originally funded by an anonymous benefactor, but later became a public school.

Young attended the Lincoln Normal School for primary education, then completed her secondary education at the Lincoln Institute. She also participated extensively in her church and had a strict religious upbringing. After graduation, Young enrolled as an English major at Kentucky State University, where she was active in student organizations. She founded several clubs and created many community service projects, often in leadership roles. While a student, Young worked at the library. Later, she earned a scholarship to Atlanta University in library science, where she obtained a bachelor's degree. She subsequently received a masters of education degree from the University of Louisville and a doctorate at the University of Illinois at Urbana. During her attendance at the latter institution, she worked part-time in Chicago.

== Career and later life ==
Love was a librarian at the Lincoln Institute and Florida A&M University, before becoming head librarian at Bergen Junior College of Fairleigh Dickinson University. In 1955, she became the first African American librarian at the University of Kentucky. She became a professor of educational psychology at the University of Louisville in the 1960s. In 1978, she participated in an oral history interview.

Love also succeeded her father as head of the Lincoln Institute before desegregation resulted in its conversion into the Whitney Young Job Corps Center in the late 1960s. She became dean of the college of arts and sciences at the University of Louisville, the first African-American appointed dean. She received many awards including two Governor's Appreciation Citations, the Urban League's Equality Award, NAACP Worthington Award twice, University of Louisville Minority Affairs award twice, the YMCA Black Achievers award, the Kentucky State University Outstanding Achievers award, was named a Kentucky Colonel by two governors, appointed chairwoman of the Human Relations Commission for Louisville and Jefferson County, and was a mentor to hundreds of young people in her community. She died on July 14, 2006, in Kentucky.

A scholarship for students studying school counseling was named after her at the University of Louisville, as well as a humanitarian award sponsored by the city of Louisville.
