= Carlstadt Public Schools =

School district in Bergen County, New Jersey, US

Address
- 550 Washington Street Carlstadt, Bergen County, New Jersey, 07072; United States
- Coordinates: 40.843197°N 74.095128°W

District information
- Grades: PreK to 8
- Superintendent: Allison Evans
- Business administrator: Tracy Luciani
- Schools: 1

Students and staff
- Enrollment: 523 (as of 2023–24)
- Faculty: 43.5 FTEs
- Student–teacher ratio: 12.0:1

Other information
- District Factor Group: DE
- Website: www.carlstadt.org
| Ind. | Per pupil | District spending | Rank (*) | K-8 average | %± vs. average |
|---|---|---|---|---|---|
| 1A | Total Spending | $20,295 | 49 | $18,891 | 7.4% |
| 1 | Budgetary Cost | 14,733 | 37 | 14,159 | 4.1% |
| 2 | Classroom Instruction | 8,950 | 39 | 8,659 | 3.4% |
| 6 | Support Services | 2,034 | 23 | 2,167 | −6.1% |
| 8 | Administrative Cost | 1,864 | 56 | 1,547 | 20.5% |
| 10 | Operations & Maintenance | 1,824 | 49 | 1,612 | 13.2% |
| 13 | Extracurricular Activities | 47 | 10 | 104 | −54.8% |
| 16 | Median Teacher Salary | 70,482 | 58 | 61,136 |
Data from NJDoE 2014 Taxpayers' Guide to Education Spending. *Of K-8 districts with 401-750 students. Lowest spending=1; Highest=64

The Carlstadt Public Schools is a community public school district that serves students in pre-kindergarten through eighth grade from the Borough of Carlstadt in Bergen County, in the U.S. state of New Jersey.

As of the 2023–24 school year, the district, comprised of one school, had an enrollment of 523 students and 43.5 classroom teachers (on an FTE basis), for a student–teacher ratio of 12.0:1.

For ninth through twelfth grades, public school students attend the Henry P. Becton Regional High School in East Rutherford, which serves high school students from both Carlstadt and East Rutherford as part of the Carlstadt-East Rutherford Regional School District, together with students from Maywood, who attend as part of a sending/receiving relationship. As of the 2023–24 school year, the high school had an enrollment of 821 students and 61.5 classroom teachers (on an FTE basis), for a student–teacher ratio of 13.4:1.

== History ==
A groundbreaking ceremony for a new elementary / middle school was held on June 4, 2005, at the site of the new school, adjacent to the Lindbergh School. With the opening of the new Carlstadt Public School, which now serves all of Carlstadt's K-8 students, the Lincoln and Washington school sites have been turned over to the borough and plans have been developed to convert the sites for senior housing.

The district had been classified by the New Jersey Department of Education as being in District Factor Group "DE", the fifth-highest of eight groupings. District Factor Groups organize districts statewide to allow comparison by common socioeconomic characteristics of the local districts. From lowest socioeconomic status to highest, the categories are A, B, CD, DE, FG, GH, I and J.

== Schools ==
Carlstadt Public School serves students in grades Pre-K to 8 and had an enrollment of 510 students as of the 2023–24 school year (based on enrollment data from the National Center for Education Statistics).

- Kelly Schrobach, principal

== Administration ==
Core members of the district's administration are:

- Allison Evans, superintendent
- Tracy Luciani, business administrator and board secretary

== Board of education ==
The district's board of education, comprised of nine members, sets policy and oversees the fiscal and educational operation of the district through its administration. As a Type II school district, the board's trustees are elected directly by voters to serve three-year terms of office on a staggered basis, with three seats up for election each year held (since 2012) as part of the November general election. The board appoints a superintendent to oversee the district's day-to-day operations and a business administrator to supervise the business functions of the district.
