= Junior College of Bergen County =

College in Bergen County, New Jersey (1933–1953)

- Seal of Junior College of Bergen County
- Other names: Bergen Junior College; Bergen College
- Type: Public
- Active: 1933–1953
- Founder: Charles L. Littel
- President: Charles L. Littel
- Location: Hackensack (1933–1936) and Teaneck (1937–1953), New Jersey, United States
- Merger: Fairleigh Dickinson College (1953)
- Colors: Green and White
- Nickname: Cagers

The Junior College of Bergen County (also known as Bergen Junior College and Bergen College) was an educational institution founded in 1933 in Hackensack, New Jersey; it later moved to Teaneck, New Jersey. It was the first coeducational junior college in New Jersey. In 1953, it merged with Fairleigh Dickinson College.

== History ==
In 1933, the Board of Education of the Englewood Public School District in Englewood, New Jersey, suggested establishing a junior college in Bergen County. The proposed college would provide the first two years of a college education at an affordable and convenient location for local students. However, efforts to establish the college in public school buildings in Englewood, Hackensack, and Ridgewood were not successful.

In July 1933, officials with the Hackensack Y.M.C.A. announced it was going to rent facilities to Charles L. Littel for the junior college. The Y.M.C.A. had four classrooms, a boardroom, a cafeteria, gymnasium, and study spaces that could be used around the Y's schedule. Chairs for students were provided by Littel, the former principal of Teaneck High School, who was also leading the effort to start the junior college.

The college opened on September 13, 1933, and had fifty students. Tuition for the junior college was initially $200 to $250. Cecil K. Lyons was president of the board; Littlel was a member of the board of trustees. Lyons had a M.A. from the University of Oxford and a Ph.D. from Clarke University. He taught contemporary civilizations. Little had a M.A. from Stanford University and was previously the head of Centralia Junior College and had taught at New York University and the University of Washington. He taught vocational sociology and German. All other faculty had Ph.D.s or master's degrees and taught classes in five essential subjects.

In May 1934, the college's library was expanded with a gift from Harriet C. Hunter. The library's collection included classic literature and books on modern science. In 1936, the college moved to its own campus in Teaneck, New Jersey.

The college began to be known as Bergen Junior College in 1937. In November 1941, the alumni, students, and college administration voted to change its name to Bergen College to better reflect its growth. However, the school's legal name remained the same.

In 1951, the college offered day and evening classes. In September 1951, the college expanded its music department in collaboration with the Carnegie School of Music of Englewood.

=== Merger ===
In August 1953, the trustees of the college approached Fairleigh Dickinson College about merging. In late 1953, the college merged with Fairleigh Dickinson College (now Fairleigh Dickinson University). At the time, Bergen had 197 day students and 297 evening students. Walter Head, who was then president of Bergen, became the provost of the Fairleigh Dickinson Bergen campus. Other faculty, support staff, and administrative staff retained their positions with the merger.

== Academics ==
When it opened, the college offered classes in American history, biology, botany, chemistry, contemporary civilizations, English, French, German, Latin, mathematics, occupational sociology, physical education, physics, psychology, and sociology. In 1941, the college awarded A.B. and B.S. degrees and also provided instruction in accounting, commercial, engineering, and secretarial. In September 1951, the college expanded its music department in collaboration with the Carnegie School of Music of Englewood.

== Student life ==
The college's yearbook was the Saga. It also has a student newspaper. There was a student council, a drama club, a glee club, and ten academic clubs. The students established several local fraternities and sororities, coordinated by an Panhellenic Council. There was also a chapter of Delta Psi Omega, a national honorary dramatic fraternity.

== Athletics ==
The college's athletic teams were originally called the Cagers but were later known as the Indians. Its colors were green and white. It had a football, track, and men's and women's basketball teams that competed with other junior colleges. It became the first White college to play a Black college, playing Wilberforce State College (now Central State University) in 1948. It claimed the 1949 national junior college football championship.

== Notable people ==
=== Alumni ===
- John T. Wright (c. 1926–1976), politician who became the first African-American councilmember in Bergen County, when he was elected in 1952 to serve on the Englewood city council

=== Faculty ===
- Wenonah Bell (1890–1981), painter
- Helen Jepson (1904–1997), lyric soprano
- Eleanor Young Love (1922–2006), librarian

=== Presidents ===
- Charles L. Littel, founder of several colleges

== See also ==
- List of colleges and universities in New Jersey
