= Michael Spafford =

American artist (1935–2022)

- Born: November 6, 1935; Palm Springs, California, U.S.
- Died: January 29, 2022 (aged 86)
- Education: Pomona College
- Alma mater: Harvard University
- Known for: oil painting
- Website: michaelspafford.com

Michael Charles Spafford (November 6, 1935 – January 29, 2022) was an American artist known for his archetypal, figurative oil paintings drawn from Classical mythology. Spafford taught painting at the University of Washington, Seattle until his retirement in 1994.

== Early life and education ==
Spafford was born in Palm Springs, California, on November 6, 1935. He was the middle of three sons of Sarah Alice Maloney and Lynn Spafford, a businessman, and grew up in Greater Los Angeles. Spafford became interested in the Classical myths in his Latin class at Riverside High School, one of his first artworks being a drawing of the Roman underworld based on Ovid's Metamorphoses.

Spafford was also interested in cartooning and was able to obtain a part-time job with an advertising agency in Riverside, California while still in high school. After graduating in 1953, he attended Riverside Junior College and then transferred to Pomona College.

While at Pomona in 1956, Spafford met Elizabeth Sandvig, who eventually became his wife. Spafford graduated from Pomona magna cum laude and Phi Beta Kappa. Spafford and Sandvig moved to Cambridge, Massachusetts, where Spafford had a full scholarship in art history at Harvard University and Sandvig pursued a teaching certificate in art at Radcliffe College.

After a year at Harvard, Spafford decided to pursue his interests in making art rather than studying art history and the couple moved to Mexico City to join Sandvig's mother.

== Career ==
=== Mexico City ===
After graduating from Pomona University and studying art history for a year at Harvard, Spafford moved to Mexico City where his mother-in-law lived so that he and Sandvig could live and focus on their art. Here, Spafford was able to study the Mexican mural painters first-hand and was influenced by their portrayals of mythic subjects depicting powerful, often brutal imagery, their graphic, simplified forms and solid colors. Spafford adopted his approach of taking a mythic subject, usually of Greco-Roman origin, and working out multiple versions with strikingly graphic contrasts. He would work on the same myth over a period of years.

In 1962, Spafford and Sandvig had solo exhibitions in Mexico City at the Mexican-North American Cultural Institute. Spafford's portrayal of death was noted as well as his "ruthless, hopeless, seared constructions of our time."

After the birth of their son in 1963, Spafford accepted a teaching position with the University of Washington School of Art in Seattle, Washington. Two years later, Sandvig's mother joined them in 1965.

=== Seattle ===
In Seattle, Spafford earned prizes in both painting and drawing at the 1964 annual Pacific Northwest Arts and Crafts Fair, where the judge was George B. Culler, director of the San Francisco Museum of Art. The novelist, Tom Robbins, then writing for The Seattle Times newspaper, noted that Culler had no trouble awarding first prize to Spafford and that Spafford was "one of the few University of Washington professors to display any originality in the annual faculty show" the previous winter.

Spafford followed this with a solo show at the Otto Seligman Gallery in 1965. Spafford was awarded a Louis Comfort Tiffany Foundation grant in 1966.

In 1967, at the same annual fair, Spafford's Rape of Europa was ordered to be taken down by the developer who managed the fair's venue.

=== The Prix de Rome and Italy ===
In 1967, Spafford won the Prix de Rome fellowship, which included a studio at the American Academy in Rome. In Italy, Spafford began to work larger and adopted key themes from the Roman myths that would inform his work for most of his career, including the myths of Leda and the swan, the twelve labors of Hercules, the fall of Icarus, and the myths around the fall of the Titans and Saturn. Spafford would later point out that living in a foreign culture helped him learn how to see. He also began using diptych and triptych configurations while in Rome.

=== Public art ===
Spafford and Sandvig became active in efforts to increase public funding of the arts upon their return to Seattle in 1969. A member of The Artist's Group (TAG), and its president in 1974, Spafford and the group and its allies successfully lobbied for one-percent-for-art legislation that would require one percent of the construction budget of public buildings to be spent on the acquisition and maintenance of art for those buildings. Spafford argued that art is not a decorative frill, but should be considered an essential part of a public building and its design. He argued that to do otherwise "is a crime against the people". In 1973, Seattle and King County adopted one-percent ordinances. The state of Washington followed in 1974. By 1975, the Seattle Arts Commission had purchased art from 31 Northwest artists under the one-percent ordinance.

Spafford's 1980 commission for murals based on the twelve labors of Hercules for the Washington state legislature chambers led to his murals first being covered, then uncovered in 1989, before being removed entirely in 1993 and stored. The murals were eventually installed at the Centralia College Corbet Theatre in 2002 after a decade of negotiations.

Spafford's first public art commission was the 1978 King County Arts Commission installation of five images based on the Fall of Icarus (Tumbling Figure – Five Stages) on the external wall of an elevator shaft of Seattle's Kingdome. The design was executed in 1978, then Spafford took a one-year sabbatical to Mexico. Fabrication and installation were completed after Spafford returned from Mexico in 1979. The Kingdome was demolished in 2000 and Spafford's work was put into storage. In 2004, Tumbling Figure – Five Stages was re-installed on a parking garage facade at 6th avenue and Jefferson Street in Seattle.

In 1985, Spafford accepted a commission for the Seattle Opera House, producing a thirteen panel Thirteen Ways of Looking at a Blackbird, after Wallace Stevens' poem. This time, the work was positively received by both art critics and public.

=== Later career ===
Returning from Mexico City in 1969, Spafford resumed his faculty position in the University of Washington, Seattle School of Art, teaching drawing and painting until his retirement in 1993.

A large diptych of the Labors of Hercules (1977) was purchased by the Seattle Art Museum (SAM) which led to a retrospective of Spafford's paintings at the Seattle Art Museum in February and March 1982. The labors of Hercules would be a motif Spafford worked on for much of his career, creating over 60 works on the theme, including a 1987 set of woodblock prints which was the first art acquired by the Microsoft Art Collection. Another motif used frequently throughout his career that is represented in Spafford's Seattle Art Museum retrospective of 1982 is Leda and the Swan.

In 1983, The American Academy and Institute of Arts and Letters awarded Spafford a $5,000 prize in the visual arts and included his paintings and graphic work in an academy exhibit in New York City the same year.

Spafford had a large solo exhibition at the Seattle Art Museum in 1986, and another retrospective was held at the Bellevue Art Museum in 1991. The Bellevue Art Museum exhibited the Rape of Europa piece that had been taken down from the Bellevue Arts and Crafts Fair show 24 years earlier. In 2018, Spafford's larger epic works, many of which had not been previously exhibited, and series of woodcut prints were exhibited in a three part exhibition involving three Seattle galleries: the Greg Kucera Gallery, Woodside/Braseth Gallery, and Davidson Galleries.

== Style and meaning ==
Spafford used images and themes found in classical myths to address the human condition. He frequently returned to the myths of Europa, Leda and the swan, the labors of Hercules, the fall of Icarus, and others. Spafford seeks to distill the primal power of these myths through highly re-worked painting, using both subtractive and additive methods to portray the struggle, both in his paint and in his themes, of human life.

Seattle-based art critic Regina Hackett wrote:

Michael Spafford abbreviates and freely alters the stories that interest him, ignoring the convoluted and decorative. What's left are the primary passions, the excavated pressure points of human consciousness. … Myth is Spafford's catalyst. He doesn't want to shake the history of rape, romance, murder, phallus-worship, the pathological underpinnings of the heroic. In myth, he finds access to the extreme situations that cannot be dismissed as contemporary aberration. He is after the pause before slaughter, the moment of cataclysmic fusion …

== Personal life and death ==
Spafford and his wife, Elizabeth Sandvig, upon receiving his position at the University of Washington in Seattle, moved to the city's Montlake neighborhood.

Michael Spafford died from lung cancer on January 29, 2022, at the age of 86, just days before the opening of a major solo exhibition of his work at the Russo/Lee gallery in Portland, Oregon.

== Awards ==
- 2017 Lifetime Contribution to the Northwest Art Award (with Elizabeth Sandvig), Museum of Northwest Art (NONA), La Conner, Washington
- 2006 Mayor's Art Award, Family of Northwest Artists: Spike Mafford, Elizabeth Sandvig, Michael Spafford, Seattle, Washington
- 2005/2006 Award for Visual Artists, Flintridge Foundation, Pasadena, California
- 1999 Lifetime Achievement in the Arts Award, Corporate Council for the Arts, Seattle, Washington
- 1996 Neddy Artist Award, The Behnke Foundation, Seattle, Washington
- 1987 Centrum Print Commission, Fort Worden, Washington
- 1983 Art Award, American Academy and Institute of Arts and Letters, New York, New York
- 1979 King County Arts Commission's Honors Award, Seattle, Washington
- 1967–1969 Prix de Rome Prize Fellowship, American Academy, Rome, Italy
- 1965–1966 Louis Comfort Tiffany Foundation Grant, New York, New York

== Bibliography ==
- Academic libraries, Centralia College special collections (2009), Michael Spafford Mural, Directory of Washington Libraries (PDF), Washington State Library, 2009, p. 4
- Cassandra Tate (December 14, 2013), Museum of Northwest Art (MONA) biography https://www.monamuseum.org/artist/michael-spafford.
- Faber, Ann (13 January 1965) "Young Painter Offers Astounding Experiment," Seattle Post-Intelligencer, p. 16
- Guenther, Bruce (9 January 1986) exhibit essay, "Michael Spafford," Seattle Art Museum
- Guenther, Bruce (2018) Michael Spafford: Epic Works. preface by Lisa Dutton Spafford, afterword by Michael Spafford, Seattle: Lucia | Marquand publishing, ISBN 978-0-9986817-9-5
- Hackett, Regina (17 April 1991) "Tacoma Art Museum Scores with Exhibit of Teamwork," Seattle Post-Intelligencer, p. C-12
- Hauser, Susan G. (31 July 1987) "Pols vs. Hercules in Olympia," Wall Street Journal, p. 1
- Joysmith, Toby (24 May 1962 ) "Ideas Exchanged, New Values Born in Mexican Art," Mexico City Collegian
- Kammen, Michael (2009). Visual Shock: A History of Art Controversies in American Culture. Knopf Doubleday
- Kangas, Matthew (November 1982) "Michael Spafford at the Seattle Art Museum," Art in America
- Kangas, Matthew (6 January 1987) "The Opera House as Art Museum," The Weekly, pp. 32–32
- Kangas, Matthew (10 March 1987) "The Thinking Person's Northwest Artist," The Weekly, pp. 29–30
- Karlstrom, Paul (4 September 1992) oral history interview with Michael Spafford and Elizabeth Sandvig, Archives of American Art website https://www.aaa.si.edu/collections/interviews/oral-history-interview-michael-spafford-and-elizabeth-sandvig-12402
- Robbins, Tom (26 July 1964) "Panaca Fair Is One of Biggest, Best," The Seattle Times, p. 41
- Spafford, Michael (October 1972) "TAG," Puget Soundings, October 1972, pp. 20, 34-36
