= Centralia College =

Community college in Washington, US

- Former name: Centralia Junior College
- Type: Public community college
- Established: 1925
- Endowment: $7.8 million
- President: Robert Mohrbacher
- Administrative staff: 212
- Students: 4,840 (2024–2025)
- Location: Centralia, Washington, United States; 46.71595°N 122.95944°W
- Nickname: Trailblazers
- Sporting affiliations: Northwest Athletic Conference
- Mascot: Blazer Bill
- Website: www.centralia.edu

Centralia College is a public community college in Centralia, Washington. Although it primarily offers certificates and Associate degrees, it also offers a few Bachelor's degrees. Founded in 1925, Centralia is the oldest continuously operating community college in the state of Washington. The college sits on 29 acres (120,000 m^{2}) in the middle of the town of Centralia. There is a branch education center, Centralia College East, in the town of Morton and the college offers a range of online and correspondence courses. Overall, the college serves an area of 2,409 square miles (6,240 km^{2}) in Lewis County and southern Thurston County under the administrative classification of Community College District Twelve.

== History ==
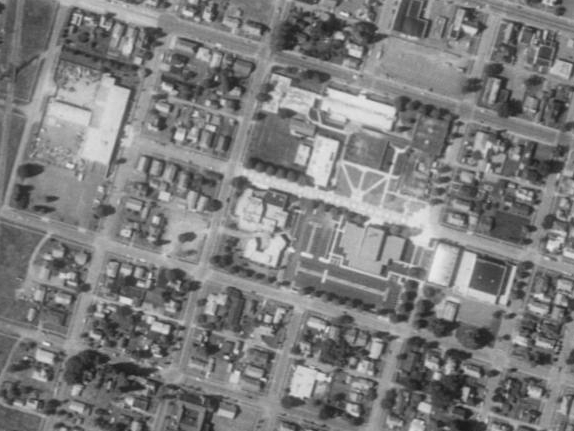
Aerial view of campus

Centralia College opened on September 14, 1925, as the Centralia Junior College as part of an agreement between the University of Washington, Centralia Public Schools, and the Centralia School Board. It was the first junior college to open in the state and preceded the Washington Community and Technical Colleges system. The college received its accreditation from the Northwest Commission on Colleges and Universities in 1948. The first physical campus opened in 1950 with Kemp Hall. Growing from an entrance class of 15 students, as of 2009 the college has an enrollment of 4,803 students in 64 academic programs. The college is affiliated with the private Centralia College Foundation, founded in 1982 by community members, to supplement its public resources.

The college is also home to Michael Spafford's The Twelve Labors of Hercules, a series of murals commissioned in the early 1980s for the House of Representatives' chambers. From 1982 to 1987 they were covered with curtains due to their perceived (by some) sexually suggestive nature and later were placed in storage. Following a decade of negotiations, the college acquired the murals in 2002 for display in the Corbet Theatre. Murals created by Alden Mason and originally displayed at the Capitol were moved to the college library in 1990.

== Academics ==
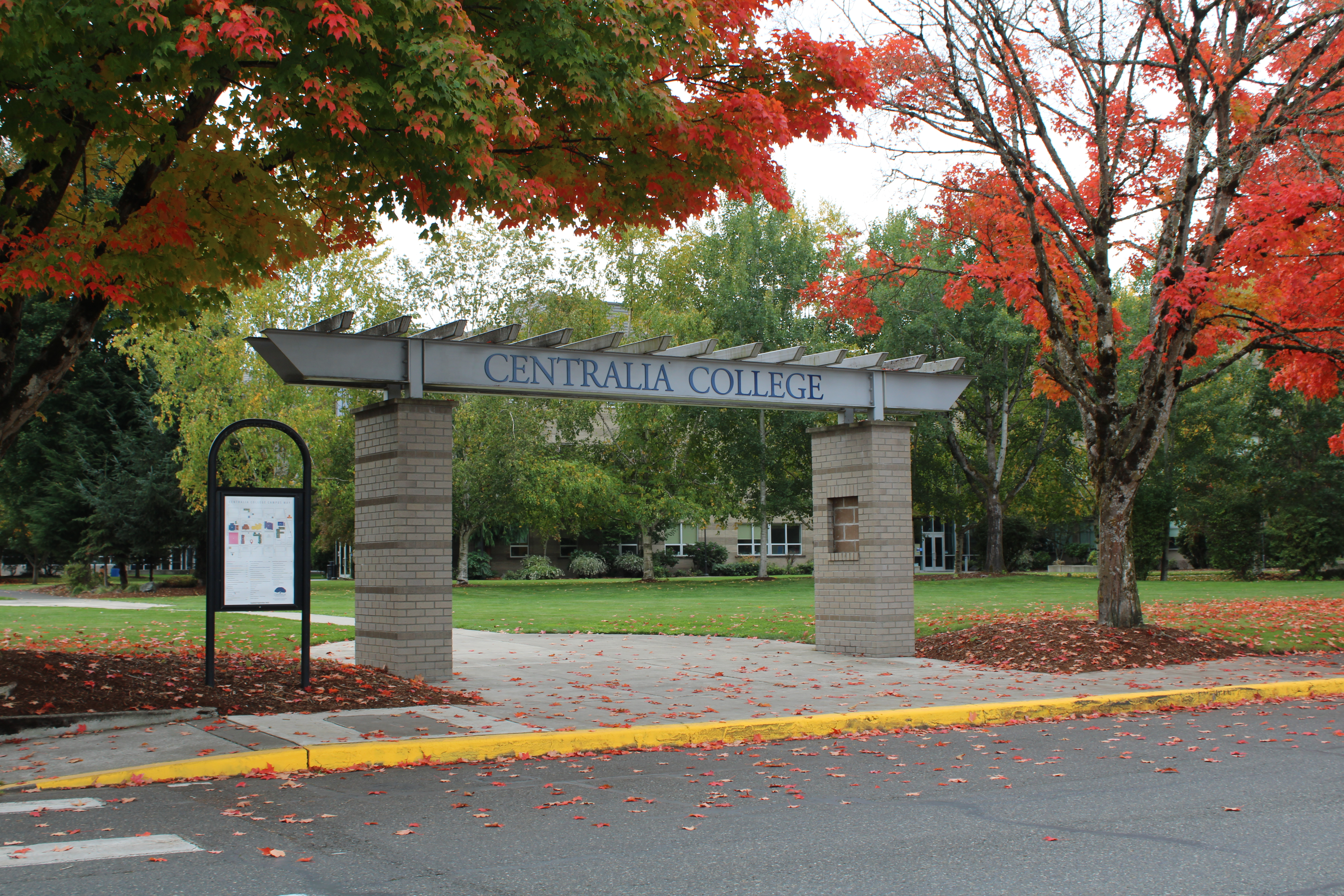
Campus entrance, 2025

In 2012 the college began offering a Bachelor of Applied Science in Applied Management degree. It now offers a Bachelor of Applied Science in Diesel Technology degree and a Bachelor of Applied Science in Information Science and Application Development degree.

=== Enrollment ===
Student enrollment during the 2008–2009 year was recorded at 4,803 students and reached a peak of 8,532 during the 2009–2010 semesters. Registration declined slowly in the ensuing decade, with between 6,000 and 7,000 students listed for the 2019–2020 period. The next school year, during the COVID-19 pandemic, enrollment decreased to around 4,200 students. As of the 2024–2025 school year, 4,840 people were registered students at the college.

The college's 2024–2025 report lists 53% of the student population to be 25 years old or younger, with over 49% being of Latino heritage. Low-income students comprise 49% of the campus's enrollees and approximately 600 high school students are attending classes as part of Running Start. Over 57% re-enrolled from the following school year. The college's three-year completion rate was reported at 37%.

== Campus ==
Centralia College, panorama, 2013

The Centralia College KNOLL, known also as the Kiser Natural Outdoor Learning Lab, was dedicated in 2012. Named in honor of Rufus Kiser, a botany teacher at the college who died in 1995, the natural area and garden site is located along China Creek.

In 2023, the college, in partnership with Collegiate Housing International (CHI), completed an off-campus student apartment complex providing affordable accommodations for students in part due to the ongoing housing crisis. The dormitory complex can house up to 110 students. With an occupancy of 8 people per living quarters, each unit shares a common room and is pre-furnished. The following year, the complex was begun to be used as limited and temporary housing for Centralia high school students who are homeless. The project, named Scholars Haven, enrolls the students into the college's Running Start program.

=== Artworks ===
The campus contains several murals including works by Alden Mason and Robert Calvo. The mural collection, Twelve Labors of Hercules, by the artist William Spafford that was created in the 1980s for the Washington State Capitol but removed due to complaints, resides at the college. A mural in Washington Hall features Merce Cunningham, a dancer and choreographer from Centralia.

=== Centralia College East ===
A satellite campus of Centralia College is located in Morton, Washington. Known originally as Centralia College East County Center, the campus began in 1983 and was originally located in a classroom at Morton High School. A building was constructed for the center and was completed in 1997. Situated next to the high school, the institution relocated in August and was renamed as Centralia College East (CCE). The college partners with the Morton School District to produce a musical every two years. The event began in 1986 and funds raised from the productions provide scholarships for high school students in the city, as well as graduates in Mossyrock and White Pass.

== Athletics ==
The college's mascot is the Trailblazer and the athletics program includes teams for women's volleyball, men's baseball, men's and women's basketball, women's fast pitch softball and women's golf. These teams play in the Northwest Athletic Conference (NWAC).

The college is home to a sports complex known as Bob Peters Field. The site, begun in 1999 through the purchasing of neighborhood lots, was declared completed in 2023 after an official groundbreaking the prior year. The complex was named after the college's athletic director, the longest serving director in Washington state history. The athletic compound is 4.0 acres (1.6 ha) and hosts fields for baseball, softball, and soccer. Student fees of over $3 million were used for the construction of the complex.

=== Extinct facilities ===
The college's Kirk Library was once the site of Noble Field, named after Elmer Noble, a Centralia High School graduate and World War I hero who died in action. The field temporarily contained an observation tower where volunteers, especially high school students, could spot incoming Japanese fighter planes during World War II. The tower was situated on top of the grandstand's press booth which contained a direct phone line to the Fort Lewis Command Center and was outfitted with blackout curtains. The grandstand was removed in 1971.

== Notable alumni and people ==
- Charlie Albright, pianist
- Brandy Clark, Grammy Award-winning musician
- Charles L. Littel, one of the founders of the college who also founded Junior College of Bergen County
- Angela Meade, opera singer
- Patricia Anne Morton, first woman to serve as a Diplomatic Security special agent
- Jimmy Ritchey, country music songwriter and record producer
- Delford M. Smith, aviator and businessman
- Brian Valentine, American software executive
