= Passaic Bus Terminal =

Transit hub in Passaic, New Jersey, USA

Coordinates: 40.86275°N 74.12742°W

The Passaic Bus Terminal, also referred to as Main Avenue Terminal, is a local and regional bus terminal operated by New Jersey Transit (NJT) located on Main Avenue in Passaic, New Jersey in the city's downtown area.

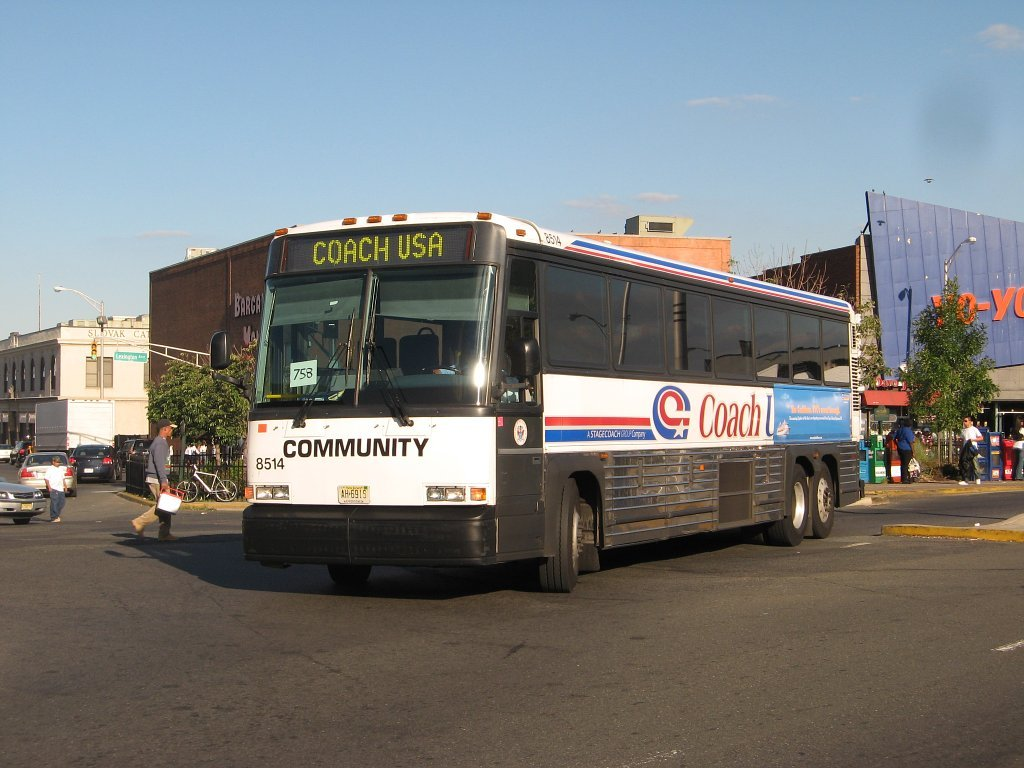
#758 in Downtown Passaic

== Facilities and service ==
Unlike its counterpart in Paterson, there are no actual terminal facilities at Passaic Bus Terminal. Instead, there is one turnoff lane on Main Avenue that must be used by all buses entering and departing from the station. In September 2016 it was announced that the antiquated facilities would be replaced with a new off street terminal, made possible in part with federal funding.

Not all bus routes that serve the terminal use it a termination/origination point. Community Coach, under contract with NJT, operates several routes in Passaic and adjacent Bergen County which run Monday through Saturday service. As of 2016 an average of 2,800 weekday NJT passengers on more than 400 weekday trips used the facility. It was estimated that there was an average of 1300 weekday passengers on approximately 550 weekday jitney trips.

== Passaic bus routes ==
Route	Terminals		Via	Notes
74	Broadway Bus Terminal (Paterson)	Branch Brook Park Station; North Newark	Passaic Main Avenue Terminal; Delawanna Station, Kingsland Avenue, Franklin Avenue or Union Avenue	
190	Broadway Bus Terminal (Paterson)	Port Authority Bus Terminal; Midtown Manhattan	Saint Joseph's Medical Center; Passaic Main Avenue Terminal; Passaic Station; Delawanna Station-Clifton; Union Avenue Bridge; Rutherford Station; Paterson Plank Road; North Hudson- NJ 495-Marginal Highway; Lincoln Tunnel	limited service to Clifton and North Hudson
Paterson-PABT Jitney	Broadway Bus Terminal (Paterson)	Port Authority Bus Terminal; Midtown Manhattan	Paterson Plank Road, Orient Way, Main Avenue, NJ 495-Marginal Highway	roughly parallel to NJT 190
702	Elmwood Park; Boulevard and Broadway	Saint Joseph's Medical Center; Paterson	Marshall Street; Valley Road; Van Houten Avenue; Passaic Avenue; Monroe Street (Passaic and Garfield); Palisade Avenue and Wessington Avenue (certain trips); Randolph or Parker Avenues and Dayton Avenue (certain trips); Shaw Street/Boulevard	* Formerly the P2 route.: Buses marked "via Wessington" stay on Monroe Street through Passaic and into Garfield.; Buses marked "via Botany Village" use either Randolph Avenue (to Elmwood Park) or Parker Avenue (to Paterson).; Shaw Street in Garfield becomes Boulevard near the intersection for US-46 in Elmwood Park.
703	Meadowlands Sports Complex	Haledon(most trips); Broadway Bus Terminal (nights)	Paterson Avenue; Lakeview Avenue; Trenton Avenue; 20 Avenue; West Broadway; Belmont Avenue	Sunday service operates only between the Meadowlands and Paterson.; Service formerly extended into North Haledon along High Mountain Road.; Formerly the P3 line.
705	Passaic Main Avenue Terminal	Willowbrook Mall	Clifton Avenue; Long Hill Road; Main Street	Formerly the P5 route.; Some early morning and mid-afternoon trips terminate at Allwood Road.
707	Paterson City Hall	Westfield Garden State Plaza	Marshall Street; Hazel Street/Paulison Avenue Passaic Main Avenue Terminal; Harrison/MacArthur Avenues; Market Street; Saddle River Road	No Sunday service; Formerly the P7 route.; Service terminated at Market Street and Caldwell Avenue in Saddle Brook until September 1, 2012.
709	Bloomfield Railroad Station; Passaic Main Avenue Terminal (Saturdays)	Westfield Garden State Plaza; Passaic Main Avenue Terminal (Saturdays)	Passaic Avenue; Broadway; Rochelle Avenue (Rochelle Park); Main Street (Lodi); Passaic Street (Garfield and Passaic)	Formerly the P9 route.; Service formerly terminated at intersection of Passaic Street and Main Avenue in Passaic past 7 PM weekdays.
744	Passaic Main Avenue Terminal; Paterson City Hall (evenings)	Wayne; Preakness Shopping Center; Paterson City Hall (evenings)	Lakeview Avenue; Park Avenue/16th Avenue; Presidential Boulevard; Haledon Avenue/Pompton Road; Paterson-Hamburg Turnpike	Formerly the P54 route.; Paterson is terminus for routes leaving Passaic after 6 PM and leaving Wayne after 7 PM.
758	Passaic Main Avenue Terminal	Paramus Park Mall	Plauderville Station; Garfield Station; Elmwood Park; Saddle Brook; Garden State Plaza; Bergen Regional Medical Center; Fashion Center	No Sunday service
780	Passaic Main Avenue Terminal	Englewood Hospital	Main Avenue; Boulevard; Cedar Lane; Lafayette Avenue	Formerly the B80 Englewood-Passaic route.; Before that, it was the 80 and went into New York's GW Bridge Bus Terminal.

== See also ==
- List of New Jersey Transit bus routes (700–799)
- New Jersey Transit Bus Operations
