= Hackensack Bus Terminal =

Regional bus station in New Jersey

Coordinates: 40°52′55″N 74°02′32″W

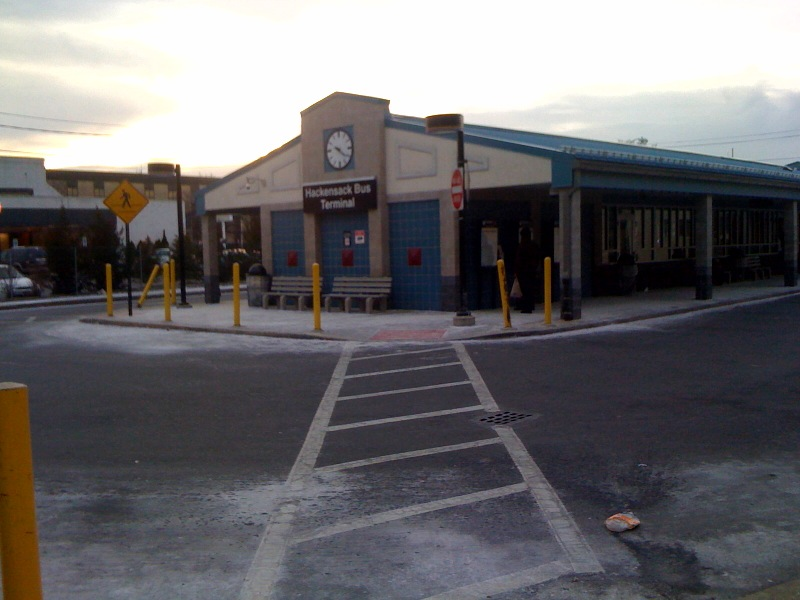
The terminal as viewed from River Street

Hackensack Bus Terminal, also called the Hackensack Bus Transfer, is a regional bus station in downtown Hackensack, New Jersey, owned and operated by New Jersey Transit. The bus station was built in the 1970s and was extensively renovated in 2007 while starting in 2006. An outdoor central island boarding–disembarking area surrounds an indoor waiting room and ticketing facilities. Service from nearby bus stops travels to locations in Bergen, Passaic, Essex and Hudson counties as well as the Port Authority Bus Terminal and George Washington Bridge Bus Station in New York City. In October 2018, the Hackensack Transit Connector, servicing the bus terminal, the city's train stations, and the County Courthouse Complex, was initiated.

== Location and vicinity ==
The bus station is located on River Street one block east of the commercial district on Main Street. Nearby is the New Jersey Naval Museum's USS Ling on the bank of the Hackensack River. Reminders of the original colonial city centered on the First Reformed Dutch Church and the county seat of Bergen County, including the Bergen County Court House, are also in the immediate vicinity. The White Manna, an iconic 1946 diner, and the Bergen Museum of Art & Science are located just north on River Street.

The station is approximately equidistant between two of the three train stations on New Jersey Transit's Pascack Valley Line that serve the city. Transfer to any of them requires a short walk or bus trip. Essex Street Station serves the southern part of the downtown and the Hackensack University Medical Center, while Anderson Street Station serves the northern part including Farleigh Dickenson University. The three transit hubs are part of Hackensack's transit-oriented development plan, and potential transit village initiative, which was granted in February 2016. The proposed Passaic-Bergen Rail Line would terminate to the west at nearby State Street. The New Bridge Landing Station (for a time known as North Hackensack) is located over the city's northern border near the city line of adjoining River Edge.

== Routes ==
Originating, terminating, or stopping at bus station:

Route	Destination	Major Points	Notes
76 NJT	Newark Penn Station	Essex Street Station; Rutherford Station; Kearny; Newark Broad Street	
83 NJT	Journal Square Transportation Center; Jersey City	Teaneck; The Ridgefields; Tonnelle Avenue; Summit Avenue	
178 NJT	GWB Station; Manhattan	Teaneck; Englewood; Fort Lee; GWB Plaza	Englewood/Teaneck (northern route) variant of Route 182
182 NJT	GWB Station; Manhattan	Fort Lee; GWB Plaza	Leonia/Teaneck/Bogota (southern route) variant of Route 178
712 NJT	Willowbrook Mall or Totowa Industrial Park rush hours only	Essex Street Station; Saddle Brook; Paterson (NJT station)	
751 NJT	Bergen Community College		Additional service to BCC available on 755
751 NJT	Edgewater Commons	Anderson Avenue; Nungesser's	Additional service to Edgewater Commons via different routing on 755
752 NJT	Ridgewood; Oakland	Paramus; The Outlets at Bergen Town Center Bergen Regional Medical Center; Paramus Park	Off-peak service operates only between Hackensack and Ridgewood; No Sunday service
755 NJT	Bergen Community College		Additional service to BCC available on 751
755 NJT	Edgewater Commons	Palisade Avenue	Additional service to Edgewater Commons via different routing on 751
762 NJT	Paramus Park	Farleigh Dickenson University; The Shops at Riverside; Kinderkamack Road	no Sunday service
770 NJT	Paterson Broadway Bus Terminal	Westfield Garden State Plaza; Passaic Street; Fairlawn; Broadway (NJT station); Broadway	no Sunday service to Westfield Garden State Plaza
772 southbound NJT	Meadowlands Sports Complex	Main Street; Moonachie Road; Harmon Cove; County Avenue	Midday and PM service only.; Service from New Milford to Hackensack only during AM rush hours stops on Main Street
780 westbound NJT	Passaic	Essex Street Station; Hasbrouck Heights	No Sunday service
780 eastbound NJT	Englewood Hospital	Main Street; Teaneck	No Sunday service

FT 1X-Hackensack Bus Transfer to/from Inwood West 204th Street and Nagle Avenue in Manhattan, NY via Fort Lee Road, GWB and Broadway.

== Bergen County local routes ==
Traveling within city limits.

route	terminal	Hackensack stop	terminal	main streets of travel	notes
753 NJT	The Outlets at Bergen Town Center	Main Street; State Street	New Milford or Cresskill	Teaneck Road; Madison Avenue (New Milford trips only); Union Avenue (Cresskill trips only)	Trips alternate between the two branches
756 NJT	Bergen Community College	The Shops at Riverside	Englewood Cliffs	Route 4 New Bridge Landing; The Shops at Riverside; Reichelt Road (alternate trips); Tryon Avenue; Fort Lee Road	
772 NJT	New Milford	Main Street; State Street	Meadowlands Sports Complex	Teaneck Road (New Milford trips only); Moonachie Road; County Avenue; Harmon Cove	Trips outside of rush hours operate only between the Meadowlands and Hackensack

== Port Authority Bus Terminal routes ==
route	via Hudson County	in Hackensack	Bergen terminal	major points	notes
144 NJT	westbound AM peak AND eastbound PM peak via NJ 495 Marginal Highway	Essex Street	Paramus or Elmwood Park	Route 4, Essex Street, Moonachie Avenue	rush hours only
145 NJT		Essex Street	Fair Lawn	Century Road, Morlot Avenue	peak service only
155 NJT		Main and Anderson	Teaneck	The Outlets at Bergen Town Center	No weekend service
164 NJT		Essex Street	Midland Park	Paterson Plank Road; Meadowlands Sports Complex	
165 NJT	Nungessers; Boulevard East	Main Street	Westwood	New Bridge Landing (NJT station); Kinderkamack Road	Boulevard East full-time local service; New Jersey Turnpike Express weekday rush hours and Saturdays only; Garden State Parkway weekday rush hours only
168 NJT	Nungessers; Boulevard East	Main and Anderson	Paramus Park	Boulevard East Queen Anne Road, Cedar Lane, Forest Avenue	Boulevard East full-time local service; New Jersey Turnpike express weekday rush hours only

== See also ==
- Bergen BRT
