= Ridgewood Bus Terminal =

Transportation hub in New Jersey, U.S.

Coordinates: 40.99136°N 74.09610°W

Ridgewood Bus Terminal is a New Jersey Transit transportation hub located in downtown Ridgewood, New Jersey, United States. The terminal is located on the northwest corner of the intersection of Oak Street and Dayton Street at Van Neste Square, approximately 820 feet (250 m) ESE of NJTransit's Ridgewood train station.

== Facilities ==
There is no actual terminal service at the Ridgewood Bus Terminal. A shelter is available to protect waiting passengers from weather, and several benches are available for seating. The original bus shelter was demolished

== Routes ==
The following New Jersey Transit routes serve Ridgewood Bus Terminal:

- 163 to Port Authority Bus Terminal (limited service to Upper Ridgewood and Westfield Garden State Plaza)
- 164 to Port Authority Bus Terminal and Midland Park
- 175 to George Washington Bridge Bus Station (limited service to Bergen Community College and Westfield Garden State Plaza)
- 364 to Upper Ridgewood (Seasonal Service)
- 722 to Main St/Crooks Ave. in Paterson via Midland Park and Paramus Park
- 746 to Broadway Bus Terminal (Paterson)
- 752 to Hackensack Bus Terminal and Copper Tree Center in Oakland
