= List of NJ Transit bus routes (700–799) =

#6116, in NJT branding, operates on the 751 line in Fairview.

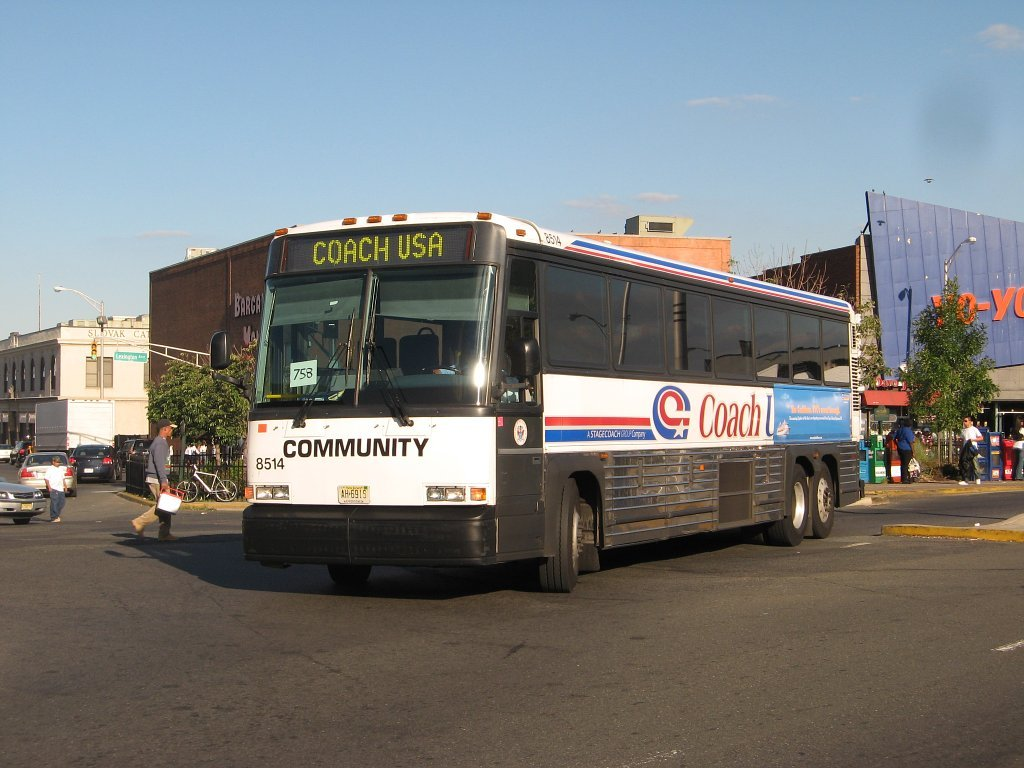
#8514 in contractor branding operating on the 758 line (identifiable by a windshield sign), in Passaic.

New Jersey Transit operates the following routes within Passaic and Bergen counties. All routes are exact fare lines. Only routes operated directly from New Jersey Transit's Northern Division and route 772 operate on Sundays.

== Northern Division ==
These lines are operated from Market Street Garage in Paterson, New Jersey. Destinations shown are for the full route except for branching. Some trips may only travel a portion of the route.

Route	Terminals		Major points	Notes	History
703	American Dream	Haledon	Paterson Avenue, Passaic Bus Terminal, Lakeview Avenue,Paterson Station, Broadway Bus Terminal	Evening and Sunday service is truncated to Broadway Bus Terminal.	Service formerly extended into North Haledon along High Mountain Road.; Formerly the P3 line.; On August 30, 2019, service was extended to terminate at the American Dream Mall in East Rutherford, along with the 85 and 772.
704	Paterson Riverside	Willowbrook Mall	River Street, McBride Avenue or Browertown Road, Main Street	Trips alternate between McBride Avenue and Browertown Road, designated 704M or 704B.	Formerly the P4 line.
712	Hackensack Bus Terminal	Willowbrook Mall	Essex Street/Market Street, Union Boulevard	Select weekday rush hour trips are extended to Totowa Industrial Park.; Select late evening trips short turn at Market Street Garage in Paterson.	Trips were formerly marked "via Furler" or "via Minnisink"; then later served Minnisink Road via Totowa Road. NJT discontinued these trips, and all service to or from Willowbrook operates via Furler Street.; Formerly the P12 route.
770	Hackensack Bus Terminal	Paterson Broadway Bus Terminal	Passaic Street, Garden State Plaza, Route 4	Sunday service skips Garden State Plaza.	Formerly the B20 route; before that it was part of the 102/104 line to Newark - the other part now the 76 line

== Contract operations ==
These routes are operated by Academy Bus in Hackensack. These routes were originally under Coach USA Community Coach until they became bankrupt. Service was transferred to Academy Bus on August 17, 2024. Destinations shown are for the full route except for branching. Some trips may only travel a portion of the route. There is no Sunday service on any line listed below except route 772; some routes may have additional restrictions.

=== Passaic County local routes ===
Route	Terminals		Major Streets	Notes	History
702	Elmwood Park	Paterson St. Joseph's University Medical Center	Valley Road, Van Houten Avenue, Dayton Avenue or Wessington Avenue, Mola Boulevard	Buses alternate via either Dayton Avenue in Clifton or Wessington Avenue in Garfield.	Formerly the P2 route.
705	Passaic; Bus Terminal	Willowbrook Mall	Clifton Avenue, Long Hill Road, Main Street		Formerly the P5 route.
707	Paterson City Hall	Paramus Garden State Plaza	Hazel Street/Paulison Avenue, Passaic Bus Terminal, Harrison/MacArthur Avenues, Market Street, Saddle River Road		Service terminated at Market Street and Caldwell Avenue in Saddle Brook until September 1, 2012.; Formerly the P7 route.
709	Bloomfield Station	Paramus Garden State Plaza	Broad Street, Broughton Avenue, Broadway, Passaic Street, Union Street, Rochelle Avenue	Select weekend trips terminate at Main Avenue in Passaic.	Formerly the P9 route.; Formerly served Bergen Town Center.
722	Paterson	Paramus Park	Memorial Drive, Lafayette Avenue, East Ridgewood Avenue, Ridgewood Bus Terminal	Weekday rush hours only	Formerly the P22 route.
744	Passaic Bus Terminal	Wayne; Preakness Shopping Center	Lakeview Avenue, Park Avenue, Paterson City Hall, Haledon Avenue, William Paterson University	Evening service runs between Preakness Shopping Center and Paterson City Hall.	Formerly the P54 route.; Service via William Paterson University Valley Road Campus began on August 31, 2002.
746	Paterson Broadway Bus Terminal	Ridgewood Bus Terminal	Broadway, Madison Avenue, Maple Avenue		Formerly the P86 route.
748	Paterson; Madison Avenue and 3rd Street	Willowbrook Mall	Madison Avenue, Broadway, Ratzer Road	Select weekday rush hour trips run between Pompton Lakes and Broadway Terminal.	Formerly the P86 route.; Service via Wayne Route 23 Transit Center began on January 12, 2008.

=== Bergen County local routes ===
Route	Terminals		Major Points	Notes	History
751	Paramus Bergen Community College	Edgewater Commons	Spring Valley Avenue, Hackensack Bus Terminal, DeGraw Avenue, Fycke Lane, Anderson Avenue, Nungessers		Extended to Edgewater Commons in 1996.; Extended to Bergen Community College on March 1, 2003.; Formerly the B1 Hudson River route.; Served Paterson until the early 1970's.
752	Hackensack Bus Terminal	Ridgewood Bus Terminal	Forest Avenue, Linwood Avenue, Franklin Avenue	Weekday rush hour service is extended to Copper Tree Shopping Center in Oakland.	Formerly the B2 Western Bergen route (Cross County).; Formerly "Cross County Line" before being the B2 Cross County route.
753	Paramus Bergen Town Center	New Milford or Cresskill	Cedar Lane, Teaneck Road, Washington Avenue, Madison Avenue	Trips alternate between New Milford and Cresskill.	Formerly the B3 route.
755	Paramus Bergen Community College	Edgewater Commons	Spring Valley Avenue, Cedar Lane, Fycke Lane, Main Street, Route 5		Split off from the 751 in 1998.; Extended to Bergen Community College on March 1, 2003.
756	Paramus Bergen Community College	Englewood Cliffs	Route 4, Garden State Plaza, Reichelt Road, Tryon Avenue, Fort Lee Road, GWB Plaza		Formerly the B6 East Bergen route and the B10 route.; Section between Bergen Community College and The Outlets at Bergen Town Center was the 760 route before it was combined with the 756 in 1998.; Service to Paramus Arcola was discontinued on July 10, 2000 and service rerouted between Bergen Community College and Garden State Plaza using Century Road and Route 17.
758	Passaic Bus Terminal	Paramus Park	Monroe Street, Midland Avenue, Saddle River Road, Farview Avenue		Formerly the B8 route.
762	Hackensack Bus Terminal	Paramus Park	Hackensack Avenue, River Road, Kinderkamack Road		Service to Bergen Town Center discontinued on March 1, 2003.; Formerly the B12 route.
772	Paramus Bergen Community College	American Dream	Teaneck Road, Cedar Lane, Hackensack Bus Terminal, Gotham Parkway	Operates Sunday service.; Weekend service runs between Hackensack and American Dream and skips Gotham Parkway.	Formerly the B72 route between Moonachie and New Milford.; Extended to Bergen Community College on June 22, 2013.; Extended to American Dream Mall on August 30, 2019.; Formerly went to Secaucus via the Harmon Cove Outlet Center, service cut off in 2010 during the budget crisis.
780	Passaic Bus Terminal	Englewood Hospital	Main Avenue, Boulevard, Cedar Lane, Lafayette Avenue		Formerly the B80 Englewood-Passaic route.; Before that, it was the 80 and went into GWB Bus Terminal.

=== Former routes ===
Route	Terminals		Major Streets	History
P6	Passaic Bus Terminal	Rutherford		Discontinued in the early 1990's; Used as a rail connection.
B7	Hackensack	Closter		Discontinued in the early 1980s due to low ridership.
B17 (first use)	Ridgewood	Closter		Discontinued in the early 1980s due to low ridership.
B17 (second use) "Paramus Shuttle"	Paramus Park	Garden State Plaza		Discontinued in the early 1980s due to low ridership.; Counterpart to the B16.
742	Paterson	Greystone Park Psychiatric Hospital		Discontinued in June 2010 due to low ridership and a budget crisis. It ran only as one Saturday round trip.; Formerly route P82
754	Moonachie	Bergen Town Center		Discontinued in 1998 and absorbed by the 772 route.; Formerly Route B4
760	Englewood	Bergen Community College		Discontinued in 1998; Formerly route B10
766 "Mall Link"	Fashion Center	Garden State Plaza		Discontinued in 1998; Formerly Route B16; Served the Bergen Mall and other malls in Paramus
768 "Madison/Midland Aves"	Englewood	Fair Lawn		Discontinued in the late 1980s due to low ridership.; Formerly Route B18
775	Paterson	Paramus		Initiated on January 4, 1999, due to Route 4/17 construction.; Discontinued in 2000.
