= Community Coach =

American commercial intercity bus service

Coach USA Community Coach

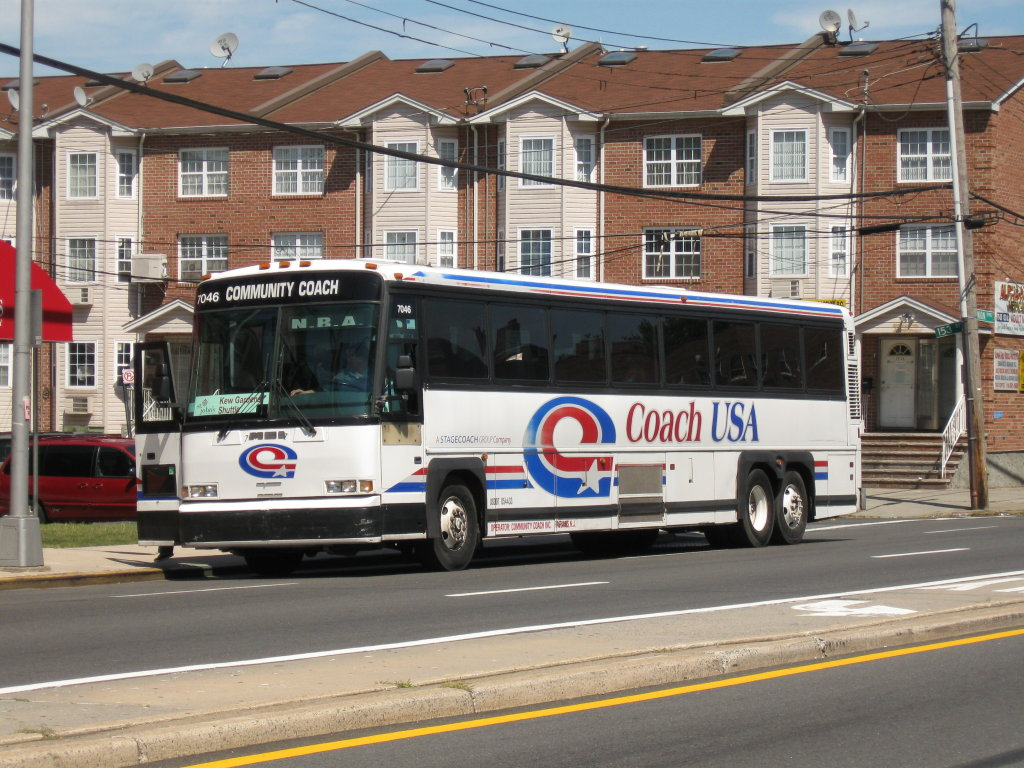
- Community Coach #7046 in charter service.
- Parent: Coach USA
- Founded: 1958
- Headquarters: 160 Route 17, Paramus, New Jersey
- Locale: Greater New York
- Service area: Passaic, Essex, and Morris counties (transit service); Greater New York (charter service); I-95 corridor to Washington (intercity)
- Service type: Line run Intercity service Contract operations Charter bus service
- Routes: 1 controlled University shuttles for various colleges in Greater New York
- Operator: Coach USA
- Chief executive: Newel Scoon
- Website: Community Coach

Community Coach is a bus operator in northern New Jersey owned by Coach USA, operating fixed route and charter service.

In June 2024, Coach USA filed for Chapter 11 bankruptcy, blaming corporate impact caused by the COVID-19 pandemic. The company has plans to sell its assets, and plans to sell its Megabus subsidiaries (including Community Coach) to Bus Company Holdings, a unit of the Renco Group.

In November 2024, it was announced that the Renco Group had completed the purchase of the company. On December 31, 2024, Coach USA and all subsidiaries converted their Chapter 11 cases to a Chapter 7 bankruptcy liquidation.

== Routes ==
=== Directly controlled ===
Community Coach, as Community Transit Lines, operates a single line run from the Port Authority Bus Terminal (most trips) or the United Nations (77XE) in New York City to the Livingston Mall in Livingston, the #77 line, via Main Street in Orange, Route 10, and Ridgedale Avenue, 77X via Northfield, 77L via GS Pkwy, 77XP via Prospect Av, and 77XC express seven days a week. This line was previously operated by DeCamp.

=== Formerly contracted under NJT ===
Under contract to New Jersey Transit, Community Coach, operating as Community Transportation, operated the following routes under, which run Monday through Saturday only unless otherwise indicated. The contract for these routes were transferred to Academy Bus on August 17, 2024.

==== Passaic County local routes ====
| Route | Terminal A | Main streets of travel | Terminal B |
|---|---|---|---|
| NJT bus 702 schedule | Paterson; St. Joseph's Hospital (Main St/Mary St.) | Van Houten Avenue; Palisade Avenue or Dayton Avenue; Boulevard | Elmwood Park; Boulevard/Broadway |
| NJT bus 705 schedule | Passaic; Main Avenue Terminal | Clifton Avenue; Main Street | Willowbrook Mall |
| NJT bus 707 schedule | Paterson; City Hall | Marshall Street/Hazel Street/Paulson Avenue; Harrison and MacArthur Avenues | Saddle Brook; Market St/Caldwell Ave. |
| NJT bus 709 schedule | Bloomfield; Glenwood Ave/Conger St., OR; Passaic; Main Ave/Passaic Ave. | Passaic Avenue; Broadway; Rochelle Avenue | Garden State Plaza |
| NJT bus 722 schedule | Paterson; Main St/Crooks Ave. | Memorial Drive; Lafayette Avenue; East Ridgewood Avenue | Paramus Park |
| NJT bus 744 schedule | Passaic; Main Avenue Terminal | Lakeview Avenue; Presidential Boulevard; Paterson-Hamburg Turnpike | Wayne; Preakness Shopping Center, OR; Paterson; City Hall |
| NJT bus 746 schedule | Broadway Bus Terminal (Paterson) | Madison Avenue; Maple Avenue | Ridgewood; Van Neste Square |
| NJT bus 748 schedule | Paterson; Madison Ave/3 St. | Broadway; Ratzer Road (Willowbrook Mall trips only); Paterson-Hamburg Turnpike (Pompton Lakes trips only) | Willowbrook Mall, OR; Pompton Lakes; Wanaque Ave/Ringwood Ave. (rush hours only) |
| NJT bus 758 schedule | Passaic; Main Avenue Terminal | Midland Avenue; Fairview Avenue | Paramus Park |
