= Broadway Bus Terminal =

Transit hub in Paterson, New Jersey, USA

Coordinates: 40°55′08″N 74°10′28″W

The Broadway Bus Terminal is a major local and regional bus terminal in Paterson, New Jersey operated by New Jersey Transit. It is located on Broadway between Memorial Drive and West Broadway in Downtown Paterson, putting it near Passaic County Community College and a few blocks from Paterson City Hall and the Great Falls Historic District, including the Great Falls (Passaic River).

== Facilities and service ==
New Jersey Transit bus operations, some formerly operated by Community Coach, make use of the terminal, one of several origination points in the city and serves an average of 1600 buses each weekday. Buses depart from four sheltered bus lanes adjacent to the indoor waiting room. Indoor and outdoor facilities were renovated and expanded in 2010. The terminal is served by the 72 (to Newark Penn Station), 74 (to Newark Subway, Branch Brook Park), 161 (to Port Authority Bus Terminal), 171 (to George Washington Bridge Bus Terminal), 190 (to Port Authority Bus Terminal), 703 (nights and weekends to Meadowlands Sports Complex), 746 (to Ridgewood), 748 (to Willowbrook Mall), and 770 (to Hackensack Bus Terminal). One of the William Paterson University campus shuttles also serves the terminal.

A ticket office is open daily (6 AM - 8 PM).

== Paterson public transportation ==
Jitney service by Spanish Transportation-owned minibuses (doing business as Express Service) travels from Paterson to locations in Passaic, Bergen, and Hudson counties as well as the Port Authority Bus Terminal and George Washington Bridge Bus Station in New York City. Dollar vans, locally known in Spanish as guaguas are also available in the vicinity traveling to Jersey City, North Hudson and 42nd Street (Manhattan). City Hall has many buses that stop at or near it, going to various points in neighboring communities, Manhattan and regional shopping centers. The Paterson train station is located 10 blocks east of the bus terminal. The Passaic-Bergen Rail Line is a proposed rail line through the city which will make a stop nearby.

== History ==
When constructed in the 1932 and before bustitution, the Public Service Railway operated trolleys from the terminal, namely the Line 1 (Edgewater), Line 5 (Suffern), and Line 15 to Hudson Place (Hoboken). The terminal has been renovated during the course of the years, the most recent refurbishment completed in 2010.

== Paterson bus routes ==
Route	Paterson origination	Main streets of travel	destination
72	Paterson Broadway Bus Terminal	Bloomfield Avenue, Broad Street	Newark Penn Station
74	Paterson Broadway Bus Terminal	Passaic Terminal; Delawanna Station, Kingsland Avenue, Franklin Avenue or Union Avenue	Branch Brook Park; North Newark
151	Paterson (peak service)	Washington Avenue, Route 46, New Jersey Turnpike	Port Authority Bus Terminal
161	Paterson Broadway Bus Terminal	Washington Avenue, Route 46	Port Authority Bus Terminal
171	Paterson Broadway Bus Terminal	St. Joseph's Regional Medical Center; Broadway; Garden State Plaza; Route 4	George Washington Bridge Bus Terminal
190	Paterson Broadway Bus Terminal	Paterson Plank Road, Orient Way, Main Avenue, NJ 495-Marginal Highway	Port Authority Bus Terminal
702	St. Joseph's Regional Medical Center	Van Houten Avenue; Palisade Avenue or Dayton Avenue; Boulevard	Elmwood Park; Boulevard/Broadway
703	Haledon or Paterson Broadway Bus Terminal (Short turn nights and weekends)	Van Houten Avenue; Palisade Avenue or Dayton Avenue; Boulevard	Meadowlands Sports Complex
707	Paterson City Hall	Marshall Street/Hazel Street/Paulson Avenue; Harrison and MacArthur Avenues	Saddle Brook; Market Street/Caldwell Avenue
722	Paterson; Main Street/Crooks Avenue via Paterson City Hall	Memorial Drive; Lafayette Avenue; East Ridgewood Avenue	Paramus Park
744	Paterson City Hall	Lakeview Avenue; Presidential Boulevard; Paterson-Hamburg Turnpike	Passaic; Main Avenue Terminal
746	Paterson Broadway Bus Terminal	Madison Avenue; Maple Avenue	Ridgewood; Van Neste Square
770	Paterson Broadway Bus Terminal	Passaic Street; Broadway	Hackensack Bus Terminal
ES to GWB	Broadway & Main	Route 4 Garden State Plaza via Paramus, Hackensack, Teaneck, Fort Lee	George Washington Bridge Bus Terminal
ES to PA	Broadway & Main	via Clifton, Passaic, Rutherford, Secaucus, North Bergen, Union City and Weehawken	Port Authority Bus Terminal; Gate 56
