= Wayne Towne Center =

Shopping mall in New Jersey, US

Coordinates: 40.8900°N 74.2540°W

- Address: 80 Route 23; Wayne, New Jersey
- Opened: 1974 (as West Belt Mall)
- Closed: 2009 (indoor mall)
- Developer: Arlen Realty
- Owner: Vornado Realty Trust
- Num. of stores: 14
- Num. of anchor tenants: 2 (1 vacant)
- Floors: 1 (2 in anchors, except Costco)
- Parking: Parking Lot

Wayne Towne Center is a regional shopping center located in Wayne, New Jersey, in the New York City metropolitan area, adjacent to Willowbrook Mall along Willowbrook Boulevard. As of 2008, the mall had a gross leasable area of 653,000 square feet (60,700 m^{2}). The center formerly operated as an indoor shopping mall from the time when JCPenney was built, in 1974, until its de-malling in 2008. The inner portion of the mall, which had one floor, has since been demolished.

The center is anchored by Costco, Dick's Sporting Goods, Nordstrom Rack, and UFC Fit. JCPenney closed and moved to Willowbrook Mall in 2024.

== History ==
The complex dates back to 1974 as a strip mall called West Belt Mall that had 175,000 acres (71,000 ha) of retail space and was steadily expanded over time, ultimately being renamed Wayne Towne Center in 1989 as a way to upgrade its image. A project begun in the mid-1990s sought to take a mall that had expanded to nearly 650,000 square feet (60,000 m^{2}) and reconfigure the space to expand the two anchors while reducing the number of other stores by 30% to 49.

Existing in the shadow of Willowbrook Mall, Wayne Towne Center has had difficulty dating back to 1993, when the Neiman Marcus Last Call outlet headed for Pennsylvania.

In January 2008, the Borders Books and Music, which replaced Last Call, was one of three North Jersey locations closed by the chain. The portion of the mall that housed the Borders store was demolished in Fall 2008.

Later in 2008, the mall began undergoing what is referred to as "de-malling", which refers to a process where an enclosed shopping center slowly begins a transition to a more traditional shopping center. In order to accomplish this, the remaining stores in the mall were closed one a time as were two of its anchor stores, Old Navy and Loehmann's. The TGI Friday's restaurant that was located in the mall was replaced by a freestanding location in the parking lot, and the remaining two anchors (JCPenney and Fortunoff) sealed off their mall entrances. The TGI Friday's in the frontmost parking lot was joined by Olive Garden and Bahama Breeze restaurants and a DSW Shoe Warehouse store, while a Chipotle Mexican Grill location was added in the JCPenney rear parking lot. Fortunoff went out of business in 2009, thus costing the mall its second anchor, and construction on other buildings stalled when Dick's Sporting Goods chose to pull out temporarily.

In a deal closed in December 2010, the mall was purchased by Vornado Realty Trust for $12.1 million from Wells Fargo, along with annual lease payments of $2.5 million for the land. A Vornado spokesman said that the company planned to revamp the property, as Vornado had previously done at The Outlets at Bergen Town Center in Paramus, New Jersey.

In March 2014, construction began again in earnest and accelerated. The 215,000-square-foot (20,000 m^{2}) Fortunoff store was demolished after asbestos abatement was completed. Dick's Sporting Goods reconsidered its decision to leave and in November 2014, a two-level store was opened adjacent to JCPenney. One month earlier, Costco opened its new location. Panera Bread opened in the vacant rear half of the Chipotle building. A La-Z-Boy furniture store was added in the JCPenney rear parking lot in mid 2015. A two-story Nordstrom Rack opened in October 2015 and a two-story 24 Hour Fitness opened in January 2016. 24 Hour Fitness closed in 2020 due to the company's bankruptcy. It was replaced by UFC Fit in 2022.

JCPenney, one of the mall's original anchors when it opened in March 1974, announced in February 2024 that it would close its location at the mall after 50 years in March 2024 and relocate to Willowbrook Mall.
