= The Shops at Riverside =

Coordinates: 40°54′33″N 74°02′00″W

- Location: Hackensack, New Jersey, United States
- Opened: March 10, 1977; 49 years ago
- Previous names: Riverside Square Mall (1977-2005)
- Developer: Federated Stores Realty
- Manager: Simon Property Group
- Owner: Simon Property Group
- Num. of stores: 66
- Num. of anchor tenants: 5
- Floor area: 658,261 sq ft (61,154.4 m^{2})
- Floors: 2
- Public transit: NJ Transit bus: 756, 762; Access to NJ Transit's New Bridge Landing station (Pascack Valley Line).
- Website: www.simon.com/mall/the-shops-at-riverside

The Shops at Riverside is a two-level enclosed shopping mall, located in Hackensack, in Bergen County, New Jersey, United States, off Route 4, along the Hackensack River. The mall has a gross leasable area (GLA) of 658,261 sq ft (61,154.4 m^{2}). The mall opened on March 10, 1977, with 620,000 sq ft (58,000 m^{2}) of retail space, which included a 237,000 sq ft (22,000 m^{2}) Bloomingdale's (expanded from an original freestanding site opened in 1959) and a 107,000 sq ft (9,900 m^{2}) Saks Fifth Avenue. Until 2005, the shopping center was known as Riverside Square Mall.

The Shops at Riverside caters to the suburban areas surrounding Hackensack in Bergen, Essex, and Passaic counties in New Jersey as well as Rockland County in New York State. The mall has 66 stores. The anchor stores are Bloomingdale's, Barnes & Noble, Pottery Barn, AMC Theatres, and Arhaus.

== History ==
Originally a freestanding Bloomingdale's built in 1959, an enclosed mall was opened in 1977, and the shopping center became known as Riverside Square Mall. The original mall had a Southern California feel, with terra cotta tile, red brick, and skylights. In 1995, after years of declining traffic and lost tenants and amidst a major renovation and expansion of the nearby Garden State Plaza, The Shops at Riverside was completely renovated with new marble floors, glass railings, and comfortable seating.

From 2004 through 2008, The Mills Corporation of Chevy Chase, Maryland added 248,000 square feet (23,000 m^{2}) of retail and dining space, including 30 new stores and three restaurants, and renamed the mall The Shops at Riverside. Much of the space that was added is in a portion of the mall reclaimed from Bloomingdale's. The original Bloomingdale's Home Store bisected the mall, and was moved to the north end of the existing Bloomingdale's, while the 1977 expansion of Bloomingdale's was renovated in 2005 in preparation for the expansion in 2006. The expansion added three restaurants. It also added a new concourse that linked the north corridor to the south corridor.

In December 2014, Saks closed its Shops at Riverside location, freeing up more than 100,000 square feet (9,300 m^{2}) of space that the company had occupied since 1977. Plans for re-purposing the space as a cinema and dining-entertainment complex were announced in May 2015. An AMC Dine-In Theater with nine screening rooms opened in most of the second floor on September 13, 2017.

The second phase of the renovation project included removal of the glass elevator, new flooring, a new set of escalators by Bloomingdale's, a new staircase in the center court, completion of the second floor portion of the mall and a new glass ball near the new movie theater. Construction finished by November 2018.

The third phase included a new mall entrance with valet parking, a luxury lounge, and a coat check and personal shopping service. Bloomingdale's also renovated their store during this phase. The phase was completed by late 2019.

== Blue laws ==
Due to New Jersey state blue laws that only apply in Bergen County most of the mall is closed on Sundays except for restaurants, the movie theater and those retailers exempt from the Sunday sales restrictions. Due to the mall not being located in Paramus it is notably allowed to have more businesses open on Sundays. The mall was an organizer of an unsuccessful 1993 referendum effort to repeal Bergen County's blue laws. During the aftermath of Hurricane Sandy, then Governor, Chris Christie ordered a suspension for a Sunday, allowing all stores to open. The laws reverted the following week.

== Public transportation ==
NJ Transit bus lines that serve The Shops at Riverside are the 756 and 762 routes.

NJ Transit's New Bridge Landing train station in River Edge is approximately 5 minutes from the mall.
