= Fashion Center =

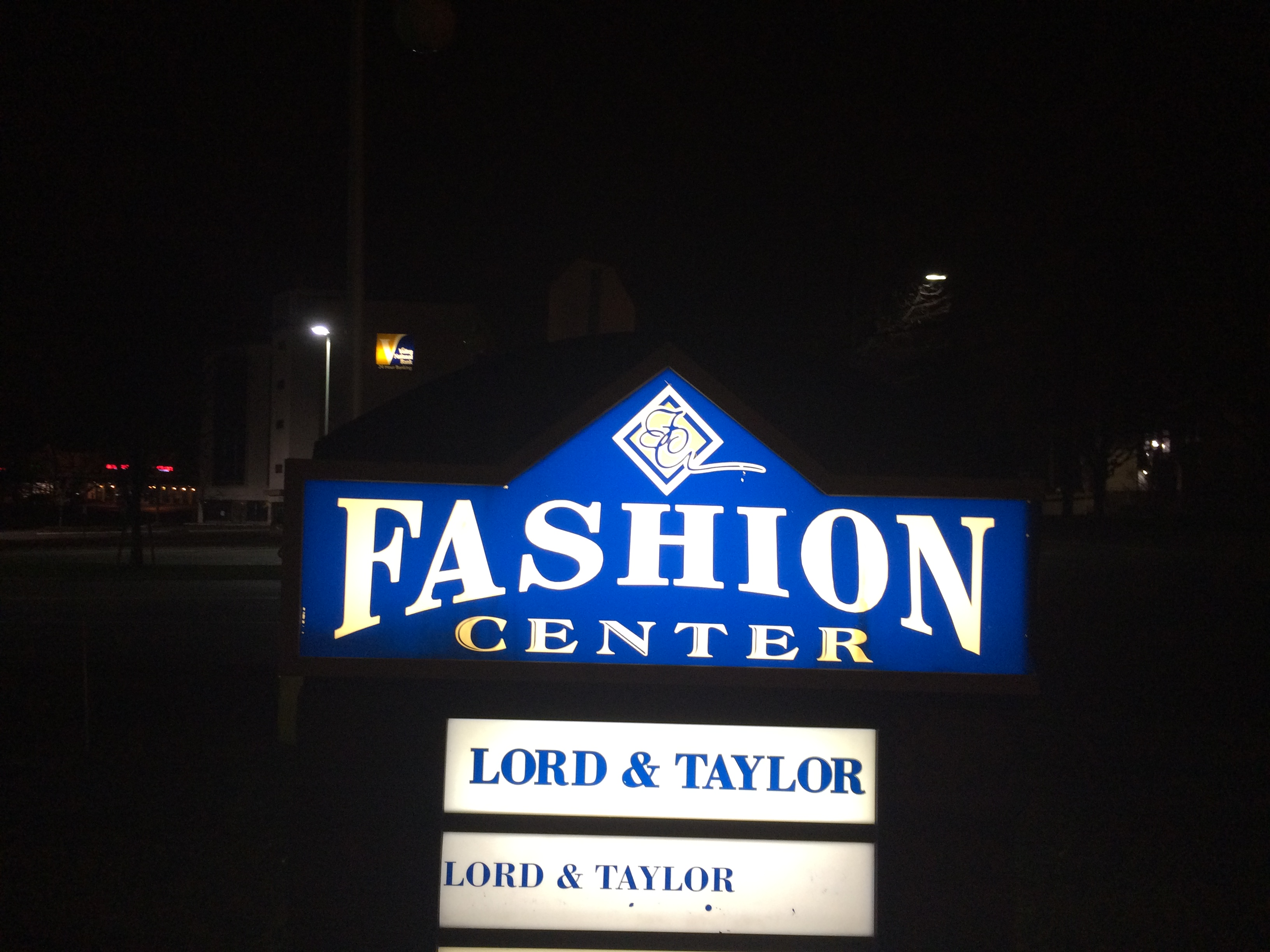
- The Fashion Center sign, still used to this day
- Location: Paramus, New Jersey, United States
- Coordinates: 40.9670°N 74.0754°W
- Opened: February 15, 1967; 59 years ago
- Developer: Associated Dry Goods
- Owner: Willner Realty and Development Co.
- Num. of stores: 11 (as of 2013)
- Num. of anchor tenants: 8 (4 open, 4 vacant)
- Floor area: 446,000 sq ft (41,400 m^{2})
- Floors: 1 (3 in anchors)
- Public transit: NJ Transit bus: 722, 752
- Website: fashioncenterparamusnj.com

The Fashion Center is a shopping center located in Paramus, New Jersey. It opened in 1967 as a traditional indoor shopping mall. The mall slowly underwent a "de-malling" process over a period of several years prior to 2009, which resulted in the former interior portion of the mall gradually taken over by other stores and eventually sealed off, with each store inside the center having its own outside entrances.

The center is currently anchored by Best Buy and T.J. Maxx. A Barnes & Noble bookstore operates in a building adjacent to the former mall, and several other businesses occupy smaller spaces.

The property is owned by Willner Realty of Pennsylvania. It has a gross leasable area of 446,000 sq ft (41,400 m^{2}) and is considered small by modern standards, with less than 15 stores at its peak.

Due to highly restrictive blue laws in Bergen County, with even stricter limitations in Paramus, the Fashion Center is closed on Sundays, except for Applebee's.

== History ==
Prior to the mall's construction, the area was native marsh and grassland where muskrats were trapped and sold for their fur by local residents. The mall opened on February 15, 1967. Hoping to capitalize on the affluent population of Bergen County, it included two anchor stores: Lord & Taylor on the north end and B. Altman and Company on the south end. Associated Dry Goods, then-owners of the Lord & Taylor chain, developed the mall proper.

The department stores were connected to each other by an indoor shopping arcade that was 1,500 feet (460 m) in length. There was also a free-standing Best & Company store in the parking lot that was built while the company was liquidating; the store instead housed a Britt's location and then became a Toys "R" Us store. After Toys "R" Us went bankrupt in 2018, the location at the Fashion Center closed along with its other two flagship stores in Paramus on Route 4 and the Babies "R" Us location on Route 17. The site of the former Toys "R" Us then became a seasonal Spirit Halloween store. In summer 2019, a Big Lots store replaced the former Toys R Us/Spirit Halloween space and opened.

The Fashion Center, which was designed in a contemporary style of decor, was prosperous through the 1970s. The center court included a fountain that was also used in the mall's former logo. But as the years progressed, other malls in the Paramus area, including Westfield Garden State Plaza, Paramus Park, The Shops at Riverside, and The Outlets at Bergen Town Center began to capture its local market share. By the 1980s, this growing competition, coupled with the demise of B. Altman, led to a severe decline in the mall's fortunes. Retailers gradually moved out, leaving Lord & Taylor as its only anchor store and leading some to refer to the Fashion Center as a dead mall.

In 1996, the vacant 180,000 sq ft (17,000 m^{2}) B. Altman space was subdivided. Beginning in 2001, the owners of the Fashion Center began planning for the conversion of the mall to a traditional shopping center. In 2003, as part of the chain's expansion into the New York metropolitan area, Best Buy opened a store at the Fashion Center which necessitated the closure of some of the mall's entrances and the mall entrance of the former B. Altman store. Lord & Taylor followed suit the following year. Then in late 2008, the general mall entrance was closed then renovated and reopened in 2009, and later that year the mall added a Fairway Market store to its lineup of stores, which took up a majority of the former interior space. This completed the Fashion Center's transition from a traditional mall into a collection of separate stores with their own entrances and no interior common space; all stores can only be accessed from the outside.

In September 2011, Lord & Taylor opened their first home store at the Fashion Center. It later closed in 2013 and was replaced by a World Market store in 2016.

In March 2020, it was announced that Fairway Market would be closing its doors at the Fashion Center and the space will be replaced by an Amazon Go market. The official closing date for the Fairway Market location was supposed to be May 15, 2020, but the closing got delayed to the summer of 2020 due to the COVID-19 pandemic.

On August 27, 2020, it was announced that Lord & Taylor would be closing all 38 stores, including the Fashion Center location. The store closed on February 27, 2021.

The Amazon Market opened on July 21, 2022. However, as a result of Amazon Fresh shuttering its physical store operations, the market closed in early 2026.

In September 2022 it was announced that Bed Bath & Beyond will be closing by Fall 2022

The Big Lots location closed around 2023 and it was replaced by a Barnes & Noble, which opened November 2023.

The T.J. Maxx location relocated to the former Lord & Taylor Home/World Market location and opened on September 24, 2026.
