= Bergen Town Center =

Shopping mall in New Jersey

Coordinates: 40°54′58″N 74°03′17″W

- Location: 1 Bergen Town Center; Paramus, New Jersey 07652
- Opened: November 14, 1957; 68 years ago (outdoor plaza); September 16, 1973 (enclosed mall); August 25, 2009 (Major Renovation/Expansion)
- Developer: Allied Stores
- Owner: Urban Edge Properties
- Num. of stores: 100
- Num. of anchor tenants: 2
- Floor area: 917,129 sq ft (85,204.1 m^{2})
- Floors: 1-2 (4 in Old Sterns/Macy's Bldg, Now occupied by Home Goods/Bloomingdale's-The Outlet Store(1), Century 21(2,3), and Lincoln Tech (4)
- Parking: 8,600 spaces
- Public transit: NJ Transit bus: 168, 171, 751, 752, 753, 755, 756
- Website: bergentowncenter.com

Bergen Town Center (formerly known as The Outlets at Bergen Town Center and the Bergen Mall) is a shopping center located in Bergen County, New Jersey, in the United States. The center consists of both an indoor mall and exterior outlying stores and occupies over 105 acres split between the municipalities of Paramus and Maywood.

The center, which was built as the Bergen Mall, opened in 1957 as one of several regional large-scale outdoor shopping centers rolled out nationwide, and was the largest of its kind at the time of its opening. It is the second-oldest mall in New Jersey. The mall offers a gross leasable area (GLA) of 917,129 sq ft (85,204.1 m^{2}). The mall is located at the junction of Route 4 and Forest Avenue, and includes a separate shopping strip, south of Route 4 connected to the rest of the property via a pedestrian bridge. The mall has over the years included community spaces, including a chapel, theater for live dramas, post office, auditorium, ice rink, bowling alley, a children's amusement ride area, and the Bergen Museum of Art & Science. The Bergen Mall was designed by John Graham of New York City. The mall is subject to Bergen County's blue laws, which requires the mall to be closed on Sundays, except for some restaurants and other non-clothing establishments.

== History ==
The mall was first planned in 1955 by Allied Stores to have 100 stores and 8,600 parking spaces in a 1.5 million ft^{2} mall that would include a 300,000 sq ft (28,000 m^{2}) Stern's store and two other 150,000 sq ft (14,000 m^{2}) department stores as part of the initial design. Allied's chairman B. Earl Puckett announced The Bergen Mall as the largest of ten proposed centers, stating that there were 25 cities that could support such centers and that no more than 50 malls of this type would be built nationwide. The mall opened on November 14, 1957 with great fanfare, as Dave Garroway, host of The Today Show served as master of ceremonies. Bergen Mall got its second anchor when a 135,000 sq ft (12,500 m^{2}) Ohrbach's location opened on August 17, 1967.

=== Conversion to indoor mall ===
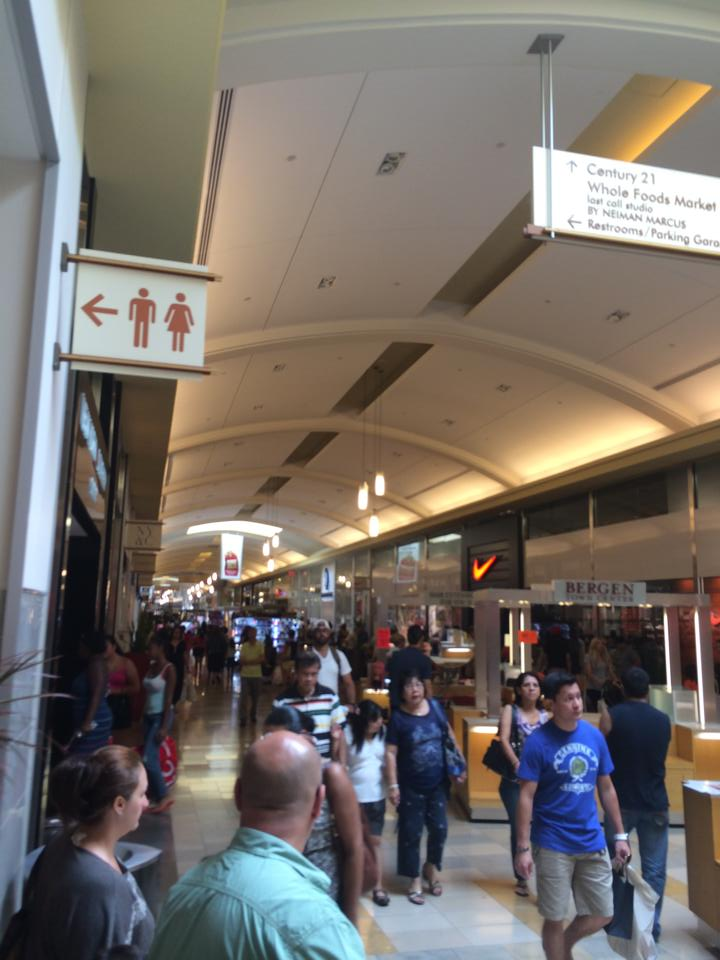
The interior area of the mall

In July 1972, the owners of the Bergen Mall announced that they would begin converting the facility from an outdoor shopping plaza with a vast number of stores to an enclosed structure with all of these stores operating under one roof; the new mall would be anchored by Stern's at one end of the enclosed structure and Ohrbach's at the other. This was part of a general trend underway at the time where large-scale outdoor centers, like the Bergen Mall, had been for its first fifteen years and Garden State Plaza, which had been commissioned by R.H. Macy and Company and opened in 1957, was at the time, were no longer as popular while massive indoor facilities, like the Fashion Center (which opened in 1967) in Paramus and Willowbrook Mall (which opened in 1968) in Wayne, were becoming more and more popular. On September 15, 1973, the renovated mall held its grand reopening. Unlike its other regional counterparts, however, the Bergen Mall did not make attempts to modernize its look as the years wore on and proceeded to look dated.

=== Steinbach becomes secondary anchor ===
In January 1987, the Bergen Mall lost one of its two anchors when Ohrbach's closed its doors; its parent company, Amcena, had acquired the Steinbach chain of stores from Supermarkets General Corporation and elected to retire the Ohrbach's brand altogether, closing all but five of Ohrbach's stores and converting the remaining stores to Steinbach, which reopened the Bergen Mall store two months later. Amcena eventually sold the Steinbach chain to Ohio-based Schottenstein's in 1994, which then sold most of the stores to Crowley Milner in 1995. The Bergen Mall store, which was one of the stores Schottenstein's kept, was eventually converted to the company's Value City brand, then closed and was demolished in the mid-2000s while a Target store was built on the space; the Target opened in March 2009.

=== Move to outlet center model ===
In the early 1990s the mall was repositioned as a value-oriented center that included a Marshalls, Gap Outlet, and a Saks Off 5th outlet. Across the street from the main mall is a little strip mall that was part of the mall property. It is located across from Forest Avenue and was connected with an auto and a pedestrian bridge. Chuck E. Cheese's opened in the mini strip mall across the street in 1993. It closed in November 2010 due to the redevelopment plans of that area including the old former Health Spa 2 The Chuck E. Cheese relocated to the Shoppes at IV in 2011. The site of the former Chuck E. Cheese's later became a Red Robin restaurant. Other tenants in the strip mall were Spa 2 (closed 2004; replaced by REI) and Shop Rite. The Shop Rite store closed in 1998 and was moved to its current location on Route 4 near the mall. Kirkland's Furniture occupied the former Shop Rite space in the strip mall until 2020. In 2026, the strip mall was demolished except for the Best Buy, Lowe's, 24 Hour Fitness, and Miller's Ale House. The site of the strip mall will be an apartment complex known as Bergen Chapters and is expected to be completed by late 2027.

=== Macy's opening ===
Another major change came to the mall in 2001, and this involved the store it had been built around. In 1992, Stern's owner Allied Stores merged with Federated Department Stores. Two years later, Federated acquired R.H. Macy and Company out of bankruptcy. This gave Federated the position of having three different properties being anchors at the three major Paramus malls. In addition to Stern's and the A&S store co-anchoring Paramus Park, the acquisition gave Federated control of the Macy's store at Garden State Plaza.

In 1995, the year after acquiring Macy's, Federated decided to discontinue their A&S brand and converted the Paramus Park location to a Macy's to give them a second location in Paramus. Six years later, they made a similar decision to retire the Stern's brand and the Bergen Mall flagship joined most of its other sibling stores and was rebranded as Macy's. Federated did not keep the store open much longer, however, electing to liquidate it in 2005 and focus on their other two Paramus locations. Shortly after, the Macy's was converted into a Century 21 store.

=== Lawsuit ===
The Bergen Mall was the target of a lawsuit by nuclear-freeze advocates who challenged the mall's restrictions on distribution of literature to shoppers. On October 12, 1984, Bergen County Superior Court judge Paul R. Huot ruled that the organization should be allowed to distribute literature anywhere and anytime in a shopping mall, noting that "the Bergen Mall has assumed the features and characteristics of the traditional town center for the citizens who reside in Paramus and surrounding Bergen County towns."

=== Chapel ===
The Carmelite Chapel of St. Therese was located in the basement section called "The Village" since 1970, modeled after the Carmelite location in the basement of Northshore Mall, which opened in 1960. It moved to the upper level in 2007 when the center was redesigned. The chapel had masses daily from Monday-Saturday. However, since the mall is closed on Sundays, the chapel was closed and did not provide Sunday masses. The chapel also housed a gift shop which was located next to the chapel entrance. The chapel held its final mass on March 1, 2017 before closing its doors for good.

=== Other ===
The mall's water feature was a dandelion fountain, a replica of the El Alamein Fountain in Sydney and the twin fountains at the entrance of 1345 Avenue of the Americas on Sixth Avenue in Manhattan.

Bergen Mall was also the first stop on MCA Records's "The Beautiful You: Celebrating The Good Life Shopping Mall Tour '87" starring teen pop sensation Tiffany as an alternative way to promote her debut album.

In 1987, the mall was acquired by Simon Property Group, who in turn would later sell the mall to Vornado Realty Trust in 2003. Vornado would proceed with plans to convert the mall's format to include high-profile stores, and made changes to the looks of the mall.

In one of the first changes planned for the mall, Century 21 opened on August 10, 2006, taking 67,500 sq ft (6,270 m^{2}) of space in the old Stern's/Macy's building. Century 21 occupies the middle two floors of the four-story building (1&2), while Home Goods/Bloomingdale's-The Outlet Store occupy the Lower Level (LL) and Lincoln Tech occupies the 3rd floor (3).

On November 30, 2006, the Paramus Planning Board approved a series of changes that would bring the mall up to 1,500,000 sq ft (140,000 m^{2}) at a cost of $171 million. The mall was renamed to Bergen Town Center, and was planned to include 872,000 sq ft (81,000 m^{2}) of renovated mall retail space and a 167,000 sq ft (15,500 m^{2}) freestanding big-box store across Forest Avenue in Maywood, Lowe's which opened in January 2011. A total of 4,339 parking spaces, including a five-story parking garage, will be provided.

New additions in 2009, in addition to Target, included a Wetzel's Pretzels, Subway, Baskin-Robbins, Dunkin' Donuts, Verizon Wireless, an AT&T store, and a Whole Foods (which opened on August 19, 2009 and signed a lease for 77,000 sq ft (7,200 m^{2}).), Filene's Basement (opened October 28, 2007, since closed and replaced by Home Goods which opened in October 2013.), Lowe's, Nike Factory Store (opened March 7, 2009), Bobby Flay's Bobby's Burger Palace (opened March 31, 2009), and Nordstrom Rack (Opened March 12, 2009). A Grand Opening Celebration was held on August 25, 2009 to mark the completion of the renovation/expansion. Filene's Basement filed for bankruptcy protection on Monday, May 4, 2009. An affiliate of Men's Wearhouse has won the bidding process, with plans to keep approximately 20 of the chain's stores open. The five-year-old Filene's at Bergen Town Center is one of six stores that closed as part of the transaction. In October 2013, Home Goods opened in the space formerly occupied by Filene's Basement. This is their second location in Paramus, the other being on NJ-17 near Ridgewood Ave. H&M will be opening its third Paramus location at Bergen Town Center Holiday 2013. The 27,000 sq. feet two-level store will be larger than the H&M stores at Westfield Garden State Plaza and Paramus Park and will be located at the center of the mall next to J. Crew Outlet.

In 2015, it was confirmed that the mall would undergo a $130 million 200,000 square foot expansion, which was to include adding an additional level, as well as new tenants.

In January 2018, it was announced that the Best Buy location at nearby Westfield Garden State Plaza would close and be relocated to the Outlets at Bergen Town Center property next to the strip mall. It opened on April 14, 2018. In June 2018, it was announced that a Burlington Coat Factory store would go above Marshall's and would occupy space that used to house the Chapel on the mall as well as some mall offices. The mall ceiling between Saks OFF 5th and Marshall's is expected to be raised so that escalators and an elevator are able to reach the store. The Burlington Coat Factory store opened in August 2019. Also, Pei Wei Asian Diner and Potbelly Sandwich closed in the mall to make way for Ruth's Chris Steak House, which opened in November 2018. It was also announced that the current bridge that connects the mall and the other shops on the other side would be replaced. The former Midas Tire shop is also expected with a new restaurant that is yet to be determined. The work on the Parking Deck near Marshalls and Saks OFF 5th and the bridge are all expected to be complete by September 2018.

In the summer of 2020, Kirkland’s Furniture closed. On September 10, 2020, it was announced that Century 21 would be closing all stores, including the Bergen Town Center location. The location closed on December 5, 2020. Kohl's relocated from Paramus Place Shopping Center to Bergen Town Center, inside the former Century 21 in late 2022.

=== Playhouse on the Mall ===
From 1960 to 1982, the mall included the Playhouse on the Mall, a 635-seat theater. The developer, Allied Stores, was persuaded to build the theater by producer (and future novelist) Robert Ludlum, who managed the theater from 1960 to 1970. Productions included a mix of Broadway revivals (The Best Man, Two for the Seesaw, A Little Night Music) and pre-Broadway tryouts (The Typists and the Tiger, The Owl and the Pussycat), and attracted a variety of movie, television, and Broadway talent. The theater's most successful production was an annual stop by Ann Corio's This Was Burlesque revue. The theater closed in the face of rising costs and dwindling audiences, and was converted to retail space in 1986.

== Incidents ==
- While the mall was under renovation in 2008, a wall in the mall collapsed, which injured two guests. They were hospitalized afterwards.
- In 2014, two boys and a man were injured from a falling glass. It fell about 30 feet from a balcony barrier on the second floor and shattered in front of the Old Navy outlet store. The boys were hospitalized and the man received a bandage.
