= St. Joseph's Regional Medical Center =

Coordinates: 40.9025°N 74.1658°W

St. Joseph's University Medical Center
- St. Joseph's Health

Geography
- Location: 703 Main Street; Paterson, New Jersey, USA

Organisation
- Care system: Private
- Type: General regional

Services
- Emergency department: Level II Trauma Center

History
- Founded: 1867

Links
- Website: https://www.StJosephsHealth.org
- Lists: Hospitals in New Jersey

St. Joseph's University Medical Center is a member of St. Joseph's Health. Located in Paterson, New Jersey, St. Joseph's University Medical Center, which includes St. Joseph's Children's Hospital, is a major academic medical center and state designated trauma center that cares for most complex and routine cases. There is also a second acute care hospital located in Wayne, New Jersey on Hamburg Turnpike under the St. Joseph's Health umbrella.

The hospital was founded in 1867 and is sponsored by its founders, the Sisters of Charity of Saint Elizabeth.

St. Joseph's University Medical Center is part of St. Joseph's Health, which encompasses St. Joseph's University Medical Center, St. Joseph's Children's Hospital, St. Joseph's Wayne Medical Center, St. Joseph's Healthcare and Rehab Center, and Visiting Health Services of NJ.

== Quality of Care ==
- St. Joseph's University Medical Center is Ranked #10 in New Jersey by US News and World Report. The hospital did not participate in US News's 2023 Best Hospitals for Maternity survey and so was not assessed for its performance on that.
- HospitalSafetyGrade.org gave this hospital a 'C' grade for patient safety in the Fall of 2023. The rate of patient infections at the hospital was significantly above the national average for 4 different categories of infections including: (1) infections in the blood, (2) MRSA infections, (3) C. diff. infections, and (4) sepsis infections after surgery.
- The Leapfrog Group provides many more detailed ratings of the quality of different types of care at this hospital. In the maternity category, the hospital was rated as having "achieved the standard" for high risk deliveries. However, the hospital was only rated as "some achievement" for Caesarian sections because the hospital's Caesarian section rate was 28.8% and the standard is that this rate should be below 23.6%.

== Financial Information ==
- St. Joseph's Regional Medical Center is a part of the St. Joseph Health System, which is designated as a 501(c)3 non-profit organization. According to propublica.org the organization had $966M in revenue and $941M in expenses in 2022. The organization's tax filings also indicate that it had $1.08B in assets in 2022 and $737M in liabilities.

== See also ==
- Barnert Hospital
- List of tallest buildings in Paterson
- St. Joseph's Health Website
