= Bergen Community College =

Public college in Bergen County, New Jersey, US

- Type: Public community college
- Established: 1965; 61 years ago
- Endowment: $5.97 million (2016)
- President: Eric M. Friedman
- Students: 13,352 degree-seeking, 5,800 others
- Location: Bergen County, New Jersey, United States; 40.9516°N 74.0883°W
- Campus: Paramus (Main) Hackensack Lyndhurst
- Colors: Pantone Purple; Pantone Orange 021
- Nickname: Bulldogs
- Website: bergen.edu

Bergen Community College is a public community college in Bergen County, New Jersey. It was founded in 1965 and opened in 1968. As of November 2021, it is the largest community college in the state, with campuses in Paramus (main campus), Hackensack (Ciarco Learning Center), and Lyndhurst (Bergen at the Meadowlands) and 13,352 students enrolled in degree programs, as well as approximately 5,800 in continuing and adult education programs. Federal data rank Bergen graduates first in earning the highest salaries among their peers from the state's 19 two-year institutions, and even out-earning peers from some four-year colleges. Bergen has graduated more than half a million students with associate degrees and certificates since its founding in 1968.

Bergen Community College is accredited by the Middle States Association of Colleges and Schools. Individual programs are accredited by the Commission on Accreditation of Allied Health Education Programs, the National League for Nursing, the American Dental Association, the Joint Review Committee on Education in Radiologic Technology, The National Accrediting Agency for Clinical Laboratory Services, and the American Physical Therapy Association. The Paralegal Studies program and the Legal Nurse Consultant program are approved by the American Bar Association.

== Paramus campus ==
The college's Paramus main campus includes the Technology Education Center (opened 2003), the Health Professions Integrated Teaching Center (opened 2016) and the STEM Student Research Center (opened 2019).

== Athletics ==
BCC is a member of the National Junior College Athletic Association in Region XIX (New Jersey, Delaware, Pennsylvania) and of the Garden State Athletic Conference. The college participates in the following intercollegiate sports:

- Fall: men's cross country; women's cross country; men's soccer; women's soccer; volleyball
- Winter: men's basketball; women's basketball; wrestling
- Spring: baseball; softball; men's track and field; women's track and field

== Free speech controversy ==
In 2014, after Francis Schmidt, a tenured professor, filed a grievance over denial of sabbatical leave, the college suspended him for eight days and required him to consult a psychiatrist before returning to campus, claiming that a photo he posted to social media of his seven-year-old-daughter wearing a t-shirt quoting Game of Thrones character Daenerys Targaryen could be construed as a threat of violence against college officials. The college faculty cited the incident as a factor in a vote of "no confidence" in college president Kaye Walter. The suspension was rescinded, with Schmidt receiving back pay for the suspension period, and a college spokesman acknowledged to Schmidt that "By sanctioning you as it did, BCC may have unintentionally erred and potentially violated your constitutional rights, including under the First Amendment to the U.S. Constitution". The Jefferson Center for the Protection of Free Expression conferred one of its annual Jefferson Muzzle Awards for "the past year's most outrageous and ridiculous affronts to free speech and press" on the college administration, declaring that it had "demonstrat[ed] its collective cluelessness on two distinct levels".

== Notable alumni ==
- Daisy Fuentes (born 1966), television host, comedian and model
- Mike Laga (born 1960), former professional baseball player for the Detroit Tigers, St. Louis Cardinals and San Francisco Giants in the 1980s and 1990s
- Dennis McNerney, politician who served as the County Executive of Bergen County from 2003 to 2011
- Liv Morgan (born 1994), professional wrestler and multi-time champion in the WWE
- Vincent Prieto (born 1960), politician who represented the 32nd Legislative District in the New Jersey General Assembly from 2004 to 2018 and served as the 170th Speaker of the Assembly
- Kyle Scatliffe (born 1986), stage actor best known for playing Enjolras in the 2014 Broadway revival of Les Misérables and Harpo in the 2015 Broadway Revival of The Color Purple
