= Paramus Park =

Shopping mall in Paramus, New Jersey, U.S.

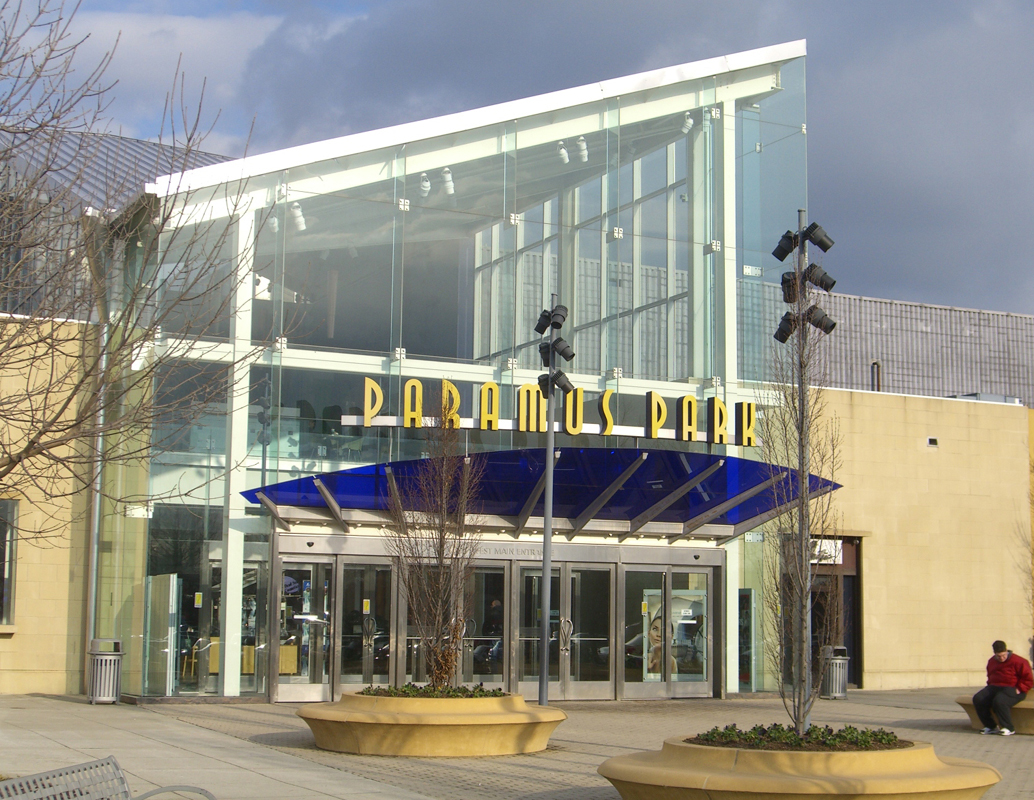
- Main entrance (January 2009)
- Location: Paramus, New Jersey, U.S.
- Coordinates: 40.957656°N 74.070214°W
- Address: 700 Paramus Park
- Opened: March 14, 1974; 52 years ago
- Renovated: 1999; 2002
- Developer: The Rouse Company; Federated Stores Realty; Connecticut General Life Insurance Company
- Manager: Centennial Real Estate Management
- Owner: Centennial Real Estate Management
- Architect: RTKL Associates
- Num. of stores: 70+ (120+ at peak)
- Num. of anchor tenants: 2
- Floor area: 770,941 sq ft (71,622.8 m^{2})
- Floors: 2
- Parking: Parking lot with 4,500 free spaces (as of 2016)
- Public transit: NJ Transit bus: 168, 722, 752, 758, 762
- Website: www.paramuspark.com

Paramus Park is a shopping mall located in Paramus, New Jersey, United States. It was developed via a joint venture by The Rouse Company, Federated Stores Realty and the Connecticut General Life Insurance Company (now The Cigna Group) through subsidiaries Paramus Park, Inc. and Congen Properties, Inc.

It opened in March 1974, is owned and managed by Centennial Real Estate Management as of June 2026, and has a gross leasable area (GLA) of 770,941 sq ft (71,622.8 m^{2}). The previous operator was GGP, a subsidiary of Brookfield Properties until June 2026.

== Overview ==
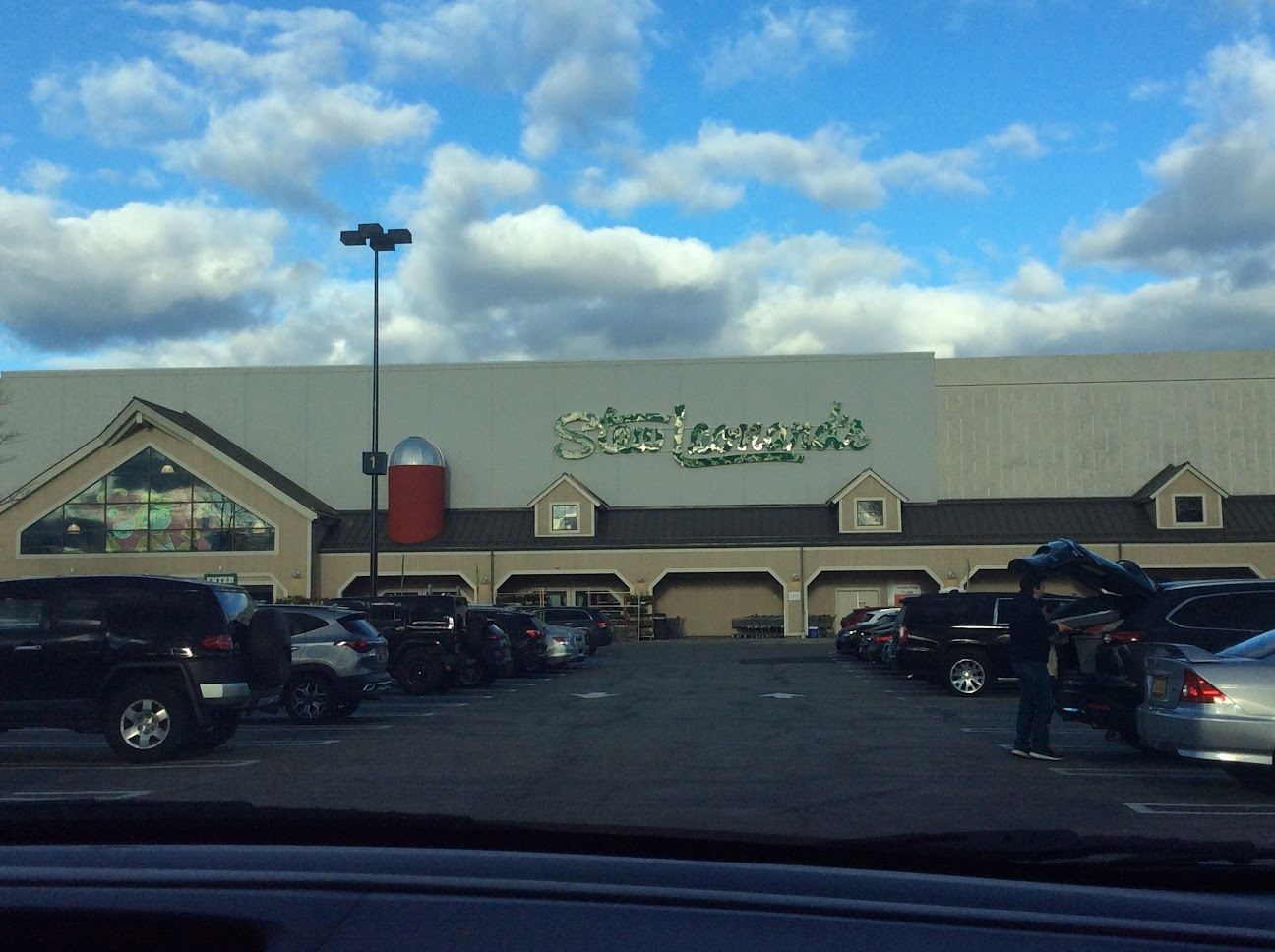
The Stew Leonard's location at the mall's south wing, which replaced Sears after it closed in 2018

Paramus Park is located on a plot of land between the northbound lanes of Route 17 and the southbound lanes of the Garden State Parkway, approximately 2 miles (3.2 km) from the interchanges of both highways with Route 4. It is accessible from the northbound Garden State Parkway at exit 163 and at exit 165 in both directions. An entrance to the southbound lanes is located in the mall's rear parking lot. Access off of NJ 17 is available on two access roads.

At 767,000 square feet (71,300 m^{2}) and with about 100 stores, Paramus Park, compared to the larger Garden State Plaza (which is three times its size), is a more regional, destination-oriented mall, with a higher-than-average sales per square foot, estimated by industry experts to be between $400 and $500 per square foot ($4,300 and $5,400/m^{2}) or more. In addition to attracting upscale shoppers and tenants, its smaller stores, lower congestion and location along the Garden State Parkway in an affluent area attracted shoppers responding to the Great Recession of 2007-2009, according to a 2011 NorthJersey.com report. By 2016, estimates were that the mall had tenants for 97 percent of the stores and was bringing in $430 per square foot ($4,600/m^{2}) in sales.

The four major malls in the borough—Garden State Plaza (opened in 1957), Bergen Town Center (also 1957), Fashion Center (opened in 1967) and Paramus Park—account for a major portion of the $6 billion in annual retail sales generated in Paramus, more than any other ZIP Code in the United States. Paramus Park gets 6 million visitors annually to its 107 stores. Located in Bergen County, the mall is subject both to the state Blue laws that apply to the entire county by referendum and the borough's stricter ordinance, which require them to be closed on Sundays. Stew Leonard's, Club Pilates, Atlantic Health System Urgent Care and Glitter and Glam Spa are the only businesses open on Sundays.

== History ==
Paramus Park was initially one of three enclosed malls in Paramus at the time of its construction. The Fashion Center, which is located near Paramus Park along Route 17, was the first built specifically as a strictly-indoor facility and opened in 1967. The Bergen Mall, located on Route 4 and built in 1957, became the second when the former outdoor mall was enclosed in 1973. (At the time Garden State Plaza, built in 1957, was still an outdoor mall; it completed its conversion to an enclosed mall in 1984.) Paramus Park remains one of three indoor malls in Paramus; the Fashion Center and The Shoppes on IV, the latter constructed after Paramus Park was built, were converted into outdoor shopping plazas.

=== Pre-construction and development ===
The genesis of the mall dates back to efforts by A&S in mid-1966 to identify a site for a location in Bergen County. From 1969 to 1971, Federated Department Stores and The Rouse Company, which had been selected to develop the mall, acquired land for the mall itself, as well as to create a bridge connecting the site to Route 17. Federated founded its real-estate development arm Federated Stores Realty in 1972, and this would be one of their first malls, albeit jointly developed with Rouse.

The Rouse Company and Federated Stores Realty formed the subsidiary Paramus Park, Inc. and partnered with Congen Properties, Inc., the real-estate arm of the Connecticut General Life Insurance Company (now The Cigna Group), which would develop, own, and manage the mall. RTKL Associates were the architects of the complex. By 1971, a series of lots covering 64 acres (26 ha) was assembled and the wetlands were drained by October 1972 to create a site for the construction to begin.

The mall opened on March 14, 1974, with a 300,000 sq ft (28,000 m^{2}) Abraham & Straus (since turned into a Macy's store) and Sears (which did not open until August) as anchors and space for 120 specialty stores. The Paramus High School Marching Band played at the grand opening.

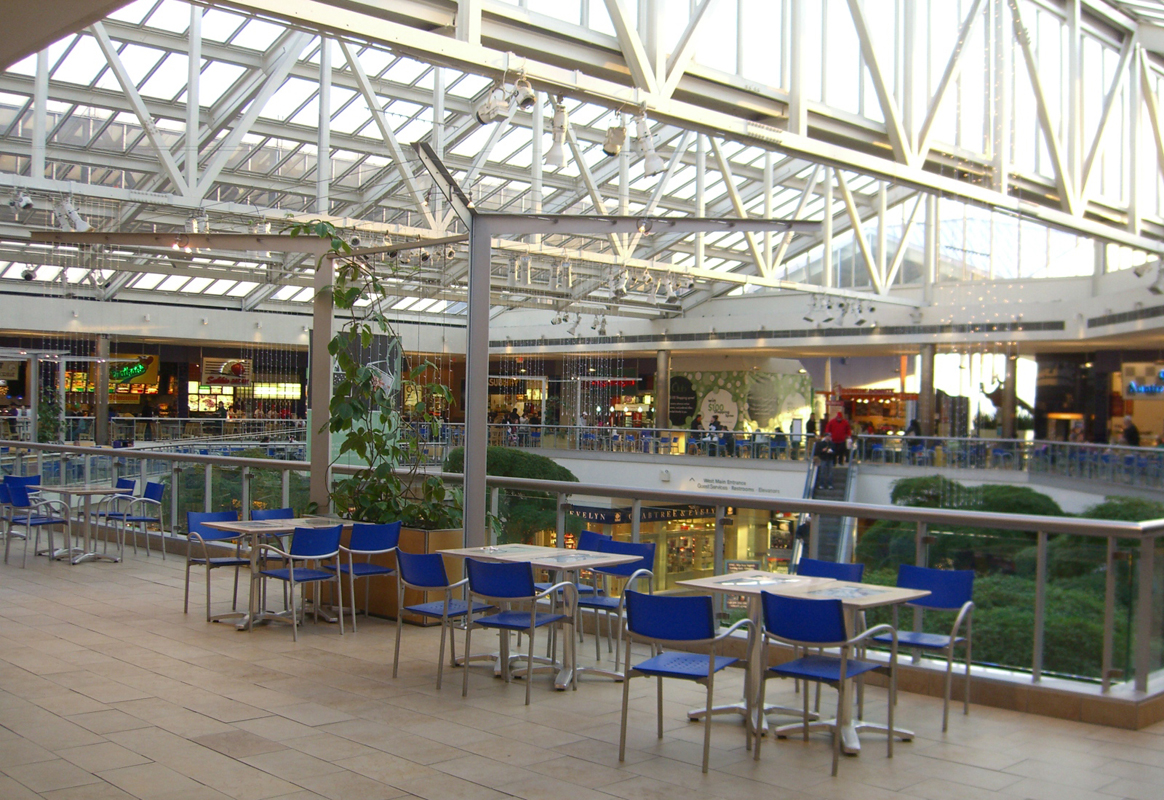
The second-floor food court, as seen in 2009

The mall's second-floor food court was an innovation, and is now credited as the first successful shopping mall food court in the United States following The Rouse Company's Gourmet Fair food court for Sherway Gardens in Canada in 1971, which was credited as the first successful food court for North America, and a failed attempt with Plymouth Meeting Mall in 1968 in Plymouth Meeting, Pennsylvania. A Fortunoff opened at the store in 1977, the chain's first location in New Jersey.

The mall is shaped as a four-legged zigzag, with an anchor store at each end and the mezzanine-level food court encircling an atrium which featured 6,000 US gallons (23,000 L; 5,000 imp gal) of water flowing each minute over a 30-foot (9.1 m) terraced waterfall surrounded by vegetation and punctuated by a pair of escalators; claimed to be the nation's second largest, tens of thousands of coins were tossed into the artificial waterfall, with nearly $3,500 collected in the mall's first year. In its first 25 years, some 12 million coins had been collected from the waterfall, with an average of $400 per month donated from the proceeds to charitable organizations in the area.

=== After opening ===
A stairway and a glass elevator surrounded by terraced gardens rounded out the access points to the second level food court until 1999 when it was demolished due to long lines, and replaced by two new elevators which were relocated. The food court has been very popular at the lunch hour with the area office workers. The garden-like design was prevalent throughout the rest of the mall. Trees lined the main promenade of the mall, along with park benches; all under large skylights. Two small courtyards were at the other leg intersections; one hosted a carousel and the other a lowered seating area with a bronze statue of a turkey, standing 10 feet (3.0 m) in height. The turkey statue was inspired by the name of the town from which the mall gets its name. Paramus comes from the Lenni Lenape Native American word meaning "land of the wild turkey" or "place of fertile soil". The last carousel was installed during the 1990s. A carousel was installed in 1976 to replace a play area that was considered dangerous and was the site of a number of child injuries and was removed after 37 years in August 2013 so that the mall could use that space for other purposes.

Paramus Park is mentioned in the lyrics of the 1977 Dean Friedman song "Ariel". The two characters in the song were "standing by the waterfall at Paramus Park".

In 1986, Paramus Park was the site of an innovative McDonald's restaurant in its food court, which featured a décor with oak trim, pastel tiles and marble counters, in lieu of the traditional plastic interior in primary colors. The facility cost $650,000 to construct, 40% more than a typical McDonald's and was designed to create more of the feel of an upscale restaurant. Closed in 2000, it was replaced by a walk-up. The McDonald's location closed in the 2013 and was replaced by a Burger King. Restrooms are now located in its former location. A Claire's store was opened in 1988 and closed in 2006.

Hanson's 1997 video "Tulsa, Tokyo & the Middle of Nowhere", features the band traveling to Paramus Park on May 7, 1997, performing in the food court in front of over 6,000 screaming fans; the performance had been promoted by radio station WHTZ, which had anticipated a crowd numbering in the hundreds, not the thousands who showed up. The performance was Hanson's first public appearance after the release of "MMMBop".

In 2004, General Growth Properties acquired The Rouse Co., which owned Paramus Park, as well as other malls in the state, including Willowbrook in Wayne and Woodbridge Center in Woodbridge Township.

=== 2005 fire ===
In 2005, Paramus Park Mall suffered an electrical fire, filling the facility with heavy smoke and soot. The mall's automatic fire sprinkler system, however, did not activate, as the fire was in an electrical room and was not direct in the main mall areas. Several stores closed temporarily for cleanup.

During the Great Recession of 2007-2009, the mall's smaller stores, historical lower congestion and location along the Garden State Parkway in an affluent area attracted upscale shoppers and tenants that had previously shifted away from smaller malls in lieu of the larger ones in the area, such as Westfield Garden State Plaza, according to a 2011 NorthJersey.com report.

The mall received approval in 2008 for a new 88,650-square-foot (8,236 m^{2}) lifestyle center on the west side of the mall, which would have more of a "main street" feel for shoppers.

In 2011, the Foot Locker complex store was closed as L.L. Bean decided to begin leasing the space. The store opened in November 2011.

In May 2013, following a unanimous vote from the local zoning board, plans began to construct a 13-screen movie theater on 88,000 square feet (8,200 m^{2}) of space to be added the west side of the mall, attached to the food court. This would have been a Regal Cinemas movie theater.

In October 2017, it was reported that the Sears department store that had served as an anchor store since the mall opened in 1974 would be replaced by a Stew Leonard's supermarket on the first floor and a 12-screen Regal Cinemas theater on the second floor. On December 7, mall representatives appeared at a public hearing to request approval by zoning officials to convert the aging Sears department store into a Stew Leonard's supermarket and movie theater. By 2019, NJ.com said that the completed 80,000-square-foot (7,400 m^{2}) supermarket, the first one built by Stew Leonard's in New Jersey, had "transformed Paramus Park Mall into a different kind of destination" by providing a new option for grocery shoppers. Plans for a movie theater have since been cancelled.

In 2018, Uniqlo announced that it would open a 13,000-square-foot (1,200 m^{2}) store at the mall after moving from Garden State Plaza.

In 2018, owner and manager of the mall GGP Inc. was acquired by Brookfield Properties.

In January 2026, Brookfield Properties reverted its retail division back to GGP.

In June 2026, Centennial Real Estate took over third-party management of the mall.
