= Willowbrook Mall (New Jersey) =

Shopping mall in Passaic County, New Jersey, U.S.

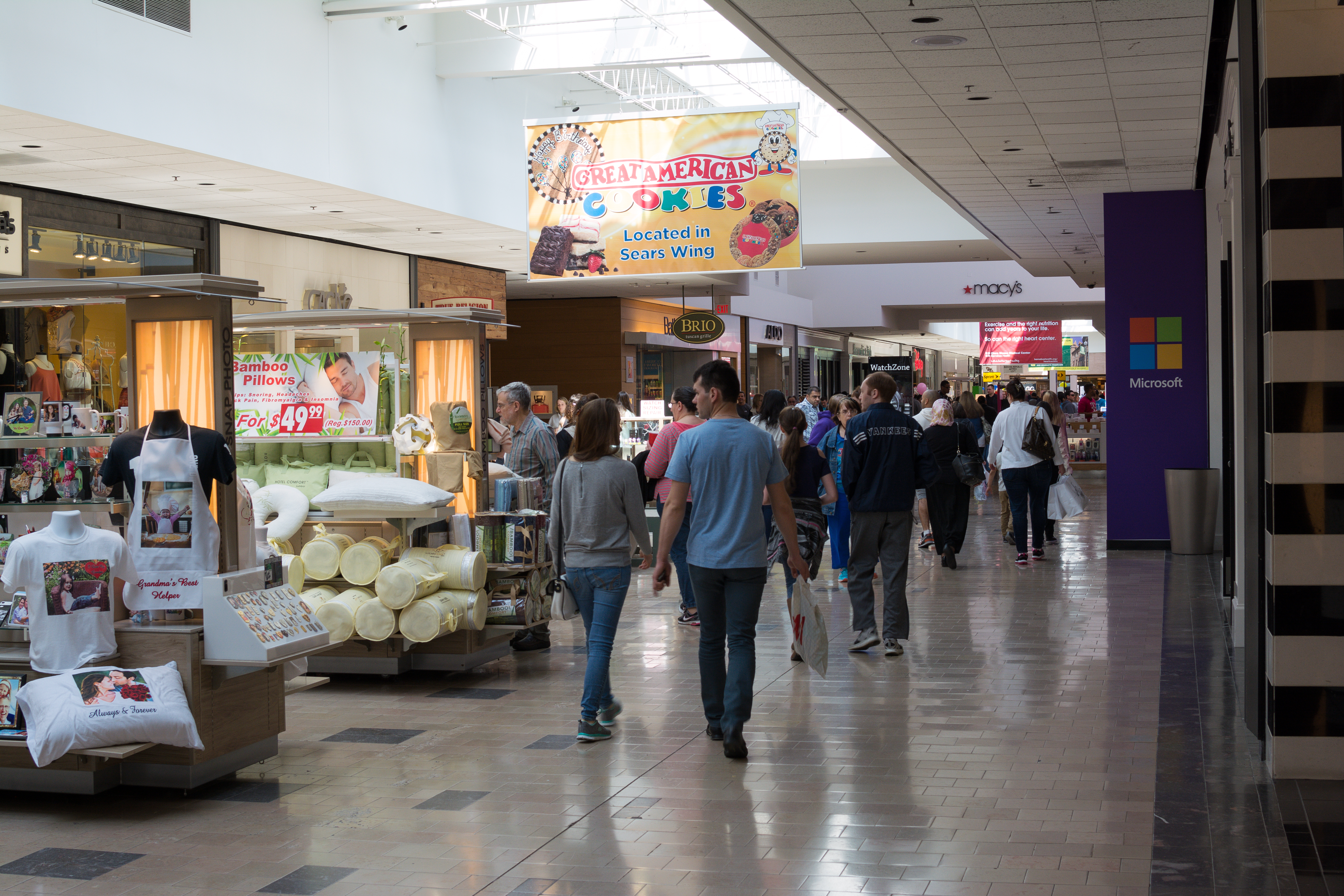
- Interior view (April 2015)
- Location: Wayne, New Jersey, United States
- Coordinates: 40.889°N 74.260°W
- Address: 1400 Willowbrook Mall
- Opened: September 24, 1969; 57 years ago (expanded August 12, 1970)
- Renovated: 1970; 1988; 2006; 2015–2016
- Developer: The Rouse Company
- Manager: GGP
- Owner: GGP
- Num. of stores: 130+
- Num. of anchor tenants: 4
- Floor area: 1,520,000 sq ft (141,000 m^{2})
- Floors: 1 (with partial second floor)
- Parking: Parking lot with 8,000 spaces
- Public transit: NJ Transit Bus: 11, 28 (weekends only), 191, 193, 194, 195, 197, 198, 704, 705, 712, 748, 871, 874
- Website: willowbrook-mall.com
- Building details

Renovating team
- Renovating firm: General Growth Properties

Willowbrook Mall (or simply Willowbrook) is a one-level shopping center with a partial second floor located in Wayne, New Jersey. It is near the intersection of Route 23, U.S. Route 46, and Interstate 80 in the New York metropolitan area and is situated close to both Essex and Morris counties near the Passaic River. The mall features more than 165 retail establishments and a gross leasable area of 1,518,006 square feet (141,027.4 m^{2}). The mall opened in 1969 and was expanded in 1970, renovated in 1988, 2006, and 2015.

As of 2026, Willowbrook's four anchor stores are Macy's, which through its former subsidiary Bamberger's has been in the mall since its opening; Bloomingdale's, which opened in 2002; BJ's Wholesale Club, which opened in 2022; and JCPenney, which opened in 2024. Bloomingdale's took over the former Stern's location that opened in 1968 and was one of two that were not converted to Macy's stores after its parent, Federated Department Stores, retired the brand in 2001. BJ's opened in the anchor space that Sears vacated when the store was closed in that company's massive downsizing. JCPenney had been an anchor of the neighboring Wayne Towne Center since it had opened, and eventually moved into the final anchor space where Ohrbach's, Steinbach, and Lord & Taylor had occupied.

The mall also features a 14-screen Cinemark movie theater, which is located in the rear parking lot adjacent to BJ's auto center.

With blue laws in effect in neighboring Bergen County and even stricter restrictions in effect in Paramus, Willowbrook Mall has benefited from the spillover of shoppers on Sunday. The mall and its surrounding access roads and parking areas are prone to flooding in rainstorms. The Pompton River flows near the mall and the Passaic River runs behind it.

== History ==
=== 1962–1968: Planning and construction ===
In 1962, Newark-based department store Bamberger's announced their plan to construct the Willowbrook Shopping Center on 100 acres (40 ha) of land beside Routes 80, 46, and 23.

The Rouse Company of Baltimore, who also constructed the Cherry Hill Mall and Woodbridge Center, headed the project. Department stores S. Klein, Sears, and Ohrbach's joined the project as anchor tenants, necessitating that the initial concept change "from a Y-shape to the mall’s current, cross-shaped form". Rouse founded the subsidiary Willowbrook Mall, Inc. for the mall development.

Construction of Willowbrook Mall began in 1966 with the groundbreaking of the Bamberger's store. In September 1968, The New York Times reported that department store Ohrbach's had begun construction on a two-floor, 100,000-square-foot store in the upcoming mall. That year, Sears also confirmed their new location.

The mall was originally planned as a 110-store indoor shopping mall, encompassing 1,500,000 square feet (140,000 m^{2}).

=== Opening and 20th century ===
Willowbrook Mall opened on September 24, 1969, with four main department stores and 70 other shops, including "Commonwealth Shoe & Leather Co., Custom Shirt Maker, Spencer Gifts, Sosin Jewelry, Merle Norman Cosmetics, and Belle Fashion Shoppes". Dining options were Bagel Shop, O’Dea’s Bar-B-Que Pit, and Molinari Meat Market. The mall also featured art exhibits and galleries.

A second phase opened on August 12, 1970, consisting of 47 specialty stores on two floors, and a Stern's department store. Upon the opening of Stern's, Willowbrook Mall became the largest enclosed shopping mall in the world, superseding its competitor, Garden State Plaza.

On October 15, Wayne mayor and state senator Edward Sisco opened The Four & Twenty at the Willowbrook Mall, a luxury restaurant with live piano and organ music. It was recommended by American Express as a The New Money cardholder destination the same year.

On October 17, the Willowbrook Cinema had its grand opening, featuring "a lobby decorated with potted trees, tiered lamps, and crystal chandeliers".

In 1984, the U.S. Coast Guard Auxiliary Division III hosted a three-day boating safety exhibit show with the vessel Blackjack. Wayne mayor Walter J. Jasinski cut the ceremonial ribbon. 5,000 visitors attended the show, and The Navigator magazine estimated that 50,000 cars passed by the Route 46 billboard for the event.

In 1993, as part of an effort to attract non-smokers, the Willowbrook Mall became one of the first malls in New Jersey to ban smoking on mall grounds. The Bamberger's store was rebranded as Macy's in September 1986 after its corporate parent decided to rebrand its entire northeastern United States operation under its namesake marque. Ohrbach's was converted as part of the Steinbach chain, which went out of business in 1996. The building was expanded for its new tenant Lord & Taylor, which opened in 1997.

=== 21st century ===
Stern's closed its doors in 2001 after its parent company, Federated Department Stores, retired the brand; the store was converted to its sister brand, Bloomingdale's, which opened on April 11, 2002.

In 2002, The Rouse Company reacquired Willowbrook from Urban Retail Properties/Rodamco North America following a joint venture with Simon Property Group and Westfield Group, and it reformed the subsidiary Willowbrook Mall, Inc., and related subsidiaries like The Willowbrook Company. Two years later, Rouse and its assets, including Willowbrook, was acquired by General Growth Properties (GGP).

In 2015, GGP announced that the mall would undergo a two-year, $23 million renovation. The renovation entailed new ceilings in the Sears and Macy's wings, an overhaul of the food court, new flooring throughout the mall, additional seating, and a two-story streetscape theme for the Bloomingdale's wing. In 2017, Sears opened an updated store format and subleased an unused space to Dave & Buster's, which opened on Valentine's Day 2018. Seritage shuttered and razed the Sears Auto Center for a Cinemark movie theater, becoming the second movie theater within the mall area limits (after a 14-screen AMC Theatres, formerly Loews Theatres). On July 15, 2019, Sears announced that it would shutter as part of an ongoing decision to eliminate their traditional brick-and-mortar format. In October 2020, it was announced that BJ's Wholesale Club would plan to open a warehouse store and gas station where the previous Sears outpost was with the gas station opening north of the mall's parking lot. The store opened in November 2022.

In August 2018, Macy's added a Macy's Backstage outlet in a portion of its store. In the same month saw owner and manager General Growth Properties was acquired by Brookfield Properties.

A P.F Chang's opened in a small space within the Bloomingdale's store on January 22, 2019.

In August 2020, Lord & Taylor announced that it would closed its location at Willowbrook Mall as part of its plans to shutter its traditional brick and mortar format due to the COVID-19 pandemic. Shopper's Find opened in Lord & Taylor's former anchor location in June 2021 and closed in early 2023. JCPenney, which had been an anchor at neighboring Wayne Towne Center since that mall's opening, moved to Willowbrook in the spring of 2024 to take over a space previously occupied by Ohrbach's, Steinbach, and Lord & Taylor.

BJ's Wholesale Club opened its Willowbrook outpost in late 2022 in a portion of the former Sears anchor, which had been downscaled and reconfigured before it was closed.

In January 2026, Brookfield Corporation rebranded the Brookfield Properties Retail Group division back to GGP Inc.

== Gallery ==
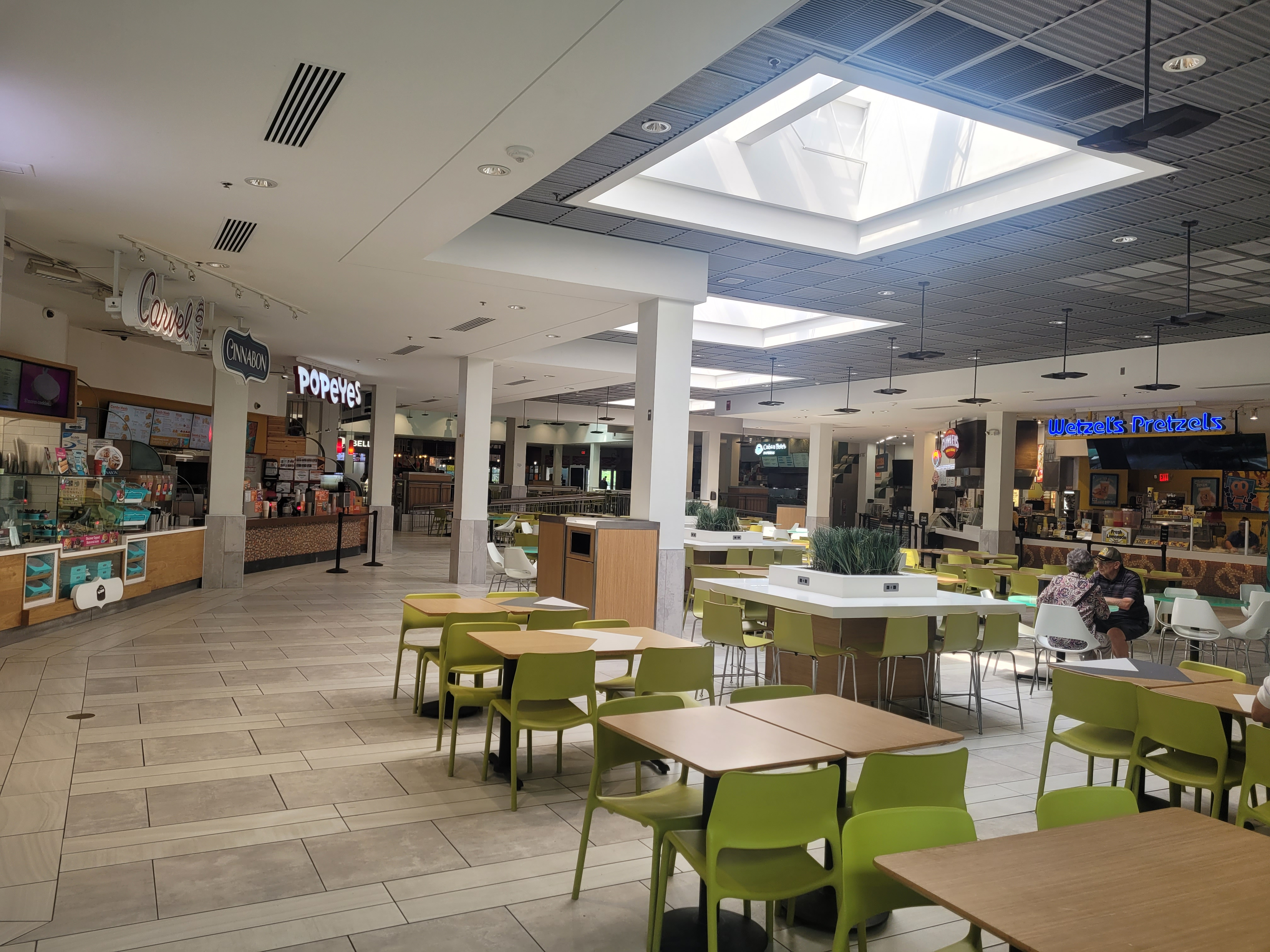
The Willowbrook Mall food court in 2024, with square skylight. Franchises visible include Carvel, Cinnabon, Popeyes, Charleys Cheesesteaks, and Wetzel's Pretzels.

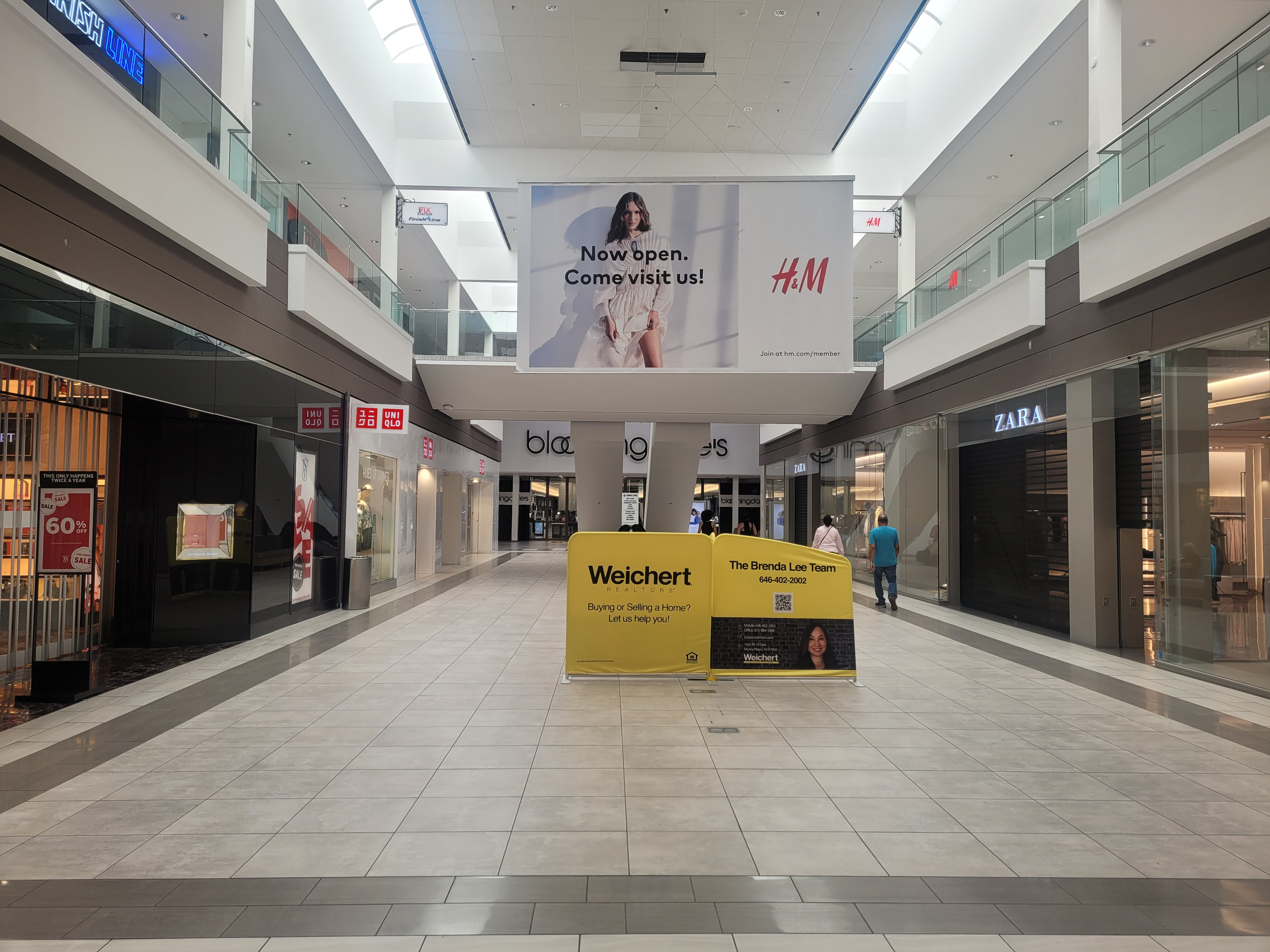
Interior hallway, 2024, with Uniqlo, Zara, and Bloomingdale's. An advertisement for H&M and Weichert, Realtors is central.

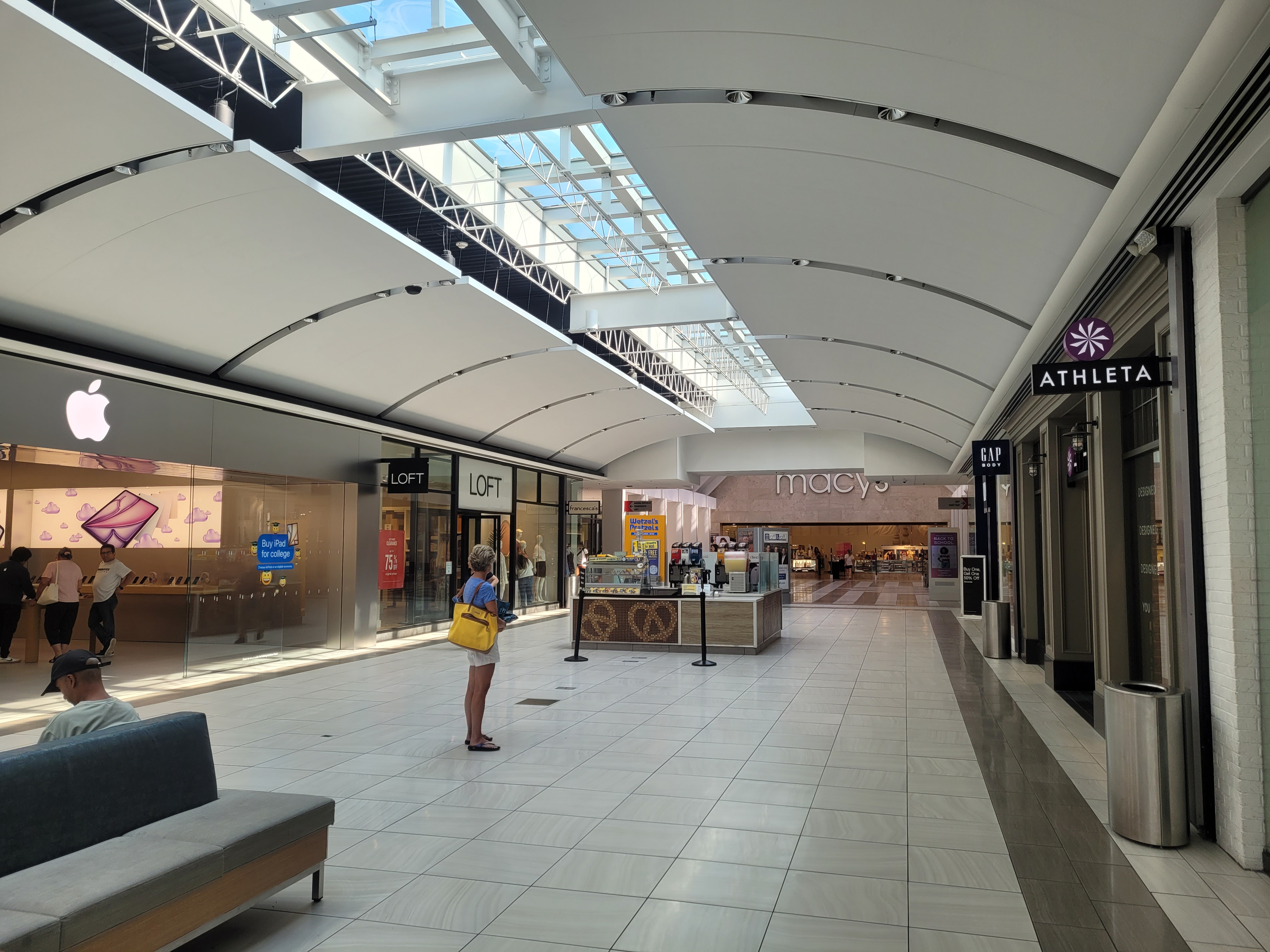
Interior hallway, 2025, showing an Apple Store, a Macy's, a Loft, a GAP, an Athleta and others.

== Public transportation ==
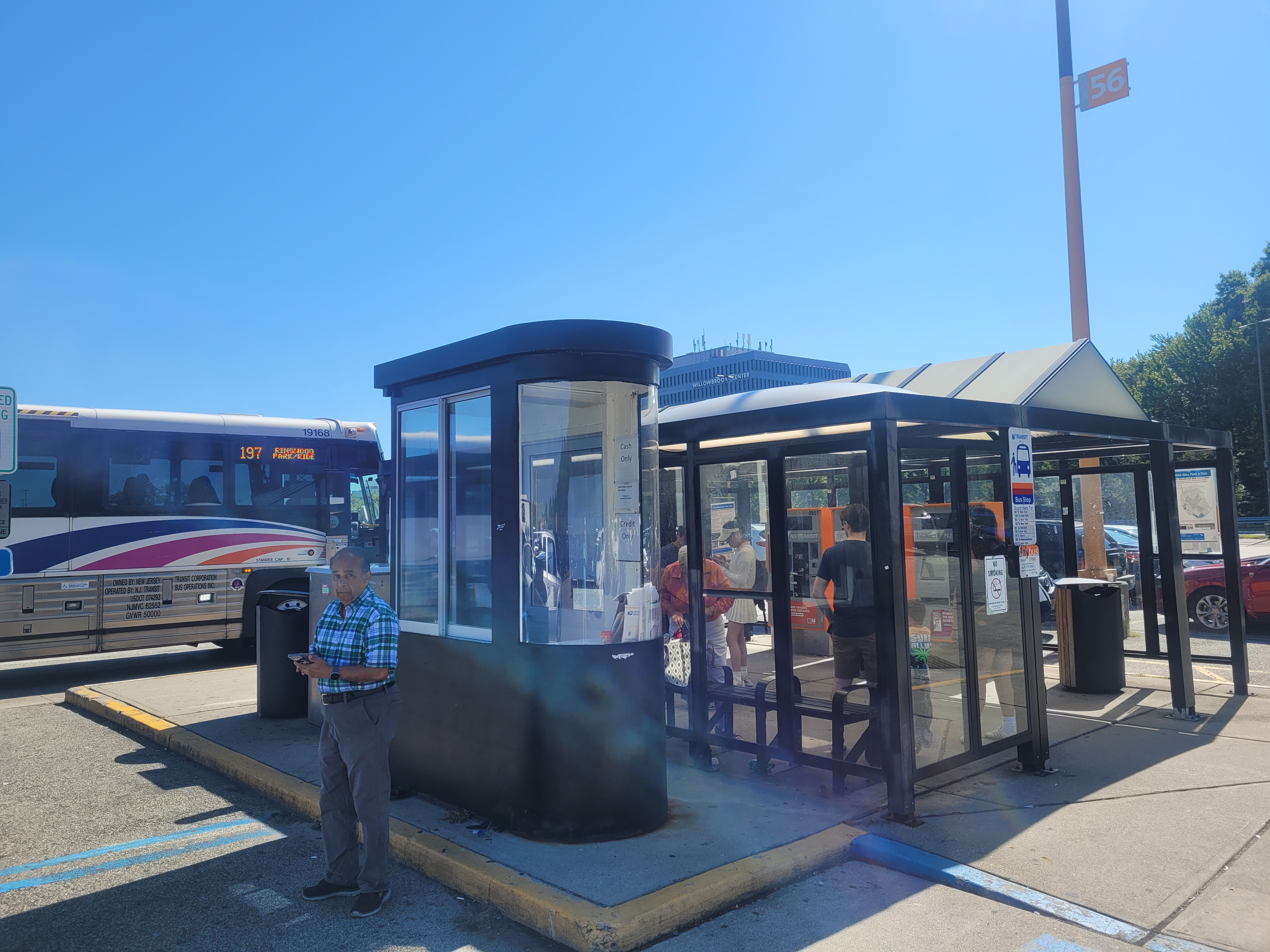
NJ Transit park & ride at the Willowbrook Mall, August 2025

The mall and its parking lots serve as a transportation hub for the surrounding area. An NJ Transit park and ride facility, opened in 1974, provides bus service to and from the Port Authority Bus Terminal in Midtown Manhattan. The 11, 28, 191, 193, 194, 195, 197, 198, 324, 704, 705, 712, 748, 871 and 874 buses serve the mall.

== In popular culture ==
In a 1970 issue of Life magazine, the Willowbrook Mall's Four and Twenty restaurant was advertised by American Express as a luxury culinary destination in the New York metropolitan area. The restaurant was compatible with its new Amex credit card, The New Money.

In 1991, the Willowbrook Mall was the site of the Nickelodeon comedy The Adventures of Pete & Pete special episode "What We Did on Our Summer Vacation", in which Ellen's photo booth was located in the parking lot of the mall.

The mall has also appeared in episodes of the truTV comedy series Impractical Jokers, where cast members filmed several hidden-camera challenges inside Willowbrook, in which unsuspecting shoppers became part of the improvisational pranks that the show is known for.

Principal photography for the 2009 film Paul Blart: Mall Cop took place at the Burlington Mall in Burlington, Massachusetts, after being denied permits to film at Willowbrook Mall.
