= Garden State Plaza =

Shopping mall in Paramus, New Jersey

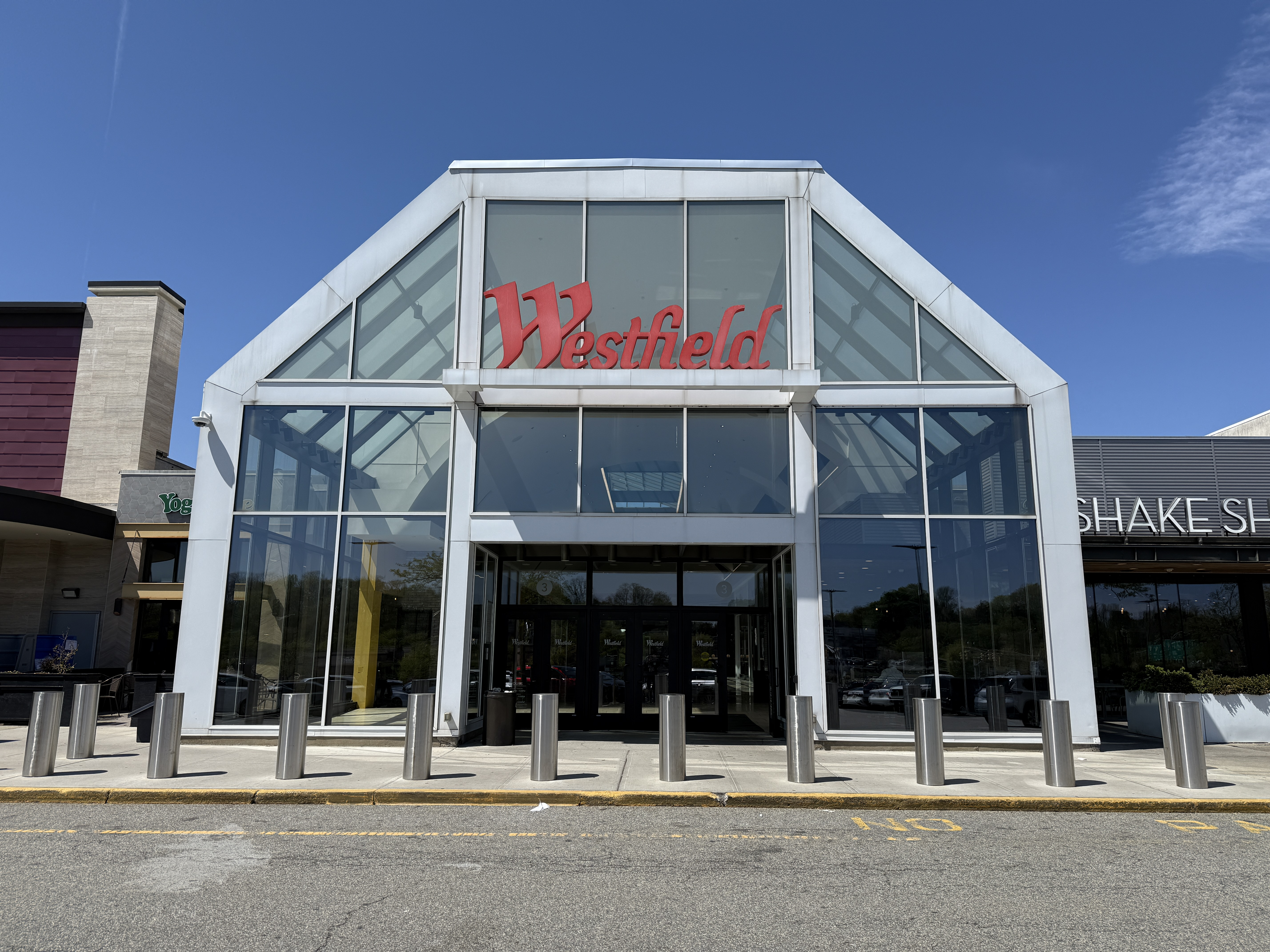
- Entrance to Garden State Plaza, 2026
- Location: Paramus, New Jersey
- Coordinates: 40.91896°N 74.07639°W
- Address: 1 Garden State Plaza
- Opened: May 1, 1957
- Developer: R.H. Macy & Co.
- Manager: Unibail-Rodamco-Westfield
- Owner: Unibail-Rodamco-Westfield
- Num. of stores: 300 (at peak)
- Num. of anchor tenants: 4
- Floor area: 2,118,718 ft^{2} (196,835.3 m^{2})
- Floors: 2 (3 in Macy's, Nordstrom, & Neiman Marcus)
- Parking: Parking lot, parking garage, and valet parking with 10,796 parking spaces.
- Public transit: NJ Transit bus: 163, 171, 175, 707, 709, 756, 758, 770
- Website: westfield.com/gardenstateplaza

Garden State Plaza (officially Westfield Garden State Plaza) is a shopping mall located in Paramus, Bergen County, in the U.S. state of New Jersey. Owned and managed by Paris-based real estate management company Unibail-Rodamco-Westfield, the mall is situated at the intersection of Route 4 and Route 17 near the Garden State Parkway, about 15 miles (24 km) west of the New York City borough of Manhattan. Opened in 1957 as the first suburban shopping mall in New Jersey, it has 300 stores and 2,118,718 sq ft (196,835.3 m^{2}) of leasable space, ranked in 2022 as the 16th-largest shopping mall in the United States and qualifying it as a super-regional mall according to the standards of the International Council of Shopping Centers.

The mall had sales of $775 per square foot in 2013, almost 75% above the national average. In a study of malls in the United States performed on behalf of CNBC, published in 2018, Garden State Plaza ranked ninth in the nation, based on sales of $950 per square foot. Most of the mall, especially retail outlets, is closed on Sunday in accordance with state and local blue laws. Since April 2023, minors under the age of 18 are required to have an adult over 21 supervise them on Friday and Saturday nights.

In a borough where half of the property tax revenue comes from retail properties, Garden State Plaza accounts for 10% of the property taxes collected in Paramus.

As of September 2026, the mall's anchors are Macy's, Nordstrom, Neiman Marcus, and AMC Theatres.

== History ==
The site at the southwest corner of Route 4 and Route 17 that would become Garden State Plaza was next to a drive-in theater dating back to the 1930s. Allied Stores and Macy's had discussed a shared project at the site that was abandoned in August 1953, after which Allied Stores pursued development of the Bergen Mall (since renamed as Bergen Town Center), that would be located a mile away on Route 4 and which was scheduled to open in September 1957 with Stern's as its anchor store.

R.H. Macy announced the creation of Garden State Plaza in May 1954, establishing a subsidiary that would own and operate the mall. JC Penney announced in June 1955 that the company would construct an 83,000-square-foot (7,700 m^{2}) standalone three-story building as part of the project, with the infrastructure to add a fourth floor, as needs grew. Constructed by the Muscarelle Construction Company for owner/developer R.H. Macy & Co. as an open-air shopping "plaza", total construction costs for the mall were $26 million (equivalent to $298,000,000 in 2025).

Garden State Plaza opened on May 1, 1957, as the first suburban mall in New Jersey, with plans to be "the largest in the state". On opening day, Garden State Plaza had 75,000 shoppers. The mall was anchored by a 340,000-square-foot (32,000 m^{2}) 3-story Bamberger's department store, along with 17 other retail stores and 5,500 parking spaces on a site that covered 110 acres (45 ha). The formal ribbon cutting ceremony included the mayor of Paramus Fred C. Galda and a local eight-year-old who cut a ribbon with one thousand dimes as a fundraiser for the National Foundation for Infantile Paralysis (since renamed as the March of Dimes), part of an awareness campaign to encourage people to get the polio vaccine.

Nineteen additional stores opened by that fall. Fifth Avenue women's clothing store Russeks opened a store in September 1957. Stage II of the mall opened in 1958, including JCPenney, Mack Drug, a Safeway grocery store, and Neisner's variety store. In September 1958, long-time Macy's rival Gimbel's acquired a building site in the mall for a 240,000 square feet (22,000 m^{2}) 3-story anchor store, which was completed in 1960. It was called "the largest shopping center in the world."

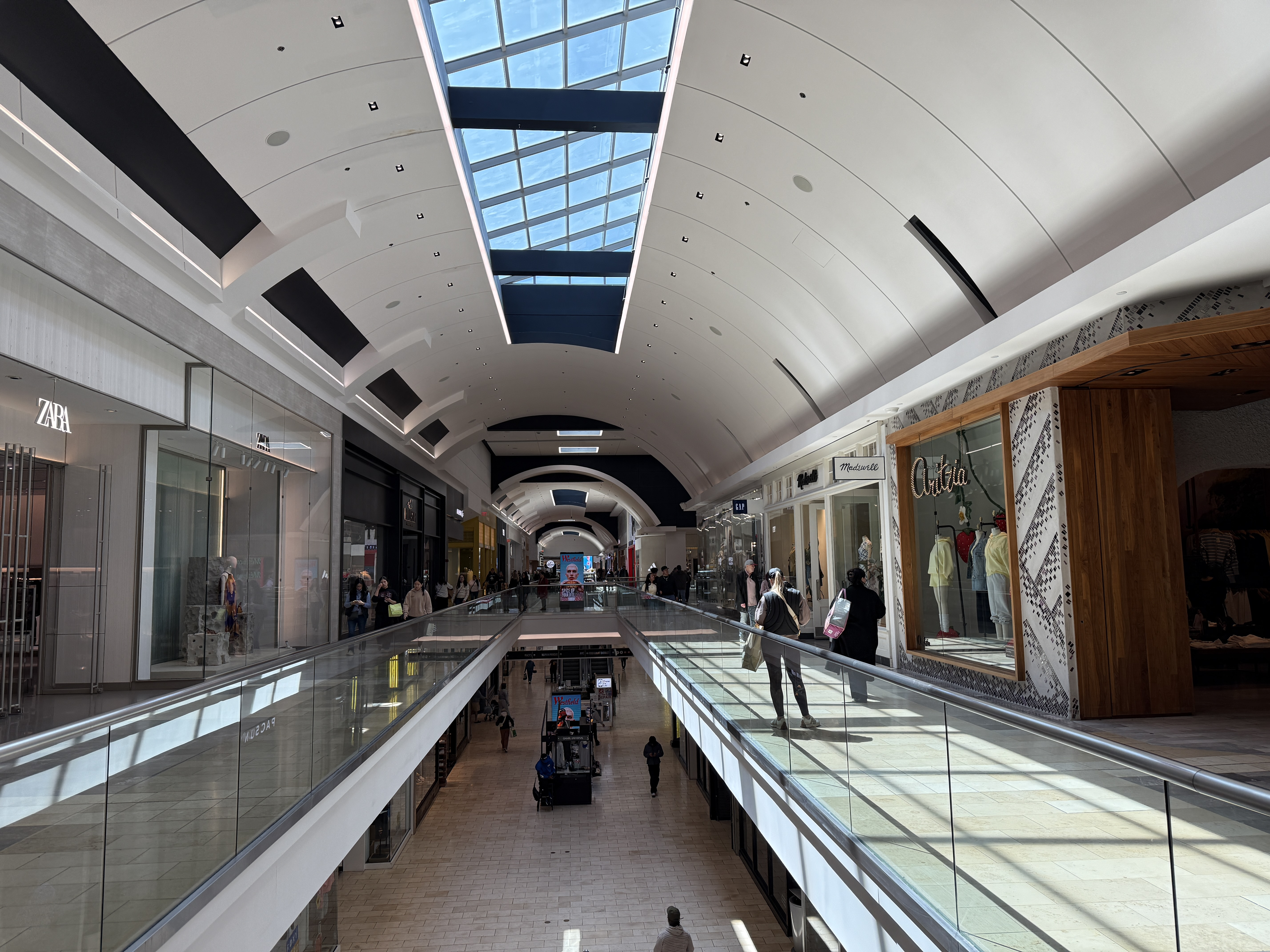
Interior of Garden State Plaza near Nordstrom

Garden State Plaza drew much business from nearby New York towns and cities, whose shoppers wandered across state lines to take advantage of New Jersey's lower sales taxes and its policy that exempted clothing purchases from sales tax. By 1961, it was the world's largest mall.

In 1975, the mall began a multi-phased, years-long project that would fully enclose the mall, converting exterior passageways into covered spaces. The project, budgeted at $20 million, would add 400,000 square feet (37,000 m^{2}) of retail space, bringing the total to 1,757,000 square feet (163,200 m^{2}) upon completion.

A $21 million construction project in 1981 converted access tunnels into a second level for the mall, added 150,000 square feet (14,000 m^{2}) of retail space.

The mall was enclosed between 1981 and 1984 in response to competitive pressure from newer fully enclosed malls such as the Willowbrook Mall in nearby Wayne. Later in the 1980s, a lower level was added by converting a former basement truck tunnel into retail space. The existing JCPenney basement was given a new entrance on the lower level, but since the floors were at slightly different elevations, that entrance features the shortest escalator in North America, at a height of six steps.

In 1987, Gimbels' parent company, BATUS, which had been selling off its Gimbels' stores, sold its Garden State Plaza location to Associated Dry Goods. Associated reopened the store as the new headquarters for its Hahne's department stores. Hahne's had previously been headquartered at its flagship store in downtown Newark, which the company wanted to close. In the mid-1990s, a Nobody Beats the Wiz store was added as an out-parcel to the mall site; it later became a Best Buy store that closed in 2018. The site was then occupied by a toy store called Toy City, owned by Party City.

On September 7, 1990, Nordstrom opened a $37 million, 272,000 sq ft (25,300 m^{2}), three-level store constructed on the former Gimbel's/Hahne's site. In 1991, the luxury department store chain Lord & Taylor opened a store in the mall, which was its seventh in the state at the time.

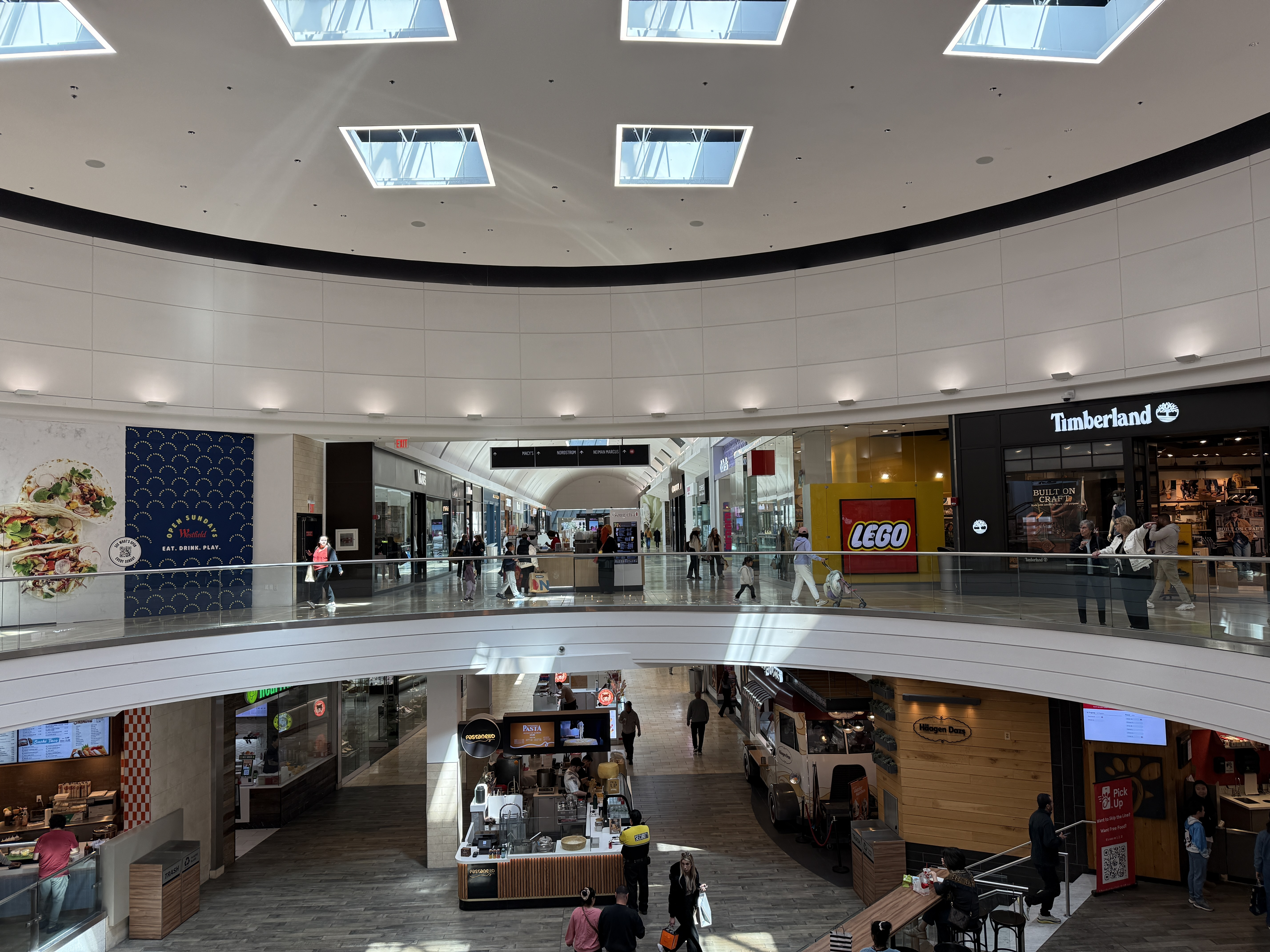
Garden State Plaza in 2026, taken from second level above mall's food court

In 1996, Garden State Plaza completed a $200 million expansion and major remodeling project that added more than 700,000 sq ft (65,000 m^{2}) of retail space and a pair of four-level parking structures, Parking Garage A, and Parking Garage B. The downstairs food court was connected to the lower level from the previous expansion. JCPenney grew by 62,000 to 150,000 sq ft (5,800 to 13,900 m^{2}), and two new anchors were added, a 150,000 sq ft (14,000 m^{2}) Neiman Marcus on three levels and a 135,000 sq ft (12,500 m^{2}) Lord & Taylor on two levels, both targeted at the upscale fashion-conscious shopper. A Venetian carousel was also added at that time of the expansion and remodeling and was located in front of Macy's. The carousel closed in 2016, and was removed so that the mall could use that space for performances by the Bergen Performing Arts Center.

Westfield acquired the mall in 1986 from Macy's in a deal that also included New Jersey's Brunswick Square Mall and Quaker Bridge Mall.

The Borough of Paramus petitioned the New Jersey Supreme Court to review a decision by borough's Planning Board, asking it to review the plans to construct a 163,000-square-foot (15,100 m^{2}) "entertainment lifestyle precinct" at the mall that included a 16-screen AMC movie theater and 10 specialty retail stores, along with a 158,000-square-foot (14,700 m^{2}) parking lot below the new wing, known as "Parking Garage C". The petition was turned down, and the mall celebrated its 50th anniversary with the new expansion and stores opened on May 25, 2007.

In 2013, the mall rebuilt Parking Garage B, expanding it to five levels and 1,800 parking spaces. Adjacent were built a new guest services office and a valet lounge. A year later, the mall added a 55,000 square feet (5,100 m^{2}) wing at a cost of $160 million known as the "Fashion District" that has 22 stores and restaurants.

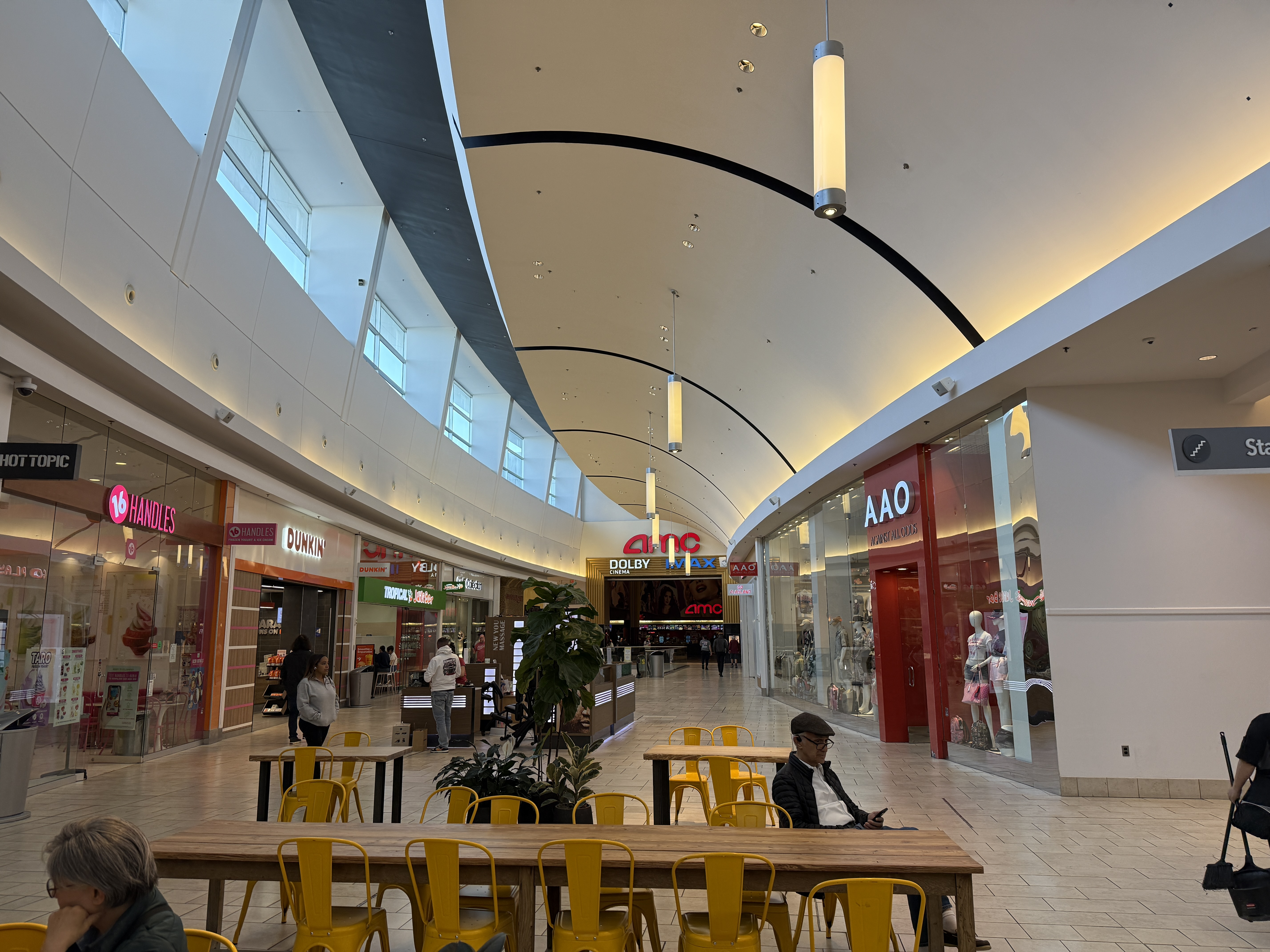
Garden State Plaza near AMC Theatres

In January 2018, Best Buy announced that they would be shuttering their two-level store at Garden State Plaza and would be relocating to a single-floor building to be constructed at The Outlets at Bergen Town Center nearby. The store officially moved on April 14, 2018. JCPenney closed in March 2018. The JCPenney anchor space was subdivided for multiple tenants, including Lululemon, Adidas, Under Armour, Old Navy, Champs Sports, Arena STEM (now Power Up Arena), Planet Playskool, and Nerf Action Xperience.

In July 2019, Tru Kids announced that one of two Toys "R" Us stores being opened by that company as part of that toy retailer's recovery from Chapter 11 bankruptcy in 2017 and its acquisition by Tru Kids, would be at Garden State Plaza. (The other would be opened at The Galleria in Houston.) Eschewing the "warehouse" arrangement of previous stores, Toys "R" Us stores, these revamped versions were much smaller, and centered around open play areas, interactive displays and areas for special events and birthday parties. It opened on November 27, 2019. However it closed on January 28, 2021.

In September 2019, the mall announced that it would developing mixed-use projects with dining and other retail on the ground floors of the buildings and housing on the upper floors, which would be constructed in areas now covered by parking lots on the periphery of the mall. Construction of this housing would count toward the borough's affordable housing obligations and serve as a downtown "town square" for Paramus. As of November 2025, construction is expected to begin in early 2026, with the first phase of the development to be completed by the end of 2027.

In August 2020, Lord & Taylor announced that its location in Garden State Plaza would be one of six remaining stores in the state that would be closed, as part of an overall shutdown of the chain's retail operations.

In April 2023, the mall announced it would closely align with similar policies adopted by many other malls nationally, banning visitors under 18 without a parent or guardian from the building on weekends, effective the end of that month (except for its AMC location and onsite restaurants, leading some local residents to question the effectiveness of the policy).

In March 2026, Level99, an entertainment complex featuring interactive challenge rooms, announced plans to open in 2027 at the mall. The center will be the first in New Jersey and the URW portfolio.

== Blue laws ==
Due to New Jersey state blue laws that only apply in Bergen County and more restrictive limitations in place in Paramus restricting business on Sunday, Garden State Plaza is almost completely closed on Sundays, except for some of the restaurants and the movie theater, all of which have special Sunday entrances. On Sundays, Garden State Plaza's parking lot is accessible only from the Route 4 and Route 17 access points. Gates are down so that the access roads from the secondary streets are blocked. The Paramus Borough Code forbids the performance of any "worldly employment" on Sunday, with very limited exceptions. These laws were enacted shortly after Garden State Plaza opened, out of fear that the mall would cause high levels of traffic congestion on the highways in the borough. During the aftermath of Hurricane Sandy, Governor of New Jersey Chris Christie issued an executive order that suspended the state's blue laws, allowing stores to be open on Sunday, November 4, 2012, for the benefit of those severely affected by flooding and/or power outages caused by the hurricane. A week later, after public outcry that included the mayor of Paramus announcing that the borough would continue to enforce its own restrictions, the state's blue laws were put back into effect.

== Public transportation ==
Westfield Garden State Plaza serves as a local transportation hub. The mall is served by NJ Transit bus lines routes 163, 171, 175, 707, 709, 756, 758 and 770.

== Amenities ==
Garden State Plaza offers visitor services including valet parking, electric vehicle charging stations, complimentary Wi-Fi, stroller rentals, wheelchair and mobility scooter services, and family lounge facilities with private nursing areas.

== Incidents ==
On November 4, 2013, 20-year-old Richard Shoop, armed with a SIG 556R semi-automatic rifle, fired multiple shots in the mall. Customers and employees were evacuated immediately from the mall premises shortly after the shots were fired and the mall was on lockdown for hours. The mall remained closed the following day. No one was injured or killed, other than Shoop himself, who committed suicide.

== Popular culture ==
- Garden State Plaza is the setting for Tricia Sullivan's science fiction novel Maul (2002). The novel takes its title from the way that the word "mall" is pronounced with the New Jersey accent. In the novel, three teenage girls start a shoot out with a local gang.
- Several episodes of The Sopranos, the HBO mob drama were filmed at the mall, which was called the "Paramus Mall".
- The 2005 Sesame Street direct-to-video special All Star Alphabet, featuring Stephen Colbert and Nicole Sullivan, was filmed on location at the mall.

== See also ==
- Shopping malls in New Jersey
- Westfield Group
