= List of shopping malls in New Jersey =

Shopping malls in New Jersey have played a major role in shaping the suburban landscape of the state following World War II.

== History ==
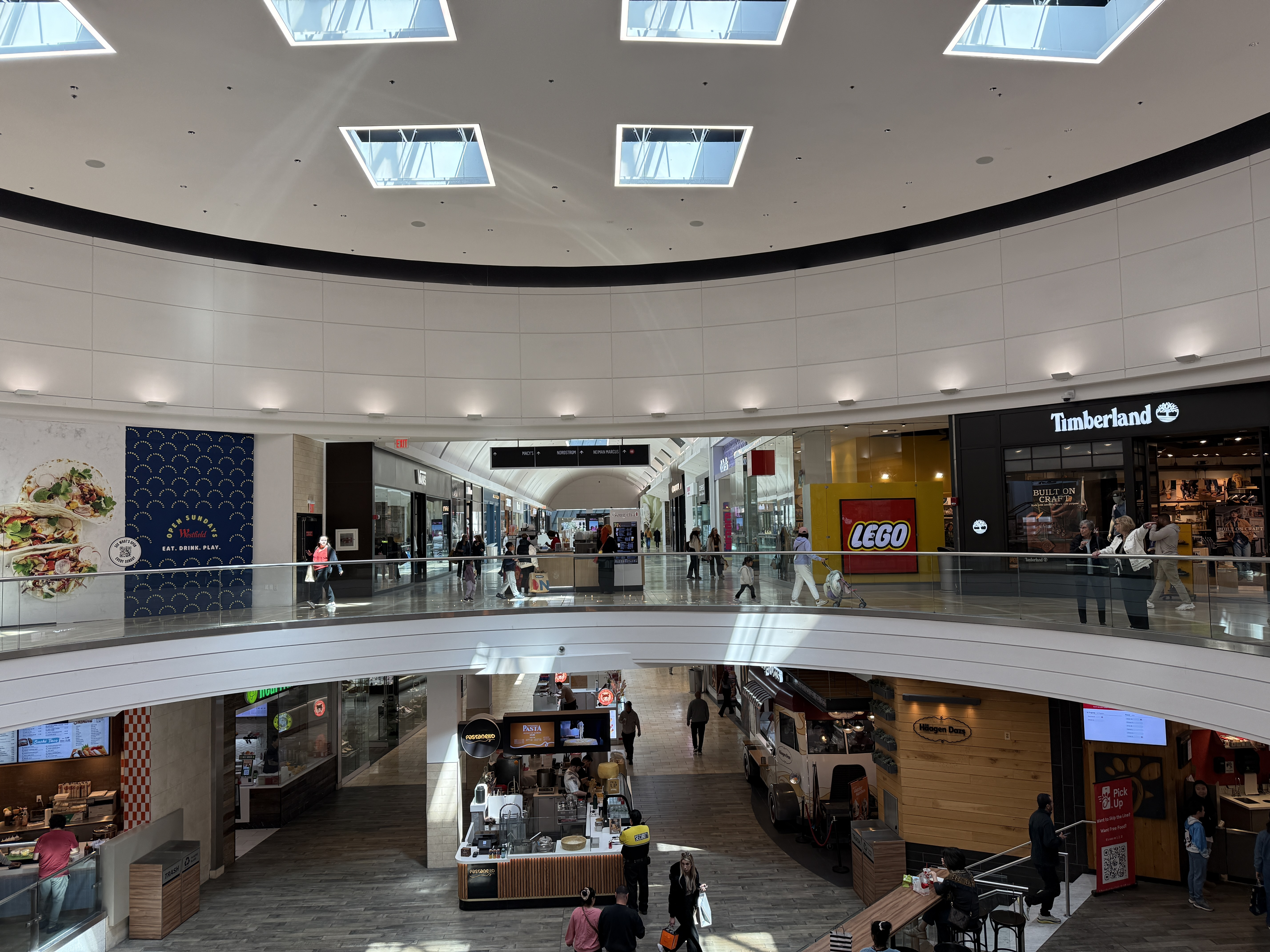
Westfield Garden State Plaza in Paramus

New Jersey, the most densely populated state in the United States, and in the suburban sphere of influence of both New York City and Philadelphia, Pennsylvania, has a comparatively large number of notable malls throughout the state. Paramus, in Bergen County, is one of the largest shopping meccas in the country, with its four major shopping malls accounting for a significant proportion of the over $5 billion in annual retail sales generated in the borough, more than any other ZIP Code in the United States. This high level of retail sales persists despite the fact that the County, in general, and the Borough, in particular, have blue laws that force the malls and other retailers to close on Sunday.

Garden State Plaza was the state's first shopping mall. It opened in three stages between May 1957 and September 1960 and was fully enclosed in 1984. The shopping complex is now known as Westfield Garden State Plaza. The Garden State's second mall-type shopping venue, Bergen Mall (now known as Outlets at Bergen Town Center), was built in Paramus and Maywood and was officially dedicated on November 14, 1957, with great fanfare, as Dave Garroway, host of The Today Show served as master of ceremonies.

The Bergen Mall, which was fully enclosed in 1973, was first planned in 1955 by Allied Stores to have 100 stores and 8,600 parking spaces in a 1.5 million square feet (140×10^{3} m^{2}) mall that would include a 300,000 ft^{2} (28,000 m^{2}) Stern's store and two other 150,000 ft^{2} (14,000 m^{2}) department stores as part of the initial design. Allied's chairman B. Earl Puckett confidently announced The Bergen Mall as the largest of ten proposed centers, stating that there were 25 cities that could support such centers and that no more than 50 malls of this type would ever be built nationwide.

Cherry Hill Mall, was the first large indoor shopping center on the East Coast of the United States and attracted busloads of visitors soon after its opening in October 1961. (The Southdale Shopping Center in Edina, Minnesota, was the very first enclosed mall, beating Cherry Hill to the honor by five years). The popularity of the mall as a destination is often cited as one of the factors that led the mall's host municipality to change its name from Delaware Township, to its current name of Cherry Hill Township.

Despite an early refusal to temporarily close other New Jersey shopping malls during the COVID-19 pandemic, New Jersey Governor Phil Murphy eventually agreed to do so on March 17, 2020. This came one day after the Jersey Gardens closed after an employee tested positive for COVID-19 and Jersey City Mayor Steve Fulop closed Jersey City's two major shopping malls Newport Centre and Hudson Mall.

== Role as public square ==
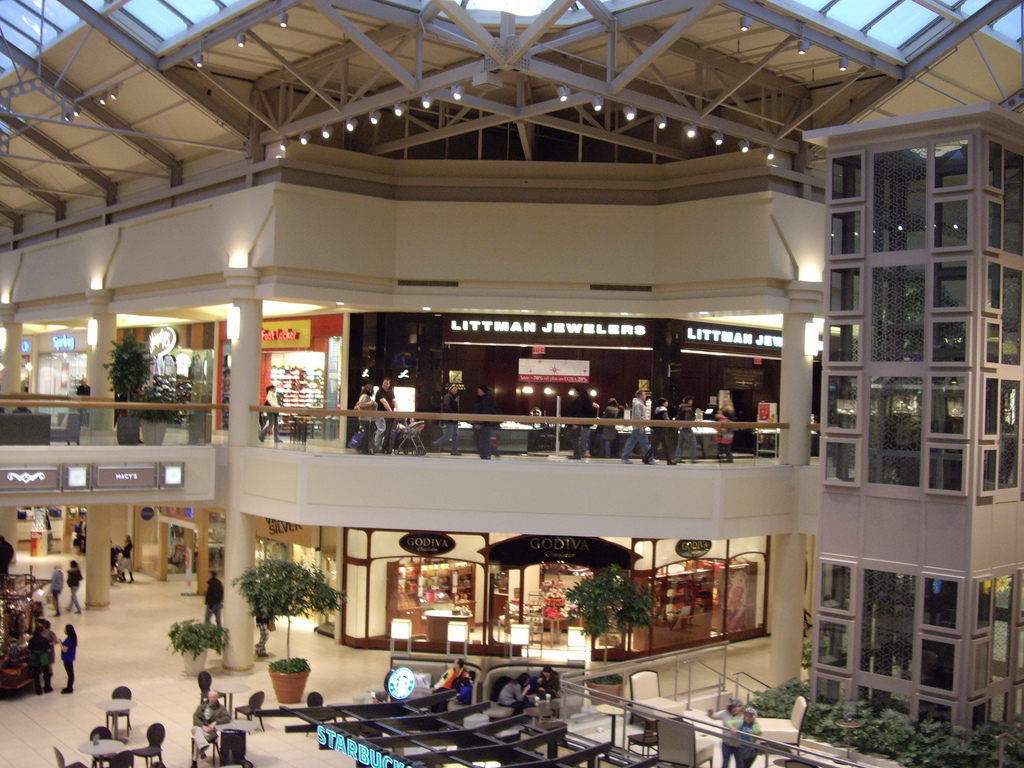
Freehold Raceway Mall in Freehold

With the shift in shopping from publicly owned Main Streets to privately held shopping malls, the question of access to malls, and their shoppers, as a public forum has been an issue raised nationwide. This issue has become particularly relevant in New Jersey, where malls in both suburban and exurban areas have largely supplanted local downtown districts as shopping destinations, depriving individuals and organizations of a public location to reach out to neighbors for distribution of fliers and other forms of expression. While different conclusions have been reached elsewhere, New Jersey's approach has been one of the most expansive in providing groups with access to malls as a public forum, despite their private ownership.

The Bergen Mall was the target of a lawsuit by nuclear-freeze advocates who challenged the malls restrictions on distribution of literature to shoppers. On October 12, 1984, Bergen County Superior Court judge Paul R. Huot ruled that the organization should be allowed to distribute literature anywhere and anytime in a shopping mall, noting that "The Bergen Mall has assumed the features and characteristics of the traditional town center for the citizens who reside in Paramus and surrounding Bergen County towns."

The New Jersey Supreme Court has been at the forefront in providing access to malls as a public forum under the New Jersey State Constitution's free-speech protections, requiring private owners of shopping malls to allow use as a forum by individuals and groups. In New Jersey Coalition Against War in the Middle East v. JMB Realty Corp. (1994), the Court ruled that because the mall owners "have intentionally transformed their property into a public square or market, a public gathering place, a downtown business district, a community," they cannot later deny their own implied invitation to use the space as it was clearly intended. Despite the broad powers granted to those seeking to use these facilities as public forums, mall owners retain the right to establish regulations regulating the time, place and manner of exercising of freedom of speech rights on their properties.

== Role as performance venue ==
In their role as a public forum, malls have also developed a role as a public performance venue, as an addition to theaters, arenas and stadiums. Singer Tiffany was one of the pioneers in this innovative use of malls, using the mall tour as a stepping stone to stardom. The first performance on Tiffany's mall tour — "The Beautiful You: Celebrating The Good Life Shopping Mall Tour '87" — took place on June 23, 1987 at The Bergen Mall (now known as Outlets at Bergen Town Center) in Paramus. The tour was sponsored by major advertisers Toyota, Clairol, and Adidas. While perhaps not the first singer to do so, Tiffany established the shopping mall as a location for public performances. Britney Spears' Hair Zone Mall Tour built on Tiffany's use of the mall as a medium to reach fans. Currently, the New Jersey Youth Symphony plays annually in the Jersey Gardens Outlet Mall. This performance is known as the Playathon and occurs in March.

== List of indoor malls ==
Mall	City	County	Retail space Square feet (ft²)	Stores	Anchor stores/entertainment venues	Year opened	Ownership
Bridgewater Commons	Bridgewater	Somerset	1,002,532	170	Macy's, Bloomingdale's, AMC Theatres	1988	Pacific Retail Capital Partners
Cherry Hill Mall	Cherry Hill	Camden	1,283,000	160	Macy's, Nordstrom, JCPenney, Dick's House of Sport	1961	PREIT
Deptford Mall	Deptford	Gloucester	1,069,657	125	Macy's, JCPenney, Boscov's, Dick's Sporting Goods, Round 1 Entertainment	1975	Macerich
American Dream	East Rutherford	Bergen	3,000,000	450+	Nickelodeon Universe, DreamWorks Water Park, Big Snow American Dream	2019	Triple Five Group
Menlo Park Mall	Edison	Middlesex	1,232,000	167	Macy's, Nordstrom, AMC Theaters, Barnes & Noble, Round 1 Entertainment (Opening in 2026)	1959	Simon Property Group
The Mills at Jersey Gardens	Elizabeth	Union	1,292,611	230	AMC Theaters, Burlington, Marshalls, Primark, Cohoes, Round 1 Entertainment	1999	Simon Property Group
Freehold Raceway Mall	Freehold	Monmouth	1,671,000	237	Macy's, JCPenney, Primark, Dick's House of Sport, L.L. Bean, Von Maur, Dave and Buster's, Freehold Athletic Club	1990	Macerich
The Shops at Riverside	Hackensack	Bergen	637,963	66	Bloomingdale's, AMC Theatres, Barnes and Noble	1977	Simon Property Group
Newport Centre	Jersey City	Hudson	1,149,147	131	Macy's, JCPenney, Kohl's, Primark, Dick's House of Sport	1987	LeFrak Organization & Simon Property Group
Quaker Bridge Mall	Lawrence Township	Mercer	1,102,000	116	Macy's, JCPenney	1975	Simon Property Group
Livingston Mall	Livingston	Essex	980,000	109	Macy's (closing 2026), Barnes & Noble (closing 2027)	1972	Kohan Retail Investment Group
Hamilton Mall	Mays Landing	Atlantic	1,028,500	115	Macy's	1987	Namdar Realty Group
Moorestown Mall	Moorestown	Burlington	1,046,100	90+	Boscov's, HomeSense, Michaels, Planet Fitness, Sierra Trading Post, Regal Cinemas, Turn 7	1963	PREIT
Bergen Town Center	Paramus	Bergen	1,011,575	100	Saks Off Fifth, Bloomingdale's The Outlet Store, Nordstrom Rack, Burlington, Kohl’s, Marshalls, HomeGoods, Target, Whole Foods, Emberly Furniture	1957	Urban Edge Properties
Garden State Plaza	Paramus	Bergen	2,132,112	335	Macy's, Nordstrom, Neiman Marcus, AMC Theatres	1957	Unibail-Rodamco-Westfield
Paramus Park	Paramus	Bergen	764,996	107	Macy's, Stew Leonard's	1974	Brookfield Properties
MarketFair Mall	Princeton	Mercer	245,947	47	AMC Theatres, Barnes & Noble	1987	Madison Marquette
Rockaway Townsquare	Rockaway Township	Morris	1,250,000	152	Macy's, JCPenney, Raymour & Flanigan	1977	Simon Property Group
The Mall at Short Hills	Short Hills	Essex	1,342,000	160+	Macy's, Bloomingdale's, Nordstrom, Neiman Marcus	1961	Taubman Centers
Ocean County Mall	Toms River	Ocean	791,125	105	Macy's, JCPenney, Boscov's	1976	Simon Property Group
Cumberland Mall	Vineland	Cumberland	921,593		Boscov's, Dick's Sporting Goods	1973	Kohan Retail Investment Group
Willowbrook Mall	Wayne	Passaic	1,514,000	165	Macy's, Bloomingdale's, JCPenney, Dave & Buster's, BJ’s Wholesale Club	1969	Brookfield Properties
Woodbridge Center	Woodbridge	Middlesex	1,633,000	200	Macy's, JCPenney, Boscov's, Dick's Sporting Goods, Dave & Buster's	1971	Sagehall Partners and Spinoso Real Estate Group

== List of non traditional indoor malls ==
Mall	City	Retail space Square feet (ft²)	Stores	Anchor stores/entertainment venues	Year opened	Ownership
Playground Pier	Atlantic City	320,788	10	ACX1 Studios	1906	C-III Capital Partners
The Quarter at Tropicana	Atlantic City	200,000	40+		2004	Tropicana Entertainment
Hudson Mall	Jersey City	377,090	40	Big Lots, Marshalls, Staples, Old Navy, Asian Food Market, Chuck E. Cheese, Retro Fitness		Urban Edge Properties
Center City Mall	Paterson	320,000		Marshalls, Burlington, PriceRite, Fabian 8 Cinema	2008	City of Paterson
Kinnelon Mall	Butler	77,000	12	Stop & Shop, Atlantic Health System Primary Care		UBP Properties

== List of outlet malls ==
Mall	City	Retail space Square feet (ft²)	Stores	Year opened	Ownership
Tanger Outlets Atlantic City	Atlantic City, New Jersey	1,292,611	100+	2003	Tanger
Jersey Shore Premium Outlets	Tinton Falls, New Jersey	434,428	120	2008	Simon Property Group
Gloucester Premium Outlets	Blackwood, New Jersey	369,686	80+	2015	Simon Property Group
Jackson Premium Outlets	Jackson, New Jersey	285,696	70	1997	Simon Property Group

== List of outdoor malls ==
Mall	Location	Gross leasable area (in sq ft)	Notes
Briarcliff Commons	Morris Plains	179,508	Anchored by Kohl's and Uncle Giuseppe's Marketplace. Formerly known as Kohl's Plaza.
The Village at Bridgewater Commons	Bridgewater	94,000	A small lifestyle center anchored by Maggiano's Little Italy and a Summit Medical Group Medical Office, and contains 12 other stores including 1000 Degrees Pizzeria, Yong Kang Street, LOFT, Banana Republic and Charles Schwab. The Village opened in 2005 as part of Bridgewater Commons' extensive renovation including a new Marriott Hotel, two new office buildings which are now mostly occupied by Brother Industries and Sanofi, and an extensive Food Court remodel including new restaurants, new seating, renovated eateries, and the removal of openings to the second floor.
Bridgewater Promenade	Bridgewater	370,545	
Bridgewater Towne Centre	Bridgewater	460,000	
The Shoppes at Cinnaminson	Cinnaminson	301,311	Cinnaminson Mall (1972) was a mini-mall with a Woolco and a twin cinema. The new shopping complex redeveloped by Centro Properties Group, offers opportunities for various sized retailers in diverse categories for both in-line space and outparcels. During the redevelopment of the Cinnaminson Mall into The Shoppes at Cinnaminson, all existing buildings have were demolished and a new ground up Shop-Rite supermarket anchored community shopping center was built on 40 acres (160,000 m^{2}).
Flemington Marketplace	Flemington	239,081	Formerly known as Flemington Mall.
Forrestal Village	Plainsboro	720,000	Dying open-air mall.
Garwood Mall	Garwood	87,500	Stores include Investors Savings, Union County Healthcare, Crunch Fitness, Gamestop, Kings Dry Cleaners, RadioShack, Pet Valu, AutoZone, Rudy's Restaurant, Jumbo Wash, GNC and Kings.
ITC Crossing South	Flanders	508,066	Anchors include Walmart, Lowe's, PetSmart, TJ Maxx, Michaels, HomeGoods, Ross and Boot Barn.
The Shops at Ledgewood Commons	Ledgewood	518,246	Formerly an enclosed mall known as Ledgewood Mall. Anchors are Walmart, Marshalls, Ashley HomeStore, Burlington, and At Home.
The Mall at Mill Creek	Secaucus	400,000	
The Mall at Wild Geese	Mount Olive	21,474	Small strip mall anchored by Dunkin', Dragon’s Den Martial Arts, & Verdi Fresh Farmers Market.
Manalapan EpiCentre	Manalapan	460,000	Formerly known as Manalapan mall. Converted to power center in 2002.
The Marketplace At Brick	Brick	334,333	Current stores open include Costco, Dick's Sporting Goods, Staples, City Nails and Spa, Hair Cuttery, Turning Point Café, Petco, Tommy's Coal Fired Pizza, Qdoba Mexican Grill, American Automobile Association, Chase Bank, and Houlihan's.
Marketplace at Rockaway	Rockaway Township	241,952	Anchored by Walmart, Planet Fitness and Dick's Sporting Goods. Opened in 2005.
Mercer Mall	Lawrence Township	527,000	
Middlesex Mall	South Plainfield	320,000	
Morris Hills Shopping Center	Parsippany	159,561	
Roxbury Mall	Succasunna	706,000	Former partially enclosed mall (the enclosed mall part closed and became The Home Depot). Other anchors include Jo-Ann Stores (previously Stein Mart, Amazing Savings, Rag Shop and Odd Job), ShopRite, Ramsey Outdoor (previously Linens n' Things and Acme), and Kohl's (previously Caldor).
Streets of Chester	Chester Borough	104,682	
Nassau Park Pavilion	Princeton	1,117,098	
Princeton Shopping Center	Princeton	225,000	
The Promenade at Sagemore	Evesham	272,000	
Seacourt Pavilion	Toms River	253,000	
The Shoppes at Union Hill	Denville	91,717	Anchored by Trader Joe's and Gap. Opened in May 2003.
Troy Hills Plaza	Parsippany-Troy Hills	211,000	Anchors are Michaels, Target and LA Fitness. Also known as "Troy Hills Shopping Center".
Wharton Mall	Wharton	45,500	Small Strip Mall anchored by Walgreens & Dollar Tree.
Willingboro Town Center	Willingboro	29,246	Open-air shopping center Formerly known as Willingboro Plaza. Plaza stores included Sears.

== Largest malls ==
The largest malls in New Jersey—those and ranked in descending order by size Gross Leasable Area (GLA) are:

1. American Dream Meadowlands – 3,000,000 sq ft (280,000 m^{2})
2. Westfield Garden State Plaza – 2,132,112 sq ft (198,079.7 m^{2})
3. Freehold Raceway Mall – 1,671,000 sq ft (155,200 m^{2})
4. Woodbridge Center – 1,633,000 sq ft (151,700 m^{2})
5. Willowbrook Mall – 1,514,000 sq ft (140,700 m^{2})
6. The Mall At Short Hills – 1,342,000 sq ft (124,700 m^{2})
7. The Mills at Jersey Gardens – 1,292,611 sq ft (120,087.5 m^{2})
8. Cherry Hill Mall – 1,283,000 sq ft (119,200 m^{2})
9. Rockaway Townsquare – 1,250,000 sq ft (116,000 m^{2})
10. Menlo Park Mall – 1,232,000 sq ft (114,500 m^{2})
11. Newport Centre – 1,149,147 sq ft (106,759.2 m^{2})
12. Quaker Bridge Mall – 1,102,000 sq ft (102,400 m^{2})
13. Deptford Mall – 1,069,657 sq ft (99,374.4 m^{2})
14. Moorestown Mall – 1,046,100 sq ft (97,190 m^{2})
15. Hamilton Mall – 1,028,500 sq ft (95,550 m^{2})
16. Bergen Town Center – 1,011,575 sq ft (93,978.4 m^{2})
17. Bridgewater Commons – 1,002,532 sq ft (93,138.3 m^{2})
18. Cumberland Mall – 921,593 sq ft (85,618.8 m^{2})
19. Ocean County Mall – 791,125 sq ft (73,497.9 m^{2})
20. Paramus Park – 764,996 sq ft (71,070.5 m^{2})
21. The Shops at Riverside – 637,963 sq ft (59,268.7 m^{2})
22. MarketFair Mall – 245,947 sq ft (22,849.2 m^{2})

== Former shopping malls ==
The following shopping malls have been demolished or closed. Some have been replaced by new strip plazas or re-developed for non-retail uses:

Mall Name	Location	Retail space Square feet (ft²)	Stores	Year Opened	Year Closed	Ownership	Notes
American Way Outlet Center	Fairfield	135,000		1981	1992		Former outlet mall. It was one of the earliest examples of the "outlet mall" concept in the region, designed to look like an indoor street with colonial-style storefronts. The mall struggled with competition from the nearby Willowbrook Mall and the rise of larger, more modern outlet centers like Secaucus Outlets and Liberty Village..
Brunswick Square	East Brunswick	760,998	60+	1970	2026	Spinoso Real Estate Group	Former enclosed mall. On December 15, 2025, redevelopment of the mall broke ground, which will transform it into an outdoor mixed-use development. AMC Theaters and Barnes and Noble will remain as anchor tenants.
Burlington Center Mall	Burlington Township	670,000		1982	2018		Former enclosed mall. This mall shut down on January 12, 2018 except Sears, which shut down September 2, 2018
Cedar Knolls Plaza	Hanover Township	258,524		1978	2019		Former enclosed mall. Formerly known as Morris County Mall. Under renovations in 2020 to become a strip mall called Hanover Crossroads.
Cinnaminson Mall	Cinnaminson	301,311		1971	2009		Formed enclosed mall. Redeveloped into a power center called the Shoppes at Cinnaminson in 2009.
Fashion Center	Paramus	446,000		1967	2009		Former enclosed mall. Bergen Mall opened in 1967 as a traditional indoor shopping mall. The mall slowly underwent a "de-malling" process over a period of several years prior to 2009, which resulted in the former interior portion of the mall gradually taken over by other stores and eventually sealed off, with each store inside the center having its own outside entrances. It is now known as The Fashion Center and is one of the four malls located in Paramus.
Flemington Mall	Flemington	239,081		1976	2002		Formed enclosed mall. Redeveloped into a power center called Flemington MarketPlace in 2003.
Hackettstown Mall	Hackettstown	186,124		1983	2004		Formed enclosed mall. Redeveloped as a power center at 215 Mountain Avenue in 2004.
Harbor Square	Egg Harbor Township	635,000		1968	2013		Former enclosed mall. Originally opened in 1968 as an open-air mall called Searstown. Between 1971 and 1974, the mall was enclosed. Later on it was renamed Shore Mall. Redeveloped into a strip mall now called Harbor Square starting in 2010. Currently anchored by Boscov's.
Liberty Village Premium Outlets	Flemington	164,836		1981	2022		Former outlet mall. Previously owned by owned by Namdar.
Ledgewood Mall	Ledgewood	518,246		1972	2016		Former enclosed mall. From its opening in 1972 until 2016, it was branded Ledgewood Mall. The realty company and developers involved in the proposed Shops at Ledgewood Commons, a 470,000-square-foot open-air mall on Route 10, are moving forward with plans to open in October 2020.
Mall at Fashion Plaza	North Brunswick	429,379		1970s	1995		Formed enclosed mall. Redeveloped as strip mall that is now called North Brunswick Plaza.
Manalapan Mall	Manalapan	460,000		1971	1998		Former enclosed mall. Converted to outlet power center called Manalapan EpiCentre in 2002.
Mill Creek Mall	Manalapan	400,000	50+	1988	2008	Hartz Mountain Industries	Former enclosed mall. Converted to a strip mall called The Mall at Mill Creek.
Monmouth Mall	Eatontown	1,500,000	150	1960	2025	Kushner Companies	Former enclosed mall. The mall closed in 2025. Only certain stores with dedicated exterior entrances are open. On May 24, 2024, demolition broke ground on a walkable, mixed-use redevelopment of the mall, converting much of the enclosed retail space into open-air retail. Macy's, Boscov's, and AMC Theaters will remain as anchor tenants.
Phillipsburg Mall	Phillipsburg	536,000		1989	2020		Former enclosed mall. On December 23, 2019, the remaining tenants of Phillipsburg Mall received lease termination letters, telling them they have 30 days to vacate the mall. The Kohl's store in the mall remains open as of 2024.
Rio Mall	Rio Grande	180,000		1988	1990s		Former enclosed mall. Plans revealed in 2019 for the site to be redeveloped as a new retail center called County Commons.
Seaview Square Mall	Ocean Township	922,361		1977	2000		Former enclosed mall. Re-opened as a power center called Seaview Square Shopping Center in 2012. The Sears store closed in 2018.
The Shoppes on IV	Paramus	134,939		1986	2009		Formed enclosed mall. When it opened, the center was marketed as a luxury "boutique" mall. Over the years, it shifted toward a "Furniture Row" identity. Like the nearby Fashion Center (which de-malled in 2009), the owners recognized that high-end furniture and destination retailers preferred "big-box" visibility. They sealed off the central interior corridors and converted the storefronts to face the parking lot and Route 4, allowing each tenant to have a private, exterior entrance. The "de-malling" process for The Shoppes on IV took place in the late 2000s, with the project reaching its current outdoor configuration by 2009–2010.
Springfield Mall	Springfield	172,000		1974	2010		Formed enclosed mall. The Springfield Mall was a relatively compact "specialty" center. The Saks Fifth Avenue Anchor: This store occupied roughly 90,000 square feet. The mall opened as a two-level, boutique enclosed shopping center on Route 22 East. It was designed to cater to the upscale demographics of Union and Essex Counties. The center reopened as a standard outdoor shopping center called Springfield Plaza in 1993.
Tri-Towne Mall	Marlton	460,000		1973	2014		Former enclosed mall.
Village Mall	Willingboro	228,000		1974	1990s (as Village Mall) (2020 as Grand Marketplace)		Formed enclosed mall. Village Mall was anchored by Acme Market, Woolco/Caldor, and a twin Eric Theater. Became Grand Marketplace, an indoor food/flea market, which closed in 2020.
Voorhees Town Center	Voorhees	732,000	50+	1970	2024	Mason Asset Management and Namdar Realty Group	Former enclosed mall. Originally named Echelon Mall after Echelon Airfield which was located where the mall stands today. Renamed Voorhees Town Center in 2007. The mall closed in April 2024 due to a fire. Only certain stores with dedicated exterior entrances are open.
Wayne Hills Mall	Wayne	193,288		1973	2015		Former enclosed mall. Closed in the 2010s. Demolition started in 2019 and the site was transformed into a power center with a ShopRite supermarket.
Wayne Towne Center	Wayne	679,985		1968	2008		Former enclosed mall. Located Next to Willowbrook Mall. De-malled and converted into a power center also called Wayne Towne Center in 2008. Currently anchored by Costco, Nordstrom Rack, Dick's Sporting Goods, and UFC Fit.
