= Woodbridge Center =

Shopping mall in Middlesex County, New Jersey, U.S.

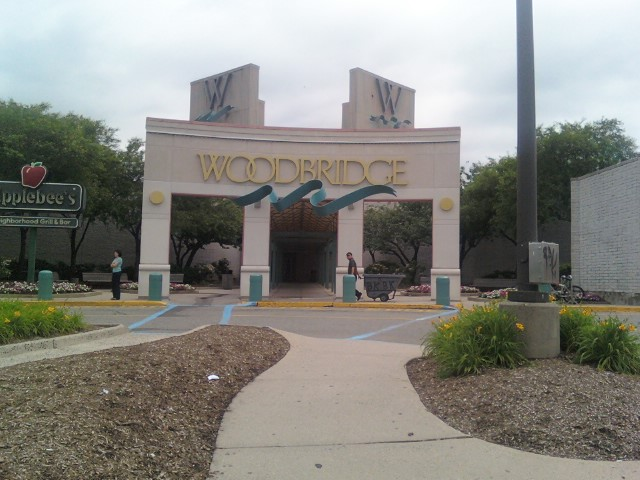
- An entrance to the Center; The four W towers face the four compass directions, with the ones most prominent in the picture being west and south.
- Location: Woodbridge Township, New Jersey, U.S.
- Coordinates: 40.556666°N 74.299213°W
- Address: 250 Woodbridge Center Drive, 07095
- Opened: 1971; 55 years ago
- Developer: The Rouse Company
- Manager: Spinoso Real Estate Group
- Owner: Sagehall Partners
- Num. of stores: 150+
- Num. of anchor tenants: 4
- Floor area: 1,633,000 square feet (151,700 m^{2})
- Floors: 2
- Parking: Parking lot with 8,651 spaces
- Public transit: NJ Transit bus: 48, 810, 815
- Website: www.woodbridgecenter.com

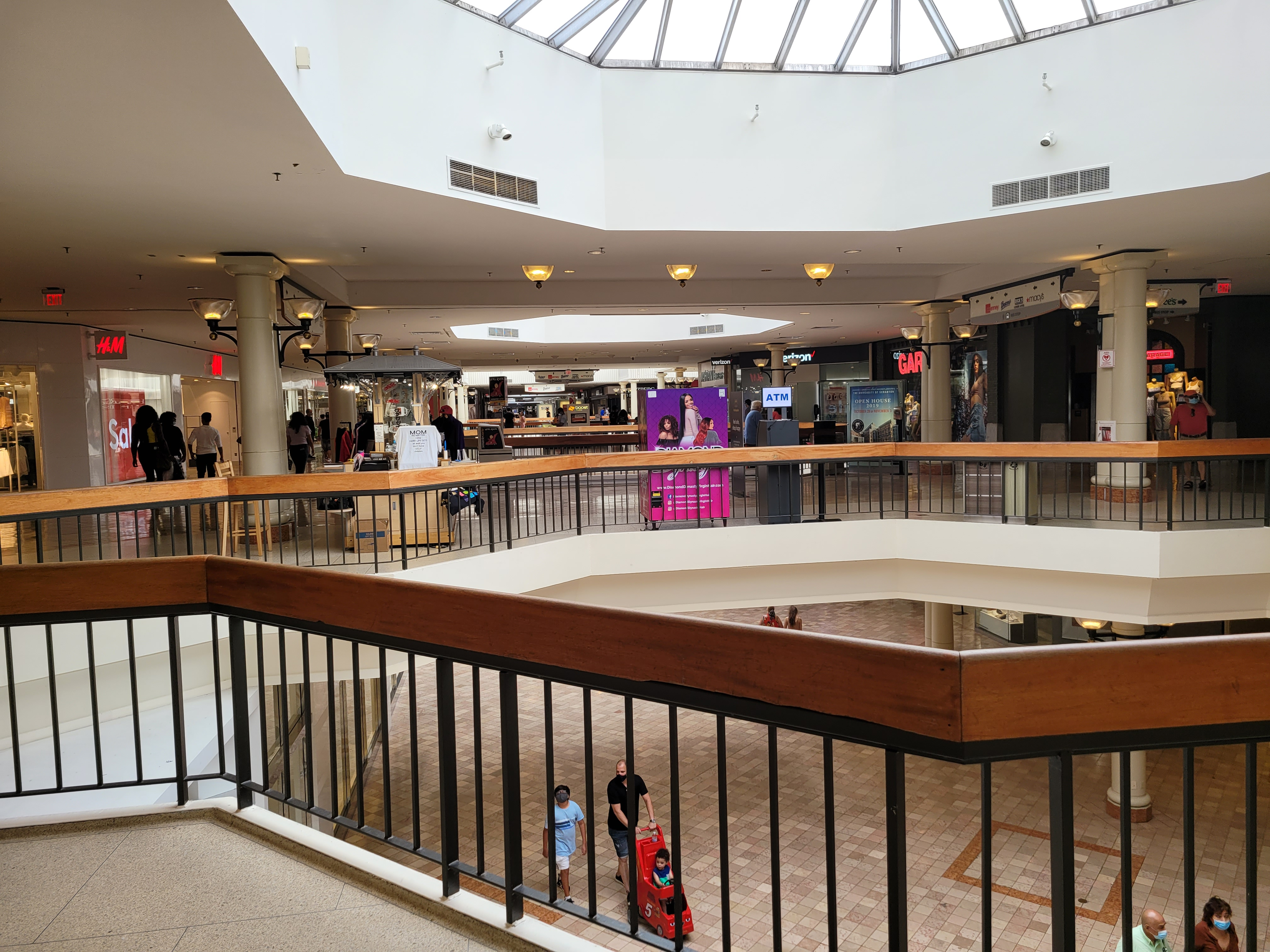
Interior view (July 2021)

Woodbridge Center is a major two-level shopping mall located in Woodbridge Township, in the U.S. state of New Jersey, at the intersection of Route 1 and Route 9. As of 2025, Woodbridge Center features a variety of retail stores, including Macy's, Boscov's, JCPenney, and Dick’s Sporting Goods as anchor stores. Additionally, Hollister, ALDO, Skechers, and JD Sports are among the specialty retailers operating within the mall.

The land that Woodbridge Center now stands on used to be the location of Maple Hill Dairy farm and old clay pits. The mall is owned and managed by Sagehall Partners and Spinoso Real Estate Group. The previous owners and managers were JLL Properties and Brookfield Properties. The mall features a fountain, carousel, train ride, and children's play area. Although most malls have a food court, Woodbridge Center's eating establishments are spread throughout the mall with their own individual seating areas and restrooms.

The mall's proximity to Staten Island and the absence of sales tax on clothes in New Jersey makes this mall, along with nearby Menlo Park Mall in Edison, a popular choice for shoppers from New York City. The mall has gross leasable area (GLA) of 1,633,000 square feet (151,700 m^{2}), making it the fourth largest of all shopping malls in New Jersey, behind Freehold Raceway Mall in Freehold Township, Westfield Garden State Plaza in Paramus, and American Dream in East Rutherford.

== History ==
The mall was developed by the Rouse Company and opened on March 4, 1971, with Abraham & Straus, Ohrbach's, and Stern's. In 1978, the mall was expanded with a new wing to include Hahne's and JCPenney. By 1987, the mall got a fresh new look through renovation. The stairwell in the A&S wing next to center court was removed, new flooring was added, new lighting was added, and the mall entrances were redone. In 2003, the mall was expanded with a new 100,000-square-foot (9,300 m^{2}) Galyan's, the chain's first location in New Jersey, which became Dick's Sporting Goods in 2004. Notable department stores that have closed include Hahne's (became Fortunoff now Boscov's), Ohrbach's (which became Steinbach and later Lord & Taylor), Stern's (now Macy's), and A&S (later Sears). In 2024, Express filed for bankruptcy and announced the closure of several store locations, including its Woodbridge Center location.

In October 2007, the carousel ride was relocated near the JCPenney.

In October 2019, Lord & Taylor announced that it would be closing.

In February 2020, it was announced that Sears would be closing.

In February 2024, Brookfield Properties sold the mall to Jones Lang LaSalle (JLL).

In May 2024, JLL sold the mall to Sagehall, a private New York–based firm, who later hired Spinoso Real Estate Group as manager.

In November 2024, Accu Reference Medical Laboratory purchased the 124,000-square-foot (11,500 m^{2}) site that had been the Lord & Taylor store, which will be repurposed as a medical lab and offices, bringing 300 employees to the site, once completed. As of 2026, the new medical labs at the mall are currently under construction.

== Notable incidents ==
=== 1994 abandoned person ===
On November 4, 1994, a woman was found abandoned at the Woodbridge Center. She had lost her memory and had no idea of her identity. It would be 14 years before she was identified as Elba Soccarras.

=== 2012 shooting ===
On March 8, 2012, police shot and killed a shoplifter in the Sears wing who had held a woman hostage.

== See also ==
- List of neighborhoods in Woodbridge Township, New Jersey
