= Deptford Mall =

Shopping mall in Deptford, New Jersey, U.S.

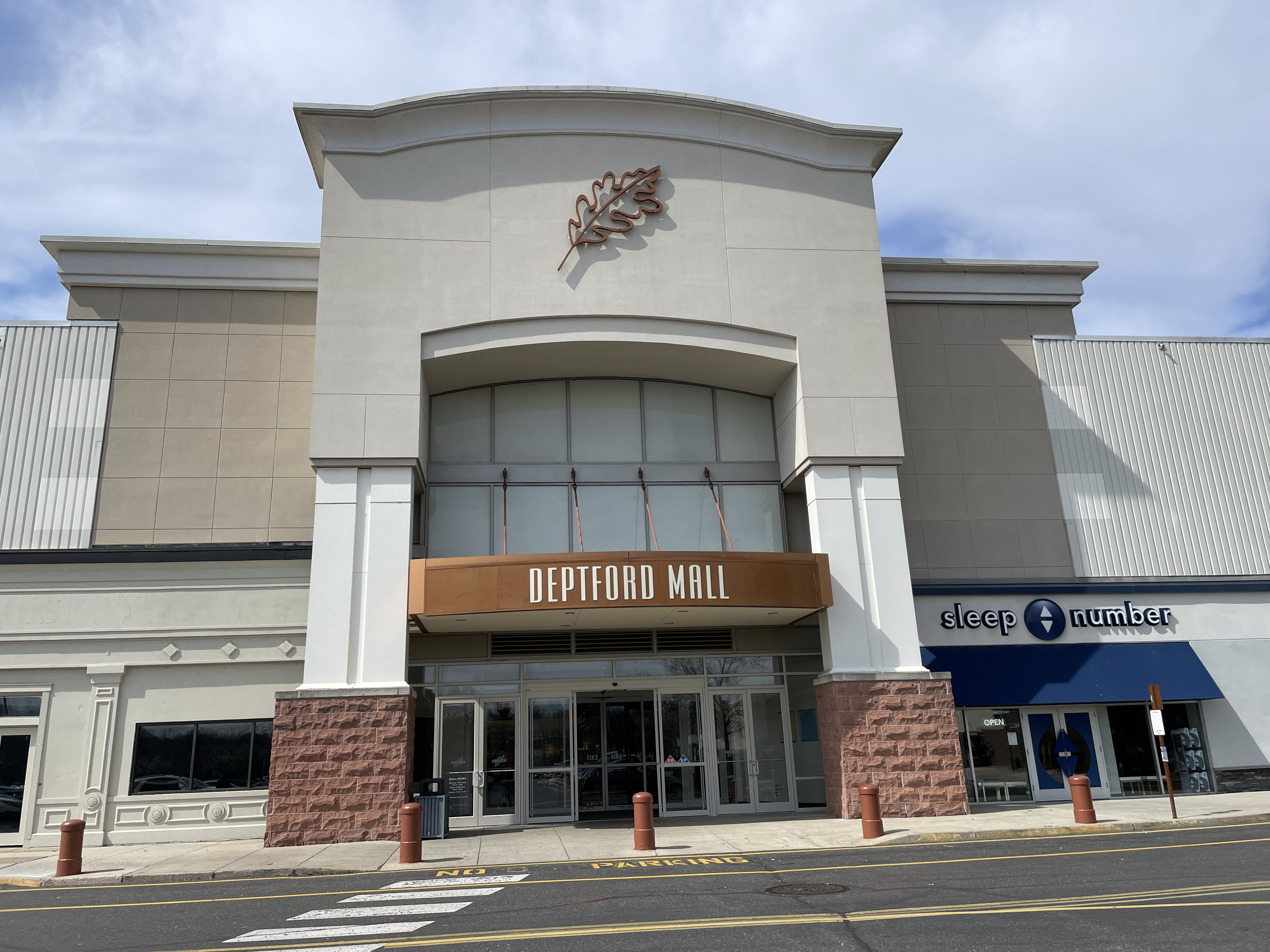
- Deptford Mall entrance between Round 1 Entertainment and JCPenney, March 2023
- Location: Deptford, New Jersey
- Coordinates: 39.8313°N 75.0977°W
- Address: 1750 Deptford Center Rd, Deptford, NJ 08096
- Opened: August 1975
- Developer: Strouse Greenberg
- Manager: Macerich
- Owner: Macerich and Heitman
- Num. of stores: 125
- Num. of anchor tenants: 6
- Floor area: 1,040,000 sq ft (97,000 m^{2})
- Floors: 2 (3 in Boscov's)
- Parking: Parking lot
- Public transit: NJ Transit bus: 400, 455
- Website: deptfordmall.com

Deptford Mall is a major shopping mall in Deptford Township in Gloucester County, New Jersey. Owned and managed by Macerich, it is the county's only indoor regional shopping center.

The mall is anchored by Boscov's, Dick's Sporting Goods, JCPenney, Macy's, Round 1 Entertainment, and an upcoming Golf Galaxy. The mall has over 125 stores. It is located off of Route 42 and Route 55 at County Route 544. The mall has a gross leasable area of 1,040,000 sq ft (97,000 m^{2}), making it the largest mall in the Gloucester County region and placing it in the top eleven among the largest shopping malls in New Jersey.

== History ==
=== 20th century ===
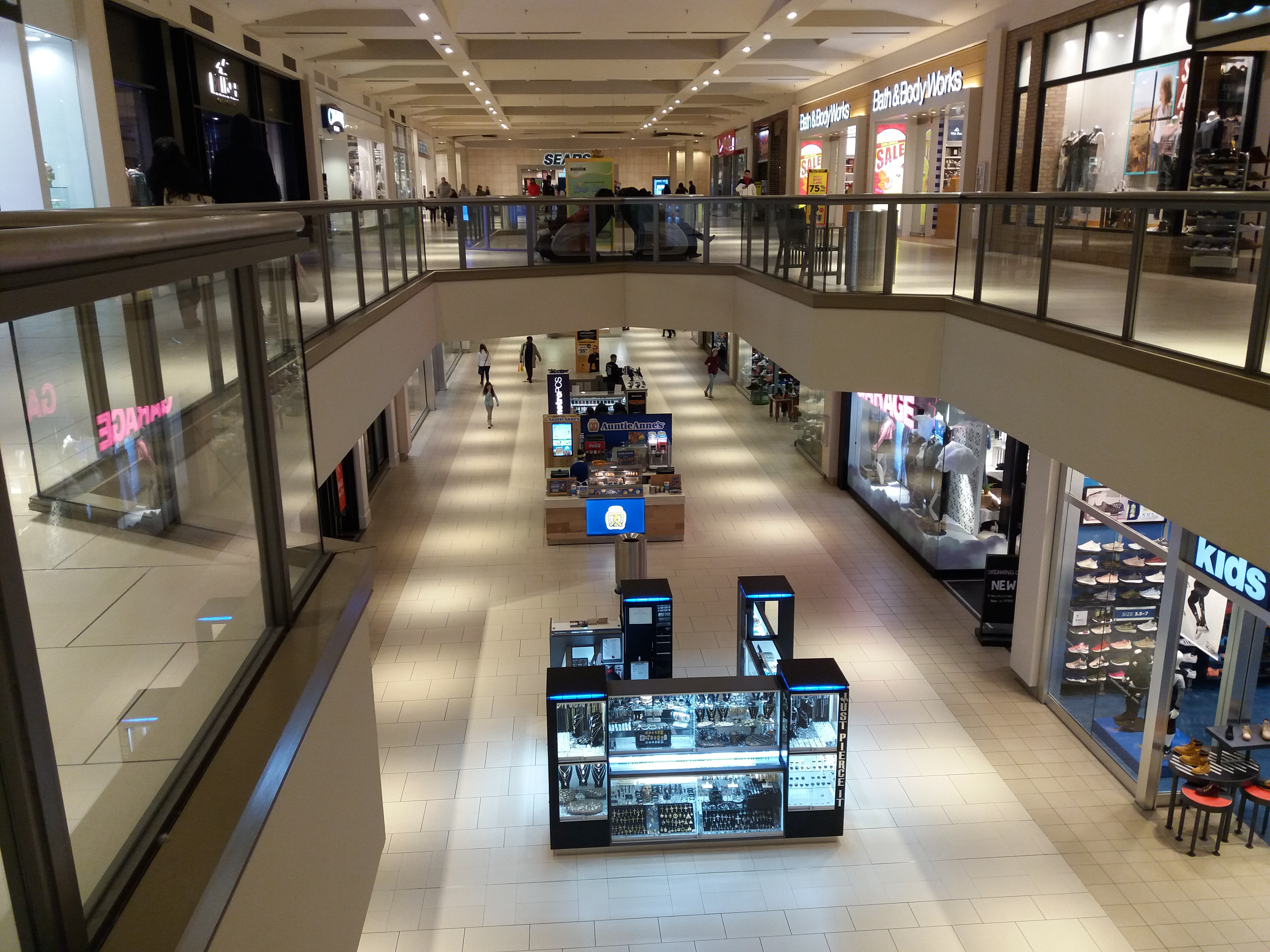
The interior of Deptford Mall in January 2018

The fully enclosed mall opened in August 1975 with three anchor stores, Bamberger's, Sears, and Wanamaker's, and over 150 specialty stores. In 1986, Bamberger's became Macy's. In 1995, the Wanamaker's store became Hecht's. Hecht's became Strawbridge's in 1996 after its parent company, May Department Stores, acquired the Strawbridge's chain. In 2000, construction began to build a JCPenney as a fourth anchor, which opened on August 1, 2001. In 2006, the Strawbridge's store closed after Federated Department Stores acquired May Department Stores; the Strawbridge's was replaced by Boscov's.

On August 5, 1996, a gunman attempted to rob an armored vehicle inside the mall. During the shootout, the gunman and a 17-year-old youth were killed on the scene. A younger girl who was in critical condition after being hit by ricochet later died from her injuries at the hospital.

=== 21st century ===
In January 2007, Macerich purchased the Deptford Mall for $241 million from Simon Property Group. In October 2015, Macerich sold a 49 percent stake in the Deptford Mall to Heitman.

By November 2012, the mall had completed its first renovation since the early 2000s with the vertical movement project, which involved removing the two escalators the mall had and removing stairs at each end and at the center of the mall. Escalators were added at each end of the mall, and an elevator was located in the center, with corresponding stairs.

The floor was replaced throughout the mall. New chairs, booths, and tables were added in the food court along with a children's play area (in front of Jalapeño's). Also, the up escalator in the food court (across from JCPenney) is being replaced by an up and down escalator

Originally, the Deptford Mall did not have a food court and originally it's eating establishments were spread throughout the mall. The food court that we know of today opened on September 4th, 1991 and was originally marketed as "The Diner".;.

In 2015, Sears Holdings spun off 235 of its properties, including the Sears at Deptford Mall, into Seritage Growth Properties.

On October 15, 2018, it was announced the Sears store would be closing as part of a plan to close 142 stores nationwide as a result of the company filing for Chapter 11 bankruptcy. The store closed in January 2019. The lower level of Sears was replaced by Dick's Sporting Goods, which relocated from its location across the street on Almonesson Road. It opened in September 2020.

In 2019, Round One Entertainment announced plans to occupy the upper level of the former Sears building by fall 2020. It opened on October 30, 2020.

== Gallery ==
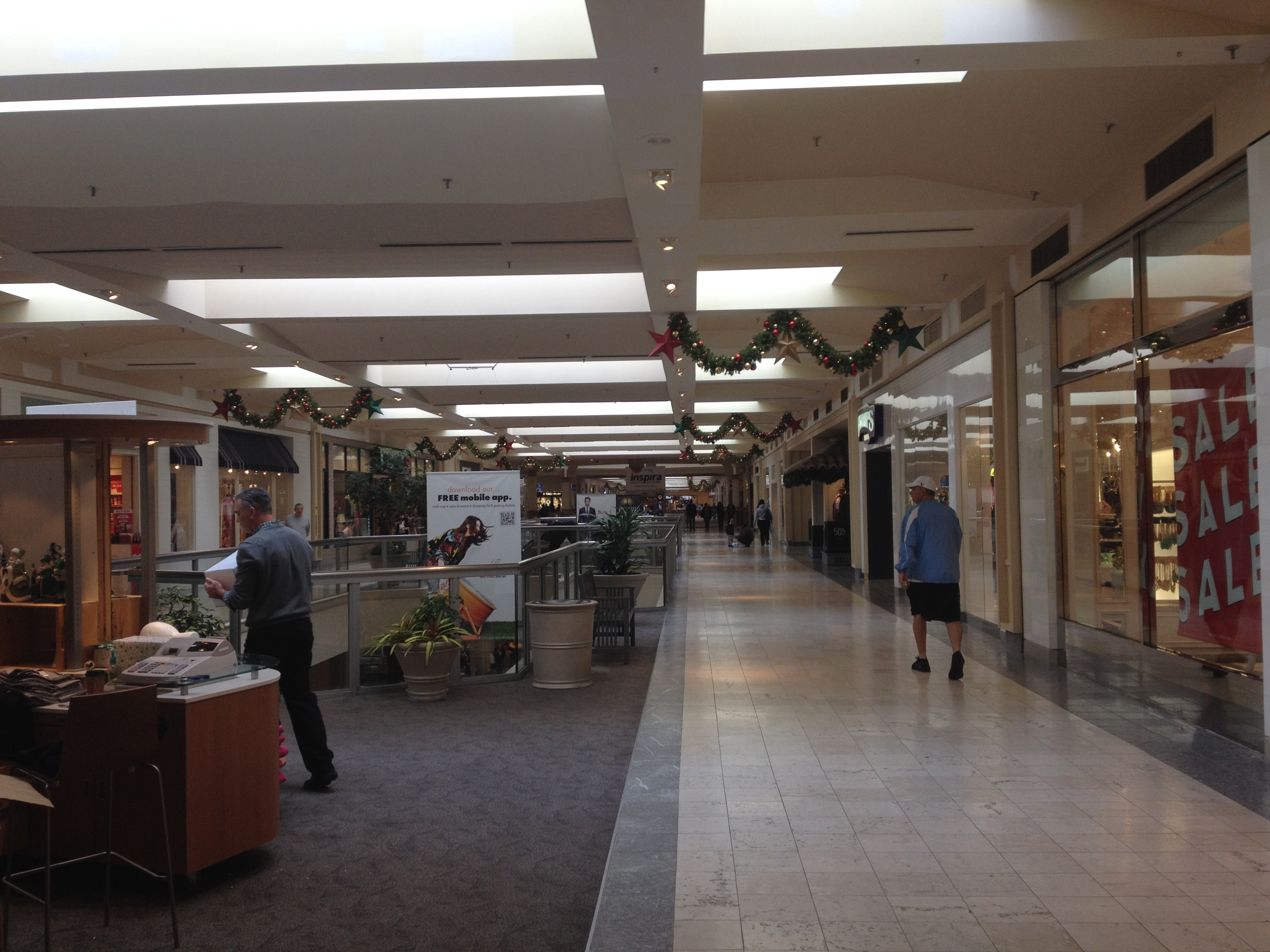
The second floor of the mall looking from the former Sears

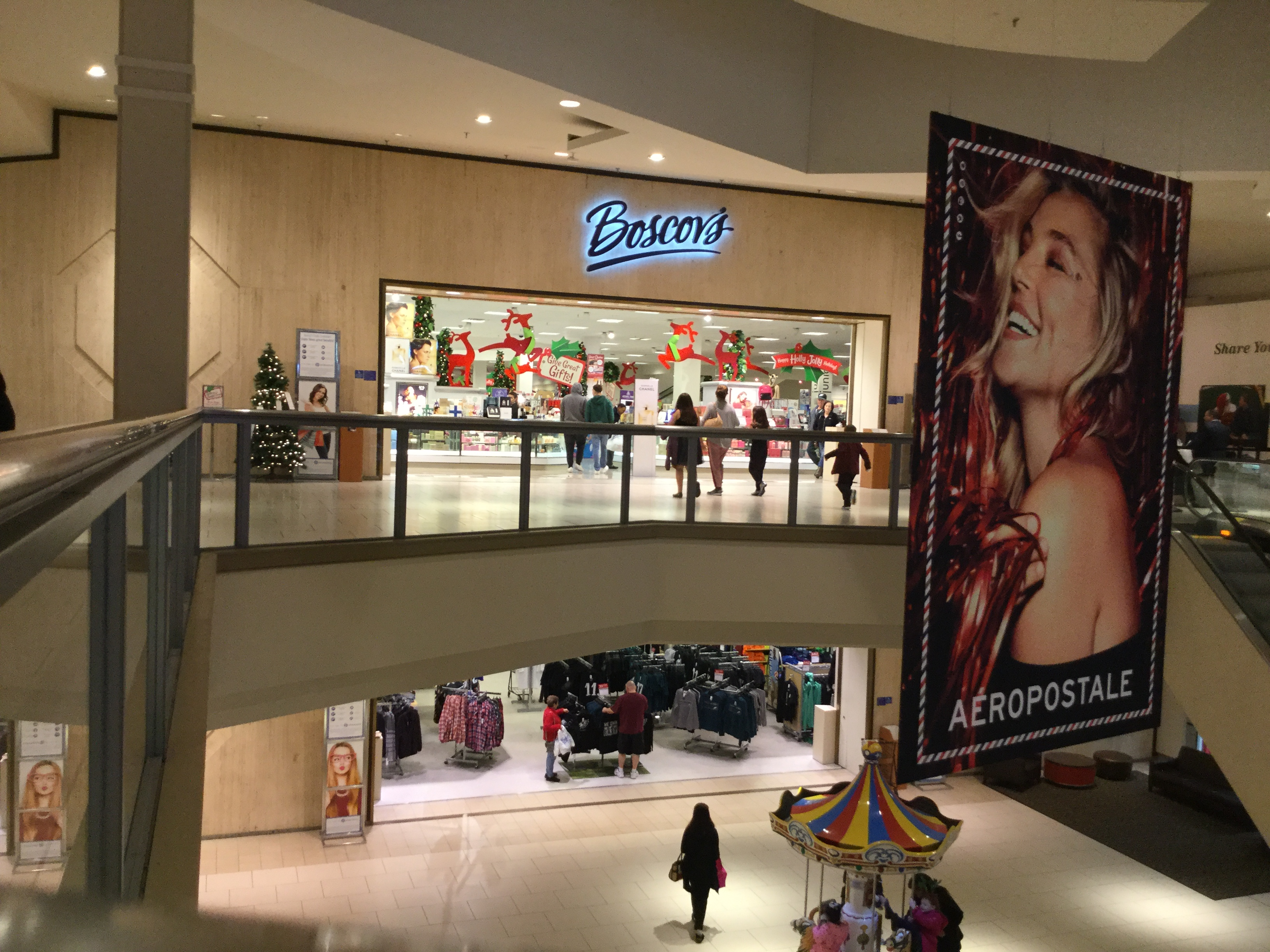
Boscov's mall entrance from upper level

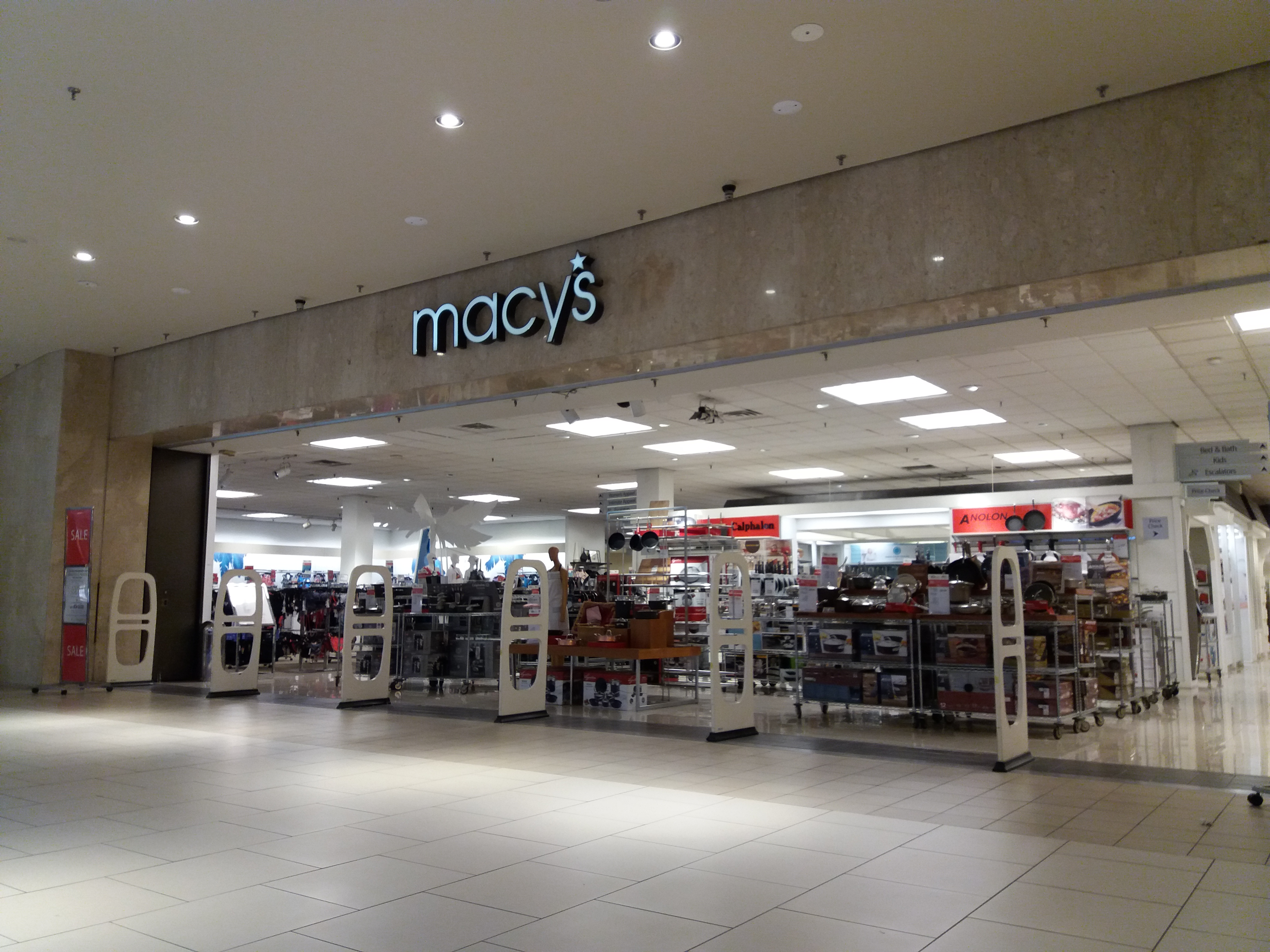
Lower level mall entrance of Macy's. A label scar of Bamberger's is visible behind the sign

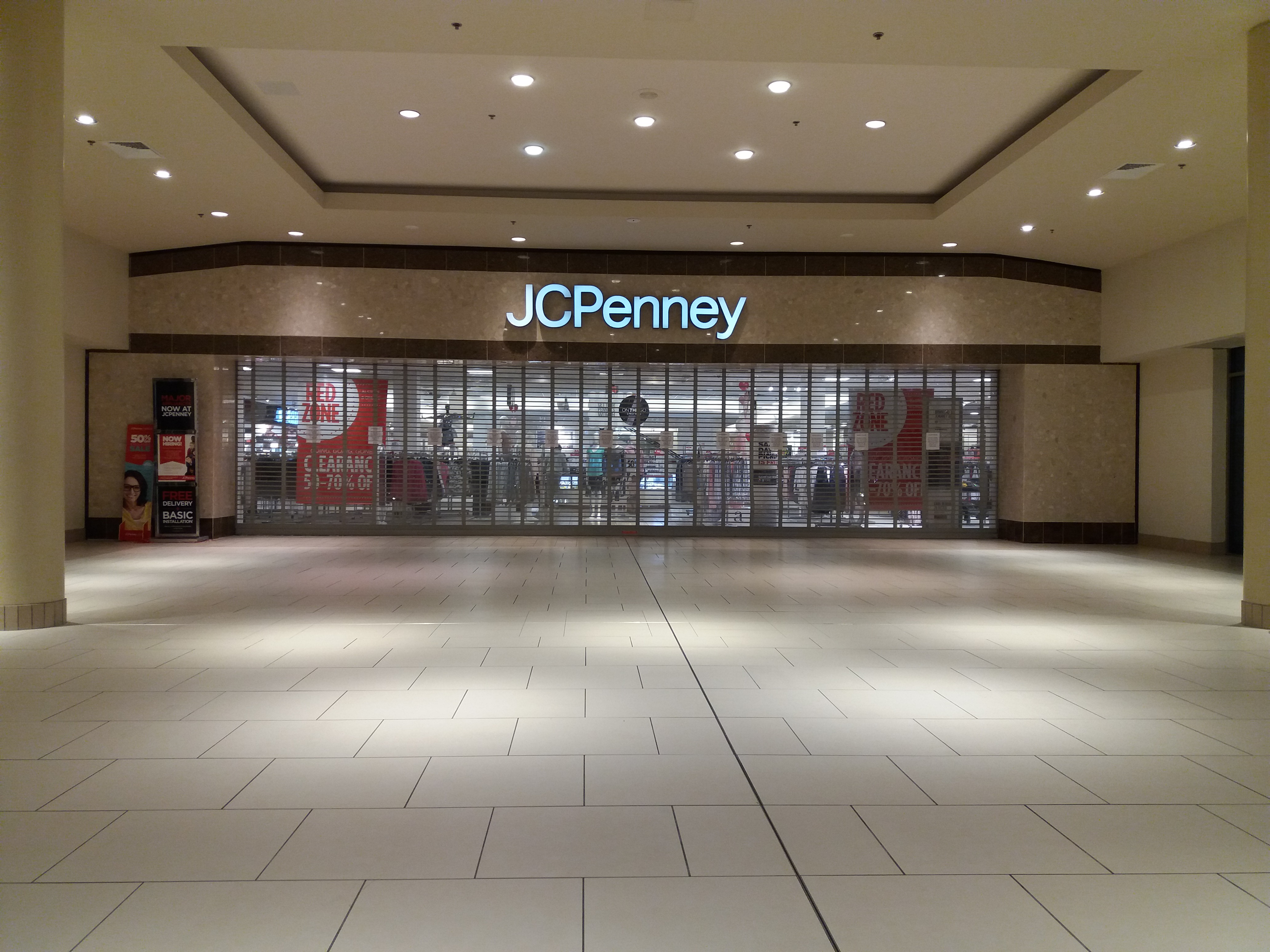
Lower level mall entrance of JCPenney

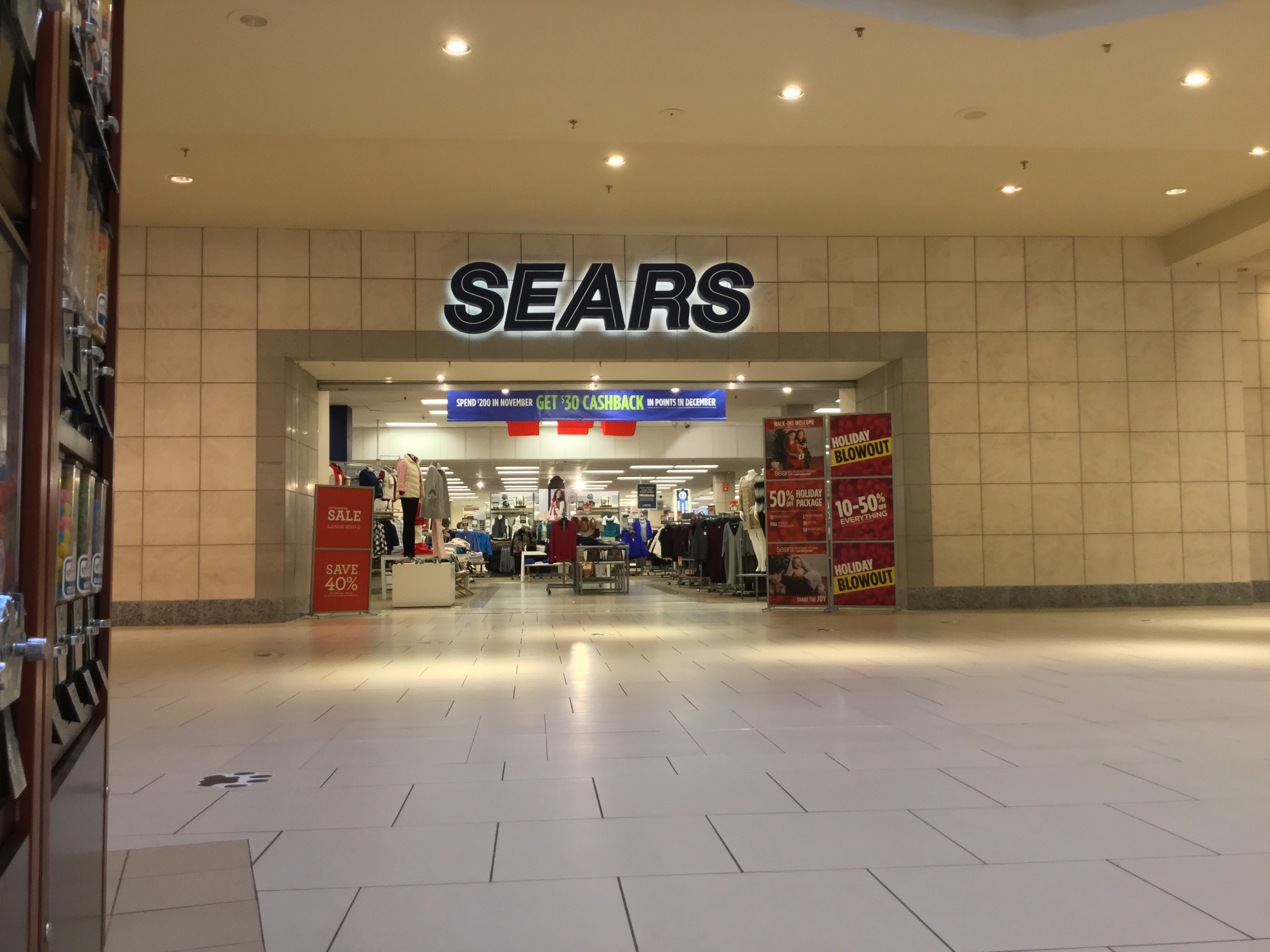
Lower level mall entrance of former Sears
