= Laurel Mall =

Laurel Mall may refer to:

- Laurel Mall (Maryland) in Laurel, Maryland
- Laurel Mall (Pennsylvania) in Hazleton, Pennsylvania
