= Cumberland Mall =

Cumberland Mall can refer to:

- Cumberland Mall (Georgia), located in the Cumberland district of Cobb County, Georgia (Metro Atlanta).
- Cumberland Mall (Maryland), located in downtown Cumberland, Maryland
- Cumberland Mall (New Jersey)
