= Fowler, Dick & Walker =

Pennsylvania department store chain

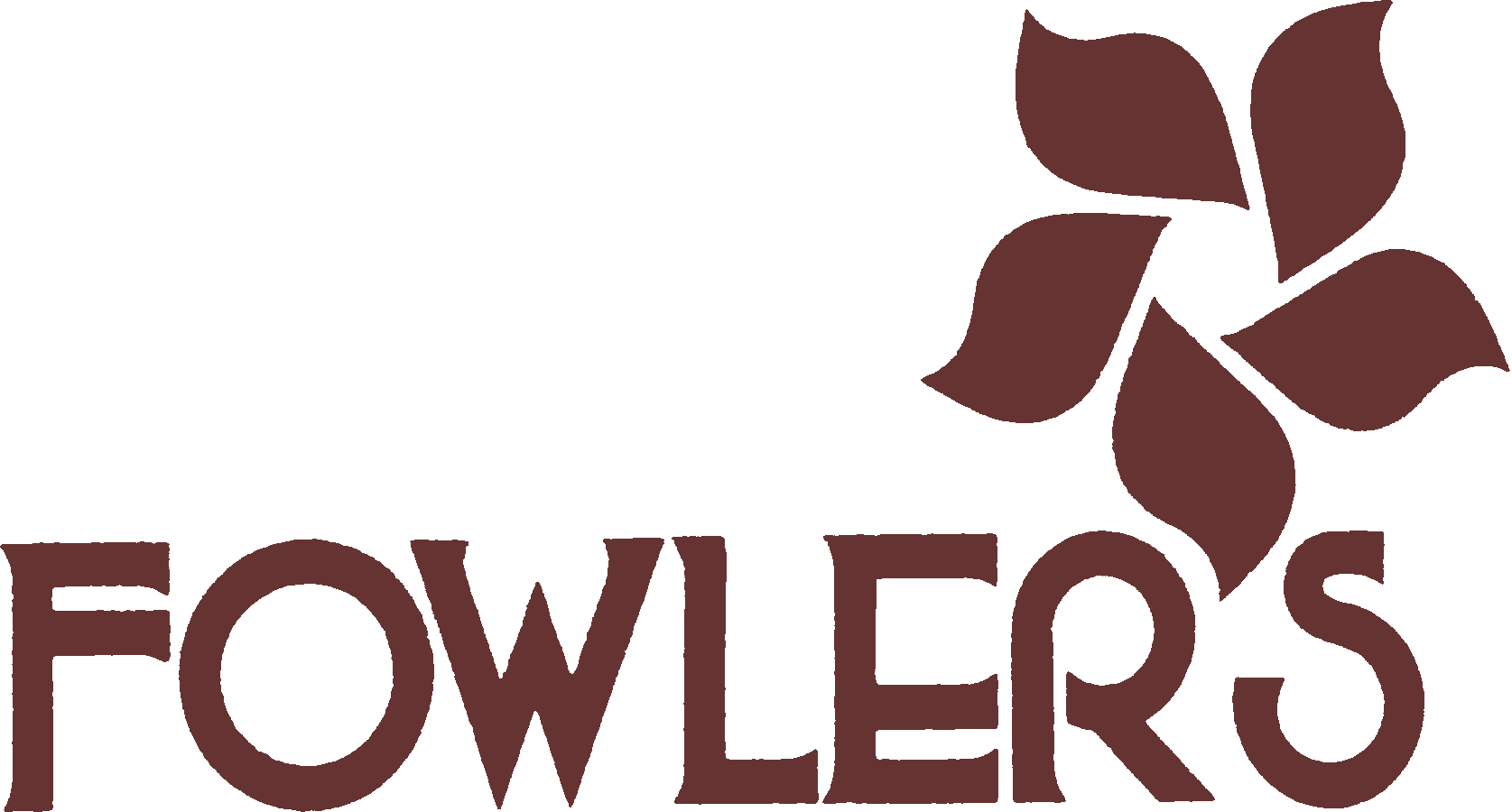
Fowler's logo

Fowler, Dick & Walker, later known as Fowler's, was a chain of department stores, also called The Boston Store. They started business as a very small dry goods store in Wilkes-Barre, Pennsylvania in 1879, occupying space in another establishment at 120 South Main Street. The founders were George Fowler, Alexander Dick and Gilbert Walker. They had previous employment experience in the dry goods business in Connecticut.

The first store opened for business on April 5, 1879. By December, they were advertising in other nearby towns, and by February had 18 employees.

In 1882, they opened a Binghamton, New York branch. In 1889, there was also an Evansville, Indiana branch of the business, well known in the region by 1892. By 1904, they were advertising their new store location in downtown Binghamton, New York at the intersection of Court Street and Water Street. The Binghamton store was the flagship for over 75 years.

The Evansville subsidiary was dissolved in 1934. A branch store opened in 1975 in the Oakdale Mall in suburban Binghamton, but the downtown store remained in operation.

The Wilkes-Barre store was severely damaged in the Hurricane Agnes flood in 1972 while at the same time Fowler's opened at the nearby Wyoming Valley Mall. Another branch was opened in the Laurel Mall in Hazleton, Pennsylvania, which Fowler, Dick and Walker also developed. The combination of the slowdown at the downtown Wilkes-Barre store and the expense of opening the new store, which started off slowly, proved too much.

Fowler's passed through several owners, starting in 1970 with Wheeling-based L. S. Good, but none of these ventures succeeded, and by 1980, the stores were in bankruptcy. At that point, Fowler's had the original Wilkes-Barre store (now occupying the whole of the building) and the two Binghamton-area stores.

Boscov's took over downtown Binghamton after the store was shut down during 1978–1981. The downtown Wilkes-Barre store was converted to a Boscov's without closing, and Boscov's took over the Hazleton location as well. All three stores remain highly successful Boscov's locations, with Binghamton as the flagship of the chain. (The Oakdale Mall location was taken over by Hess's, later became a Bon-Ton, and is now closed.)

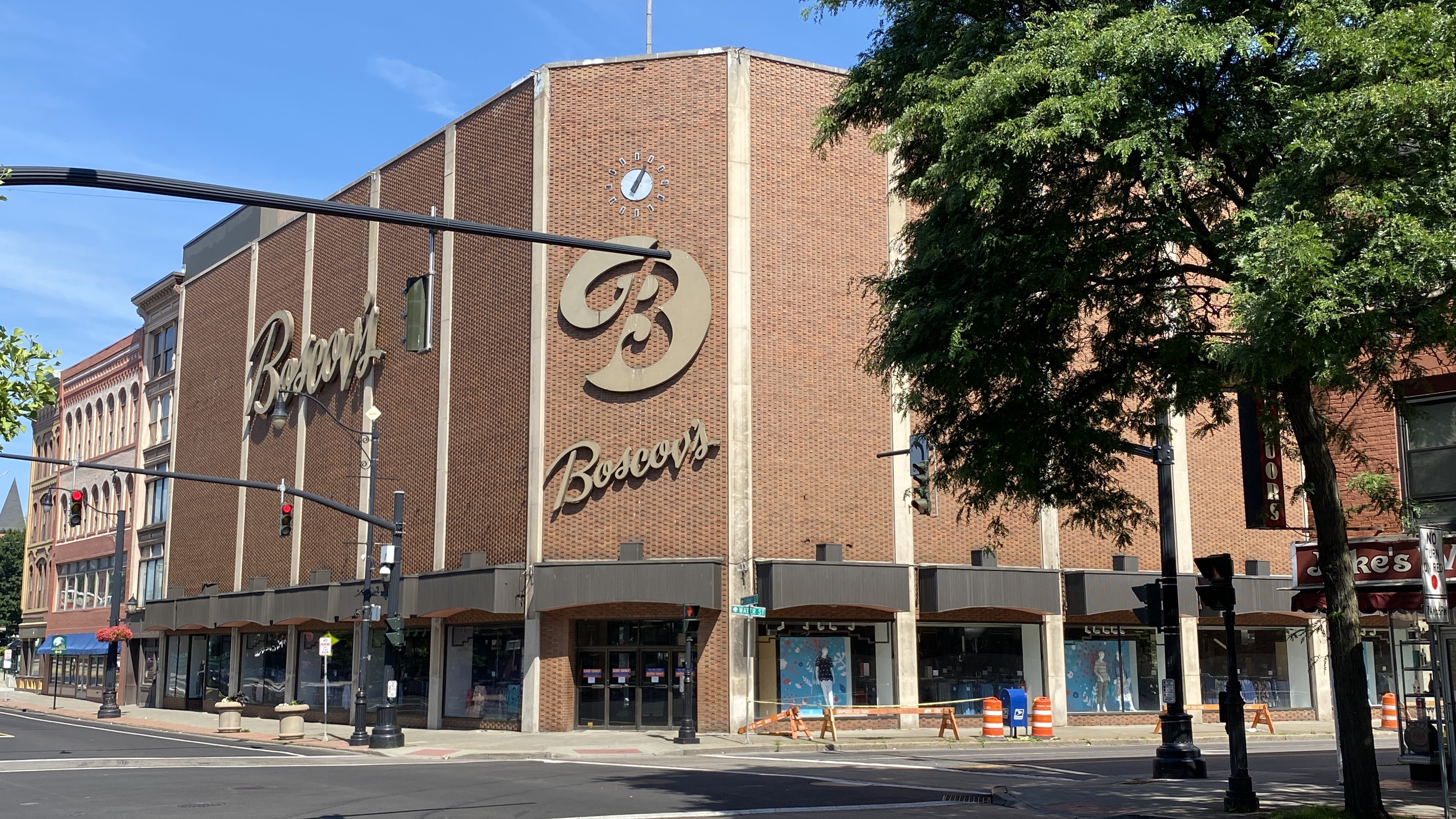
Fowler's building in Binghamton, New York today as a Boscov's
