= Laurel Mall (Pennsylvania) =

Shopping mall near Hazleton, Pennsylvania, U.S.

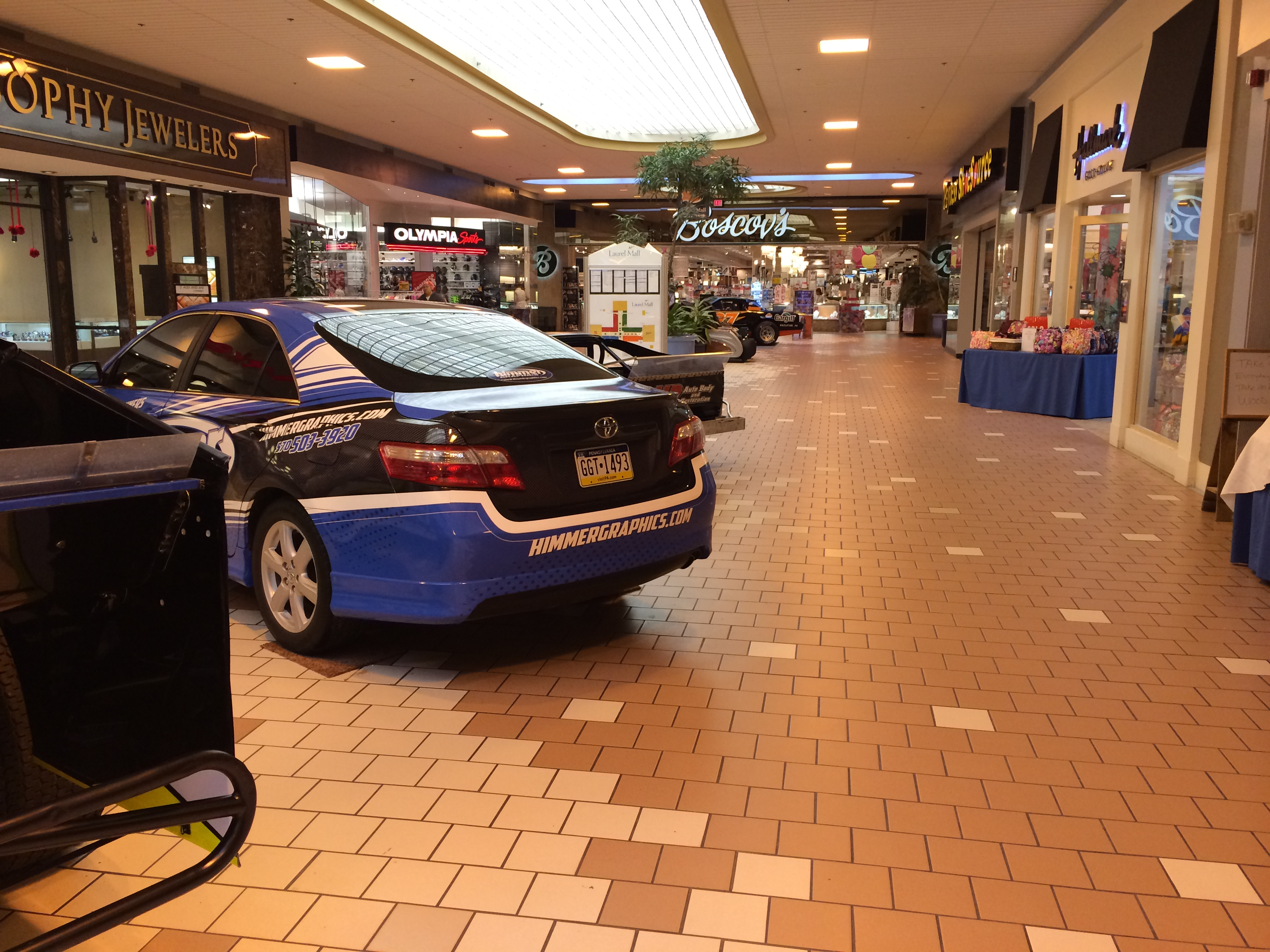
- The Boscov's wing in February 2015
- Location: Hazle Township, Pennsylvania, U.S.
- Coordinates: 40.98419°N 76.01670°W
- Address: 106 Laurel Mall Road, Hazle Township, Pennsylvania, U.S.
- Opened: 1973
- Developer: Associates of the Eighties
- Manager: Lexington Realty International
- Num. of stores: 60
- Num. of anchor tenants: 3
- Floor area: 610,000 square feet (57,000 m^{2})
- Floors: 1 (2 in Boscov's)
- Public transit: HPT bus: 10, 90, 95, 100, 110
- Website: thelaurelmall.com

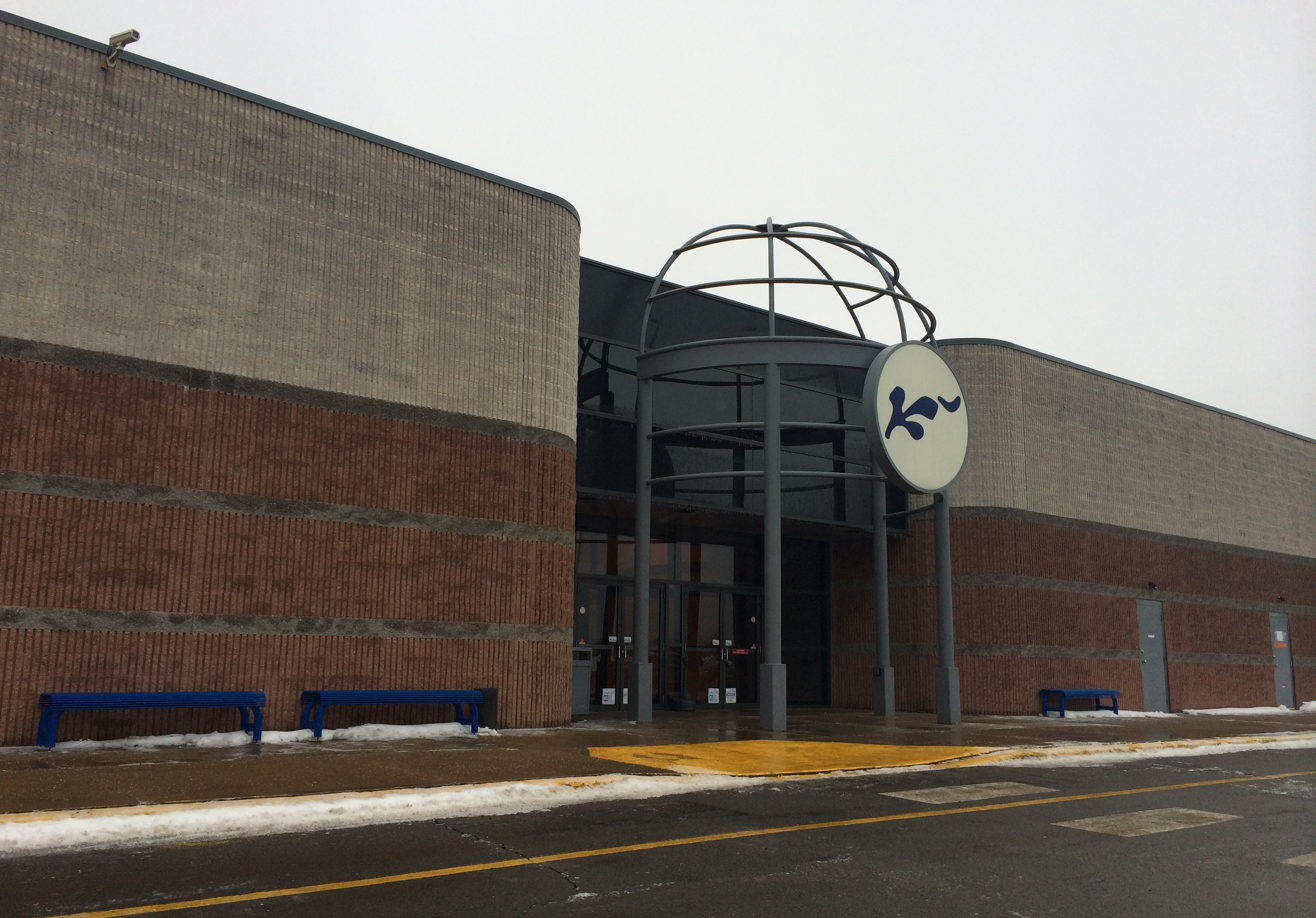
Entrance to Laurel Mall in February 2015

Laurel Mall is a shopping mall which opened in 1973 just northwest of Hazleton, Pennsylvania, United States. It features three current anchor stores, Boscov's, Dunham's Sports with one anchor jointly occupied by Planet Fitness and Hobby Lobby; TJ Maxx is a junior anchor. 10-theater Regal Cinemas and Aldi are outparcels. The mall is managed by Lexington Realty.

== History ==
=== 20th century ===
Opened in 1973, the mall was developed by Associates of the Eighties. It initially featured two anchor stores: Zayre at the west end, and "Fowler, Dick, and Walker, the Boston Store" at the east end. Original tenants included GNC, Hickory Farms, Karmelkorn, Waldenbooks, Rea & Derrick Drugstore, and an A&P supermarket, of which only GNC remains and moved within the mall in 2016. Boscov's took over the Fowler, Dick & Walker store in 1981, and Zayre sold to Ames in 1989.

Construction of a new wing anchored by JCPenney began in 1993. Also that year, the Ames store closed and began conversion to a Kmart, which opened in September 1994.

Boscov's expanded by 52,800 square feet (4,910 m^{2}) in 1994, and the mall interior was renovated with skylights and new flooring. McCrory Stores closed at the mall in 1995. One year later, Ben Franklin Crafts replaced it. The space is now Old Navy. A Hoyts movie theater opened next to the mall in 1998.

=== 21st century ===
In July 2005, the mall was sold by PREIT to Laurel Mall, LLC for $33.5 million, including assumed debt of $22.6 million. In August 2008, radio station WBHT sponsored a performance by the boy band Menudo at Laurel Mall.

On January 15, 2014, it was announced that the JCPenney store would be closing as part of a plan to close 33 locations nationwide.

In 2014, Laurel Mall, LLC changed management companies from LMS Realty to Lexington Realty International. On May 6, 2015, it was announced that Dunham's Sports would be opening in the former JCPenney space. It opened on October 16, 2015. In August 2016, a marketing manager claimed 96.6 percent capacity, and construction was underway for TJ Maxx to "take up almost the entire northwest corner of the mall" in November. Sears Holdings announced in January 2018 that it would be closing 64 Kmart stores, including the one at Laurel Mall in early April 2018.

A Planet Fitness location was announced for 2020; construction was delayed by the COVID-19 pandemic, and not completed until the end of the year, with the exercise equipment being put into place just before its early 2021 opening. A Hobby Lobby franchise opened in January 2021.
