= Princeton Shopping Center =

Shopping mall in New Jersey

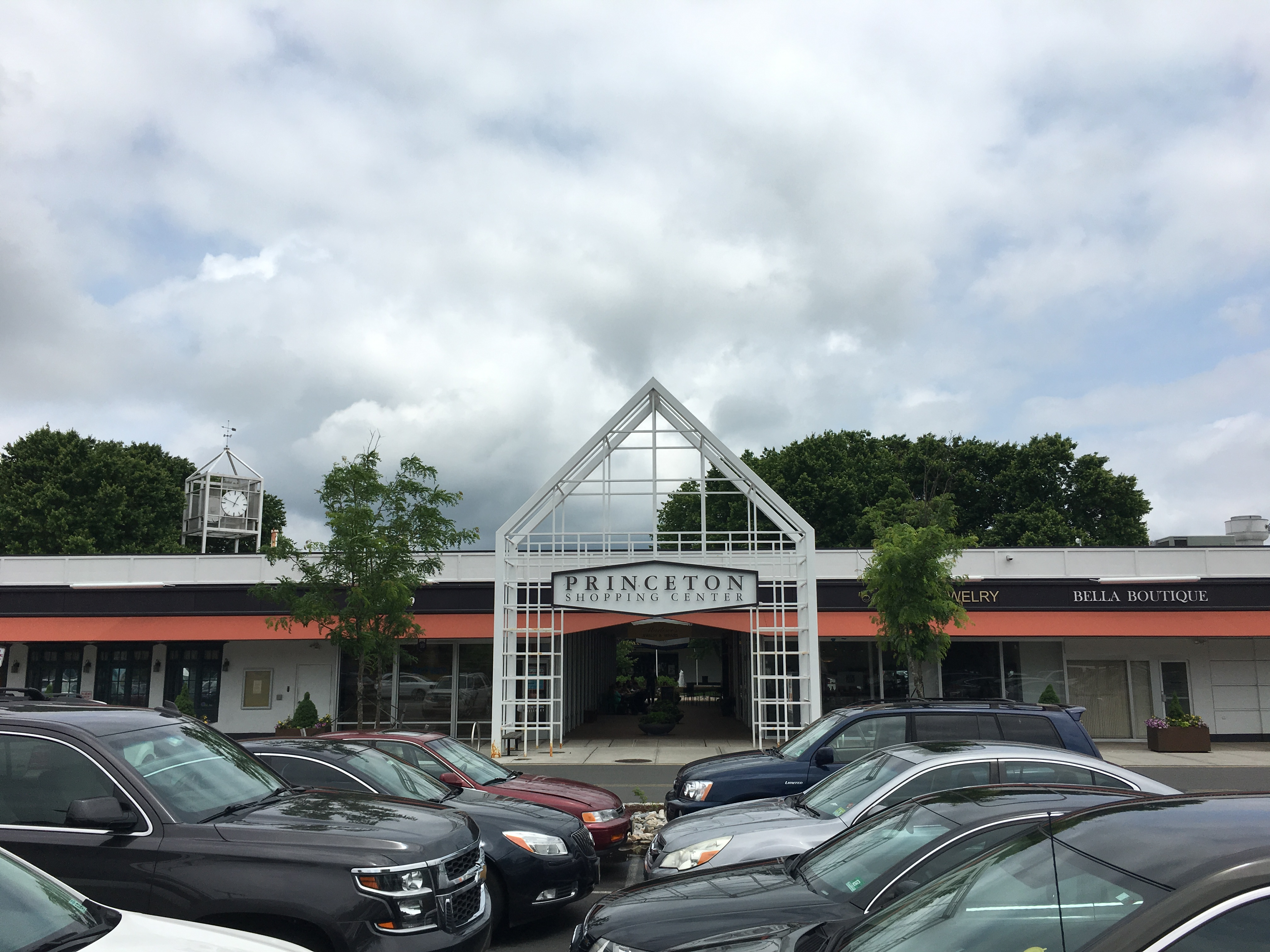
- Entrance gate of the center, 2018
- Location: Princeton, New Jersey, U.S.
- Coordinates: 40°21′49″N 74°39′04″W
- Opened: 1954
- Developer: Theodore Potts
- Owner: Edens
- Num. of stores: around 40
- Num. of anchor tenants: 1
- Floor area: 255,000 square feet (23,700 square meters)
- Floors: 1 overall 2 in anchor store
- Website: www.princetonshoppingcenter.com

The Princeton Shopping Center is an open-air shopping mall in Princeton, New Jersey.

Encompassing 255,000 square feet (23,700 square meters) and around fifty stores and restaurants, the center is known for its distinctive mid-century design. It is also known for its community-based atmosphere and appeal. It exists as a rectangular series of low-profile, single-story structures with roofs that protrude to give shelter walkways, with a large open courtyard in the middle. At one end is a two-level anchor store that has housed Bamberger's, Epstein's and McCaffrey's Food Markets in turn. It has a large surrounding parking area, as well as a bus stop that is serviced by both New Jersey Transit and Princeton's Muni bus. Its distinctive layout features expansive entrances, over 40 local and national retailers, and a beautifully landscaped two-acre courtyard often referred to as “the living room of Princeton.”

The center has long featured a weekly concert series held in its courtyard during summers. As Princeton's Town Topics newspaper has noted, the relaxed atmosphere but still well-populated nature of the center has attracted people to it: "the Shopping Center is a proven anomaly ... the open-air, California-style facility, unlike most malls and front-lot strip malls, is being celebrated in a time when suburban developmental stylings are perhaps not necessarily in style."

== History ==
The center was built in the Princeton Township portion of the Princeton area (in the era when it was a distinct entity, before merging with Borough of Princeton in 2013). The developer was Theodore Potts, who in 1950 obtained township planning approval for the project. The project overall encompassed 28 acres (11 ha), with 8 acres (3.2 ha) going to an adjacent recreational area, now known as Grover Park.

Construction of the anchor store, then known under the name L. Bamberger & Co., began in May 1951. At that point Bamberger only had stores in Newark and Morristown; another in Plainfield was also in development at that point. When it opened on September 9, 1954, Bamberger's occupied two stories and 60,000 square feet, significantly smaller than other Bamberger's locations. As a result, it only carried a portion of the lines that the larger stores had, such as the flagship location in Newark; among the lines missing were furniture, glass, and silver. Nevertheless, Bamberger's officials always liked the store and kept it going. The Bamberger's there finally closed in 1980, in part because a large Bamberger's had opened as an anchor store at Quaker Bridge Mall, only five miles away, in 1976.

It was replaced in the Princeton Shopping Center later that year by Epstein's, a New Jersey family department store chain whose generally smaller size and orientation towards personalized service was a better fit for the center. Epstein's also had the belief that it was better to be a bigger store in a smallish center, as opposed to being a run-of-the-mill store in a large mall. Epstein's moved out in 1990, relocating to the Princeton MarketFair.

It was replaced in 1992 on the first floor of the anchor building by McCaffrey's Food Markets, a regional chain of supermarkets in southeastern Pennsylvania and west-central New Jersey. McCaffrey's became what one writer termed the "go-to supermarket" in the immediate area. The second floor of the building has a McCaffrey's eating area and also the locations of a yoga facility, a ballet school for youngsters, and other offices.

For many years the center was owned by George Comfort & Sons, a New York-based company. The center underwent a renovation in 2007, under the supervision of Rosen Johnson Architects. The redoing of the center involved the digging up and replacing many of the courtyard's trees and gardens, to the consternation of some longtime shoppers.

In 2012, the center was sold to Edens, a South Carolina-based company, which pledged to keep up the community atmosphere which had made the center a success.

== Gallery ==
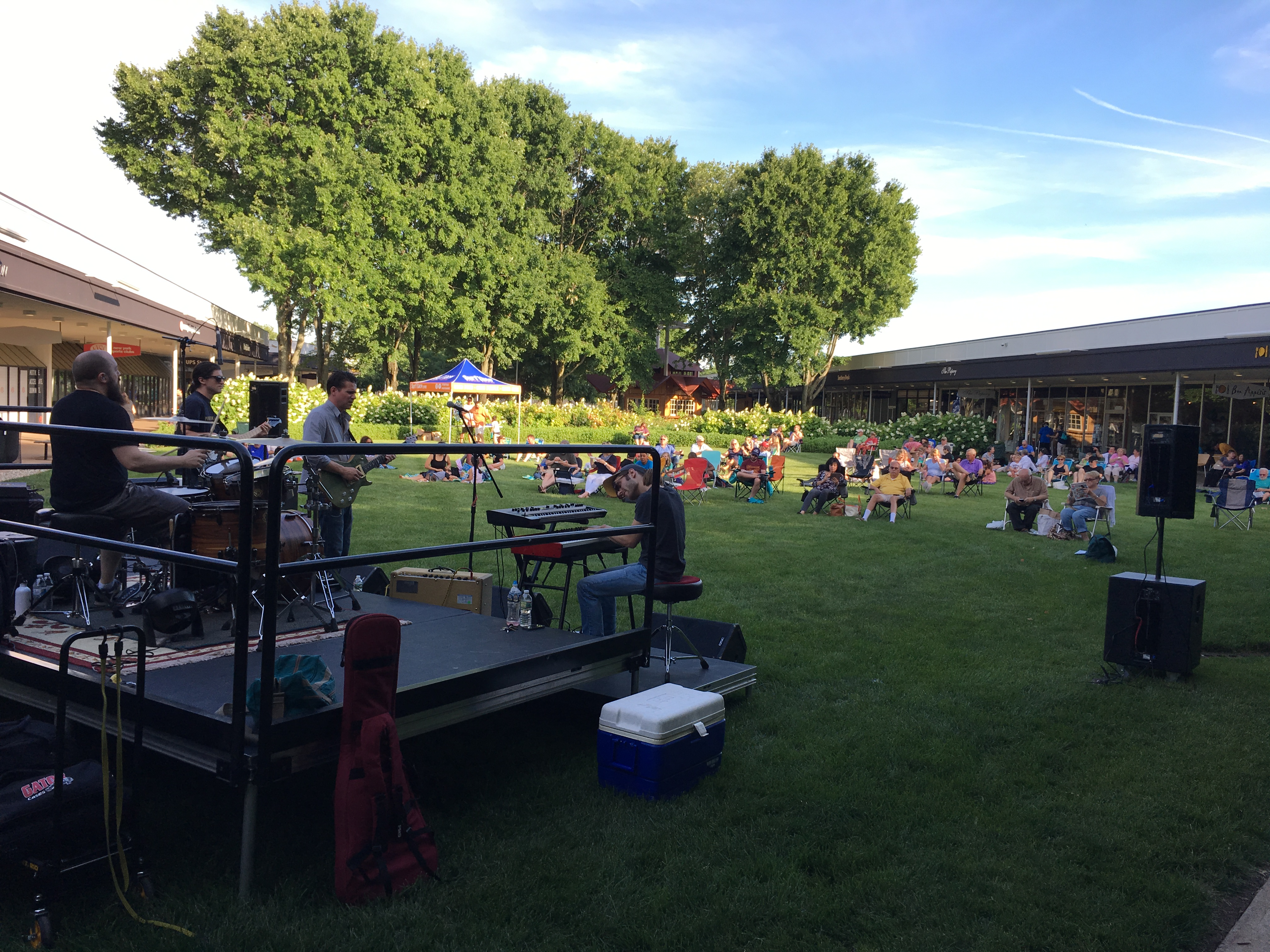
A summer concert in the courtyard of the center

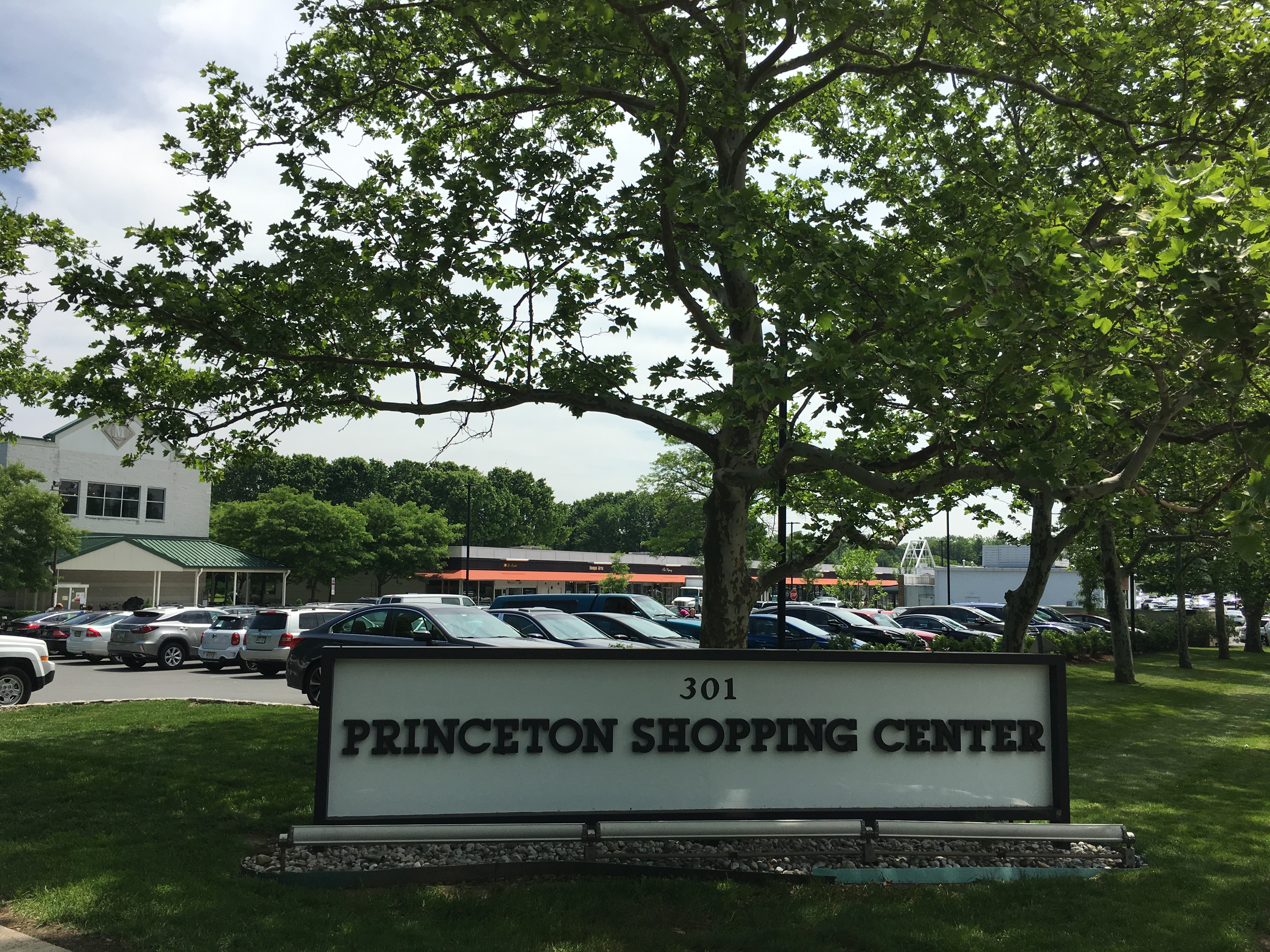
Street entrance to the center; the two-story anchor building is seen on the left

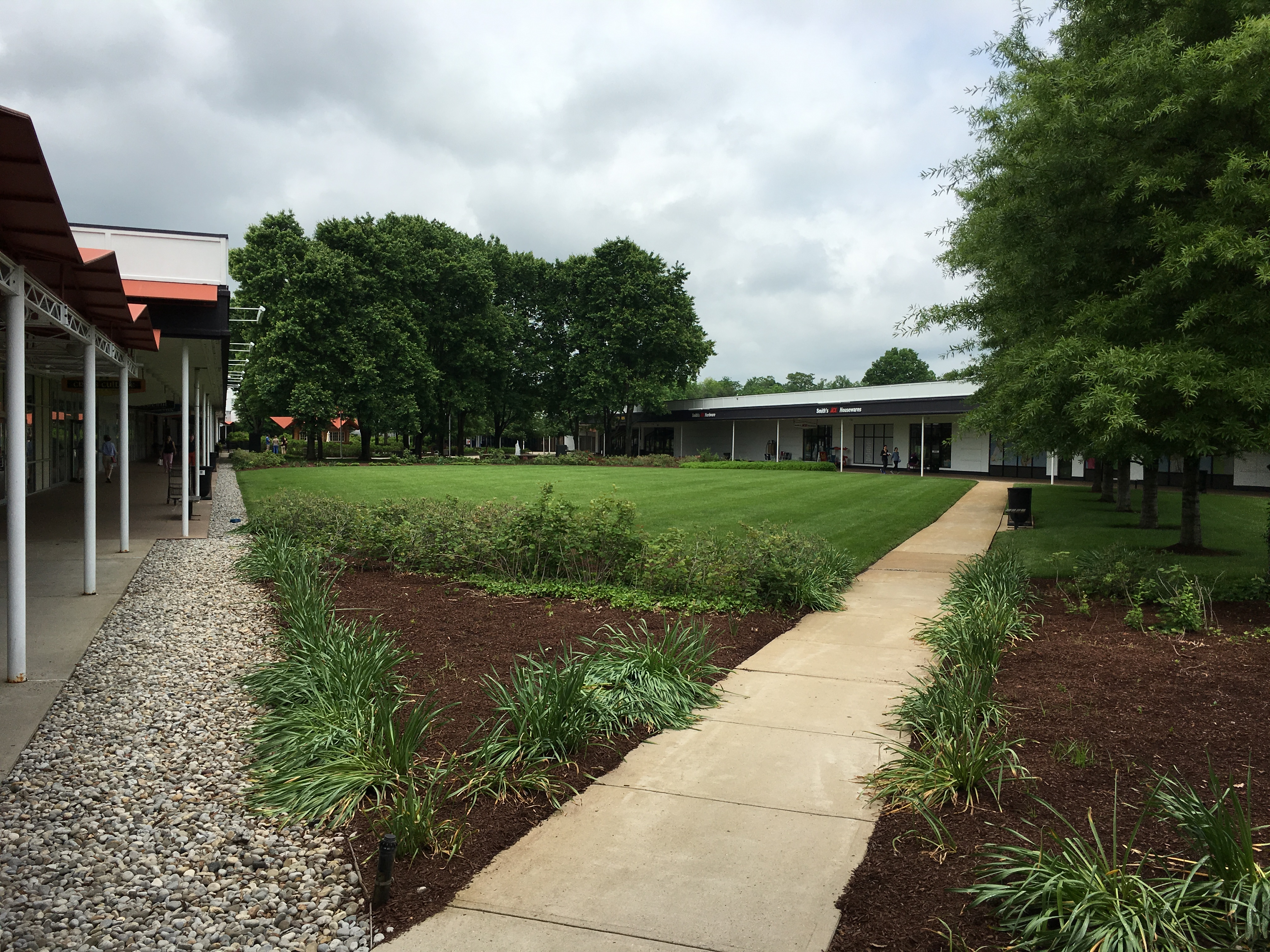
The inner courtyard of the center and its covered walkways
