= Cumberland Mall (New Jersey) =

- Location: Vineland, New Jersey, United States
- Coordinates: 39.432°N 75.036°W
- Opened: October 21, 1973
- Developer: Rubin Organization
- Owner: Summit Properties USA
- Num. of anchor tenants: 5 / 1 Distribution Center
- Floor area: 941,148 square feet (87,435.5 m^{2})
- Floors: 1
- Parking: Parking lot
- Public transit: NJ Transit bus: 313, 553
- Website: cumberlandmallnj.com

Cumberland Mall is a shopping mall located in Vineland, New Jersey, located on Route 47 (Delsea Drive) at Route 55 (exit 27).

Cumberland Mall is strategically positioned 25 miles (40 km) away from its nearest competitor, 45 miles (72 km) south of Philadelphia, Pennsylvania and on route to the Southern New Jersey Shore Points. Its anchor stores are Boscov's, and Dick's Sporting Goods occupying the former JCPenney. Other tenants in the mall include Marshalls, Michaels, Bed Bath & Beyond, Old Navy, and HomeGoods.

== History ==
The mall was built in 1973 by Rubin Organization. Its original anchor stores were Bradlees, Gaudio's, Pathmark, and Wilmington Dry Goods. Gaudio's became JCPenney, Pathmark became Toys "R" Us, and Wilmington Dry Goods became Value City. Despite the addition of these anchor stores, the mall's occupancy declined in the 1990s. A mall-wide renovation at the end of the decade added Boscov's and expanded JCPenney while reconfiguring the main mall concourse. The former Bradlees was subdivided, and The Home Depot and Regal Cinemas were added on outparcels in 1998.

In 2003, BJ's Wholesale Club opened in the mall's surrounding area, followed by Best Buy in 2006. After Value City went out of business in 2009, its space became Burlington Coat Factory.

In January 2015, it was announced the JCPenney store was closing as part of a plan to close 39 underperforming stores nationwide.

In 2018 it was announced that the Bed Bath and Beyond store, which had been a tenant at the mall since 2002, was going to close due to leasing issues.

In 2021, Burlington, the former Value City, went out of business. The vacant department store is leased by Power Warehouse which is a distribution center that handles outgoing orders for businesses inside of the mall, as well as outside.

In November 2022, PREIT sold Cumberland Mall to Kohan Retail Investment Group.

In 2024, Animal Paradise Gyms opened in a storefront that once housed a Toys “R” Us and Babies “R” Us store.
