= The Quarter at Tropicana =

Coordinates: 39.3529°N 74.4449°W

Quarter at Tropicana

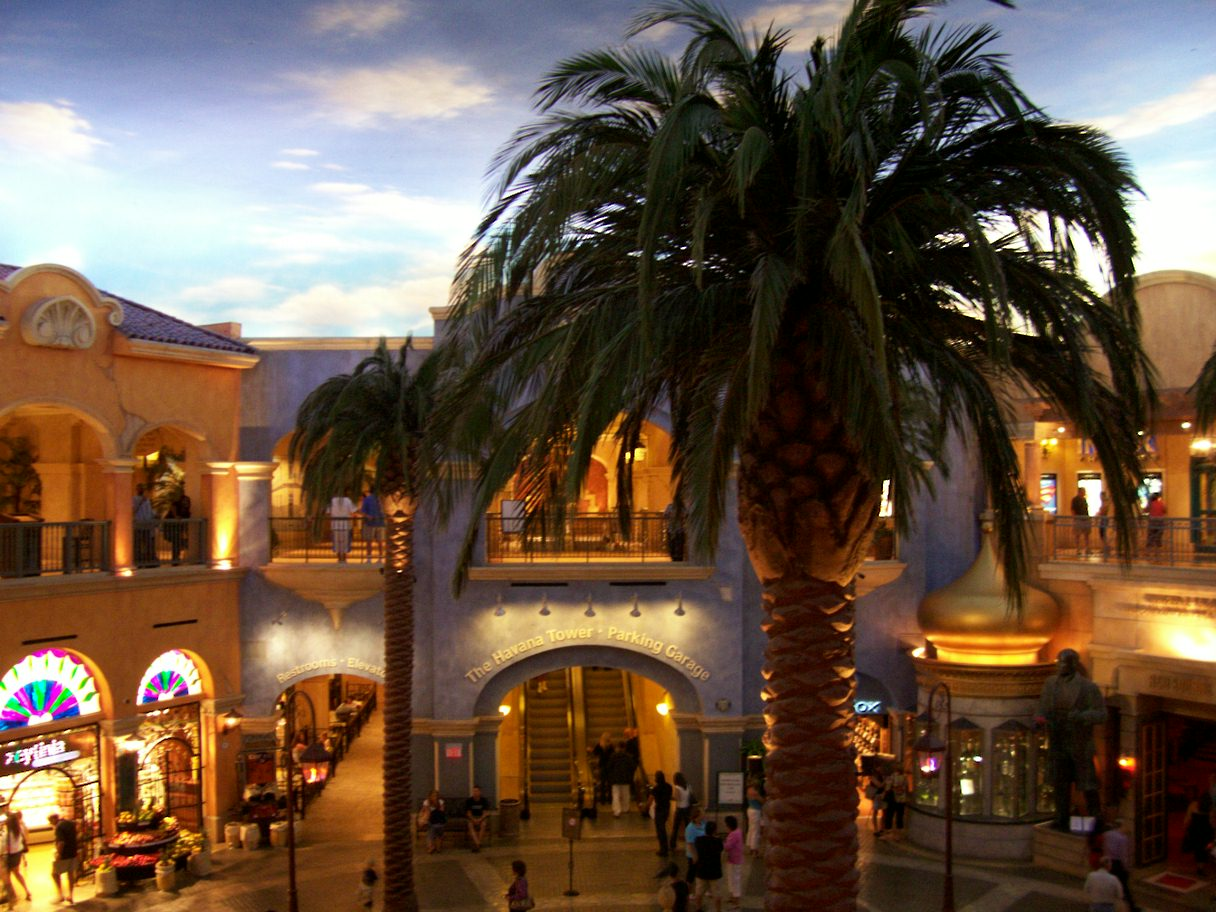
- Interior
- Location: Atlantic City, New Jersey, United States
- Opened: November 23, 2004
- Developer: Aztar Corporation
- Manager: Caesars Entertainment (2020)
- Owner: Caesars Entertainment (2020), Gaming and Leisure Properties
- Num. of stores: 40+
- Floors: 2 (3 counting some Restaurants and Gym)
- Parking: Havana Tower Parking garage
- Website: www.tropicana.net

The Quarter at Tropicana is an Old Havana-themed enclosed shopping mall located at the Tropicana Casino & Resort Atlantic City in Atlantic City, New Jersey. It contains over 40 stores, nine restaurants, eleven nightclubs, and a spa.

== History ==
The dining and retail complex was built along with a new 502-room hotel tower expansion at the Tropicana and a parking garage. With a total construction cost of $280 million, The Quarter officially opened on November 23, 2004. In 2015, Tropicana added more shops into the Quarter.
