= MarketFair =

MarketFair Mall
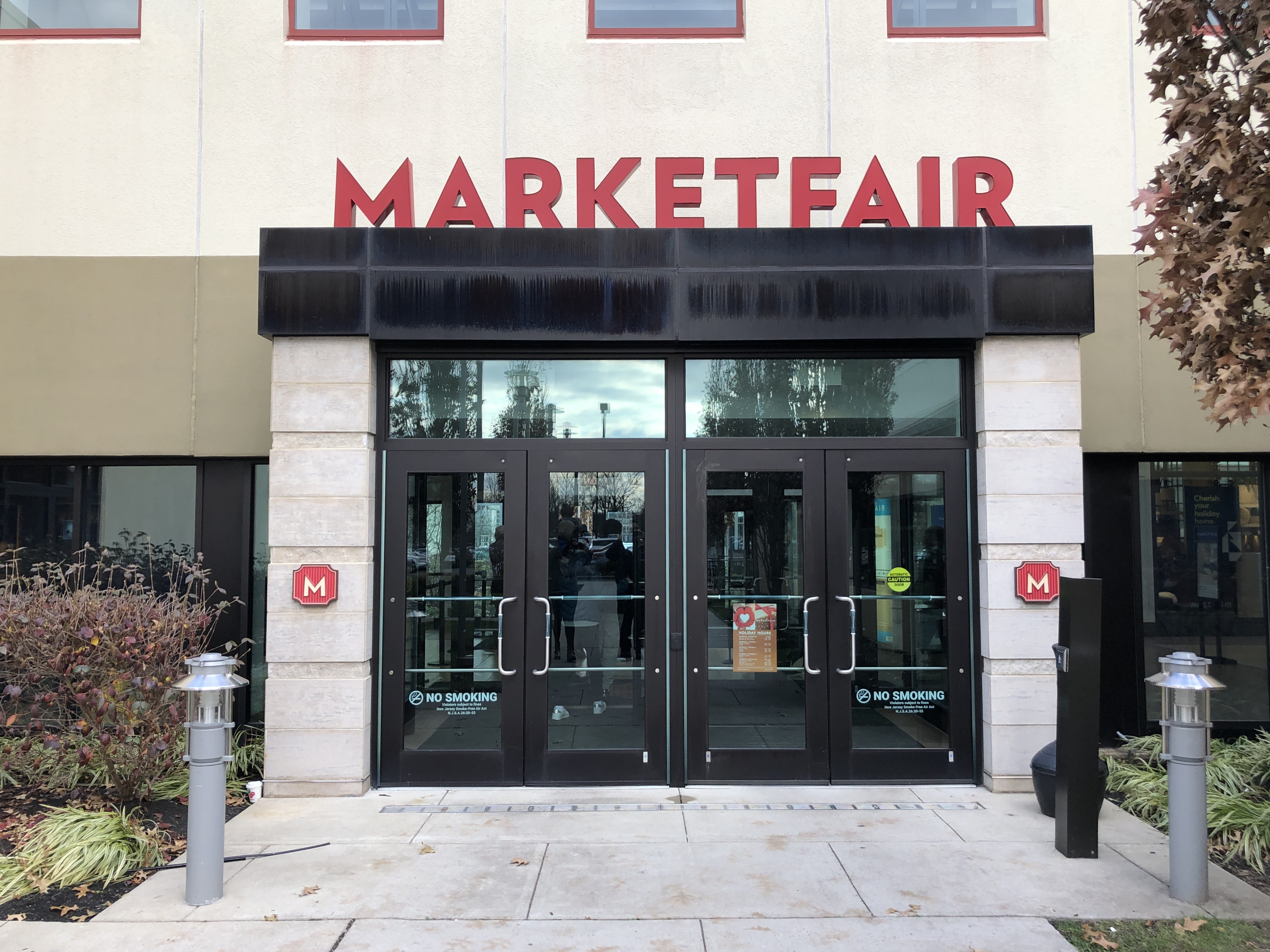
- Entrance to MarketFair Mall in 2022
- Location: West Windsor, New Jersey
- Coordinates: 40.314793°N 74.660955°W
- Address: 3535 U.S. 1, Princeton, NJ
- Opened: August 1987; 39 years ago
- Developer: JMB-Federated Realty Associates
- Manager: Centennial Real Estate Management
- Owner: Centennial Real Estate Management
- Num. of stores: 38
- Num. of anchor tenants: 4
- Floors: 1
- Public transit: NJ Transit bus: 600, 605
- Website: marketfairshoppes.com

MarketFair (also referred to as MarketFair Mall, Princeton MarketFair, or MarketFair Shoppes) is a shopping mall in West Windsor, New Jersey, with a Princeton mailing address. With a gross leasable area of 240,000 square feet (22,000 m^{2}), the mall is located along U.S. Route 1, between New York City and Philadelphia. About 83,000 cars pass by every day. The anchor stores are AMC Theatres, Pottery Barn, LensCrafters, and Barnes & Noble.

== History ==
MarketFair was built in 1987 by JMB-Federated Realty Associates (now Urban Retail Properties), and is managed by Centennial. The one-story mall was positioned as a fashion center. Tenants included The Limited, Petite Sophisticate, Structure. US$12 million was put into repositioning and updating MarketFair since 1996, including $2 million spent renovating the food court. By July 2001, sales had increased 50%, or $20 million, to $61 million under the new management.

== Tenants ==
There are about 38 different establishments in the mall. Home furnishings accounts for a large part of the center’s mix. The mall is distinguished by its assortment of specialty shops, such as Williams Sonoma, and Pottery Barn. Restaurants featured in the mall include: Tommy’s Tavern + Tap (opened on December 7, 2020; replaced Big Fish Seafood Bistro), P.F. Chang's. Recent changes to the mall include the addition of a new Banana Republic concept store, construction for a West Elm, renovation of its Barnes & Noble, and the new additions of Seasons 52, Bahama Breeze, and Qdoba, that all opened in Fall 2013. There is also a ten-screen AMC Theatres.

The mall's regular clientele tend to be affluent, educated consumers with an average household income of $120,000.

== Gallery ==
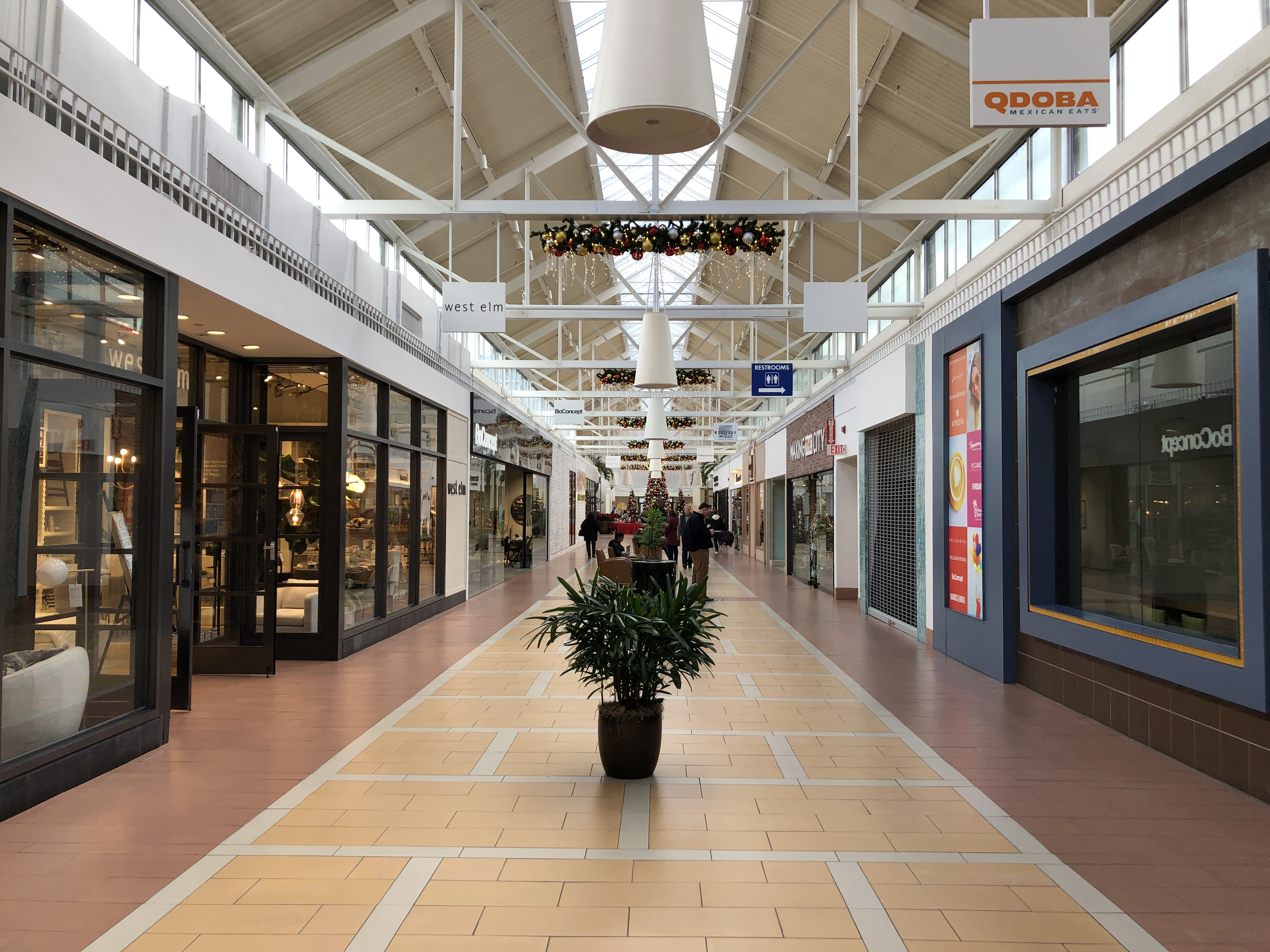

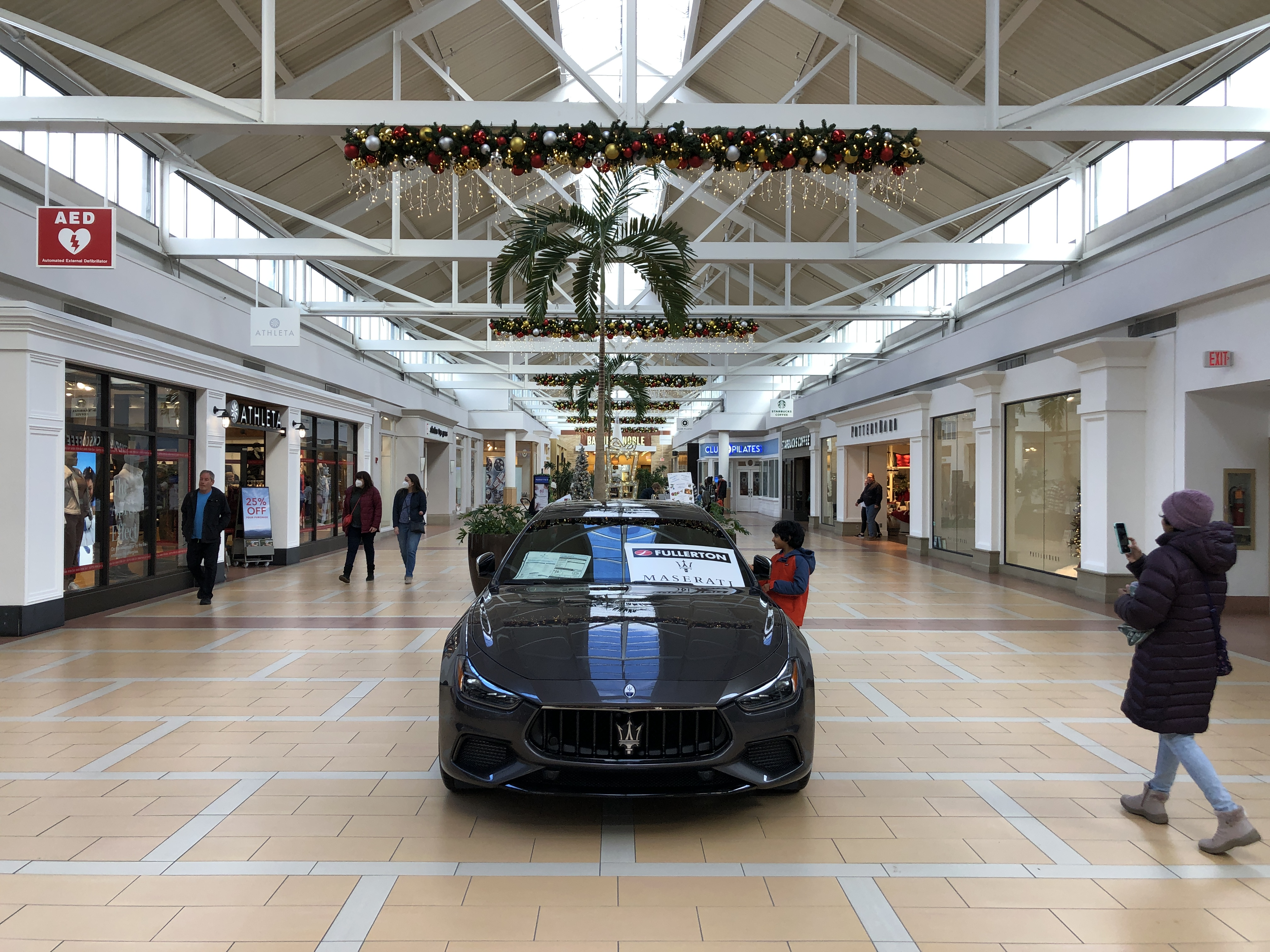
