= Menlo Park Mall =

Shopping mall in Edison, New Jersey

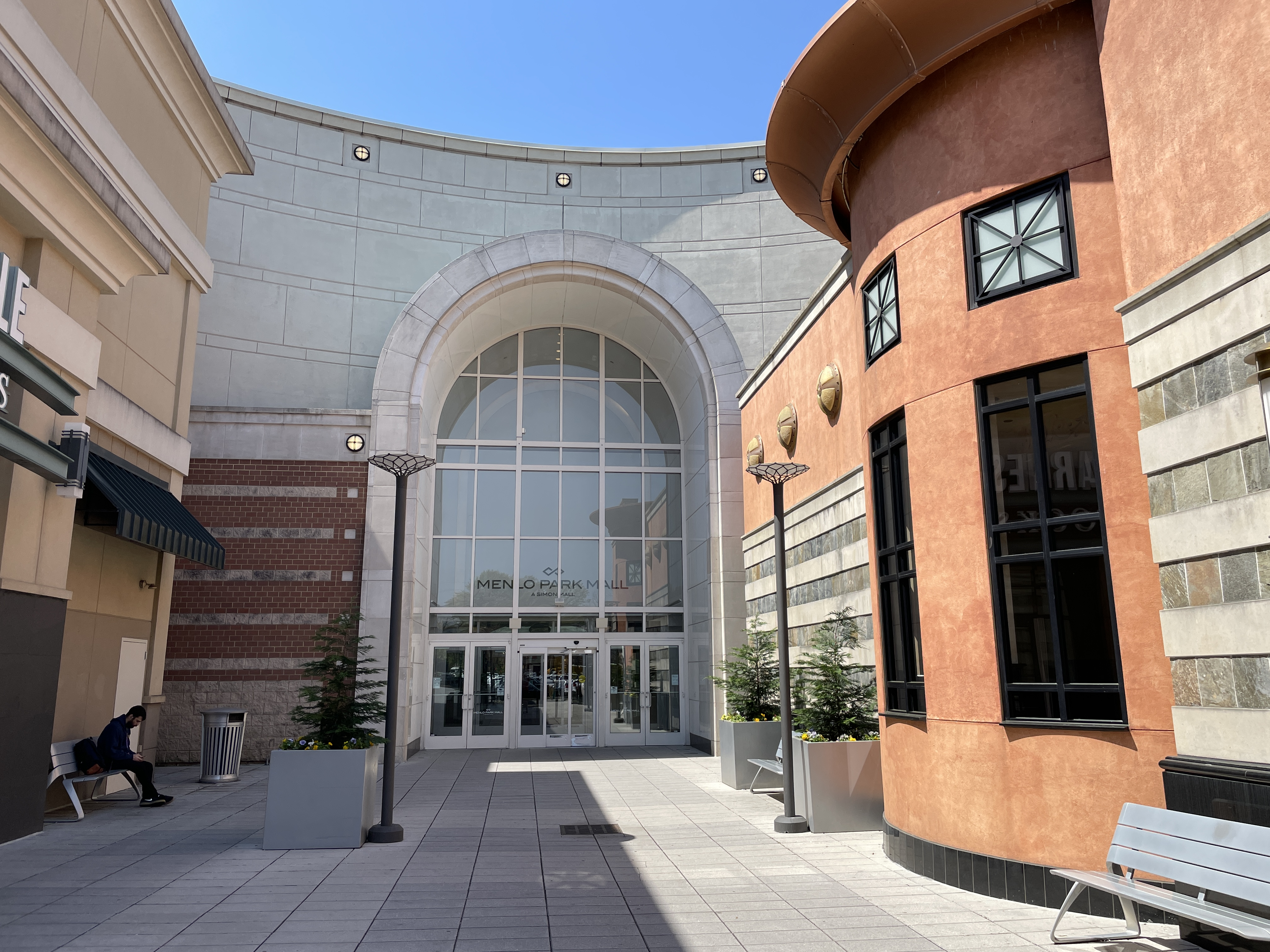
- Entrance to Menlo Park Mall
- Location: 55 Parsonage Road; Edison, New Jersey 08837; US
- Coordinates: 40.53833°N 74.37861°W
- Opened: September 1959 (renovated/enclosed in 1966–1967 and expanded in 1990–1991 and renovated in 2015)
- Developer: Lomen Construction
- Manager: Simon Property Group
- Owner: Simon Property Group
- Architect: RTKL Associates
- Num. of stores: 156
- Num. of anchor tenants: 6
- Floor area: 1,332,132 sq ft (123,759.1 m^{2})
- Floors: 2 (3 in Macy's and Nordstrom, 1 in Round1)
- Public transit: NJ Transit bus: 810
- Website: simon.com/mall/menlo-park-mall

Menlo Park Mall is a two-level super-regional shopping mall, located on U.S. Route 1 and Parsonage Road in Edison, New Jersey. The mall has a gross leasable area of 1,332,132 sq ft (123,759.1 m^{2}) and is owned and managed by Simon Property Group.

== History ==
The Menlo Park Shopping Center opened in September 1959, as an open-air complex. It was developed and constructed by Abraham Sommer and Sigmund Sommer, developers from Iselin, New Jersey. It was named after the Menlo Park area of Edison, also the site of Thomas Edison's former laboratory location. The structure was fully enclosed between June 1966 and December 1967. After the remodeling, it was renamed Menlo Park Mall, a prominent retail hub in Edison, New Jersey, is part of Simon Property Group's extensive portfolio of over 200 properties in the United States, highlighting its significance within the regional shopping landscape.

The original center was anchored by Bamberger's, JCPenney, Woolworth as well as two grocery stores: ShopRite and Safeway. Montgomery Ward opened in January 1962. The Montgomery Ward space was taken over by Alexander's in 1972. Bamberger's was rebranded by Macy's in 1986. After Alexander's went out of business in 1988, the mall was able to secure the second Nordstrom in New Jersey, but changes had to be made to prepare for the opening.

Menlo Park partially enclosed into an air conditioned mall in 1967, the first in Central New Jersey.The stores to the East, West and South of Bamberger's remained open air. Most of the mall was closed from 1990 to 1991, when it underwent a significant renovation and expansion that changed it from a single-story structure into its current two-story form. In expanding and fitting into the space, the new Menlo Park Mall was built on an angle with the vertex occurring at center court. The renovated Menlo Park Mall was also changed to have galleria style skylights, domed fountain courts, marble flooring, dramatic lighting, sculptures and a large, skylit food court featuring trees and sculptures, designed to look like a formal garden. The new mall was designed by architecture firm RTKL Associates Inc. of Dallas, Texas. Two parking decks were also added, as was a 12-screen Cineplex Odeon movie theater which replaced the smaller Menlo Park Cinema on Route 1. Cineplex was later replaced by an AMC Dine-In Theater. Macy's was the only store to remain open during the primary expansion. Nordstrom officially opened to the public at Menlo Park Mall on September 27, 1991. Linens 'N Things also opened with the new mall in 1991. The anchor and it's wing was only one level.

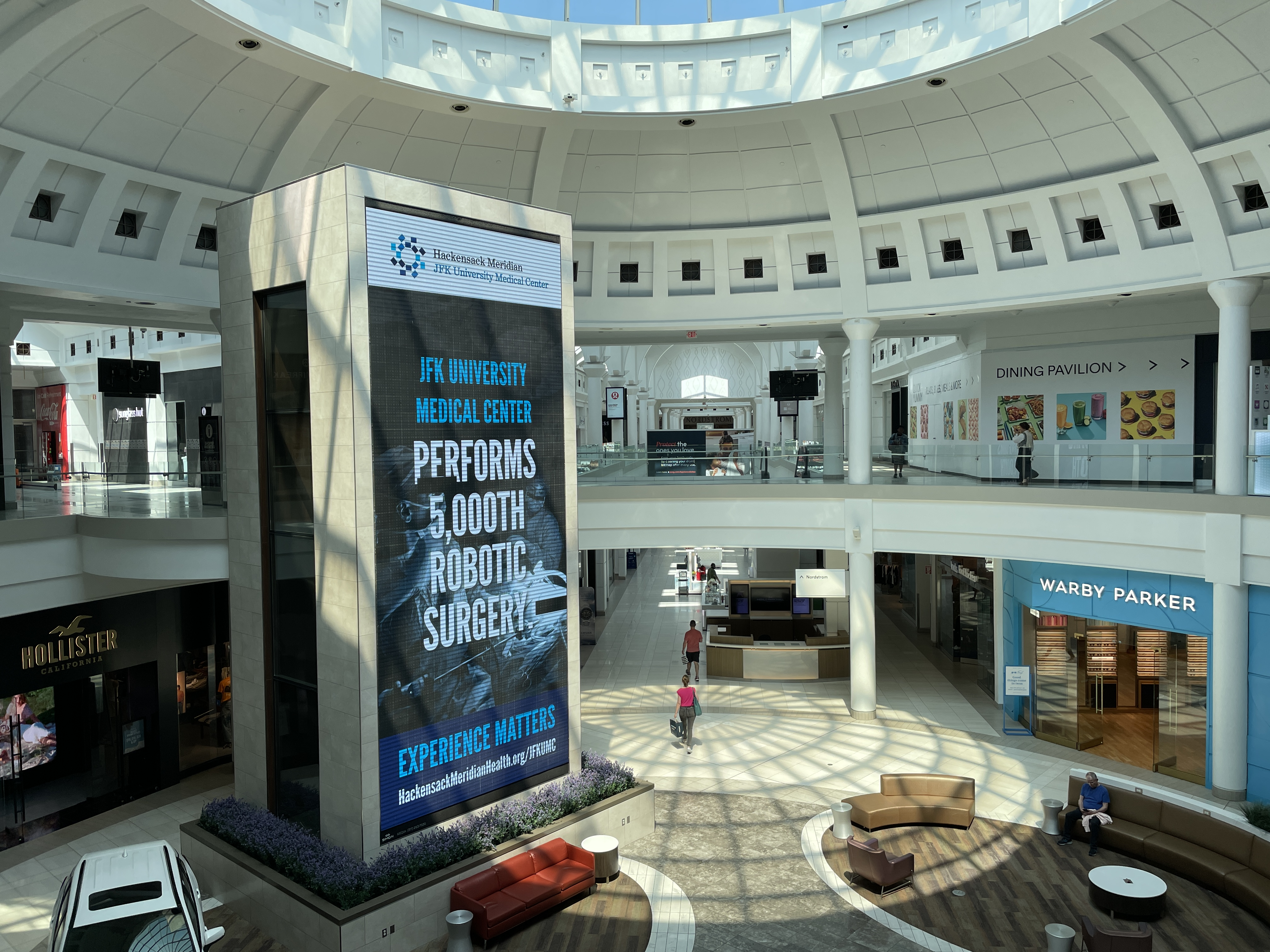
Center court of Menlo Park Mall

On March 9, 1997, Target Greatland opened across the street from the mall. Rainforest Cafe opened on September 17, 1998, near Linens 'N Things. The restaurant closed down on February 19, 2025. Linens 'N Things closed around 2001 and relocated to Woodbridge Crossing, a strip mall anchored by The Great Indoors. Steve & Barry's opened in 2005 and replaced Linens 'N Things as the third anchor. They left after their liquidation in 2008. Fortunoff Backyard Store took over the old space.

On January 27, 2003, the Cheesecake Factory opened its doors for the first time. On June 4 of the same year, Barnes & Noble opened to guests.

In 2014, Smashburger opened along with an upgrade to the food court.

In 2015, a renovation project was started which removed such features as the central fountain and trees. The food court's raised platform, sculptures, and trees were also removed, and the food court was renamed Dining Pavilion. Fortunoff Backyard Store also left the mall in 2015 and became a college named Soller College. That also left the mall.

On September 22, 2018, a Disney Junior themed kids zone opened near Nordstrom. On December 15th, 2024, The Jersey Strong gym closed permanently due to the lease not being renewed. The space currently sits vacant. In late 2024, it was confirmed that Round 1 would open in the southwest wing of Menlo Park Mall, taking over the former Rainforest Cafe as well as the building last used by Sollers College. On February 19, 2025, the Rainforest Cafe closed permanently due to the lease not being renewed. Round 1 opened on February 7, 2026.
