= Boscov's =

American regional department store

Boscov's, LLC

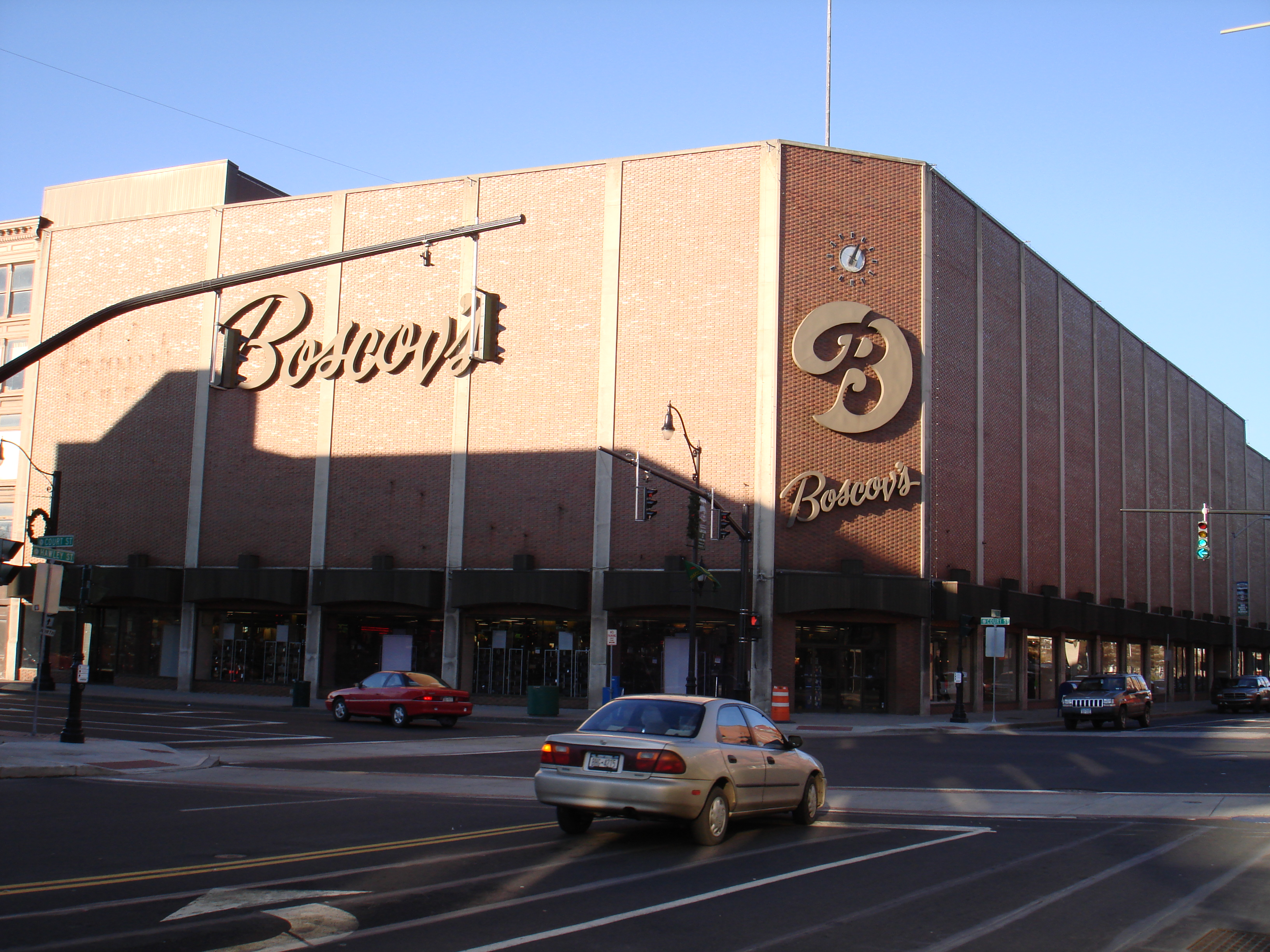
- Exterior of the flagship Boscov's store in Binghamton, New York (2006)
- Type: Private
- Industry: Retail
- Genre: Department stores
- Founded: 1914; 112 years ago in Reading, Pennsylvania, United States
- Founder: Solomon Boscov
- Headquarters: Exeter Township, Pennsylvania, United States
- Number of locations: 51 (2025)
- Area served: Northeast
- Key people: Jim Boscov (chairman and CEO)
- Products: Clothing; footwear; bedding; furniture; jewelry; beauty products; candy; household goods; toys/games; decor; small appliances
- Revenue: US$1.5 billion (2021)
- Owner: Boscov family
- Number of employees: 8,300 (2021)
- Website: boscovs.com

Boscov's, LLC is an American department store chain founded in 1914 by Solomon Boscov. It is headquartered in Exeter Township, Pennsylvania, and has its flagship store in Binghamton, New York.

== History ==
Solomon "Sol" Boscov was of Jewish descent. He emigrated from Russia to Reading, Pennsylvania, in 1911. He had $1.37 in cash (equivalent to $47 in 2025) on arrival in the United States. He worked as a traveling salesman with an initial $8 worth of merchandise. Because he spoke Yiddish, he was able to converse with people in Berks County who spoke Pennsylvania Dutch. Boscov's fortunes changed in 1914 when he opened the first Boscov's store at 9th and Pike streets in Reading. A Pennsylvania Historical Marker commemorating Solomon Boscov stands at the site of the original store.

Boscov's began expanding throughout suburban Reading in the 1960s, with Boscov's West in Sinking Spring opening in 1962 and Boscov's North at the Reading Fairgrounds in Muhlenberg Township in 1965. Boscov's East along 9th Street in Reading was destroyed by fire in February 1967 and was replaced by a new Boscov's East in Exeter Township nine months later. Boscov's West was destroyed by fire in November 1967 and reopened twelve months later.

By the end of 1968, Boscov's had five stores, 2,200 workers, and annual sales exceeding $50 million. Solomon Boscov retired and was succeeded by his son Albert "Albie" Boscov as the head of the company in 1960. The first Boscov's outside of Berks County opened at the Lebanon Valley Mall in Lebanon, Pennsylvania, in 1972. Boscov's bought Fowler, Dick and Walker, the Boston Store in 1980. One of Wilkes-Barre's last remaining downtown department stores, it was Boscov's first multi-story store.

Boscov's opened its first location outside Pennsylvania at the Dover Mall in Dover, Delaware, in 1982. Boscov's entered the Philadelphia market directly in the late 1980s by opening Ports of the World stores which were re-branded as Boscov's in the 1990s. In 1983, Boscov's leased the dormant Fowler's building in downtown Binghamton, New York; this store, with five retail floors, is the flagship of the Boscov's chain. In 2002, Boscov's opened at the Berkshire Mall in Wyomissing, replacing a Strawbridge's store. As a result, Boscov's West in Sinking Spring closed.

In 2006, Albert Boscov retired and his nephew Kenneth Lakin became chairman and chief executive. Lakin led an aggressive expansion, opening ten new stores by 2008. Boscov's acquired these locations from Federated Department Stores following its merger with The May Department Stores Company. The new stores opened just prior to the 2008 economic downturn and Boscov's filed for Chapter 11 bankruptcy. Albert Boscov came out of retirement and regained control of the company. As part of the bankruptcy, the new stores were shuttered, although two were later reopened. The company emerged from bankruptcy in September 2009.

Albert Boscov died from pancreatic cancer in 2017 at the age of 87. The chain is now headed by his nephew, Jim Boscov. Boscov's continuing success makes it regarded as somewhat of an "outlier" because many department store retailers have been pulling back on brick-and-mortar formats. Boscov's saw record sales of $1.2 billion in 2017. Since 2009, the chain continues to expand and plans to continue to open one store per year while investing in existing stores by renovating them. Their strategy typically involves taking over spaces previously occupied by JCPenney and Sears. Boscov's moved into the Providence Place mall in downtown Providence, Rhode Island in 2019. In 2021, Boscov's opened at Eastwood Mall in Niles, Ohio a year later than planned due to the COVID-19 pandemic. Boscov's 50th store, and the first to be located in West Virginia, opened in Bridgeport in 2023. Boscov's opened its 51st store in October 2025 at The Mall at Greece Ridge in Rochester. With this store opening, Boscov's surprassed its 2008 store count.

== Civic affairs and charitable giving ==
Location map as 2026

During the 1970s, Boscov's launched its "Friends Helping Friends" program, an annual fundraising event which raises $1 million per year for non-profit organizations.

=== Jazz festival ===
Boscov's sponsors the annual "Boscov's Berks Jazz Fest" which draws an estimated 40,000 people to Reading each year.

=== Thanksgiving Day Parade ===
When Gimbels went out of business in 1986, WPVI-TV and Boscov's took over the sponsorship of the Philadelphia Thanksgiving Day Parade. Boscov's remained as co-sponsor for over twenty years.
