= Maddalene =

Maddalene may refer to:

- Genovese & Maddalene, American architectural firm
- Herbert F. Maddalene, American architect

== See also ==
- Maddalena (disambiguation)
