= Herbert F. Maddalene =

American architect (born 1928)

- Born: January 28, 1928 (age 98); Jersey City, New Jersey, U.S.
- Occupation: Architect
- Known for: Partner in Genovese & Maddalene

Herbert F. Maddalene, AIA (born January 28, 1928) is an American architect who practiced in the mid to late-twentieth-century New York, New Jersey, and Massachusetts, as a partner in the under the architectural firm name Genovese & Maddalene.

== Personal life ==
Born in Jersey City, New Jersey, he earned his Bachelor of Architecture degree from the Carnegie Institute of Technology in 1952, where he was a member of Tau Sigma Delta. In 1970, he lived at 16 Vermont Drive, Paramus, New Jersey 07652. he lived in Ridgewood, New Jersey in the late 1970s.

== Architectural career ==
Maddalene joined the New Jersey Society of Architects, American Institute of Architects, in 1960, and was registered to practice in New York, New Jersey, Massachusetts, and Illinois. He was a member of the AIA American Institute of Architects Hudson chapter, and its president in 1958. With Anthony V. Genovese, Herbert F. Maddalene established his firm of Genovese & Maddalene at 175 Rock Rd, Glen Rock, New Jersey 07452 in 1963.

== Works as Genovese &. Maddalene ==
- 1967: Church of the Holy Name of Jesus (Rochester, New York)
- 1968: Advent Lutheran Church (Wyckoff, New Jersey)
- 1969: Our Lady of Good Counsel Church (Staten Island, New York)
- 1969: Our Lady of Mt. Carmel Church (Staten Island, New York)
- 1969: Church of the Nativity (Manhattan)
