= Anthony Vincent =

Anthony Vincent or Tony Vincent may refer to:

- Anthony Collins (composer) (1893–1963), British composer, born Anthony Vincent Benedictus Collins
- Anthony Vincent Genovese (born 1932), American architect
- Anthony Vincent (diplomat) (1939–1999), Canadian diplomat
- Anthony Vincent (musician) (born 1987), American musician and YouTuber
- Anthony Rizzo (born 1989), American baseball player, born Anthony Vincent Rizzo
- Tony Vincent (tennis) (1925–2023), American amateur tennis player
- Tony Vincent (born 1973), American actor and singer
