= Anthony Vincent Genovese =

American architect (born 1932)

- Born: February 25, 1932; Union City, New Jersey
- Occupation: Architect
- Known for: Partner in Genovese & Maddalene Principal architect: Genovese Associates, Inc.

Anthony Vincent Genovese (born 1932) is an American architect who practiced in the mid to late-twentieth-century New York and New Jersey as a partner in the architectural firm name Genovese & Maddalene. He is currently (as of 2023) practicing as the principal architect of Genovese Associates Inc.

== Personal life ==
Anthony Vincent Genovese was born on February 25, 1932, in Union City, New Jersey, he earned his Bachelor of Architecture from the University of Notre Dame in 1955 and earned his Master of Fine Arts in architecture from Princeton University in 1957.

== Career ==
In 1955, he was awarded the Church Property Administration Sculpture Award, the Sollitt Prize for Design & Construction Award, the Student AIA Medal, and the Fire Underwriters scholarship. He was a Buehler Fellow from 1955 to 1956. Genovese joined the New Jersey Society of Architects, American Institute of Architects, in 1964, and was registered to practice in New York and New Jersey.

With Herbert F. Maddalene, Anthony V. Genovese established the firm Genovese & Maddalene in 1963. The firm focused primarily on the design of churches in a Modernist style, and related work.

In 1982, Genovese was convicted along with state senator William Musto, organized crime figure Rudolph Orlandini, and others for participation in a bribery and kickbacks scheme related to school construction projects in Union, NJ and received a suspended sentence.

== Works with Genovese Associates ==
- 1995: Papal Visit, Pope John Paul II, Giants Stadium, NJ

== Works with Genovese & Maddalene ==
- 1965: Papal Visit, Pope Paul VI, Yankee Stadium, NY
- 1967: Church of the Holy Name of Jesus (Rochester, New York)
- 1968: Advent Lutheran Church (Wyckoff, New Jersey)
- 1969: Our Lady of Good Counsel Church (Staten Island, New York)
- 1969: Our Lady of Mt. Carmel Church (Staten Island, New York)
- 1969: Church of the Nativity (Manhattan)
