= Paramus, New Jersey =

Borough in Bergen County, New Jersey, US

- Borough
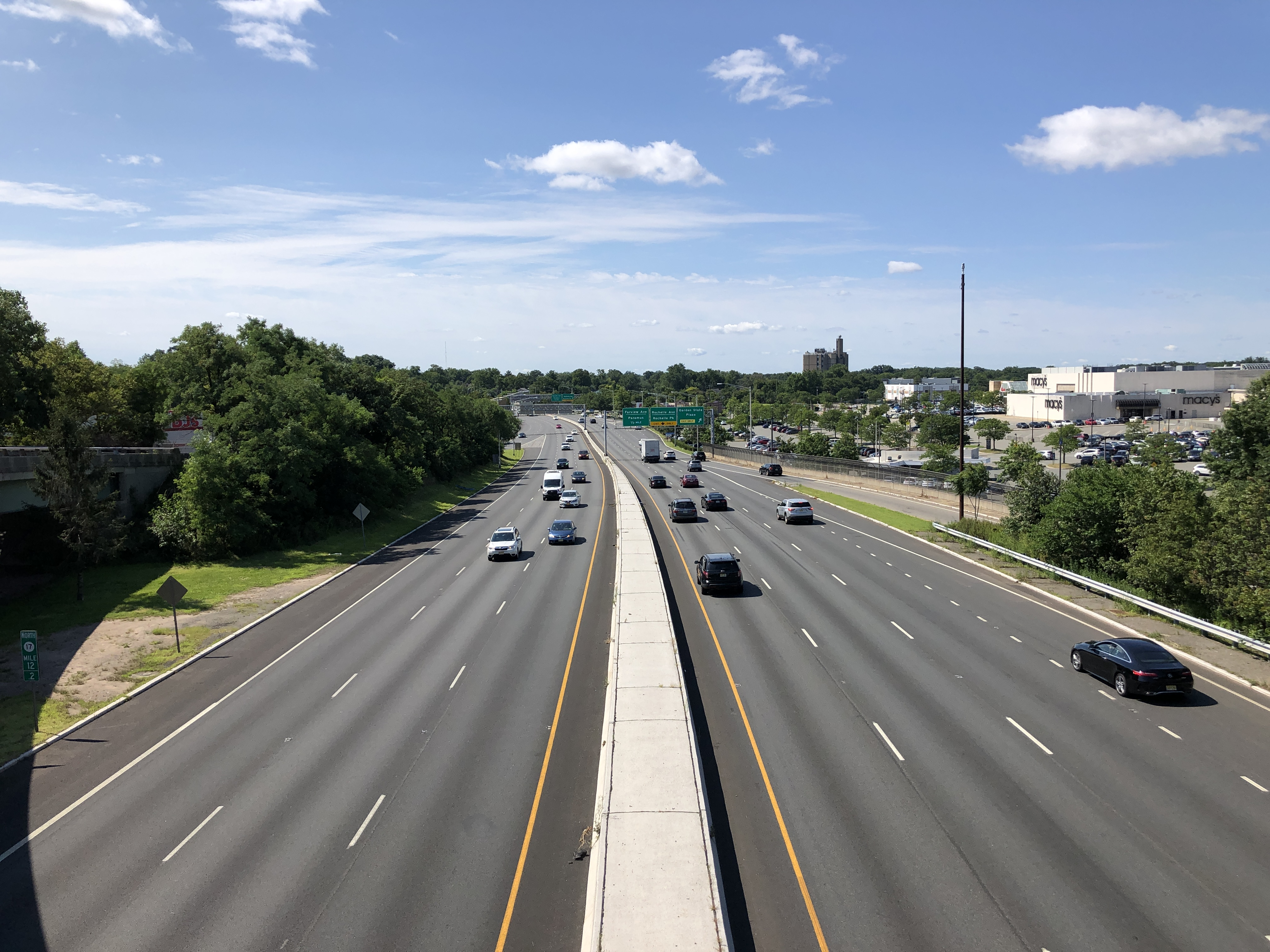
- Route 17 from the overpass ramp to Route 4; both are heavily trafficked corridors in Bergen County.

- Seal

- Location of Paramus in Bergen County highlighted in red (left). Inset map: Location of Bergen County in New Jersey highlighted in orange (right).
- Interactive map of Paramus, New Jersey
- Location in Bergen County Location in New Jersey Location in the United States
- Coordinates: 40.947299°N 74.070169°W
- Country: United States
- State: New Jersey
- County: Bergen
- Incorporated: April 4, 1922

Government
  - Type: Borough
  - Body: Borough Council
  - Mayor: Christopher DiPiazza (R, term ends December 31, 2026)
  - Administrator: Hector Olmo
  - Municipal clerk: Annemarie Krusznis

Area
  - Total: 10.51 sq mi (27.21 km^{2})
  - Land: 10.44 sq mi (27.05 km^{2})
  - Water: 0.062 sq mi (0.16 km^{2}) 0.60%
  - Rank: 206th of 565 in state 2nd of 70 in county
- Elevation: 49 ft (15 m)

Population (2020)
  - Total: 26,698
  - Estimate (2023): 26,282
  - Rank: 95th of 565 in state 8th of 70 in county
  - Density: 2,556.1/sq mi (986.9/km^{2})
  - Rank: 247th of 565 in state 49th of 70 in county
- Time zone: UTC−05:00 (Eastern (EST))
  - Summer (DST): UTC−04:00 (Eastern (EDT))
- ZIP Codes: 07652–07653
- Area codes: 201 and 551
- FIPS code: 3400355950
- GNIS feature ID: 0885340
- Website: www.paramusborough.gov

Paramus (English pronunciation: /pəˈɹæːməs/) is a borough in the central portion of Bergen County, in the U.S. state of New Jersey. A suburban bedroom community of New York City, Paramus is located 15 to 20 miles (24 to 32 km) northwest of Midtown Manhattan and approximately 8 miles (13 km) west of Upper Manhattan. The Wall Street Journal characterized Paramus as "quintessentially suburban". The borough is also a major commercial hub for North Jersey (home to Garden State Plaza and various corporate headquarters).

As of the 2020 United States census, the borough's population was 26,698, an increase of 356 (+1.4%) from the 2010 census count of 26,342, which in turn reflected an increase of 605 (+2.4%) from the 25,737 counted in the 2000 census.

Paramus was incorporated as a borough by an act of the New Jersey Legislature on March 2, 1922, and ratified by a referendum held on April 4, 1922, that passed by a vote of 238 to 10. Paramus was created from portions of Midland Township, which now exists as Rochelle Park. The borough's name is thought to have originated from the Unami language spoken by the Lenape Native Americans, derived from words meaning "land of the turkeys" or "pleasant stream".

Paramus has some of the most restrictive blue laws in the United States, dating back to the 17th century, banning nearly all white-collar and retail businesses from opening on Sundays except for gas stations, restaurants and grocery stores, and a limited number of other businesses. Despite this, the borough is one of the largest shopping destinations in the country, generating over $6 billion in annual retail sales, more than any other ZIP Code in the United States.

== History ==
=== Pre-settlement ===
The area that ultimately became the present-day North Jersey had been occupied for thousands of years by prehistoric indigenous peoples. At the time of European encounter, it was settled by the Lenape Native Americans. The Lenape language word for the area, Peremessing, which meant that it had an abundant population of wild turkey, was anglicized to become the word "Paramus". A large metal statue of a wild turkey in the Paramus Park mall commemorates this history. Another alternative derivation is that the word means "pleasant stream".

=== 18th century ===
Albrycht Zaborowski, whose descendants became known by the family name "Zabriskie", immigrated from Poland via the Dutch ship Deb Ves in 1662. He settled in the Dutch West Indies Company town of Ackensack, site of the present-day Hackensack. A son, Jacob, was captured by the Lenape and held for 15 years. When he was returned to his family, the Lenape explained to Saboroweski that they had taken the child in order to teach him their language so that he could serve as a translator. They granted Saboroweski approximately 2,000 acres (8.1 km^{2}) of land which became known as the "Paramus Patent".

During the American Revolutionary War, the county included both Loyalists and Patriots, with Patriots "greatly outnumbering" Tories. Although no major battles were fought in Bergen County, Paramus was part of the military activity, as colonial troops were stationed in Ramapo under the command of Aaron Burr. In 1777, the British raided the Hackensack area and Burr marched troops to Paramus, where he attacked the British, forcing them to withdraw. General George Washington was in Paramus several times during the War: December 1778; July 1780; and, December 1780. Following the Battle of Monmouth, Washington established his headquarters in Paramus in July 1778. Over the advice of his staff, Washington moved his headquarters to Westchester County, New York.

A section of Paramus known as Dunkerhook, meaning dark corner in Dutch, was a free African-American community dating to the early 18th century. Although historical markers on the current site and local oral tradition maintain that this was a slave community, contemporary records document that it was a community of free blacks, not slaves. A group of houses built on Dunkerhook Road by the Zabriskies in the late 18th to early 19th centuries was the center of a community of black farmers, who had been slaves held by the Zabriskie family.

=== 20th century ===
In 1909, the Arcola Country Club and golf course was created in 1909 and the neighborhood by that name grew around it. Farview Avenue, located at the highest elevation in Paramus, has a clear view of the Manhattan skyline.

Paramus became one of the truck farming areas that helped New Jersey earn its nickname as the "Garden State". By 1940, Paramus' population was just 4,000, with no town center and 94 retail establishments. Although the opening of the George Washington Bridge in 1931 and the widening of Route 17 and Route 4, which intersect in southern Paramus, made the area accessible to millions, "it was not until the 1950s that massive development hit this section of northern New Jersey".

During the 1950s and 1960s, Paramus, lacking any master plan until 1969, was redeveloped into two shopping corridors when its farmers and outside developers saw that shopping malls were more lucrative than produce farming. "It was a developer's dream: flat cleared land adjacent to major arterials and accessible to a growing suburban population and the country's largest city – with no planning restrictions". New York had a state sales tax, but New Jersey had no sales tax on clothing and food, so with the opening of Manhattan department stores in the Bergen Mall (1957), the Garden State Plaza (1957) and Alexander's (1961), Paramus became the "first stop outside New York City for shopping".

From 1948 to 1958, the population of Paramus nearly quadrupled, from 6,000 to 23,000, while the number of retail establishments tripled from 111 to 319, and annual retail sales increased twenty-fold in nominal dollars, from $5.5 million (equivalent to $73.7 million in 2025) to $112 million (equal to $1.2 billion in 2025). By the 1980s, when the population had increased slightly over 1960s levels, retail sales had climbed to $1 billion.

=== 21st century ===
Paramus was the scene of one of the worst COVID-19 outbreaks in the U.S. when an outbreak at the New Jersey Veterans Home resulted in 74 deaths, all former soldiers through May 2020, with some 60% of the home's 314 residents being infected.

== Geography ==
According to the United States Census Bureau, the borough had a total area of 10.51 square miles (27.21 km^{2}), including 10.45 square miles (27.05 km^{2}) of land and 0.06 square miles (0.16 km^{2}) of water (0.60%).

The borough borders the Bergen County municipalities of Emerson, Fair Lawn, Glen Rock, Hackensack, Maywood, Oradell, Ridgewood, River Edge, Rochelle Park, Saddle Brook and Washington Township.

Named neighborhoods within the borough include Arcola, Bergen Place, Dunkerhook, Fairway Oaks, and Spring Valley.

== Demographics ==
Historical population
Census	Pop.	Note	%±
1900	889		—
1910	779		−12.4%
1920	1,321		69.6%
1930	2,649		100.5%
1940	3,688		39.2%
1950	6,268		70.0%
1960	23,238		270.7%
1970	28,381		22.1%
1980	26,474		−6.7%
1990	25,067		−5.3%
2000	25,737		2.7%
2010	26,342		2.4%
2020	26,698		1.4%
2023 (est.)	26,282	▼	−1.6%
Population sources: 1930 1900–1900–2020; 2000 2010 2020

=== Racial and ethnic composition ===
Paramus borough, New Jersey – Racial and ethnic composition Note: the US Census treats Hispanic/Latino as an ethnic category. This table excludes Latinos from the racial categories and assigns them to a separate category. Hispanics/Latinos may be of any race.
Race / Ethnicity (NH = Non-Hispanic)	Pop 2000	Pop 2010	Pop 2020	% 2000	% 2010	% 2020
White alone (NH)	19,433	17,626	15,556	75.51%	66.91%	58.27%
Black or African American alone (NH)	278	335	459	1.08%	1.27%	1.72%
Native American or Alaska Native alone (NH)	10	11	3	0.04%	0.04%	0.01%
Asian alone (NH)	4,419	5,850	6,966	17.17%	22.21%	26.09%
Native Hawaiian or Pacific Islander alone (NH)	1	13	0	0.00%	0.05%	0.00%
Other race alone (NH)	18	57	135	0.07%	0.22%	0.51%
Mixed race or Multiracial (NH)	325	537	769	1.26%	2.04%	2.88%
Hispanic or Latino (any race)	1,253	1,913	2,810	4.87%	7.26%	10.53%
Total	25,737	26,342	26,698	100.00%	100.00%	100.00%

=== 2020 census ===
As of the 2020 census, Paramus had a population of 26,698. The median age was 47.9 years. 19.1% of residents were under the age of 18 and 24.2% of residents were 65 years of age or older. For every 100 females there were 93.9 males, and for every 100 females age 18 and over there were 90.5 males age 18 and over.

100.0% of residents lived in urban areas, while 0.0% lived in rural areas.

There were 8,448 households in Paramus, of which 33.6% had children under the age of 18 living in them. Of all households, 68.5% were married-couple households, 10.0% were households with a male householder and no spouse or partner present, and 19.2% were households with a female householder and no spouse or partner present. About 15.7% of all households were made up of individuals and 11.0% had someone living alone who was 65 years of age or older.

There were 8,786 housing units, of which 3.8% were vacant. The homeowner vacancy rate was 1.2% and the rental vacancy rate was 4.6%.

=== 2010 census ===
The 2010 United States census counted 26,342 people, 8,630 households, and 6,939 families in the borough. The population density was 2,516.0 per square mile (971.4/km^{2}). There were 8,915 housing units at an average density of 851.5 per square mile (328.8/km^{2}). The racial makeup was 72.29% (19,042) White, 1.42% (374) Black or African American, 0.11% (28) Native American, 22.28% (5,869) Asian, 0.05% (13) Pacific Islander, 1.39% (366) from other races, and 2.47% (650) from two or more races. Hispanic or Latino residents of any race were 7.26% (1,913) of the population. 6.9% of residents self-identified as being Korean American, which makes it the largest ethnic minority group in the borough.

Of the 8,630 households, 33.8% had children under the age of 18; 68.4% were married couples living together; 9.1% had a female householder with no husband present and 19.6% were non-families. Of all households, 17.8% were made up of individuals and 13.3% had someone living alone who was 65 years of age or older. The average household size was 2.92 and the average family size was 3.32.

21.5% of the population were under the age of 18, 7.1% from 18 to 24, 19.2% from 25 to 44, 30.2% from 45 to 64, and 21.9% who were 65 years of age or older. The median age was 46.3 years. For every 100 females, the population had 94.9 males. For every 100 females ages 18 and older there were 91.7 males.

The Census Bureau's 2006–2010 American Community Survey showed that (in 2010 inflation-adjusted dollars) median household income was $104,986 (with a margin of error of +/− $9,111) and the median family income was $123,848 (+/− $7,952). Males had a median income of $77,325 (+/− $5,222) versus $52,702 (+/− $4,983) for females. The per capita income for the borough was $40,024. About 1.6% of families and 2.8% of the population were below the poverty line, including 3.0% of those under age 18 and 4.1% of those age 65 or over.

Same-sex couples headed 35 households in 2010, more than double the 17 counted in the 2000 census.

=== 2000 census ===
As of the 2000 United States census there were 25,737 people, 8,082 households, and 6,780 families residing in the borough. The population density was 2,457.7 inhabitants per square mile (948.9/km^{2}). There were 8,209 housing units at an average density of 783.9 per square mile (302.7/km^{2}). The racial makeup of the borough was 79.19% White, 1.13% African American, 0.05% Native American, 17.23% Asian, 0.01% Pacific Islander, 0.89% from other races, and 1.51% from two or more races. Hispanic or Latino residents of any race were 4.87% of the population.

There were 8,082 households, out of which 37.0% had children under the age of 18 living with them, 73.3% were married couples living together, 8.0% had a female householder with no husband present, and 16.1% were non-families. 14.4% of all households were made up of individuals, and 9.4% had someone living alone who was 65 years of age or older. The average household size was 3.00 and the average family size was 3.32.

In the borough 23.2% of the population was under the age of 18, 5.5% was from 18 to 24, 24.7% from 25 to 44, 25.0% from 45 to 64, and 21.5% was 65 years of age or older. The median age was 43 years. For every 100 females, there were 94.4 males. For every 100 females age 18 and over, there were 90.4 males.

The median income for a household in the borough was $76,918, and the median income for a family was $84,406. Males had a median income of $56,635 versus $37,450 for females. The per capita income for the borough was $29,295. About 1.4% of families and 3.3% of the population were below the poverty line, including 3.4% of those under age 18 and 5.0% of those age 65 or over.

== Economy ==
=== Corporate headquarters ===
Paramus was home to the America regional headquarters of Hanjin Shipping, located on the eastbound side of Route 4 before it declared bankruptcy in 2017. Hudson City Bancorp had its headquarters located at West 80 Century Road until its acquisition by M&T Bank, which was completed in 2015. Movado Group Inc. is a watchmaker with its headquarters on From Road. Suez North America, founded as Hackensack Water Company in 1869 and later named United Water, is an American water service company headquartered in Paramus. Coach USA is a large tour operator with its headquarters in Paramus, at the offices of its Community Coach subsidiary. Kristian Regale is a non-alcoholic beverage company based in Paramus.

Paramus was the former headquarters location for Toys "R" Us before the company relocated to Wayne in 2002 and went bankrupt. Paramus was also the headquarters of Magic Solutions, a defunct computer software company that specialized in help desk automation and asset management software.

=== Malls ===
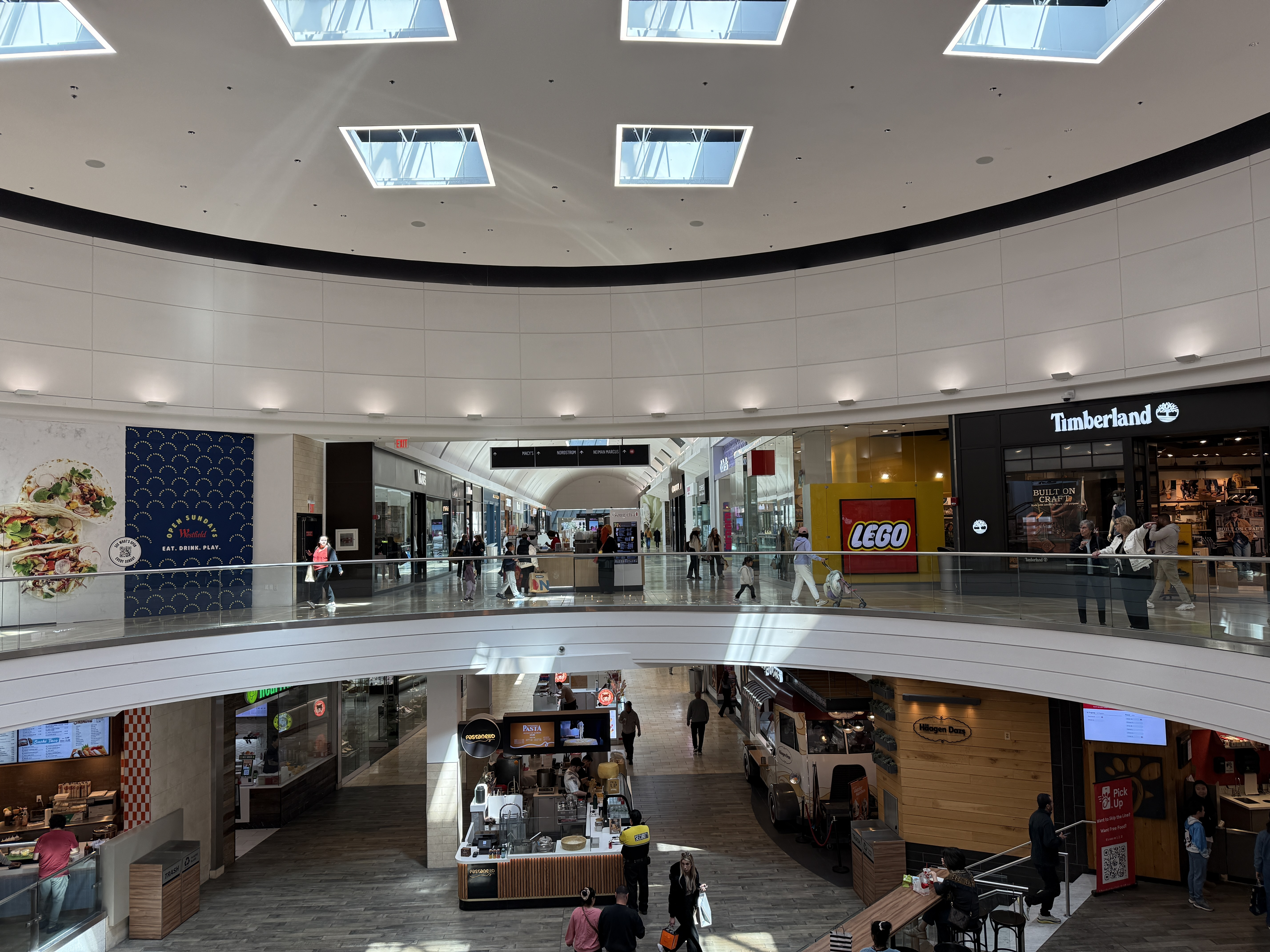
Garden State Plaza

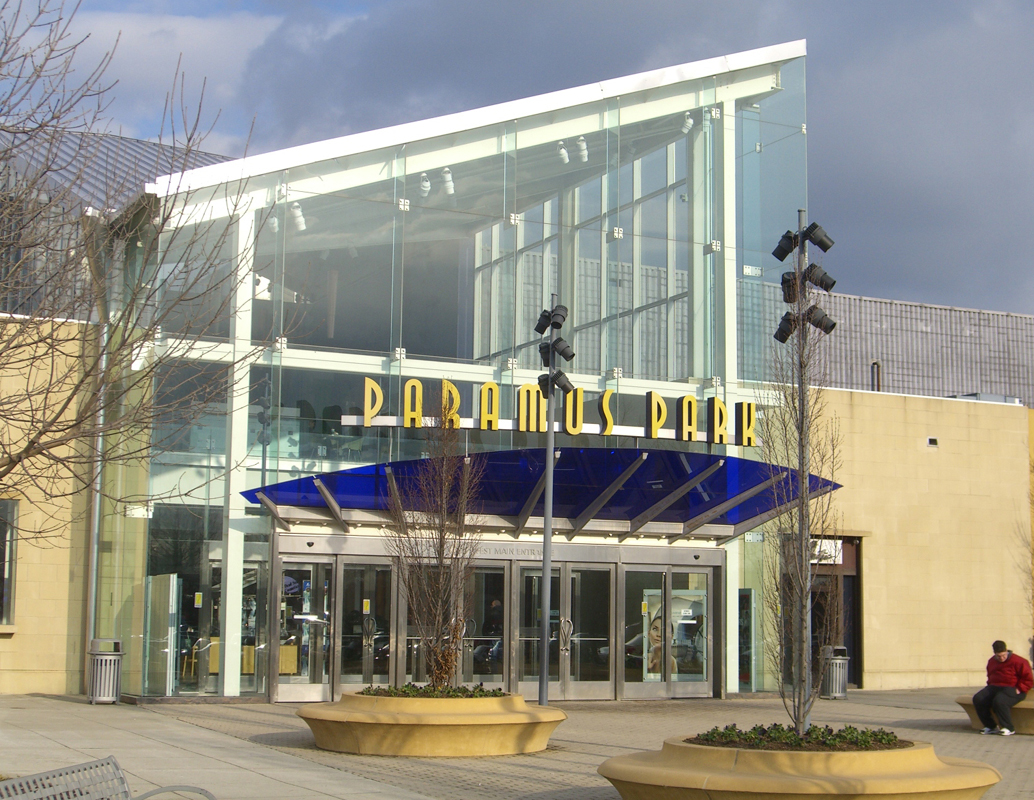
Paramus Park

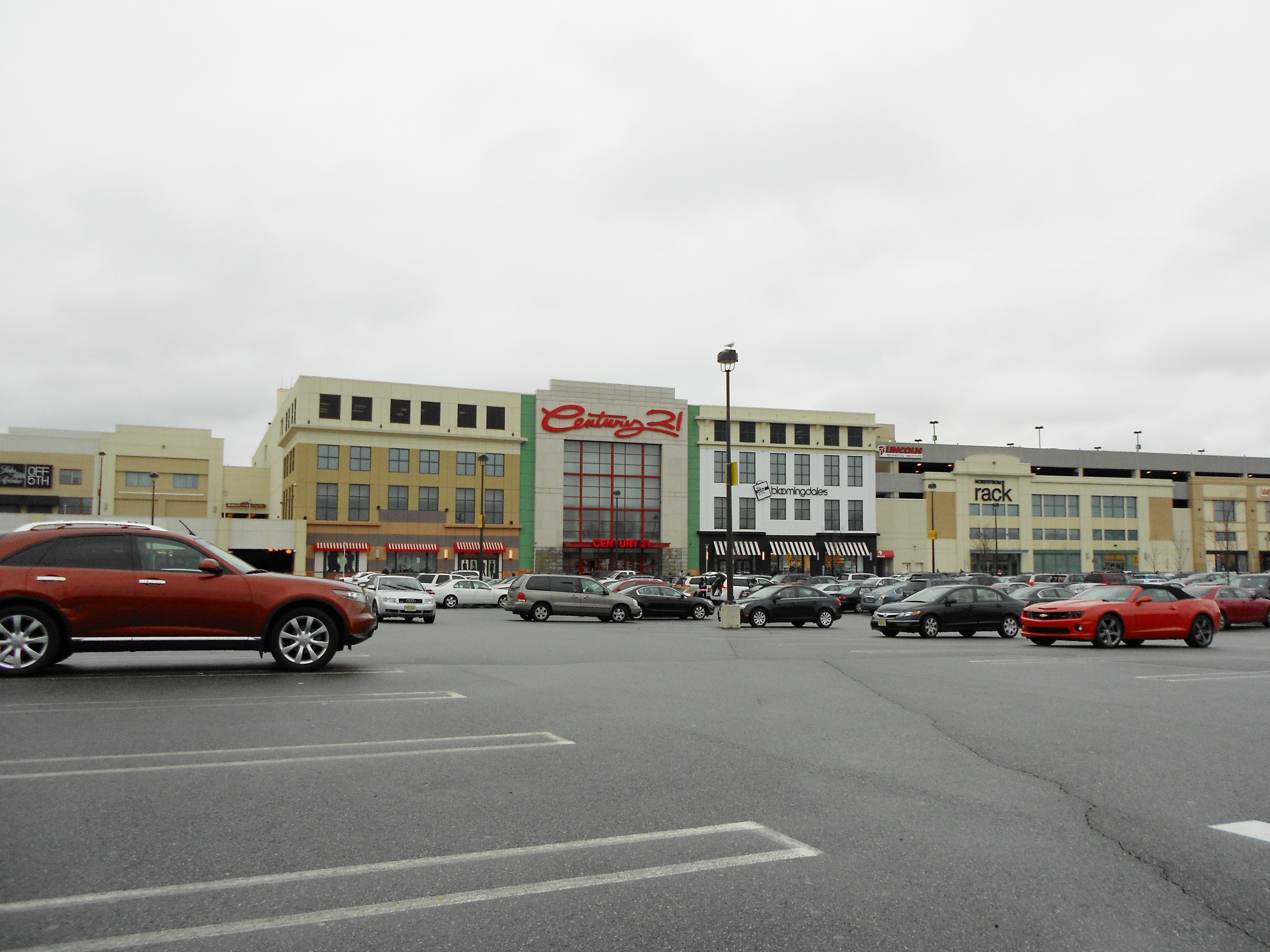
Bergen Town Center

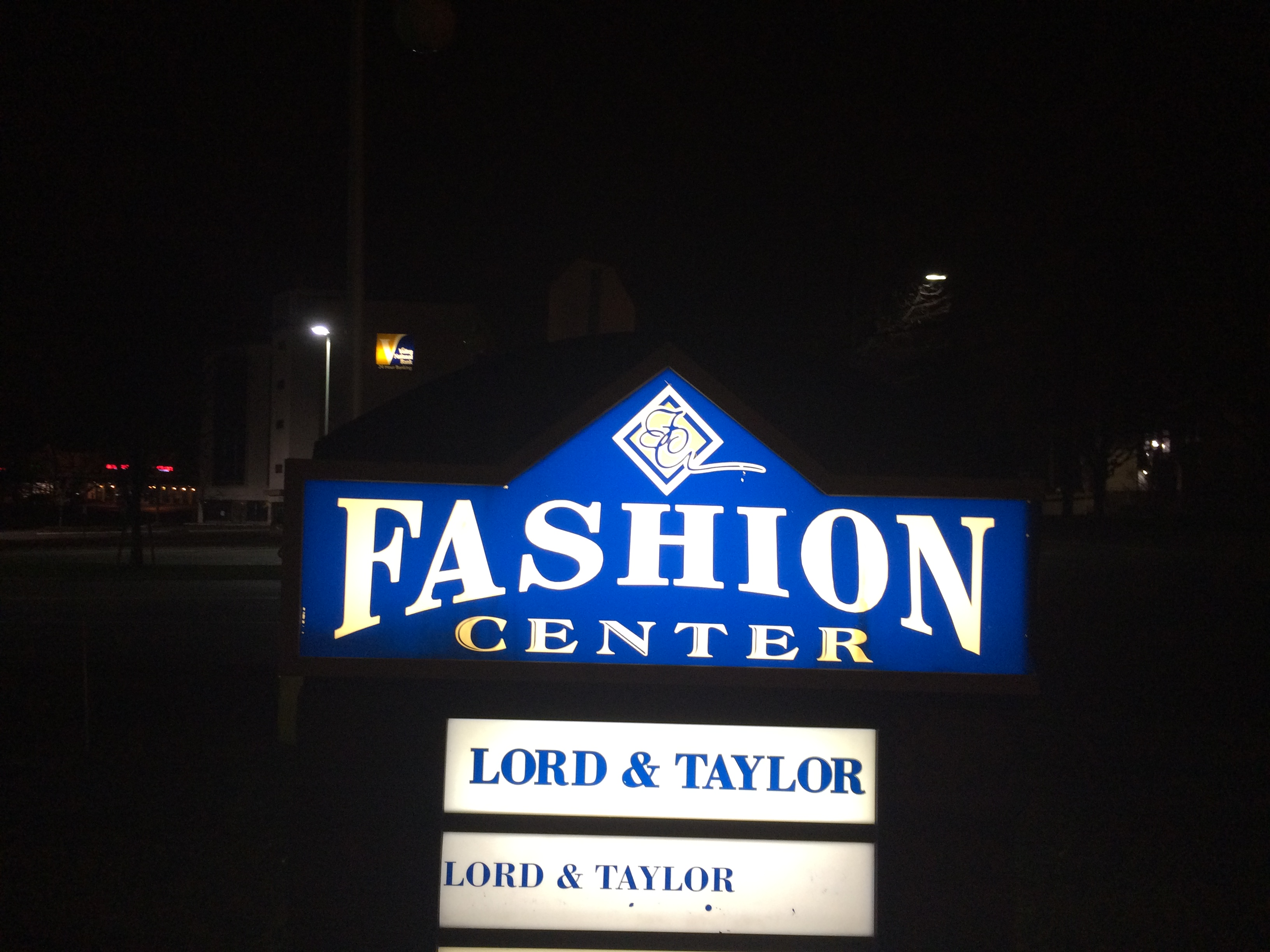
Fashion Center

Paramus is known for its multitude of stores and malls. It has five major indoor shopping centers, serving residents in the areas of Bergen County and Passaic County in New Jersey and Rockland County in New York. New Jersey does not levy a sales tax on clothes and shoes, which makes it an attractive shopping destination for people even further away in New York City, who pay sales tax on clothing items above $110 in price, in addition to the lower standard rate of 6.625% in New Jersey, compared to 8.875% in New York City. The borough is one of the largest shopping destinations in the country, generating over $6 billion in annual retail sales, more than any other ZIP Code in the United States despite the county's blue laws. At the intersection of Routes 4 and 17 is Garden State Plaza, the largest and best-known mall in the borough. Westfield Garden State Plaza is the largest mall in the Westfield Group's global portfolio and the largest in New Jersey, with a gross leasable area of 2,128,402 square feet (200,000 m^{2}). On Route 4, are Bergen Town Center (known as the Bergen Mall until 2006), Paramus Place and The Shoppes on IV. On Route 17, are Paramus Park, Paramus Towne Square, Paramus Design Center, and the Fashion Center.

Many national chain stores have at least one location in Paramus. Nordstrom's Paramus location was its first New York–area store when it opened in September 1990, with strong sales volume. There are 25 retailers that occupy multiple stores in Paramus, including Macy's, which had outlets in three malls for a period of time. Some retail analysts view Paramus as being two distinct markets, centered on the two major highways. Lord & Taylor had locations at both Westfield Garden State Plaza and Fashion Center, giving Paramus the distinction of being the only town with more than one Lord & Taylor location. However, by 2021, both locations closed, due to the company's bankruptcy from the COVID-19 pandemic. Toys "R" Us had two locations: at the Fashion Center, and at a location on the eastbound side of Route 4 near Forest Avenue. Paramus also housed a Babies "R" Us on the northbound side of Route 17, but it closed in 2018. Later that year, the Fashion Center and Route 4 Toys "R" Us locations both closed due to the company's bankruptcy. In 1983, Paramus was the location of one of the first Kids "R" Us stores. When Toys "R" Us was revived in 2019 after emerging from bankruptcy, the first new Toys "R" Us store opened at Garden State Plaza on November 27, 2019. However, it closed again on January 26, 2021, as a result of financial losses caused by the COVID-19 pandemic.

==== Blue laws ====
In addition to the state blue laws that apply to all of Bergen County, Paramus has even stricter restrictions, preventing stores selling non-food items from opening at all on Sundays. These laws were enacted shortly after Garden State Plaza opened, out of fear that the mall would cause high levels of congestion in the borough. It is one of the last places in the United States to have such an extensive blue law. This law was called into question when a BJ's Wholesale Club opened at the junction between Routes 4/17. BJ's was allowed to open on Sundays, but is only allowed to sell food and basic necessities. The store has been structured to restrict access to items that cannot be purchased on Sunday.

Local blue laws in Paramus were first proposed in 1957, while the Bergen Mall and Garden State Plaza were both under construction. The legislation was motivated by fears that the two new malls would increase the already-severe highway congestion caused by local retail operations along the borough's highways.

The Paramus Borough Code forbids the performance of any "worldly employment" on Sunday, with exceptions for charity, and the sale of newspapers, medicinal drugs, meals, prepared food and cigarettes, among a limited numbers of exceptions. Even work performed inside one's own home is prohibited on Sundays. In spite of its six-day shopping week, Paramus consistently has the most retail sales of any ZIP Code in the United States.

More than 63% of Bergen County voters rejected a referendum on the ballot in 1993 that would have repealed the county's blue laws, though the Paramus restrictions would have remained in place. An unsuccessful 2010 proposal by Governor of New Jersey Chris Christie would have ended the state's blue laws, now only enforced in Bergen County, with the governor citing industry estimates that the $1.1 billion in added retail revenue on Sundays would generate an additional $65 million in sales taxes for the state.

In November 2012, Governor Chris Christie issued an executive order temporarily suspending the blue laws in both Bergen County and Paramus due to the effects of Hurricane Sandy, a decision that was upheld despite a court challenge by the Borough of Paramus. The blue law suspension was in effect on Sunday, November 11, but was back in effect the following Sunday.

=== Timeline of malls and shopping centers ===
- 1957 – Garden State Plaza was built by Muscarelli Construction Company on 198 acres (0.80 km^{2}) at the intersection of Routes 4 and 17.
- 1957 – The Bergen Mall was built on 101 acres (41 ha) on an area east of the Plaza on Route 4.
- 1963 – Paramus Place was built on the north side of Route 4 across from Bergen Mall.
- 1967 – The Fashion Center was built on a 33-acre (13 ha) site of old celery farms, aimed at quality-oriented shoppers by developer Associated Dry Goods, with a 135,000-square-foot (12,500 m^{2}) Lord & Taylor and a 176,000-square-foot (16,400 m^{2}) B. Altman as anchors and 25 other retailers sandwiched in between The owners originally referred to its location as being in Ridgewood/Paramus to appeal to the Ridgewood population.
- 1972 – The 35 Plaza Shopping Center is built on Route 4, just located 2 minutes away from Paramus Place.
- 1974 – Paramus Park was built by the Rouse Company, offering a gross leasable area of 755,000 square feet (70,100 m^{2}). The most recent of the large centers was built on 66 acres (270,000 m^{2}) in the middle of an area where the old farms were located.
- 1986 – The Shoppes on IV opened up and was built on 236 acres (96 ha) in the westbound area of Route 4.
- 1998 – The Paramus Towne Square opened up and was built on the north side of Route 17.
- 2003 – IKEA opens a 370,000-square-foot (34,000 m^{2}) store, its second-largest location in North America, at the intersection of Routes 4 and 17 on the site of the old Alexander's department store. It was joined the next year by three other retailers, Bed Bath and Beyond, Christmas Tree Shops, and Sports Authority to form a shopping center with a combined gross leasable area of 719,226 square feet (66,818.3 m^{2}). However, when Sports Authority went out of business in 2016, the store was closed. Bed Bath and Beyond and Christmas Tree Shops both followed suit when their businesses went defunct in 2023, leaving IKEA the only open business left until 2026 when RH Outlet moved into the former Sports Authority building.
- 2015 – The Paramus Design Center opens up on the northbound side of Route 17.
- 2018 – The Paramus Crossroads shopping center, located on the southbound side of Route 17, officially opened in summer 2018.

Due to the stricter version of the blue laws in Paramus, malls (and almost all retail establishments) in the borough are closed on Sunday except for restaurants and other exempted establishments. Stores may not open before 7:00 am or remain open after 11:00 pm.

== Arts and culture ==
One of the earliest drive-in theaters opened in Paramus, featuring what was said to be the world's largest and brightest screen, located behind what is now Westfield Garden State Plaza. The Paramus Drive-In closed in 1987 after the last movie presentation, a double-feature of "Crocodile" Dundee and The Untouchables.

Currently, Paramus' lone movie theater complex is a 16-screen AMC Theatres located in an area of new construction at Westfield Garden State Plaza. Prior to the opening of the AMC complex, a number of theatres were closed in the borough, including the Route 4 Tenplex and the Cineplex Odeon Route 17 Triplex, once located next to Westfield Garden State Plaza on Route 17. The Triplex and Tenplex theatres was opened on October 12, 1965, by Century Theatres and was closed on May 24, 2007, by Loews Cineplex Entertainment. On May 25, 2007, the new AMC Theatres opened at Westfield Garden State Plaza. The Paramus Picture Show, known as Cinema 35 until 1997, closed in December 2004 in the wake of declining attendance. A 12-screen Regal Cinemas was planned to open at Paramus Park as part of renovations that would have replaced the Sears store with a Stew Leonard's location. However, the plans were cancelled after Stew Leonard's took up more space than expected.

The Bergen Town Center had a performing arts theater called "Playhouse on the Mall". It had a seating capacity of 635 seats and was opened in 1960. From 1960 to 1970, author Robert Ludlum was the manager of the theater. The theater closed in 1982 due to rising costs and low attendance and was converted into retail space in 1986.

In 2016, the Garden State Plaza added a Bergen Performing Arts Center performance area for shows and performances located near Macy's, which took up the former space of the Venetian carousel. There was also a Bergen PAC ticket center located near the performance area. The Bergen PAC performance area, however, was short lived as it was replaced by a video game theater, then it became a lounge area in 2017.

The glam metal band, Trixter, formed in Paramus. The hardcore/punk rock band The Escape Engine formed in the borough from 2002 to 2006.

== Parks and recreation ==
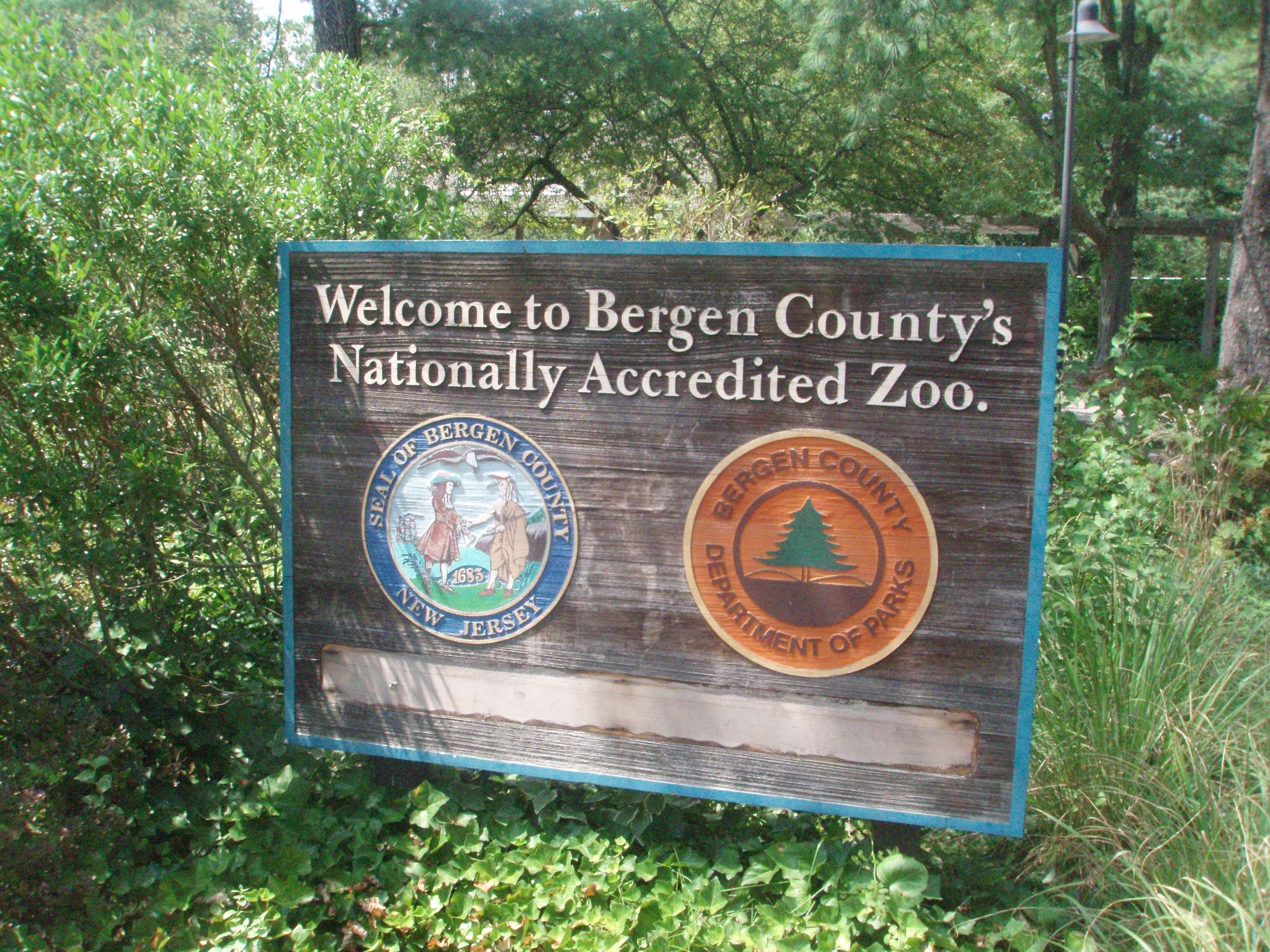
Bergen County Zoo at Van Saun County Park

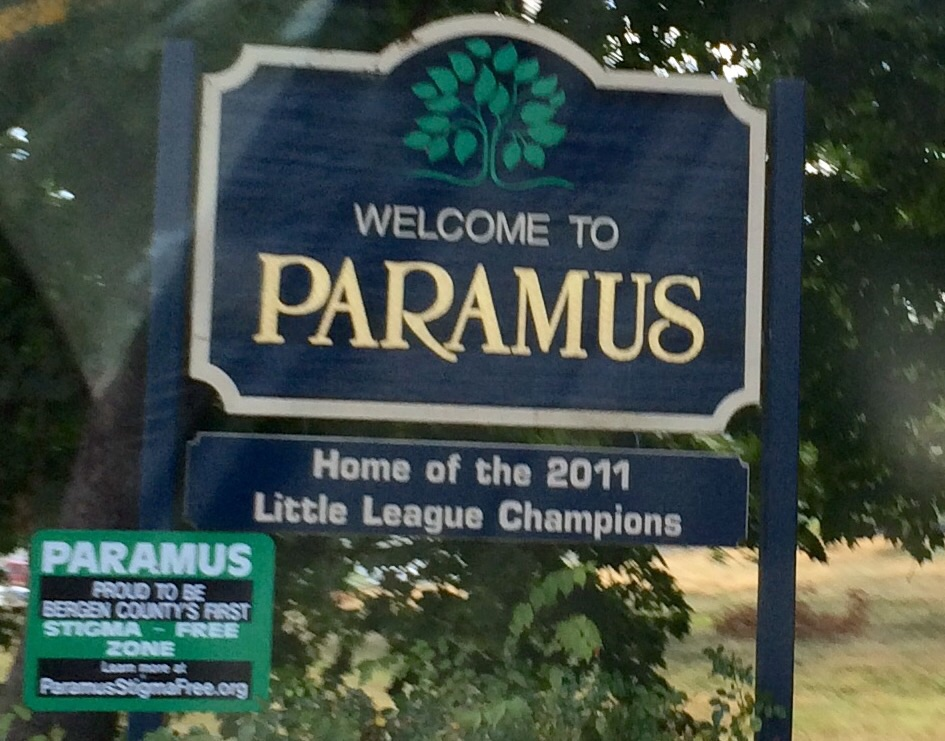
A welcome sign in Paramus, celebrating its status as a social stigma-free borough and home of the 2011 New Jersey State Little League Baseball Champions

Paramus is the home to two county parks. On the eastern side of the borough is Van Saun County Park, a 146-acre (59 ha) park that features Bergen County's only zoo, home to a wide variety of wild and domestic animals living in recreated habitats natural to each species. Van Saun Park also has a playground, train ride, carousel, athletic fields, and pony rides. The Washington Spring site in the park takes its name from reports that General Washington drank water from the spring here while his troops were encamped nearby, west of the Hackensack River. The Continental Army is reported to have utilized the old spring at the base of these slopes during the September encampment west of the Hackensack River.

On the western side of the borough is Saddle River County Park which features a 6-mile (9.7 km) bike path reaching from Ridgewood to Rochelle Park.

The borough has four golf courses. Two are open to the public, with the Paramus Golf Course operated by the borough and Orchard Hills County Golf Course operated by the county. The two private golf course located in Paramus are the Ridgewood Country Club and Arcola Country Club. Ridgewood Country Club was ranked as the #6 Center Ranked Among Top 500 Holes in the World Golf Magazine – 2000 and Ranked # 84 on the list of Most Prestigious Clubs in America Golf Connoisseur – 2006.

In 2008, the Paramus Golf Course opened a miniature golf course that is themed after the borough of Paramus as well as the state of New Jersey. Turkey statues are scattered around the course to celebrate Paramus as the "land of the wild turkeys".

Paramus has an outdoor municipal swimming pool complex on Van Binsberger Boulevard. It has three pools: a main pool, a pool for younger swimmers, and a baby pool. Paramus Little League were the 2011 New Jersey State Little League Baseball Champions.

Arcola Park was an outdoor amusement park built in 1926. It had a huge swimming pool, a convention hall, a dance pavilion, an auditorium, and rides. A fire in 1929 destroyed the entire park, with the exception of the pool. The pool was destroyed by another fire in 1970 and closed down for good. The park site was replaced by a Ramada Inn, the hotel extending into a small portion of Rochelle Park.

== Annual events ==
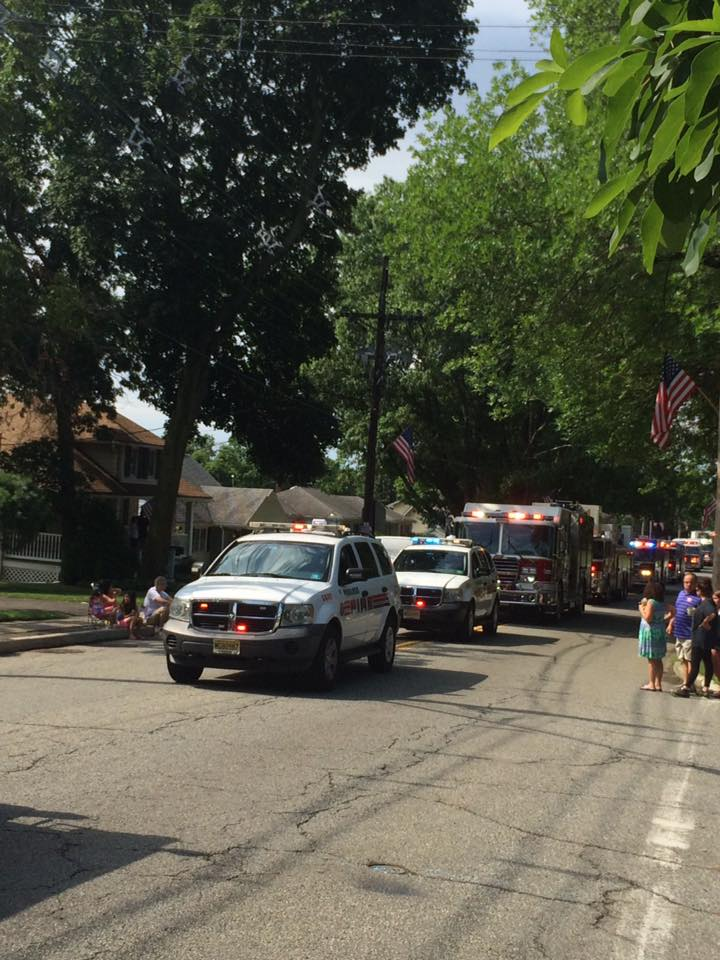
The Paramus Fire Department in the Paramus 4th of July parade, c. 2017

During the week of the 4th of July, Paramus holds its own Independence Day celebration. First, there is the performance of the Paramus Community Orchestra at the Paramus Bandshell which takes place on July 2. Next, on the 3rd, there is a softball game between the Paramus Fire Department and the Paramus Police Department, held annually since 2011. On the 4th, there is a parade. The parade route starts at the intersection of Century Road and Farview Avenue and ends at Memorial Elementary School. On the 5th, there is a fireworks display at the Cliff Gennarelli Paramus Sportsplex.

Paramus also holds its own Memorial Day parade every year.

Paramus hosts an annual National Night Out. The event typically includes games and activities as well as a concert. The borough's fire, rescue, police, and ambulance vehicles are also displayed.

The Paramus Rescue Squad and Fire Department Companies 2 & 3 host a Halloween party every October called, "Safe Halloween" to ensure every child has a safe and fun Halloween.

The Paramus Fire Department also has its annual "Santa Detail" every December. The fire department drives throughout the borough on the Sunday before Christmas with Santa riding atop the fire apparatus. Members of the department accompany Santa and give out lollipops to residents who come outside during the tour.

== Government ==
=== Local government ===
Paramus is governed under the borough form of New Jersey municipal government, which is used in 218 municipalities (of the 564) statewide, making it the most common form of government in New Jersey. The governing body is comprised of a mayor and a borough council, with all positions elected at-large on a partisan basis as part of the November general election. A mayor is elected directly by the voters to a four-year term of office. The borough council includes six members elected to serve three-year terms on a staggered basis, with two seats coming up for election each year in a three-year cycle. The borough form of government used by Paramus is a "weak mayor / strong council" government in which council members act as the legislative body with the mayor presiding at meetings and voting only in the event of a tie. The mayor can veto ordinances subject to an override by a two-thirds majority vote of the council. The mayor makes committee and liaison assignments for council members, and most appointments are made by the mayor with the advice and consent of the council.

As of 2024, the mayor is Republican Christopher DiPiazza, whose term of office ends December 31, 2026. Borough Council members are Ace A. Antonio (R, 2024), Robert Kaiser (R, 2024), Alfredo U. Nadera (R, 2026), Jorge E. Quintana (R, 2025), Mary Ellen Rizzo (R, 2026) and Jeanne T. Weber (R, 2025).

In February 2023, the borough council appointed Al Nadera to fill the seat expiring in December 2023 that became vacant when Chris DiPiazza took office as mayor.

In October 2015, Moody's Investors Service upgraded general obligation debt of the Borough of Paramus from Aa1 to Aaa, in light of the low levels of debt and the strength of the borough's financial operations, reserve levels, tax base, management practices and levels of wealth.

=== Federal, state and county representation ===
Paramus is located in the 5th Congressional District and is part of New Jersey's 38th state legislative district.

For the 119th United States Congress, New Jersey's 5th congressional district is represented by Josh Gottheimer (D, Wyckoff). New Jersey is represented in the United States Senate by Democrats Cory Booker (Newark, term ends 2027) and Andy Kim (Moorestown, term ends 2031).

For the 2026–2027 session, the 38th legislative district of the New Jersey Legislature is represented in the State Senate by Joseph Lagana (D, Paramus) and in the General Assembly by Lisa Swain (D, Fair Lawn) and Chris Tully (D, Bergenfield).

Bergen County is governed by a directly elected County Executive, with legislative functions performed by a Board of County Commissioners comprised of seven members who are elected at-large to three-year terms in partisan elections on a staggered basis, with either two or three seats coming up for election each November; a Chairman and Vice Chairman are selected from among its seven members at a reorganization meeting held every January. As of 2025, the county executive is James J. Tedesco III (D, Paramus), whose four-year term of office ends December 31, 2026.

Bergen County's Commissioners are Chair Mary J. Amoroso (D, Mahwah, 2025), Vice Chair Steven A. Tanelli (D, North Arlington, 2027), Chair Pro Tem Joan Voss (D, Fort Lee, 2026), Rafael Marte (D, Bergenfield, 2026), Germaine M. Ortiz (D, Emerson, 2025), Thomas J. Sullivan Jr. (D, Montvale, 2025) and Tracy Silna Zur (D, Franklin Lakes, 2027).

Bergen County's elected constitutional officials are Clerk John S. Hogan (D, Northvale, 2026), Sheriff Anthony Cureton (D, Englewood, 2027) and Surrogate Michael R. Dressler (D, Cresskill, 2026).

=== Politics ===
United States presidential election results for Paramus 2024 2020 2016 2012 2008 2004
Year	Republican		Democratic		Third party(ies)	
Year	No.	%	No.	%	No.	%
2024	8,213	56.26%	5,976	40.94%	409	2.80%
2020	8,034	50.04%	7,870	49.02%	152	0.95%
2016	6,565	49.70%	6,312	47.78%	333	2.52%
2012	6,123	50.46%	5,907	48.68%	105	0.87%
2008	6,885	51.47%	6,386	47.74%	106	0.79%
2004	6,868	52.60%	6,103	46.74%	87	0.67%

As of March 2011, there were a total of 16,874 registered voters in Paramus, of which 4,454 (26.4% vs. 31.7% countywide) were registered as Democrats, 3,474 (20.6% vs. 21.1%) were registered as Republicans and 8,938 (53.0% vs. 47.1%) were registered as Unaffiliated. There were 8 voters registered as Libertarians or Greens. Among the borough's 2010 Census population, 64.1% (vs. 57.1% in Bergen County) were registered to vote, including 81.6% of those ages 18 and over (vs. 73.7% countywide).

In the 2016 presidential election, Republican Donald Trump received 6,565 votes (49.5% vs. 41.1% countywide), ahead of Democrat Hillary Clinton with 6,312 votes (47.6% vs. 54.2%) and other candidates with 389 votes (2.9% vs. 4.6%), among the 13,434 ballots cast by the borough's 18,526 registered voters, for a turnout of 72.5% (vs. 72.5% in Bergen County). In the 2012 presidential election, Republican Mitt Romney received 6,123 votes here (50.0% vs. 43.5% countywide), ahead of Democrat Barack Obama with 5,907 votes (48.3% vs. 54.8%) and other candidates with 105 votes (0.9% vs. 0.9%), among the 12,234 ballots cast by the borough's 17,617 registered voters, for a turnout of 69.4% (vs. 70.4% in Bergen County). In the 2008 presidential election, Republican John McCain received 6,885 votes here (51.1% vs. 44.5% countywide), ahead of Democrat Barack Obama with 6,386 votes (47.4% vs. 53.9%) and other candidates with 106 votes (0.8% vs. 0.8%), among the 13,470 ballots cast by the borough's 17,747 registered voters, for a turnout of 75.9% (vs. 76.8% in Bergen County). In the 2004 presidential election, Republican George W. Bush received 6,868 votes here (52.3% vs. 47.2% countywide), ahead of Democrat John Kerry with 6,103 votes (46.5% vs. 51.7%) and other candidates with 87 votes (0.7% vs. 0.7%), among the 13,123 ballots cast by the borough's 17,206 registered voters, for a turnout of 76.3% (vs. 76.9% in the whole county).

Gubernatorial election results for Paramus
Year	Republican		Democratic		Third party(ies)	
Year	No.	%	No.	%	No.	%
2025	5,817	53.76%	4,965	45.89%	38	0.35%
2021	5,040	55.52%	3,997	44.03%	40	0.44%
2017	3,251	47.57%	3,464	50.69%	119	1.74%
2013	4,888	64.41%	2,641	34.80%	60	0.79%
2009	4,298	50.19%	3,857	45.04%	408	4.76%
2005	3,943	46.25%	4,421	51.86%	161	1.89%

In the 2013 gubernatorial election, Republican Chris Christie received 64.4% of the vote (4,888 cast), ahead of Democrat Barbara Buono with 34.8% (2,641 votes), and other candidates with 0.8% (60 votes), among the 7,809 ballots cast by the borough's 17,083 registered voters (220 ballots were spoiled), for a turnout of 45.7%. In the 2009 gubernatorial election, Republican Chris Christie received 4,298 votes here (49.7% vs. 45.8% countywide), ahead of Democrat Jon Corzine with 3,857 votes (44.6% vs. 48.0%), Independent Chris Daggett with 376 votes (4.3% vs. 4.7%) and other candidates with 32 votes (0.4% vs. 0.5%), among the 8,656 ballots cast by the borough's 17,354 registered voters, yielding a 49.9% turnout (vs. 50.0% in the county).

United States Senate election results for Paramus1
Year	Republican		Democratic		Third party(ies)	
Year	No.	%	No.	%	No.	%
2024	7,366	53.60%	6,013	43.75%	364	2.65%
2018	4,764	51.00%	4,377	46.85%	201	2.15%
2012	5,232	46.49%	5,852	52.00%	170	1.51%
2006	4,121	50.64%	3,931	48.30%	86	1.06%

United States Senate election results for Paramus2
Year	Republican		Democratic		Third party(ies)	
Year	No.	%	No.	%	No.	%
2020	7,656	48.74%	7,880	50.16%	173	1.10%
2014	3,341	44.82%	4,012	53.82%	102	1.37%
2013	2,226	50.17%	2,176	49.04%	35	0.79%
2008	5,794	47.74%	6,186	50.97%	157	1.29%

== Education ==
The Paramus Public Schools serve students in pre-kindergarten through twelfth grade.As of the 2023–24 school year, the district, comprised of eight schools, had an enrollment of 3,594 students and 335.7 classroom teachers (on an FTE basis), for a student–teacher ratio of 10.7:1. Schools in the district, with 2023–24 enrollment data from the National Center for Education Statistics, are Memorial Elementary School with 295 students in grades PreK–4, Midland Elementary School with 193 students in grades K–4, Parkway Elementary School with 294 students in grades PreK–4, Ridge Ranch Elementary School with 343 students in grades K–4, Stony Lane Elementary School with 201 students in grades K–4, East Brook Middle School with 592 students in grades 5–8, West Brook Middle School with 517 students in grades 5–8 and Paramus High School with 1,125 students in grades 9–12.

Three of the district's schools have been formally recognized with the National Blue Ribbon School Award of Excellence: Paramus High School in 1988–1989, Parkway Elementary School in 1987–1988 and Ridge Ranch Elementary School in 1998–1999.

Public school students from the borough, and all of Bergen County, are eligible to attend the secondary education programs offered by the Bergen County Technical Schools, which include the Bergen County Academies in Hackensack, and the Bergen Tech campus in Teterboro or Bergen Tech campus in Paramus. The district offers programs on a shared-time or full-time basis, with admission based on a selective application process and tuition covered by the student's home school district.

Paramus is home to many private religious schools. Paramus Catholic High School is a co-educational Roman Catholic high school founded in 1965 and operated by the Archdiocese of Newark. With more than 1,500 students, it has the largest enrollment of any Roman Catholic high school in the state of New Jersey. It is also the location of Visitation Academy, a Pre-K3–8 Catholic school also overseen by the Newark Archdiocese.

K–8 co-ed Jewish day schools in Paramus include Yavneh Academy; Yeshivat Noam, founded in 2001; and Ben Porat Yosef, which was established in 2001 and relocated to Paramus in 2008. Frisch School is a Modern Orthodox Jewish yeshiva serving grades 9–12 that describes itself as the nation's second-largest coed yeshiva high school.

Bergen Community College is based in Paramus, with other satellite centers located around the county. The bulk of the college's 17,000 students working towards degrees are located at the main campus in Paramus. The Bergen campus of Berkeley College is located in Paramus. There is also a DeVry University campus located at the 35 Plaza Shopping Center in Paramus. There is a Lincoln Tech campus at Bergen Town Center.

Paramus is home to five special education schools. New Alliance Academy, located on Midland Ave, provides educational and ancillary therapeutic services for high school teenagers experiencing acute psychological distress. Bleshman Regional Day School, located on East Ridgewood Avenue, serves students ages three through twenty-one years of age with multiple disabilities. The EPIC School (Educational Partnership for Instructing Children) is located on North Farview Avenue, next to the Our Lady of Visitation Church. The Alpine Learning Group is located on County Route 62, close to Linwood Avenue, and P.R.I.D.E. School, which is a part of the ECLC school, which serves three other locations in New Jersey, has a location on Sette Drive. The Bergen County Special Services School District, which provides public special education services on a countywide basis, is headquartered in Paramus.

=== Public library ===
The borough's public library maintains two locations—the Main Library on Century Road and the Charles E. Reid Branch library on Midland Avenue, which was originally a four-room schoolhouse built in 1876.

The borough's original public library, known locally as the Howland House, was originally located at the intersection of Spring Valley Road and Howland Avenue. It was demolished sometime in the late 1990s. A September 11, 2001 memorial park now exists at the site known as Howland Memorial Grove.

== Healthcare ==
- Atlantic Health System Paramus Pavilion – located at Paramus Park in the former Sears Auto Center. This facility offers services such as physical therapy and rehabilitation services.
- New Bridge Medical Center – located at 230 East Ridgewood Avenue, this medical center is a 1,070-bed hospital that is a clinical affiliate of Rutgers Health. It was founded in 1916 and is the largest hospital and licensed nursing home in the entire state of New Jersey.
- Oradell Animal Hospital – located on Winters Avenue, across from Paramus Park, this facility provides medical care and treatments for all animals.
- Paramus has a St. Joseph's Regional Medical Center campus located on Century Road.
- The Valley Hospital has a health and fitness center on the southbound side of Route 17 and is specialized in recovery physical therapy. Valley Hospital also has support offices at the Kraft Center, located on 15 Essex Avenue. In addition, the Luckow Pavilion, located at 1 Valley Health Plaza, near the Fashion Center, specializes in cancer treatment, fertility, gamma knife surgery, and pharmacy.
- The Valley Hospital's main campus is located on 4 Valley Health Plaza and houses the hospital's inpatient medical/surgical services and emergency department, as well as cardiovascular, orthopedic, oncology, mother/baby and neurology services.

== Transportation ==
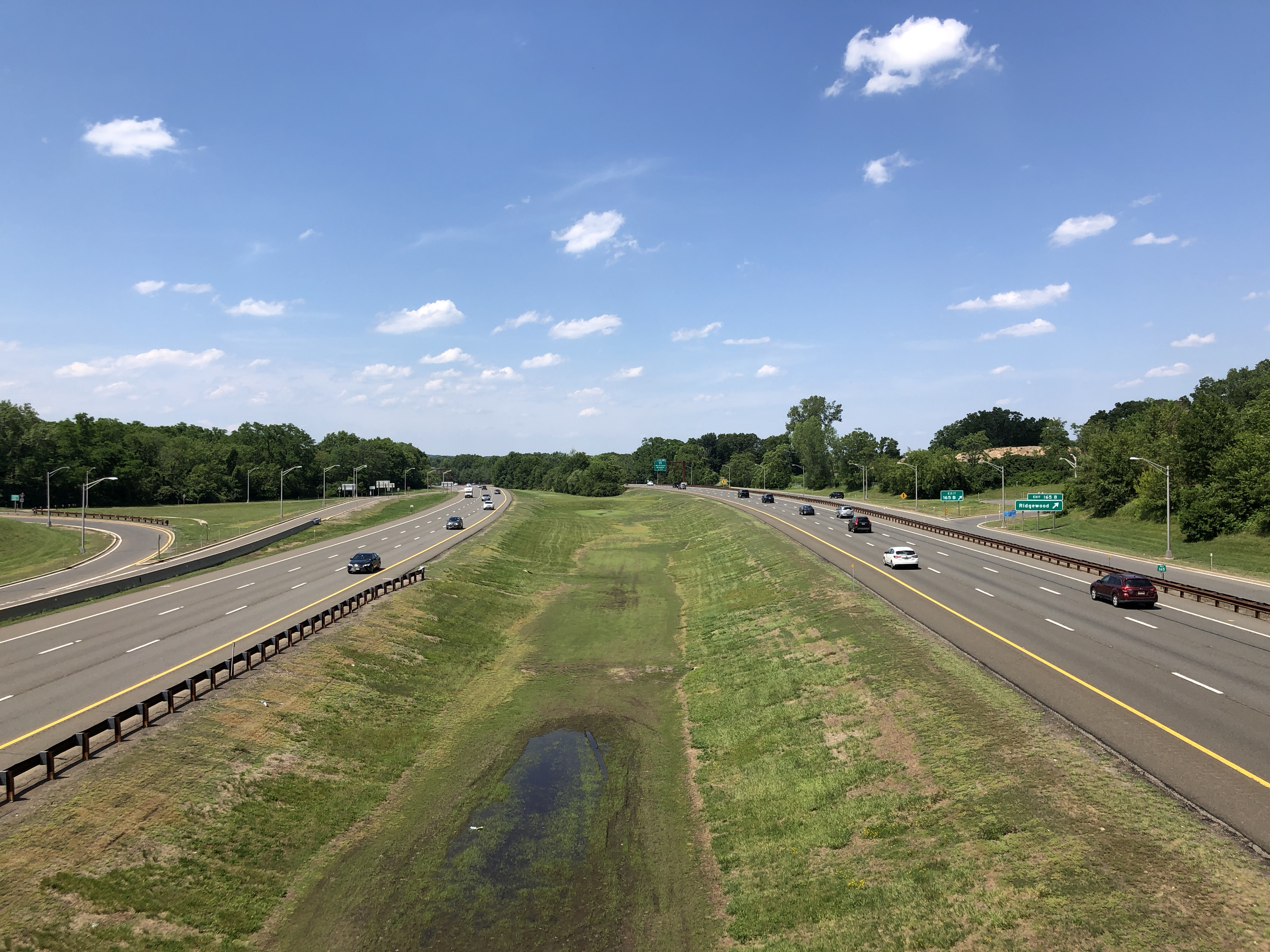
The Garden State Parkway in Paramus

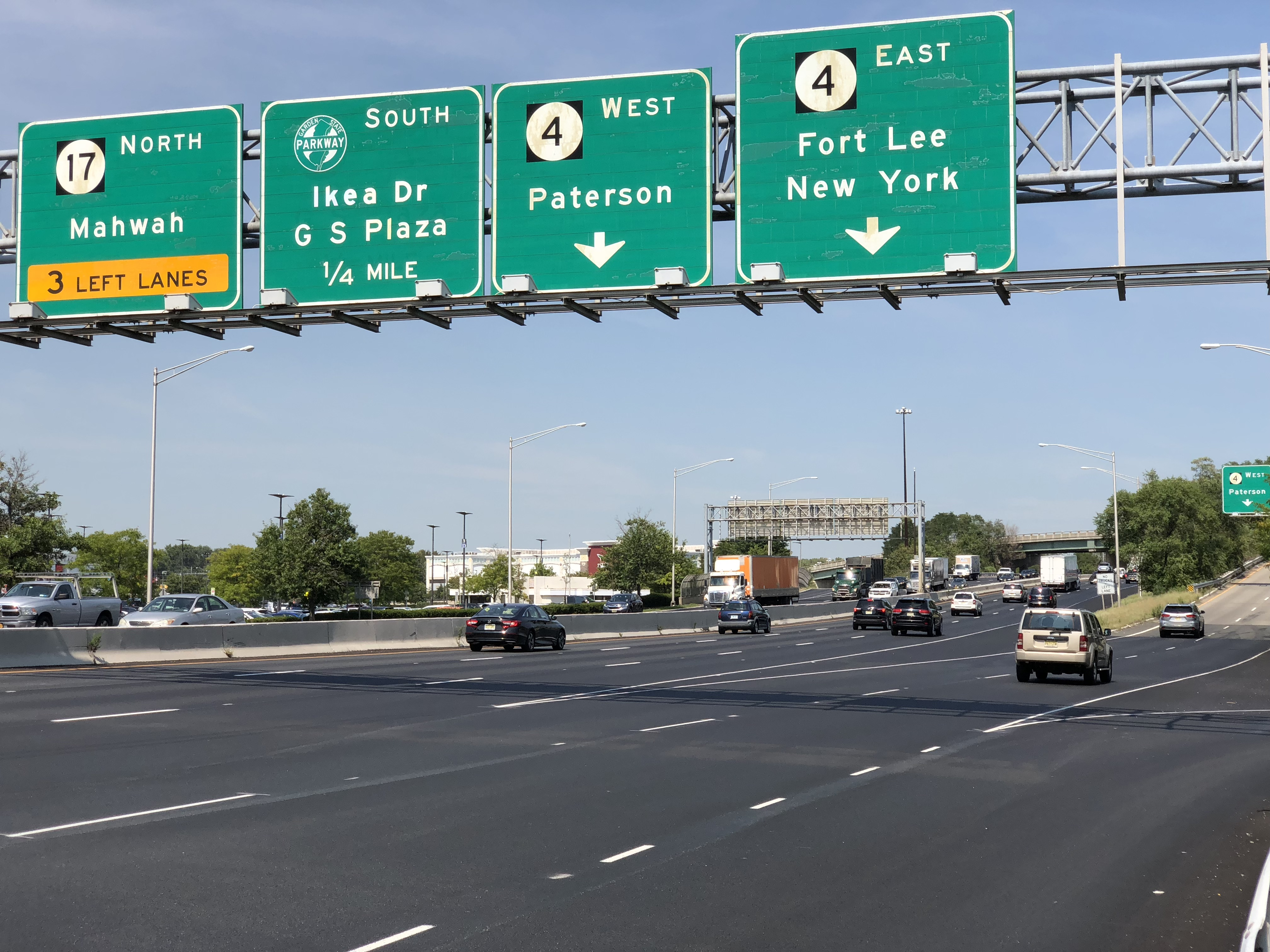
The intersection of Route 17 and Route 4 in the commercial hub of Bergen County

=== Roads and highways ===
As of July 2015, the borough had a total of 121.92 miles (196.21 km) of roadways, of which 90.93 miles (146.34 km) were maintained by the municipality, 18.86 miles (30.35 km) by Bergen County, 7.72 miles (12.42 km) by the New Jersey Department of Transportation, and 4.41 miles (7.10 km) by the New Jersey Turnpike Authority.

Highways in Paramus include Route 17, Route 4 and the Garden State Parkway (including the Paramus Toll Plaza at Interchange 165).

=== Public transportation ===
NJ Transit bus routes 144, 145, 148, 155, 157, 162, 163, 164, 165 and 168 serve the Port Authority Bus Terminal in Midtown Manhattan; the 171 and 175 routes provide service to the George Washington Bridge Bus Station; and local service is offered on the 709, 722, 751, 752, 753, 755, 756, 758, 762 and 770 routes. Nine of the 22 NJ Transit buses that serve Paramus do not provide service on Sundays. The 722 does not provide services on Saturdays and Sundays.

Coach USA provides bus service to the Port Authority Bus Terminal via Rockland Coaches route 45 from Pomona, New York, and via Short Line on Route 17.

Spanish Transportation and several other operators provide frequent jitney service along Route 4 between Paterson, New Jersey, and the George Washington Bridge Bus Station.

== Points of interest ==
=== Historic sites ===
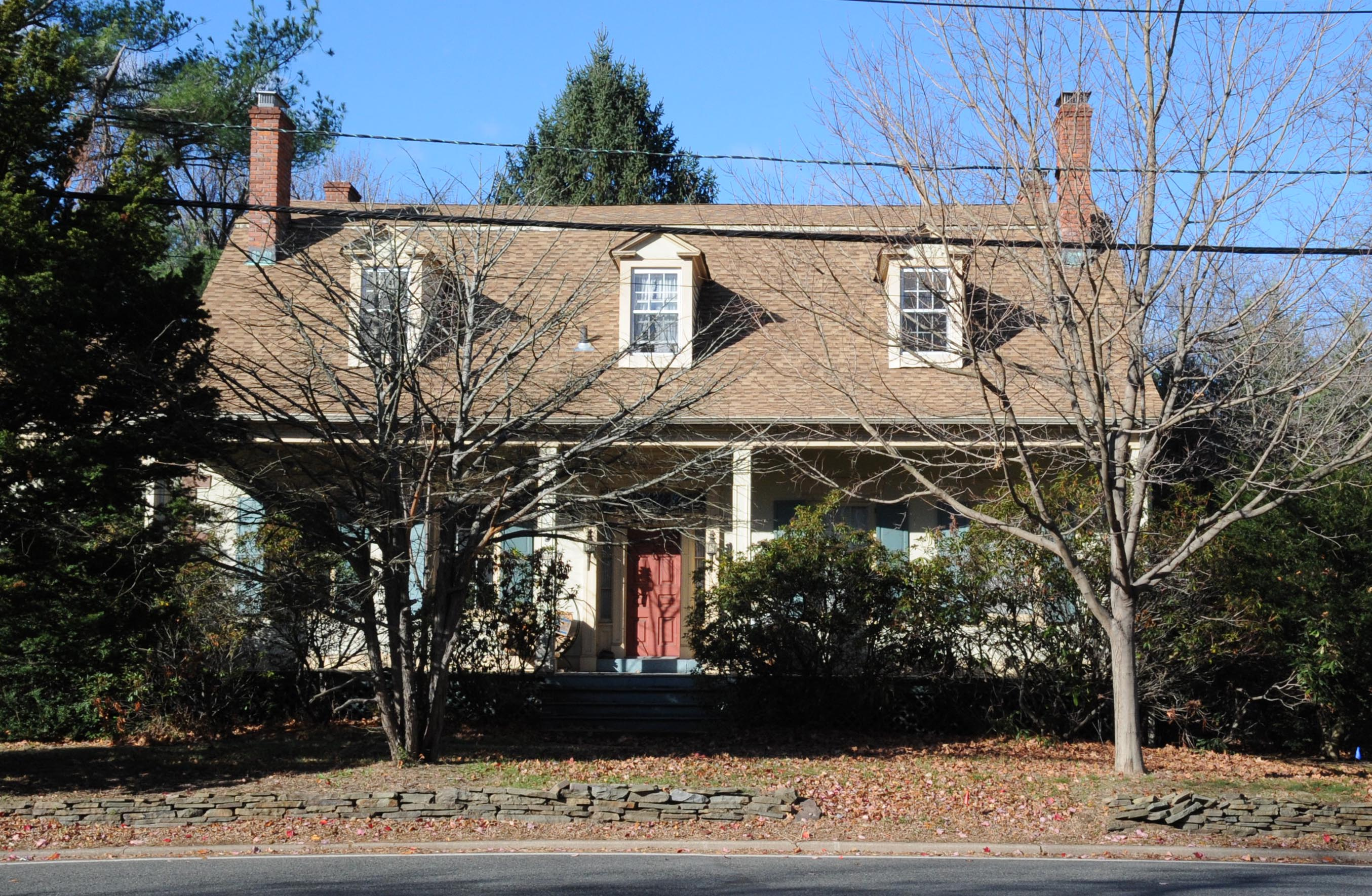
Harmon Van Dien House

Paramus is home to the following locations on the National Register of Historic Places:

- Easton Tower – Intersection of Red Mill Road and Paramus Road (added 2007). The tower was built in 1899 and was originally housed as a water pump that sits alongside the Saddle River. The tower was named after businessman Edward D. Easton.
- Midland School – 239 W. Midland Avenue (added 1978). The school was constructed in 1876, and was used as a branch of the Paramus Public Library after Midland School was moved.
- Terhune House – 470 Paramus Road (added 1996). An 18th-century Dutch Colonial home constructed of sandstone, that was later modified to add Victorian features, including a mansard roof.
- Terhune-Gardner-Lindenmeyr House – 218 Paramus Road (added 1972). A Federal Period home constructed on the last remaining portion of untouched land from Terhune's farm, as taken from the original Zabriskie patent. The oldest known portion that can be reliably dated is from 1807 to 1808, with an older adjoining section of the house dating back as far as 1707.
- Harmon Van Dien House – 449 Paramus Road (added 1983).
- Albert J. Zabriskie Farmhouse – 7 East Ridgewood Avenue (added 1977).
- Zabriskie Tenant House – 273 Dunkerhook Road (added 1984). The house was demolished in July 2012 by a housing developer who owned the property, after efforts to preserve or relocate the house failed.

=== Other points of interest ===
- Buehler Challenger and Science Center, located on the campus of Bergen Community College, is a space museum where children learn about outer space and missions through simulations. The science center is also available to adults and educators.
- Fritz Behnke Historical Museum, located on Paramus Road. It is open every Sunday and has exhibits about Paramus' past.
- New Jersey Children's Museum. Opened in 1992, it featured hands-on exhibits for children such as a fire truck, a news studio, a helicopter, and other fun pretend attractions that drew 700,000 visitors per year. It closed in 2014 after Valley Hospital bought the property near its Ridgewood location.

== Emergency services ==
=== Fire and rescue services ===
The Paramus Fire Department is a volunteer fire department that has a total of about 130 members who are on call around-the-clock, 365 days a year. Over the last several years, the number of calls for service that the fire department has responded to averages about 1,300 calls per year. The mission of the Paramus Fire Department is to protect the lives and property of the community. The fire department comprises four fire companies:

- Fire Company 1 (Engine 1 and Ladder Truck 1) is located at East Firehouse Lane, across from the Fashion Center.
- Fire Company 2 (Engine 2 and Engine 22) is located on Spring Valley Road, and is nicknamed "Spring Valley Fire Company #2".
- Fire Company 3 (Engine 3, Special Services Unit 3, Utility 3, and Foam 3 – which carries AFFF firefighting foam) is located at 198 West Midland Avenue.
- Fire Company 4 (Engine 4, Ladder Truck 4, and Engine 44 – a mini-pumper) is on Farview Avenue, and is nicknamed "Farview Fire Company #4".

Paramus also has a separate volunteer rescue squad (Rescue 7 & Rescue 9) located on West Jockish Square that specializes in motor vehicle extrication, as well as a marine unit for responses involving water rescues. The rescue squad eventually became a fifth fire company on December 1, 2025.

=== Ambulance and police ===
The borough's Emergency Medical Services department is staffed 24 hours a day. A separate volunteer Ambulance Corps exists, largely for stand-by purposes at large events. The Volunteer Ambulance Corps station is located on East Midland Avenue. The Paramus Police Department, which responds to 60,000 calls annually, is located on Carlough Drive right next to borough hall.

=== Emergency management ===
The borough of Paramus has an emergency management department that is required by state and law to develop emergency plans to protect people and property in the event of any emergency or disaster. The Emergency Management offices are located on Carlough Drive in the Paramus Life Safety Complex next to borough hall, the police department, and Fire Company #5.

== In popular culture ==
- Rock band Black Sabbath made stops in Paramus during their Paranoid Tour in 1970 and 1971.
- The season four premiere episode of the CBS Afternoon Playhouse entitled "Portrait of a Teenage Shoplifter" (aired December 1, 1981) was filmed in Paramus at Paramus High School and Paramus Park.
- Rockapella, the a cappella group best known for performing on the children's game show Where in The World Is Carmen Sandiego?, had their first public gig at the former Bamberger's store (currently Macy's) at Garden State Plaza on October 11, 1986, after performing at a private party in Oradell six months earlier.
- The 1993 Saturday Night Live spin-off movie Coneheads is set in Paramus. Dan Aykroyd and Jane Curtin's characters decide to move to and permanently reside in the borough so daughter Michelle Burke can attend Paramus High School. Aykroyd's character "Beldar Conehead" spends his days in Paramus giving driving lessons and playing golf.
- Scenes from the 2008 film Burn After Reading by the Coen Brothers were filmed in Paramus at the site of the old Tower Records annex building located on Route 17S that had been transformed into Hardbodies Fitness Center.
- A scene from the 1996 film Ransom was filmed on Route 4 in Paramus where Mullen is driving to Stone Quarry.
- Paramus was one of the filming locations in the 1986 film Something Wild.
- Several episodes of the HBO crime drama The Sopranos used Paramus locations. Throughout the series, Garden State Plaza and the Ramsey Outdoor store (the now closed store in Ramsey) on Route 17 were both featured, and a character (Matthew Bevilacqua) was "whacked" at the remnants of the Old Mill Bathing Beach on Paramus Road. Also near the Garden State Plaza, Tony Soprano uses a pay phone in front of the Hannah Krause store on Rt 17. In the series finale, a scene with Paulie Gualtieri was filmed in Paramus, in which he drove past a gas station.
- The Real Housewives of New Jersey frequently film in Paramus locations as Jennifer Aydin, a star of the show since 2018, lives in Paramus.
- Avril Lavigne performed at Westfield Garden State Plaza on March 17, 2004, as part of her Live by Surprise Tour.
- The 2005 Sesame Street direct-to-video All Star Alphabet, featuring Stephen Colbert and Nicole Sullivan, was filmed on location at Garden State Plaza.
- The former Paramus Bowling Center was the filming site of the bowling competition shows Make That Spare and Championship Bowling.
- Hanson's 1997 video "Tulsa, Tokyo & the Middle of Nowhere", features the band travelling to Paramus Park on May 7, 1997, performing in the food court in front of 600 screaming fans. The performance was their first public appearance after the release of "MMMBop".
- Garden State Plaza is the setting for Tricia Sullivan's science fiction novel Maul (2002). The novel takes its title from the way that the word "mall" is pronounced with the New Jersey accent. In the novel, three teenage girls start a shoot out with a local gang.
- American ska punk band Less Than Jake has a song entitled 24 Hours in Paramus on their 1995 album Losers, Kings and Things We Don't Understand.
- The ABC situational hidden camera show, What Would You Do? filmed some episodes in Paramus at the Tom Sawyer Diner.
- Van Saun Park was the location of Sal's punishment in the Season 5 episode of the Impractical Jokers TV series entitled "Ruffled Feathers" in 2016.
- Paramus was also the site for another episode of Impractical Jokers guest starring Joey Fatone in 2024 as his punishment. This time, it took place at Powerhouse Studios.
- The 2026 Netflix teen drama film, Don't Say Good Luck, starring Sunny Sandler, the daughter of actor and comedian Adam Sandler, filmed some scenes at Paramus Park.

== Notable people ==
People who were born in, residents of, or otherwise closely associated with Paramus include:

- John Bancker Aycrigg (1798–1856), member of the United States Congress from New Jersey
- Joe Benigno (born 1953), sports radio personality on WFAN on Joe & Evan show with Evan Roberts
- Chase Blackburn (born 1983), linebacker for the New York Giants and a member of the Super Bowl XLII and Super Bowl XLVI champion Giants
- Juwann Bushell-Beatty (born 1996), offensive lineman for the Ottawa Redblacks of the Canadian Football League
- Galit Chait (born 1975), ice dancer who represented Israel internationally from 1995 to 2006
- Lizabeth Cohen (born 1952), historian, college professor and author, whose 2003 work A Consumer's Republic builds on her experience growing up in post-war Paramus
- Joseph Coniglio (born 1943), former member of the New Jersey Senate
- Paul Contillo (1929–2024), politician who served in both houses of the New Jersey Legislature after serving on the Paramus Borough Council from 1971 to 1973
- Howard Cross III, American football nose tackle for the Notre Dame Fighting Irish
- Stacey Dash (born 1967), film and television actress who appeared in the 1995 film Clueless and its TV spinoff
- Spero Dedes (born 1979), Los Angeles Lakers radio commentator, NFL Network television host, and CBS NCAA tournament basketball announcer
- Bill DeMott (born 1966), retired professional wrestler and road agent best known for his appearances with World Championship Wrestling as Hugh Morrus and World Wrestling Federation/Entertainment under his real name
- Jim Dray (born 1986), tight ends coach for the Chicago Bears who played in the NFL for the Arizona Cardinals
- Warren Farrell (born 1943), educator, gender equality activist and author
- Fat Joe (born 1970), rapper, actor, CEO of Terror Squad Entertainment, and member of musical groups D.I.T.C. and Terror Squad
- Mark Fields (born c. 1961), former Ford Motor Company President and Chief Executive Officer
- Dean Friedman (born 1955), one-hit wonder with the top tune "Ariel" in 1977, which includes lyrics mentioning "the waterfall in Paramus Park"
- Fred C. Galda (c. 1918–1997), former mayor of Paramus who oversaw the implementation of the borough's blue laws in 1958
- Peter Gennaro (1919–2000), Tony Award-winning dancer and choreographer
- Matt Ghaffari (born 1961), Olympic wrestler
- Jamie Gold (born 1969), winner of the 2006 World Series of Poker
- Victoria Herrmann, polar geographer and climate change communicator
- Matt Hunter (born 1998), singer, songwriter and voice actor
- Charles Samuel Joelson (1916–1999), politician who represented New Jersey's 8th congressional district
- Louis F. Kosco (born 1932), politician who served in both the New Jersey General Assembly and the New Jersey Senate
- Joseph Lagana (born 1978), member of the New Jersey Senate since 2018
- Lloyd Levin (born 1958), film producer whose work includes United 93
- Tony Lip (1930–2013), actor who appeared on The Sopranos, playing the role of Carmine Lupertazzi, and whose story was dramatized in the Oscar-winning film Green Book
- Howard Lorber (born 1948), CEO of the Vector Group
- Dan Lorenzo, musician, guitarist and composer
- Jimmy Lyon (1921–1984), jazz pianist
- Herbert F. Maddalene (born 1928), architect best known for his work designing churches with the firm of Genovese & Maddalene
- Trisha Meili, the "Central Park jogger", a 28-year-old woman who was raped and beaten while jogging in New York City's Central Park in 1989
- Bob Menendez (born 1954), politician who represented New Jersey in the United States Senate from 2006 until his resignation in 2024
- Liv Morgan (born 1994), professional wrestler
- Dean Obeidallah (born 1969), Arab / Italian-American comedian
- George Olsen (1893–1971), bandleader and proprietor of Olsen's Restaurant in the 1950s and 1960s
- Ken Oringer (born 1965), chef
- Jeffrey B. Perry (1946–2022), independent scholar, historian and labor activist
- John Bartow Prevost (1766–1825), first Judge of the Superior Court of the Territory of Orleans
- Kenneth W. Regan (born 1959), professor, chess player, statistician and computer scientist
- John Robertson (born 1993), quarterback for the Villanova Wildcats football team who won the 2014 Walter Payton Award
- Ira Rubin (1930–2013), world champion professional contract bridge player
- Gary Saul Stein (born 1933), attorney and former Associate Justice on the New Jersey Supreme Court, who served for 17 years where he wrote over 365 published opinions
- Nick Suriano (born 1997), freestyle and folkstyle wrestler, NCAA wrestling champion at Rutgers and Michigan
- Kazbek Tambi (born 1961), former professional soccer player
- Steven H. Temares (born 1958), Chief Executive Officer of Bed, Bath & Beyond
- Theodore Trautwein (1920–2000), judge who sentenced a reporter from The New York Times to 40 days in jail in the "Dr. X" trial of Mario Jascalevich
- Connie Wagner (born 1948), member of the New Jersey General Assembly from 2008 to 2013
- Yoojin Grace Wuertz (born 1980), novelist who wrote the 2017 book Everything Belongs To Us
- Elaine Zayak (born 1965), one of the world's top figure skaters in the early 1980s
