= Kristian Regale =

Beverage company

Kristian Regále is a non-alcoholic beverage company based in Paramus, New Jersey. It is most known for its Swedish American roots and sparkling apple cider.

== History ==
The company was founded in 1988 when Nancy Bieraugel purchased apple cider syrup from the Herrljunga Cider company in Herrljunga, Sweden. The beverage was bottled in New Ulm, Minnesota, by August Schell Brewing Company. The Bieraugel family purchased the glass and other packaging from the brewery, and moved the production to Cold Spring, Minnesota. They spent nearly 20 years building a niche business that serviced grocery retailers across the country with the non-alcoholic beverage. Participating in Swedish events honoring "New Sweden" in 1988 began the launch, and the packaging and name were redesigned with help from friends in the food business. The first grocery stores Kristian Regále was sold in were the Byerly's and Lund's stores in Minneapolis. IKEA then became the next company, and over the years a warehouse and broker distributor network across the United States were built. In 1992, Bieraugel formed a partnership with Jack Berntson, former owner of Skandia Foods, the largest US importer of Scandinavian food products. She purchased the Kristian Regále company from Bentson in 2004, and in 2005 sold the majority of the business to a partnership group consisting of former executives of major food companies, such as Bestfoods, Smart Balance, and Doherty Enterprises.

Around 2000, Bieraugel moved her beverage production to Spain in order to service IKEA worldwide. Under her guidance all the recipes are now owned by Kristian Regále.

== Flavors ==
Kristian Regále started as a sparkling apple cider. The pear flavor, also made by Herrljunga Cider, was later added. Because lingonberries are stereotypically "Swedish" – and Bieraugel loved cranberry-apple – she developed her own recipe for lingonberry-apple as well as blackcurrant and peach flavors.

The company's tag line is "It's Time to Sparkle".
