= Terhune House (Paramus, New Jersey) =

Historic house in New Jersey, United States

- Rutan-Terhune-Bidwell House
- U.S. National Register of Historic Places
- New Jersey Register of Historic Places
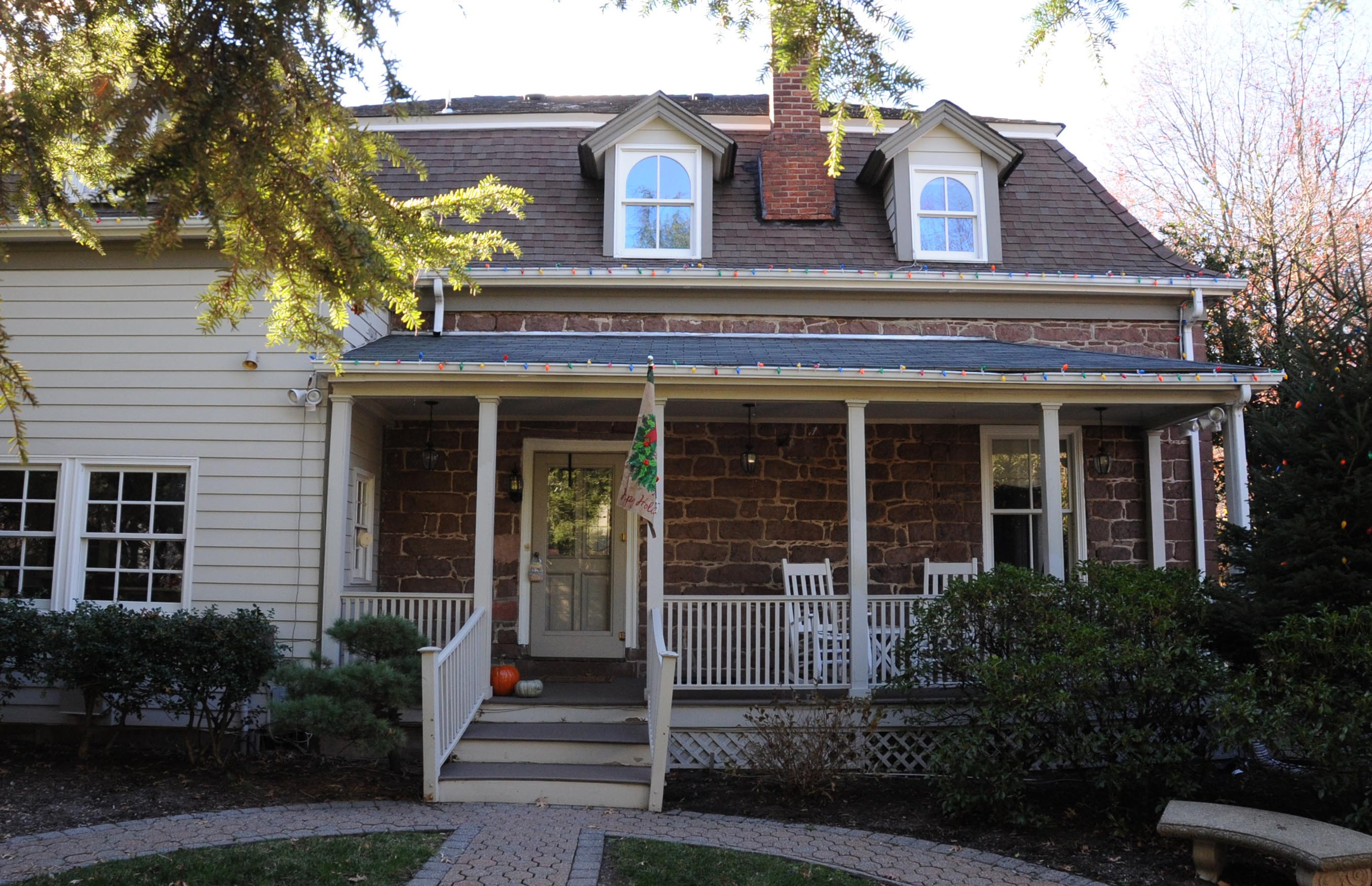
- Terhune House in 2015

- Location within Bergen County, New Jersey Location within New Jersey Location within the United States
- Location: 470 Paramus Road, Paramus, New Jersey
- Coordinates: 40°59′48″N 73°57′46″W
- Area: 0 acres (0 ha)
- MPS: Stone Houses of Bergen County TR
- NRHP reference No.: 82005390
- NJRHP No.: 2959

Significant dates
- Added to NRHP: February 28, 1996
- Designated NJRHP: October 3, 1980

Rutan-Terhune-Bidwell House is located in Paramus, Bergen County, New Jersey, United States. The house was added to the National Register of Historic Places on February 28, 1996.

== See also ==
- National Register of Historic Places listings in Bergen County, New Jersey
