= Augustinian Academy (Staten Island) =

Coordinates: 40.6162°N 74.0951°W

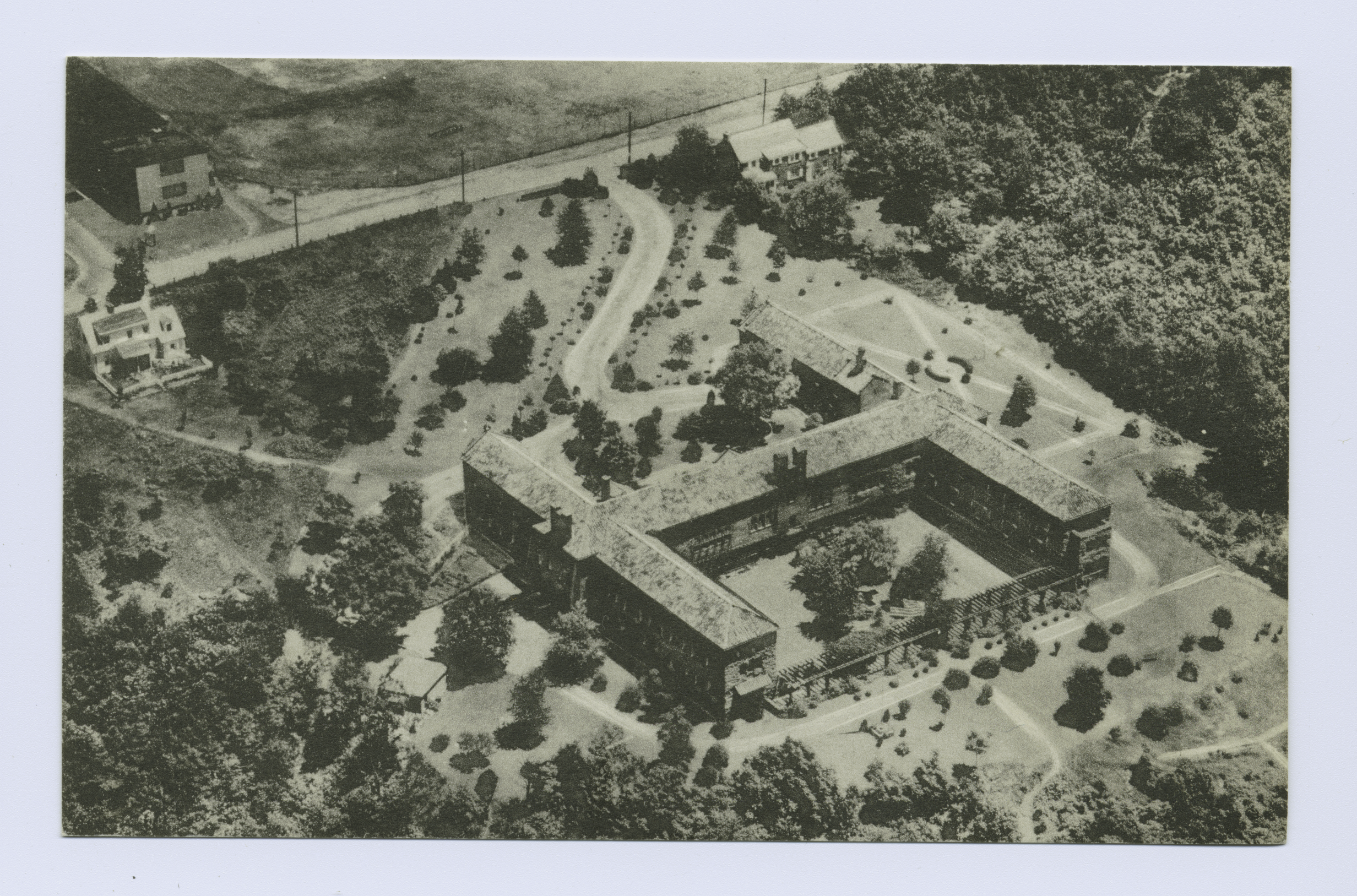
- Grymes Hill campus (1926–1969)
- Interactive map of the Augustinian Academy area

General information
- Location: Staten Island, New York City, United States
- Completed: 1899 (Tompkinsville), 1926 (Grymes Hill)
- Demolished: 2006 (Grymes Hill)
- Client: Roman Catholic Archdiocese of New York

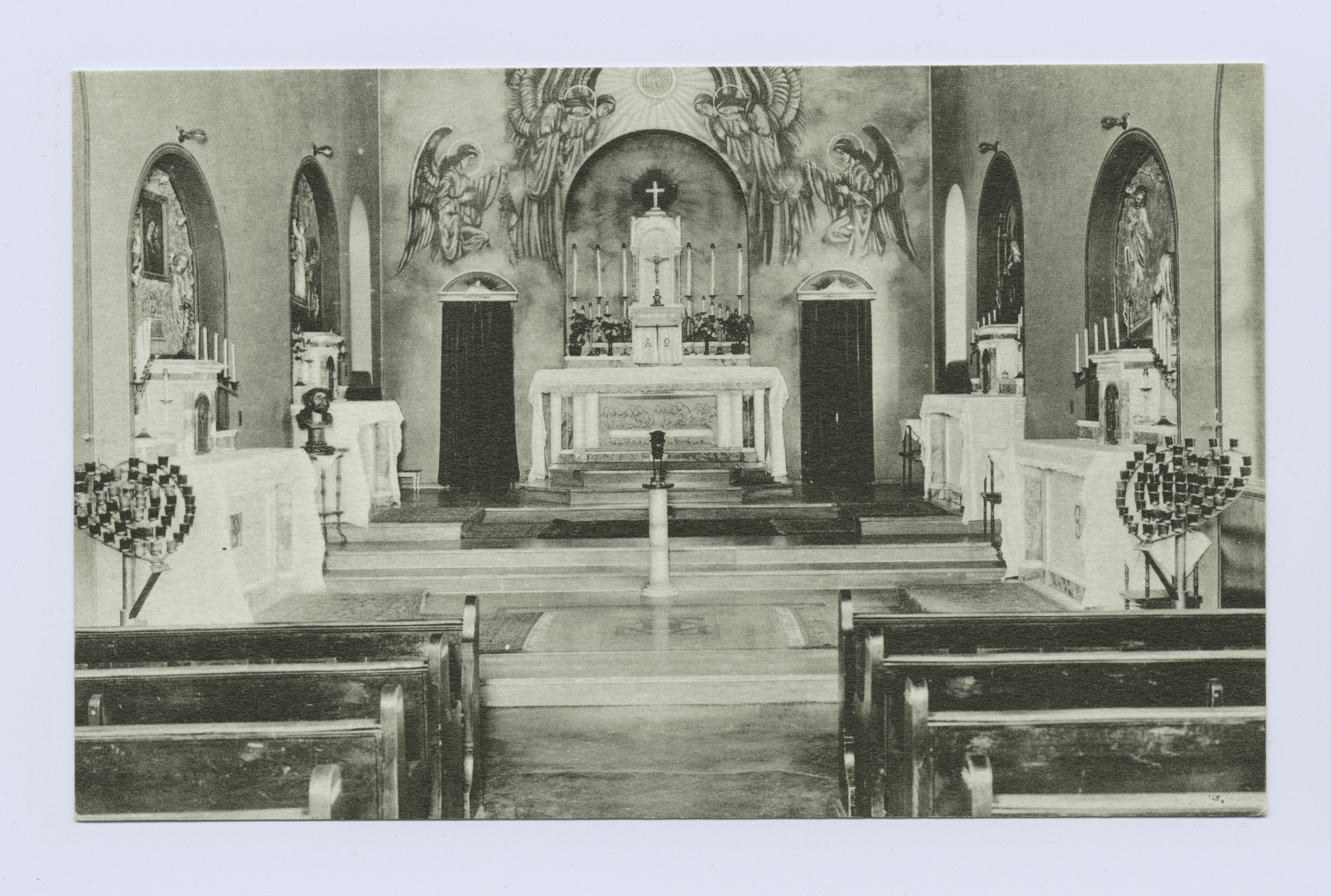
Interior of academy chapel

The Augustinian Academy on Staten Island, New York, was founded on May 30, 1899, in conjunction with the new Roman Catholic parish of Our Lady of Good Counsel, both by the Augustinian Friars. The academy expanded in 1926 and closed in 1969. During its life, it added 245 priests to the Augustinian order.

== History ==
The academy's original buildings were first erected for the Visitation Sisters, and were purchased and modified by the Augustinians for educational purposes. The academy was dedicated on September 10, 1899, by Sebastiano Martinelli, O.E.S.A., an Augustinian friar from Italy and archbishop who was then serving as the Apostolic Delegate to the United States. It opened officially on September 13 as "The Catholic High School of Richmond Borough". This was the first Catholic settlement in Tompkinsville, and the first Mass in the neighborhood was celebrated on November 12, 1899, in McRobert's Hall on Arietta Street, now Victory Boulevard. Our Lady of Good Counsel occupied the large chapel in the academy building, along with the small chapel of Our Lady of Consolation, erected in 1902 on Saint Paul's Avenue.

The original program of study comprised classical, commercial and grammar courses, and was soon accredited by the University of the State of New York. The valuation of the academy and church property was about $100,000 in 1914, equivalent to $3,000,000 in 2025. On May 30, 1909, commemorating the 10th anniversary of the academy's founding, the Ancient Order of Hibernians presented the academy with a handsome 100-foot flagpole and a large American flag.

Among the properties that the academy owned, and founded, was a site in Morrisania, Bronx, on the east side of Andrews Avenue, 200 feet south of Fordham Road. The structure would be a two-story brick school, 54x100 feet, built in 1906 to the design of architect J. O'Connor for $50,000, for the now-closed St. Augustine's School.

The academy began educating boys for the priesthood in 1921. It expanded to a 16-acre site in the Grymes Hill neighborhood in 1926, but finally closed in 1969. The Tompkinsville property became the offices and parochial school of Good Counsel Church. The Grymes Hill property was used as a retreat house until 1983, acquired by Wagner College in 1993, then heavily damaged by fires, and ultimately razed in 2006.

== Legacy ==
"During its 70 years of existence, Augustinian Academy graduated approximately 1,348 men and added about 250 priests to the Augustinian order." One nationally prominent graduate was Edmund Dobbin from the Class of 1953, who went on to become the president of Villanova University.

In 2009, New York City renamed the academy's former location on Grymes Hill as "Augustinian Academy Way". In 2012, Good Counsel Church dedicated its Augustinian Academy Historical Monument, including the bell from the school's demolished tower.
