= Van Saun County Park =

Park in New Jersey

Coordinates: 40.929661°N 74.047937°W

- Interactive map of Van Saun County Park
- Location: Paramus, New Jersey and River Edge, New Jersey
- Area: 130 acres
- Created: 1960; 66 years ago
- Owner: Bergen County Department of Parks
- Public transit: NJ Transit bus: 168, 752
- Website: bergencountynj.gov/bergen-county-department-of-parks/van-saun-county-park/

Van Saun County Park is a park in Paramus and River Edge, New Jersey operated by the Bergen County Parks Department. The park is home to the Bergen County Zoological Park, open all year round and charging admission from May to October. The zoo features a ridable miniature railroad known as the Safari Express. In addition, the park features picnic areas, a baseball field, a softball field, basketball and tennis courts, a soccer field, a playground, a carousel, and pony rides. The park was originally a farm owned by the Van Saun family.

The park, including the zoo, was slated for a major expansion as of 2016, which would nearly double the size of the zoo from 12 to 23 acres (4.9 to 9.3 ha) and significantly diversify its population of animal species, as well as add an ice-skating rink and expand automobile parking capacity at the park by hundreds of spaces.

== History ==
Before it was a park, George Washington watered his horse in a spring within the land in 1780 during the Continental Army's occupation of the area. This led the spring to become a historic site within the park.

In 1957, Bergen County purchased the farm from the Van Saun family.

The zoo opened in 1960. Its railroad, the Van Saun Park Railroad, was first built in 1963 and features three trains: the 388 train, which accompanied the opening, the 389 train, purchased in 1968, and the 520, added to the lineup in 1971. The train models are Iron Horse S-24 2 ft (610 mm) narrow-gauge trains by the Allan Herschell Company. The train is open all week between April and October, weather permitting. The train passengers view the many different attractions in the zoo while going through railroad crossings and a tunnel. The train is also open during the Bergen County's Winter Wonderland event, which runs from November through January.

In 2000, a carousel was built, featuring horses and other zoo animals as seats. It is open from every day through April and October, weather permitting. It is also open during Bergen County's Winter Wonderland event, which runs from November through January. The carousel has been controversial due to concerns over the owner's lack of insurance. Ever since the Golden Horse Carousel at Paramus Park closed in 2013 and the Venetian Carousel at Garden State Plaza closed in 2016, this carousel at Van Saun Park is the last remaining operating carousel in the entire borough of Paramus.

In addition, pony rides are available at Van Saun Park from April to October. Riders are taken around a small track where the pony is pulled by an employee.

The park has Harmony Playground with a water sprinkler which is open seasonally, and soccer, softball, and baseball fields which are open all year round.

In 2013, Van Saun opened up a dog park, consisting of one area for smaller dogs and another area for larger dogs.

As of 2016, plans were made to expand the zoo, which would nearly double its size from 12 to 23 acres and significantly diversify its population of animal species.

The zoo was the location of Sal's punishment in the Season 5 episode of the Impractical Jokers TV series entitled "Ruffled Feathers" in 2016.

== Annual events ==
The park has some annual events which typically occur in October. Zoo Boo is an event held around Halloween, including trick-or-treating in the park, ghost stories, and magic shows. The park's train provides evening rides during this event, where actors in costumes try to scare guests. Also around Halloween is the Metro Howl-O-Ween Bassett Bash, during which many Basset Hounds dress up in different costumes for Halloween and participate in trick-or-treating and contests. It has been held annually since 1997 and is hosted by the Metro Basset Hound Club. In addition, the Art in the Park event is also held annually in October. Artists are judged on their artwork, with the potential to receive cash prizes. Afterward, there is a concert.

The park also holds events in the Christmas winter season, notably Winter Wonderland, an annual event held from November–January with a holiday theme. The event has attractions including an outdoor ice rink, a beer garden, the Santa's North Pole Workshop, and food and drink stands. The trains and carousel are operational during the event if weather permits. Also in December the Holiday with the Animals event. Guests can visit to Santa Claus and see the animals open up presents from Santa.

The park holds its own annual Easter Egg Hunt, the Van Saun Park Easter Egg Hunt. Following the egg hunt, there is storytelling and crafts for the children.

== Incidents ==
In 1990, an ocelot seriously injured a boy at the zoo by biting one of his hands. Three years later, another ocelot attacked another boy.

== Public transportation ==
The park provides public transportation from New Jersey Transit bus lines 168 & 752. The 752 does not provide services on Sundays.

== Gallery ==
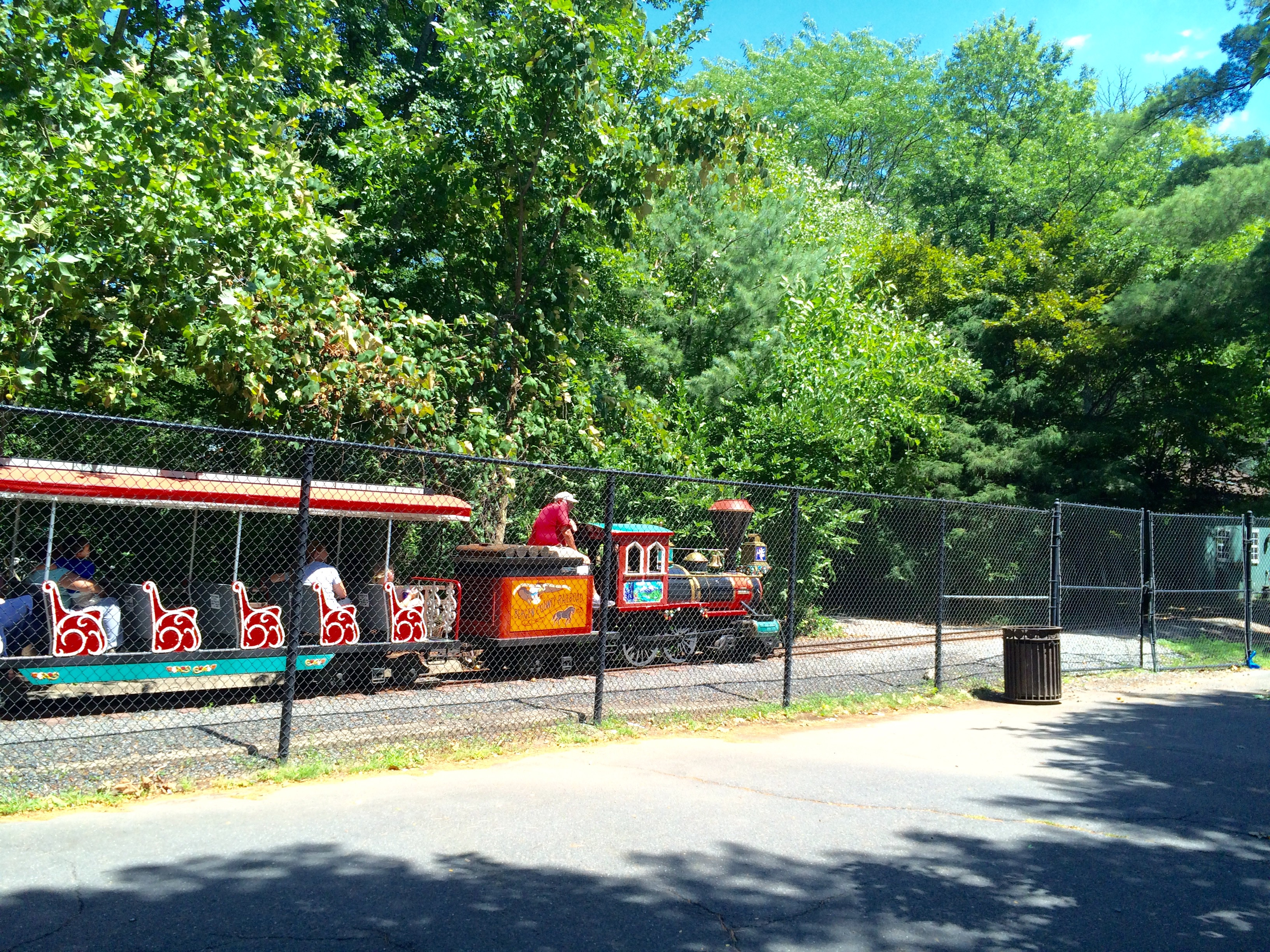
The Van Saun Park 520 train, one of the three trains used in the park.

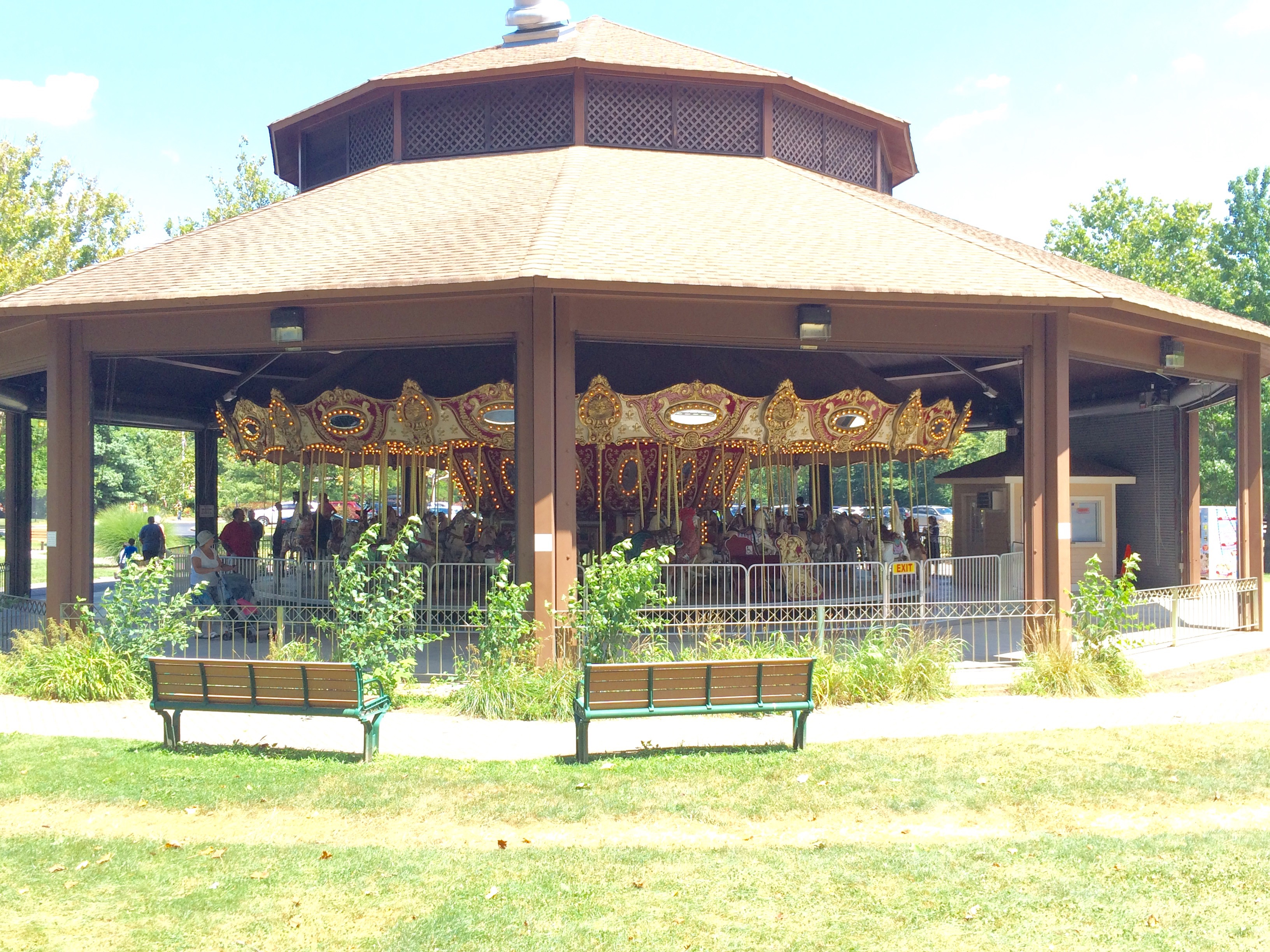
The Van Saun Park carousel.

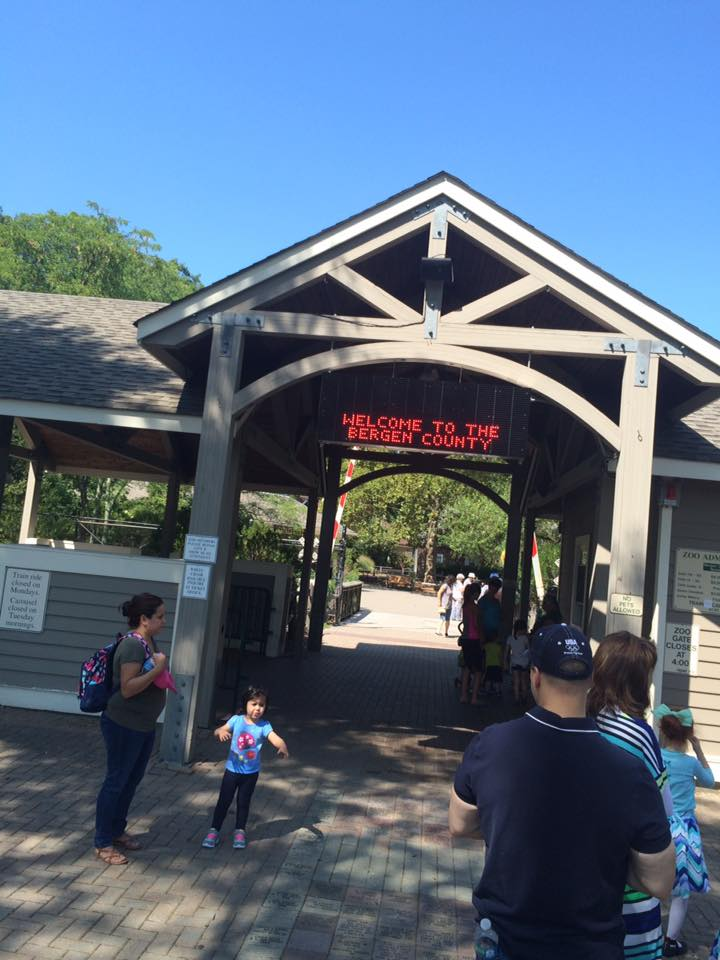
The front entrance to the Van Saun Park zoo.

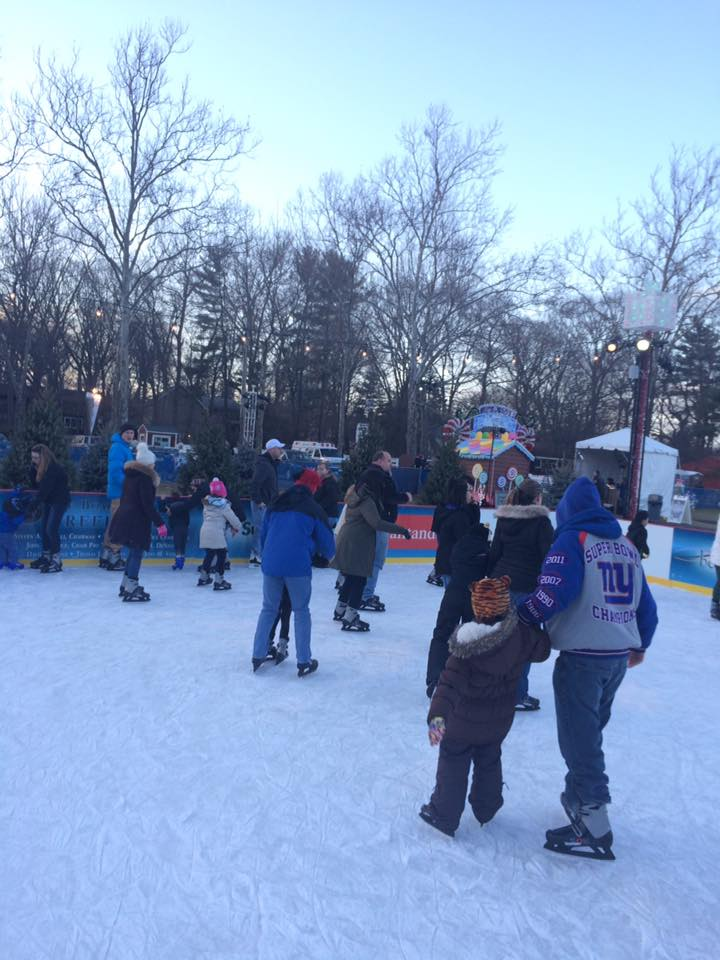
The ice rink at Van Saun Park during the Winter Wonderland event.
