= Peter M. Donohue =

American academic administrator and priest

The Reverend Peter Donohue OSA

32nd President of Villanova University
- Incumbent
- Assumed office September 8, 2006
- Preceded by: Edmund J. Dobbin

Personal details
- Born: February 28, 1952 (age 74) New York City, New York, U.S.
- Education: Villanova University (BA); Catholic University of America (MA); Washington Theological Union (MDiv); University of Illinois, Urbana-Champaign (PhD)

Peter M. Donohue OSA (born February 29, 1952) is an American Catholic priest and academic administrator who has served as the president of Villanova University since 2006. He had previously served as the chair of the school's Theatre department since 1992. He is a member of the Augustinian order.

== Early life and education ==
Donohue was born in The Bronx, and raised in Royal Oak, Michigan. Donohue received his bachelor's degree from Villanova University in 1975. Ordained in the Order of Saint Augustine in 1979, Donohue received his Master of Arts degree in theater from the Catholic University of America in 1983 and a Master of Divinity degree from Washington Theological Union in 1985. He obtained a Ph.D. in theater from the University of Illinois at Urbana-Champaign in 1990, while also managing the Krannert Center for the Performing Arts.

== Career ==
His early years as an educator were spent serving the St. Augustine Parish in Andover, Massachusetts, and at Archbishop John Carroll High School in Radnor, Pennsylvania From 1985 through 1990, he was an instructor in Villanova's Theater Department.

While at Villanova, he designed The Augustinian Connection, a history of the Augustinian Friars and their involvement with Villanova University, which is shown to all incoming Freshmen during New Student Orientation. He has served as a resident hall minister and as chaplain of Villanova's renowned Naval ROTC program, and presides over their annual commissioning Mass.

Donohue has served as a faculty representative on the Villanova Board of Trustees, the Academic Affairs Committee, the university's College of Liberal Arts & Sciences Diversity Committee, the university's Judicial Boards, the Strategic Planning Committee, the Fine Arts Subcommittee Curriculum Program, the College Diversity Subcommittee, the Planning Committee for the Church in the Modern World Conference, and the Preparation Committee for Rhodes Scholars Interviews. In addition, Donohue served on the Board of Trustees of Merrimack College from 1994 to 2002.

== Sources ==
- Biography, Villanova University web site
