= Edmund J. Dobbin =

The Reverend Edmund J. Dobbin OSA

President of Villanova University
- In office 1988–2006
- Preceded by: John M. Driscoll, OSA
- Succeeded by: Peter M. Donohue, OSA

Personal details
- Born: November 20, 1935 Brooklyn, New York, U.S.
- Died: March 8, 2015 (aged 79) Villanova, Pennsylvania, U.S.
- Education: Saint Clare School; Augustinian Academy; Villanova University (BA); Augustinian College (MA); Catholic University of America (MS, STL); University of Louvain (STD)

Edmund Joseph Dobbin (November 20, 1935 – March 8, 2015) was an American Catholic priest who served as president of Villanova University from 1988 to 2006. Raised in Brooklyn and Staten Island, New York, he was ordained as a priest of the Augustinian order (OSA) in 1962, and became a noted educator in theology and mathematics.

According to Villanova's statement announcing his death: "During his tenure as President, he heightened awareness of the Augustinian character of the University, significantly increased the school's endowment, and embarked on an expansion of the campus, its facilities, and its programs." The Philadelphia Inquirer added: "During Father Dobbin's tenure, Villanova basketball went national. He envisioned basketball as a way to help Villanova appear on the national stage." At the same time, he led Villanova academics to national recognition, and to a long string of annual rankings as the top Northeast regional university.
