= Our Lady of Good Counsel's Church (Staten Island) =

Church in New York, United States

Coordinates: 40°37′53.96″N 74°5′13.74″W

The Church of Our Lady of Good Counsel
- Interactive map of the The Church of Our Lady of Good Counsel area

General information
- Architectural style: Modernist
- Location: Tompkinsville, Staten Island, New York City, United States of America
- Completed: 1968
- Client: Roman Catholic Archdiocese of New York

Design and construction
- Architect: Genovese & Maddalene of Glen Rock, New Jersey (for 1968 church)

The Church of Our Lady of Good Counsel is a parish church in the Roman Catholic Archdiocese of New York, located at 10 Austin Place, Staten Island, New York City.

== History ==
The parish was established by the Augustinians on May 30, 1899, with the Rev. Nicholas J. Murphy, O.S.A. being the first pastor.

The first mass in Tompkinsville occurred November 12, 1899, in McRobert's Hall on Austin Place and Arietta Street (now Victory Boulevard). A large chapel in the building of the Augustinian Academy (Tompkinsville, Staten Island) "was used for parochial purposes with the chapel of Our Lady of Consolation in Tompkinsville. The chapel, which is situated on St. Paul's Avenue, was erected on February 2, 1902." It was enlarged and renovated in the summer of 1908 and the parish numbered around 400 in 1914. The second pastor, the Irish-born Rev. B.E. Daly, O.S.A., was a missionary before being appointed to the Tompkinsville parish on December 22, 1910.

The modern church building was designed by the architectural firm of Genovese & Maddalene of 175 Rock Road, Glen Rock, New Jersey. The firm also designed Manhattan's Church of the Nativity in 1968. Good Counsel's building was dedicated by Terence Cardinal Cooke on April 26, 1968. The adjacent parochial school and offices were previously the Augustinian Academy.

== Pastors ==
1. 1899–1910: Nicholas J. Murphy, O.S.A.
2. 1910– : B.E. Daly, O.S.A.
