= Genovese & Maddalene =

Former architectural firm

Coordinates: 40.96282°N 74.13343°W

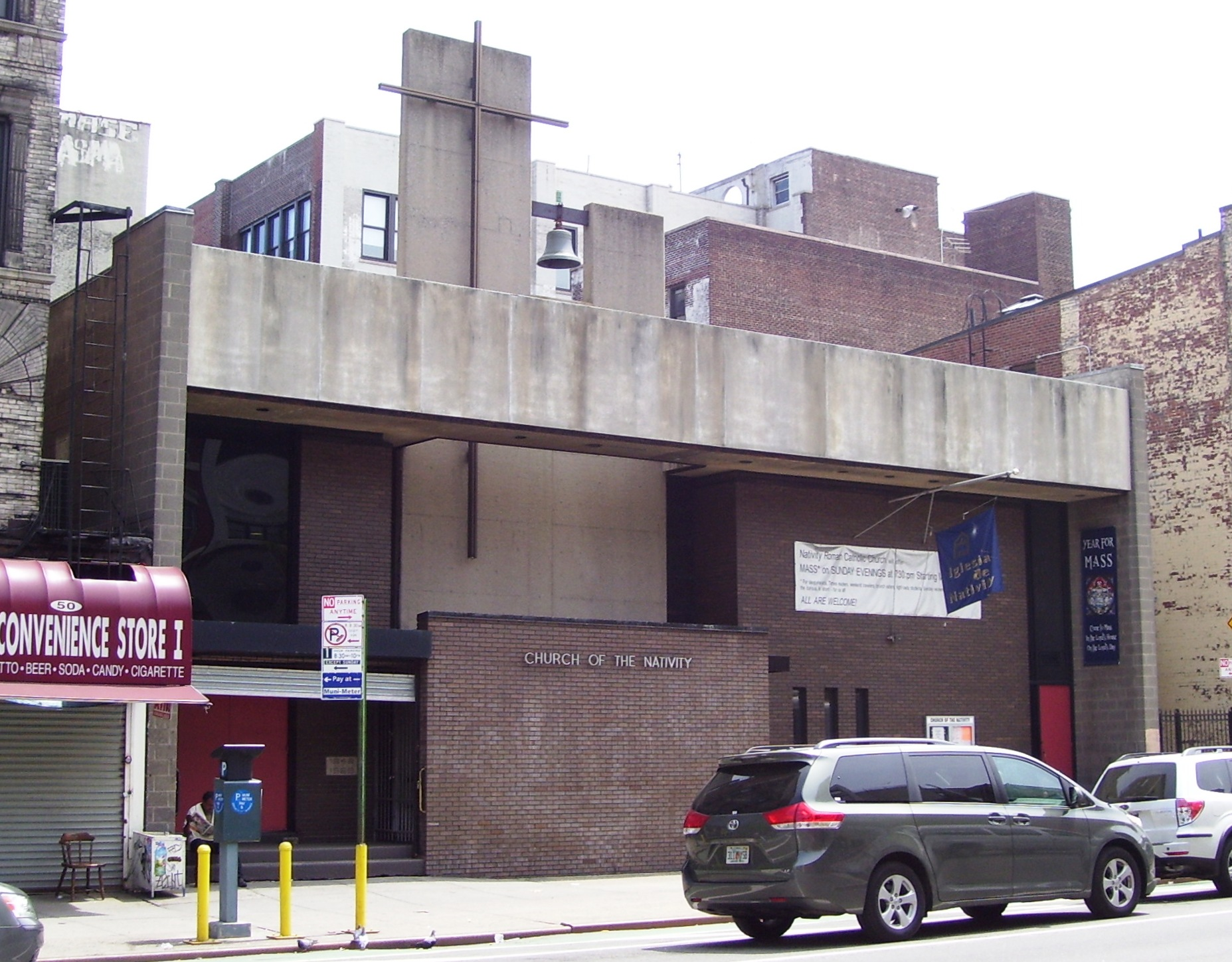
Church of the Nativity (1969-1970)

Genovese & Maddalene was an architectural firm established in 1963 by architects Anthony Vincent Genovese and Herbert F. Maddalene, based in Glen Rock, New Jersey that specialized in the design of churches. The address was 175 Rock Rd, Glen Rock, New Jersey 07452.

== Works ==
- 1967: Church of the Holy Name of Jesus (Rochester, New York) In 1970, 258 Sollas Court, Ridgewood, New Jersey 07450.
- 1968: Advent Lutheran Church (Wyckoff, New Jersey)
- 1969: Our Lady of Good Counsel Church (Staten Island, New York)
- 1969: Our Lady of Mt. Carmel Church (Staten Island, New York)
- 1969: Church of the Nativity (Manhattan)
- 1981: Church of the Most Blessed Sacrament (Franklin Lakes, New Jersey)
