= Church of the Nativity (Manhattan) =

Former Catholic Church in Manhattan, New York

Nativity Church
- Church of the Nativity
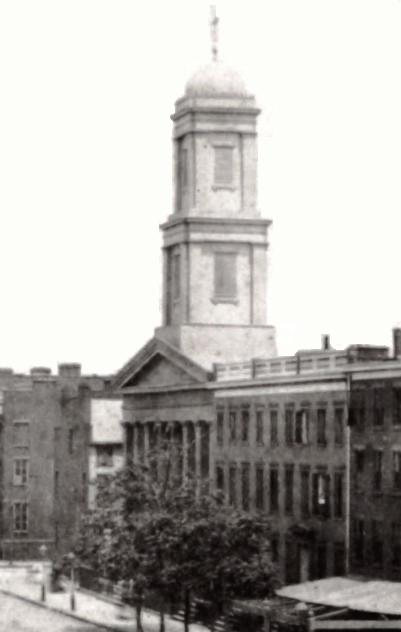
- ca. 1865, original church building
- Nativity Church
- 40°43′30.7″N 73°59′23.4″W
- Location: Manhattan, New York City, New York
- Address: 44 Second Avenue
- Country: United States
- Denomination: Catholic
- Previous denomination: Presbyterian (old church)

History
- Former name: Second Avenue Presbyterian Church
- Founder: Rev. Andrew Byrne
- Dedicated: June 5, 1842 (old church); November 30, 1969 (new church)
- Events: Fire in 1912

Architecture
- Architect(s): 1832 building: Town & Davis (Alexander Jackson Davis, J. H. Dakin, and James Gallier); 1969 building: Genovese & Maddalene
- Style: Greek Revival (1832 church); Modernist (1969 church)
- Groundbreaking: September 23, 1968 (new church)
- Completed: 1832 (old church); November 15, 1969 (new church)
- Construction cost: $240,000 (for 1968 church)
- Closed: August 1, 2015 (merged with Most Holy Redeemer Church (Manhattan))
- Demolished: 1968 (old church) 2022 (new church)

Administration
- Archdiocese: New York

The Church of the Nativity was a Catholic parish church in the Archdiocese of New York, located at 44 Second Avenue between Second and 3rd Streets in the East Village neighborhood of Manhattan, New York City. The parish was established in 1842 and permanently closed in 2015. It was administered by the Society of Jesus from 1917 until its closing.

== History ==
Nativity Parish was founded by the Catholic priest Andrew Byrne. With the authorization of Bishop John Hughes, he purchased the former Second Avenue Presbyterian Church, which was dedicated for use as a Catholic church by Hughes on June 5, 1842. Two years later, Byrne was named Bishop of Little Rock. George McCloskey served as the second pastor for over twenty-years, until in 1869 he resigned to become vicar general for his brother, Bishop William McCloskey of Louisville.

When St. John the Baptist Church on West 30th Street burned down in 1847, pastorship of St. John's parish was assumed by the Church of the Nativity until St. John's was rebuilt in 1851. On January 20, 1912, a fire broke out at Nativity, destroying the "historic organ" and interior.

In November 2014, the archdiocese announced that the Church of the Nativity was one of 31 of its parishes which would be merged with other parishes. The parish celebrated its final Mass on July 31, 2015. It was closed on August 1, 2015, and merged with nearby Most Holy Redeemer Parish.

The church was deconsecrated in June 2017. The church building was sold in 2020, for $40 million to real-estate developer. It had been suggested by some parishioners, that the church should be turned into a shrine for Dorothy Day, co-founder of the Catholic Worker Movement and candidate for sainthood. The Archdiocese said they would look into the idea, but the 2017 deconsecration and subsequent sale in 2020 made it clear that the idea would not move forward.

== Buildings ==
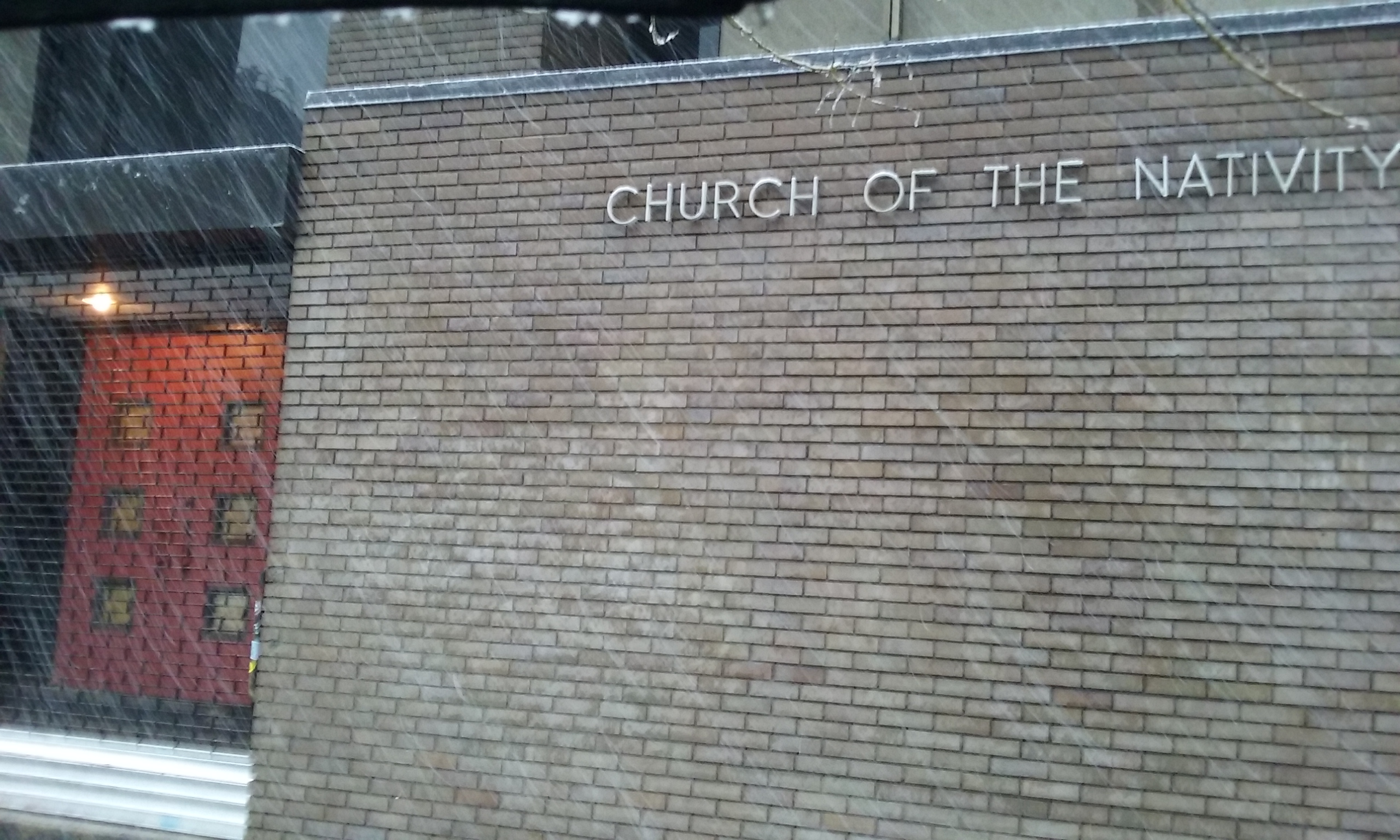
Church of the Nativity(Manhattan)

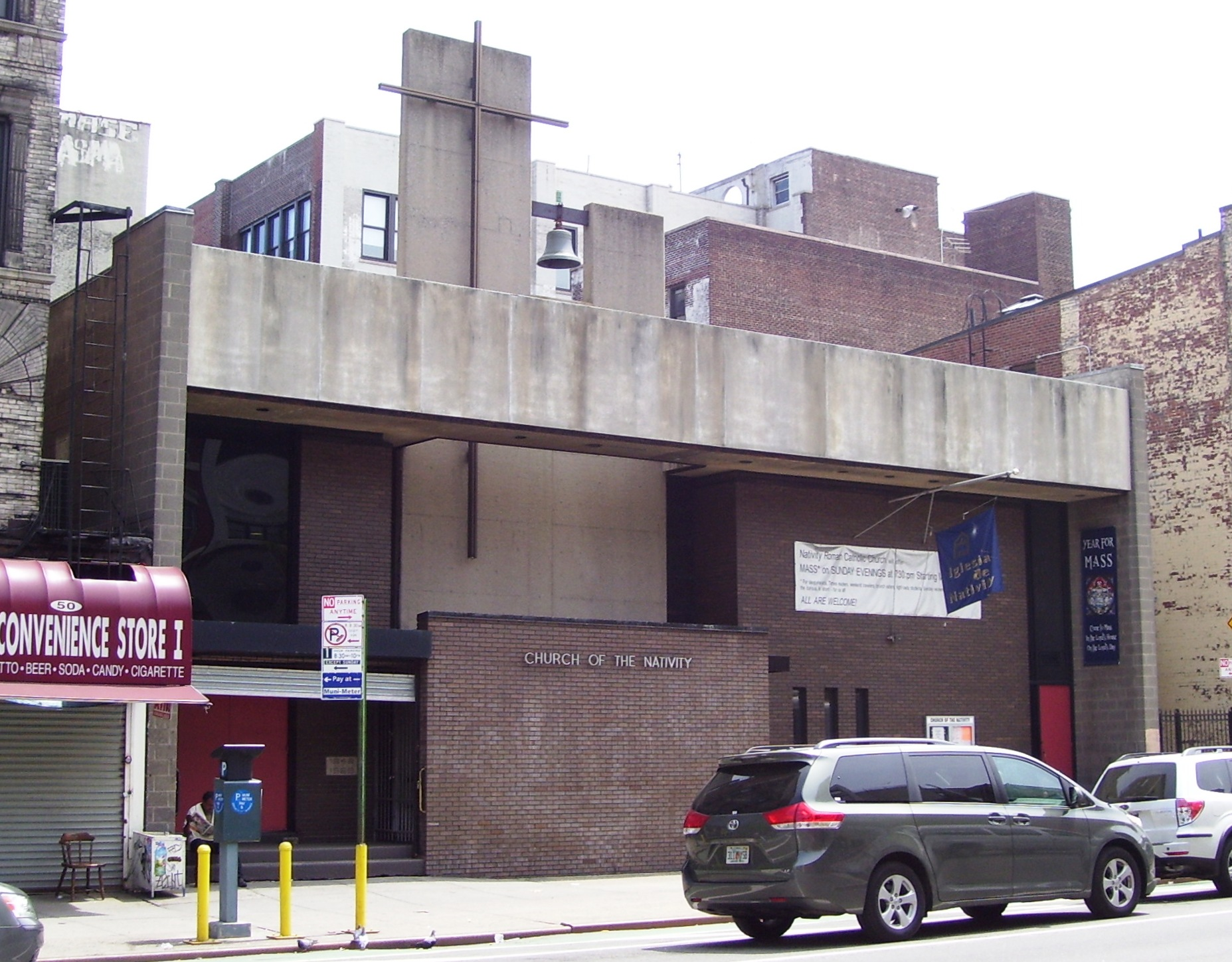
The 1968 church

The original painted-timber Greek Revival sanctuary was built in 1832 at 48 Second Avenue as the Second Avenue Presbyterian Church and was designed by the prominent New York firm of Town & Davis, which then included Alexander Jackson Davis, J. H. Dakin, and James Gallier. It consisted of a Greek Doric portico and two-stage steeple. In 1842, it was sold to the newly formed Nativity of Our Lord parish and became the Church of the Nativity. In 1966, the discovery of structural defects forced the closure of the church. In 1967, the parish council decided to demolish the old church and construct a new one. The old church was demolished in the spring of 1968.

The Modernist church was built at 44 Second Avenue from 1968 to 1970 for $240,000 to the designs of Genovese & Maddalene. It has been described as "starkly institutional" and "a modern architectural cartoon exhibiting a gross idea with no detail."

The parish included within its territory the headquarters of the Catholic Worker movement and was the site of the Funeral Mass of its co-founder, Dorothy Day, in December 1980.

The church was deconsecrated in 2017 and sold to developers. In 2022 the deconsecrated building was demolished.
