= George Washington Bridge Plaza =

Toll plaza in Fort Lee, New Jersey, US

- Bridge Plaza
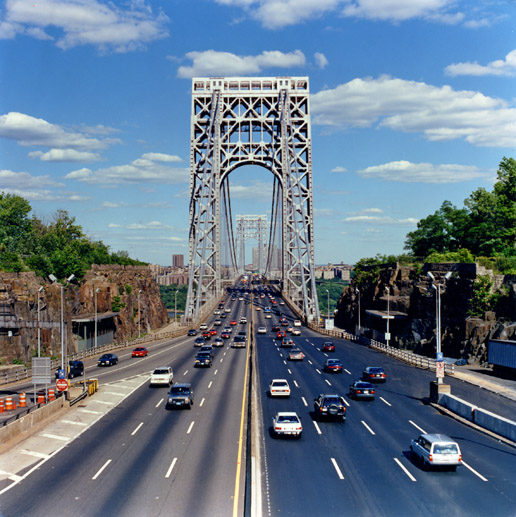
- View looking east to the bridge, south of which is Fort Lee Historic Park, contiguous with Palisades Interstate Park.
- Interactive map of George Washington Bridge Plaza

Location
- Fort Lee, Bergen County, New Jersey
- Coordinates: 40.855°N 73.969°W
- Roads at junction: I-95 / N.J. Turnpike; US 1-9 / US 46; US 9W; Route 67 Route 4 CR 505 Palisades Parkway

Construction
- Type: Interchange and transit hub
- Opened: 1931
- Maintained by: Port Authority of New York and New Jersey

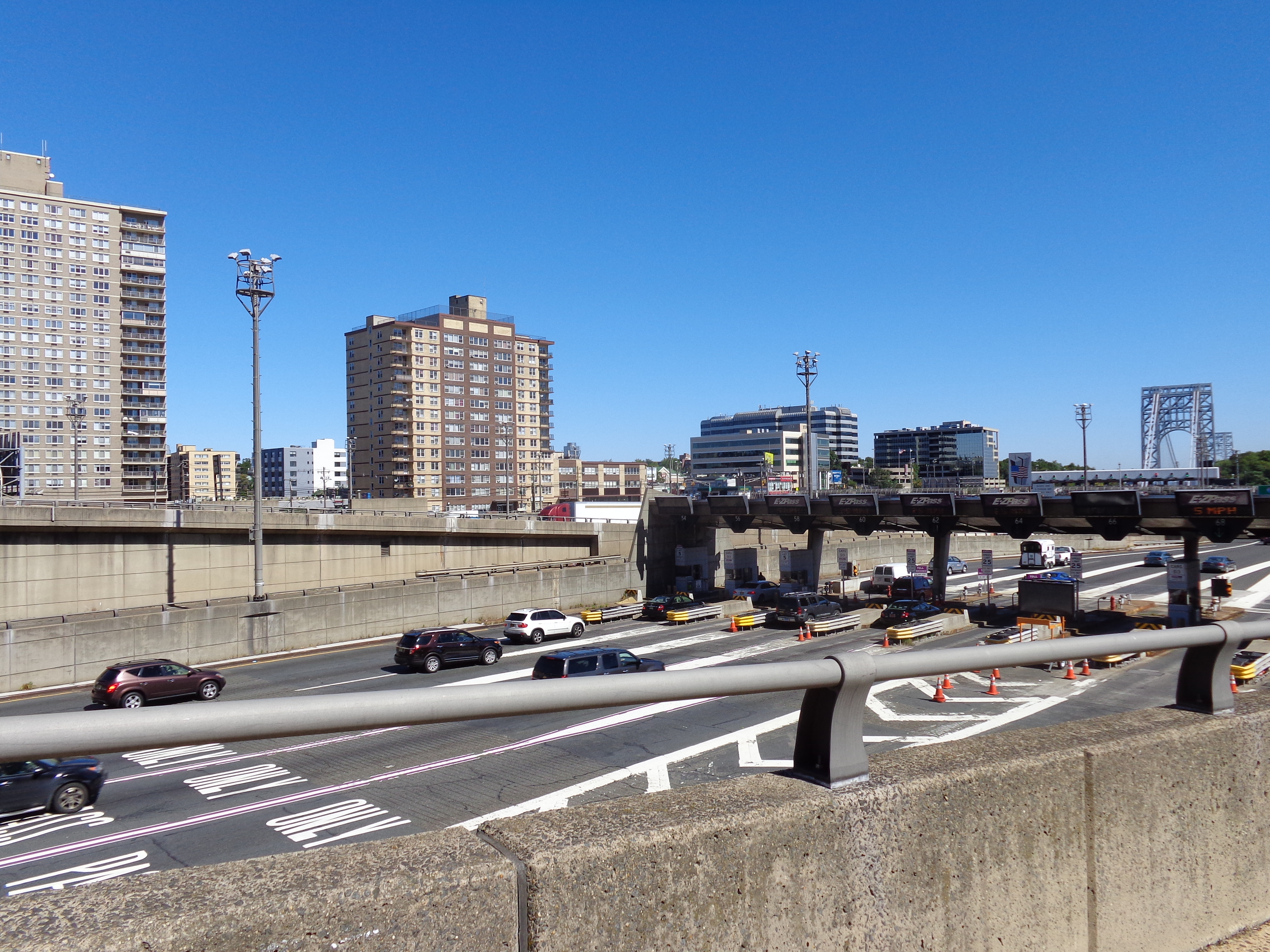
Looking northeast over highways to GWB

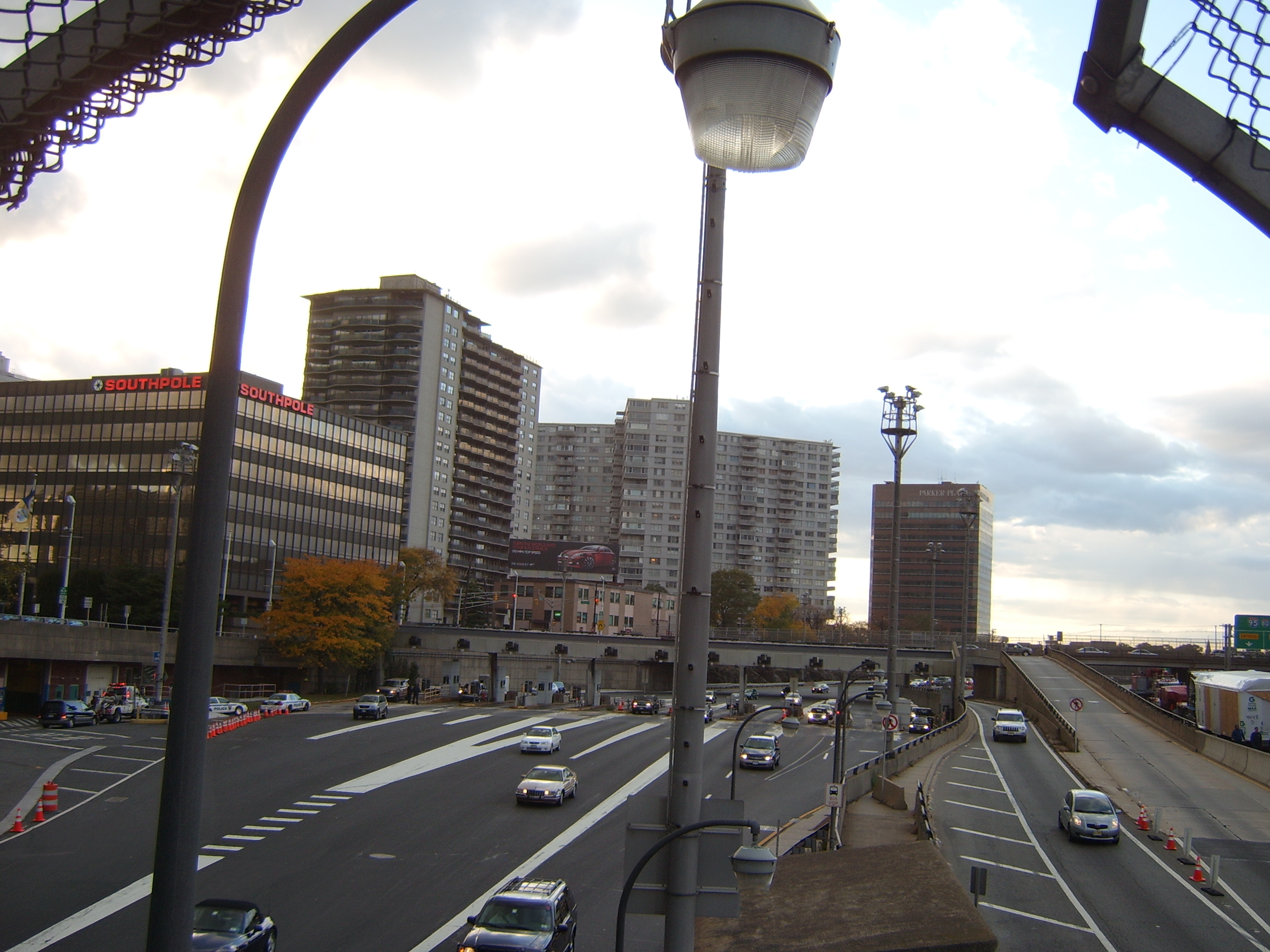
A view of the district looking west

The George Washington Bridge Plaza, also known as GWB Plaza or Bridge Plaza, is the convergence of roads and highways around the site of the George Washington Bridge toll plaza in Fort Lee, New Jersey, United States. The plaza is located north of and parallel to Fort Lee's Main Street. The surrounding busy area is characterized by a mix of commercial and residential uses and an architectural variety that includes parking lots, strip malls, houses, gas stations, mid-rise office buildings and high-rise condominiums. Just to the east is Fort Lee Historic Park, Palisades Interstate Park and the bridge's western tower.

== Roadways ==
The series of streets overlooks the lower vehicular cut through the Hudson Palisades where several major roads converge for the toll plazas for the Hudson River crossing. The four streets that bridge the cut are, from west to east, Fletcher Avenue (U.S. Route 9W), Linwood Avenue, Center Avenue, and Lemoine Avenue (New Jersey Route 67). Through the cut runs Interstate 95 which also carries the designations of U.S. Route 1/9 and U.S. Route 46. The legal terminus of the New Jersey Turnpike is at the Fletcher Avenue overpass.

The cut and I-95 are flanked by service roads. On the southern end, Bruce Reynolds Boulevard (also known as Bridge Plaza South) carries eastbound traffic from Fletcher Avenue and I-95's exit 73 off-ramp to Center Avenue and two-way traffic from there east to Hudson Terrace. It also provides access to and from both the northbound upper and lower level roadways of I-95 via exit 74. The northern service road, Bridge Plaza North, carries two-way traffic from Central Road to Center Avenue and westbound traffic from there west to Fletcher Avenue and a westbound on-ramp to New Jersey Route 4.

Northbound I-95 can access Bruce Reynolds Boulevard via exit 73 by way of Route 4 or the lower level roadway or exit 73 from the upper and lower level roadways. Southbound I-95 can access Bridge Plaza North via exit 73 on the upper and lower level roadways.

The expressway roads and their local street entrances/exits at Bridge Plaza under the jurisdiction of the Port Authority of New York and New Jersey, which also manages the bridge itself.

New Jersey Route 4, Bergen Boulevard (U.S. Route 46), and the Palisades Interstate Parkway are roads that originate in the immediate vicinity of Bridge Plaza.

Further west, other connections to the plaza via I-95 are Interstate 80, intersecting in Teaneck, and numerous state and county routes via U.S. 46 in Ridgefield.

== Transit hub ==
Bridge Plaza is a busy transit hub served by several bus lines, though there is no centralized bus station or stop. Routes operated by NJ Transit primarily connect Bergen, Hudson, and Passaic counties with Manhattan, while Rockland Coaches connect Bergen and Rockland counties with Manhattan. mostly terminating at the George Washington Bridge Bus Station or Port Authority Bus Terminal.

Spanish Transportation is one of many companies providing dollar van service at Bridge Plaza, primarily serving Paterson via New Jersey Route 4 and the Newport Mall via Bergenline and Anderson Avenues.

Columbia Transportation serves Fort Lee with the Fort Lee Shuttle service for students and employees, which runs from Parker Plaza (Lewis St) to Columbia University Medical Center in Manhattan. The Lamont Shuttle to/from Lamont Doherty Earth Observatory has some trips that stop at Parker Plaza.

=== NJ Transit ===
- 156: Englewood Cliffs to Port Authority Bus Terminal via Sylvan Avenue and Bergenline Avenue or River Road
- 158: Fort Lee to Port Authority Bus Terminal via River Road and Port Imperial Boulevard
- 159: Fort Lee to Port Authority Bus Terminal via Bergenline Avenue
- 171: Paterson Broadway Bus Terminal to GWB Bus Station via Route 4
- 175: Ridgewood to GWB Bus Station via Route 4
- 178: Hackensack Bus Terminal to GWB Bus Station
- 181: Bergenline Avenue Station to GWB Bus Station via Palisade and Bergenline Avenues
- 182: Hackensack Bus Terminal to GWB Bus Station
- 186: Dumont to GWB Bus Station via Lemoine and Sylvan Avenues
- 188: West New York to GWB Bus Station via Kennedy Boulevard
- 756: Bergen Community College to Englewood Cliffs via Lemoine & Sylvan Avenues and Route 4

=== Rockland Coaches ===
- 9, 9A, 9T, 9AT: GWB Bus Station to New City or Stony Point via U.S. Route 9W and Nyack

== Bridgegate ==
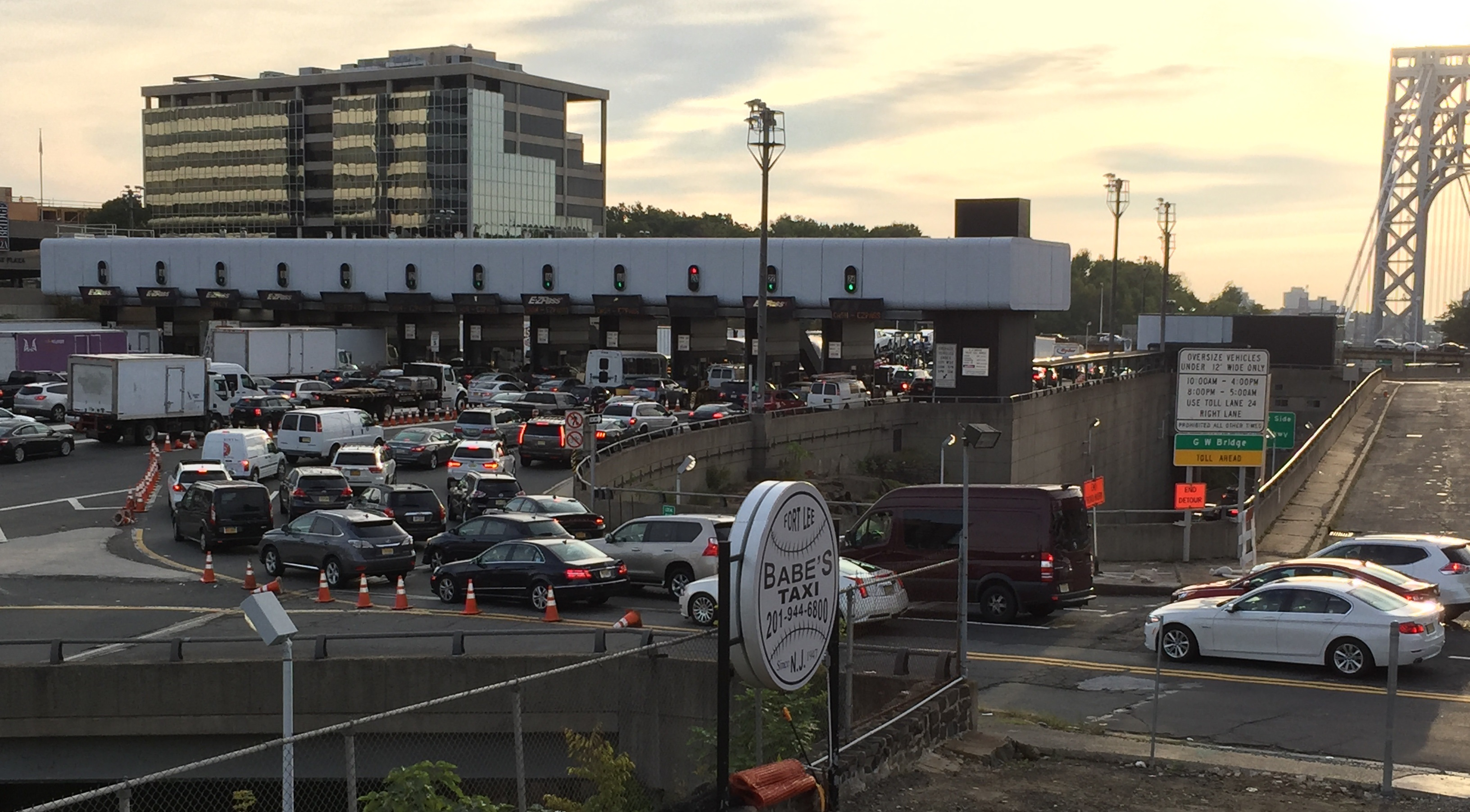
"Bridgegate" entrance, customary three rush-hour toll lanes (20, 22, 24)

The Fort Lee lane closure scandal, also known as Bridgegate, was a political scandal involving a staff member and political appointees of New Jersey Governor Chris Christie colluded to create traffic jams by closing entrance lanes to the bridge.

== See also ==
- List of tallest buildings in Fort Lee
- George Washington Bridge Bus Station (at the eastern terminus of the bridge in Manhattan)
- New Jersey Route 495, a similar highway built through a cut to access the Lincoln Tunnel
