= Port Authority Bus Terminal =

Bus station in Manhattan, New York

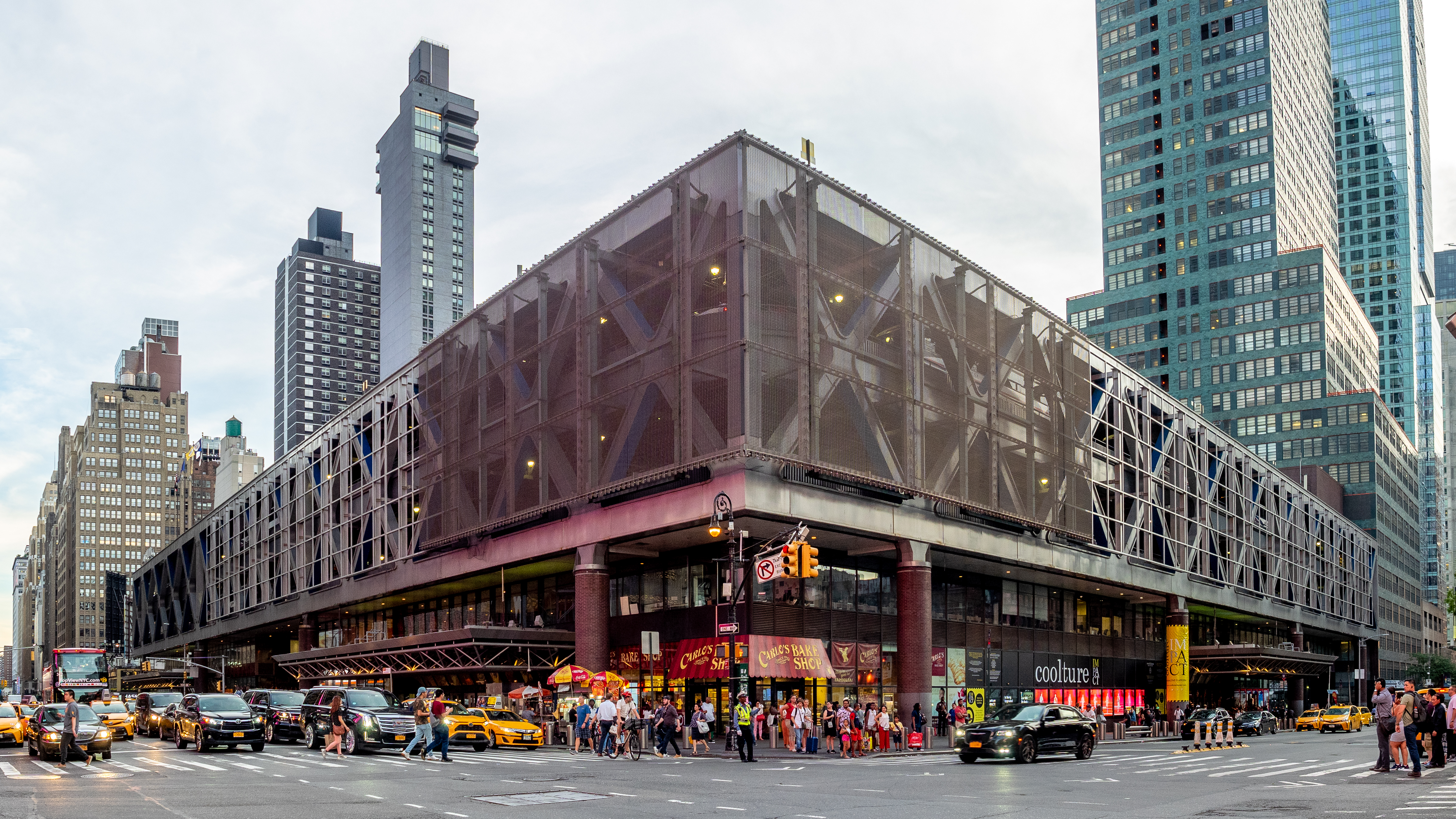
- Port Authority Bus Terminal at Eighth Avenue and West 42nd Street in July 2019

General information
- Location: 625 8th Avenue; New York City, New York; United States
- Coordinates: 40°45′24″N 73°59′28″W
- Owner: Port Authority of New York and New Jersey
- Bus routes: New Jersey Transit Bus: 101, 102, 105, 107, 108, 109, 111, 112, 113, 114, 115, 116, 117, 119, 121, 122, 123, 124, 125, 126, 127, 128, 129, 130, 131, 132, 133, 135, 136, 137, 138, 139, 144, 145, 148, 151, 153, 154, 155, 156, 157, 158, 159, 160, 161, 162, 163, 164, 165, 166, 167, 168, 177, 190, 191, 192, 193, 194, 195, 196, 197, 198, 199, 319, 320, 321, 324, 355
- Bus stands: 223
- Bus operators: See Companies below
- Connections: New York City Subway: at 42nd Street–Port Authority Bus Terminal at Times Square–42nd Street New York City Bus: M11, M20, M34A SBS, M42, M104, SIM8, SIM8X, SIM22, SIM25, SIM26, SIM30

Construction
- Platform levels: 9
- Parking: 1,250 spaces

Other information
- Website: PABT

History
- Opened: December 15, 1950
- Rebuilt: 1963 (parking decks); 1979 (annex); 2007 (seismic retrofit)
Location

The Port Authority Bus Terminal (colloquially known as the Port Authority and by its acronym PABT) is a bus terminal located in Manhattan in New York City. It is the busiest bus terminal in the world by volume of traffic, serving about 8,000 buses and 225,000 people on an average weekday and more than 65 million people a year.

The terminal is located in Midtown Manhattan at 625 Eighth Avenue between 40th Street and 42nd Street, one block east of the Lincoln Tunnel and one block west of Times Square. It is one of three bus terminals operated by the Port Authority of New York and New Jersey (PANYNJ); the other two are George Washington Bridge Bus Station in Upper Manhattan and Journal Square Transportation Center in Jersey City.

PABT serves as a terminus and departure point for commuter routes as well as for long-distance intercity bus service and is a major transit hub for residents of New Jersey. It has 223 departure gates and 1,250 car parking spaces, as well as commercial and retail space. In 2011, there were more than 2.263 million bus departures from the terminal.

Opened in 1950, the terminal was built to consolidate several private terminals spread across Midtown Manhattan. A second wing, extending to 42nd Street, was added in 1979. Since then, the terminal has reached peak hour capacity, leading to congestion and overflow on local streets. It does not allow for layover parking; as such, buses must either use local streets and parking lots or deadhead through the tunnel. PANYNJ has been unsuccessful in its attempts to expand passenger facilities through public private partnership, and in 2011 it delayed construction of a bus depot annex, citing budgetary constraints. After considering several plans to relocate the terminal, the PANYNJ released plans in 2021 to reconstruct the terminal on the same site, with layover facilities.

== History ==
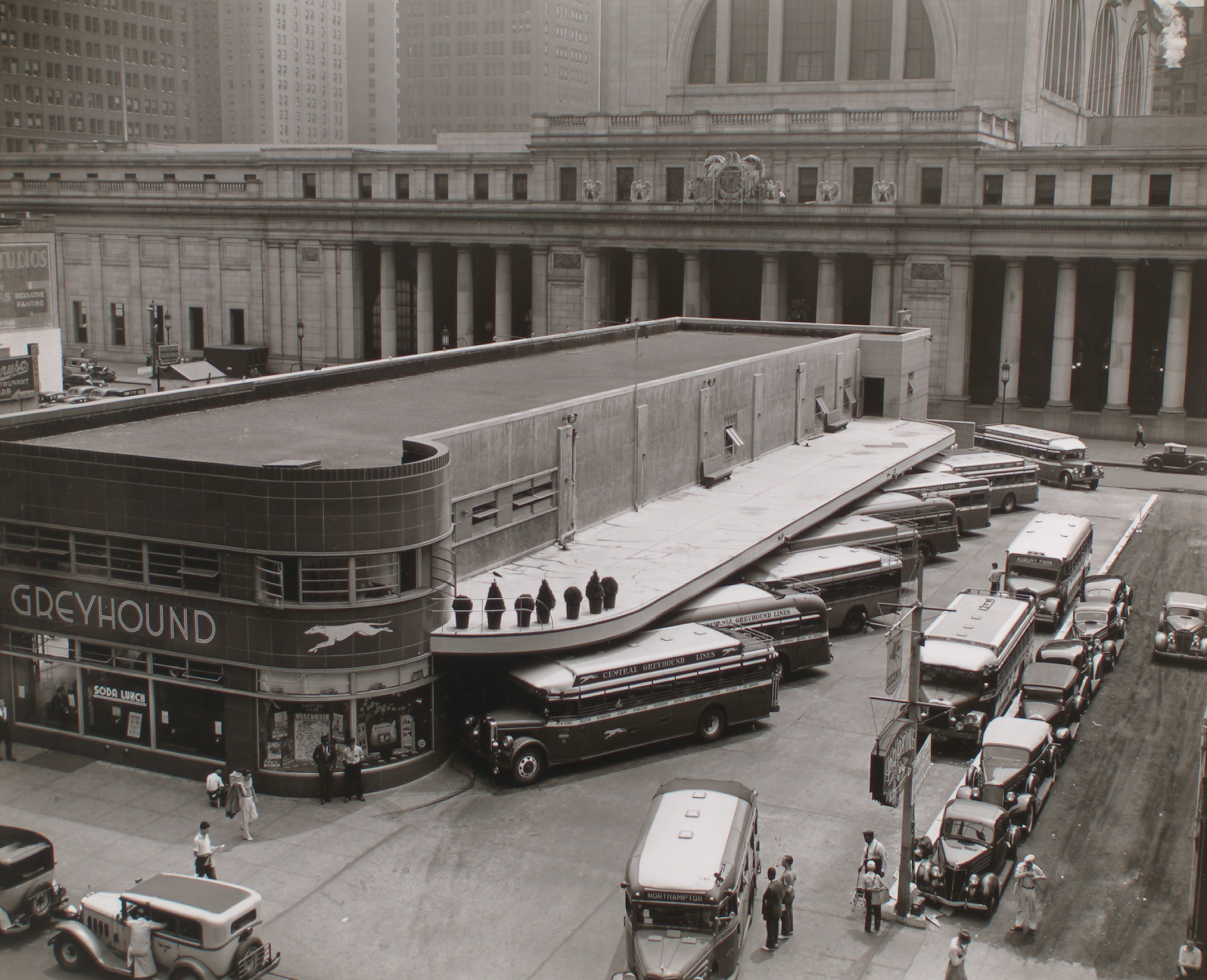
The last of many bus terminals in Midtown, at Old Penn Station. In 1963, Greyhound Lines became the last company to move to PABT.

Before PABT was constructed, there were several terminals scattered throughout Midtown Manhattan, some of which were part of hotels. The Federal Writers' Project's 1940 publication of New York: A Guide to the Empire State lists the All American Bus Depot on West 42nd, the Consolidated Bus Terminal on West 41st, and the Hotel Astor Bus Terminal on West 45th. The Dixie Bus Center on 42nd Street, located on the ground floor of the Dixie Hotel, opened in 1930 and operated until 1959.

The Baltimore and Ohio Railroad had coach service aboard a ferry to Communipaw Terminal in Jersey City that ran from an elegant bus terminal with a revolving bus platform in the Chanin Building at 42nd and Lexington. Greyhound Lines had its own facility adjacent to Pennsylvania Station and did not move into the Port Authority Bus Terminal until May 1963, at which time all long-distance bus service to the city was consolidated at the terminal.

=== Development ===
==== Planning ====
The Lincoln Tunnel between Manhattan and New Jersey opened in 1937. Within a year and a half of the tunnel's opening, five companies were operating 600 interstate bus trips through the tunnel every day. The city opposed letting buses go through Midtown Manhattan because they caused congestion. A large bus terminal near the mouth of the Lincoln Tunnel was first mandated in December 1939, after the city announced that it would ban commuter buses from driving into congested parts of Midtown. The ban was supposed to go into effect in January 1941, but New York Supreme Court Justice John E. McGeehan blocked La Guardia's proposed bus ban on the grounds that it was unreasonable.

In July 1940, at the request of New York City mayor Fiorello H. La Guardia, the Port of New York Authority started conducting a survey into the causes and effects of intercity and commuter bus traffic in Manhattan. That December, Times Square Terminal Inc. filed an application to build and operate a commuter bus terminal from 41st to 42nd Streets between Eighth and Ninth Avenues, adjacent to the McGraw-Hill Building on land owned by the McGraw-Hill Publishing Company. According to projections at the time, the $4 million terminal could be completed within nine months. Manhattan Borough President Stanley M. Isaacs proposed building a short $600,000 tube between the Lincoln Tunnel and the new terminal. The city approved the construction of the new terminal and connecting tunnel in January 1941.

Plans for a bus terminal were delayed because of World War II, which diverted resources from most projects that were not directly involved in the war effort. In June 1944, the New York state government allocated $180,000 to the Port of New York Authority for studying the feasibility of constructing a bus terminal in Midtown Manhattan. Early the next year, plans for a mid-Manhattan bus terminal were presented to the different bus companies. While most major bus lines agreed to the plan, Greyhound was already planning on expanding its then terminal near Penn Station. Greyhound initially opposed the terminal but withdrew its opposition in late 1947.

==== Construction ====
The New York City Board of Estimate approved the construction of the new terminal in January 1947. The terminal was to be built one block south of the aborted Times Square Terminal Inc. site, on the block bounded by 40th and 41st Streets and Eighth and Ninth Avenues. The Port of New York Authority began acquiring land for the terminal two months later. To finance the terminal's construction, the agency issued $16.3 million in bonds in July 1947. Plans for the structural design were revised substantially in March 1948, when the Port of New York Authority added a 500-spot parking lot on the terminal's roof, to be accessed via a series of ramps. The last industrial tenant on the future terminal's site moved away the following month, and the agency began relocating the first of 450 displaced families in November 1948.

Walter McQuade designed the terminal, with Vincent Marchesani as the assistant architect. The Port of New York Authority hosted a groundbreaking ceremony for the terminal on January 27, 1949, at which point half of the site had been cleared. At the same time, the agency began soliciting bids from concessionaires for the terminal's 50 stores. By the middle of the year, the agency had received 500 bids from concessionaires. The first steel beams for the new bus terminal were installed in November 1949, and Turner Construction received a contract the next month to build the terminal's superstructure for approximately $9.2 million. The steel framework for the new terminal topped out during March 1950. The terminal's construction was delayed slightly by a labor strike in the middle of that year. Despite this, the terminal was substantially complete by November 1, 1950. The project had employed 1,055 men and used 1.53 million bricks and 1.22 million square feet (113,000 m^{2}) of concrete.

=== Original terminal ===
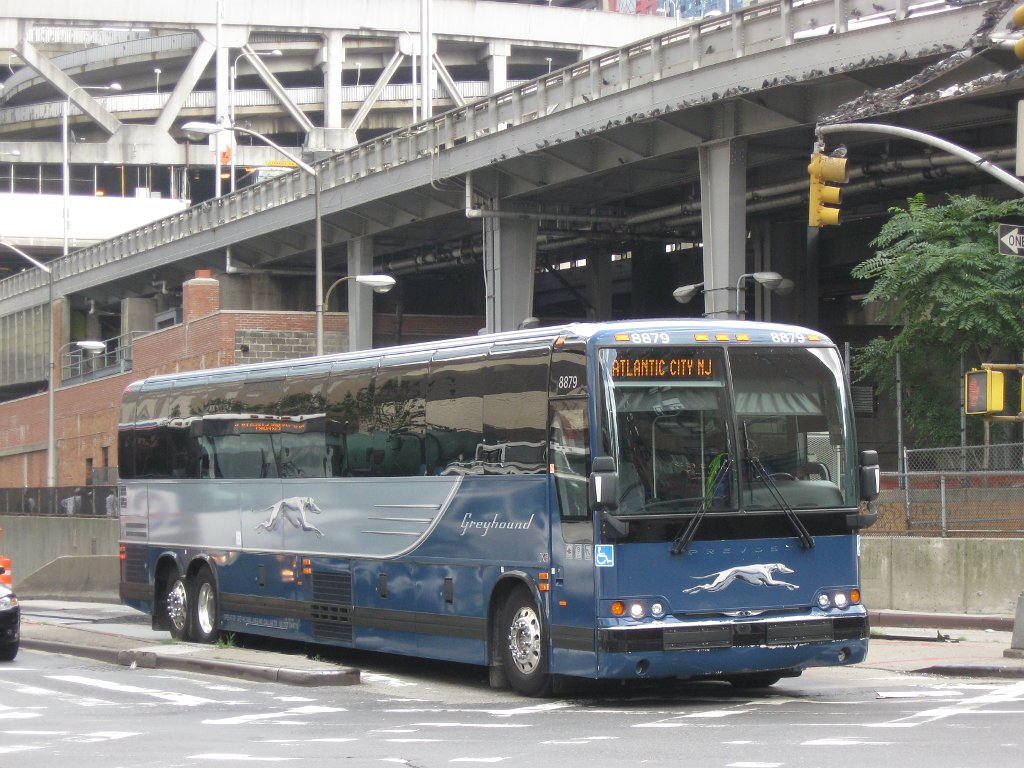
There are ramps to the Lincoln Tunnel, while the lower level of the North Wing connects with a tunnel under Ninth Avenue.

The original Mid-Manhattan Bus Terminal (now PABT's South Wing), built in the International Style, was opened on December 15, 1950. The four-story terminal measured 200 by 800 feet (61 by 244 m) and was 65 feet (20 m) tall, with a 500-space parking lot and 50 stores. The ground level contained 40 slips for long-haul buses, as well as an auxiliary platform with space for 15 more buses. The second level was the main concourse and contained ticket offices, waiting rooms, baggage check, restaurants, shops, a 300-seat newsreel theater, and escalators to other levels. The third story was the suburban concourse, which was divided into three sections and contained 72 loading slips and 15 unloading slips. The fourth story was for short-haul buses. A system of pipes was embedded into the reinforced-concrete ramps leading to the terminal, keeping the ramps free of ice. The Port of New York Authority had also proposed a heliport on the roof during the terminal's construction, and the agency had authorized the construction of a ramp to the 42nd Street and Eighth Avenue subway station just before the terminal opened.

During its first year, the Port Authority Bus Terminal accommodated 40 million passengers; the terminal's construction was credited with diverting 5,000 buses per day from street-level bus stops. The terminal had replaced a series of coffee shops frequented by the elderly; after the coffee shops had been demolished, patrons of these establishments began meeting at the terminal instead. The terminal's rooftop garage was initially mostly empty, prompting the garage's operators to allow trucks to park there. By mid-1951, the garage was frequently fully occupied and was profitable. In the terminal's early years, the Port of New York Authority constantly cleaned the terminal, scrubbing the floor every night. Despite the large numbers of passengers who used the terminal, it recorded a net loss during its first five years, in part due to high operating expenses, debt charges, and interest costs.

=== Expansions and modifications ===
==== First expansion ====
In September 1959, the Port of New York Authority announced that it would spend $19 million to increase the bus terminal's capacity by 50 percent. The plans involved converting the existing parking lot atop the building with 25 spaces for long-haul buses and 32 spaces for short-haul buses. In addition, a 1,000-space parking lot would be built above the existing roof. That December, the Port of New York Authority approved $24 million for the expansion of the terminal and for the widening of several ramps leading from the terminal to the Lincoln Tunnel. Construction of the expansion took place during off-peak hours to minimize disruptions to bus service. As part of an experiment in 1960, the Port of New York Authority installed a canopy above one of the loading slips to shield commuters from buses' emissions. The first of 30 "legs" supporting the new parking lot were installed in November 1960, and the existing parking lot was closed the following March.

The expansion topped out in June 1961, and a bridge connecting the expanded terminal with the Lincoln Tunnel was installed two months later. The Port of New York Authority sold $25 million in bonds for the expansions of the Port Authority Bus Terminal and George Washington Bridge in January 1962. The new ramps to the Lincoln Tunnel were finished the next month. The first 300 spaces in the new parking lot opened in April 1962, and the rest of the parking lot was opened in stages over the next two months. The new loading slips were opened in several stages and were in full operation by April 1963.

==== Decline ====
As early as the mid-1960s, the Port Authority Bus Terminal had gained a reputation as a "derelict's haven", especially at night, when dozens of homeless persons slept in the terminal. Following a New York Times report about the large homeless populations in the terminal, the PANYNJ began stationing additional officers there in January 1967 to deter homeless people from sleeping there. The PANYNJ also added a CCTV system in 1966 in an attempt to reduce crime. The New York Times reported in 1969 that hustlers frequently harassed the terminal's passengers; at the time, the Port Authority Police Department arrested 130 people per month.

By the early 1970s, the PANYNJ had redecorated some of the terminal's spaces, adding glass enclosures and rubber trees in an attempt to discourage loiterers. The PANYNJ also built a coffeehouse in late 1971 for elderly residents of the area who frequented the terminal, and the New York City Taxi and Limousine Commission installed a taxi-dispatch system at the terminal in 1972. Meanwhile, the terminal still accommodated an average of 250,000 passengers daily by 1975, even as the number of buses traveling to the terminal had started to decline in 1968. Hustlers, pimps, prostitutes, drug dealers, muggers, panhandlers, sexual predators and the homeless still frequented the terminal, which also attracted runaway youth from other cities. The Port Authority Bus Terminal also recorded hundreds of crimes every year by the late 1970s; this was attributed in part to the "lonely and derelict" in the neighborhood.

In March 1975, a federal judge ruled that the PANYNJ "was not competent to" allocate loading space to the bus companies that used the terminal, since the agency had never properly studied traffic patterns at the terminal. The PANYNJ subsequently conducted a study of the terminal's traffic, finding that the terminal handled between 750 and 800 buses during a typical morning, which carried a total of 35,000 passengers. The Interstate Commerce Commission began investigating overcrowding at the terminal that March after receiving numerous commuter complaints that the PANYNJ and bus operators had "failed to provide safe and adequate service". After the PANYNJ announced the next month that it would build an annex north of the original terminal, the ICC canceled a public hearing for its overcrowding investigation. One of the operators using the terminal, Trailways, began a rent strike in 1977, complaining that the terminal was dilapidated and that rent at the terminal was far too high. Trailways quickly ended its rent strike under threat of eviction, but the company criticized the terminal's safety after two people were killed there in mid-1978.

==== Northern annex ====
Private developer Irving Maidman had proposed erecting a second bus terminal just north of the existing terminal in 1956. The PANYNJ first considered expanding the bus station northward to 42nd Street as early as January 1965; the New York City Planning Commission endorsed the plan, which was not carried out at that time. The PANYNJ announced plans in 1970 to expand its terminal northward and build an office tower above the north annex. The annex would have cost $80 million, while the skyscraper above it would have cost $50 million. PANYNJ officials hoped the new annex would alleviate traffic on Eighth Avenue, which was frequently congested because of double-parking taxis. Plans for the annex were delayed for several years because of disputes between the PANYNJ and the bus companies using the terminal. The PANYNJ claimed that the bus companies had refused to pay higher fees, but unnamed sources affiliated with the bus companies said the construction of the World Trade Center had used up the agency's money.

The expansion was delayed until May 1975, when PANYNJ chairman William J. Ronan announced that the expansion would begin that September at a cost of $137.5 million. The project was to involve the replacement of the original terminal's curved facade with a glass curtain wall; the construction of a new wing with four above-ground concourses and one basement; improved access to the subway; and a tunnel connecting with the Lincoln Tunnel. The project also included replacing existing escalators. To raise money for the annex, the PANYNJ raised tolls by 50 percent on six bridges and tunnels that it operated between New York and New Jersey. That August, the PANYNJ allocated another $22 million for the terminal's renovation. The additional funds were earmarked for renovating the main concourse, erecting glass enclosures around 24 platforms, adding entrances on Ninth Avenue, refurbishing the restrooms, and replacing the air-conditioning system.

Although bus traffic continued to decline during the late 1970s, the PANYNJ still wished to build the annex to alleviate congestion at the existing terminal. The facility handled 7,000 buses per day in 1977; as such, during rush hours, buses had seven minutes to unload and load all passengers. The North Wing was opened in 1979. This expansion increased capacity by 50 percent and included a new facade comprising 27 steel X-shaped trusses. Assessing the facade design in 2008, Virtualtourist listed the terminal as one of the "World's Top 10 Ugliest Buildings and Monuments". The northern annex included 50 loading slips, with space for another 25 slips, as well as a 15-foot-wide (4.6 m) arcade recessed from the 42nd Street and Eighth Avenue facades.

==== Later years ====
In the late 1970s and early 1980s, the public considered the area around Times Square, including PABT, to be dangerous. In an attempt to alleviate fears of crime, the PANYNJ turned on some lights that had been switched off to save energy; cleaned the city-maintained sidewalk outside the terminal; and created designated zones for hustlers and advocacy groups. Crime increased after the north wing was completed, with 2,800 crimes being reported in 1979 and 3,300 crimes in 1983.

During 1997, the terminal was the subject of a study, coordinated by Professor Marcus Felson of Rutgers University, which identified strategic changes to the building's design and area supervision with a view to reducing crime and other problems. In 2007, the South Wing underwent a seismic retrofit in a $52 million building code-compliance project to reinforce and stabilize it against earthquakes. In addition, architecture firm PKSB Architects was hired in 1995 to design a titanium facade, a canopy above the entrance, and stainless steel cladding around the terminal's ramps and bridges. That project was completed in 2008.

On September 11, 2001, the terminal closed and service was suspended, as all motor vehicle traffic into and out of Manhattan was shut down after the attacks. Partial service resumed on September 13 at 5:00 a.m., two hours after the reopening of the terminal's primary access route, the Lincoln Tunnel. The terminal, and intercity bus routes traveling through it, became an alternative method of transportation for stranded travelers whose flights had been canceled during the nationwide ground stop.

=== Further expansion proposals ===
==== Air rights ====
The PANYNJ has attempted to further expand the terminal through public–private partnerships by leasing air rights over the North Wing. In 1999, a 35-story building, to be known as 7 Times Square, (Note: That address is now used by Times Square Tower.) was proposed to be constructed over the North Wing and a golf driving range was to be constructed over the South Wing. However, the project was put on hold in 2001 due to a decline in the economy following the dot com bust.

Between 2000 and 2011, the PANYNJ worked with Vornado Realty Trust, which had partnered with the Lawrence Ruben Company. Plans for the tower were revived in April 2007. That November, the PANYNJ announced the terms of an agreement in which it would receive nearly $500 million in a lease arrangement for a new office tower that would also provide funds for additional terminal facilities. The new tower would include 1.3 million square feet (120,000 m^{2}) of commercial space in a new office tower, which was to use the vanity address 20 Times Square, the addition of 60,000 square feet (5,600 m^{2}) of new retail space in the bus terminal, as well as 18 additional departure gates, accommodating 70 additional buses carrying up to 3,000 passengers per hour. New escalators would be installed to help move passengers more quickly between the gate area and the ground floor. Construction was expected to begin in 2009 or 2010, and take four years to complete. After an architectural competition, the PANYNJ selected the design by Pritzker Prize-winning architect Richard Rogers from Rogers Stirk Harbour + Partners for a 45-story office tower with an overall height of 855 feet (261 m). The agreement expired in August 2009, and in May 2010, Vornado was given a retroactive extension on the deadline to August 2011. In July 2011, Vornado announced they had found a new partner to partially finance the tower, but in November 2011, the new backers pulled out of the project.

In June 2014, the PANYNJ received a higher price than anticipated for the sale of nearby property, $115 million versus $100 million. The value of air rights above the terminal would be higher than previously appraised, thanks to rising property values in the area surrounding the terminal and an indication of the rising value air rights above the terminal. The agency had intentions to release a request for proposals for air-rights development in 2014–2015.

==== West Side bus depot ====
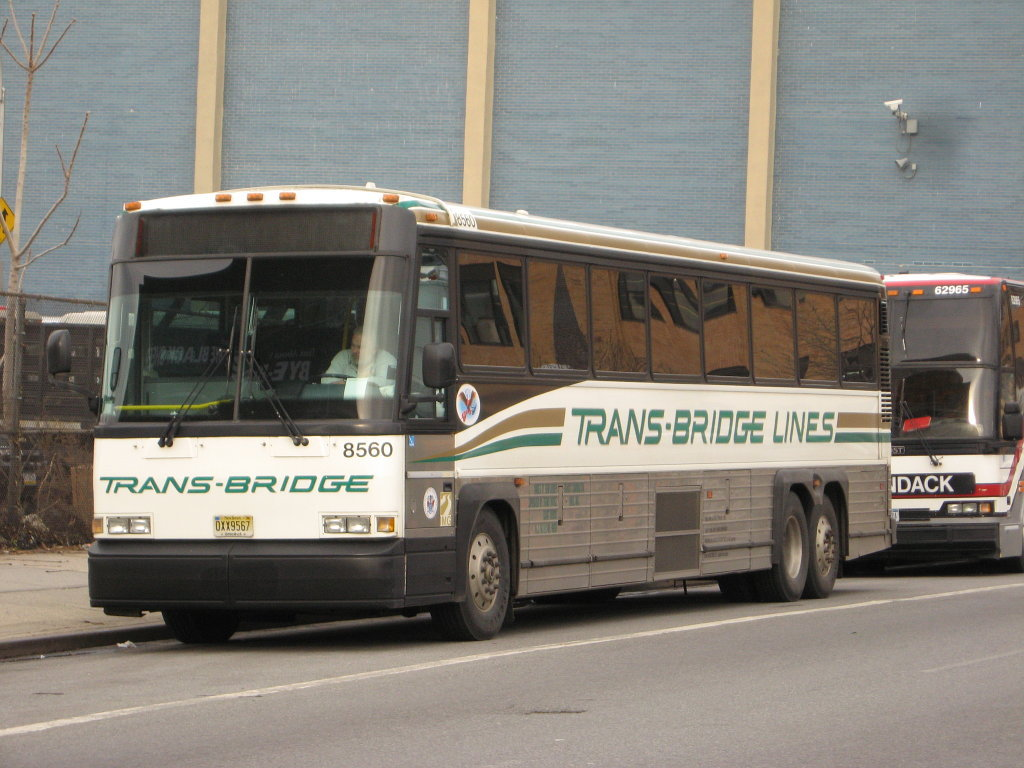
Many buses lay over on city streets or make non-passenger bus trips through the Lincoln Tunnel for daytime parking.

The Port Authority allows for limited layovers of buses, thus requiring companies to make other arrangements during off-peak hours and between trips. Many park on local streets or parking lots during the day, while others make a round-trip without passengers through the Lincoln Tunnel to use layover facilities in New Jersey. Bus layover parking on city streets is regulated by the NYDOT, which assigns locations throughout the city. In the vicinity of PABT, these are concentrated on the side streets between Ninth and Twelfth Avenues from 30th Street to 60th Street.

Various studies and news reports have concluded that there is a need for a new bus depot in Midtown. In a joint study by New York City and PANYNJ, it was determined that a preferred location for a bus depot was at Galvin Plaza located on 39th to 40th Streets between Tenth and Eleventh Avenues. However, this proposed location for commuter buses would not have capacity for charter buses and tour buses.

The PANYNJ announced considerable toll increases on its crossings between New York and New Jersey in August 2011, citing as one of their reasons the construction of an $800 million "new bus garage connected to the Port Authority Bus Terminal, which will serve as a traffic reliever to the Lincoln Tunnel and midtown Manhattan streets, saving two-thirds of the empty bus trips that must make two extra trips through the tunnel each day." Originally included in the PANYNJ 2007–2016 Capital Plan, construction of the garage was scrapped by the agency in October 2011, after it cited budgetary constraints due to an arrangement whereby the toll increases would be incrementally implemented.

In April 2012, the director of the PANYNJ reported that a proposal had been made by developer Larry Silverstein, who has a memorandum of understanding to develop a property at 39th Street and Dyer Avenue near the ramps between the tunnel and the terminal, to construct a bus garage with a residential tower above it. This parcel is not large enough to accommodate bus ramps and would require the use of elevators, which seemed to be a new type of application for bus storage. The proposal has not progressed any further.

In 2014, the PANYNJ made an application for a $230 million grant to the Federal Transit Administration for development of the garage.

=== Replacement ===
In June 2013, the PANYNJ commissioned an 18-month study that was to consider reconfiguration, expansion, and replacement options for PABT and new bus staging and storage facilities on Manhattan's West Side. The $5.5 million contract awarded to Kohn Pedersen Fox and Parsons Brinckerhoff would look into potential public-private financing, including the sale of air rights and cost-sharing with private bus carriers.

In 2016, the PANYNJ invited a number of development teams to propose ideas for replacement of the existing bus terminal. Subsequently, in May 2019, the PANYNJ commenced the environmental review process for PABT's replacement. The PANYNJ planned to host four public hearings, two each in New York and New Jersey, in July and September 2019. Three plans were considered: building a new terminal on the site, building a new terminal elsewhere, or moving intercity buses elsewhere while renovations took place in the existing terminal. In anticipation of opportunities that reconstruction of the bus terminal will portend, the Hell's Kitchen South Coalition produced its own plan for the area.

In January 2021, the PANYNJ released plans for reconstructing the terminal on the same site, with expansion of bus layover facilities. The PANYNJ hired architects Boston-based Foster + Partners and Chicago-based design and engineering firm Epstein Global in August 2022 to design the new terminal, and $65 million was allocated to the project the next year. In January 2024, the Federal Transit Administration approved a draft environmental impact report for the replacement terminal. The PANYNJ announced revised plans for the terminal the same month, which called for 3.5 acres (1.4 ha) of parks, a glass atrium, and a main entrance on 41st Street. The plans also called for two office buildings of at least 60 stories on 40th and 42nd streets. Part of 41st Street from Eighth to Ninth avenues would be closed permanently, and there would be an additional building for bus storage and staging areas, At the time, the new terminal was planned to cost $10 billion; new ramps to the terminal were to be completed by 2028, while the terminal itself was planned to be finished by 2032.

The New York City Planning Commission approved the terminal-replacement plans in October 2024, and the plan received federal approval that December. In January 2025, the United States Department of Transportation disbursed a $1.89 billion grant for the Port Authority Bus Terminal's reconstruction. Work began on May 29, 2025, when a groundbreaking ceremony for a temporary terminal on Dyer Avenue between 37th and 39th streets was hosted. In October 2026, the PANYNJ began demolishing bus ramps to the old terminal as part of the new terminal's construction.

== Art and advertising ==
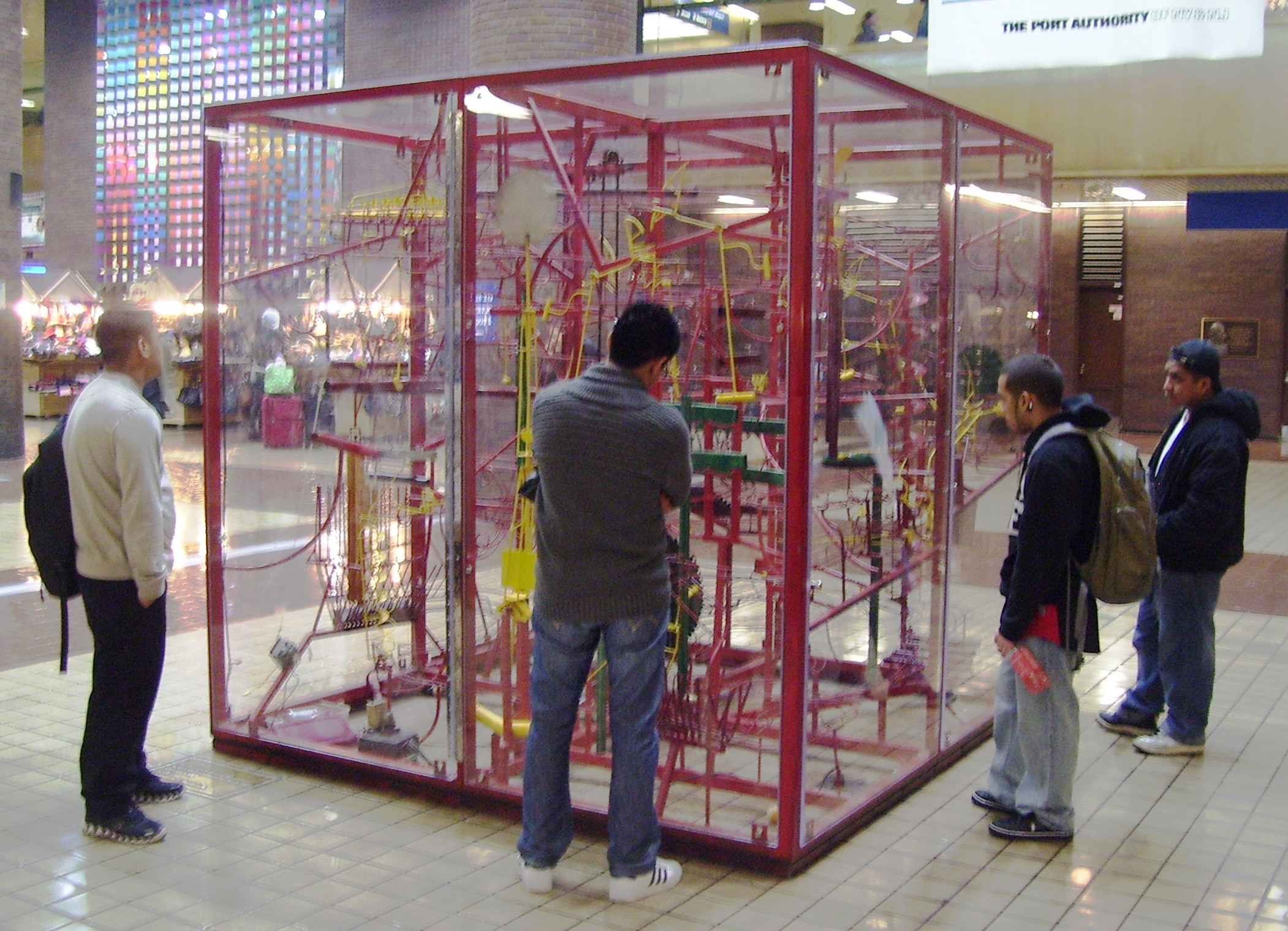
George Rhoads's 1983 rolling ball sculpture 42nd Street Ballroom in the terminal's north building

The Commuters, a sculpture of three weary bus passengers and a clock salvaged from the original terminal by George Segal, was unveiled in the main ticket area in 1982. 42nd Street Ballroom, a rolling ball sculpture by George Rhoads on the main floor of the North Wing, was installed in 1983. A statue of Jackie Gleason in the guise of one of his most famous characters, the bus driver Ralph Kramden, stands in front of the main entrance to the original South Wing. The plaque reads, "Jackie Gleason as Ralph Kramden - Bus Driver - Raccoon Lodge Treasurer - Dreamer - Presented by the People of TV Land".

Triple Bridge Gateway, completed in 2009, is an art installation by Leni Schwendinger Light Projects, underneath the ramps connecting the tunnel and the terminal; it is part of the transformation of the Ninth Avenue entrance of the South Wing.

In July 2011, PABT became home to the world's largest mediamesh, a stainless steel fabric embedded with light-emitting diodes (LEDs) for various types of media, art, and advertising imagery. The LED imagery façade covers 6,000 square feet (560 m^{2}), and wraps around the corner of 42nd Street and Eighth Avenue.

== Configuration ==
=== Information and ticketing ===
For many years there was no timetable board displaying departures at PABT; passengers were required to inquire at information booths or ticket counters for schedules and departure gates. In 2015, both the Port Authority and NJ Transit installed screens listing upcoming scheduled departures, though buses are not tracked so delays are not communicated via this method.

Tickets can be purchased on the main level (ground floor) of the South Wing at the main ticket plaza; Greyhound, Trailways and Short Line have additional ticket counters in the terminal.

New Jersey Transit (NJT) maintains a customer service counter at the terminal on the south wing main level (open weekdays). NJT has ticket vending machines (TVM) throughout the terminal. Effective in 2009, passengers boarding NJT buses are required to purchase a ticket before boarding. In April 2012, NJT began re-equipping machines that would give change for those paying cash with bills rather than $1 coins. NJT also accepts contactless payment systems (such as Apple Pay and Google Pay) at TVMs, NJT's mobile app, and ticket windows.

=== Gates ===
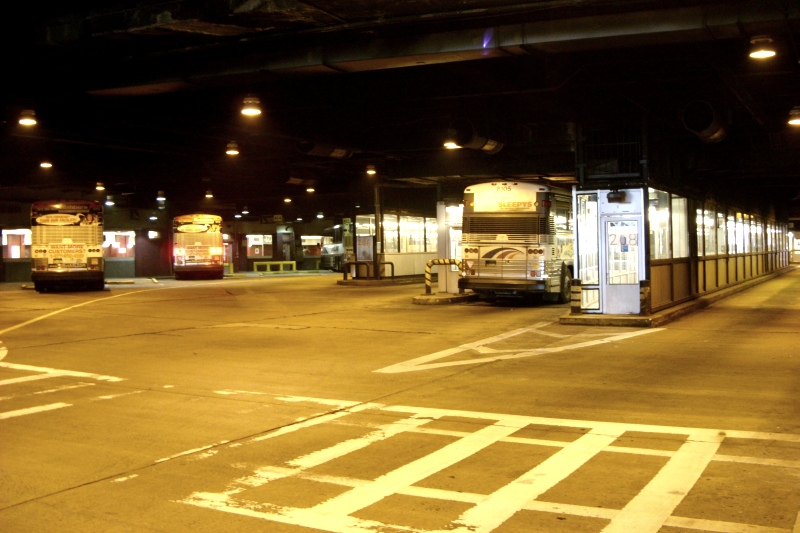
Escalators and stairs carry passengers to individually enclosed pull-through island platforms at departure gates numbered 200 and up.

There are 223 departure gates of either saw-tooth (pull-in) or island platform (pull-through) design at PABT. At the Subway Level, or lower level of both wings, Gates 1-85 are predominantly used for long-distance travel, including buses to Canada, and jitneys, and during overnight hours (1 a.m. to 6 a.m.) for commuter lines. From 6 a.m. to 1 a.m., during the hours of normal operation, Gates 200–425, numbered to indicate the different boarding areas (100, 200, 300, etc.) within the complex are accessible from the 2nd floor and serve short-haul commuter lines. The third and fourth floors are respectively known as the 300 and 400 levels. Most NJ Transit routes and New Jersey private carrier commuter routes are on the 200, 300, and 400 levels.

=== Retail and entertainment ===
Like other transit hubs, PABT has undergone a series of renovations to create a mall-like sphere to promote its retail, food, entertainment, and services spaces. There are numerous franchise stores, such as Heartland Brewery, Au Bon Pain, Jamba Juice, Starbucks, Hudson News, Duane Reade, GNC, plus a United States Postal Service branch station, as well as a variety of restaurants and bars throughout the terminal. Frames, a bowling alley (previously long known as Leisure Time Bowling) occupies a large space on the 2nd floor.

=== Restrooms ===
Men's and women's restrooms in the bus terminal have been the subject of media attention; the women's restroom on the second floor is the terminal's busiest. It acts as a makeup counter, frequented by crowds daily due to its lighting, large mirrors, and cleanliness, a noted contrast to the rest of the unpopular terminal.

The men's restrooms are the subject of an ongoing lawsuit against the Port Authority's police department. The lawsuit exposed a trend of plainclothes officers targeting homosexual or effeminate men at the bus terminal's restrooms. Five officers, of about 1,700 in the department, were responsible for 70 percent of public lewdness arrests in 2014, the year the lawsuit was filed. Most of the arrests have been for masturbation; the lawsuit alleged most of the arrests are targeted at LGBT men who have not performed any wrongful acts. The Port Authority Police Department ended the practice in 2022.

== Companies ==
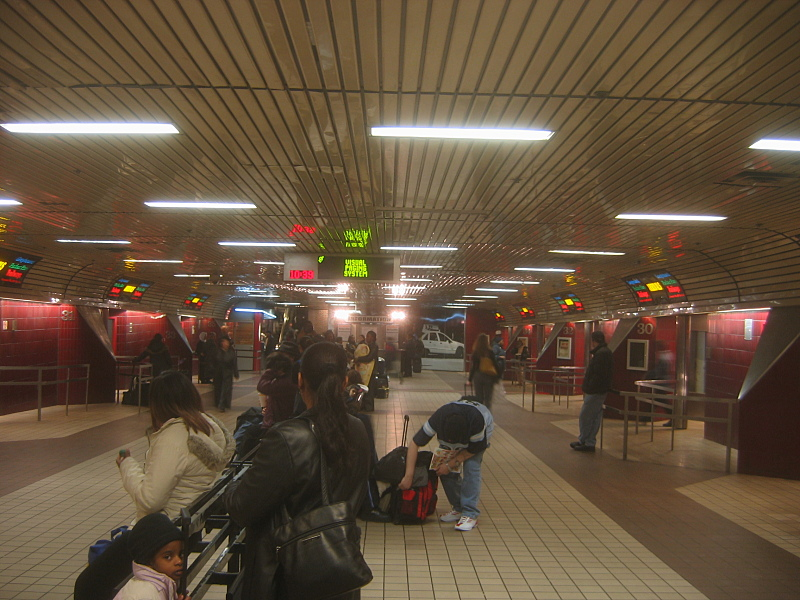
Gates 1-85 on the lower level of the terminal are used for inter-city departures.

The Port Authority Bus Terminal is served by the following lines:

=== Commuter lines ===
- Academy Bus
- Coach USA
  - Community Coach
  - Rockland Coaches
  - Short Line
  - Suburban Trails
- Community Lines
- Lakeland Bus Lines
- Martz Trailways
- New Jersey Transit (Routes 101-199) (Note: NJT bus operations make up 70 percent of the terminal's traffic. Approximately 79,000 NJT riders and another 30,000 commuters on private bus lines use the terminal each morning, arriving from New Jersey, Rockland County and Orange County in the Hudson Highlands and eastern Pennsylvania.)
- OurBus
- Spanish Transportation
- Trans-Bridge Lines

=== Airport buses ===
- Olympia Trails to Newark Airport

=== Intercity operators ===
- Adirondack Trailways
- C&J
- Coach Company (OurBus)
- Fullington Trailways
- Greyhound Lines
- OurBus Prime
- Peter Pan Bus Lines
- Short Line

=== Sightseeing ===
- Gray Line New York
- The RIDE, nearby on the north side of 42nd Street and Eighth Avenue

== Connecting transport ==
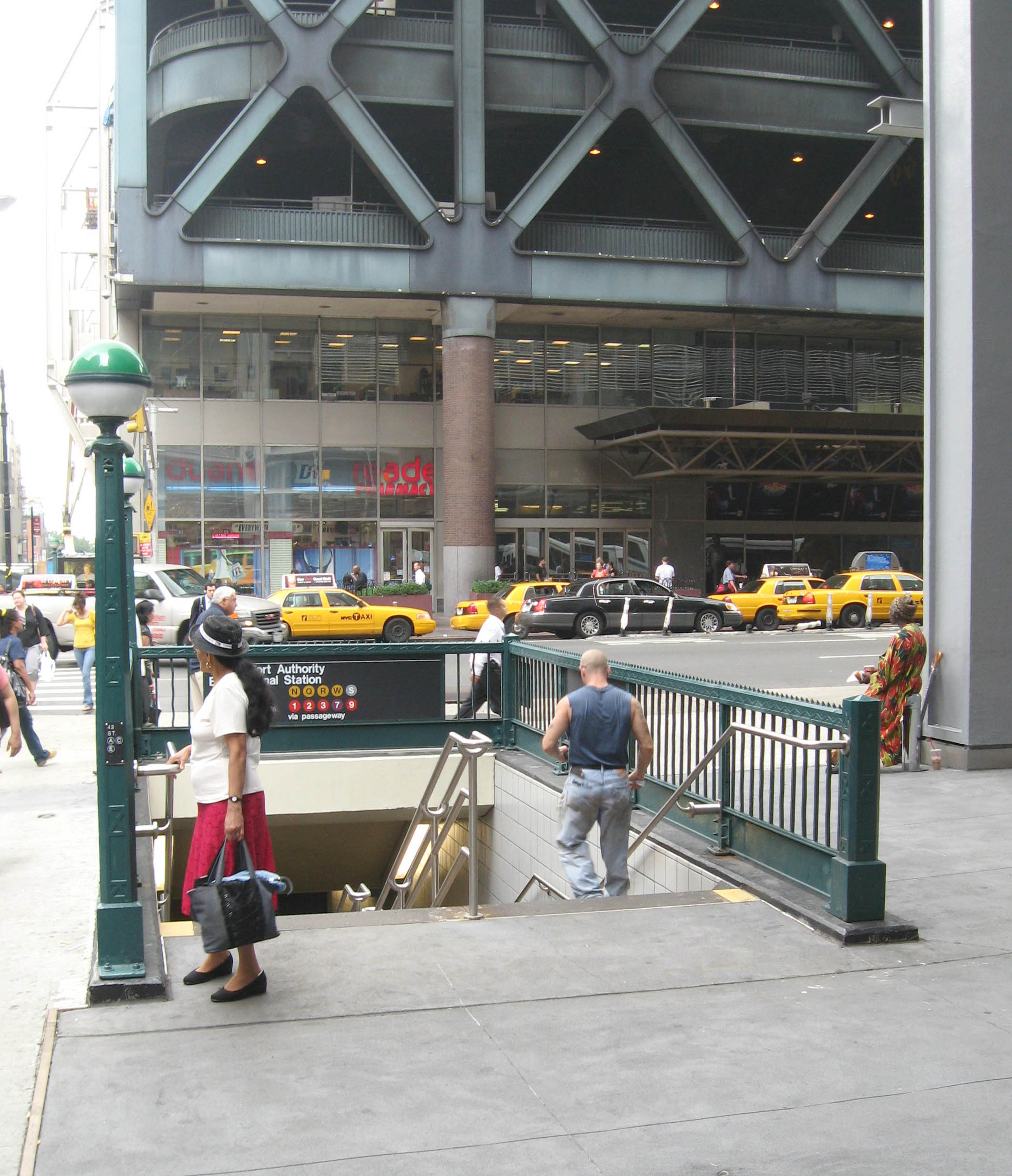
Subway entrance and cab stand on Eighth Avenue. Extensive underground passageways connect various stations and PABT.

Direct underground passageways connect the terminal with the 1, 2, 3, 7, <7>, A, C, E, N, Q, R, W, and S trains of the New York City Subway at the Times Square–42nd Street and 42nd Street–Port Authority Bus Terminal stations. Several bus routes operated by New York City Bus, including the M11, M20, M34A, M42 and M104 local buses and the SIM8, SIM22, SIM25, SIM26 and SIM30 Staten Island express buses, stop immediately outside the terminal. The terminal is also served by NY Waterway's 42nd Street shuttle to West Midtown Ferry Terminal.

In the last decade, numerous jitney routes serving Hudson and Passaic counties in northern New Jersey pick up passengers inside the bus terminal or on the street outside the terminal. Dollar vans operated by Spanish Transportation to Paterson and Community Lines jitneys to Journal Square use platforms on the lower level. Routes to Bergenline Avenue/GWB Plaza, and Boulevard East depart from 42nd Street outside the bus terminal's North Wing.

In 2011, a controversy arose when Megabus, a long-distance carrier using double-decker buses, with the permission of the New York City Department of Transportation, began to use the streets and sidewalk at the terminal. The director of the PANYNJ, citing safety, as well as other long-haul companies (which paid rent to use the terminal) citing unfair competitive advantage, were opposed to the permission to allow the company use of 41st Street directly beneath the connection between the two wings of the Port Authority. Despite these concerns and complaints, Megabus was initially permitted to stay. However, the permission was withdrawn later that year. Megabus now largely uses street-side stops near the Javits Center (for pickup) and Penn Station (for drop-off), except for a limited number of routes which use PABT.

== Capacity and overflow ==
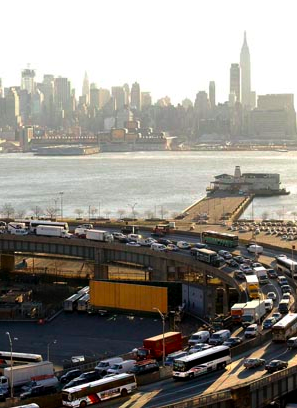
The XBL, or exclusive bus lane, on Lincoln Tunnel in morning rush hour, leads to PABT.

PABT is the gateway for most bus and jitney traffic entering Manhattan with more than 190,000 passengers on 6,000 bus trips made through the Lincoln Tunnel and terminal daily. The Lincoln Tunnel Approach and Helix (Route 495) in Hudson County, New Jersey passes through a cut and descends the Hudson Palisades to the Lincoln Tunnel; PABT is located at the other end. Starting in 1964, studies were conducted to address the feasibility of an exclusive bus lane (XBL) during the weekday morning peak period. The XBL, first implemented in 1970, serves weekday eastbound bus traffic between 6 a.m. and 10 a.m. The lane is fed by the New Jersey Turnpike at Exits 16E and 17 and New Jersey Route 3. The helix, tunnel, and terminal are owned and operated by the Port Authority of New York and New Jersey (PANYNJ), the bi-state agency that also implements the 2.5-mile (4.02 km) contraflow express bus left lane in three westbound lanes. The XBL serves over 1,800 buses and 65,000 bus commuters on regular weekday mornings and is a major component of the morning "inbound" commutation crossing the Hudson River. Over 100 bus carriers utilize the Exclusive Bus Lane. As of 2013, New Jersey Transit operates fifty-seven interstate bus routes through the Lincoln Tunnel, as do numerous regional and long-distance companies.

Despite the XBL to the tunnel, there are often long delays due to congestion caused by the limited capacity of bus lanes for deboarding passengers at the bus terminal, which has reached its capacity. leading to re-routing and overflow on local streets In December 2011, the New Jersey Assembly passed a resolution calling upon the PANYNJ to address the issue of congestion. Congestion contributed to a decline of the on-time performance of buses, which was 92 percent in 2012 and 85 percent in the first quarter of 2014. Thomas Duane, representing New York's 29th Senate District which includes the area around PABT, has also called for reduced congestion in the neighborhood. A consortium of regional transportation advocates, the Tri-State Transportation Campaign, have proposed a reconfiguration and expansion of the terminal, a PM westbound XBL, bus stops at other Manhattan locations, and a new bus storage depot. A proposed bus garage in Midtown, so that daytime turnover buses could avoid unnecessarily traveling through the tunnel without passengers, was scrapped by the agency in October 2011. In May 2012, the commissioner of NJDOT suggested that some NJ Transit routes could originate/terminate at other Manhattan locations, notably the East Side; an arrangement requiring approval of the NYC Department of Transportation (NYCDOT) to use bus stops.
