= Short Line (bus company) =

Bus services owned by Coach USA

Short Line Bus

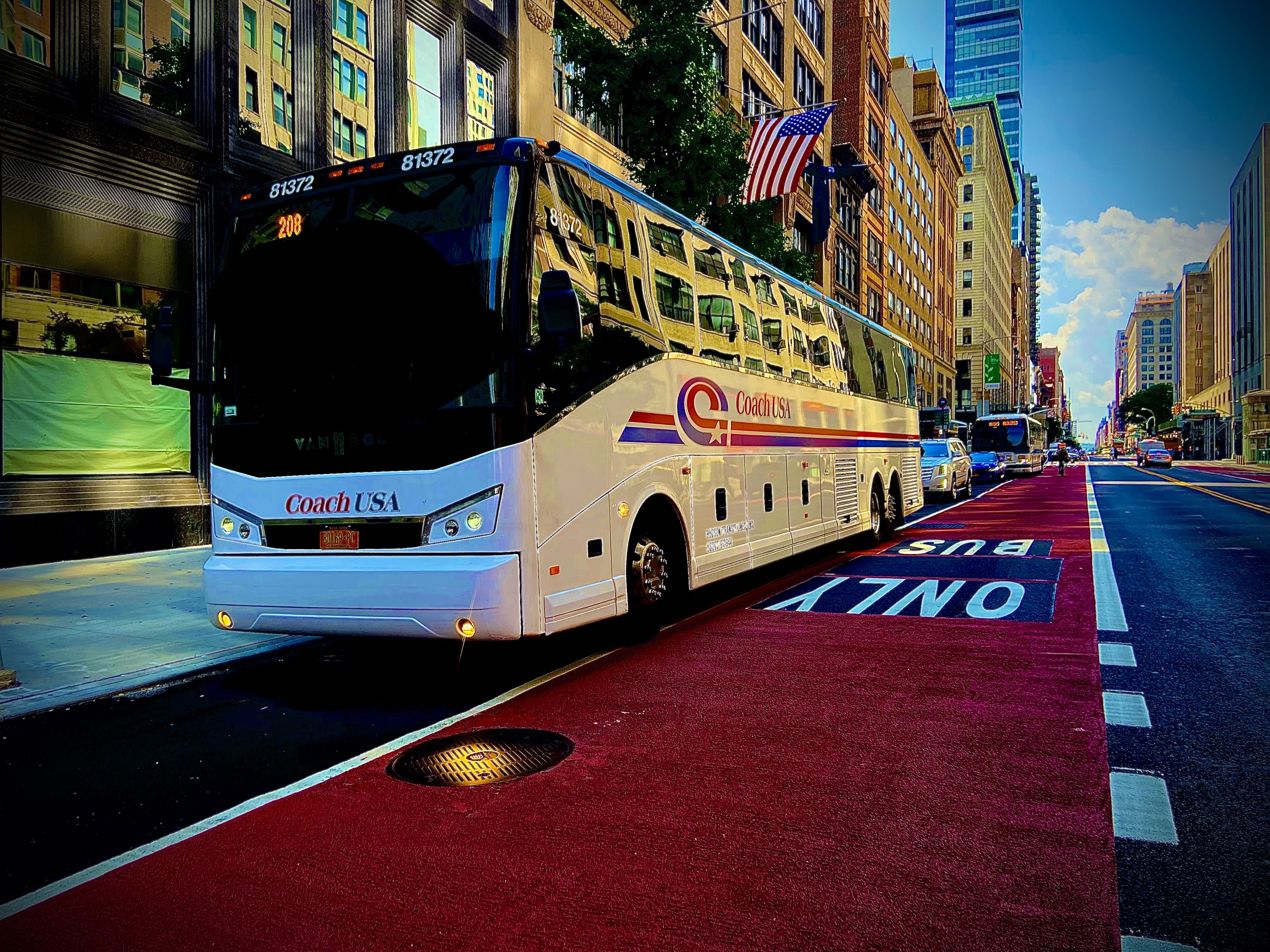
- Short Line Bus #81372 lays over on 23rd Street and Lexington Avenue in Manhattan, before starting a run on the 208-GWB Eastside Commuter route.
- Parent: Coach USA
- Founded: 1922
- Headquarters: 66 Tetz Road, Chester, NY 10918
- Locale: New York
- Service area: Greater New York, Southern Tier, Hudson Valley, Finger Lakes
- Service type: Local, intercity, contract, and charter bus service
- Alliance: Trailways (Route 96 only)
- Routes: 29
- Hubs: PABT, Middletown, Monticello, Newburgh, and Binghamton
- Stations: GWB Bus Terminal, PABT
- Fleet: 233
- Website: www.coachusa.com/shortline

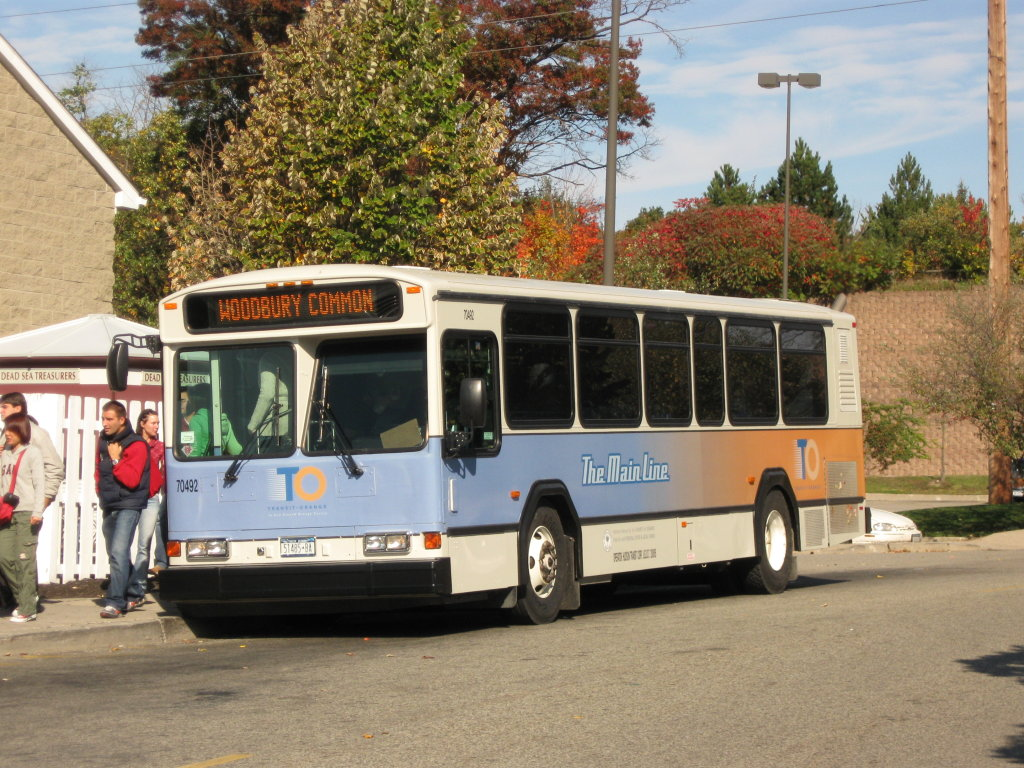
The Main Line route, operated with TransitOrange buses

Short Line is a brand name for three different Coach USA companies, Hudson Transit Lines, Hudson Transit Corporation, and Chenango Valley Bus Lines that provide local, commuter and intercity bus service in lower New York State, primarily along the Route 17 and Southern Tier corridor. Coach USA acquired the companies in 1998. After Coach USA filed for Chapter 11 bankruptcy and placed its assets for sale in 2024, Short Line was sold to The Renco Group.

== Service types ==
=== Local bus service ===
Short Line, under contract to Orange County, provides local bus service along the former Erie Main Line corridor along Route 17M. ShortLine also owns local routes traveling along Routes 17K and 32 in Orange County, as well as local routes traveling onward from Middletown onward to Route 209, and to other towns along Route 17.

=== Commuter bus service ===
Within the New York metropolitan area, ShortLine operates commuter services along the Route 17 corridor, Interstate 84, Routes 208 and 32, and Rockland and Bergen (NJ Route 17) counties to New York City.

In addition, under contract to the New York State Department of Transportation and Rockland County Department of Public Transportation, ShortLine provides commuter bus service from Orange and Rockland Counties to White Plains and Tarrytown.

=== Intercity bus service ===
Within and beyond the New York metropolitan area, ShortLine provides scheduled service to and from Long Island to the Southern Tier (via Middletown and Monticello) and service to and from major colleges and universities in the region, such as Cornell University, SUNY Alfred, Binghamton University, Ithaca College, and SUNY Albany, and intermediate points. The central hub for all of these routes is Binghamton, via Routes X178 and 495.

== Safety incidents ==
On June 12, 2017, in New York City, a Hudson Transit Lines bus driver ran over and killed a Citi Bike rider. The bus driver was arrested due to this incident, on a misdemeanor charge.

== See also ==
- Greyhound Lines
- Trailways of New York
