= New York City Regional Center =

NYC organization securing capital for real estate and infrastructure projects

The New York City Regional Center (NYCRC) secures capital for real estate and infrastructure projects throughout New York City. Established in 2008, NYCRC has provided over $1.5 billion of capital to help fund a broad spectrum of economic development projects in Brooklyn, Queens, Manhattan, and the Bronx. These projects have successfully utilized NYCRC financing to assist in the construction of over 3.5 million square feet of new development and renovation as well as infrastructure upgrades resulting in thousands of new jobs for New Yorkers.

The NYCRC was approved by the United States Citizenship and Immigration Services (USCIS), a division of the United States Department of Homeland Security, to secure foreign investment under the EB-5 Immigrant Investor Program. The company was the first designated regional center in New York City.

== Economic development loans ==
The NYCRC has provided over $1.5 billion of capital to fund a wide variety of real estate and infrastructure projects in New York City. As of June 2018, 21 economic development projects have successfully utilized NYCRC financing to assist in the construction of over 3.5 million square feet of new development and renovation as well as infrastructure upgrades. Much of this capital has been invested in underserved areas of New York City in need of long-term economic growth. Examples include:

- $220 million to finance ground-up construction in the Bronx;
- $108.5 million to finance ground-up and redevelopment projects in Washington Heights (an Upper Manhattan Empowerment Zone); and,
- $767 million to finance ground-up, redevelopment, and infrastructure projects in Brooklyn, including seven projects totaling $339 million in the Brooklyn Navy Yard.

Examples of economic development projects utilizing loans provided by NYCRC-managed funds include the following:

- A new wireless infrastructure network in New York City's subway stations
- Redevelopment of a new cargo facility at JFK International Airport
- Redevelopment of multiple unused buildings and surrounding infrastructure upgrades in the Brooklyn Navy Yard, New York City's largest industrial park
- Phase 1 of Fresh Direct's new food processing and distribution facility in the South Bronx
- New soundstages and production support space at Steiner Studios, New York City's largest film and television studio
- Redevelopment of the George Washington Bridge Bus Station in Washington Heights
- City Point retail complex in Downtown Brooklyn
- A new hotel and medical office complex in Washington Heights
- Key components of the Atlantic Yards redevelopment in Brooklyn
- Expansion of the Hutchinson Metro Center in the Bronx
- A new high speed Wi-Fi infrastructure network on the streets of New York City named LinkNYC.

As the manager of the lender, the NYCRC has been deemed a Recognized Mortgagee, Recognized Lender, and/or Institutional Investor by the following New York government entities: City of New York; State of New York; Port Authority of New York & New Jersey; New York City Economic Development Corporation; Battery Park City Authority; Brooklyn Navy Yard Development Corporation; and the Metropolitan Transportation Authority.

Over the past two years, the United States Department of Treasury has awarded a total of $65 million in New Market Tax Credit allocations to a NYCRC-managed entity. To receive this allocation, the NYCRC was required to demonstrate a mission and long-term track record of investment in low income communities.

== Immigration approvals ==
In addition to helping to fuel economic development in New York City, NYCRC offerings have enabled over 4,650 individuals to become permanent residents of the United States through the EB-5 Immigrant Investor Program. Over 5,770 individuals have also received conditional residency in the United States. Investors in NYCRC offerings have received approximately 1,600 I-829 petition approvals.

Over 3,000 individuals from over 29 different countries have invested in NYCRC project offerings to date. These countries include Belarus, Brazil, Canada, China, Colombia, Dubai, Ecuador, Egypt, France, Germany, Great Britain, India, Indonesia, Italy, Japan, Jordan, Macau, Mexico, Nepal, Netherlands, Nigeria, Poland, Russia, South Korea, Switzerland, Taiwan, Turkey, Venezuela, and Vietnam.

== EB-5 program ==
The EB-5 program was established in 1991 by the United States Congress to stimulate economic development through foreign investment. The program's mandate is to use foreign investment to spur job creation while simultaneously affording eligible foreign investors and family members to become lawful permanent residents of the United States. Over the past fifteen years, the EB-5 program has grown and become an effective economic development vehicle throughout the nation as well as a growing visa option for families around the world.

Through the EB-5 program, a person and their immediate family members can obtain permanent residency in the United States by investing $500,000 into a USCIS-approved project located in a Targeted Employment Area which creates a minimum of 10 jobs for U.S. workers. The majority of foreign investors participate in the EB-5 program by investing in commercial enterprises managed by designated “regional centers”. Regional centers are entities approved by USCIS to secure foreign investment under the EB-5 program and to use such investment to promote job creation with a defined geographic area.
