= George Washington Bridge Bus Station =

Commuter bus terminal in New York City

Coordinates: 40°50′56″N 73°56′18″W

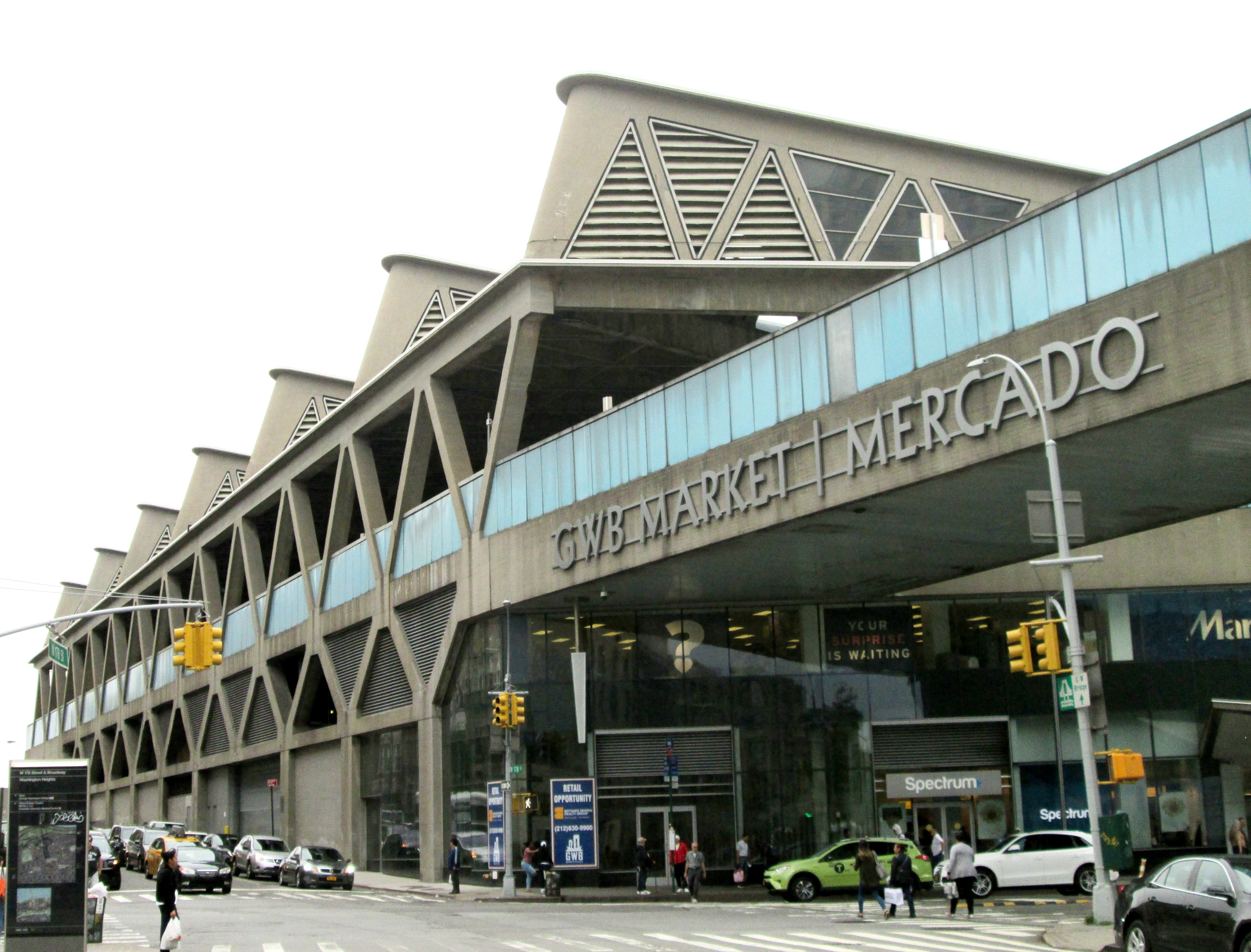
- View of the station from the southeast, 2018

General information
- Location: between Ft. Washington & Wadsworth Aves, and W. 178th & W. 179th Sts. Manhattan, New York City; United States
- Owner: Port Authority of New York and New Jersey
- Operator: Port Authority of New York and New Jersey
- Platforms: 21 gates (upper level)
- Bus routes: NJ Transit Bus: 171, 175, 178, 181, 182, 186, 188
- Bus operators: See Bus Service below
- Connections: New York City Subway: at 175th Street at 181st Street

Construction
- Accessible: Yes
- Architect: Pier Luigi Nervi

Other information
- Website: GWBBS

History
- Opened: January 17, 1963
- Rebuilt: 2013–2017 renovations

Passengers
- 2015: 6.9 million
Location

The George Washington Bridge Bus Station is a commuter bus terminal at the east end of the George Washington Bridge in the Washington Heights neighborhood of Manhattan in New York City. The bus station is owned and operated by the Port Authority of New York and New Jersey (PANYNJ). On a typical weekday, approximately 20,000 passengers on about 1,000 buses use the station.

The building is an example of mid-century urban renewal and structural expressionism. Designed by the Italian architect-engineer Pier Luigi Nervi, the new bus station was hailed as a robust tour-de-force of infrastructure ingenuity by leading critics of the day. While later noting the station's neglect from decades of deferred maintenance, the architecture critic Ada Louise Huxtable heralded the design of the station as "a work of the first rank that demonstrates the art and science of reinforced concrete construction at its 20th-century highpoint, in the hands of one of its greatest masters."

The terminal was first proposed in 1955, following earlier attempts to construct a bus station at the George Washington Bridge's eastern end. The Port Authority hired Nervi to design the terminal in early 1960, and it opened on January 17, 1963. In its early years, the George Washington Bridge Bus Station was underused compared to the Port Authority Bus Terminal. A major renovation, including an expansion of retail space from 30,000 to 120,000 square feet (3,000 to 11,000 m^{2}), was announced in 2008; the project began in late 2013 and was expected to cost more than US$183 million. The renovated station reopened on May 16, 2017, two years behind schedule, $17 million over budget, and still unfinished.

== Description ==
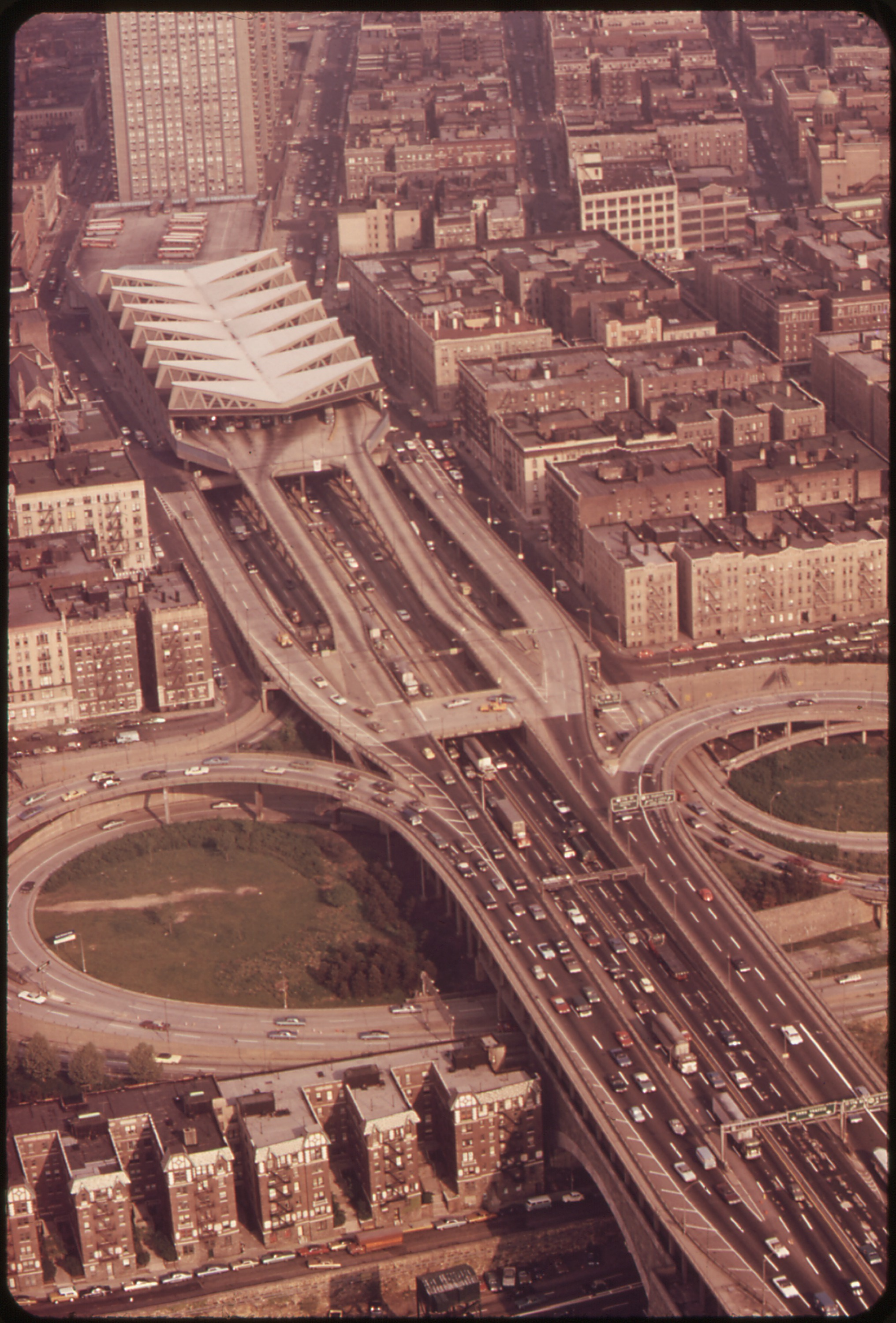
Aerial view of station and the Trans-Manhattan Expressway

The station is built over the Trans-Manhattan Expressway (Interstate 95) between 178th and 179th Streets and Fort Washington and Wadsworth Avenues, and features direct bus ramps on and off the upper level of the bridge. The building was designed by the Italian engineer Pier Luigi Nervi and is one of only a few buildings he designed outside of Italy. The structure measures 400 by 185 feet (122 by 56 m) long. Early plans for the terminal indicate that it contained 10 platforms for suburban buses on its top level, which collectively had 36 loading positions. At ground level were shops and seven sawtooth loading positions for long-distance buses. The basement level contained a mezzanine leading to the 175th Street station of the New York City Subway.

The building is constructed of huge steel-reinforced concrete trusses, fourteen of which are cantilevered from supports in the median of the Trans-Manhattan Expressway, which it straddles. The roof was constructed of 26 triangular sections, each measuring 66 by 92 feet (20 by 28 m) and composed of 36 concrete panels. The design of the roof was intended to disperse exhaust from buses idling there. The building's roof trusses have been described as resembling butterflies, as seen in aerial views. When the terminal was constructed in 1963, the Port Authority believed the design of the roof would eliminate the need to install air conditioning.

The building contains murals as well as busts of George Washington and Othmar Amman, the civil engineer who designed the bridge. The building received the 1963 Concrete Industry Board's Award. The entire facility is wheelchair-accessible. The terminal was criticized by one writer as "a brutal assault on the senses".

== History ==
=== Development ===
The George Washington Bridge between New York and New Jersey was opened in 1931; only its current upper deck existed at the time. As early as 1952, the PANYNJ (at the time the Port of New York Authority) had proposed widening a one-block stretch of 178th Street between Fort Washington Avenue and Broadway and creating a bus terminal there. The terminal would have contained three platforms for interstate buses and a connection to the 175th Street subway station. This would have required the demolition of three apartment houses and the building of the Young Men's and Women's Hebrew Association of Washington Heights.

A lower deck for the George Washington Bridge, a new Trans-Manhattan Expressway connecting the bridge to the Cross Bronx Expressway, a new bus terminal above the new expressway, and other highway connections near the bridge were recommended in a 1955 study that suggested improvements to the New York City area's highway system. The Port Authority announced plans for the $12 million bus station in February 1957. The planned terminal would be able to accommodate 255 buses per hour, allowing 70 percent more interstate buses to use the bridge. The Port Authority would have to relocate 10,000 families to make way for the bus terminal and connecting ramps, prompting opposition from the area's U.S. representative, Herbert Zelenko. The New York City Planning Commission approved the improvements in June 1957, and the Port Authority allocated funds to the improvement that July. In approving the bus terminal, the City Planning Commission mandated that the terminal be an enclosed structure.

The Port Authority announced in March 1960 that it had hired Nervi to design a three-story, $13 million bus terminal above the Trans-Manhattan Expressway. The agency had decided to hire Nervi after seeing several of his other designs, including the Stadio Flaminio in Rome, which Nervi had designed for the 1960 Summer Olympics. The terminal's foundations were already complete at the time, while the ramps to the terminal were being built. The Port Authority awarded a $9.6 million contract that December to the W. J. Barney Corporation and William L. Crow Company for the construction of the terminal's roof. In February 1961, contractors erected the largest of 40 steel girders carrying the terminal above the Trans-Manhattan Expressway. The steel frame of the terminal had been completed by that April, and workers had begun pouring concrete around the steel.

=== Opening and early modifications ===
The George Washington Bridge Bus Station opened on January 17, 1963, and was officially dedicated by New York governor Nelson Rockefeller and New Jersey governor Richard J. Hughes the next day. After passengers complained that the terminal's open-air design let in cold air, the Port Authority approved the installation of a retractable plastic membrane in August 1963 at a cost of $200,000. The PANYNJ also installed glass walls and louvers to protect passengers from strong winds from the west, and it installed heated glass-and-aluminum canopies above the ten departure platforms. Although the bus terminal was intended to replace a series of sidewalk bus loading areas that existed between 166th and 167th streets further south, the last bus route did not relocate to the new terminal until 1967.

In its early years, the George Washington Bridge Bus Station was underused, as most passengers from New Jersey preferred to travel to the Port Authority Bus Terminal in Midtown Manhattan. Upon the George Washington Bridge terminal's first anniversary, 750 buses served the terminal on an average day, carrying 20,500 passengers. By 1974, The New York Times had written that the George Washington Bridge Bus Station "has never been a success and is still under-utilized".

The PANYNJ hired developer McCann Real Equities in July 1999 to study the feasibility of erecting a multiplex cinema above the bus station. Had the multiplex been built, it would have contained 12 screens with a total of 2,800 seats and would have been operated by McCann under a 40-year lease. The multiplex would have cost $20 million. Ultimately, the multiplex was never built; there had been other unsuccessful plans to use the air rights above the terminal. By the 2000s, the terminal retained much of its original design but had fallen into disrepair.

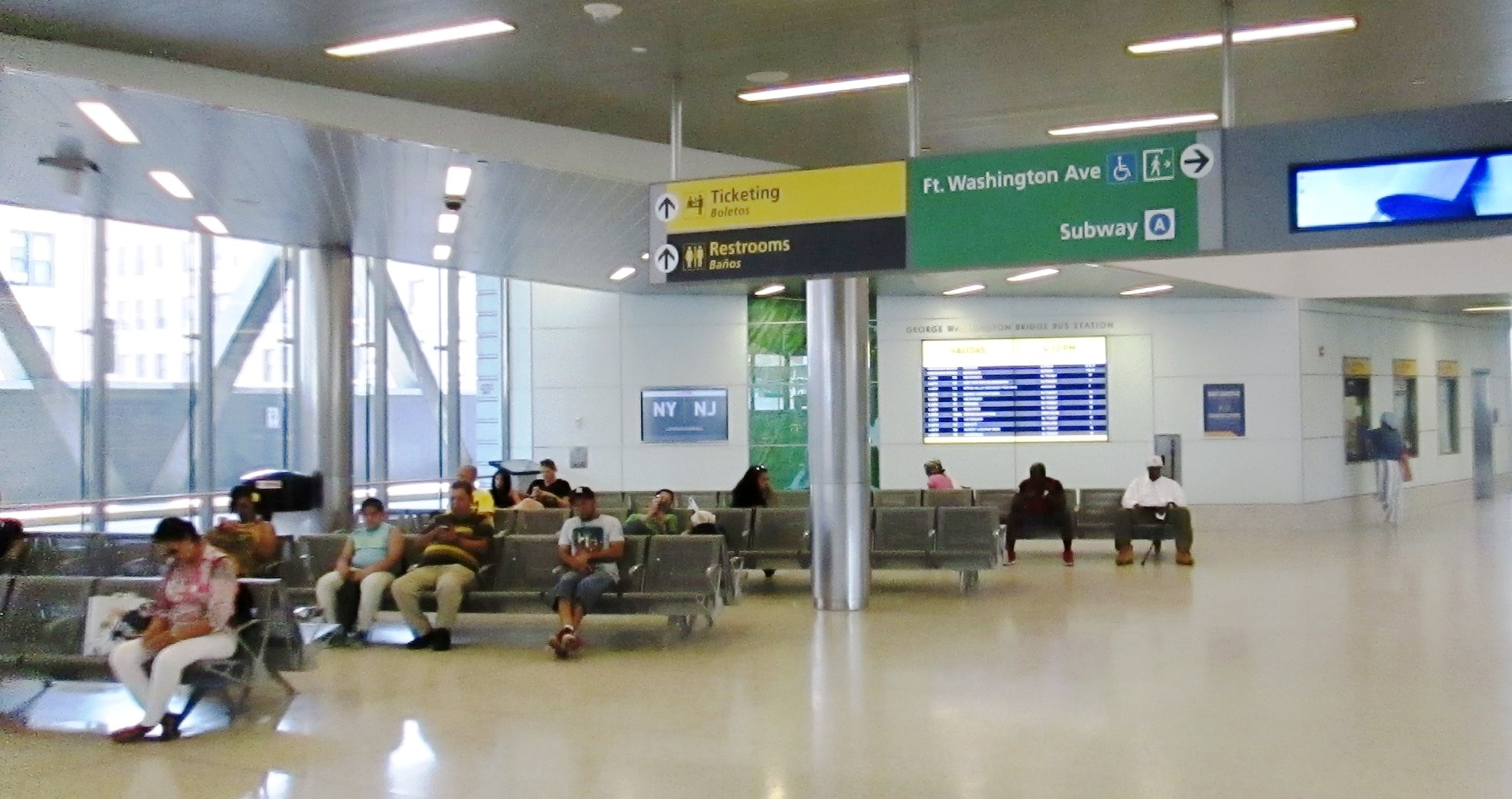
The renovated waiting room (June 2018)

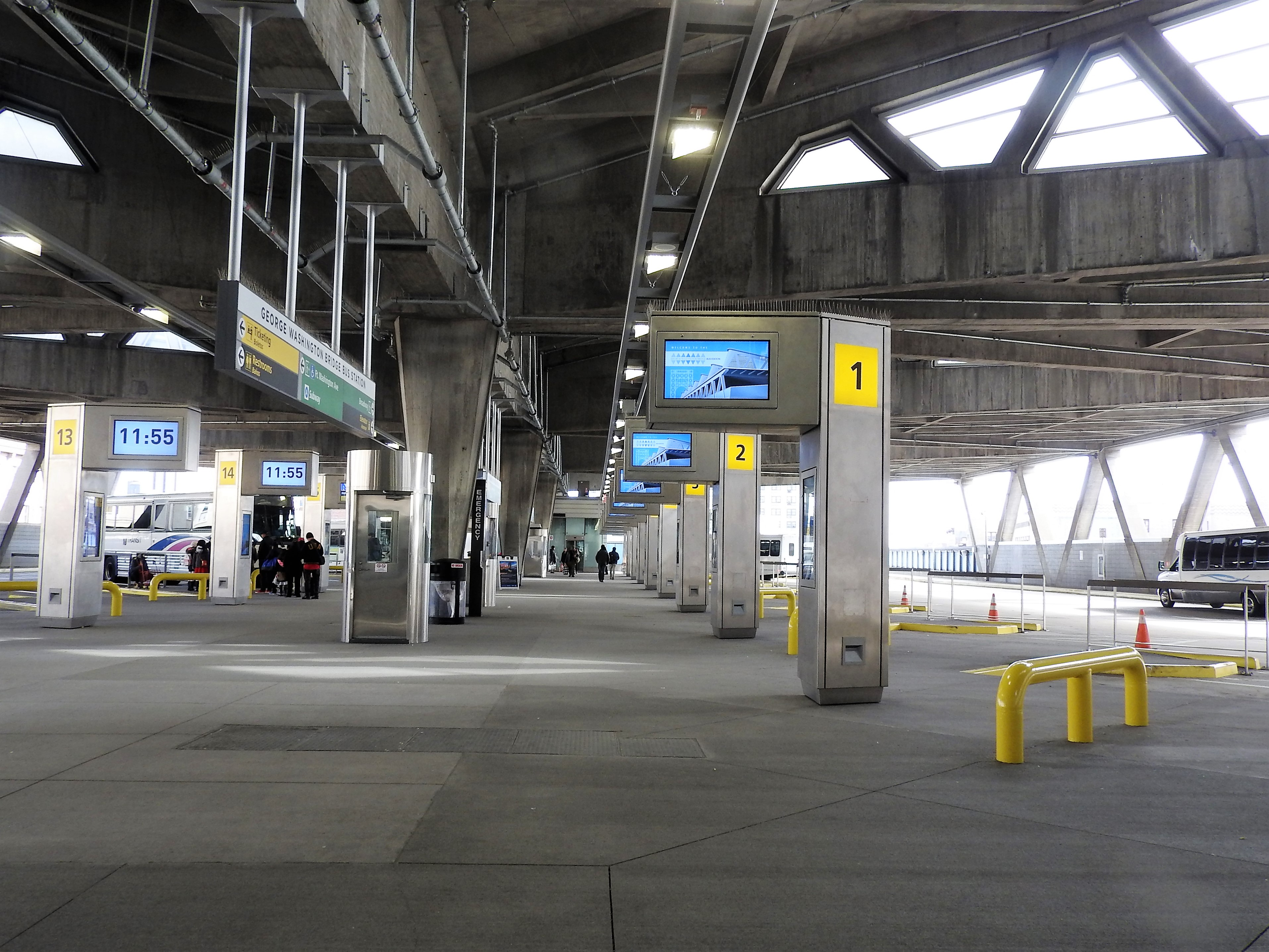
Renovated bus boarding area with display screens (November 2017)

=== Renovation ===
The PANYNJ approved a $152 million renovation of the George Washington Bridge Bus Station in October 2008. The Port Authority was to contribute $49.5 million to the project, while developer Acadia would pay $102 million. Although the terminal had accommodated 300,000 buses during the preceding year, carrying five million passengers, it had become dated and had never become as busy as the Port Authority Bus Terminal. The George Washington Bridge Bus Station lacked air-conditioning; it still contained payphones, at a time when many payphones across the city had been removed; and most of its retail activity consisted of off-track betting and sales of lottery tickets and cheap coffee. Later that month, the PANYNJ revealed designs for the terminal's renovation. The project was postponed due to the 2008 financial crisis.

The agency announced in July 2011 that the project would proceed after the PANYNJ signed an agreement with a consortium of developers who would lease the terminal's retail space for 99 years. At that point, the cost had increased to $183 million. The developers were to provide $100 million for the project, while the PANYNJ would pay $83.2 million. Development firm New York City Regional Center (NYCRC) initially lent $72 million to the private developers, and NYCRC later lent another $19 million for the project. At the time of the announcement, the project was to begin in January 2012 and be completed by early 2013.

The renovated building was to be improved with better access to local subway stops, displays of bus departure and arrival times, central air conditioning, and full ADA-compliant accessibility. It would increase retail space from 30,000 to 120,000 square feet (3,000 to 11,000 m^{2}). Large tenants like Marshalls, Key Food, and Blink Fitness leased some of the terminal's retail space before the renovation began. Tutor Perini received a $100 million construction contract in August 2013. The Port Authority and a private company, known as GWBBS Development Venture LLC, began renovating the station later the same year. The bus station's main concourse was temporarily closed for renovations in August 2014. Although buses continued to stop at the terminal, the renovation was delayed significantly; the scheduled completion date of 2015 was postponed at least twice. According to The New York Times, the delays became "a sore point in Washington Heights".

The terminal reopened on May 16, 2017, two years behind schedule, $17 million over budget, and still unfinished. Tutor Perini filed a $120 million lawsuit against the PANYNJ in July 2019 over the project's "delays and cost overruns". GWBBS Development Venture LLC filed for Chapter 11 bankruptcy protection that October, in part because of the delays, cost overruns, and arbitration proceedings with Tutor Perini. Monarch Alternative Capital LP offered to take over the leasehold of the station's retail space, but negotiations with the PANYNJ stalled. NYCRC sued the PANYNJ in 2021, claiming that the agency was trying to wipe out the firm's investment in the terminal by interfering with the planned sale of the retail leasehold. Aurora Capital Associates and Bridges Development Group acquired the retail leasehold in December 2022 for $46 million.

== Subway connection ==
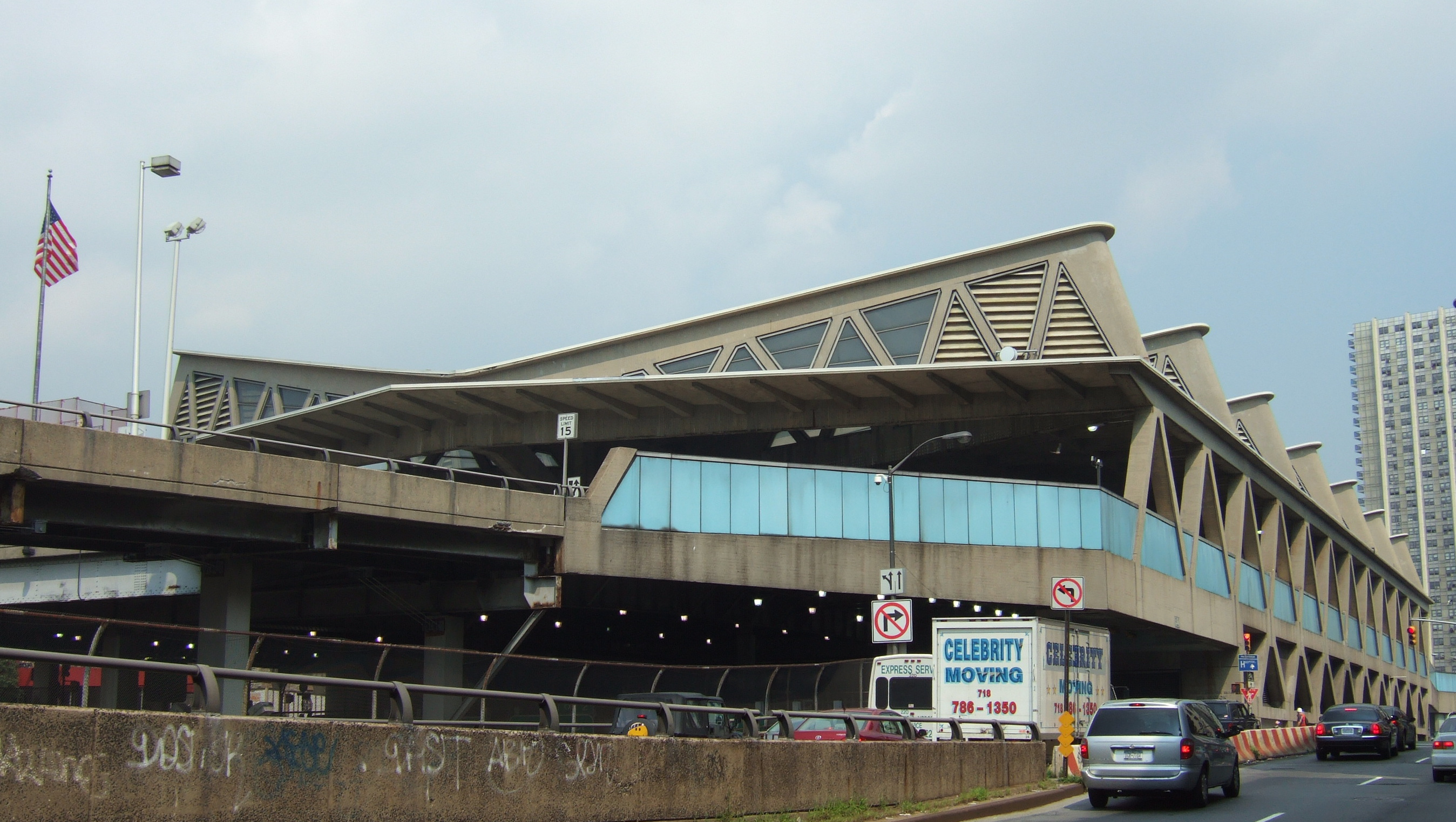
The station seen from the western approach in 2006

The complex is served by the 175th Street station of the New York City Subway. The station is on Fort Washington Avenue with entrances at 175th Street and 177th Street, the latter one block south of the bus station. The subway station, operated by the New York City Transit Authority and served by the A train, was part of the Independent Subway System (IND)'s first line, the IND Eighth Avenue Line, which opened in 1932. A pedestrian tunnel, maintained by the Port Authority of New York and New Jersey, links the bus terminal to the subway station. This tunnel is closed at night.

The bus station is also within walking distance of the 181st Street station of the same line, and the 181st Street IRT Broadway–Seventh Avenue Line station on the 1 train.

== Bus service ==
On September 20, 2017, Greyhound (under Flix SE) announced that it would be providing service to the station starting September 27, while keeping the Port Authority Bus Terminal as its primary New York City location.

As of 2020, the bus lines detailed below serve the terminal for the New York City Transit Authority, New Jersey Transit, and Coach USA (Rockland Coaches and Short Line). Service is also provided by Spanish Transportation with its Express Service jitneys. Additionally, some OurBus routes serve the George Washington Bridge Bus Station.

=== MTA Regional Bus Operations ===
Ten local MTA Regional Bus Operations routes stop at a lower level and on the streets outside the station. The M4 stops on Fort Washington Avenue, while the M5, M100 and Bx7 stop on Broadway. The M98, Bx3, Bx11, Bx13, Bx35 and Bx36 stop on 178th and 179th Streets between Fort Washington Avenue and Broadway. All routes are ADA-accessible.

Route	Terminal	via	notes
M4	The Cloisters or Fort Tryon Park (north) Fifth Avenue/32nd Street, Koreatown (south)	Broadway and Fifth Avenue	Bus only runs to the Cloisters when the museum is open; it only runs to Fort Tryon Park at all other times.
M5	Broadway/31st Street, Garment District	Riverside Drive, Fifth Avenue, and Broadway	
M98 LTD	Fort Tryon Park (north) 68th Street/Lexington Avenue (south)	Harlem River Drive and Lexington Avenue	Bus only runs during rush hours.
M100	West 220th Street/Broadway, Inwood (north) West 125th Street/St. Nicholas Avenue, Harlem (south)	Broadway and Amsterdam Avenues	
Bx3	238th Street station, Riverdale, Bronx	University Avenue	
Bx7	West 263rd Street/Riverdale Avenue, Riverdale, Bronx (north) 168th Street station (south)	Broadway, Johnson Avenue, Henry Hudson Parkway	
Bx11	Parkchester station, Parkchester, Bronx	170th Street, Claremont Parkway, East 174th Street	
Bx13	Bronx Terminal Market (extended to Third Avenue/163rd Street, rush hours)	West 181st Street, Ogden Avenue, East 161st Street	
Bx35	Jennings Street and West Farms Road, Longwood, Bronx	Edward L. Grant Highway, East 167th Street, East 168th Street, East 169th Street	
Bx36	Olmstead Avenue and Randall Avenue, Soundview, Bronx	Tremont Avenue, White Plains Road	

=== New Jersey Transit ===
Route	Terminal	via	notes
171	Paterson Broadway Bus Terminal	GWB Plaza; Route 4	Spanish Transportation operates jitneys along a similar route to Paterson
175	Ridgewood Bus Terminal	GWB Plaza; New Jersey Route 4 Hackensack, Paramus, Rochelle Park	Some trips do not stop at Bergen Community College
178	Hackensack Bus Terminal	GWB Plaza, New Jersey Route 4 Grand Avenue, Teaneck Armory, Englewood Avenue	Englewood/Teaneck (northern route) variant of Route 182
181	Bergenline Ave. Station	GWB Plaza, Palisade Avenue, Bergenline Avenue	Limited peak and evening service Monday–Saturday. Other times, use the Spanish Transportation route, which runs down Bergenline Avenue and continues to Jersey City.
182	Hackensack Bus Terminal	GWB Plaza, Fort Lee Road, DeGraw Avenue	Leonia/Teaneck/Bogota (southern route) variant of 178
186	Dumont	GWB Plaza, Sylvan Avenue, Palisade Avenue, Teaneck Road	
188	West New York	GWB Plaza, via River Road Edgewater; 60 Street at Kennedy Boulevard	Limited weekend service

=== Coach USA ===
==== Rockland Coaches ====
Route	Terminals	via
9A & 9AT	New City (9A and 9W) (full-time); Central Nyack (9W) or Stony Point (9) (peak service only)	Sylvan Avenue, Oak Tree Road, Piermont Avenue/River Road, Broadway, Nyack Turnpike (Central Nyack trips only) Lake Road, Main Street, Route 9W (Stony Point is served on select rush-hour trips)

==== Short Line Bus ====
Route	Service	Terminals	Serving	Notes
208	PM peak	Montgomery, NY; Route 211 and Clinton Street	Washingtonville, Monroe, Central Valley, Ridgewood, NJ	Route owned by the New York State DOT.
208	AM peak	East Side, Manhattan; 23rd Street and 2nd Avenue	Manhattan neighborhoods: Washington Heights, Harlem, East Harlem, Yorkville, Upper East Side, Turtle Bay, Murray Hill, Kips Bay.	Route owned by the New York State DOT.; Does not serve GWB Bus Station and GWB Bridge Plaza.

== See also ==
- Port Authority Bus Terminal
- Journal Square Transportation Center
- George Washington Bridge Plaza, across the bridge in Fort Lee, New Jersey
