= Spanish Transportation =

Privately operated bus company in New Jersey, USA

Spanish Transportation, officially Spanish Transportation Service Corporation, and operating under the name Express Service, is a privately operated bus company, which leases minibuses to individual operators, who provide service in and between various communities in northeastern New Jersey and to Manhattan in New York City. The fleet consists mostly of jitneys, often called "the Spanish bus" or "dollar vans" by their English-speaking users, or guaguas by their majority-Spanish clientele.

== Service levels ==
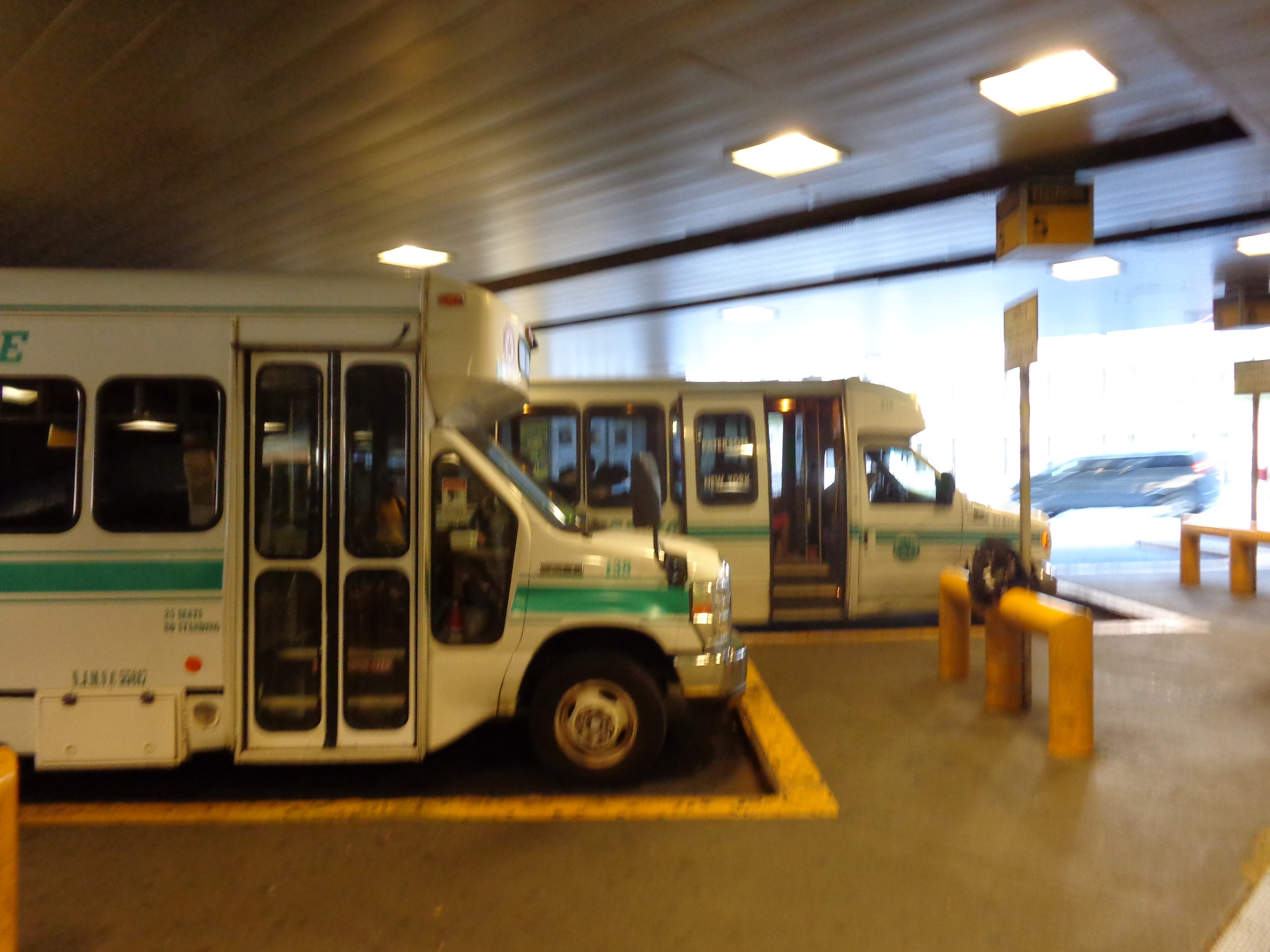
At GWB Bus Station

The company started in 1993, and carries up to 40,000 passengers per day. It has several routes that parallel New Jersey Transit bus routes, both competing with them and supplementing them. Unlike NJ Transit's similarly operating routes, Spanish Transportation services:

- cannot accommodate wheelchairs, strollers, or luggage
- do not offer discounts for children under 12, senior citizens, or the walking disabled
- do not offer multi-ride discounts (e.g., monthly passes)
- provide more frequent service
- allow for more flexible pickup and drop-off locations, including between scheduled stops

=== Routes ===
The company's primary routes are:

- Paterson, New Jersey to Port Authority Bus Terminal (PABT), by way of Passaic, Clifton, Rutherford and Union City, and also letting off passengers on Manhattan streets nearby the PABT, mostly corresponding to NJT's #190 route.
- Paterson, New Jersey to the George Washington Bridge Bus Station in Upper Manhattan via NJ Route 4, mostly corresponding to NJT's #171 route.
- Newport Mall in Jersey City to the George Washington Bridge Bus Terminal, corresponding to NJT's 181 route (which only travels as far as the Bergenline Avenue station on the Hudson Bergen Light Rail.(Service suspended)

The Paterson route goes: inbound (Eastbound) primary route on Broadway from its Southwest corner with Washington Street (one block East of Main Street), Paterson; continuing on Broadway as changes name to Martin Luther King Jr. Way and the designation at the western terminus, which turns back into Broadway; crossing the Passaic River and all of Bergen County starting at the Paramus border where Broadway loses the name, as it becomes NJ Highway Route 4 (with a small detour to and from the northern bus stop near Entrance 10 to the Westfield Garden State Plaza mall in Paramus during mall and theater operating hours except on Sundays), losing the designation Route 4 at the eastern terminus; merging with Interstate 95 and the George Washington Bridge (over the Hudson River) and approaches in Fort Lee and Manhattan; to George Washington Bridge Bus Terminal identical to NJT's #171 route; the outbound (Westbound) return route is very similar, but its last stop is one block West, on West Broadway at its five-way corner with Broadway and Main Street in Paterson. Buses traveling the Broadway route do not stop adjacent to Eastside Park in Paterson (East of 32nd Street) because NJ Transit Bus 770 detours two blocks North on 11th Avenue from 33rd Street to 43rd Street and Paterson has not seen fit to post bus stop signs there; thus there are no bus stops at which to stop.

== Terminals ==
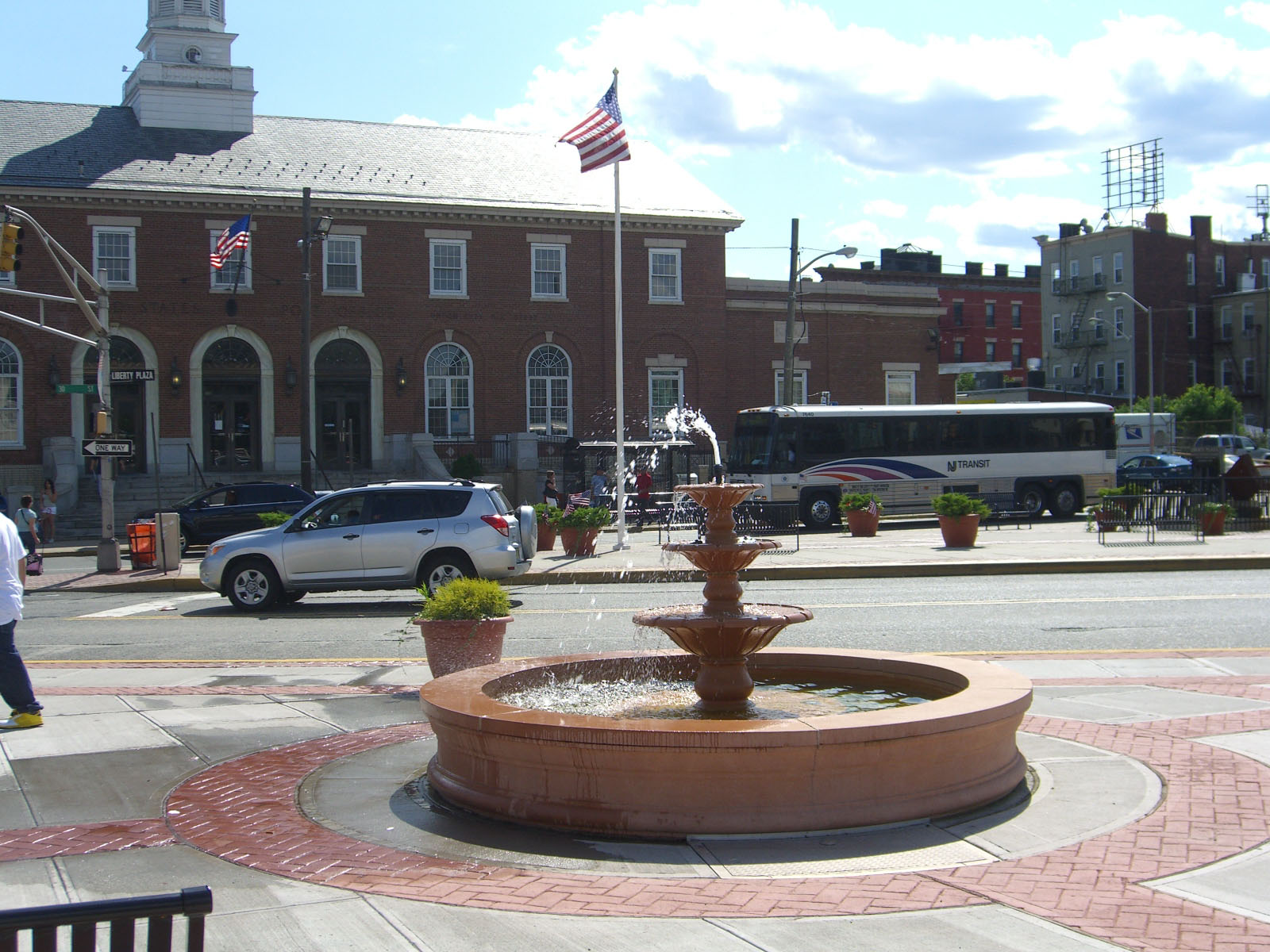
Post office in Union City at Liberty Plaza at 30th Street, which is a local collector/distributor road for New Jersey Route 495, where numerous jitneys and NJ Transit buses converge prior to proceeding to Lincoln Tunnel

The company rents space across Broadway from Broadway Bus Terminal in Paterson and in Port Authority Bus Terminal (PABT) on 42nd Street and George Washington Bridge Bus Terminal in Manhattan

== Other jitneys in North Jersey ==
In addition to Spanish Transportation owned vehicles, numerous other jitneys provide service in North Jersey, particularly Hudson County along Bergenline Avenue, Boulevard East, and Palisade Avenue. Studies were conducted to better regulate and incorporate the jitney system, which has grown since 2000. Legislation to regulate them has been introduced in the New Jersey Legislature.

Many jitneys, including some of those owned by Spanish Transportation, use local streets in the vicinity of the PABT, namely 42nd Street, as a drop-off and pick-up point for passengers and parking, which has led to congestion and complaints.
