= Ackerman House =

Ackerman House may refer to:

== United States ==
(alphabetically by state, then town)

- Ackerman–Boyd House, Franklin Lakes, New Jersey, listed on the National Register of Historic Places (NRHP) in Bergen County
- Van Houten–Ackerman House (Franklin Lakes, New Jersey), listed on the NRHP in Bergen County
- Ackerman–Hopper House, Glen Rock, New Jersey, listed on the NRHP in Bergen County
- Ackerman–Demarest House, Ho-Ho-Kus, New Jersey, listed on the NRHP in Bergen County
- Ackerman House (222 Doremus Avenue, Ridgewood, New Jersey), listed on the NRHP in Bergen County
- Ackerman House (252 Lincoln Avenue, Ridgewood, New Jersey), listed on the NRHP in Bergen County
- David Ackerman House, Ridgewood, New Jersey, listed on the NRHP in Bergen County
- Ackerman–Van Emburgh House, Ridgewood, New Jersey, listed on the NRHP in Bergen County
- Ackerman–Zabriskie–Steuben House, River Edge, New Jersey, listed on the NRHP in Bergen County
- Ackerman–Outwater House, Rutherford, New Jersey, attached to the Yereance-Kettel house
- Ackerman House (Saddle River, New Jersey), listed on the NRHP in Bergen County
- Abram Ackerman House, Saddle River, New Jersey, listed on the NRHP in Bergen County
- Garret and Maria Ackerman House, Saddle River, New Jersey, listed on the NRHP in Bergen County
- Garret Augustus Ackerman House, Saddle River, New Jersey, listed on the NRHP in Bergen County
- Ackerman–Dater House, Saddle River, New Jersey, listed on the NRHP in Bergen County
- Ackerman–Dewsnap House, Saddle River, New Jersey, listed on the NRHP in Bergen County
- Ackerman–Smith House, Saddle River, New Jersey, listed on the NRHP in Bergen County
- Van Horn–Ackerman House, Wyckoff, New Jersey, listed on the NRHP in Bergen County
- Van Houten–Ackerman House (Wyckoff, New Jersey), listed on the NRHP in Bergen County
