= National Register of Historic Places listings in Saddle River, New Jersey =

Map of Bergen County, New Jersey, highlighting Saddle River

List of the National Register of Historic Places listings in the borough of Saddle River in Bergen County, New Jersey

Contents: Counties and communities in New Jersey
Atlantic – Bergen (Closter, Franklin Lakes, Ridgewood, Saddle River, Wyckoff) – Burlington – Camden – Cape May – Cumberland – Essex – Gloucester – Hudson – Hunterdon – Mercer – Middlesex – Monmouth – Morris – Ocean – Passaic – Salem – Somerset – Sussex – Union – Warren

The table below includes 23 sites listed on the National Register of Historic Places in the borough of Saddle River in Bergen County, New Jersey. Latitude and longitude coordinates of the sites listed on this page may be displayed in an online map.

This National Park Service list is complete through NPS recent listings posted November 6, 2026.

== Current listings ==
| | Name on the Register | Image | Date listed | Location | Description |
|---|---|---|---|---|---|
| 1 | Achenbach House | Achenbach House | April 18, 1979 (#79001475) | 184 Chestnut Ridge Road; 41°02′13″N 74°04′53″W | Part of the Early Stone Houses of Bergen County Multiple Property Submission MPS and the Saddle River MPS. Mostly destroyed by fire in 2004. |
| 2 | Ackerman House | Ackerman House | January 10, 1983 (#83001449) | 136 Chestnut Ridge Road; 41°01′42″N 74°05′07″W | Part of the Early Stone Houses of Bergen County MPS and the Saddle River MPS |
| 3 | Abram Ackerman House | Abram Ackerman House | January 10, 1983 (#83001447) | 199 E. Saddle River Road; 41°02′11″N 74°05′59″W | Part of the Early Stone Houses of Bergen County MPS and the Saddle River MPS |
| 4 | Garret and Maria Ackerman House | Garret and Maria Ackerman House | August 29, 1986 (#86001598) | 150 E. Saddle River Road; 41°01′41″N 74°05′43″W | Part of the Saddle River MPS |
| 5 | Garret Augustus Ackerman House | Garret Augustus Ackerman House | August 29, 1986 (#86001597) | 212 E. Saddle River Road; 41°02′20″N 74°05′53″W | Part of the Saddle River MPS. Demolished. |
| 6 | Ackerman–Dater House | Ackerman–Dater House | January 10, 1983 (#83001453) | 109 W. Saddle River Road; 41°01′36″N 74°06′10″W | Part of the Early Stone Houses of Bergen County MPS and the Saddle River MPS |
| 7 | Ackerman–Dewsnap House | Ackerman–Dewsnap House | August 29, 1986 (#86001599) | 176 E. Saddle River Road; 41°02′00″N 74°05′56″W | Part of the Saddle River MPS |
| 8 | Ackerman–Smith House | Ackerman–Smith House | August 29, 1986 (#86001600) | 171 E. Allendale Road; 41°02′09″N 74°04′58″W | Part of the Saddle River MPS |
| 9 | J. J. Carlock House | J. J. Carlock House | August 29, 1986 (#86001602) | 2 Chestnut Ridge Road; 41°00′21″N 74°05′22″W | Part of the Saddle River MPS |
| 10 | Evangelical Lutheran Church of Saddle River and Ramapough Building | Evangelical Lutheran Church of Saddle River and Ramapough Building | August 29, 1986 (#86001603) | 96 E. Allendale Road; 41°01′52″N 74°05′49″W | Part of the Saddle River MPS. Also known as the Zion Evangelical Lutheran Church. |
| 11 | Alonzo Foringer House and Studio | Alonzo Foringer House and Studio | August 29, 1986 (#86001604) | 107 and 107B E. Saddle River Road; 41°01′19″N 74°05′48″W | Part of the Saddle River MPS |
| 12 | Hopper House | Hopper House | July 24, 1984 (#84002569) | 45 W. Saddle River Road; 41°00′59″N 74°06′18″W | Part of the Early Stone Houses of Bergen County MPS and the Saddle River MPS |
| 13 | Joe Jefferson Clubhouse | Joe Jefferson Clubhouse | August 29, 1986 (#86001605) | 29 E. Saddle River Road; 41°00′40″N 74°05′45″W | Part of the Saddle River MPS |
| 14 | O'Blenis House | O'Blenis House | August 29, 1986 (#86001606) | 220 E. Saddle River Road; 41°02′24″N 74°05′51″W | Part of the Saddle River MPS |
| 15 | Garret K. Osborn House and Barn | Garret K. Osborn House and Barn | August 29, 1986 (#86001607) | 88 and 90 E. Allendale Road; 41°01′52″N 74°05′52″W | Part of the Saddle River MPS |
| 16 | Dr. E. G. Roy House | Dr. E. G. Roy House | August 29, 1986 (#86001608) | 229 W. Saddle River Road; 41°02′46″N 74°06′10″W | Part of the Saddle River MPS |
| 17 | Saddle River Center Historic District | Saddle River Center Historic District | August 29, 1986 (#86001609) | Along W. Saddle River Road at junction of E. Allendale Road; 41°01′53″N 74°06′10″W | Part of the Saddle River MPS |
| 18 | Stillwell–Preston House | Stillwell–Preston House | August 29, 1986 (#86001610) | 9 E. Saddle River Road; 41°00′25″N 74°05′40″W | Part of the Saddle River MPS |
| 19 | Andries Thomas Van Buskirk House | Andries Thomas Van Buskirk House | January 10, 1983 (#83001559) | 164 E. Saddle River Road; 41°01′49″N 74°05′41″W | Part of the Early Stone Houses of Bergen County MPS and the Saddle River MPS |
| 20 | Laurance Thomas Van Buskirk House | Laurance Thomas Van Buskirk House | January 10, 1983 (#83001560) | 116 E. Saddle River Road; 41°01′21″N 74°05′48″W | Part of the Early Stone Houses of Bergen County MPS and the Saddle River MPS |
| 21 | B. C. Wandell House | B. C. Wandell House | August 29, 1986 (#86001612) | 214, 223, and 224 W. Saddle River Road; 41°02′42″N 74°06′10″W | Part of the Saddle River MPS. Also known as B. C. Wandell House–The Cedars |
| 22 | F. L. Wandell Estate and Ward Factory Site | F. L. Wandell Estate and Ward Factory Site | November 1, 1990 (#86001614) | 255-261 E. Saddle River Road; 41°02′48″N 74°05′59″W | Part of the Saddle River MPS |
| 23 | Dr. John Christie Ware Bungalow | Dr. John Christie Ware Bungalow | August 29, 1986 (#86001615) | 246 E. Saddle River Road; 41°02′38″N 74°05′53″W | Part of the Saddle River MPS |
