= Van Buskirk House =

Van Buskirk House may refer to:

- Halderman–Van Buskirk Farmstead, Paw Paw Township, Indiana, listed on the NRHP in Wabash County
- John Van Buskirk Farm House, Davison, Michigan, listed on the NRHP in Genesee County
- Van Buskirk-Oakley House, Oradell, New Jersey, listed on the NRHP in Bergen County
- Andries Thomas Van Buskirk House, Saddle River, New Jersey, listed on the NRHP in Bergen County
- Laurance Thomas Van Buskirk House, Saddle River, New Jersey, listed on the NRHP in Bergen County
- Van Buskirk-Arkerman House, Saddle River, New Jersey, listed on the NRHP in Bergen County
