= Van Buskirk =

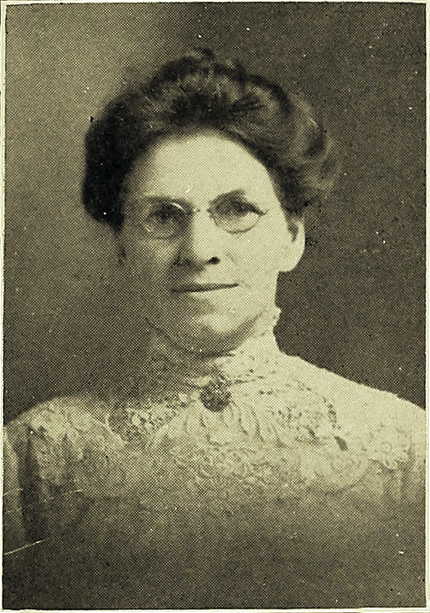
Angie Van Buskirk, member of the Woman's Christian Temperance Union

Van Buskirk is a surname. Notable people with the surname include:

== People ==
- David Van Buskirk, police officer in Windsor, Ontario, Canada
- Harold Van Buskirk (1894–1980), American architect and fencer
- Jacob Van Buskirk (1760–1834), Canadian merchant, judge and politician
- John van Buskirk (born 1972), American soccer player and coach
- Kate Van Buskirk, Canadian long-distance runner
- Lawrence Van Buskirk (1867–1910), mayor of Bloomington, Indiana
- Layne Van Buskirk, Canadian volleyball player
- Pieter Van Buskirk (c. 1665 – 1738), American settler
- Rachel Van Buskirk, ballet dancer
- Scott R. Van Buskirk, United States Navy admiral
- William C. Van Buskirk, American academic

== Fictional characters ==
- Peter Van Buskirk, a fictional character from the Lensman series

== See also ==
- Van Buskirk Island, man-made island in New Jersey, United States
- Van Buskirk, Wisconsin, unincorporated community in the United States
- Van Buskirk House (disambiguation), name of multiple historic houses
