= Van Houten–Ackerman House =

Van Houten–Ackerman House may refer to:

- Van Houten–Ackerman House (Franklin Lakes, New Jersey), NRHP-listed in Bergen County
- Van Houten–Ackerman House (Wyckoff, New Jersey), NRHP-listed in Bergen County

== See also ==
- Ackerman House (disambiguation)
