= F. L. Wandell Estate and Ward Factory Site =

- U.S. National Register of Historic Places
- New Jersey Register of Historic Places
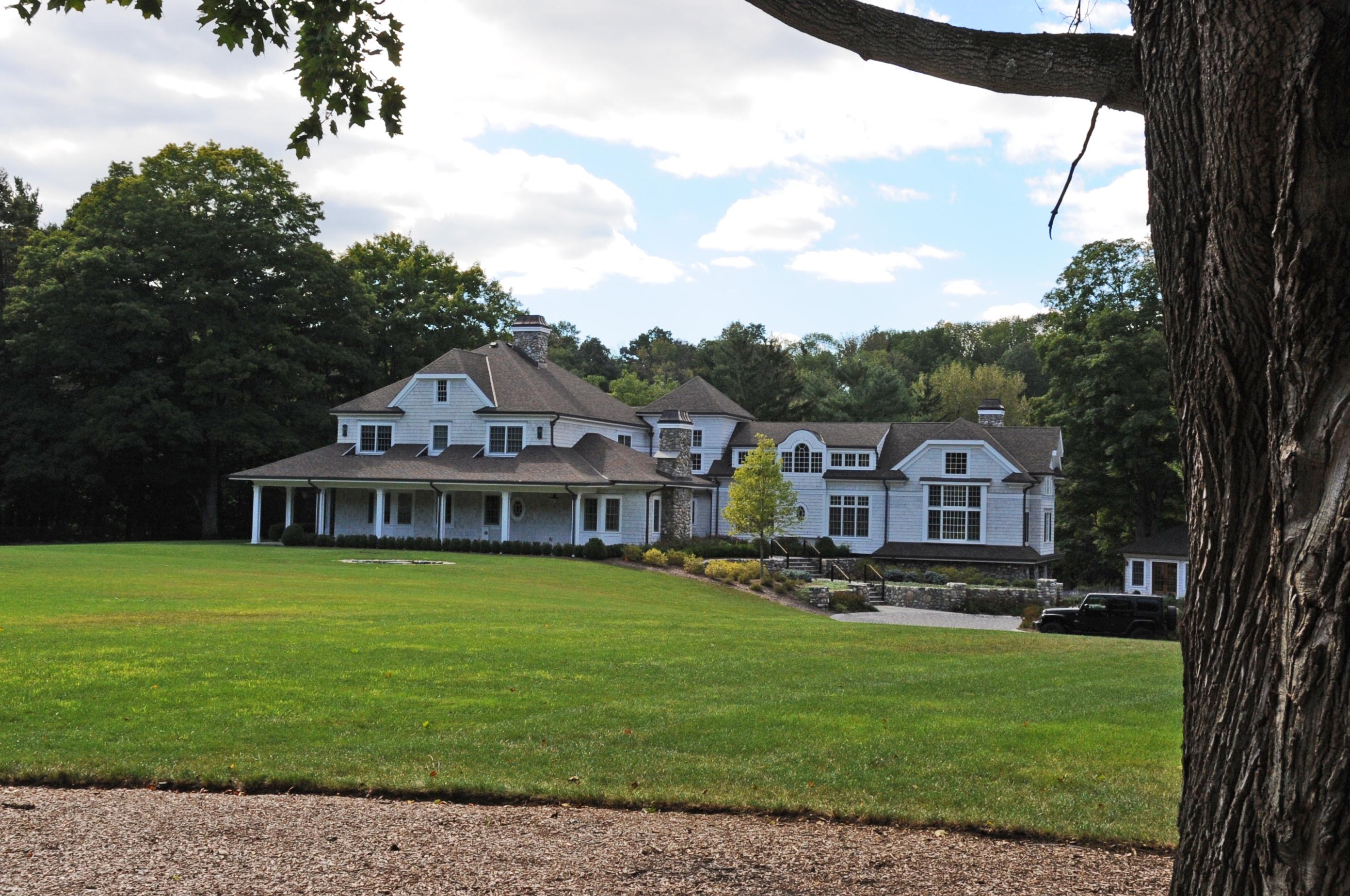

- Location within Bergen County, New Jersey Location within New Jersey Location within the United States
- Location: 255-261 East Saddle River Road, Saddle River, New Jersey
- Coordinates: 41°2′48″N 74°5′59″W
- Area: 10.3 acres (4.2 ha)
- Built: 1861
- Architectural style: Bungalow/Craftsman, Shingle Style
- MPS: Saddle River MRA
- NRHP reference No.: 86001614
- NJRHP No.: 694

Significant dates
- Added to NRHP: November 1, 1990
- Designated NJRHP: June 13, 1986

The F. L. Wandell Estate and Ward Factory Site is located in the borough of Saddle River in Bergen County, United States. The site was added to the National Register of Historic Places on November 1, 1990, for its significance in architecture, entertainment, and industry. It was listed as part of the Saddle River MPS. The house was completely gutted down to the wood frame around 2012. The houses overall shape is the same, but the exterior appearance has been greatly altered for a more contemporary style of architecture from the home's original 1800s appearance. Other major changes include the reorientation of the driveway and the addition of a swimming pool and various other aspects. The photo displayed here on Wikipedia depicts the home after the 2012 renovation. Whether any of the homes original interiors are still intact is unknown. The original barn, which is now part of the neighboring parcel still has its original exterior.

The William Ward Edge Tool Factory was located on the F. L. Wandell Estate and manufactured tools from 1868 to 1890.

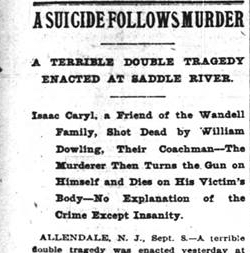
New York Times September 9th 1896

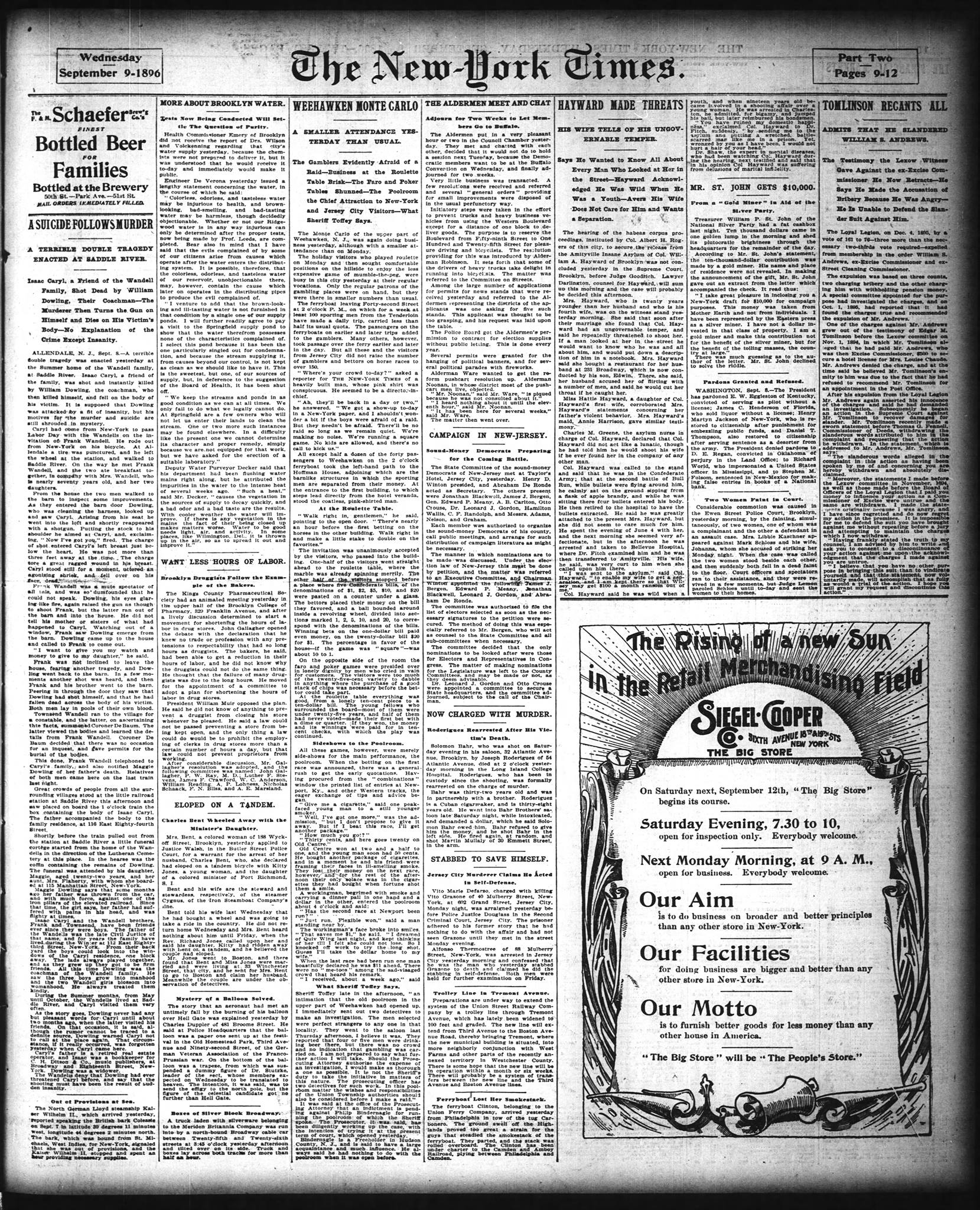
New York Times Article on 1896 Murder/Suicide

There was a murder/suicide at the estate on September 8, 1896. While visiting for Labor Day from New York City, Frank Wandell's friend Issac Caryl was shot & killed in the Estate's massive horse barn by the Wandell family's coachmen William Dowling in a "fit of insanity". Caryl was shot through the chest with a shot gun being killed almost instantly. Dowling committed suicide shortly after, also in the barn.

== See also ==
- National Register of Historic Places listings in Saddle River, New Jersey
- National Register of Historic Places listings in Bergen County, New Jersey
