= Dr. John Christie Ware Bungalow =

Historic house in New Jersey, United States

- U.S. National Register of Historic Places
- New Jersey Register of Historic Places
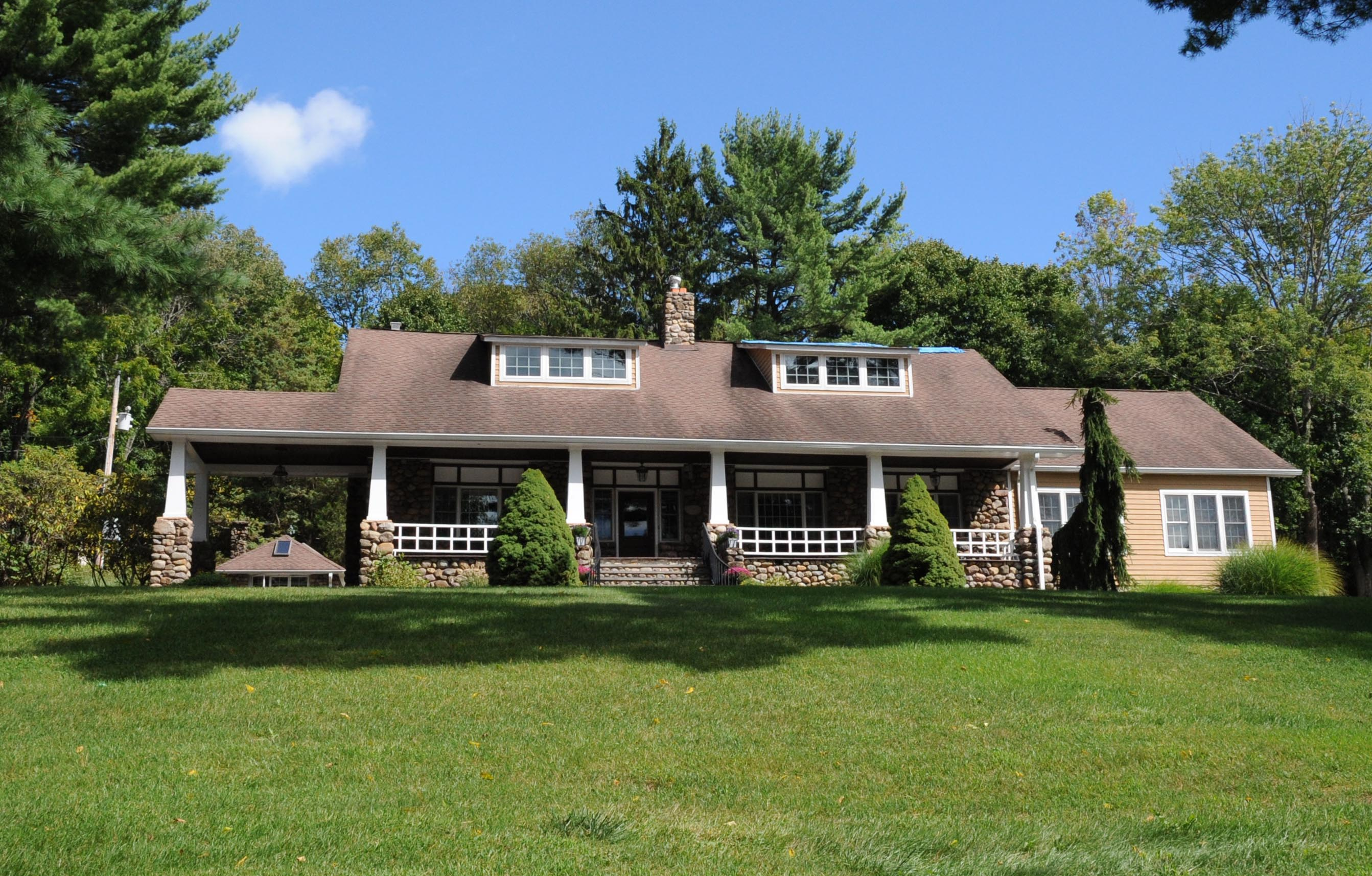

- Location within Bergen County, New Jersey Location within New Jersey Location within the United States
- Location: 246 East Saddle River Road, Saddle River, New Jersey
- Coordinates: 41°2′23″N 74°5′52″W
- Built: 1909
- Architect: John Christie Ware
- Architectural style: Bungalow, American Craftsman
- MPS: Saddle River MRA
- NRHP reference No.: 86001615
- NJRHP No.: 695

Significant dates
- Added to NRHP: August 29, 1986
- Designated NJRHP: June 13, 1986

The Dr. John Christie Ware Bungalow is located at 246 East Saddle River Road in the borough of Saddle River in Bergen County, New Jersey, United States. The historic house was built in 1909 using boulders and features American Craftsman architectural style as designed by its original owner, John Christie Ware. It was added to the National Register of Historic Places on August 29, 1986, for its significance in architecture. It was listed as part of the Saddle River Multiple Property Submission (MPS).

== See also ==
- National Register of Historic Places listings in Saddle River, New Jersey
- National Register of Historic Places listings in Bergen County, New Jersey
