= B. C. Wandell House =

Historic house in New Jersey, United States

- B. C. Wandell House–The Cedars
- U.S. National Register of Historic Places
- New Jersey Register of Historic Places
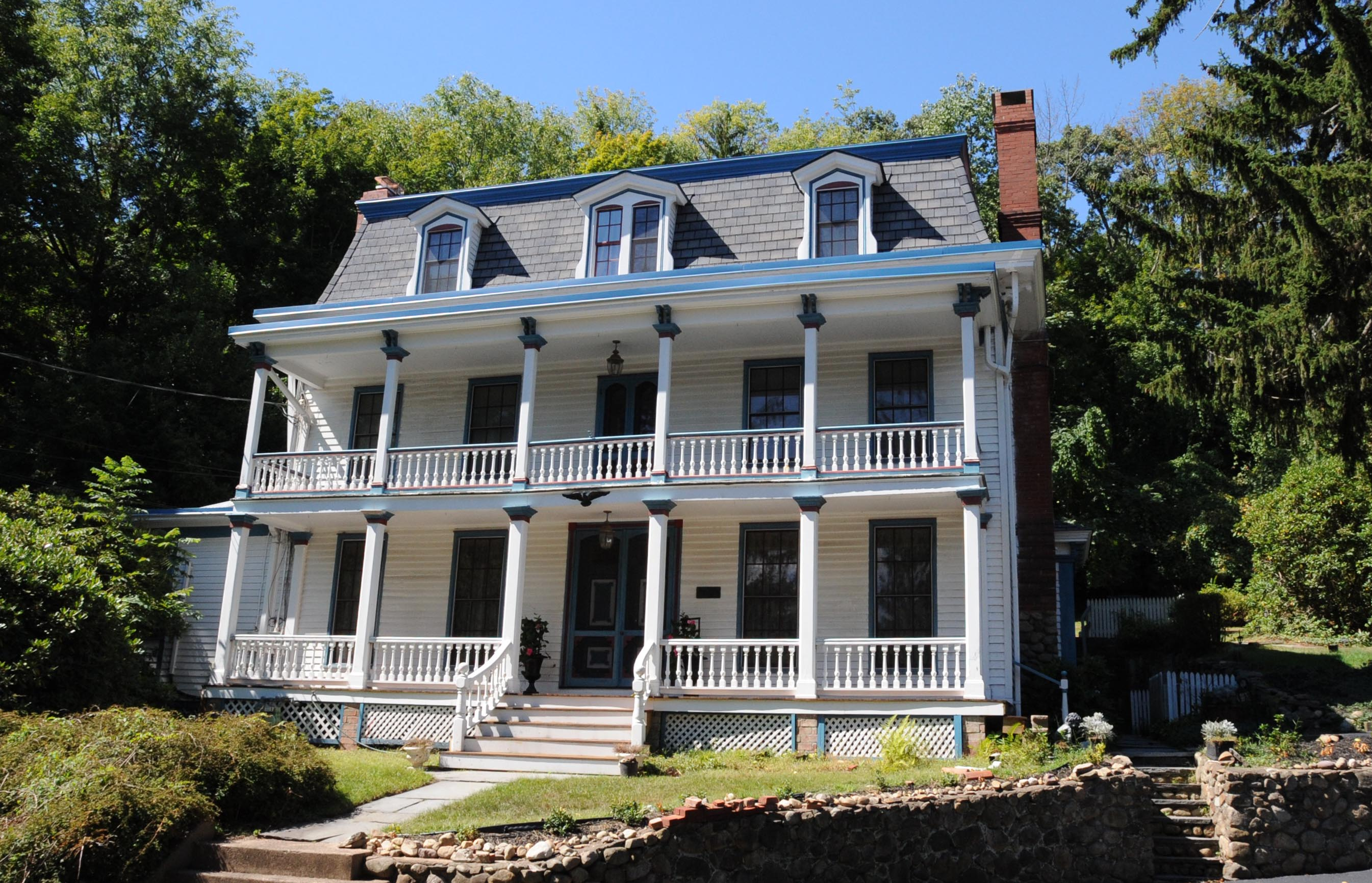

- Location within Bergen County, New Jersey Location within New Jersey Location within the United States
- Location: 214, 223, and 224 West Saddle River Road, Saddle River, New Jersey
- Coordinates: 41°2′42″N 74°6′10″W
- Area: 4 acres (1.6 ha)
- Built: 1865–1868
- Architectural style: Second Empire
- MPS: Saddle River MRA
- NRHP reference No.: 86001612
- NJRHP No.: 693

Significant dates
- Added to NRHP: August 29, 1986
- Designated NJRHP: June 13, 1986

The B. C. Wandell House, also known as The Cedars, is located at 214, 223, and 224 West Saddle River Road in the borough of Saddle River in Bergen County, New Jersey, United States. The historic house was built from 1865 to 1868 and was added to the National Register of Historic Places on August 29, 1986, for its significance in architecture. It was listed as part of the Saddle River Multiple Property Submission (MPS).

The house was built by Judge Benjamin Coe Wandell and features Second Empire architecture, such as the use of a mansard roof. The listing includes a large barn and a gazebo by the riverside. From 1919 to 1941, the property was used as a YWCA camp, called Shadyside Camp.

== See also ==
- National Register of Historic Places listings in Saddle River, New Jersey
- National Register of Historic Places listings in Bergen County, New Jersey
