= Saddle River, New Jersey =

Borough in Bergen County, New Jersey, US

- Borough
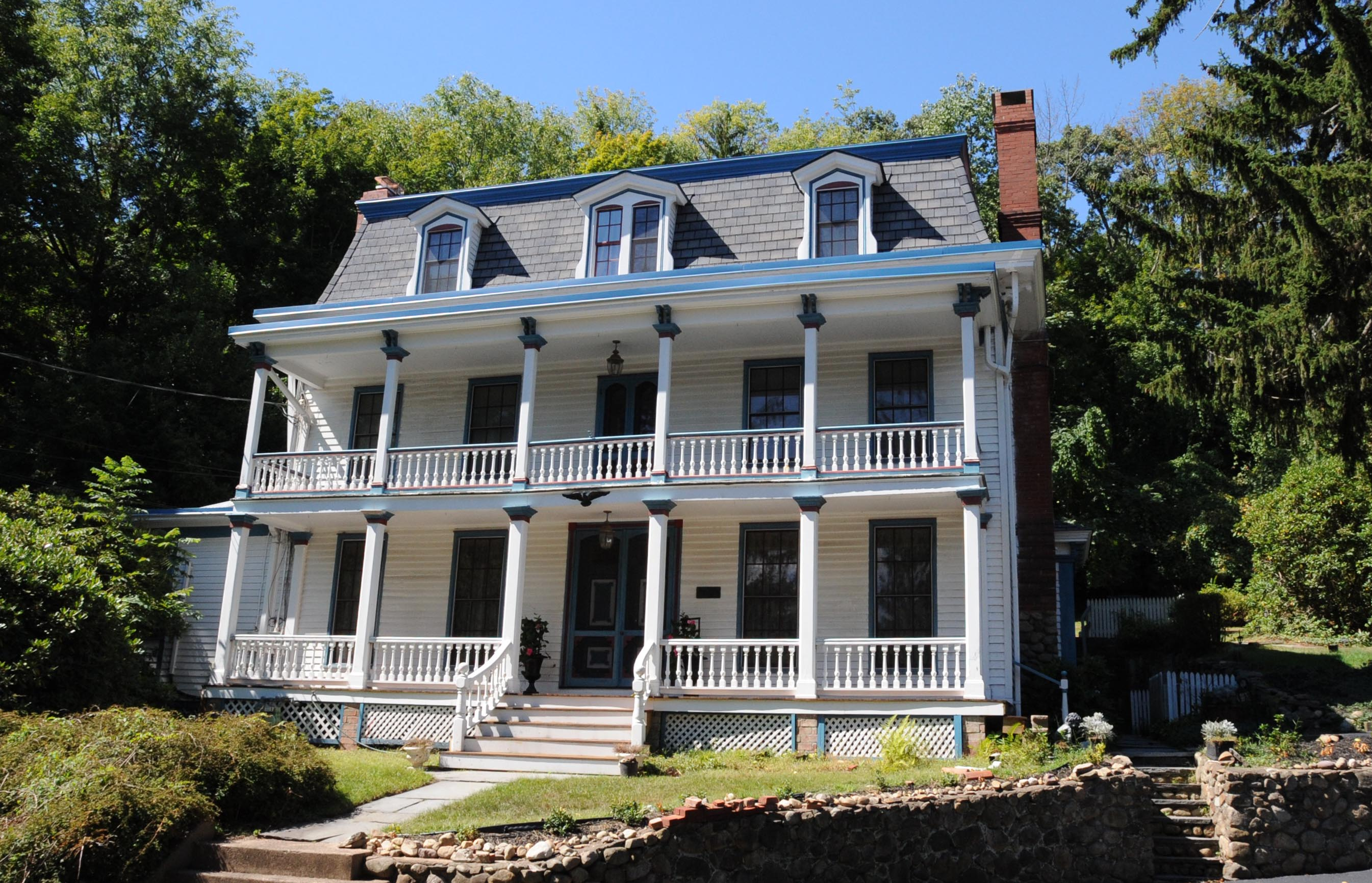
- B. C. Wandell House, listed on the National Register of Historic Places

- Seal

- Location of Saddle River in Bergen County highlighted in red (left). Inset map: Location of Bergen County in New Jersey highlighted in orange (right).

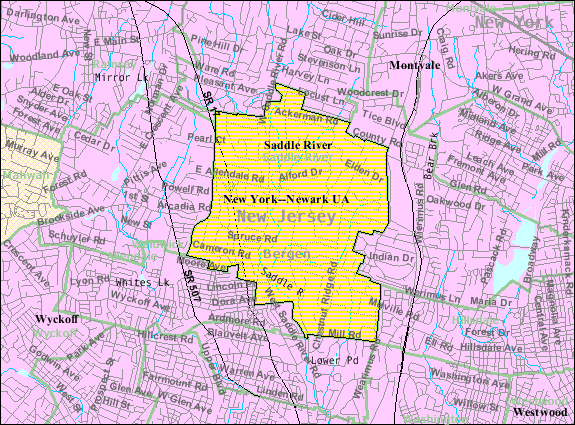
- Census Bureau map of Saddle River, New Jersey

- Location in Bergen County Location in New Jersey Location in the United States
- Coordinates: 41.023696°N 74.092553°W
- Country: United States
- State: New Jersey
- County: Bergen
- Incorporated: November 22, 1894
- Named for: The Saddle River

Government
  - Type: Borough
  - Body: Borough Council
  - Mayor: Albert J. Kurpis (R, term ends December 31, 2027)
  - Administrator: Richard Molinari
  - Municipal clerk: Cindy Kirkpatrick

Area
  - Total: 4.97 sq mi (12.86 km^{2})
  - Land: 4.92 sq mi (12.73 km^{2})
  - Water: 0.050 sq mi (0.13 km^{2}) 1.03%
  - Rank: 276th of 565 in state 13th of 70 in county
- Elevation: 184 ft (56 m)

Population (2020)
  - Total: 3,372
  - Estimate (2023): 3,368
  - Rank: 433rd of 565 in state 64th of 70 in county
  - Density: 686/sq mi (265/km^{2})
  - Rank: 422nd of 565 in state 67th of 70 in county
- Time zone: UTC−05:00 (Eastern (EST))
  - Summer (DST): UTC−04:00 (Eastern (EDT))
- ZIP Code: 07458
- Area code: 201
- FIPS code: 3400265400
- GNIS feature ID: 0885384
- Website: www.saddleriver.org

Saddle River is a borough in Bergen County, in the U.S. state of New Jersey. It is a suburb of New York City, located just over 25 miles (40 km) northwest of Manhattan. The town is known for its natural fields, farmland, horse farms, forests, and rivers, and has a bucolic atmosphere, due in part to a minimum zoning requirement of 2 acres (0.81 ha) for homes. The borough contains both stately historic homes and estates, as well as newer mansions. It offers many spacious properties in a countryside-like setting, while also having proximity to New York City.

Saddle River is one of the highest-income small municipalities in the United States and was ranked 9th in New Jersey in per capita income as of the 2010 Census. Saddle River was ranked among the Top 100 in Forbes Most Expensive Zip Codes in America in 2010. In 1989, Saddle River was ranked the richest suburb in the nation among those with 2,500 or more people (based on per capita income). The town has been home to notable residents including former US Presidents, celebrities, athletes, and businessmen (See Notable people list).

The New York Times described Saddle River as "a place where one can still keep horses—one per acre—see a deer, listen to the birds, and catch a fish in the trout stream that gives the town its name."

As of the 2020 United States census, the borough's population was 3,372, an increase of 220 (+7.0%) from the 2010 census count of 3,152, which in turn reflected a decline of 49 (−1.5%) from the 3,201 counted in the 2000 census.

Saddle River is a dry town, where alcohol cannot be sold.

== History ==
European settlement of the area that is now Saddle River traces back to 1675, when the Lenape Native Americans sold a stretch of land along the Saddle River to Albert Zabriskie. Saddle River was incorporated as a borough by an act of the New Jersey Legislature on November 22, 1894, from portions of Orvil Township, based on the results of a referendum held three days earlier. The borough was formed during the "Boroughitis" phenomenon then sweeping through Bergen County, in which 26 boroughs were formed in the county in 1894 alone. Saddle River's referendum passed on November 19, one day before the referendum passed for the formation of the neighboring borough of Upper Saddle River. Upper Saddle River and Saddle River share a zip code of 07458. An additional portion of Orvil Township was annexed in 1903.

The borough is named after the Saddle River, which flows through the borough and is a tributary of the Passaic River, which in turn was named for a stream and valley in Saddell, Argyll, Scotland.

=== Historic sites ===
Saddle River is home to the following locations on the National Register of Historic Places:

- Achenbach House – 184 Chestnut Ridge Road (added 1979, burned down in 2004)
- Ackerman House – 136 Chestnut Ridge Road (added 1983)
- Abram Ackerman House – 199 East Saddle River Road (added 1983)
- Garret and Maria Ackerman House – 150 East Saddle River Road (added 1986)
- Garret Augustus Ackerman House – 212 East Saddle River Road (added 1986)
- Ackerman–Dewsnap House – 176 East Saddle River Road (added 1986)
- Ackerman–Smith House – 171 East Allendale Road (added 1986)
- Ackerman–Dater House – 109 West Saddle River Road (added 1983)
- J. J. Carlock House – 2 Chestnut Ridge Road (added 1986)
- Evangelical Lutheran Church of Saddle River and Ramapough Building – 96 East Allendale Road (added 1986)
- Alonzo Foringer House and Studio – 107 and 107B East Saddle River Road (added 1986)
- Hopper House – 45 West Saddle River Road (added 1984)
- Joe Jefferson Clubhouse – 29 East Saddle River Road (added 1986)
- O'Blenis House – 220 East Saddle River Road (added 1986)
- Garret K. Osborn House and Barn – 88 and 90 East Allendale Road (added 1986)
- Dr. E. G. Roy House – 229 West Saddle River Road (added 1986)
- Saddle River Center Historic District – Along West Saddle River Road at jct. of East Allendale Road (added 1986)
- Stillwell–Preston House – 9 East Saddle River Road (added 1986)
- Andries Thomas Van Buskirk House – 164 East Saddle River Road (added 1983)
- Laurance Thomas Van Buskirk House – 116 East Saddle River Road (added 1983)
- B. C. Wandell House – 214, 223, and 224 West Saddle River Road (added 1986)
- F. L. Wandell Estate and Ward Factory Site – 255–261 East Saddle River Road (added 1990)
- Dr. John Christie Ware Bungalow – 246 East Saddle River Road (added 1986)

== Geography ==
According to the United States Census Bureau, the borough had a total area of 4.97 square miles (12.86 km^{2}), including 4.91 square miles (12.73 km^{2}) of land and 0.05 square miles (0.13 km^{2}) of water (1.03%).

The borough is bounded by eight municipalities in Bergen County: the boroughs of Allendale, Hillsdale, Ho-Ho-Kus, Ramsey, Upper Saddle River, Waldwick, Washington Township and Woodcliff Lake.

Mount Pleasant and Villa Marie Claire are unincorporated communities located within Saddle River.

=== Property values and taxes ===
The median home value in Saddle River was $1,960,294, compared to $596,000 for Bergen County, $440,000 for the state of NJ and $331,000 for the US overall, as of March 31, 2022.

Saddle River has a property tax rate of 1.021% which was the third-lowest property tax rate in Bergen County in 2023

== Demographics ==
Historical population
Census	Pop.	Note	%±
1900	415		—
1910	483		16.4%
1920	506		4.8%
1930	657		29.8%
1940	816		24.2%
1950	1,003		22.9%
1960	1,776		77.1%
1970	2,437		37.2%
1980	2,763		13.4%
1990	2,950		6.8%
2000	3,201		8.5%
2010	3,152		−1.5%
2020	3,372		7.0%
2023 (est.)	3,368	▼	−0.1%
Population sources: 1900–1920 1900–1910; 1910–1930 1900–2020; 2000 2010 2020

=== Racial and ethnic composition ===
Saddle River borough, New Jersey – Racial and ethnic composition Note: the US Census treats Hispanic/Latino as an ethnic category. This table excludes Latinos from the racial categories and assigns them to a separate category. Hispanics/Latinos may be of any race.
Race / Ethnicity (NH = Non-Hispanic)	Pop 2000	Pop 2010	Pop 2020	% 2000	% 2010	% 2020
White alone (NH)	2,811	2,570	2,550	87.82%	81.54%	75.62%
Black or African American alone (NH)	24	60	65	0.75%	1.90%	1.93%
Native American or Alaska Native alone (NH)	0	3	11	0.00%	0.10%	0.33%
Asian alone (NH)	229	291	451	7.15%	9.23%	13.37%
Native Hawaiian or Pacific Islander alone (NH)	0	2	2	0.00%	0.06%	0.06%
Other race alone (NH)	12	7	14	0.37%	0.22%	0.42%
Mixed race or Multiracial (NH)	43	57	98	1.34%	1.81%	2.91%
Hispanic or Latino (any race)	82	162	181	2.56%	5.14%	5.37%
Total	3,201	3,152	3,372	100.00%	100.00%	100.00%

=== 2020 census ===
As of the 2020 census, Saddle River had a population of 3,372. The median age was 53.5 years. 16.9% of residents were under the age of 18 and 30.7% were 65 years of age or older. For every 100 females there were 93.5 males, and for every 100 females age 18 and older there were 92.8 males age 18 and over.

100.0% of residents lived in urban areas, while 0.0% lived in rural areas.

There were 1,246 households, of which 24.7% had children under the age of 18 living in them. Of all households, 63.1% were married-couple households, 12.4% were households with a male householder and no spouse or partner present, and 22.2% were households with a female householder and no spouse or partner present. About 21.0% of all households were made up of individuals, and 14.9% had someone living alone who was 65 years of age or older.

There were 1,458 housing units, of which 14.5% were vacant. The homeowner vacancy rate was 3.6% and the rental vacancy rate was 31.4%.

=== 2010 census ===
The 2010 United States census counted 3,152 people, 1,216 households, and 894 families in the borough. The population density was 640.2 per square mile (247.2/km^{2}). There were 1,341 housing units at an average density of 272.4 per square mile (105.2/km^{2}). The racial makeup was 84.71% (2,670) White, 2.09% (66) Black or African American, 0.10% (3) Native American, 9.42% (297) Asian, 0.06% (2) Pacific Islander, 1.17% (37) from other races, and 2.44% (77) from two or more races. Hispanic or Latino of any race were 5.14% (162) of the population.

Of the 1,216 households, 27.1% had children under the age of 18; 65.5% were married couples living together; 5.5% had a female householder with no husband present and 26.5% were non-families. Of all households, 23.6% were made up of individuals and 15.7% had someone living alone who was 65 years of age or older. The average household size was 2.59 and the average family size was 3.08.

21.1% of the population were under the age of 18, 5.4% from 18 to 24, 14.1% from 25 to 44, 35.0% from 45 to 64, and 24.5% who were 65 years of age or older. The median age was 50.5 years. For every 100 females, the population had 89.8 males. For every 100 females ages 18 and older there were 86.9 males.

The Census Bureau's 2006–2010 American Community Survey showed that (in 2010 inflation-adjusted dollars) median household income was $97,197 (with a margin of error of +/− $48,774) and the median family income was $162,500 (+/− $61,174). Males had a median income of $162,740 (+/− $30,154) versus $56,339 (+/− $25,675) for females. The per capita income for the borough was $86,812 (+/− $16,562). About 0.9% of families and 1.3% of the population were below the poverty line, including 3.1% of those under age 18 and none of those age 65 or over.

Same-sex couples headed seven households in 2010, an increase from the six counted in 2000.

=== 2000 census ===
As of the 2000 United States census, there were 3,201 people, 1,118 households, and 926 families residing in the borough. The population density was 642.6 inhabitants per square mile (248.1/km^{2}). There were 1,183 housing units at an average density of 237.5 per square mile (91.7/km^{2}). The racial makeup of the borough was 89.85% White, 0.75% African American, 7.15% Asian, 0.03% Pacific Islander, 0.81% from other races, and 1.41% from two or more races. Hispanic or Latino of any race were 2.56% of the population.

There were 1,118 households, out of which 31.7% had children under the age of 18 living with them, 76.6% were married couples living together, 3.8% had a female householder with no husband present, and 17.1% were non-families. 14.2% of all households were made up of individuals, and 8.5% had someone living alone who was 65 years of age or older. The average household size was 2.77 and the average family size was 3.05.

In the borough, the age distribution of the population shows 22.5% under the age of 18, 4.7% from 18 to 24, 19.5% from 25 to 44, 32.9% from 45 to 64, and 20.4% who were 65 years of age or older. The median age was 47 years. For every 100 females, there were 92.8 males. For every 100 females age 18 and over, there were 93.0 males.

The median income for a household in the borough was $134,289, and the median income for a family was $152,169. Males had a median income of $100,000 versus $61,458 for females. The per capita income for the borough was $85,934. About 2.8% of families and 3.6% of the population were below the poverty line, including 2.4% of those under age 18 and 10.3% of those age 65 or over.

== Parks and recreation ==
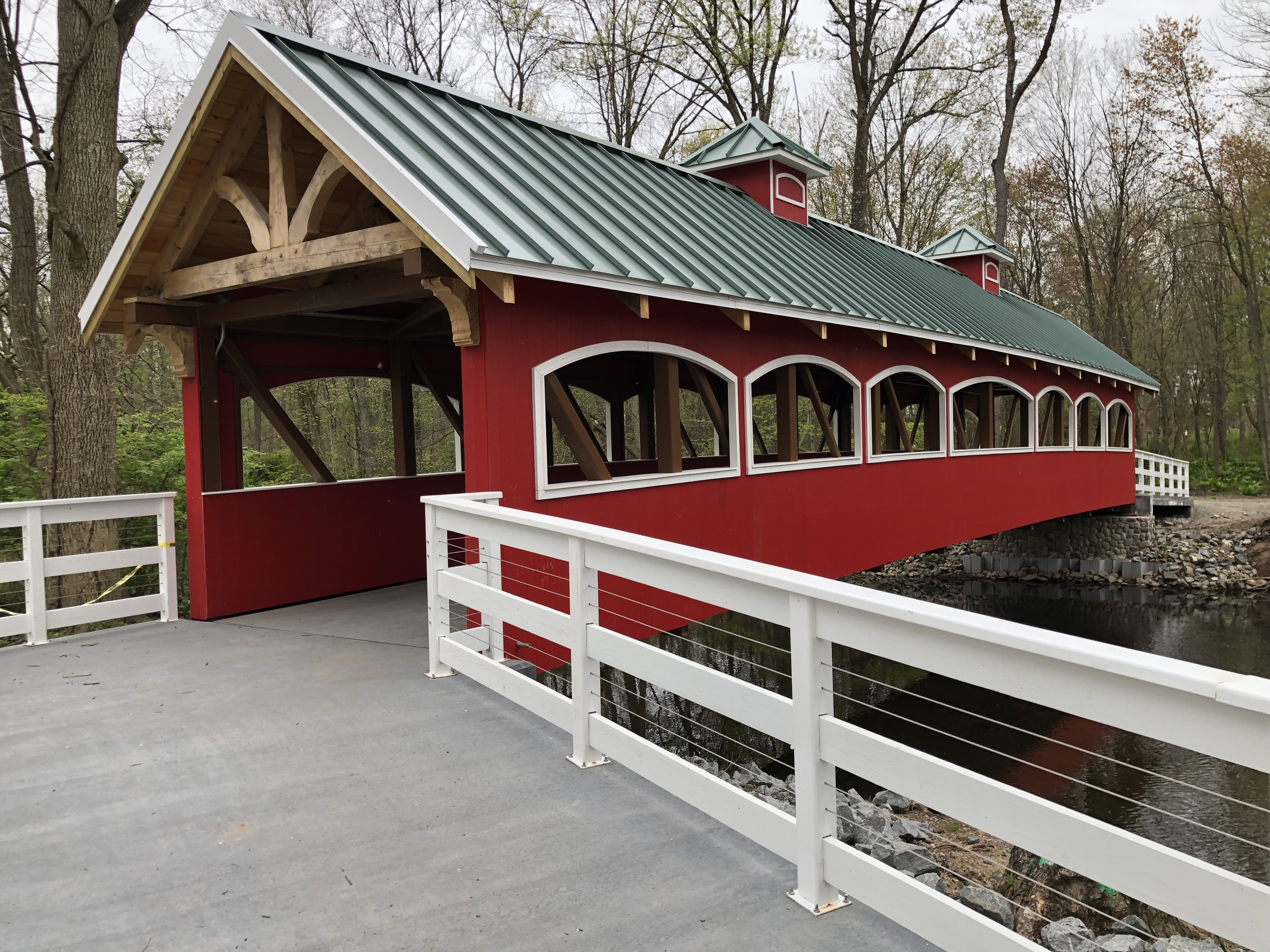
Saddle River Rindlaub Park Bridge Wins ASCE 2024 Award

In May 2024, the American Society of Civil Engineers recognized Saddle River with the 2024 Municipal Project Of The Year Award. The award was meant for developing Saddle River Rindlaub Park Pedestrian Bridge for its innovative design and for connecting the deadlocked land with the existing park for the good of the residents.

== Government ==
=== Local government ===
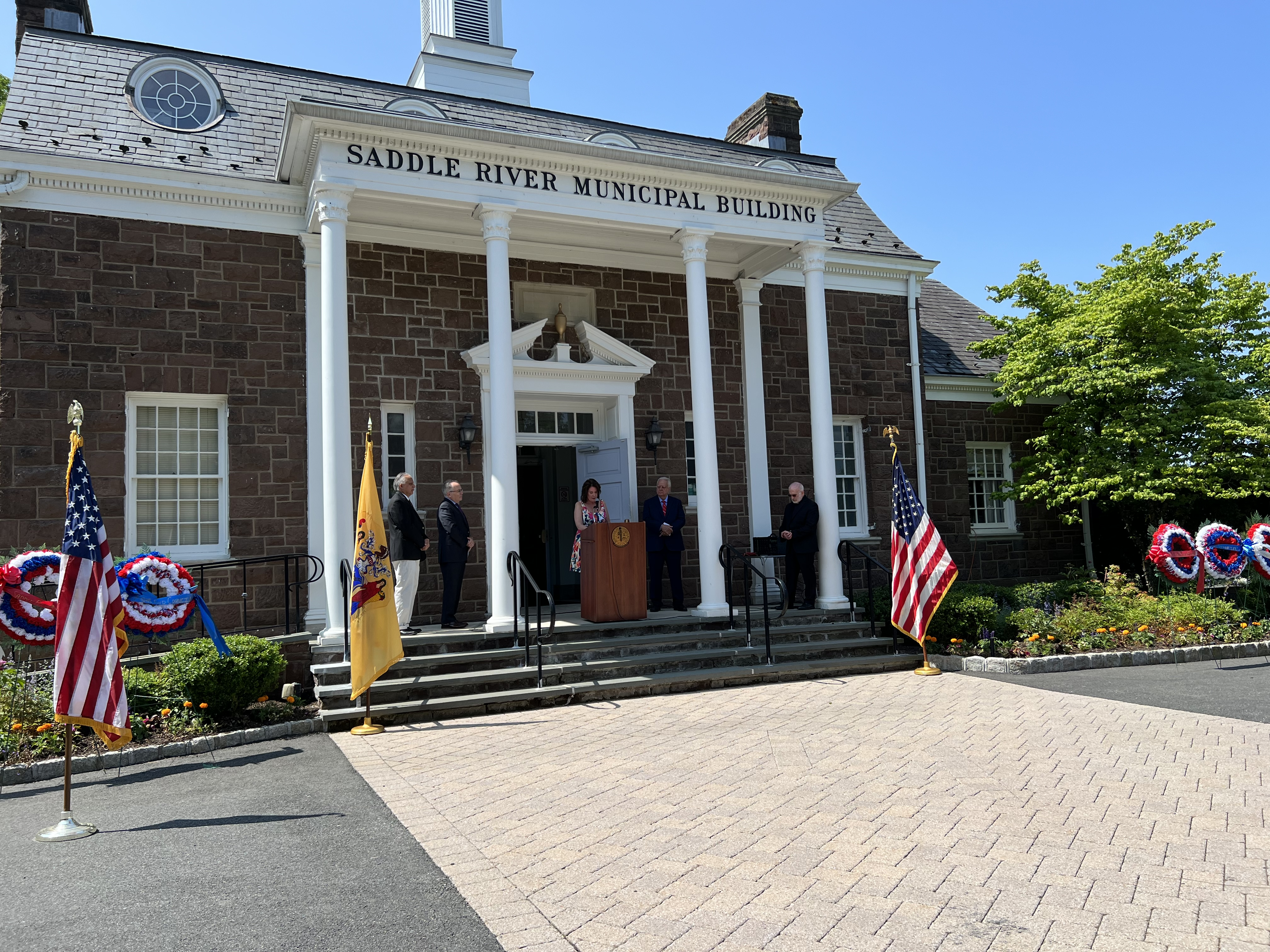
Saddle River Town Hall On Memorial Day 2023

Saddle River is governed under the borough form of New Jersey municipal government, which is used in 218 municipalities (of the 564) statewide, making it the most common form of government in New Jersey. The governing body is comprised of a mayor and a borough council, who are all elected on a partisan basis as part of the November general election. A mayor is elected directly by the voters to a four-year term. The borough council includes six members elected to serve three-year terms on a staggered basis, with two seats coming up for election each year in a three-year cycle. The borough form of government used by Saddle River is a "weak mayor / strong council" government in which council members act as the legislative body with the mayor presiding at meetings and voting only in the event of a tie. The mayor can veto ordinances subject to an override by a two-thirds majority vote of the council. The mayor makes committee and liaison assignments for council members, and most appointments are made by the mayor with the advice and consent of the council. The mayor serves as chief executive officer, and is an ex-officio member of all municipal committees and is the approving authority in the Borough of Saddle River. Mayoral appointments to the various boards and committees in the borough are subject to confirmation by the borough council. Borough council members serve on various operating committees and function in a liaison capacity to provide information and direction to the entire governing body.

As of 2024, the mayor is Republican Albert J. "Al" Kurpis, whose term of office ends December 31, 2027. Members of the Saddle River Borough Council are Council President David B. Hekemian (R, 2025), Duncan B. Carpenter (R, 2025), Christopher DiGirolamo (R, 2024), Jon Kurpis (R, 2026), Jeffrey S. Liva (R, 2024; elected to serve an unexpired term) and Ravi Sachdev (R, 2026).

In August 2022, the borough council appointed Jeffrey Liva to fill the seat expiring in December 2024 that had been held by Rosario Ruffino until he resigned from office earlier that month in protest over the cost of a park project. Liva served on an interim basis until the November 2022 general election, when he was elected to serve the remainder of the term of office.

John Azzariti and Ravi Sachdev were sworn in to three-year terms by Mayor Albert Kurpis during a combined in-person/remote session in January 2021. Azzariti had been appointed to the council the previous July after Councilman John DeRosa resigned for professional reasons. However, Azzariti chose to run with Sachdev for two open three-year terms, seats previously held by Paul Schulstad—who resigned in March 2020—and Eric Jensen, who did not seek a new term. Christopher DiGirolamo was elected to serve the one year remaining on DeRosa's term of office.

In March 2020, the borough council appointed Christopher T. DiGirolamo to fill the seat expiring in December 2020 that was vacated by Paul Schulstad when he resigned from office earlier that month.

=== Federal, state and county representation ===
Saddle River is located in the 5th Congressional District and is part of New Jersey's 39th state legislative district.

For the 119th United States Congress, New Jersey's 5th congressional district is represented by Josh Gottheimer (D, Wyckoff). New Jersey is represented in the United States Senate by Democrats Cory Booker (Newark, term ends 2027) and Andy Kim (Moorestown, term ends 2031).

For the 2026–2027 session, the 39th legislative district of the New Jersey Legislature is represented in the State Senate by Holly Schepisi (R, River Vale) and in the General Assembly by Robert Auth (R, Old Tappan) and John V. Azzariti (R, Saddle River).

Bergen County is governed by a directly elected County Executive, with legislative functions performed by a Board of County Commissioners comprised of seven members who are elected at-large to three-year terms in partisan elections on a staggered basis, with either two or three seats coming up for election each November; a Chairman and Vice Chairman are selected from among its seven members at a reorganization meeting held every January. As of 2025, the county executive is James J. Tedesco III (D, Paramus), whose four-year term of office ends December 31, 2026.

Bergen County's Commissioners are Chair Mary J. Amoroso (D, Mahwah, 2025), Vice Chair Steven A. Tanelli (D, North Arlington, 2027), Chair Pro Tem Joan Voss (D, Fort Lee, 2026), Rafael Marte (D, Bergenfield, 2026), Germaine M. Ortiz (D, Emerson, 2025), Thomas J. Sullivan Jr. (D, Montvale, 2025) and Tracy Silna Zur (D, Franklin Lakes, 2027).

Bergen County's elected constitutional officials are Clerk John S. Hogan (D, Northvale, 2026), Sheriff Anthony Cureton (D, Englewood, 2027) and Surrogate Michael R. Dressler (D, Cresskill, 2026).

=== Politics ===
Presidential election results

United States presidential election results for Saddle River
Year	Republican		Democratic		Third party(ies)	
Year	No.	%	No.	%	No.	%
2024	1,370	63.93%	695	32.43%	78	3.64%
2020	1,427	61.48%	868	37.40%	26	1.12%
2016	1,247	64.75%	611	31.72%	68	3.53%
2012	1,268	72.87%	448	25.75%	24	1.38%
2008	1,253	66.65%	598	31.81%	29	1.54%
2004	1,279	68.91%	566	30.50%	11	0.59%
2000	1,262	73.24%	430	24.96%	31	1.80%
1996	1,178	72.31%	343	21.06%	108	6.63%
1992	1,234	70.15%	333	18.93%	192	10.92%
1988	1,404	81.25%	314	18.17%	10	0.58%
1984	1,404	83.57%	274	16.31%	2	0.12%
1980	1,251	76.51%	228	13.94%	156	9.54%
1976	1,186	78.65%	303	20.09%	19	1.26%
1972	1,225	81.67%	268	17.87%	7	0.47%
1968	1,068	79.11%	245	18.15%	37	2.74%
1964	735	64.30%	405	35.43%	3	0.26%
1960	878	83.70%	169	16.11%	2	0.19%
1956	745	92.66%	59	7.34%	0	0.00%
1952	605	91.81%	54	8.19%	0	0.00%
1948	427	88.04%	57	11.75%	1	0.21%
1944	373	82.52%	79	17.48%	0	0.00%
1940	399	83.30%	80	16.70%	0	0.00%
1936	309	76.49%	95	23.51%	0	0.00%
1932	259	73.16%	95	26.84%	0	0.00%
1928	260	81.25%	60	18.75%	0	0.00%
1924	179	84.43%	33	15.57%	0	0.00%
1920	147	78.61%	40	21.39%	0	0.00%
1916	65	67.01%	32	32.99%	0	0.00%
1912	16	19.05%	28	33.33%	40	47.62%

Please note that election results from 1928 to 1956 were obtained from newspaper clippings and may not be official. Third parties were not listed for Saddle River in most of those articles. As of March 2011, there were a total of 2,387 registered voters in Saddle River, of which 286 (12.0% vs. 31.7% countywide) were registered as Democrats, 1,211 (50.7% vs. 21.1%) were registered as Republicans and 889 (37.2% vs. 47.1%) were registered as Unaffiliated. There was one voter registered to another party. Among the borough's 2010 Census population, 75.7% (vs. 57.1% in Bergen County) were registered to vote, including 96.0% of those ages 18 and over (vs. 73.7% countywide).

Gubernatorial election results for Saddle River
Year	Republican		Democratic		Third party(ies)	
Year	No.	%	No.	%	No.	%
2025	1,133	68.92%	507	30.84%	4	0.24%
2021	1,097	71.14%	444	28.79%	1	0.06%
2017	676	74.61%	220	24.28%	10	1.10%
2013	845	84.67%	143	14.33%	10	1.00%
2009	968	74.98%	283	21.92%	40	3.10%
2005	856	73.54%	301	25.86%	7	0.60%

In the 2013 gubernatorial election, Republican Chris Christie received 84.7% of the vote (845 cast), ahead of Democrat Barbara Buono with 14.3% (143 votes), and other candidates with 1.0% (10 votes), among the 1,032 ballots cast by the borough's 2,475 registered voters (34 ballots were spoiled), for a turnout of 41.7%. In the 2009 gubernatorial election, Republican Chris Christie received 968 votes here (74.4% vs. 45.8% countywide), ahead of Democrat Jon Corzine with 283 votes (21.8% vs. 48.0%), Independent Chris Daggett with 39 votes (3.0% vs. 4.7%) and other candidates with one vote (0.1% vs. 0.5%), among the 1,301 ballots cast by the borough's 2,436 registered voters, yielding a 53.4% turnout (vs. 50.0% in the county).

United States Senate election results for Saddle River1
Year	Republican		Democratic		Third party(ies)	
Year	No.	%	No.	%	No.	%
2024	1,349	65.90%	650	31.75%	48	2.34%
2018	970	72.33%	349	26.03%	22	1.64%
2012	1,189	72.10%	447	27.11%	13	0.79%
2006	997	71.99%	375	27.08%	13	0.94%

United States Senate election results for Saddle River2
Year	Republican		Democratic		Third party(ies)	
Year	No.	%	No.	%	No.	%
2020	1,450	63.76%	803	35.31%	21	0.92%
2014	811	72.22%	301	26.80%	11	0.98%
2013	521	70.88%	212	28.84%	2	0.27%
2008	1,219	69.38%	518	29.48%	20	1.14%

== Education ==
The Saddle River School District serves students in pre-kindergarten through fifth grade at Wandell School. As of the 2024–25 school year, the district, comprised of one school, had an enrollment of 125 students and 14.7 classroom teachers (on an FTE basis), for a student–teacher ratio of 8.5:1. In the 2016–17 school year, Saddle River was tied for the 28th-smallest enrollment of any school district in the state, with 150 students. Public school students from Saddle River attend the Ramsey Public School District's middle school and then have the option of attending either Ramsey High School or Northern Highlands Regional High School as part of sending/receiving relationships with each of the respective districts. As of the 2024–25 school year, the Northern Highlands Regional High School had an enrollment of 1,257 students and 109.7 classroom teachers (on an FTE basis), for a student–teacher ratio of 11.5:1, while Ramsey High School had an enrollment of 739 students and 77.8 classroom teachers (on an FTE basis), for a student–teacher ratio of 9.5:1. One of under ten districts in the state with a dual send-receive relationship, three quarters of Saddle River's high school students attend Northern Highlands and about a quarter attend Ramsey High School.

All students in 8th grade from the borough, and all of Bergen County, are eligible to attend the secondary education programs offered by the Bergen County Technical Schools, which include the Bergen County Academies in Hackensack, and the Bergen Tech campus in Teterboro or Paramus. The district offers programs on a shared-time or full-time basis, with admission based on a selective application process and tuition covered by the student's home school district.

Saddle River Day School is a K–12 private school that was founded in 1957.

== Transportation ==
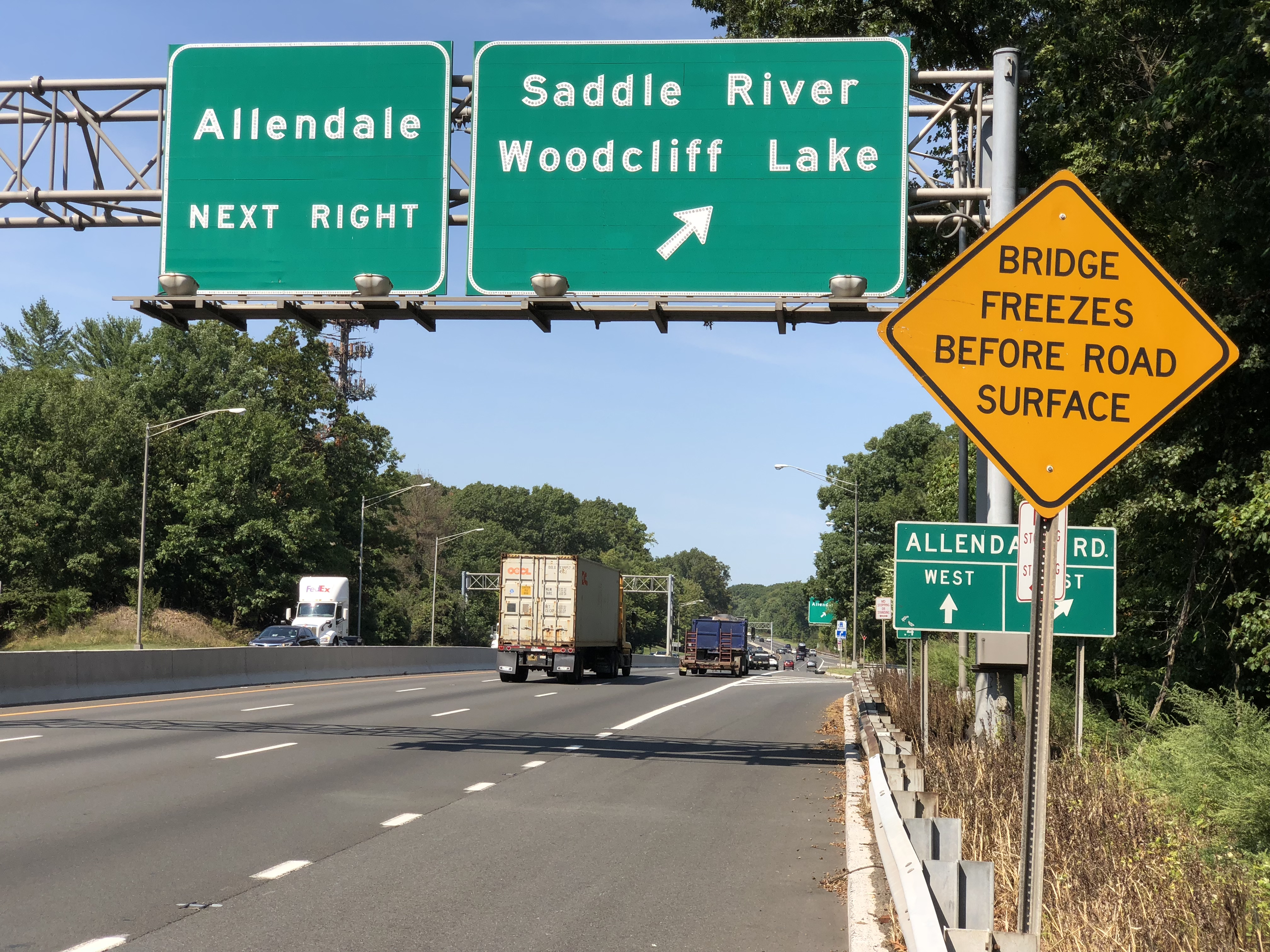
Route 17 northbound in Saddle River

As of May 2010, the borough had a total of 39.23 miles (63.13 km) of roadways, of which 26.40 miles (42.49 km) were maintained by the municipality, 10.88 miles (17.51 km) by Bergen County and 1.95 miles (3.14 km) by the New Jersey Department of Transportation.

Route 17 passes through Saddle River. Other main roads include West Saddle River Road, East Saddle River Road, Allendale Road and Chestnut Ridge Road.

Saddle River is served mainly by Route 17, which runs directly through the borough, but certain portions are served by locations in Ho-Ho-Kus, Waldwick, Upper Saddle River and Allendale. The Garden State Parkway is within a short distance of the borough at exit 171 in Woodcliff Lake.

== Notable people ==
People who were born in, residents of, or otherwise closely associated with Saddle River include:

- Francis W. H. Adams (1904–1990), lawyer who served as New York City Police Commissioner from 1954 to 1955
- Danny Aiello (1933–2019), actor
- John V. Azzariti (born 1966), physician and politician who has served in the New Jersey General Assembly since 2024
- Gary Bettman (born 1952), Commissioner of the National Hockey League
- Mary J. Blige (born 1971), recording artist and Grammy winner
- Larry Blyden (1925–1975), actor
- Jim Burt (born 1959), former NFL player
- Tim Cahill (born 1979), former soccer player
- Nick Cannon (born 1980), actor, producer, rapper and entrepreneur
- Vince Carter (born 1977), formerly of the New Jersey Nets
- Andrew Dice Clay (born 1957), actor and comedian
- Vince Colletta (1923–1991), comic book artist
- Rocco B. Commisso (born 1949), billionaire, founder of Mediacom
- Vincent Curatola (born 1953), actor known for his role playing Johnny Sack on the television series The Sopranos
- James P. Dugan (1929–2021), former member of the New Jersey Senate who served as chairman of the New Jersey Democratic State Committee
- Alonzo Foringer (1878–1948), painter best known for his World War I Red Cross promotional poster, "The Greatest Mother in the World"
- Carol Haney (1924–1964), actress
- Mary Higgins Clark (1927–2020), author of suspense novels
- Wil Horneff (born 1979), actor
- Mark Jackson, (born 1965), former NBA player and former head coach for the Golden State Warriors
- Wyclef Jean (born 1969), three-time Grammy Award-winning rapper, singer-songwriter, musician, record producer and politician
- A. J. Khubani (born 1959), telemarketer and founder of Telebrands
- Jason Kidd (born 1973), former player and current head coach of the Dallas Mavericks
- Joumana Kidd (born 1972), actress and journalist who is the former wife of Jason Kidd
- Andrew Kissel (1959–2006), murdered real estate developer
- Mariusz Kolodziej (born 1966), boxing promoter and entrepreneur
- David Lat (born 1975), blogger
- Judy Nicastro, politician who served from 2000 to 2004 as a member of the Seattle City Council
- Richard Nixon (1913–1994), United States President, and First Lady Pat Nixon (1912–1993), who lived there from 1981 to 1991
- Jeffrey Nordling (born 1962), actor who appeared in the series Dirt
- Rosie O'Donnell (born 1962), comedian and television personality, homeowner since 2013
- Charles Osgood (1933–2024), radio and television commentator, writer and musician
- Kenneth Pasternak (born 1954), businessman, entrepreneur
- Caroline Pennell (born 1995), singer-songwriter who was a contestant on the fifth season of The Voice
- Mario Perillo (1927–2003), tour operator
- Eleanore Pettersen (1916–2003), one of the first female architects in New Jersey
- Sam Raia, politician who served as Mayor of Saddle River and former Chairman of the New Jersey Republican State Committee
- Ja Rule (born 1976), rapper
- Lisa Scafuro (born 1958), documentary film maker and children's book author born in Saddle River who still resides part of the year
- Danielle Schulmann (born 1989), soccer player who plays as a forward for Sky Blue FC in the NWSL
- Daniel Silna (born 1944), co-owner of the former ABA team the Spirits of St. Louis who has profited from TV revenue earned as part of the deal in which four ABA teams were merged into the NBA
- Joseph Simmons (born 1964), a.k.a. Reverend Run, the "Run" in Run-D.M.C. and star of his family's reality show Run's House
- Russell Simmons (born 1957), godfather of hip-hop, whose house has been up for sale following his divorce from Kimora Lee Simmons
- Thomas Turino (born 1951), ethnomusicologist and author of several textbooks in the field
- Ben Vereen (born 1946), Tony Award-winning actor, dancer and singer
- William B. Widnall (1906–1983), politician who served as a member of the United States House of Representatives for 24 years representing New Jersey's 7th congressional district
- Susie Wiles (born 1957), political consultant who was selected by Donald Trump to serve as the 32nd White House chief of staff in his second administration

== See also ==
- National Register of Historic Places listings in Saddle River, New Jersey

== Sources ==
- Municipal Incorporations of the State of New Jersey (according to Counties) prepared by the Division of Local Government, Department of the Treasury (New Jersey); December 1, 1958.
- Clayton, W. Woodford; and Nelson, William. History of Bergen and Passaic Counties, New Jersey, with Biographical Sketches of Many of its Pioneers and Prominent Men, Philadelphia: Everts and Peck, 1882.
- Harvey, Cornelius Burnham (ed.), Genealogical History of Hudson and Bergen Counties, New Jersey. New York: New Jersey Genealogical Publishing Co., 1900.
- Van Valen, James M. History of Bergen County, New Jersey. New York: New Jersey Publishing and Engraving Co., 1900.
- Westervelt, Frances A. (Frances Augusta), 1858–1942, History of Bergen County, New Jersey, 1630–1923, Lewis Historical Publishing Company, 1923.
