= Andries Thomas Van Buskirk House =

Historic house in New Jersey, United States

- U.S. National Register of Historic Places
- New Jersey Register of Historic Places
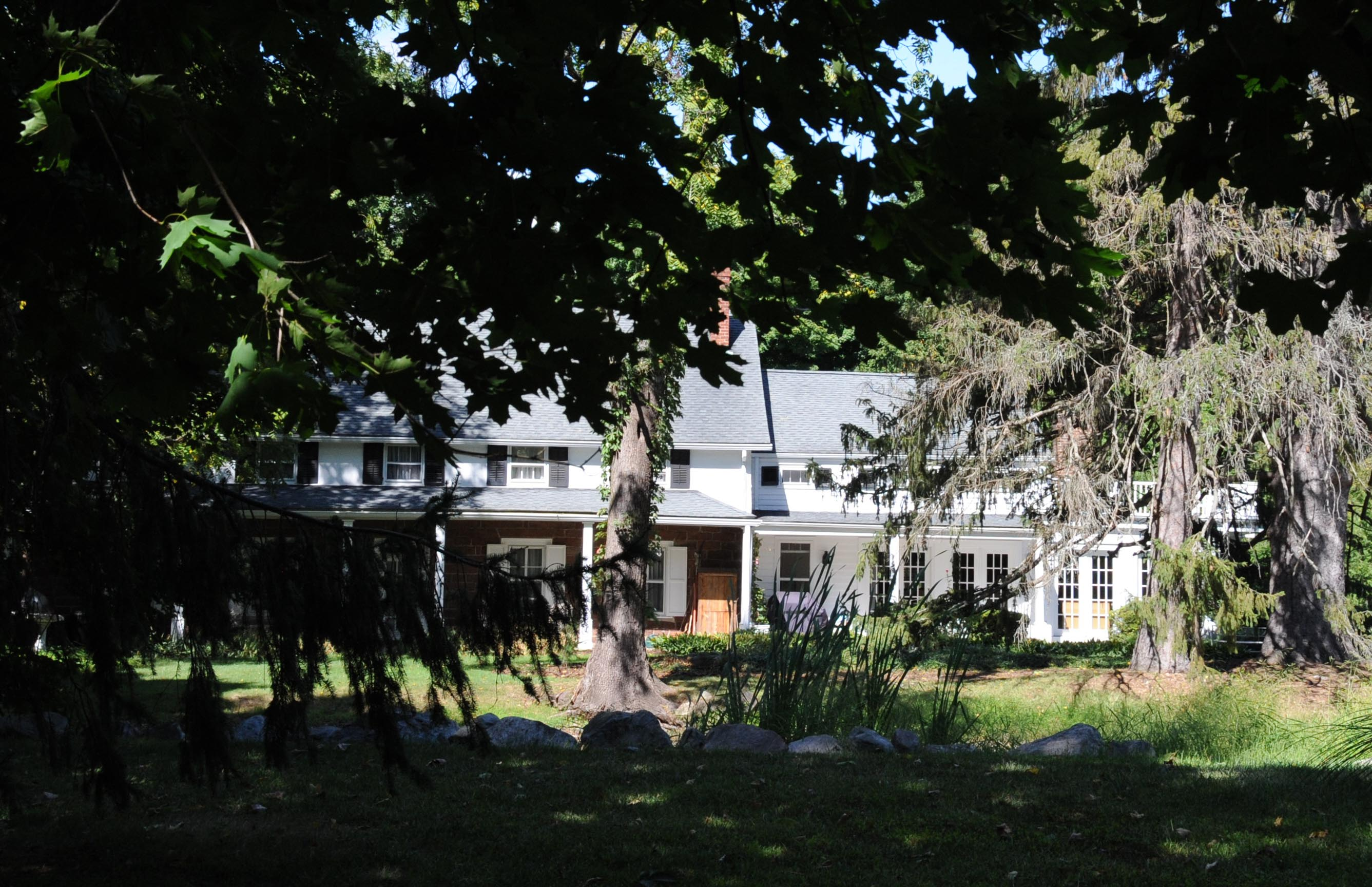

- Location within Bergen County, New Jersey Location within New Jersey Location within the United States
- Location: 164 East Saddle River Road, Saddle River, New Jersey
- Coordinates: 41°1′16″N 74°5′43″W
- Area: 4.5 acres (1.8 ha)
- Built: c. 1725–1730, c. 1770
- Built by: Andries Thomas Van Buskirk
- MPS: Stone Houses of Bergen County TR; Saddle River MRA
- NRHP reference No.: 83001559
- NJRHP No.: 691

Significant dates
- Added to NRHP: January 10, 1983
- Designated NJRHP: October 3, 1980

The Andries Thomas Van Buskirk House is a historic stone house located at 164 East Saddle River Road in the borough of Saddle River in Bergen County, New Jersey, United States. The oldest part of the house was built around 1725–1730 and expanded around 1770. It was documented by the Historic American Buildings Survey (HABS) in 1937. The house was added to the National Register of Historic Places on January 10, 1983, for its significance in architecture and exploration/settlement. It was listed as part of the Early Stone Houses of Bergen County Multiple Property Submission (MPS) and the Saddle River MPS.

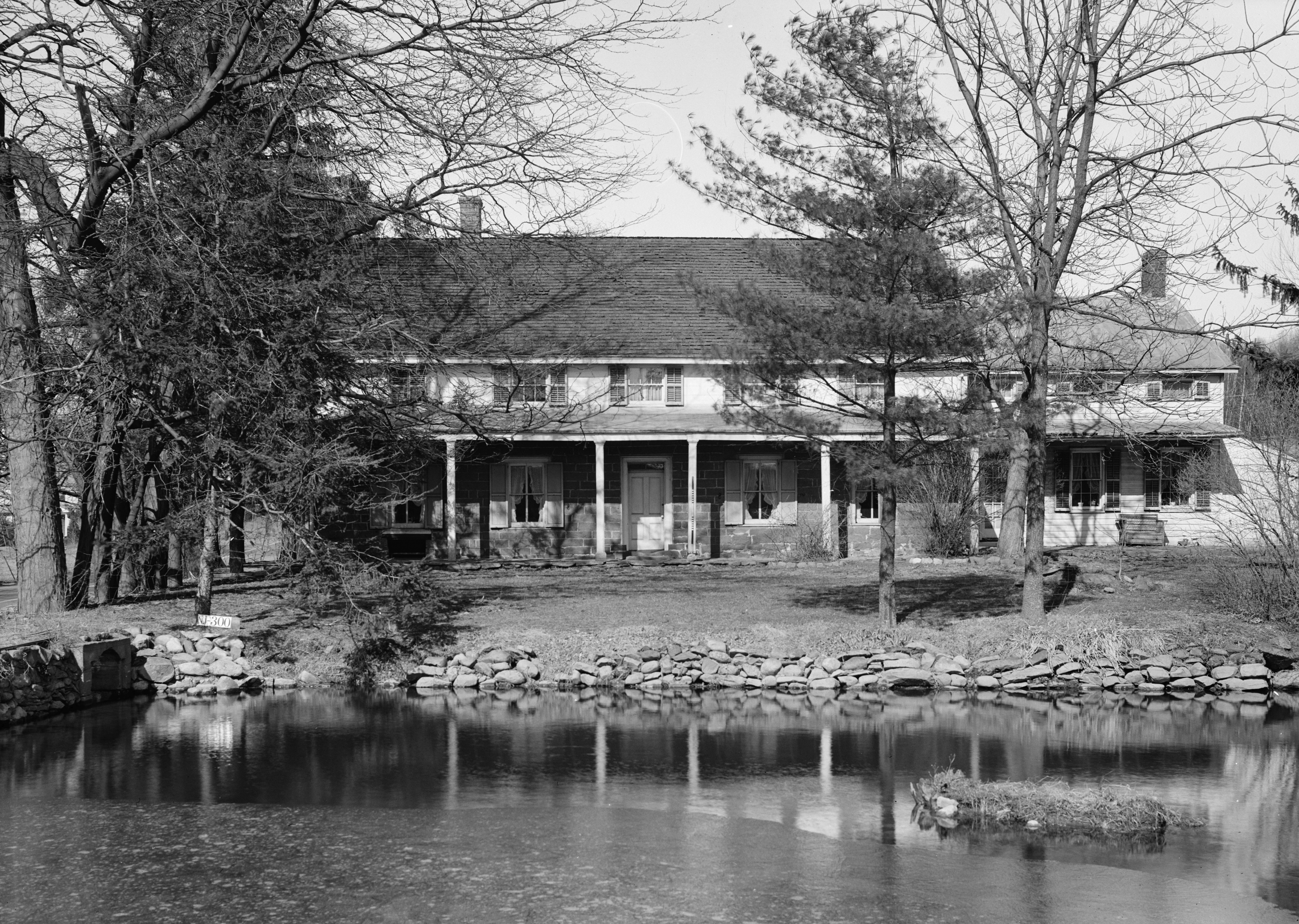
HABS photo from 1937

== See also ==
- National Register of Historic Places listings in Saddle River, New Jersey
- National Register of Historic Places listings in Bergen County, New Jersey
