= Yereance-Kettel house =

Yereance–Kettel House
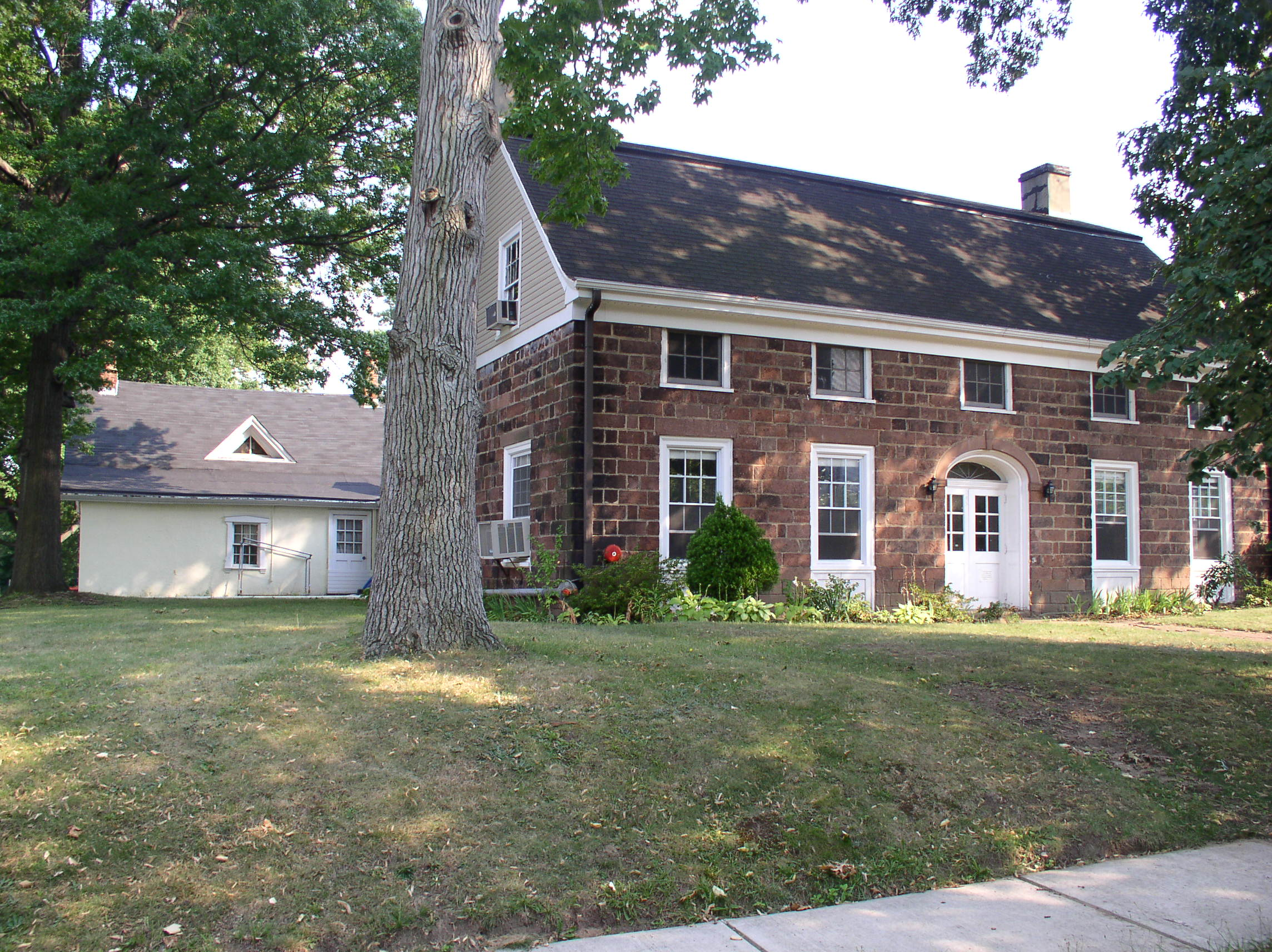
- Ackerman House is in the foreground and the Yereance-Kettel House is in the background
- Interactive map of the Yereance–Kettel House area

General information
- Type: House
- Architectural style: Late Colonial
- Location: 245 Union Avenue, Rutherford, New Jersey
- Coordinates: 40.834091°N 74.11086°W
- Construction started: 1810–1820
- Governing body: Private

Website

New Jersey Register of Historic Places
- Official name: Yereance–Kettel House
- Designated: October 3, 1980
- Reference no.: 671

The Yereance–Kettel House is located in Rutherford, New Jersey. The homestead was nominated for the National Register of Historic Places and determined eligible on January 10, 1983, but was not listed due to owner objection. It is, however, listed on the New Jersey Register of Historic Places.

== History ==
The home was built by Hesel Yereance around 1810 on land deeded to him by his father, Christopher Yereance, in 1798. The home was purchased by George E. Woodward in 1866. Woodward remodeled the home in 1870 and sold it to the Kettel family in 1876. The Kettel family sold the home to Fairleigh Dickinson University in 1955, which maintained a Rutherford campus until 1997. Another house from East Rutherford known as the Ackerman–Outwater House was moved to the property and attached to the Yereance–Kettel House by 1957.
