= Ackerman–Dewsnap House =

Historic house in New Jersey, United States

- U.S. National Register of Historic Places
- New Jersey Register of Historic Places
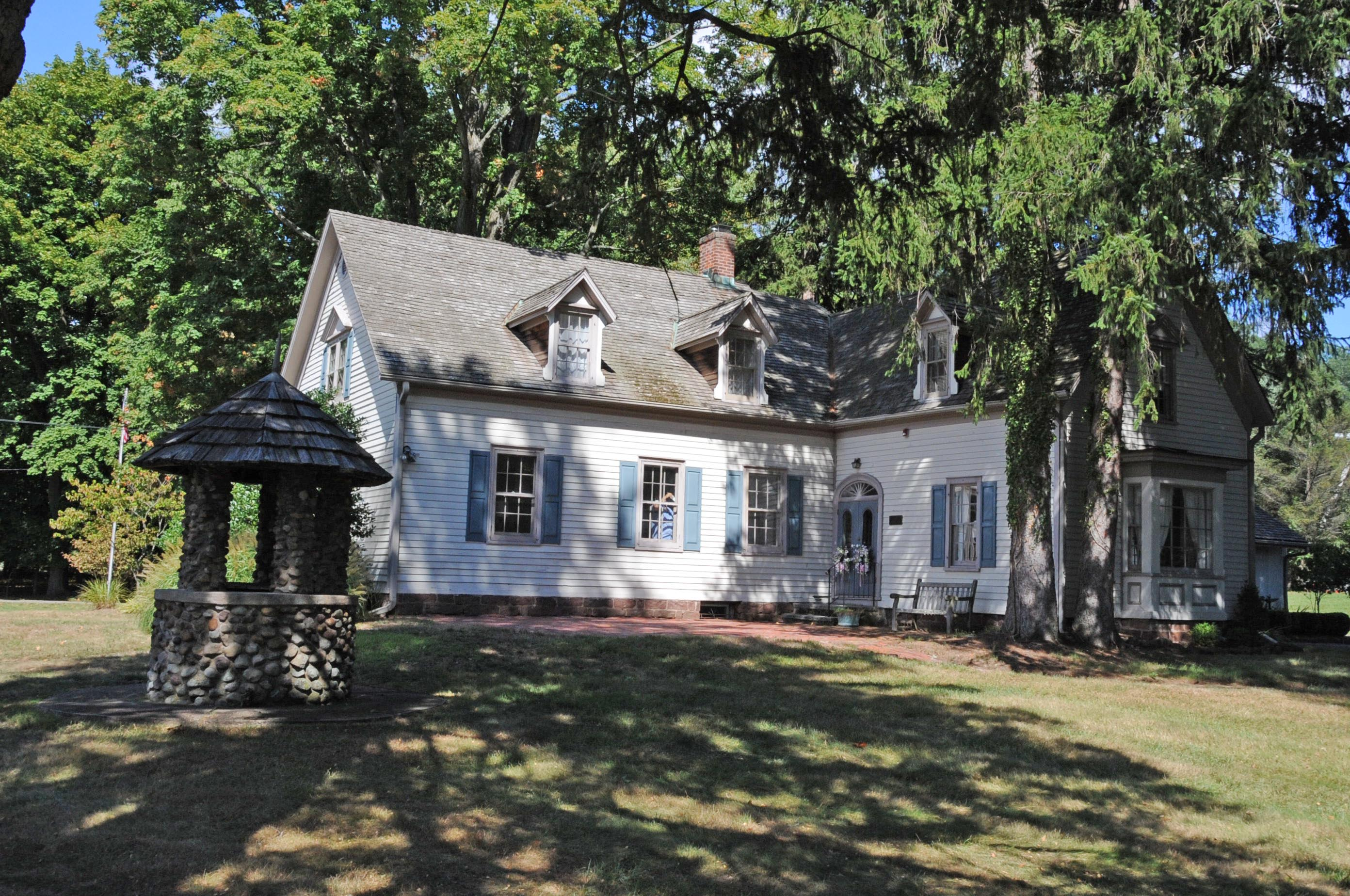

- Location within Bergen County, New Jersey Location within New Jersey Location within the United States
- Location: 176 East Saddle River Road, Saddle River, New Jersey
- Coordinates: 40°45′46″N 74°6′11″W
- Area: 5.2 acres (2.1 ha)
- Built: c. 1835
- MPS: Saddle River MRA
- NRHP reference No.: 86001599
- NJRHP No.: 676

Significant dates
- Added to NRHP: August 29, 1986
- Designated NJRHP: June 13, 1986

The Ackerman–Dewsnap House is located at 176 East Saddle River Road in the borough of Saddle River in Bergen County, New Jersey, United States. The historic house was built around 1835 and added to the National Register of Historic Places on August 29, 1986, for its significance in architecture. It was listed as part of the Saddle River Multiple Property Submission (MPS).

According to the nomination form, Ackerman sold the property to James Dewsnap in 1864. He remodeled the house around 1870. The borough now owns the property.

== See also ==
- National Register of Historic Places listings in Saddle River, New Jersey
- National Register of Historic Places listings in Bergen County, New Jersey
