= Garret Augustus Ackerman House =

Historic house in New Jersey, United States

- U.S. National Register of Historic Places
- New Jersey Register of Historic Places
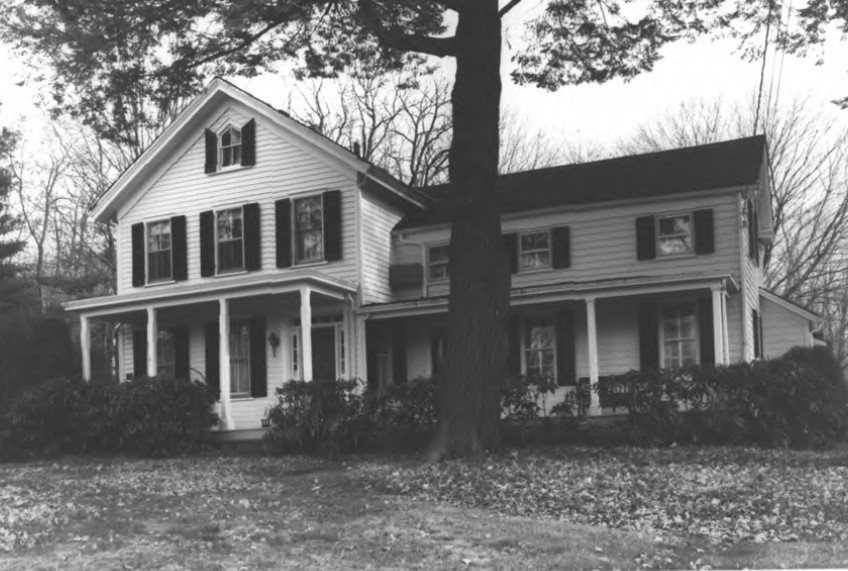
- c. 1986 photo

- Location within Bergen County, New Jersey Location within New Jersey Location within the United States
- Location: 212 East Saddle River Road, Saddle River, New Jersey
- Coordinates: 41°2′16″N 74°6′3″W
- Area: 2.3 acres (0.93 ha)
- Built: 1832
- MPS: Saddle River MRA
- NRHP reference No.: 86001597
- NJRHP No.: 677

Significant dates
- Added to NRHP: August 29, 1986
- Designated NJRHP: June 13, 1986

The Garret Augustus Ackerman House is located at 212 East Saddle River Road in the borough of Saddle River in Bergen County, New Jersey, United States. The historic house was built in 1832 and was added to the National Register of Historic Places on August 29, 1986, for its significance in architecture. It was listed as part of the Saddle River Multiple Property Submission (MPS). The house was demolished in the late 1980s.

== See also ==
- National Register of Historic Places listings in Saddle River, New Jersey
- National Register of Historic Places listings in Bergen County, New Jersey
