= Garret K. Osborn House and Barn =

Historic house in New Jersey, United States

- U.S. National Register of Historic Places
- New Jersey Register of Historic Places
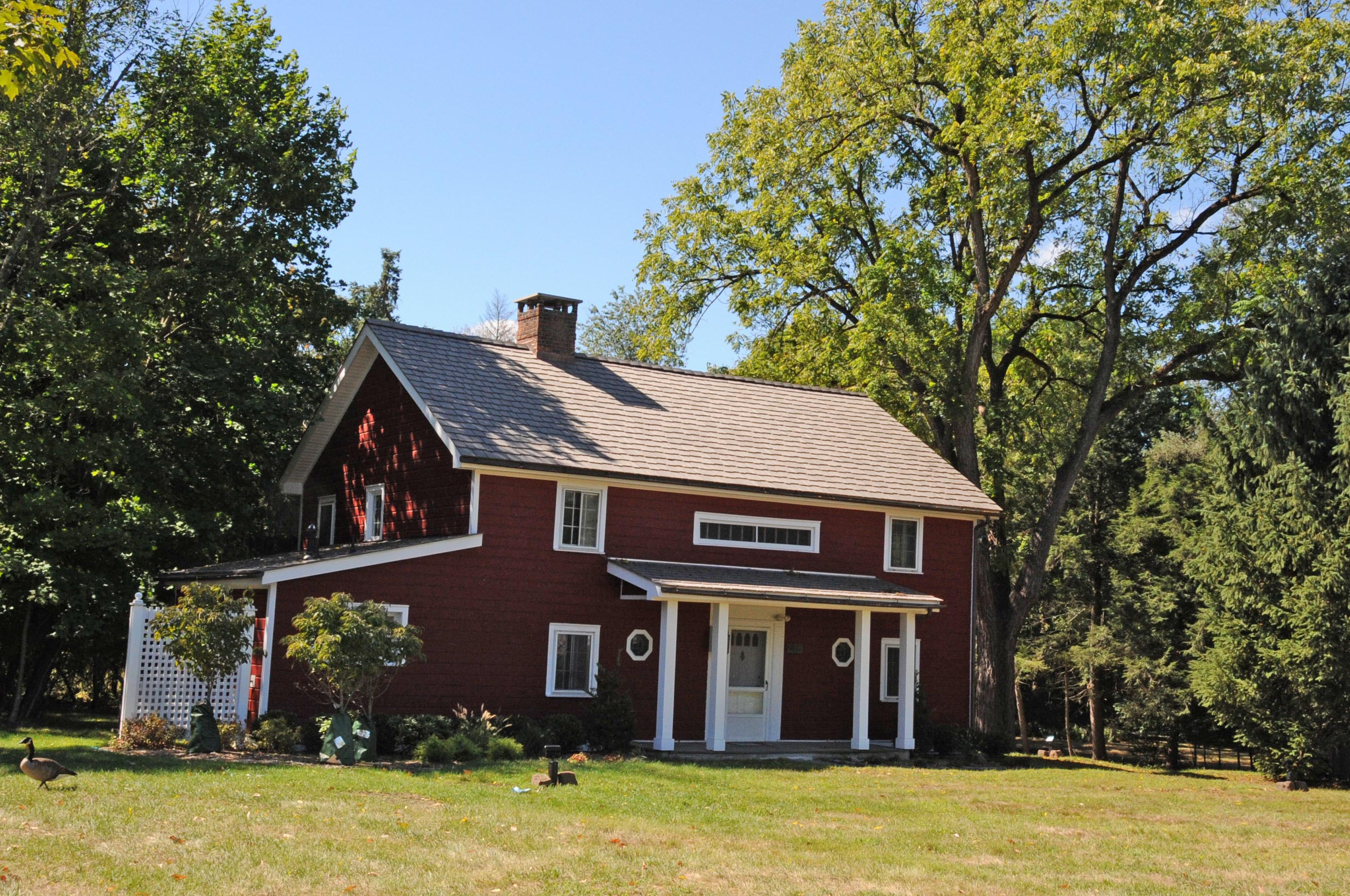
- Garret K. Osborn Barn in 2015

- Location within Bergen County, New Jersey Location within New Jersey Location within the United States
- Location: 88 and 90 East Allendale Road, Saddle River, New Jersey
- Coordinates: 41°1′52″N 74°5′52″W
- Built: c. 1835
- Architect: Harold E. Paddon
- MPS: Saddle River MRA
- NRHP reference No.: 86001607
- NJRHP No.: 687

Significant dates
- Added to NRHP: August 29, 1986
- Designated NJRHP: June 13, 1986

The Garret K. Osborn House and Barn are located at 88 and 90 East Allendale Road in the borough of Saddle River in Bergen County, New Jersey, United States. The house was built around 1835 and was added to the National Register of Historic Places on August 29, 1986, for its significance in architecture. The property was listed as part of the Saddle River Multiple Property Submission (MPS).

== History and description ==
The house was first owned by Garret Hopper Osborn. The barn was built from around 1830 to 1850. From 1931 to 1932, the barn was converted into a restaurant, the "Colonial Door". It was designed by architect Harold E. Paddon and featuring Colonial Revival style. The house was demolished sometime between 2002 and 2012. The barn was converted to a museum by 2015.

== See also ==
- National Register of Historic Places listings in Bergen County, New Jersey
