= Abram Ackerman House =

Historic house in New Jersey, United States

- U.S. National Register of Historic Places
- New Jersey Register of Historic Places
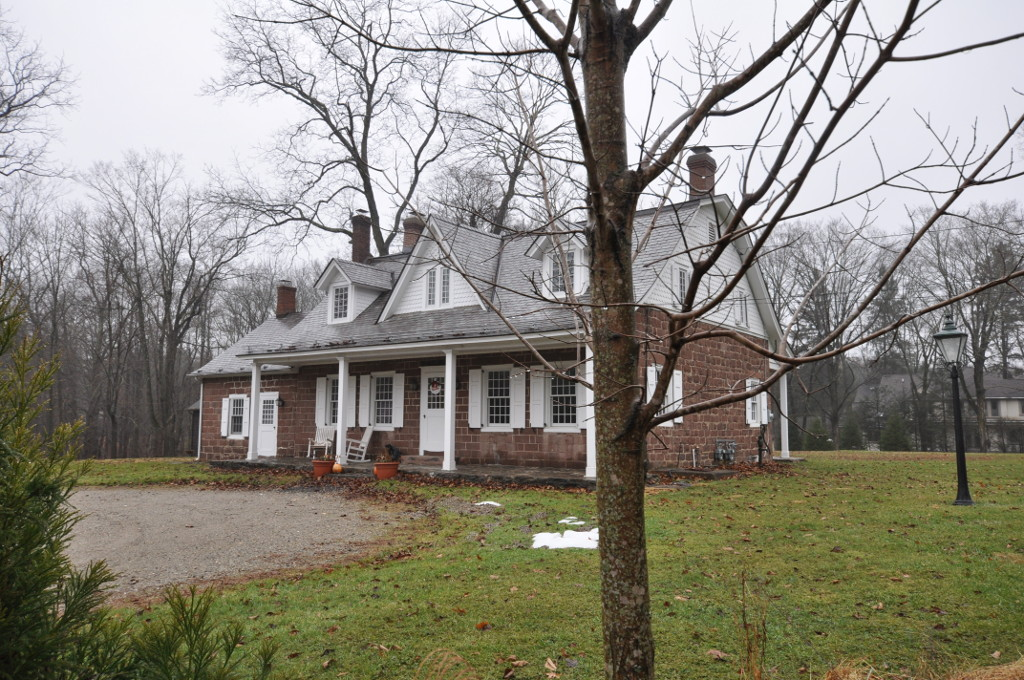
- Abram Ackerman House in 2018

- Location within Bergen County, New Jersey Location within New Jersey Location within the United States
- Location: 199 East Saddle River Road, Saddle River, New Jersey
- Coordinates: 41°2′11″N 74°5′59″W
- Area: 4.2 acres (1.7 ha)
- Built: 1781
- Built by: Abram Ackerman
- MPS: Stone Houses of Bergen County TR; Saddle River MRA
- NRHP reference No.: 83001447
- NJRHP No.: 674

Significant dates
- Added to NRHP: January 10, 1983
- Designated NJRHP: October 3, 1980

The Abram Ackerman House is a historic stone house located at 199 East Saddle River Road in the borough of Saddle River in Bergen County, New Jersey, United States. Built in 1781, it was documented by the Historic American Buildings Survey (HABS) in 1936. The house was added to the National Register of Historic Places on January 10, 1983, for its significance in architecture and exploration/settlement. It was listed as part of the Early Stone Houses of Bergen County Multiple Property Submission (MPS) and the Saddle River MPS.

Town folklore states that General George Washington slept overnight in this house during the American Revolutionary War, however HABS data reports this as unlikely.

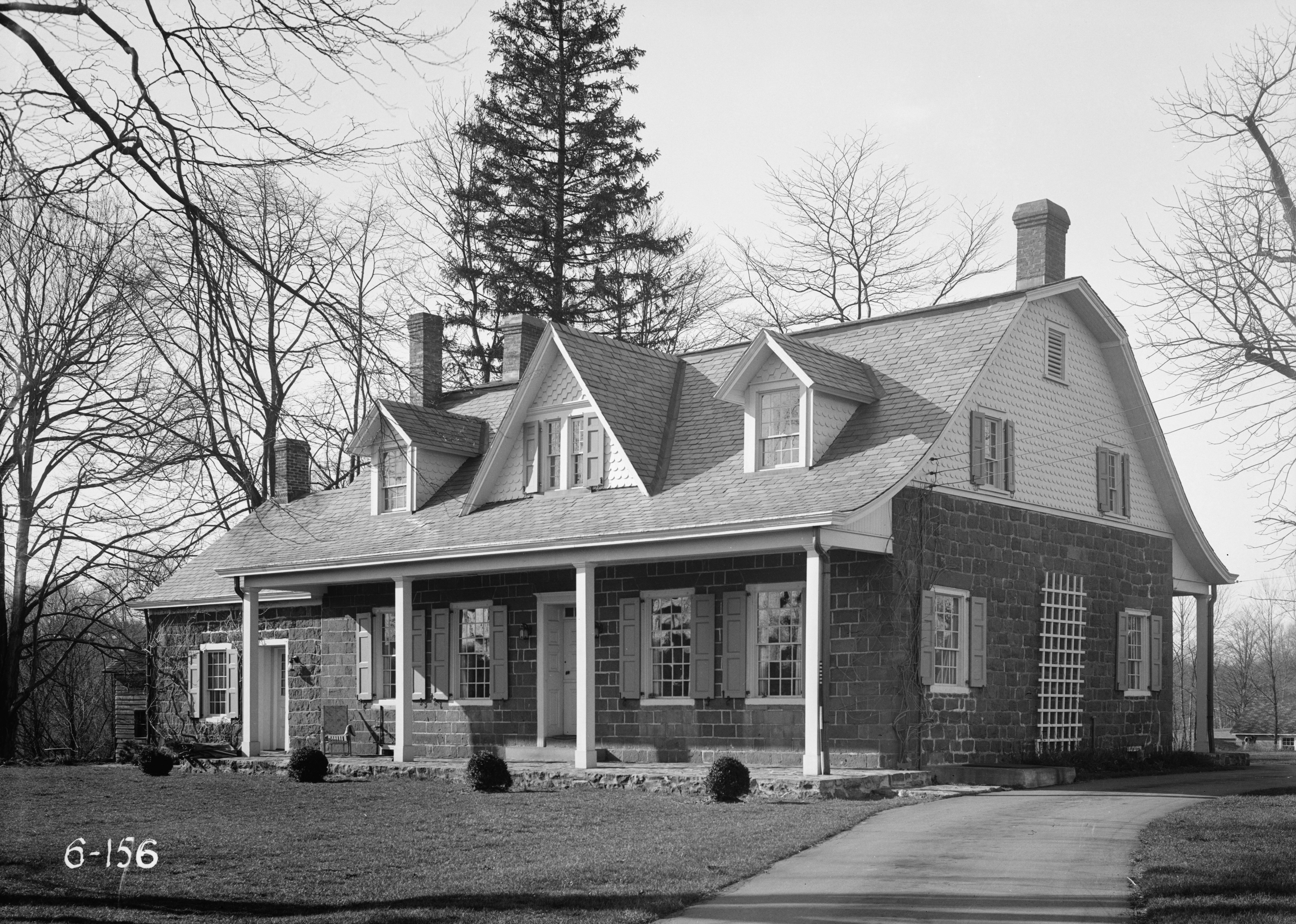
HABS photo from 1936

== See also ==
- National Register of Historic Places listings in Saddle River, New Jersey
- National Register of Historic Places listings in Bergen County, New Jersey
