= Ackerman–Smith House =

Historic house in New Jersey, United States

- U.S. National Register of Historic Places
- New Jersey Register of Historic Places
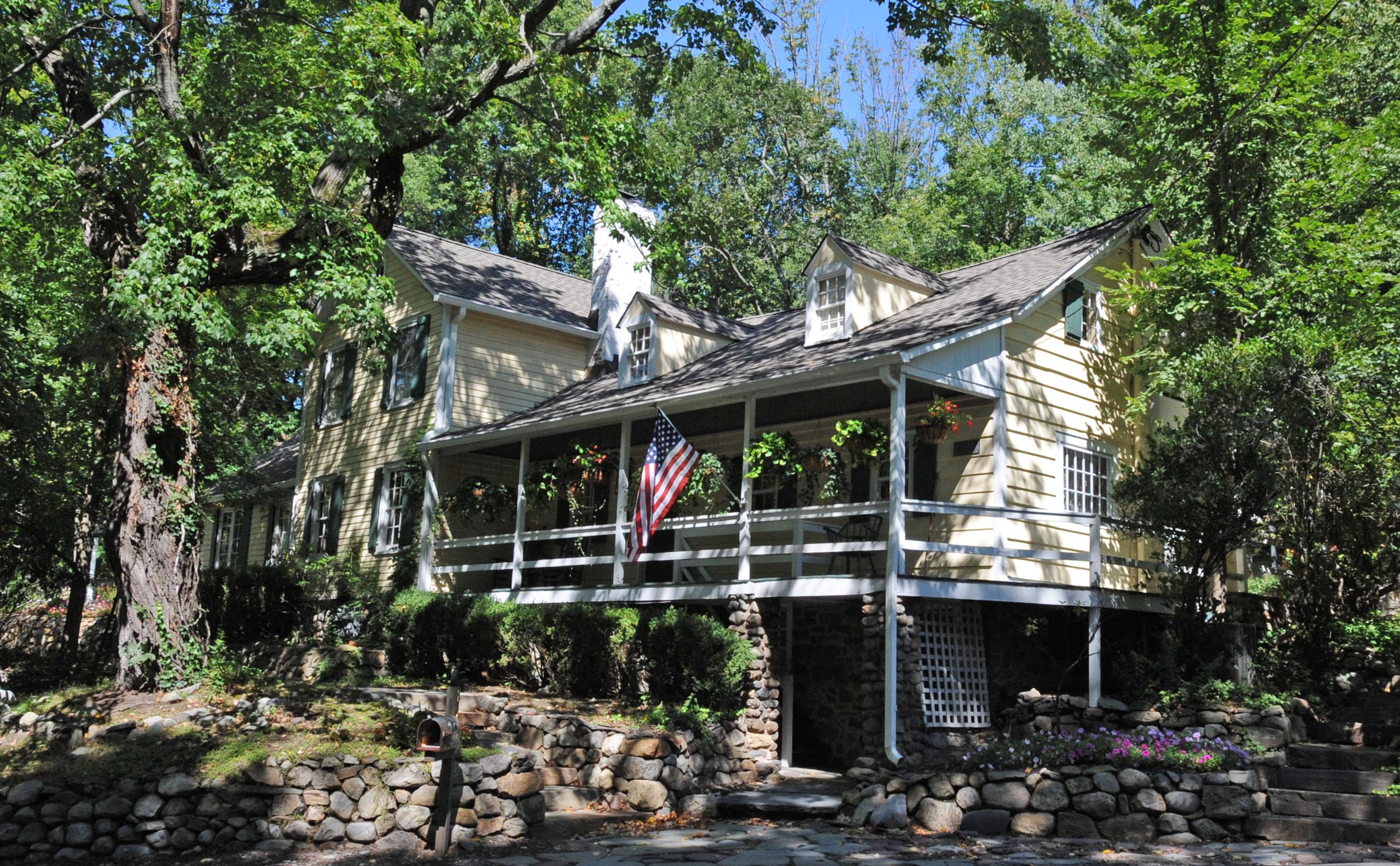

- Location within Bergen County, New Jersey Location within New Jersey Location within the United States
- Location: 171 East Allendale Road, Saddle River, New Jersey
- Coordinates: 41°2′9″N 74°4′58″W
- Area: 1.8 acres (0.73 ha)
- Built: c. 1760
- MPS: Saddle River MRA
- NRHP reference No.: 86001600
- NJRHP No.: 680

Significant dates
- Added to NRHP: August 29, 1986
- Designated NJRHP: June 13, 1986

The Ackerman–Smith House is located at 171 East Allendale Road in the borough of Saddle River in Bergen County, New Jersey, United States. The oldest part of this historic house was built around 1760. It was added to the National Register of Historic Places on August 29, 1986, for its significance in architecture. It was listed as part of the Saddle River Multiple Property Submission (MPS).

From 1881 to 1901, it was the home of Alfred P. Smith, publisher of The Landscape. According to the nomination form, it was one of the earliest newspapers published in the state by an African-American.

== Construction ==
The wood-frame building was originally constructed as a single room around 1760. A later addition doubled its size. The house is now a four-bay unit with a gabled roof. Western wings, porch and dormers were also added.

== See also ==
- National Register of Historic Places listings in Saddle River, New Jersey
- National Register of Historic Places listings in Bergen County, New Jersey
- List of African-American historic places
