= Ackerman–Dater House =

Historic house in New Jersey, United States

- U.S. National Register of Historic Places
- New Jersey Register of Historic Places
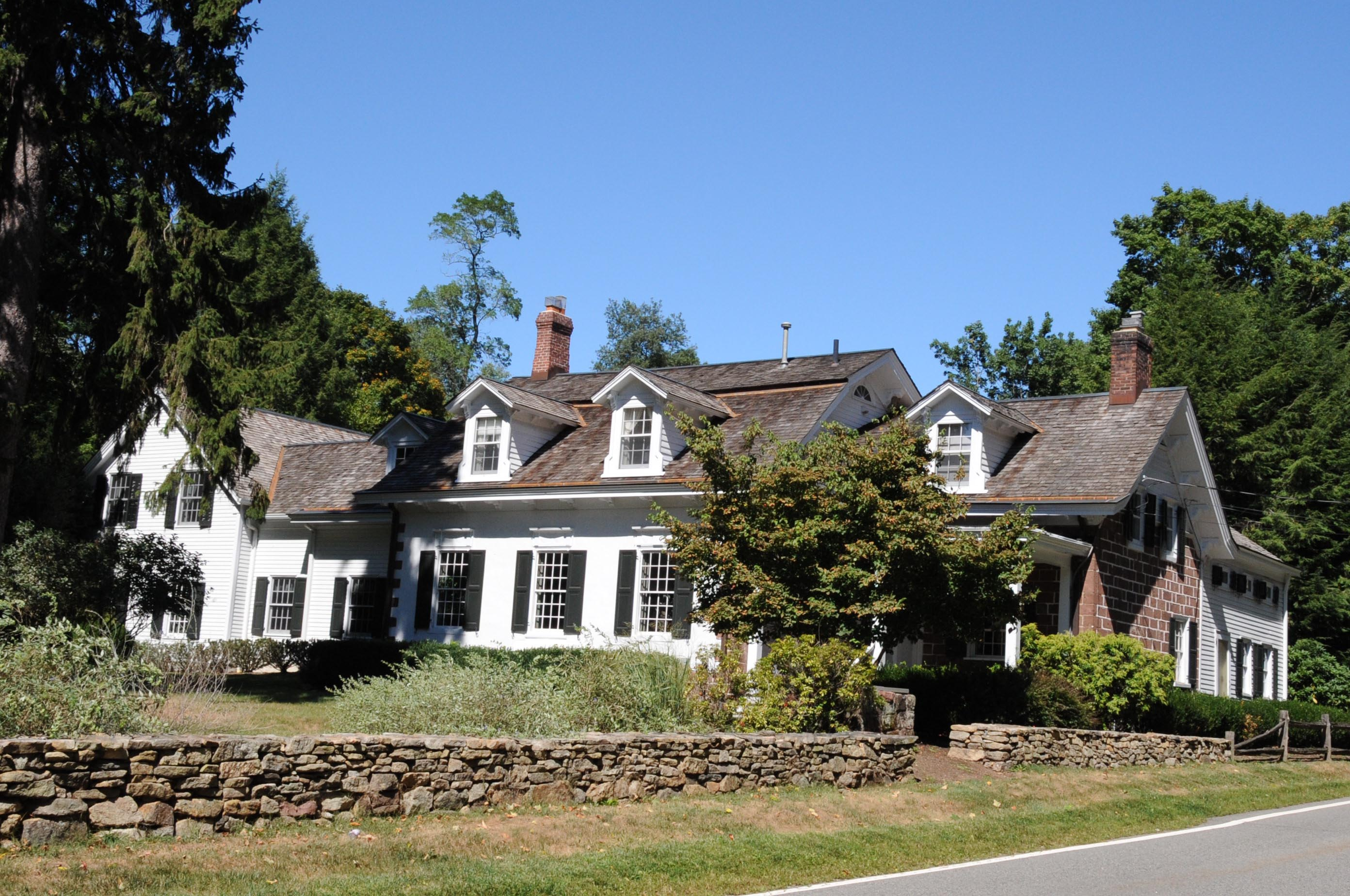

- Location within Bergen County, New Jersey Location within New Jersey Location within the United States
- Location: 109 West Saddle River Road, Saddle River, New Jersey
- Coordinates: 41°1′36″N 74°6′10″W
- Area: 2 acres (0.81 ha)
- Built: 1745
- MPS: Stone Houses of Bergen County TR; Saddle River MRA
- NRHP reference No.: 83001453
- NJRHP No.: 675

Significant dates
- Added to NRHP: January 10, 1983
- Designated NJRHP: October 3, 1980

The Ackerman–Dater House, also known as the Sampmill Farm, is located at 109 West Saddle River Road in the borough of Saddle River in Bergen County, New Jersey, United States. The historic stone house was built in 1745 and was added to the National Register of Historic Places on January 10, 1983, for its significance in architecture. It was listed as part of the Early Stone Houses of Bergen County Multiple Property Submission (MPS) and the Saddle River MPS.

According to the nomination form, Johannes Ackerman bought 245 acres (99 ha) here in 1745. He died in 1760. The main part of the house is dated from 1790 to 1800 based on architectural evidence. Maria Ackerman married Abraham Dater, who is listed as the owner in 1861 and 1876.

== See also ==
- National Register of Historic Places listings in Saddle River, New Jersey
- National Register of Historic Places listings in Bergen County, New Jersey
