= Laurance Thomas Van Buskirk House =

- U.S. National Register of Historic Places
- New Jersey Register of Historic Places
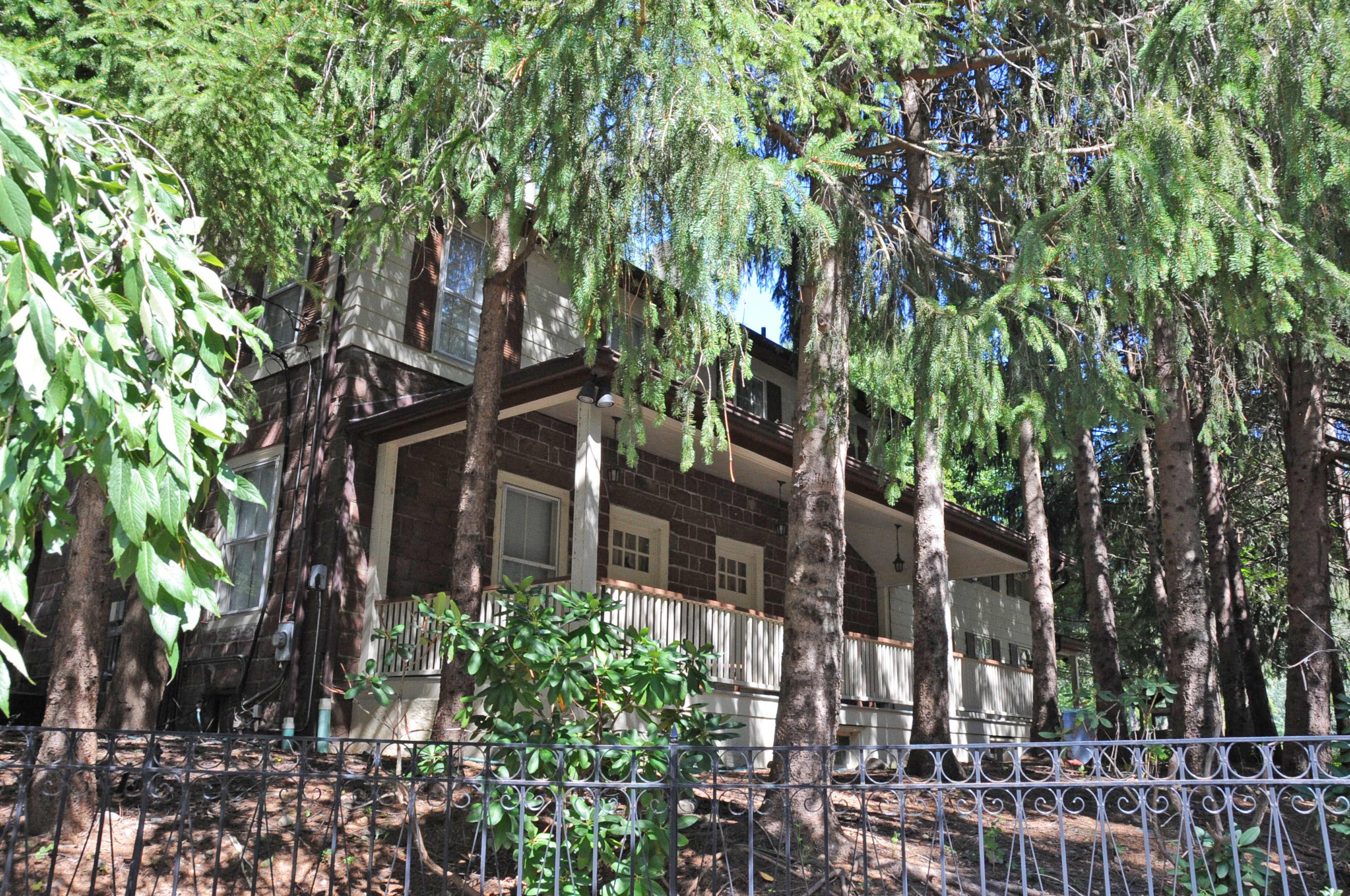

- Location within Bergen County, New Jersey Location within New Jersey Location within the United States
- Location: 116 East Saddle River Road, Saddle River, New Jersey
- Coordinates: 41°00′49″N 74°05′50″W
- Built: c. 1740
- MPS: Stone Houses of Bergen County TR; Saddle River MRA
- NRHP reference No.: 83001560
- NJRHP No.: 692

Significant dates
- Added to NRHP: January 10, 1983
- Designated NJRHP: October 3, 1980

The Laurance Thomas Van Buskirk House is located at 116 East Saddle River Road in the borough of Saddle River in Bergen County, New Jersey, United States. The historic stone house was built around 1740 and was added to the National Register of Historic Places on January 10, 1983, for its significance in architecture and exploration/settlement. It was listed as part of the Early Stone Houses of Bergen County Multiple Property Submission (MPS) and the Saddle River MPS. According to the nomination form, a son of Van Buskirk likely built the house. It is now used as a guest house for a larger mansion built nearby.

== See also ==
- National Register of Historic Places listings in Saddle River, New Jersey
- National Register of Historic Places listings in Bergen County, New Jersey
