= Dr. E. G. Roy House =

Historic house in New Jersey, United States

- U.S. National Register of Historic Places
- New Jersey Register of Historic Places
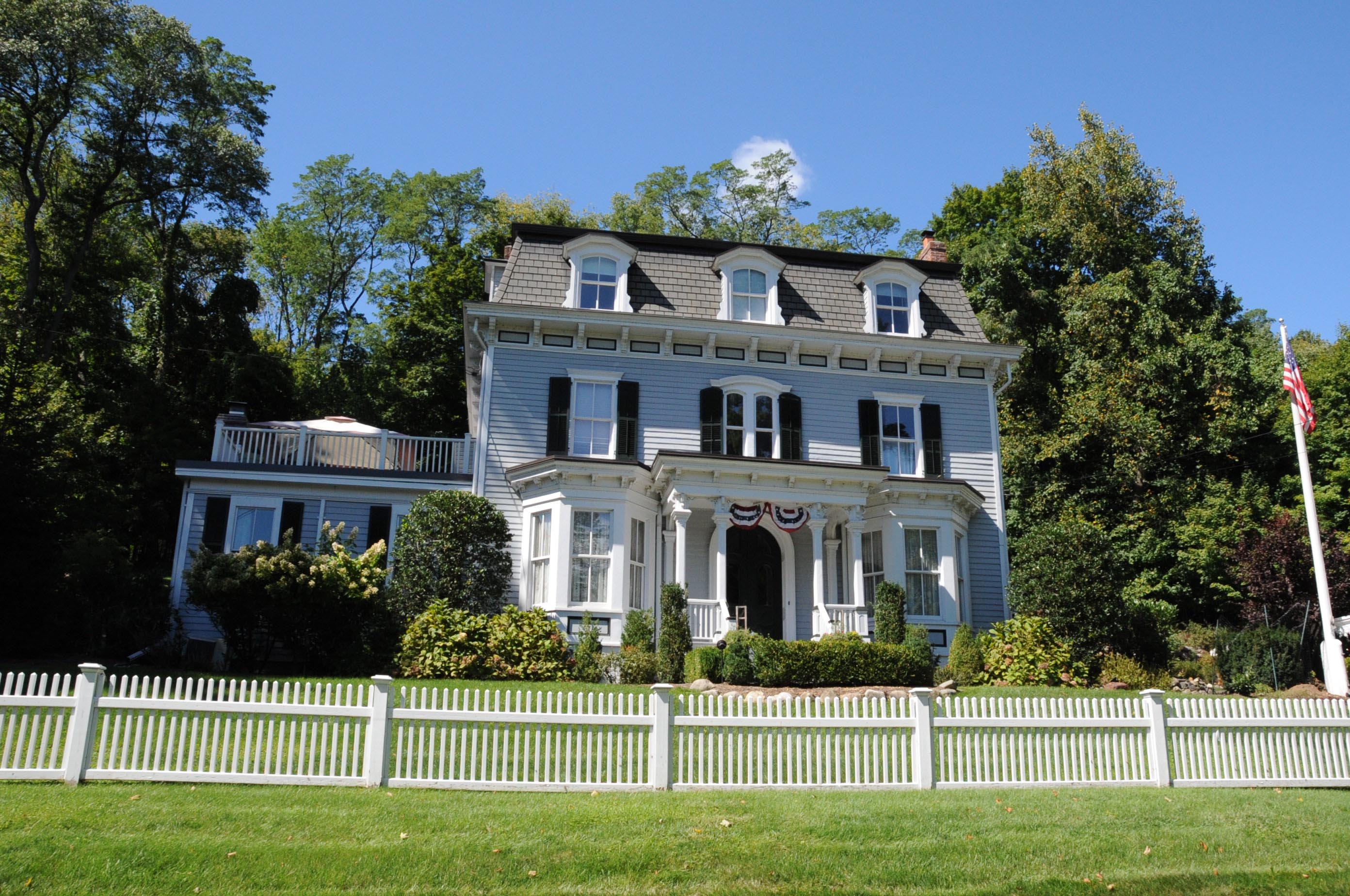

- Location within Bergen County, New Jersey Location within New Jersey Location within the United States
- Location: 229 West Saddle River Road, Saddle River, New Jersey
- Coordinates: 41°2′46″N 74°6′10″W
- Area: 1.6 acres (0.65 ha)
- Built: 1865
- Architectural style: Second Empire
- MPS: Saddle River MRA
- NRHP reference No.: 86001608
- NJRHP No.: 688

Significant dates
- Added to NRHP: August 29, 1986
- Designated NJRHP: June 13, 1986

The Dr. E. G. Roy House is located at 229 West Saddle River Road in the borough of Saddle River in Bergen County, New Jersey, United States. The house was built in 1865 and was added to the National Register of Historic Places on August 29, 1986, for its significance in architecture. It was listed as part of the Saddle River Multiple Property Submission (MPS).

== History and description ==
The two and one-half story house features Second Empire architecture, as seen in its mansard roof. Dr. Roy moved here around 1867 and used the house as his summer home. It remained in the Roy family until 1920.

== See also ==
- National Register of Historic Places listings in Bergen County, New Jersey
