= Ackerman House (Saddle River, New Jersey) =

Historic house in New Jersey, United States

- U.S. National Register of Historic Places
- New Jersey Register of Historic Places
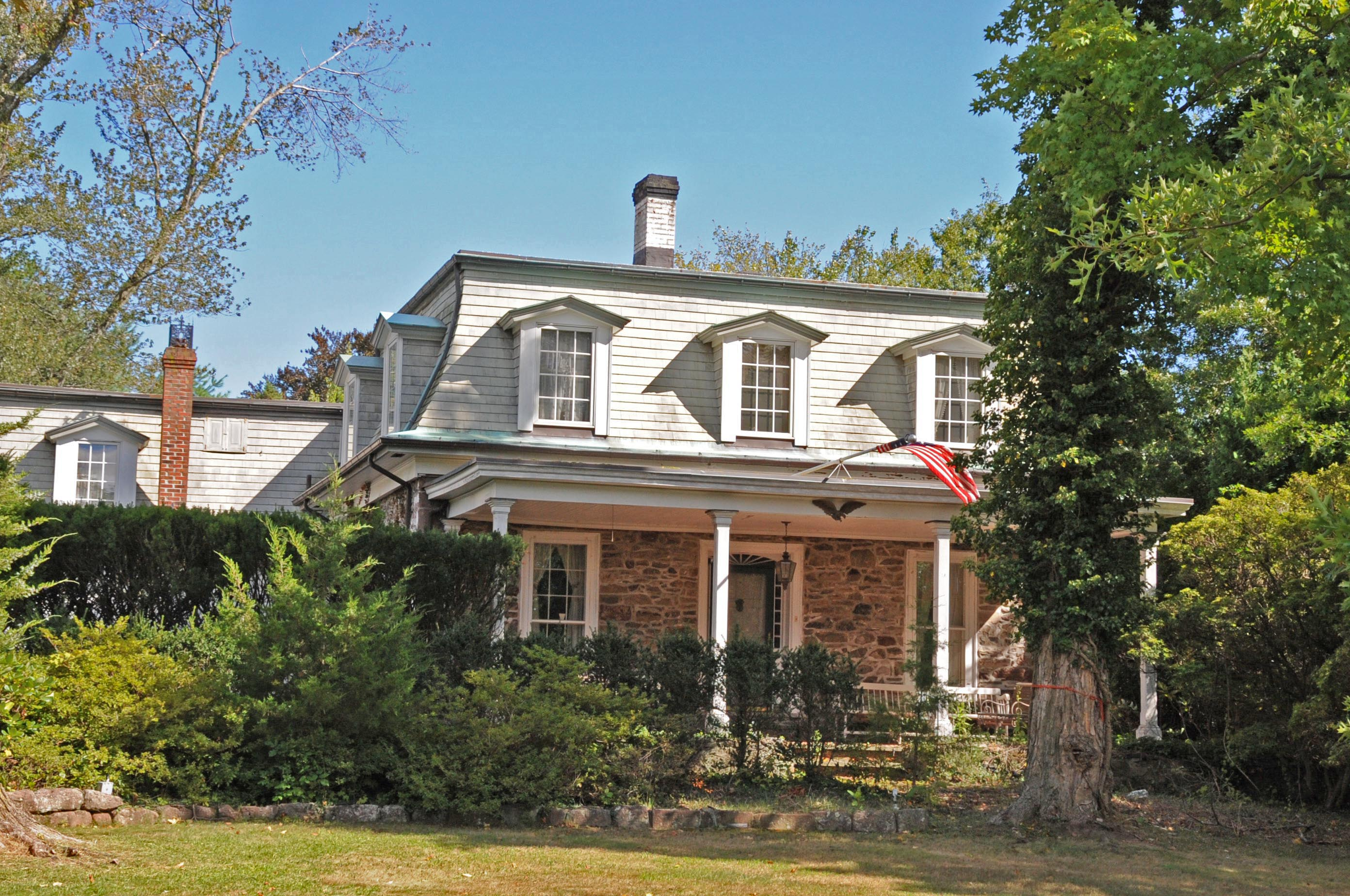

- Location within Bergen County, New Jersey Location within New Jersey Location within the United States
- Location: 136 Chestnut Ridge Road, Saddle River, New Jersey
- Coordinates: 41°1′42″N 74°5′7″W
- Area: 1.4 acres (0.57 ha)
- Built: c. 1802
- Built by: Ackerman
- MPS: Stone Houses of Bergen County TR; Saddle River MRA
- NRHP reference No.: 83001449
- NJRHP No.: 673

Significant dates
- Added to NRHP: January 10, 1983
- Designated NJRHP: October 3, 1980

The Ackerman House is a historic stone house located at 136 Chestnut Ridge Road in the borough of Saddle River in Bergen County, New Jersey, United States. The house was built in 1811 and was added to the National Register of Historic Places on January 10, 1983, for its significance in architecture. It was listed as part of the Early Stone Houses of Bergen County Multiple Property Submission (MPS) and the Saddle River MPS.

In 1797, Catherine Ackerman purchased 77 acres (31 hectares) of land to build a house for her son Abraham P. Ackerman. The one-and-a-half-story house was completed by 1802. A kitchen wing was added later. Their son, William Ackerman, lived here in 1861 and added the frame wing behind the kitchen. His son, Abraham W. Ackerman, built the mansard roof around 1875–1876.

== See also ==
- National Register of Historic Places listings in Saddle River, New Jersey
- National Register of Historic Places listings in Bergen County, New Jersey
