= Alonzo Foringer House and Studio =

Historic house in New Jersey, United States

- U.S. National Register of Historic Places
- New Jersey Register of Historic Places
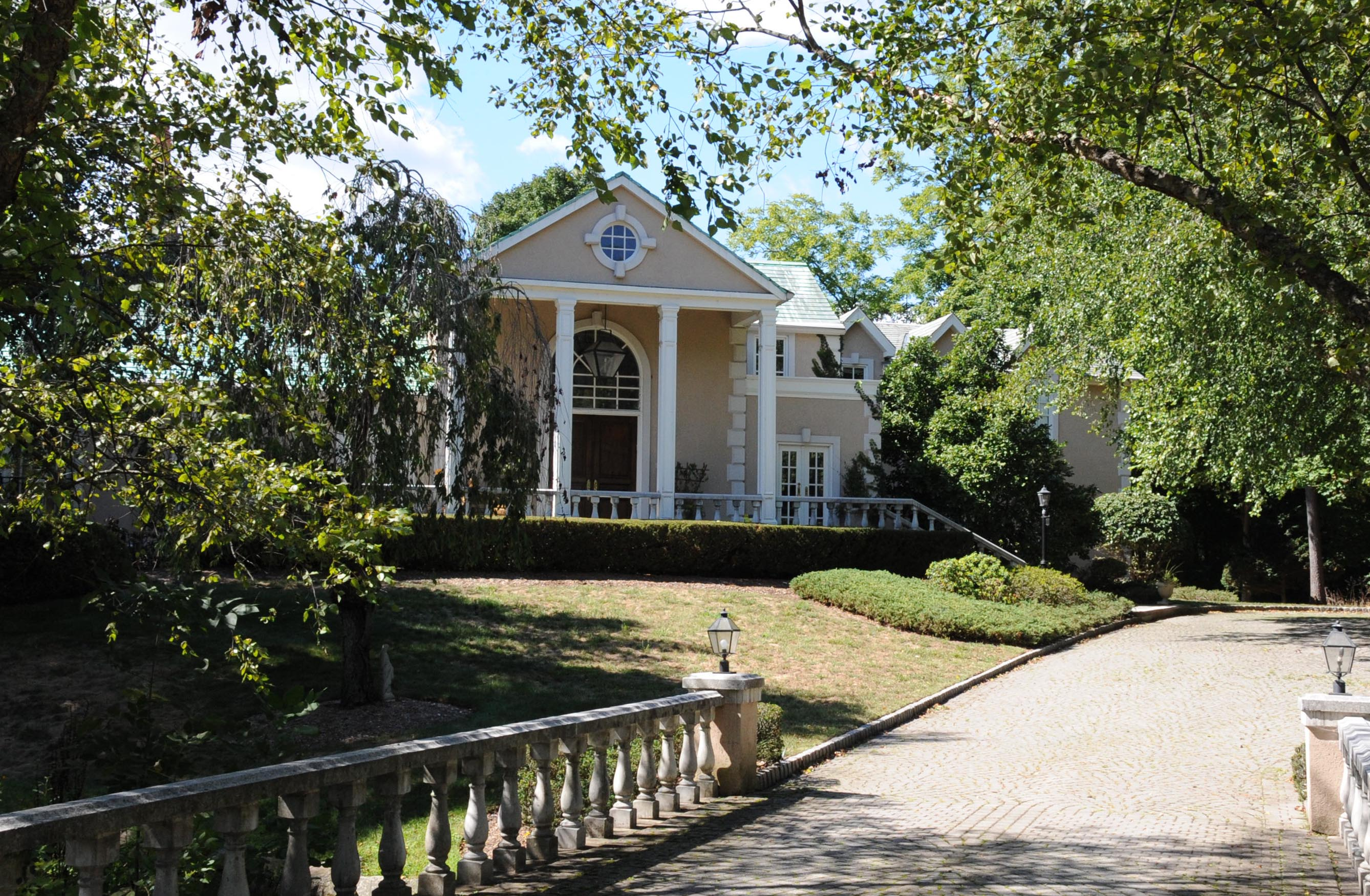

- Location within Bergen County, New Jersey Location within New Jersey Location within the United States
- Location: 107 and 107B East Saddle River Road, Saddle River, New Jersey
- Coordinates: 41°1′19″N 74°5′48″W
- Area: 4.9 acres (2.0 ha)
- Built: 1897
- Built by: E. Hughes
- Architectural style: Colonial Revival, Modern Movement, French Country house
- MPS: Saddle River MRA
- NRHP reference No.: 86001604
- NJRHP No.: 683

Significant dates
- Added to NRHP: August 29, 1986
- Designated NJRHP: June 13, 1986

The Alonzo Foringer House and Studio are located at 107 and 107B East Saddle River Road in the borough of Saddle River in Bergen County, New Jersey, United States. The house, once owned by painter Alonzo Foringer, was built in 1897. The property was added to the National Register of Historic Places on August 29, 1986, for its significance in architecture and art. It was listed as part of the Saddle River Multiple Property Submission (MPS).

== History and description ==
According to the nomination form, the house was probably built in 1897 by Rev. E. Hughes. The studio was built over a stream in 1922. The house and studio were used by Foringer from 1922 until his death in 1948.

== See also ==
- National Register of Historic Places listings in Bergen County, New Jersey
