= Garret and Maria Ackerman House =

- U.S. National Register of Historic Places
- New Jersey Register of Historic Places
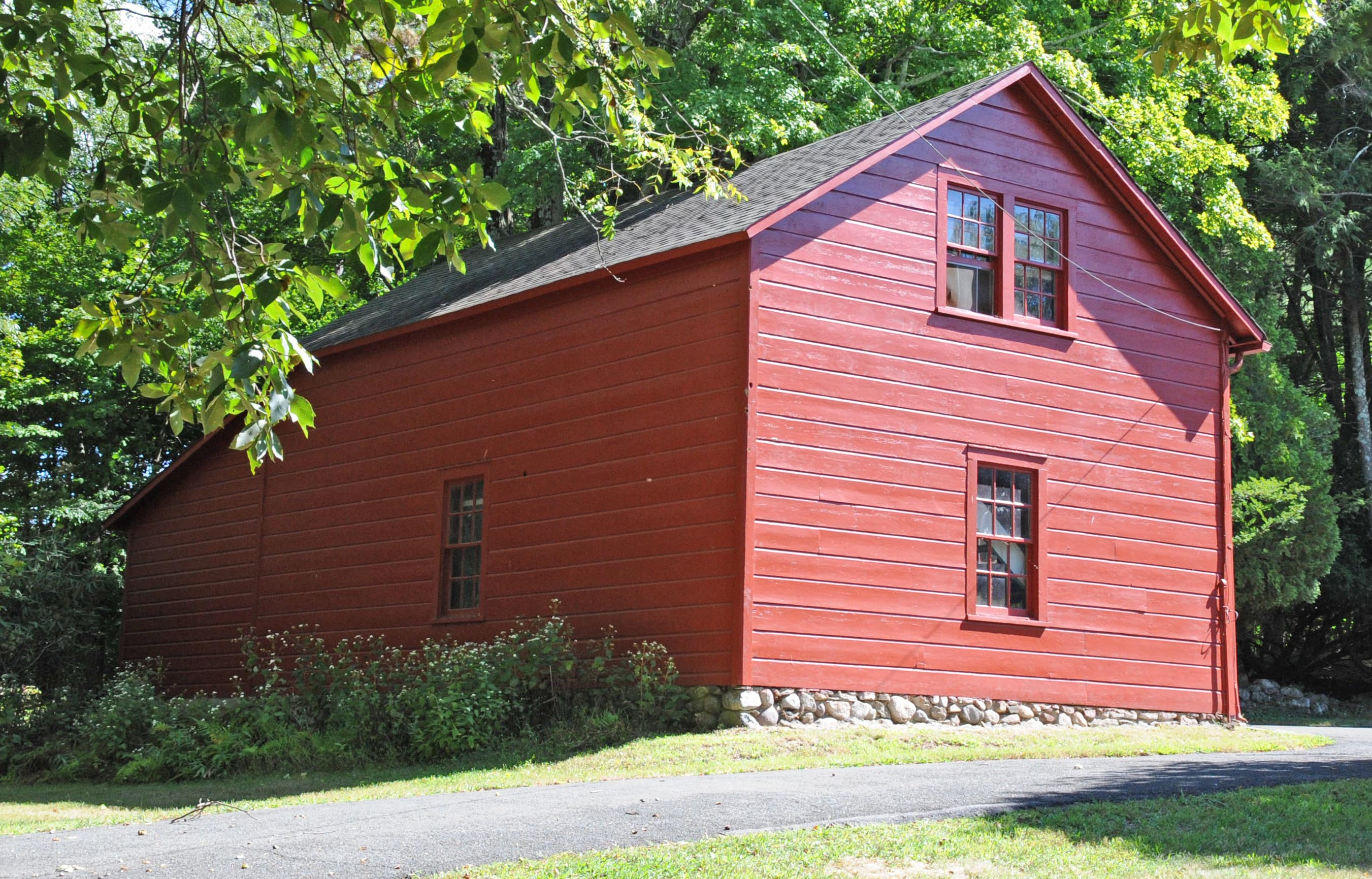
- Barn

- Location within Bergen County, New Jersey Location within New Jersey Location within the United States
- Location: 150 East Saddle River Road, Saddle River, New Jersey
- Coordinates: 41°01′41″N 74°05′43″W
- Area: 2.9 acres (1.2 ha)
- Built: 1824
- Architectural style: Vernacular Greek Revival
- MPS: Saddle River MRA
- NRHP reference No.: 86001598
- NJRHP No.: 678

Significant dates
- Added to NRHP: August 29, 1986
- Designated NJRHP: June 13, 1986

The Garret and Maria Ackerman House is located at 150 East Saddle River Road in the borough of Saddle River in Bergen County, New Jersey, United States. The historic frame house was built in 1824 and was documented as the Van Buskirk-Arkerman House by the Historic American Buildings Survey (HABS) in 1937. It was added to the National Register of Historic Places on August 29, 1986, for its significance in architecture. It was listed as part of the Saddle River Multiple Property Submission (MPS). Thomas Van Buskirk gave the house to his daughter Maria when she married Garret A. Ackerman in 1824.

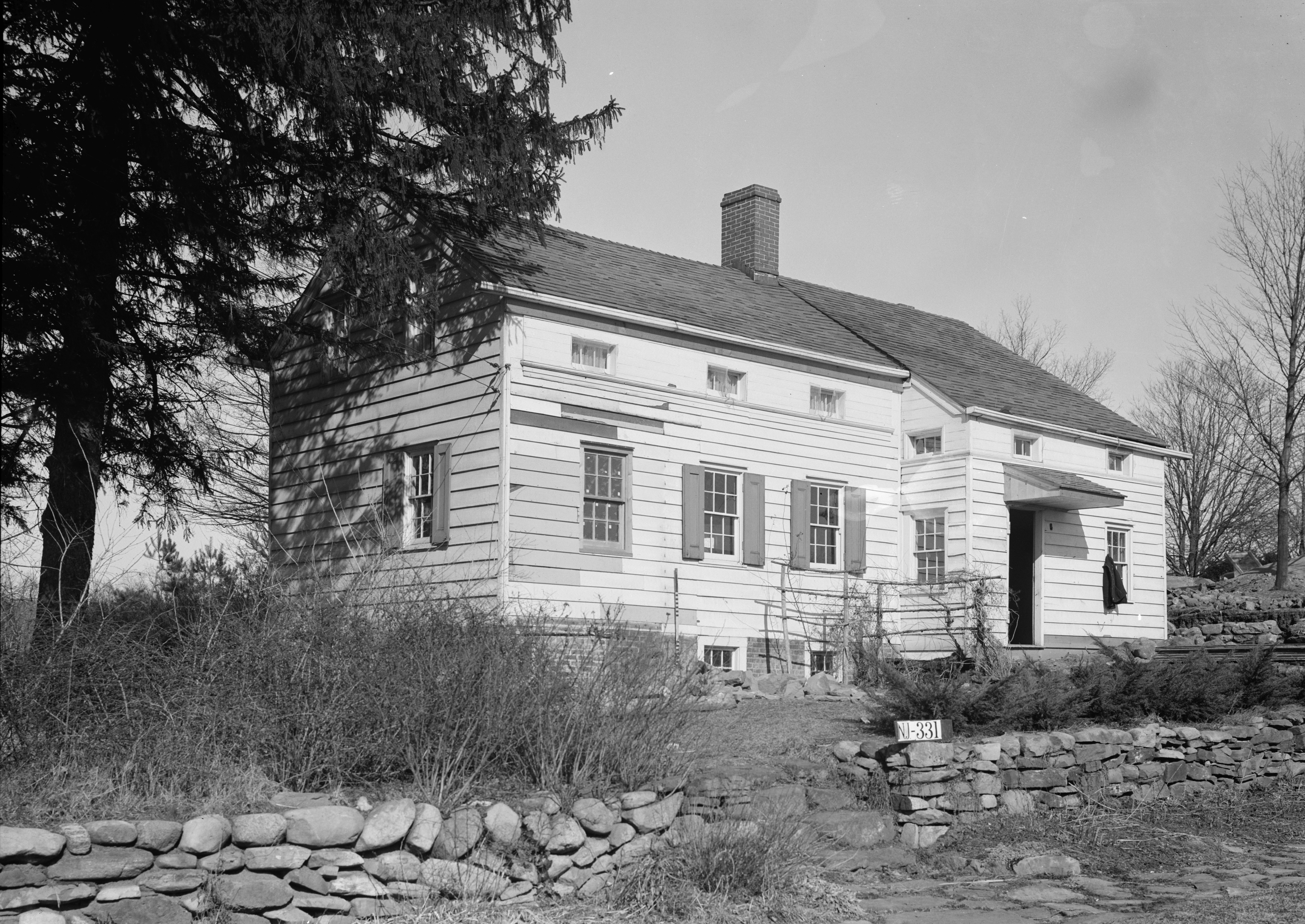
HABS photo from 1937

== See also ==
- National Register of Historic Places listings in Saddle River, New Jersey
- National Register of Historic Places listings in Bergen County, New Jersey
