= National Register of Historic Places listings in Ridgewood, New Jersey =

Map of Bergen County, New Jersey, highlighting Ridgewood

List of the National Register of Historic Places listings in the village of Ridgewood in Bergen County, New Jersey, United States.

Contents: Counties and communities in New Jersey
Atlantic – Bergen (Closter, Franklin Lakes, Ridgewood, Saddle River, Wyckoff) – Burlington – Camden – Cape May – Cumberland – Essex – Gloucester – Hudson – Hunterdon – Mercer – Middlesex – Monmouth – Morris – Ocean – Passaic – Salem – Somerset – Sussex – Union – Warren

The table below includes 14 sites listed on the National Register of Historic Places in the village of Ridgewood in Bergen County, New Jersey. Latitude and longitude coordinates of the sites listed on this page may be displayed in an online map.

This National Park Service list is complete through NPS recent listings posted November 6, 2026.

== Current listings ==
	Name on the Register	Image	Date listed	Location	Description
1	Ackerman House	Ackerman House	January 10, 1983 (#83001450)	222 Doremus Avenue; 40°58′23″N 74°07′37″W	Part of the Early Stone Houses of Bergen County Multiple Property Submission (MPS)
2	Ackerman House	Ackerman House	January 10, 1983 (#83001451)	252 Lincoln Avenue; 40°58′29″N 74°08′05″W	Part of the Early Stone Houses of Bergen County MPS
3	David Ackerman House	David Ackerman House	January 10, 1983 (#83001448)	415 E. Saddle River Road; 40°59′06″N 74°05′20″W	Part of the Early Stone Houses of Bergen County MPS
4	Ackerman–Van Emburgh House	Ackerman–Van Emburgh House	January 10, 1983 (#83001456)	789 East Glen Avenue; 40°59′03″N 74°05′19″W	Part of the Early Stone Houses of Bergen County MPS
5	Archibald–Vroom House	Archibald–Vroom House	July 24, 1984 (#84002596)	160 E. Ridgewood Avenue; 40°58′43″N 74°06′58″W	Part of the Early Stone Houses of Bergen County MPS
6	Beech Street School	Beech Street School	March 12, 1998 (#98000233)	49 Cottage Place; 40°58′47″N 74°06′53″W	Ridgewood Education Center, Ridgewood Public Schools
7	Paramus Reformed Church Historic District	Paramus Reformed Church Historic District	February 25, 1975 (#75001121)	660 East Glen Avenue; 40°59′09″N 74°05′39″W	Includes the Old Paramus Reformed Church founded in 1725
8	Rathbone–Zabriskie House	Rathbone–Zabriskie House	January 10, 1983 (#83001545)	570 N. Maple Avenue; 40°59′43″N 74°06′41″W	Part of the Early Stone Houses of Bergen County MPS
9	Ridgewood Station	Ridgewood Station	June 22, 1984 (#84002582)	Garber Square; 40°58′51″N 74°07′16″W	Part of the Operating Passenger Railroad Stations TR
10	James C. Rose Residence	James C. Rose Residence	July 11, 2019 (#97000936)	506 E. Ridgewood Avenue; 40°58′38″N 74°06′31″W	Part of the James Rose Center
11	Van Dien House	Van Dien House	January 10, 1983 (#83001567)	627 Grove Street; 40°57′59″N 74°06′03″W	Part of the Early Stone Houses of Bergen County MPS
12	Vanderbeck House	Vanderbeck House	January 10, 1983 (#83001564)	249 Prospect Street; 40°58′25″N 74°07′01″W	Part of the Early Stone Houses of Bergen County MPS
13	Westervelt–Cameron House	Westervelt–Cameron House	January 10, 1983 (#83001581)	26 E. Glen Avenue; 40°59′21″N 74°06′54″W	Part of the Early Stone Houses of Bergen County MPS
14	John A. L. Zabriskie House	John A. L. Zabriskie House	November 22, 2019 (#100004648)	460 W. Saddle River Road; 40°59′19″N 74°05′34″W	Also known as the Zabriskie–Schedler House
