= Van Dien =

Van Dien is a surname of Dutch origin. Notable people with the surname include:

- Casper Van Dien (born 1968), American actor
- Elsa van Dien (1914–2007), American astronomer
- Grace Van Dien (born 1996), American actress

== See also ==
- Văn Điển Railway Station, railway station in Vietnam
- Van Dien House, historic house in Ridgewood, New Jersey
- Harmon Van Dien House, historic house in Paramus, New Jersey
