= James Rose Center =

- James C. Rose Residence
- U.S. National Register of Historic Places
- New Jersey Register of Historic Places
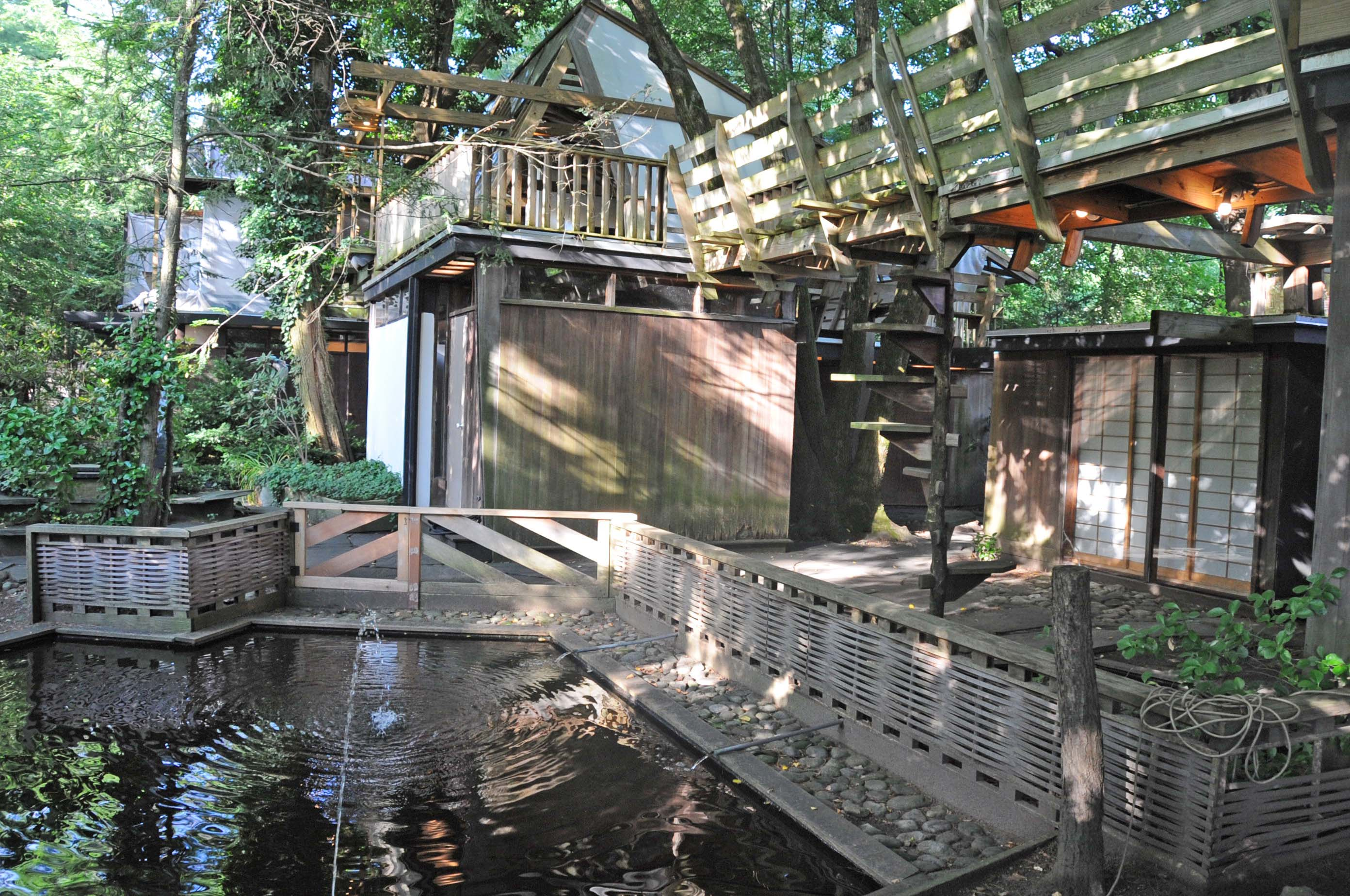
- Headquarters of the James Rose Center

- Location within Bergen County, New Jersey Location within New Jersey Location within the United States
- Location: 506 East Ridgewood Avenue, Ridgewood, New Jersey
- Coordinates: 40°58′37.0″N 74°6′30.5″W
- Built: 1953
- NRHP reference No.: 97000936
- NJRHP No.: 1934

Significant dates
- Added to NRHP: July 11, 2019
- Designated NJRHP: July 7, 1997

The James Rose Center is a non-profit landscape research and study foundation located at 506 East Ridgewood Avenue in the village of Ridgewood in Bergen County, New Jersey, United States. Its headquarters, the James C. Rose Residence, was designed by modern landscape architect James C. Rose. The historic house was built in 1953 and was added to the National Register of Historic Places on July 11, 2019, for its significance in architecture and landscape architecture. It is also a member of the Iconic Houses Network.

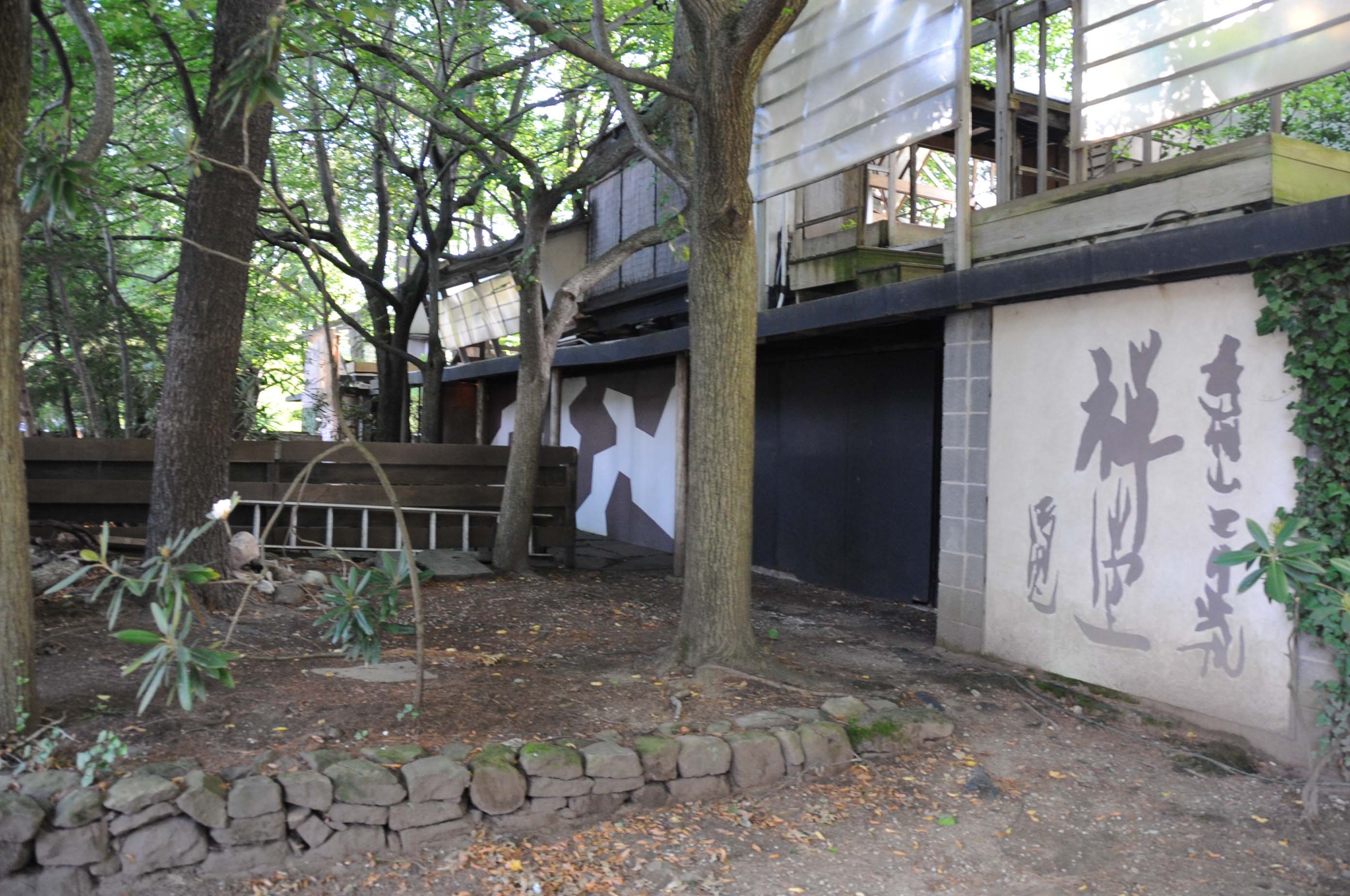
House and gardens

== See also ==
- National Register of Historic Places listings in Ridgewood, New Jersey
- National Register of Historic Places listings in Bergen County, New Jersey
