= John A. L. Zabriskie House =

- U.S. National Register of Historic Places
- New Jersey Register of Historic Places
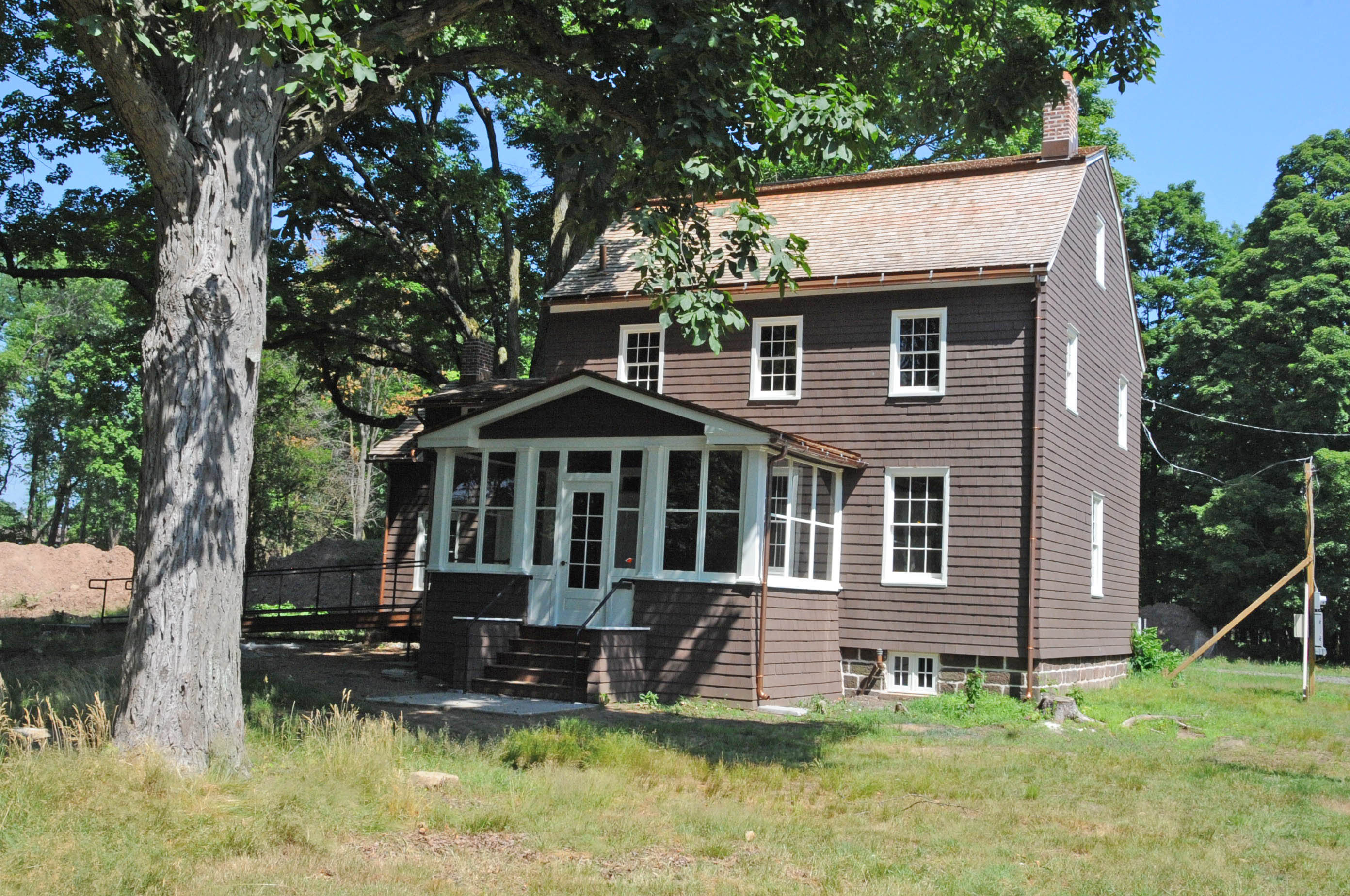

- Location within Bergen County, New Jersey Location within New Jersey Location within the United States
- Location: 460 West Saddle River Road, Ridgewood, New Jersey
- Coordinates: 40°59′18.6″N 74°5′34.15″W
- Built: c. 1825
- NRHP reference No.: 100004648
- NJRHP No.: 5339

Significant dates
- Added to NRHP: November 22, 2019
- Designated NJRHP: August 14, 2019

The John A. L. Zabriskie House, also known as the Zabriskie–Schedler House, is located at 460 West Saddle River Road in the village of Ridgewood in Bergen County, New Jersey, United States. The historic frame house was built around 1825 and was added to the National Register of Historic Places on November 22, 2019, for its significance in architecture.

John A. L. Zabriskie was a farmer. After his death in 1864, his son, James Zabriskie, inherited the property. It was later purchased by the Smith family in 1908. Florence Schedler, daughter of Carman Smith, lived here until her death in 2007. The village purchased the property in 2009, with plans to use it as a public park.

== See also ==
- National Register of Historic Places listings in Ridgewood, New Jersey
- National Register of Historic Places listings in Bergen County, New Jersey
