= Beech Street School =

- U.S. National Register of Historic Places
- New Jersey Register of Historic Places
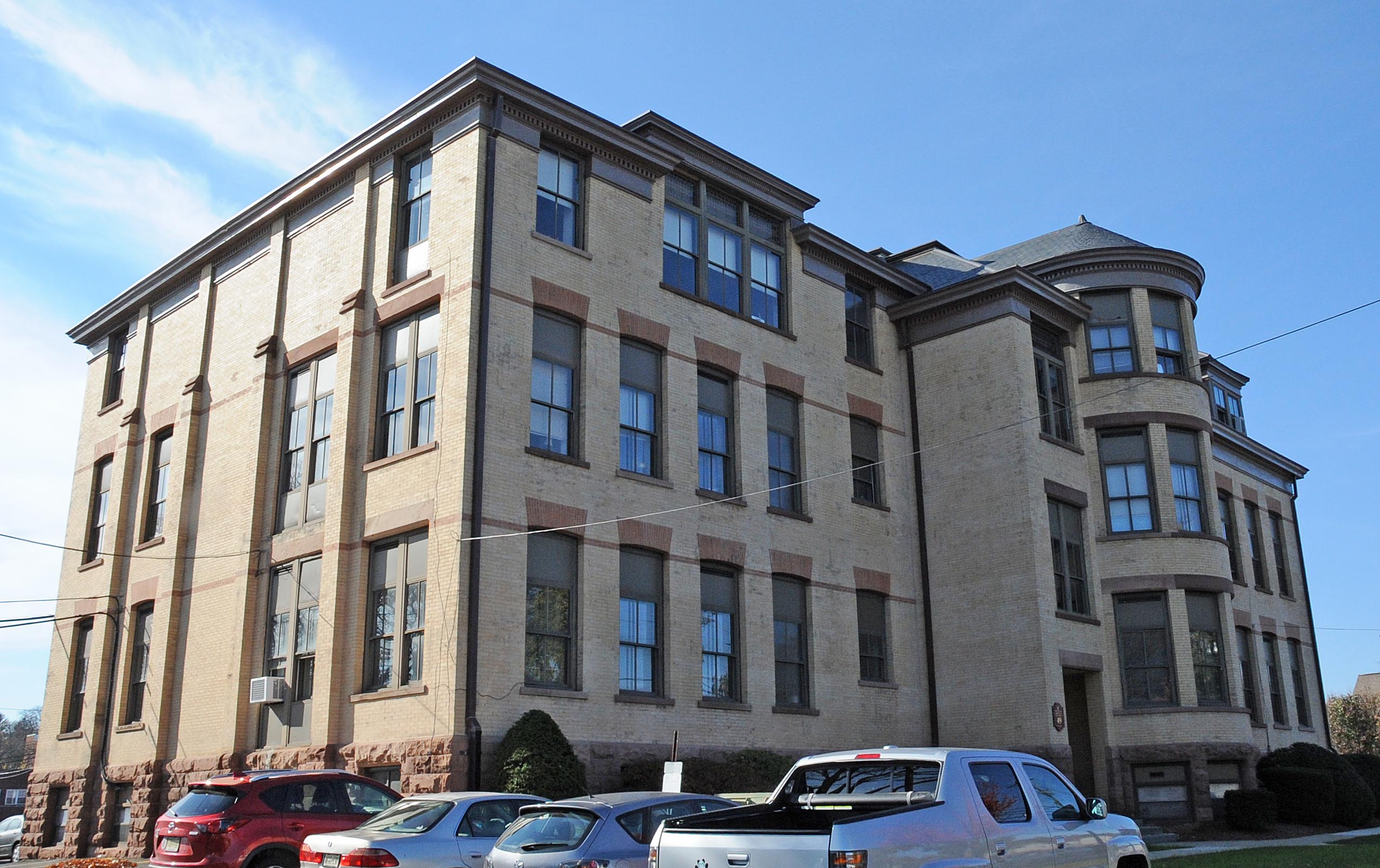

- Location within Bergen County, New Jersey Location within New Jersey Location within the United States
- Location: 49 Cottage Place, Ridgewood, New Jersey
- Coordinates: 40°58′46.73″N 74°6′53.37″W
- Built: 1895
- Built by: Joseph H. Christopher
- Architect: J. Warner Allen
- Architectural style: Romanesque Revival
- NRHP reference No.: 98000233
- NJRHP No.: 82

Significant dates
- Added to NRHP: March 12, 1998
- Designated NJRHP: February 2, 1998

The Beech Street School, also known as the Ridgewood Education Center, is located at 49 Cottage Place in the village of Ridgewood in Bergen County, New Jersey, United States. The historic schoolhouse was built in 1895 and added to the National Register of Historic Places on March 12, 1998, for its significance in architecture, education, and community development. It was designed by architect J. Warner Allen and constructed by Joseph H. Christopher. The building is an example of the Romanesque Revival style of architecture. It is currently used as office space for the administration of the Ridgewood Public Schools.

== See also ==
- National Register of Historic Places listings in Ridgewood, New Jersey
- National Register of Historic Places listings in Bergen County, New Jersey
