= Rathbone–Zabriskie House =

Historic house in New Jersey, United States

- U.S. National Register of Historic Places
- New Jersey Register of Historic Places
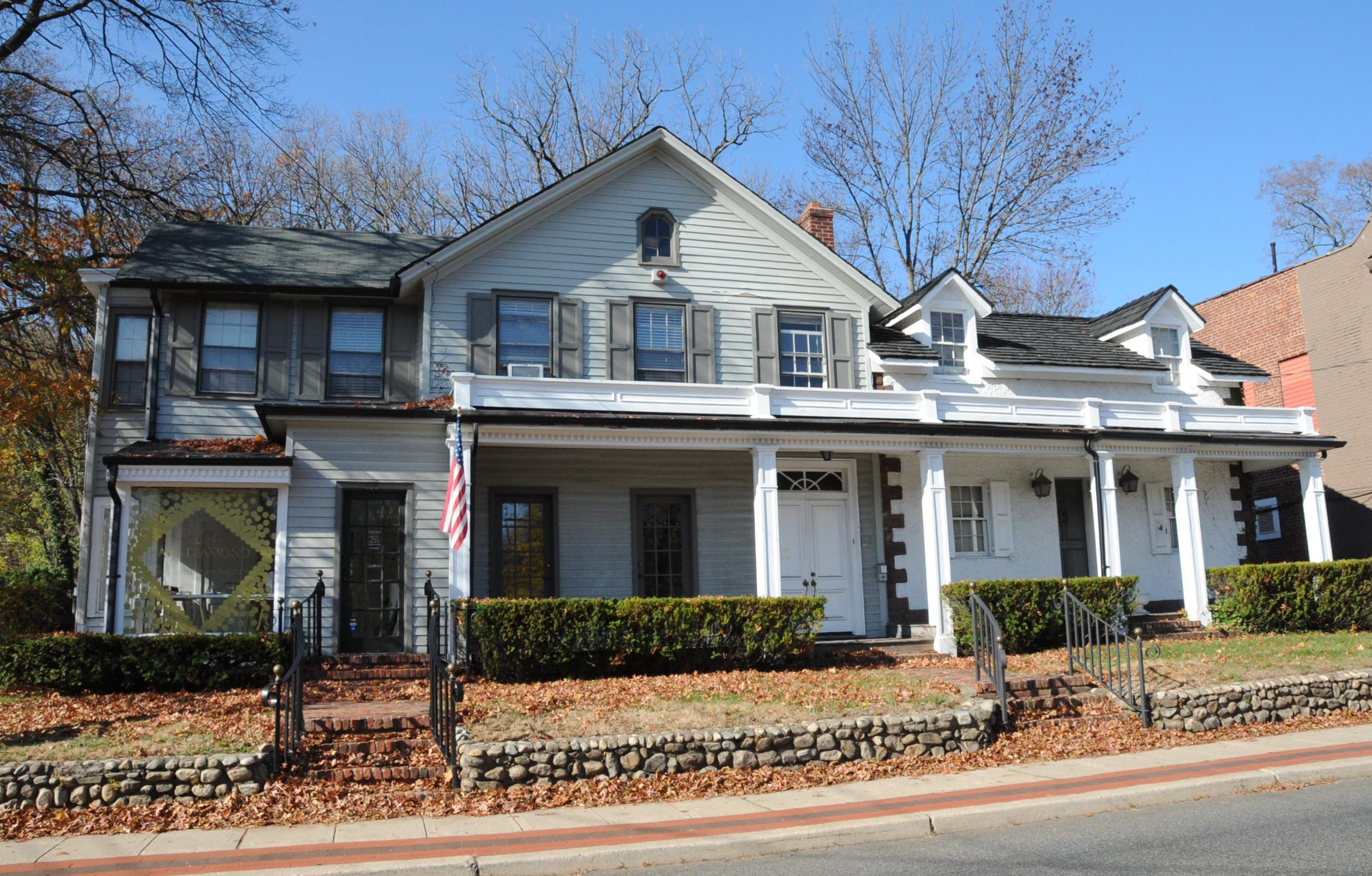

- Location within Bergen County, New Jersey Location within New Jersey Location within the United States
- Location: 570 North Maple Avenue, Ridgewood, New Jersey
- Coordinates: 40°59′43″N 74°6′41″W
- Built: c. 1790
- MPS: Stone Houses of Bergen County TR
- NRHP reference No.: 83001545
- NJRHP No.: 645

Significant dates
- Added to NRHP: January 10, 1983
- Designated NJRHP: October 3, 1980

The Rathbone–Zabriskie House is located at 570 North Maple Avenue in the village of Ridgewood in Bergen County, New Jersey, United States. The historic stone house was built around 1790 based on architectural evidence. It was added to the National Register of Historic Places on January 10, 1983, for its significance in architecture. It was listed as part of the Early Stone Houses of Bergen County Multiple Property Submission (MPS).

According to the nomination form, the one and one-half story house was owned by W. E. Rathbone in 1861 and by Henry Zabriskie in 1876.

== See also ==
- National Register of Historic Places listings in Ridgewood, New Jersey
- National Register of Historic Places listings in Bergen County, New Jersey
