= Ackerman–Van Emburgh House =

Historic house in New Jersey, United States

- U.S. National Register of Historic Places
- New Jersey Register of Historic Places
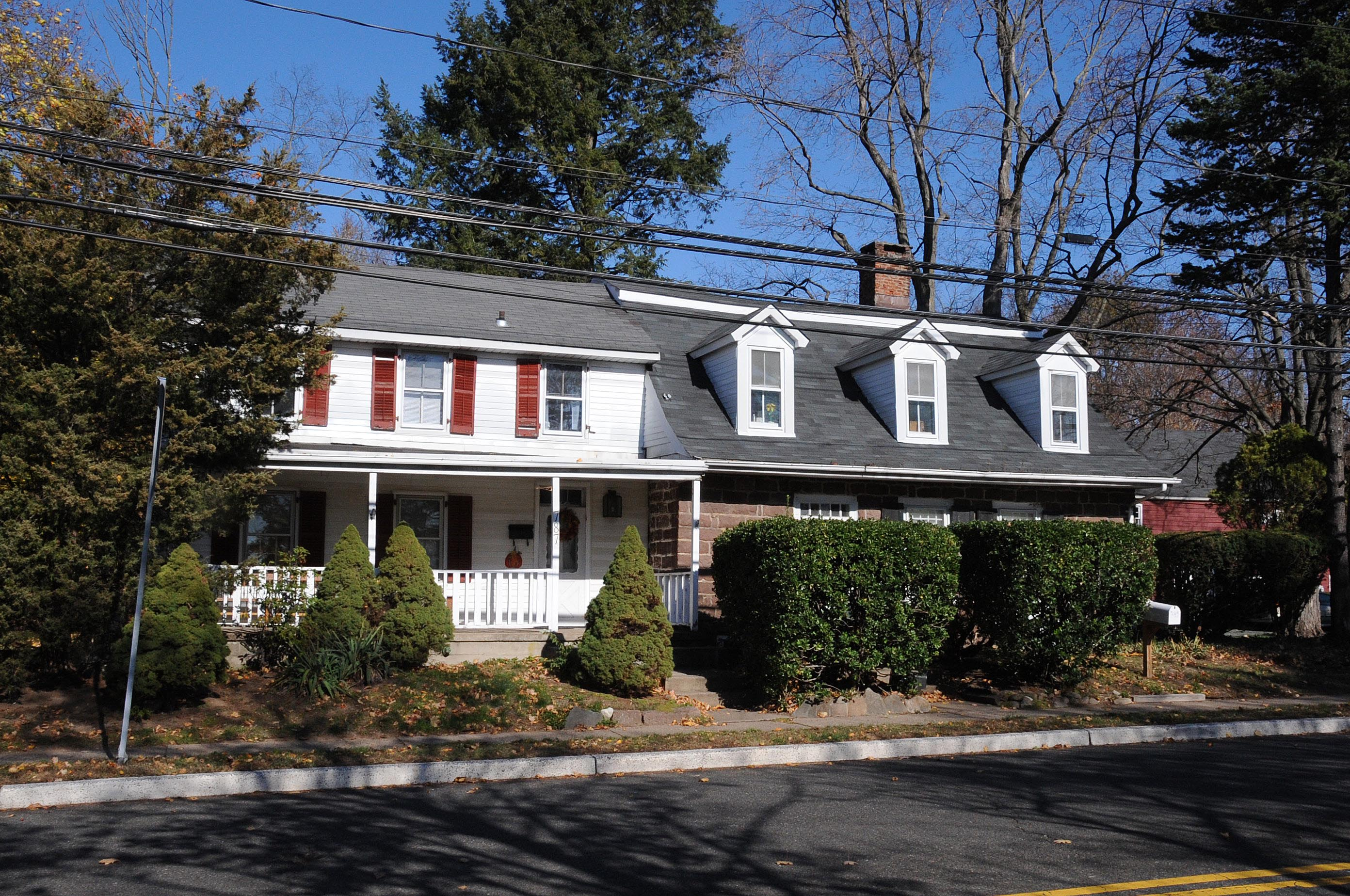

- Location within Bergen County, New Jersey Location within New Jersey Location within the United States
- Location: 789 East Glen Avenue, Ridgewood, New Jersey
- Coordinates: 40°59′3″N 74°5′19″W
- Area: 2.3 acres (0.93 ha)
- MPS: Stone Houses of Bergen County TR
- NRHP reference No.: 83001456
- NJRHP No.: 641

Significant dates
- Added to NRHP: January 10, 1983
- Designated NJRHP: October 3, 1980

The Ackerman–Van Emburgh House is a historic stone house located at 789 East Glen Avenue in the village of Ridgewood in Bergen County, New Jersey, United States. The house was added to the National Register of Historic Places on January 10, 1983, for its significance in architecture and exploration/settlement. It was listed as part of the Early Stone Houses of Bergen County Multiple Property Submission (MPS).

Based on architectural evidence, the house was built in the 18th century or early 19th century by a member of the Ackerman family. It was sold to John Van Emburgh, who later sold it to his brother, Henry Van Emburgh. The one and one-half story house features a gambrel roof.

== See also ==
- National Register of Historic Places listings in Ridgewood, New Jersey
- National Register of Historic Places listings in Bergen County, New Jersey
