= Ackerman House (222 Doremus Avenue, Ridgewood, New Jersey) =

Historic house in New Jersey, United States

- U.S. National Register of Historic Places
- New Jersey Register of Historic Places
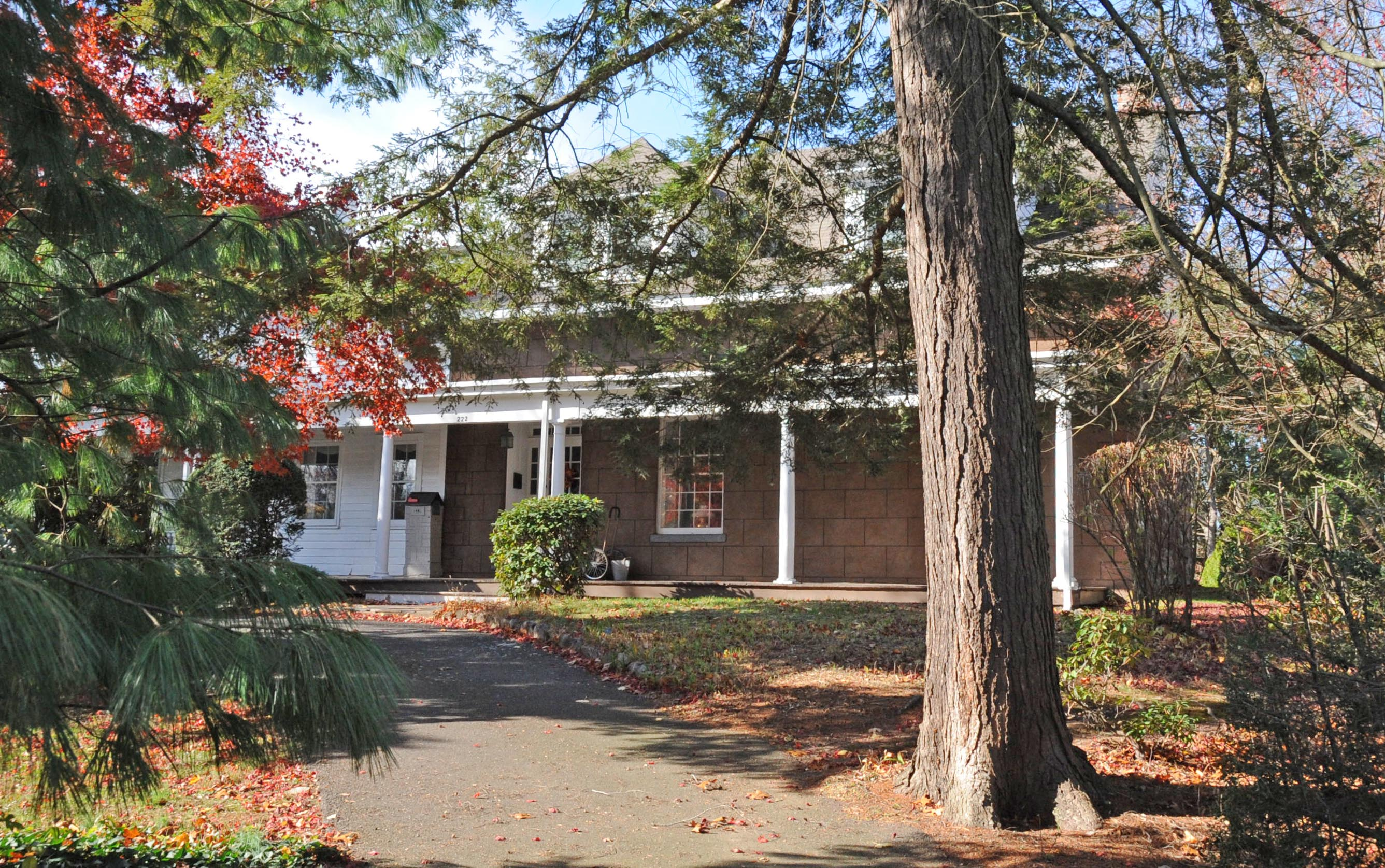

- Location within Bergen County, New Jersey Location within New Jersey Location within the United States
- Location: 222 Doremus Avenue, Ridgewood, New Jersey
- Coordinates: 40°58′23″N 74°7′37″W
- MPS: Stone Houses of Bergen County TR
- NRHP reference No.: 83001450
- NJRHP No.: 642

Significant dates
- Added to NRHP: January 10, 1983
- Designated NJRHP: October 3, 1980

The Ackerman House is a historic stone house located at 222 Doremus Avenue in the village of Ridgewood in Bergen County, New Jersey, United States. The house was added to the National Register of Historic Places on January 10, 1983, for its significance in architecture. It was listed as part of the Early Stone Houses of Bergen County Multiple Property Submission (MPS).

The house was likely built in the 18th century by a member of the Ackerman family. The one and one-half story house features a gable roof.

== See also ==
- National Register of Historic Places listings in Ridgewood, New Jersey
- National Register of Historic Places listings in Bergen County, New Jersey
