= David Ackerman House =

Historic house in New Jersey, United States

- U.S. National Register of Historic Places
- New Jersey Register of Historic Places
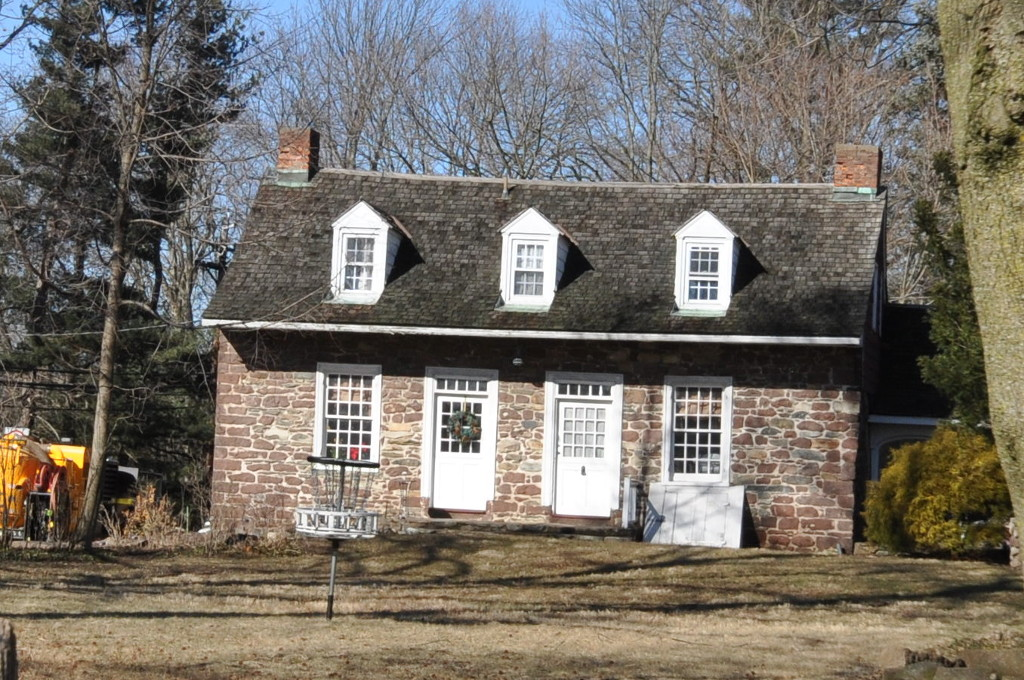

- Location within Bergen County, New Jersey Location within New Jersey Location within the United States
- Location: 415 E. Saddle River Road, Ridgewood, New Jersey
- Coordinates: 40.9846°N 74.0887°W
- Built: c. 1750–1760
- Built by: David A. Ackerman; Garret D. Ackerman
- Architectural style: Colonial
- MPS: Stone Houses of Bergen County TR
- NRHP reference No.: 83001448
- NJRHP No.: 640

Significant dates
- Added to NRHP: January 10, 1983
- Designated NJRHP: October 3, 1980

The David Ackerman House is a historic stone house located at 415 E. Saddle River Road in the village of Ridgewood in Bergen County, United States. It was built around 1750–1760. It was documented as the David Ackerman-Naugle House by the Historic American Buildings Survey (HABS) in 1936. The house was added to the National Register of Historic Places on January 10, 1983, for its significance in architecture and exploration/settlement. It was listed as part of the Early Stone Houses of Bergen County Multiple Property Submission (MPS).

The house was built by either David A. Ackerman or his son, Garret D. Ackerman. Garret's son, David G. Ackerman (1744–1831) inherited the house in 1774. His son, Abraham D. Ackerman, inherited it in 1831. David B. Naugle bought the house in 1861.

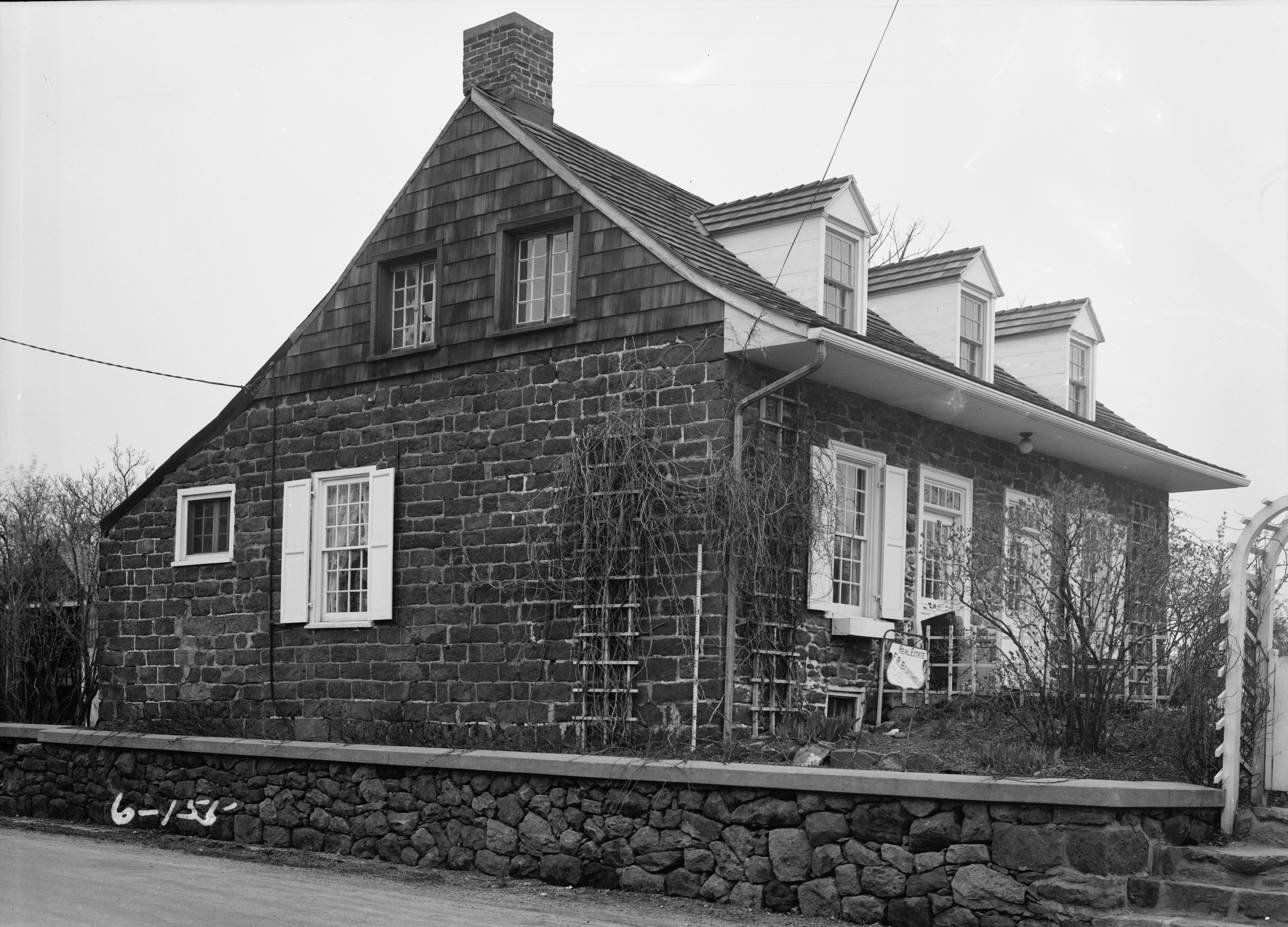
HABS photo from 1936

== See also ==
- National Register of Historic Places listings in Ridgewood, New Jersey
- National Register of Historic Places listings in Bergen County, New Jersey
