= Vanderbeck House (Ridgewood, New Jersey) =

Historic house in New Jersey, United States

- U.S. National Register of Historic Places
- New Jersey Register of Historic Places
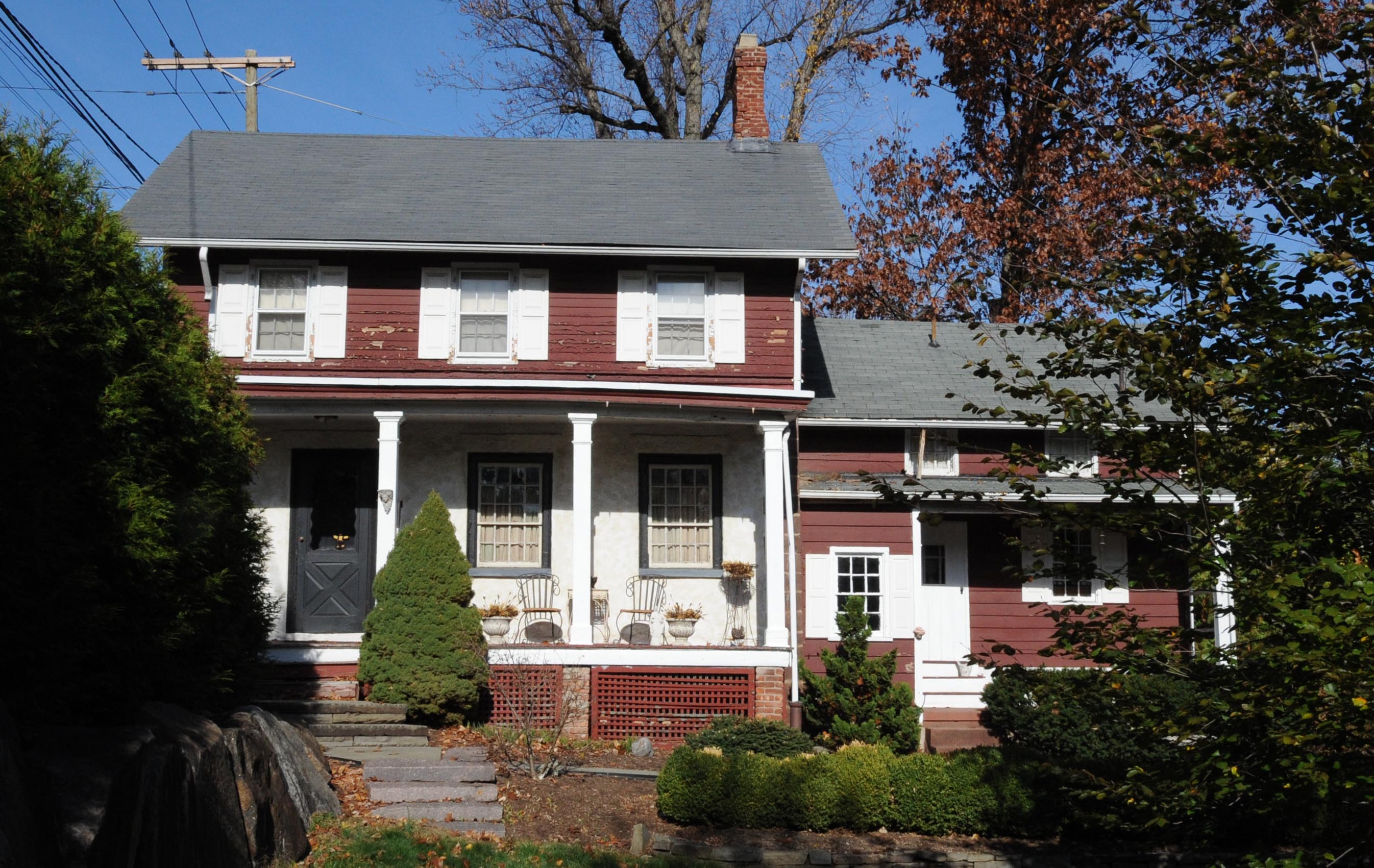

- Location within Bergen County, New Jersey Location within New Jersey Location within the United States
- Location: 249 Prospect Street, Ridgewood, New Jersey
- Coordinates: 40°58′25″N 74°7′1″W
- Built: c. 1790
- MPS: Stone Houses of Bergen County TR
- NRHP reference No.: 83001564
- NJRHP No.: 648

Significant dates
- Added to NRHP: January 10, 1983
- Designated NJRHP: October 3, 1980

The Vanderbeck House is located at 249 Prospect Street in the village of Ridgewood in Bergen County, New Jersey, United States. The historic stone house was built around 1790, based on architectural evidence, by a member of the Vanderbeck family. It was added to the National Register of Historic Places on January 10, 1983, for its significance in architecture. It was listed as part of the Early Stone Houses of Bergen County Multiple Property Submission (MPS).

== See also ==
- National Register of Historic Places listings in Ridgewood, New Jersey
- National Register of Historic Places listings in Bergen County, New Jersey
