= Archibald–Vroom House =

Historic house in New Jersey, United States

- U.S. National Register of Historic Places
- New Jersey Register of Historic Places
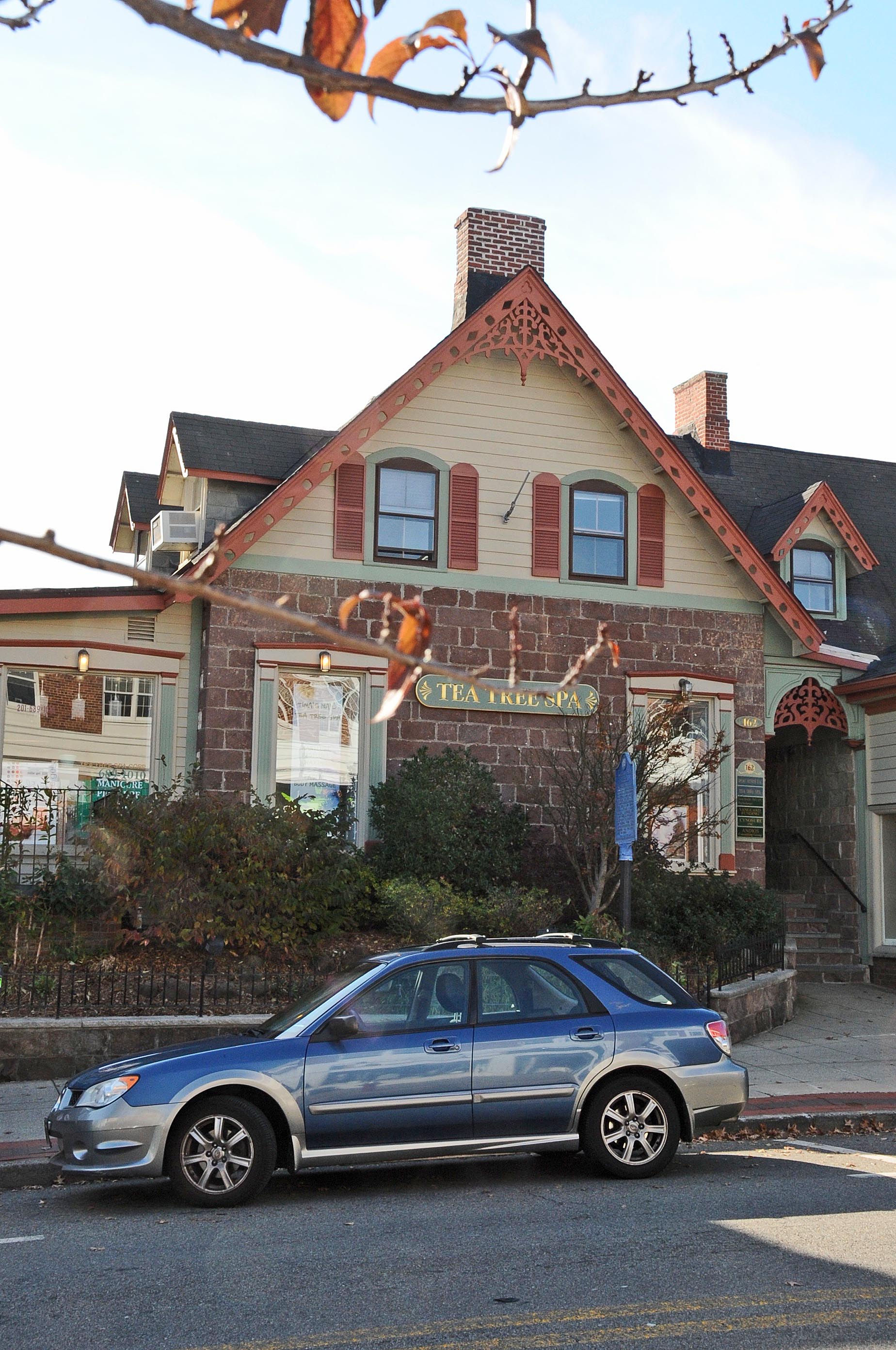
- Archibald-Vroom House in 2015

- Location within Bergen County, New Jersey Location within New Jersey Location within the United States
- Location: 160 East Ridgewood Avenue, Ridgewood, New Jersey
- Coordinates: 40°58′43″N 74°6′58″W
- Built: c. 1785–1790
- MPS: Stone Houses of Bergen County TR
- NRHP reference No.: 84002596
- NJRHP No.: 650

Significant dates
- Added to NRHP: July 24, 1984
- Designated NJRHP: October 3, 1980

The Archibald–Vroom House is located at 160 East Ridgewood Avenue in the village of Ridgewood in Bergen County, New Jersey, United States. The historic stone house was added to the National Register of Historic Places on July 24, 1984, for its significance in architecture and exploration/settlement. Based on architectural evidence, it was built from around 1785 to 1790. It was listed as part of the Early Stone Houses of Bergen County Multiple Property Submission (MPS). Dr. William L. Vroom, a renowned physician, converted the house into a small hospital in 1888. The house is now used as a retail site.

== See also ==
- National Register of Historic Places listings in Ridgewood, New Jersey
- National Register of Historic Places listings in Bergen County, New Jersey
