= Westervelt–Cameron House =

Historic house in New Jersey, United States

- U.S. National Register of Historic Places
- New Jersey Register of Historic Places
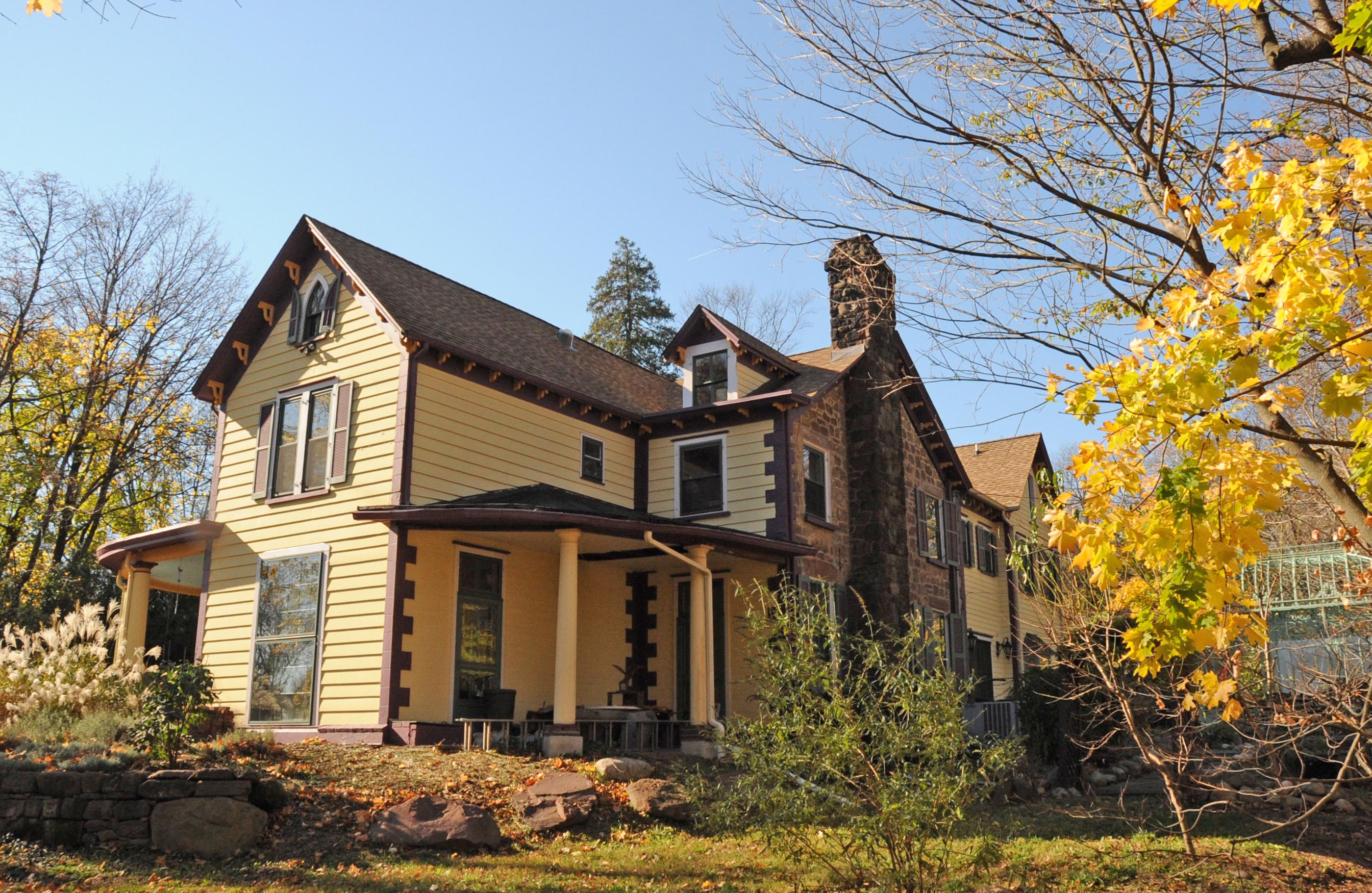

- Location within Bergen County, New Jersey Location within New Jersey Location within the United States
- Location: 26 East Glen Avenue, Ridgewood, New Jersey
- Coordinates: 40°59′21″N 74°6′54″W
- Built: c. 1767
- MPS: Stone Houses of Bergen County TR
- NRHP reference No.: 83001581
- NJRHP No.: 651

Significant dates
- Added to NRHP: January 10, 1983
- Designated NJRHP: October 3, 1980

The Westervelt–Cameron House is located at 26 East Glen Avenue in the village of Ridgewood in Bergen County, New Jersey, United States. The house was built around 1767 and was added to the National Register of Historic Places on January 10, 1983, for its significance in architecture and exploration/settlement. It was listed as part of the Early Stone Houses of Bergen County Multiple Property Submission (MPS).

According to the nomination form, the house was built by Johannis R. Westervelt. His son, John W. Westervelt, owned it in 1817. Later owners sold it to Alexander and Catharine Cameron, who enlarged it.

== See also ==
- National Register of Historic Places listings in Ridgewood, New Jersey
- National Register of Historic Places listings in Bergen County, New Jersey
