= Van Dien House =

Historic house in New Jersey, United States

- U.S. National Register of Historic Places
- New Jersey Register of Historic Places
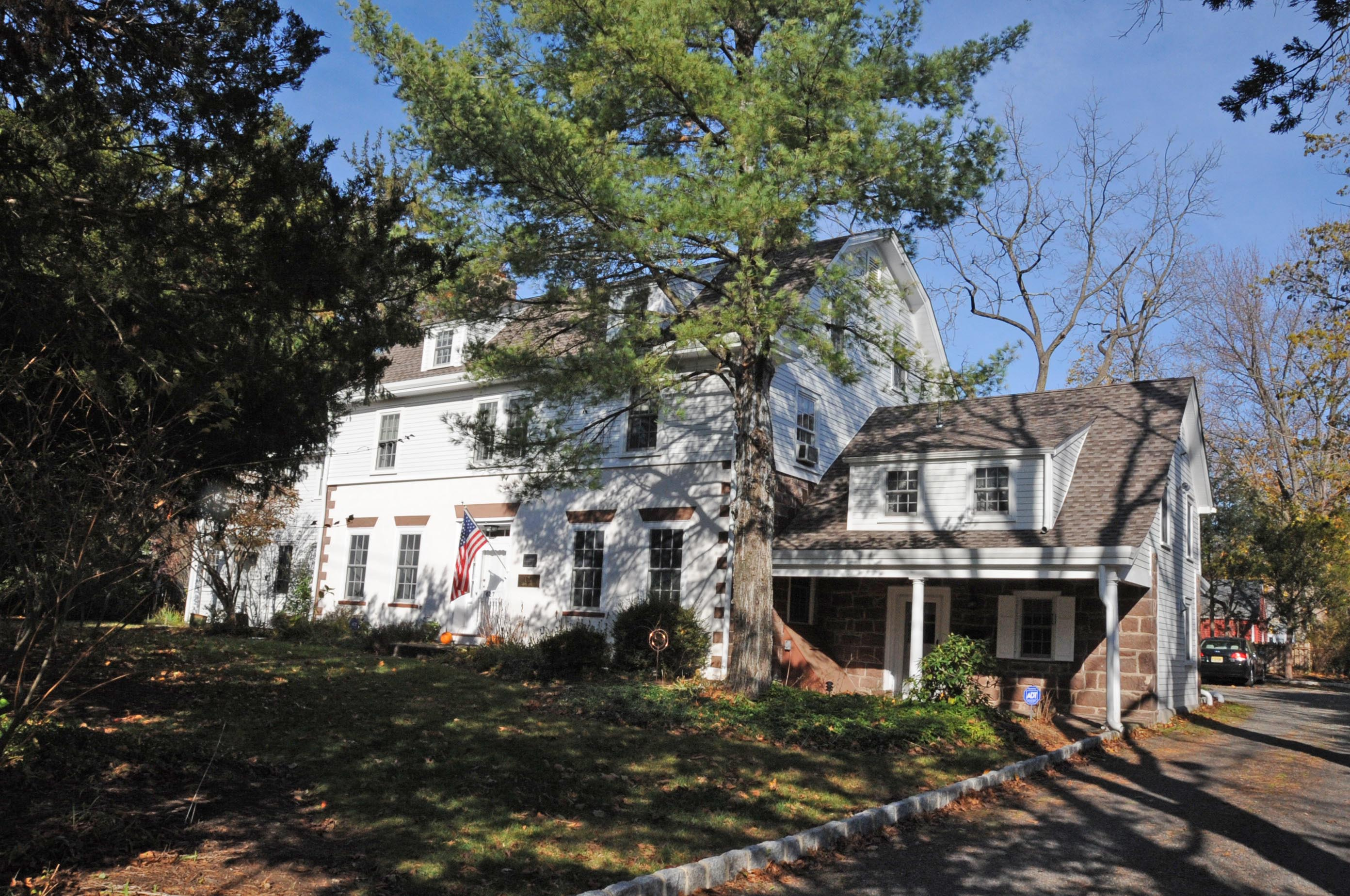

- Location within Bergen County, New Jersey Location within New Jersey Location within the United States
- Location: 627 Grove Street, Ridgewood, New Jersey
- Coordinates: 40°57′59″N 74°6′3″W
- MPS: Stone Houses of Bergen County TR
- NRHP reference No.: 83001567
- NJRHP No.: 649

Significant dates
- Added to NRHP: January 10, 1983
- Designated NJRHP: October 3, 1980

The Van Dien House is located at 627 Grove Street in the village of Ridgewood in Bergen County, New Jersey, United States. The historic stone house was added to the National Register of Historic Places on January 10, 1983, for its significance in architecture. It was listed as part of the Early Stone Houses of Bergen County Multiple Property Submission (MPS).

According to the nomination form, the house was built in the last quarter of the 18th century, based on architectural evidence, by a member of the Van Dien family. J. R. Van Dien was living here in 1861, and 1876. L. M. Barnett was living here in 1912. A second level frame section has been added over the stone section.

== See also ==
- National Register of Historic Places listings in Ridgewood, New Jersey
- National Register of Historic Places listings in Bergen County, New Jersey
- Harmon Van Dien House
