= Paramus Reformed Church Historic District =

Historic church in New Jersey, United States

- U.S. National Register of Historic Places
- U.S. Historic district
- New Jersey Register of Historic Places
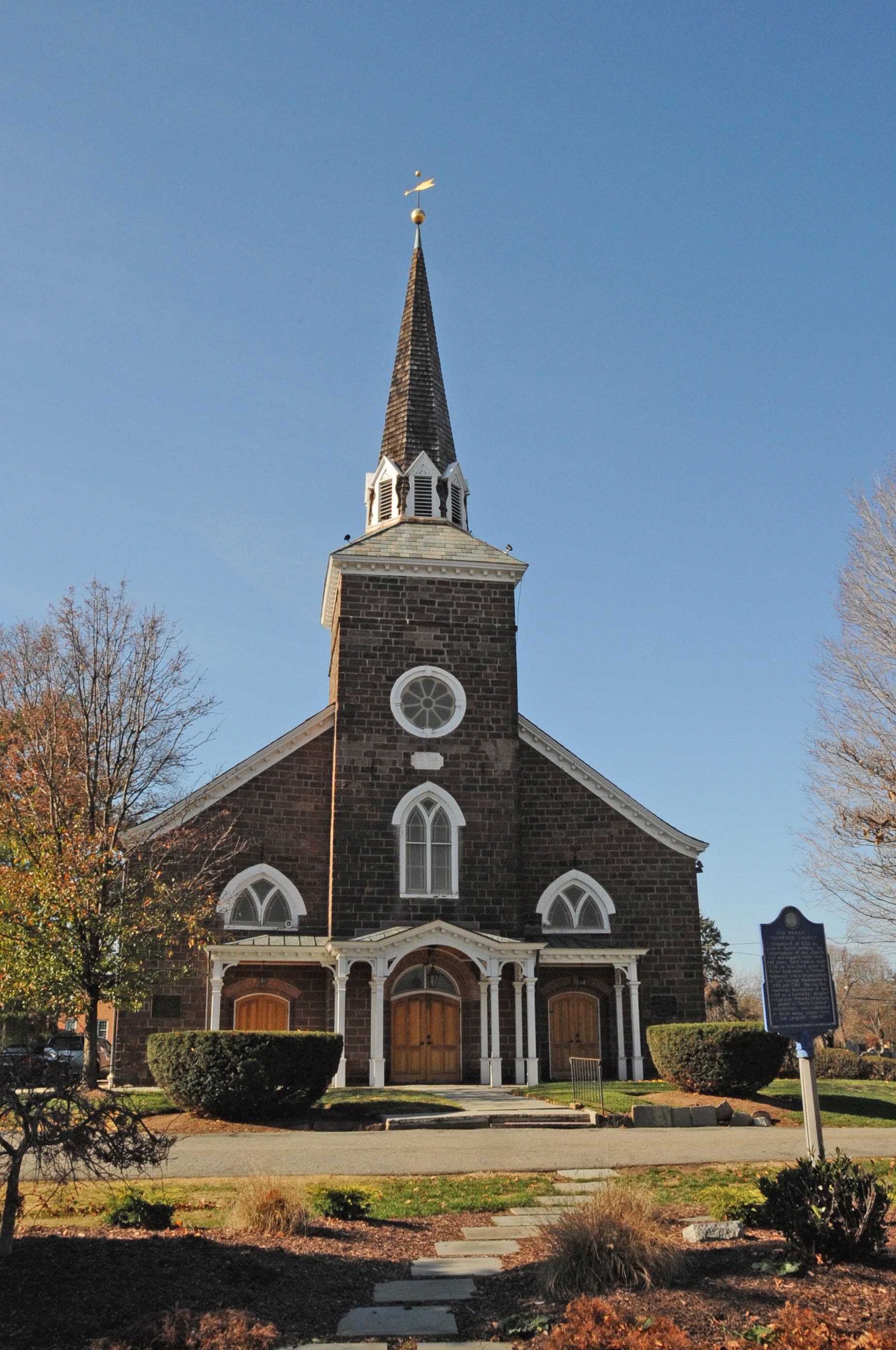
- Old Paramus Reformed Church in 2015

- Location within Bergen County, New Jersey Location within New Jersey Location within the United States
- Location: 660 East Glen Avenue, Ridgewood, New Jersey
- Coordinates: 40°59′9.38″N 74°5′38.68″W
- Area: 39 acres (16 ha)
- Architectural style: Late Victorian
- NRHP reference No.: 75001121
- NJRHP No.: 644

Significant dates
- Added to NRHP: February 25, 1975
- Designated NJRHP: November 13, 1974

The Paramus Reformed Church Historic District is a 39-acre (16 ha) historic district encompassing the historic Old Paramus Reformed Church located at 660 East Glen Avenue in the village of Ridgewood in Bergen County, New Jersey, United States. The district was added to the National Register of Historic Places on February 25, 1975, for its significance in architecture, education, military history, and religion. It includes three contributing buildings: the church, parsonage, and education buildings; and two contributing sites: the Old Paramus Reformed Church Cemetery and the Valleau Cemetery.

== Church history ==
The congregation was established in 1725 by Dutch settlers. The stone church was built in 1800, replacing an earlier building from 1735 and using the stones of the old church. The church also has a small gated cemetery with graves of Dutch ancestors and a path that leads to a nearby residential street.

The church was used as a hospital, barrack and prison in the Revolutionary War. The church is currently still in use.

On November 16 and December 26, 2014, Joseph Galli of Somerville allegedly used a high powered AR-15 rifle to shoot inside the church. This led to the breaking of a stained glass window dating back to 1875. He and Alexander Norell were charged with more than $2,000 in property damage and indicted for gun charges with an assault rifle.

== See also ==
- National Register of Historic Places listings in Ridgewood, New Jersey
- National Register of Historic Places listings in Bergen County, New Jersey
- List of Washington's Headquarters during the Revolutionary War
