= James C. Rose =

American landscape architect (1913-1991)

James C. Rose (1913–1991) was a prominent landscape architect and author of the twentieth century. Born in rural Pennsylvania he, his mother and older sister moved to New York after his father's death. Rose was a high school dropout, but this didn't stop him from being accepted into Cornell University as an architecture student. Later he transferred to Harvard University as a landscape architecture major. In 1937, he was expelled because his design style didn't fit into Harvard's program. In 1938 and 1939 Rose published a series of articles containing the design experiment ideas that led to his expulsion from Harvard, and Harvard asked him to return. He later published numerous articles and books which heavily impacted design theory and practice in the twentieth century. In 1941, Rose worked for Tuttle, Seelye, Place and Raymond in New York where he became discouraged by the limitations of large public works, and decided that working on private gardens was more suiting to his style. Despite his dislike of the institution of school, Rose would often make appearances as a guest lecturer at schools of landscape architecture and architecture. Before his death he was able to fulfill his lifelong dream of establishing a design study and landscape research center, the James Rose Center. After Rose's death from cancer in 1991, he bequeathed his home in Ridgewood to the James Rose Center.

== Designs and influences ==
One of Rose's first major works while employed at Tuttle, Seelye, Place and Raymond was to design a staging area to house 30,000 men at Camp Kilmer in New Jersey. After this experience, Rose turned his focus to working on private gardens that created an intimate relationship between human beings, nature, and architecture. His designs also created a fusion of indoor and outdoor space. Most of Rose's later works were greatly influenced by the Japanese garden style; he even adopted the religion of Zen Buddhism. The time Rose spent in Okinawa during World War II and his many subsequent visits to Japan, nurtured his fondness for Japanese gardens. Except for his home in Ridgewood in northeast New Jersey, not much of Rose's later works were documented because of his spontaneous design method. His designs were always open to improvisations; they were never finished and continuously transforming form one stage to another. His designs, like his home in Ridgewood, were works in progress. Rose applied a common theory to his designs and described them as “neither landscape nor architecture, but both; neither indoors, nor outdoors, but both.” Ridgewood is Rose's most documented design and is a clear example of his theories and how he applied them to his designs.

On March 7, 2025, Rose's 1985 landscape design for the Texwipe Corporation Headquarters in Upper Saddle River was added to the National Register of Historic Places. Reflecting Rose's Modernist landscape architecture philosophies, the Texwipe design is an example of what he termed a "Corporate Forest" approach to integrating natural landscapes in to corporate campuses.

== Social movements ==
James C. Rose was one of the pioneers of modernism in landscape architecture. While attending Harvard, Rose and his classmates, Garrett Eckbo and Dan Kiley, rebelled against the conventional landscape theory and designs. He refused to conform to the formal style of Beaux-Arts architecture; he saw the landscapes as much more than a pastoral setting for modern buildings. Rose and his classmates fueled the social movement of modernism in Landscape architecture. They teamed up to write several articles about their cause. Through these publications in the Pencil Point magazine, now called Progressive Architecture, and other later articles and books, Rose was able to spread his view on landscape theory and design. Rose also took a stand against the emerging American suburbia and urban planning. He believed these ordered, inorganic projects were useless for domestic living and were degrading to the environment. Rose wrote about suburbia and urban planning in his first book Creative Gardens and also in several published articles.

== Impact on landscape architecture ==
James C. Rose's greatest impact on landscape architecture was as a catalyst for the modernism movement. His influence was spread to the populace because of the emerging power of the media. The designs he created, though wonderful and expressive of his design theories, had less of an influence on landscape architecture than the many books and articles he wrote.

== Books by James Rose ==
- Rose, James C. Creative Gardens. New York: Reinhold Publishing Corporation; 1958.
- Rose, James C. Gardens Make Me Laugh. Norwalk, CT: Silvermine Publishers; 1965.
- Rose, James C. The Heavenly Environment. Hong Kong: New City Cultural Service, LTD; 1987.
- Snow, Marc. Modern American Gardens. New York: Reinhold Publishing Corp.; 1967.

== Articles by James Rose ==
(Note: Pencil Points magazine is now Progressive Architecture.)

- Rose, James C. "Are You a Plant Snob." California Arts and Architecture. April 1941; 58:30, 46.
- Rose, James C. "Articulate Form in Landscape Design." Pencil Points. February 1939, 20: 98- 100. Reprinted as: Rose, James C. "Articulate Form in Landscape Design." in Modern Landscape Architecture. ed. Marc Treib. Cambridge: The MIT Press; 1991.
- Rose, James C. "Bogeys in the Landscape." California Arts and Architecture. November 1940; 57: 27, 38.
- Rose, James C. "Freedom in the Garden." Pencil Points. October 1938, 19: 640–644.
- Rose, James C. "Freedom in the Garden." in Modern Landscape Architecture. ed. Marc Treib. Cambridge: The MIT Press; 1991.
- Rose, James C. "Gardens." California Arts and Architecture. May 1940; 57.
- Rose, James C. "Garden Details." California Arts and Architecture. July 1941; 58: 28–29,38-39.
- Rose, James C. "The Hanging Garden." California Arts and Architecture. August 1940; 57;25, 37.
- Rose, James C. "Hillside House Solves the Difficult Problem of Solar Orientation." Architectural Forum. April 1947; 86: 126–128.
- Rose, James C. "House in Pasadena, California." Architectural Forum. November 1946; 85:90-93.
- Rose, James C. "Idyll in Electronic Factory." Interiors. July 1963: 69–72.
- Rose, James C. "Integration." Pencil Points. December 1938; 19:758-760.
- Rose, James C. "Landscape Models." Pencil Points. July 1939, 20: 438–448.
- Rose, James C. "Modular Gardens." Progressive Architecture. September 1947: 76–80.
- Rose, James C. "My Connecticut Home and Gardens Began in Okinawa." American Home. October 1946; 36: 20–22.
- Rose, James C. "1+1=5." California Arts and Architecture. June/July 1940; 57: 38, 46.

== Bibliography ==
- Cardasis, Dean (1994). "Maverick" (PDF). Masters of American Garden Design III: “The Modern Garden in Europe and the United States”. The Garden Conservancy Symposium. March 1994.
- Cardasis, Dean (2017). James Rose. Amherst, MA: Library of American Landscape History; Athens, GA: University of Georgia Press
- Rogers, Elizabeth Barlow (2001). Landscape Design; A Cultural and Architectural History, p. 454. New York: Harry N. Abrams Inc.
- "Rose, James C.". Retrieved from the Web on 10-20-2005. https://web.archive.org/web/20041229015436/http://www.cartage.org.lb/en/themes/Biographies/MainBiographies/R/Rosejames/rose.htm
- The James Rose Center (2001). The James Rose Center for landscape architecture and design research. Retrieved from the Web on 10-20-2005. http://www.jamesrosecenter.org/index.html
- Tom Turner (1998). "James Rose - biographical information." Retrieved from the Web 10-20-2005. http://www.gardenvisit.com/b/rose2.htm
