= Texwipe Corporation Headquarters =

- U.S. National Register of Historic Places
- U.S. Historic district
- New Jersey Register of Historic Places
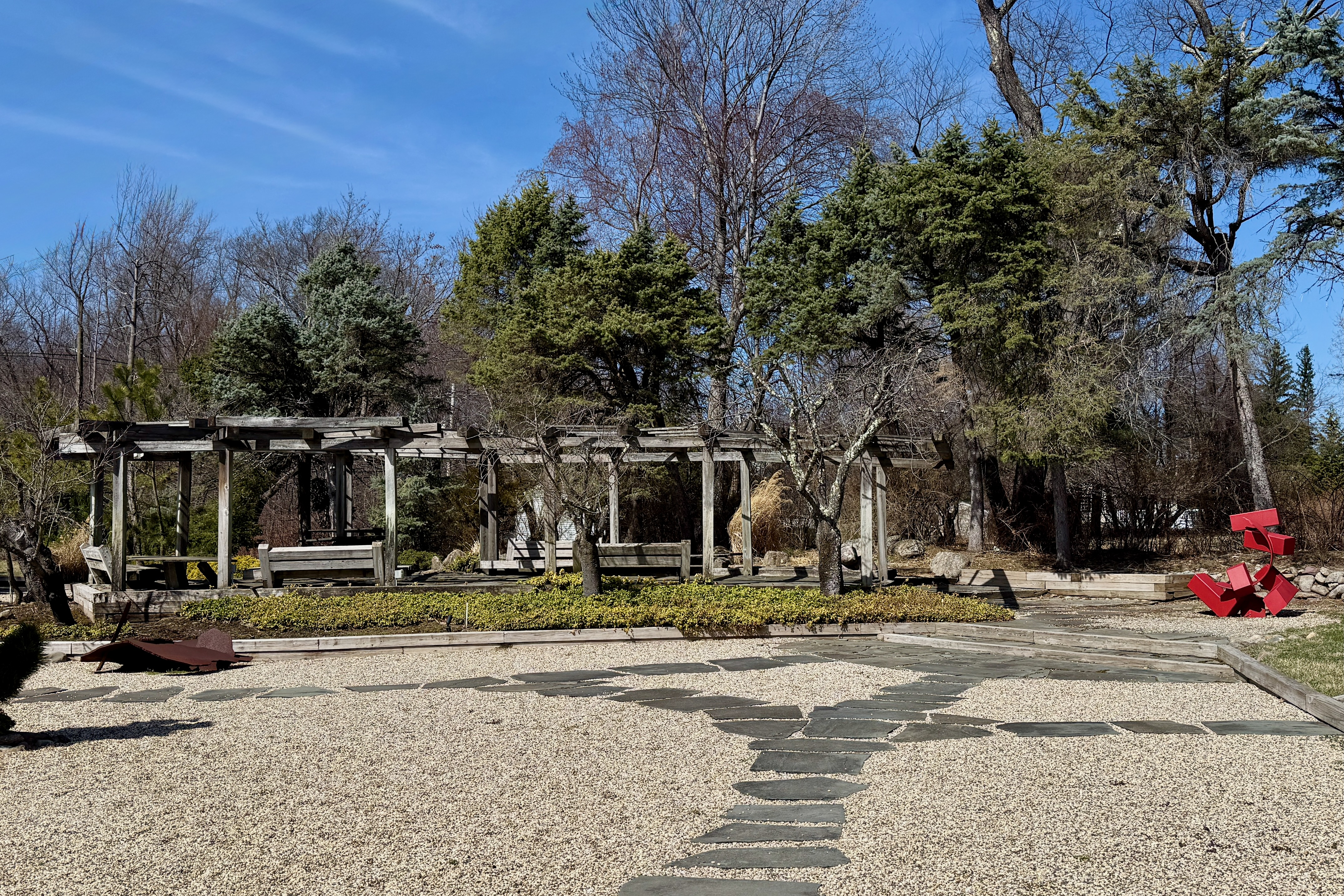
- Tea House at Texwipe Corporation Headquarters

- Location within Bergen County, New Jersey Location within New Jersey Location within the United States
- Location: 650 East Crescent Avenue, Upper Saddle River, New Jersey
- Coordinates: 41°4′9″N 74°7′13″W
- Area: 10.6 acres (4.3 ha)
- Built: 1985
- Architects: James C. Rose, Landscape Architect
- Architectural style: Modernist landscape
- NRHP reference No.: 100011489
- NJRHP No.: 5912

Significant dates
- Added to NRHP: March 7, 2025
- Designated NJRHP: January 14, 2025

Texwipe Corporation Headquarters, also known as EarthCam World Headquarters, landscape is a 10.6-acre (4.3 ha) historic district located at 650 East Crescent Avenue in the borough of Upper Saddle River in Bergen County, New Jersey, United States. It was added to the National Register of Historic Places on March 7, 2025, for its significance in landscape architecture. It includes one contributing building, one contributing site, one contributing structure, and twenty five contributing objects.

== History and description ==
The campus was designed by landscape architect James C. Rose, commissioned by the founder of Texwipe, Edward Paley. Rose supervised construction of this Modernist landscape project in 1985. He called the design a "Corporate Forest", combining the natural and corporate worlds. Landscape elements include a Tea House, timber bridge, fountains and earth mounds with sculptures. The building is now owned by the EarthCam Corporation.

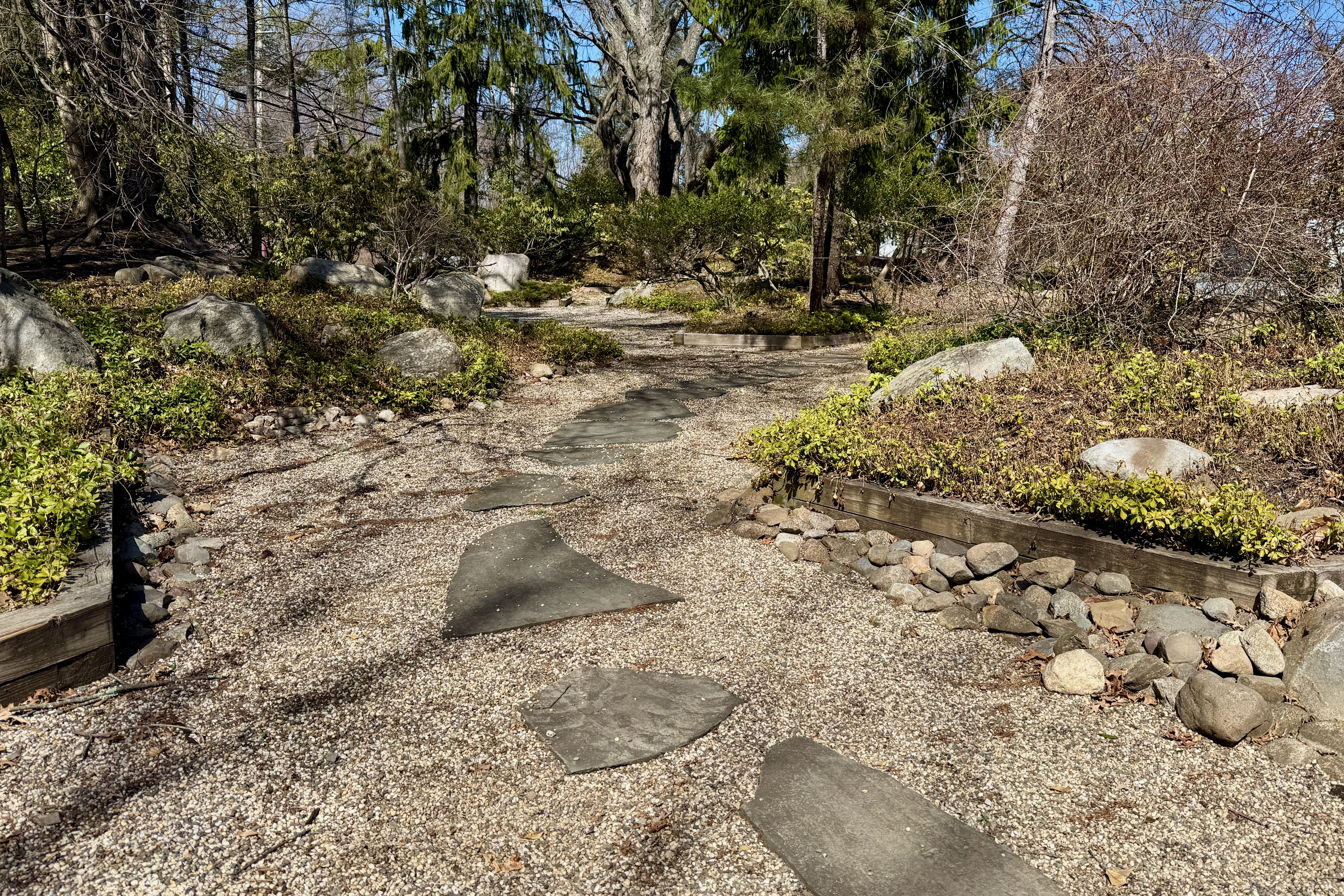
Landscaped flagstone path

== See also ==
- National Register of Historic Places listings in Bergen County, New Jersey
