= Harmon Van Dien House =

Historic house in New Jersey, United States

- U.S. National Register of Historic Places
- New Jersey Register of Historic Places
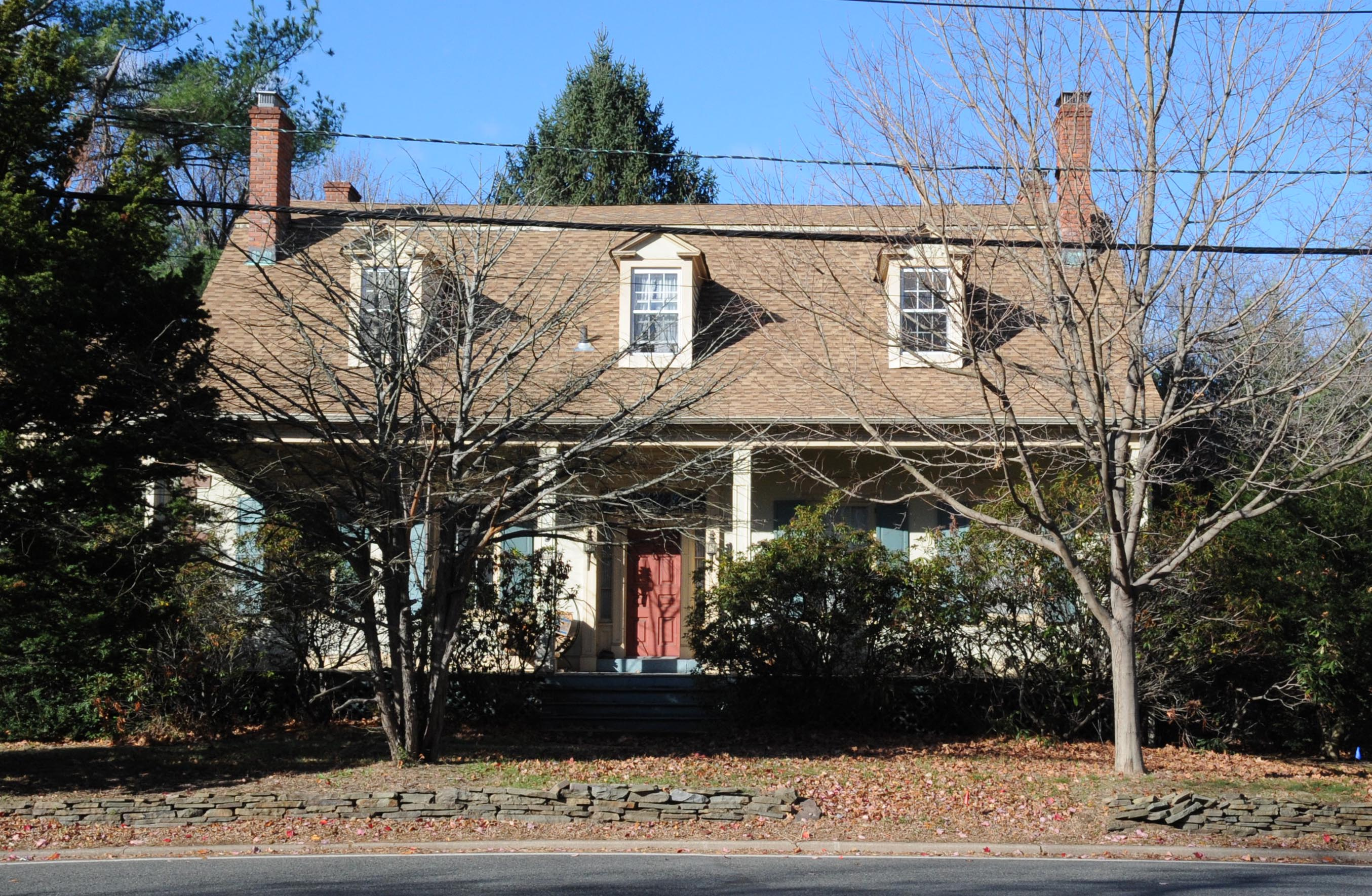

- Location within Bergen County, New Jersey Location within New Jersey Location within the United States
- Location: 449 Paramus Road, Paramus, New Jersey
- Coordinates: 40°57′23″N 74°5′40″W
- Area: 2 acres (0.81 ha)
- Built: 1811
- MPS: Stone Houses of Bergen County TR
- NRHP reference No.: 83001561
- NJRHP No.: 619

Significant dates
- Added to NRHP: January 10, 1983
- Designated NJRHP: October 3, 1980

Harmon Van Dien House is located in Paramus, Bergen County, New Jersey, United States. The house was built in 1811 and was added to the National Register of Historic Places on January 10, 1983.

== See also ==
- National Register of Historic Places listings in Bergen County, New Jersey
