= Ridgewood Public Schools =

School district in Bergen County, New Jersey, US

Address
- 49 Cottage Place Ridgewood, Bergen County, New Jersey, 07450; United States
- Coordinates: 40.98151°N 74.112579°W

District information
- Grades: PreK-12
- Superintendent: Mark Schwarz
- Business administrator: Richard Matthews
- Schools: 10

Students and staff
- Enrollment: 5,438 (as of 2024–25)
- Faculty: 448.0 FTEs
- Student–teacher ratio: 12.0:1

Other information
- District Factor Group: J
- Website: www.rpsnj.us
Ind.	Per pupil	District spending	Rank (*)	K-12 average	%± vs. average
1A	Total Spending	$17,982	44	$18,891	−4.8%
1	Budgetary Cost	13,979	41	14,783	−5.4%
2	Classroom Instruction	8,343	35	8,763	−4.8%
6	Support Services	2,575	75	2,392	7.7%
8	Administrative Cost	1,312	28	1,485	−11.6%
10	Operations & Maintenance	1,508	36	1,783	−15.4%
13	Extracurricular Activities	229	46	268	−14.6%
16	Median Teacher Salary	78,193	95	64,043
Data from NJDoE 2014 Taxpayers' Guide to Education Spending. *Of K-12 districts with more than 3,500 students. Lowest spending=1; Highest=103

The Ridgewood Public Schools is a comprehensive community public school district serving students in pre-kindergarten through twelfth grade from suburban Ridgewood, in Bergen County, in the U.S. state of New Jersey.

As of the 2020–21 school year, the district, comprised of 10 schools, had an enrollment of 5,613 students and 432.6 classroom teachers (on an FTE basis), for a student–teacher ratio of 13.0:1.

The district had been classified by the New Jersey Department of Education as being in District Factor Group "J", the highest of eight groupings. District Factor Groups organize districts statewide to allow comparison by common socioeconomic characteristics of the local districts. From lowest socioeconomic status to highest, the categories are A, B, CD, DE, FG, GH, I and J.

== Awards, recognition and rankings ==
Benjamin Franklin Middle School was awarded the Blue Ribbon School Award of Excellence by the United States Department of Education, the highest award an American school can receive, during the 1998-99 school year.

For the 1993-94 school year, George Washington Middle School was named a "Star School" by the New Jersey Department of Education, the highest honor that a New Jersey school can achieve. For the 1995-96 school year, Benjamin Franklin Middle School was named a "Star School".

The district's high school was the 28th-ranked public high school in New Jersey out of 339 schools statewide in New Jersey Monthly magazine's September 2014 cover story on the state's "Top Public High Schools", using a new ranking methodology. The school had been ranked 28th in the state of 328 schools in 2012, after being ranked 20th in 2010 out of 322 schools listed.

== Schools ==
Schools in the district (with 2020–21 enrollment data from the National Center for Education Statistics) are:

Pre-school

- Glen School with 60 students in PreK and Private Day Care Center

Elementary schools

- Henrietta Hawes Elementary School with 593 students in grades K–5
  - Shauna Stovell, principal
- Orchard Elementary School with 299 students in grades K–5
  - Mary K. Ferreri, principal
- Ridge Elementary School with 443 students in grades K–5
  - Justin Jasper, principal
- Irwin B. Somerville Elementary School with 383 students in grades K–5
  - Lorna Oates-Santos, principal
- Ira W. Travell Elementary School with 377 students in grades K–5
  - Lauren Carr, principal
- Willard Elementary School with 461 students in grades K–5
  - Carolinev Hoffman, principal

Middle schools

- Benjamin Franklin Middle School with 698 students in grades 6–8
  - Stacey Wisniewski, principal
- George Washington Middle School with 666 students in grades 6–8
  - David Bailey, principal

High school

- Ridgewood High School with 1,775 students in grades 9–12
  - Jeffrey M. Nyhuis, principal

== Athletics ==
Ridgewood High School's sports teams are nicknamed the Maroons. Ridgewood High School is one of 41 public and private high schools from Bergen, Essex and Passaic counties that are members of the Big North Conference.

== Administration ==
Core members of the school district's administration include:

- Mark Schwarz, superintendent
- Richard Matthews, business administrator and board secretary

== Superintendent search ==
The Ridgewood Board of Education had been searching for a new superintendent since July 1, 2006, with Paul Arilotta, previously Principal of Travell School, serving as an interim replacement during the year-long search. The Board hired Martin Brooks as superintendent, effective July 1, 2007. However, in mid-June, Brooks declined the invitation for what the board described as personal reasons, though there was community opposition to Brooks' appointment that was said to have made him "feel unwelcome". This has led to the beginning of another search, and another year of the district hiring an interim superintendent, until a permanent replacement is hired and assumes the position. The New York Times reported that this is the result of a dispute over the district's reform math program.

Daniel Fishbein, a Ridgewood parent and previous superintendent of the Glen Ridge Public Schools, served as superintendent from 2008 to 2020.

In December 2020, Thomas Gorman, then principal of Ridgewood High school stepped in as interim superintendent. In March 2021, he was formally appointed to the position of superintendent of schools.

== Board of education ==
The district's board of education, is comprised of five elected trustees, currently President Michael Lembo, Vice President HyunJu Kwak, Sheila Brogan, Saurabh Dani, and Cristopher Kaufman. The board sets policy and oversees the fiscal and educational operation of the district through its administration. As a Type II school district, the board's trustees are elected directly by voters to serve three-year terms of office on a staggered basis, with either one or two seats up for election each year held (since 2021) as part of the November general election. The board appoints a superintendent to oversee the district's day-to-day operations and a business administrator to supervise the business functions of the district.

In a November 2020 referendum, voters supported by a nearly 3-2 margin an initiative that moved both Ridgewood's school elections (from April) and municipal elections (from May) to November .

== Global learning ==
Ridgewood Public Schools participated in the "Rural School Project". The goal of the project is to build a school for children in Cambodia to overcome the challenges their people have faced from the genocide at the hands of the Khmer Rouge, the communist political party, in the 1970s. George Washington Middle School, Benjamin Franklin Middle School, Orchard Elementary School, and Travell Elementary School participated in the student-centered fundraising effort. Ridgewood focused on having students tap into their strengths and talents to make a difference on a global level.

Ridgewood Public Schools began the fundraising effort in the summer of 2007, in collaboration with parents, to participate in the Rural School Project. The Rural School Project is funded through a nonprofit organization, The American Assistance for Cambodia/Japan Relief for Cambodia (AAfC). The project was initiated by two Ridgewood parents. Students, parents, teachers, and administrators convened regularly to provide support for students and articulating the effort across the entire district. The goal of the program was to initially raise $21,500 for the school construction. Nominal fundraising efforts would take place after the school's inception to sustain its progress. Ridgewood Schools is raising funds in collaboration with American Assistance for Cambodia/Japan Relief for Cambodia (AAfC). AAfC is a nonprofit organization and has established a proven program. It has led the effort to construct over 300 Cambodian schools with matching funds from the World Bank and Asian Development Bank.

The Ridgewood Village School will create a structure for Ridgewood students to communicate with Cambodian students via email and participate in global citizenship and distance learning. Ongoing fundraising efforts will allow the Ridgewood Village School to build a water well, create a vegetable garden, and hire a full-time cook for the school to provide a nutritious breakfast and lunch for Cambodian students.

The fundraising supported the construction cost of a rural school (includes the building, desks, chairs), a full-time trained English/computer teacher for 2 years, 3 solar panels to provide basic electric for lighting and computers, and books.

In February 2009, several representatives from Ridgewood, including students, parents, teachers, and administrators, visited the Ridgewood Village School in Cambodia for the ribbon-cutting ceremony. The representatives brought gifts for students and contributed to the improvement of the village.
