= Ridgewood, New Jersey =

Village in Bergen County, New Jersey, US

- Village
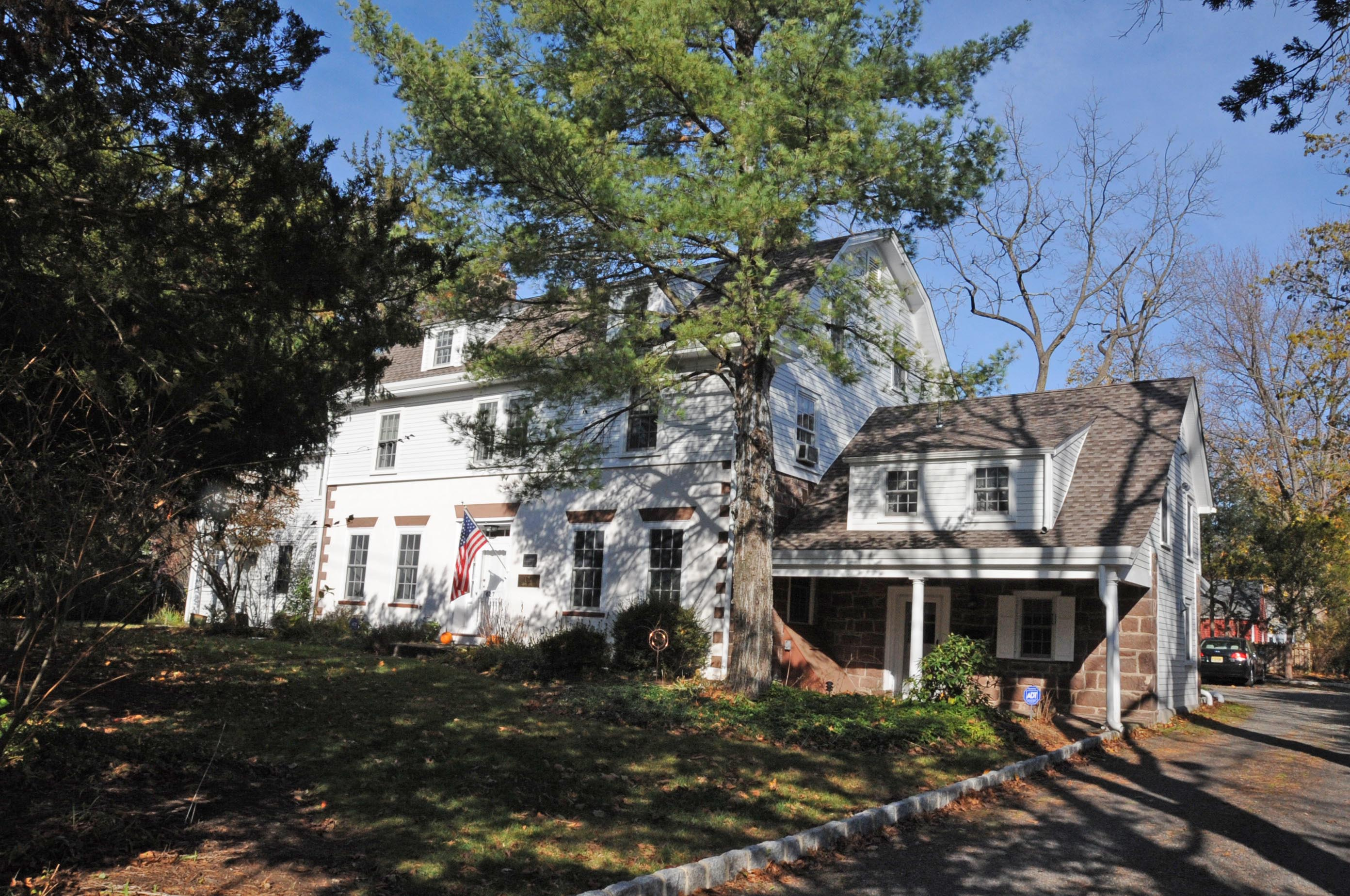
- Van Dien House in Ridgewood

- Location of Ridgewood in Bergen County highlighted in red (left). Inset map: Location of Bergen County in New Jersey highlighted in orange (right).
- Interactive map of Ridgewood, New Jersey
- Location in Bergen County Location in New Jersey Location in the United States
- Coordinates: 40.981591°N 74.113506°W
- Country: United States
- State: New Jersey
- County: Bergen
- Incorporated: November 20, 1894

Government
  - Type: Faulkner Act Council-Manager
  - Body: Village Council
  - Mayor: Paul Vagianos (term ends December 31, 2026)
  - Manager: Keith Kazmark
  - Municipal clerk: Heather Mailander

Area
  - Total: 5.80 sq mi (15.03 km^{2})
  - Land: 5.74 sq mi (14.87 km^{2})
  - Water: 0.062 sq mi (0.16 km^{2}) 1.07%
  - Rank: 262nd of 565 in state 8th of 70 in county
- Elevation: 85 ft (26 m)

Population (2020)
  - Total: 25,979
  - Estimate (2023): 26,194
  - Rank: 99th of 565 in state 10th of 70 in county
  - Density: 4,524.4/sq mi (1,746.9/km^{2})
  - Rank: 131st of 565 in state 32nd of 70 in county
- Time zone: UTC−05:00 (Eastern (EST))
  - Summer (DST): UTC−04:00 (Eastern (EDT))
- ZIP Codes: 07450–07452
- Area code: 201
- FIPS code: 3400363000
- GNIS feature ID: 0885369
- Website: www.ridgewoodnj.net

Ridgewood is a village in Bergen County, in the U.S. state of New Jersey. Ridgewood is a suburban bedroom community of New York City, located approximately 20 miles (32 km) northwest of Midtown Manhattan. As of the 2020 United States census, the village's population was 25,979, an increase of 1,021 (+4.1%) from the 2010 census count of 24,958, which in turn reflected an increase of 22 (+0.1%) from 24,936 in the 2000 census.

It is consistently one of the state's highest-income communities. While in 2000 its per capita income of $51,658 was ranked the 35th-highest in the state, in 2020, the per capita income for the past 12 months in the period 2020-2024 was $93,733, relatively maintaining its ranking at 41st-highest in the state.

== History ==
In 1700, Johannes Van Emburgh built the first home in Ridgewood, having purchased a 250-acre (100 ha) property in 1698.

The Village of Ridgewood was created on November 20, 1894, with the same boundaries as Ridgewood Township, also in Bergen County. The Village became the municipal government while the Township remained a school district. In 1902, the village added portions of Orvil Township, which were returned to Orvil Township in 1915. In 1925, Ridgewood Village acquired area from Franklin Township (remainder now dissolved as Wyckoff). On February 9, 1971, Ridgewood acquired area from Washington Township. On May 28, 1974, it acquired area from Ho-Ho-Kus. The name of the village derives from the characteristics of its terrain.

In 2014, former Ridgewood Public Works Inspector Thomas Rica was convicted of stealing over $460,000 in coins collected from the village's parking meters. Rica was ordered to pay the entire amount back to the village and was permanently barred from seeking public employment in the state of New Jersey.

=== Historic sites ===
Ridgewood is home to the following locations on the National Register of Historic Places:

- Ackerman House – 222 Doremus Avenue (added 1983) was constructed by Johannes and Jemima Ackerman c. 1787 on their 72-acre (29 ha) property and remained in the Ackerman family until the 1920s.
- Ackerman House – 252 Lincoln Avenue (added 1983) is a stone house constructed c. 1810 and named for either David or John Ackerman.
- David Ackerman House – 415 East Saddle River Road (added 1983).
- Ackerman–Van Emburgh House – 789 East Glen Avenue (added 1983) was built c. 1785 by John Ackerman and purchased by the Van Embergh family in 1816.
- Archibald–Vroom House – 160 East Ridgewood Avenue (added 1984).
- Beech Street School – 49 Cottage Place (added 1998).
- Paramus Reformed Church Historic District – Bounded by Franklin Turnpike, Route 17, Saddle River, south side of cemetery and Glen Avenue (added 1975). The Old Paramus Reformed Church was established in 1725, though the current building dates to 1800. During the Revolutionary War, the church was used for several years by the Continental Army, and in 1778 it was the site of the court-martial of General Charles Lee.
- Rathbone–Zabriskie House – 570 North Maple Avenue (added 1983).
- Ridgewood Station – Garber Square (added 1984).
- Van Dien House – 627 Grove Street (added 1983).
- Vanderbeck House – 249 Prospect Street (added 1983).
- Westervelt–Cameron House – 26 East Glen Avenue (added 1983), constructed c. 1767 by John R. Westervelt.

== Geography ==
According to the United States Census Bureau, the village had a total area of 5.80 square miles (15.03 km^{2}), including 5.74 square miles (14.87 km^{2}) of land and 0.06 square miles (0.16 km^{2}) of water (1.07%).

Ridgewood is adjacent to nine municipalities, eight in Bergen County − Fair Lawn, Glen Rock, Ho-Ho-Kus, Midland Park, Wyckoff, Paramus, Waldwick and Washington Township − and Hawthorne in Passaic County.

=== Neighborhoods ===
Ridgewood's neighborhoods include:

- Downtown – The central business district of Ridgewood, "Town" is centered on East Ridgewood Avenue. This area is home to the most iconic buildings in Ridgewood, such as the Wilsey building and the Moore Building.
- Scrabbletown – Located between East Glen Avenue, Franklin Turnpike, and the Ho-Ho-Kus Brook.
- The Old Country Club – Located between Goffle Road, Rock Road, Lincoln Avenue and Godwin Avenue. It is near the border with Midland Park.
- The View – Area on and to the west of Ridgewood's highest point, an unnamed ridge on Crest Road known for its skyline views of New York City.
- Upper Ridgewood – Located north of West Glen Avenue and west of the NJ Transit Main Line tracks.
- Salem Ridge – Located East of Route 17.
- Floral Park – Located between Grove Street, South Pleasant, East Ridgewood Avenue and South Van Dien Street.
- Brookside
- The Lawns – A loosely defined area in southern Ridgewood surrounding Hawes Elementary School.
- The Heights - developed between the 1890s and 1930 between West Ridgewood and West Glen avenues

=== Climate ===
Ridgewood has a hot-summer humid continental climate (Dfa) and the hardiness zone is 7a bordering on 6b.

Climate data for Ridgewood, New Jersey
Month	Jan	Feb	Mar	Apr	May	Jun	Jul	Aug	Sep	Oct	Nov	Dec	Year
Mean daily maximum °F (°C)	38 (3)	41 (5)	50 (10)	62 (17)	72 (22)	81 (27)	86 (30)	84 (29)	76 (24)	64 (18)	54 (12)	43 (6)	63 (17)
Mean daily minimum °F (°C)	19 (−7)	22 (−6)	30 (−1)	40 (4)	50 (10)	60 (16)	65 (18)	63 (17)	55 (13)	42 (6)	34 (1)	25 (−4)	42 (6)
Average precipitation inches (mm)	3.58 (91)	2.86 (73)	4.11 (104)	4.36 (111)	4.20 (107)	4.42 (112)	4.52 (115)	3.88 (99)	4.78 (121)	4.32 (110)	4.09 (104)	4.02 (102)	49.14 (1,249)

== Demographics ==
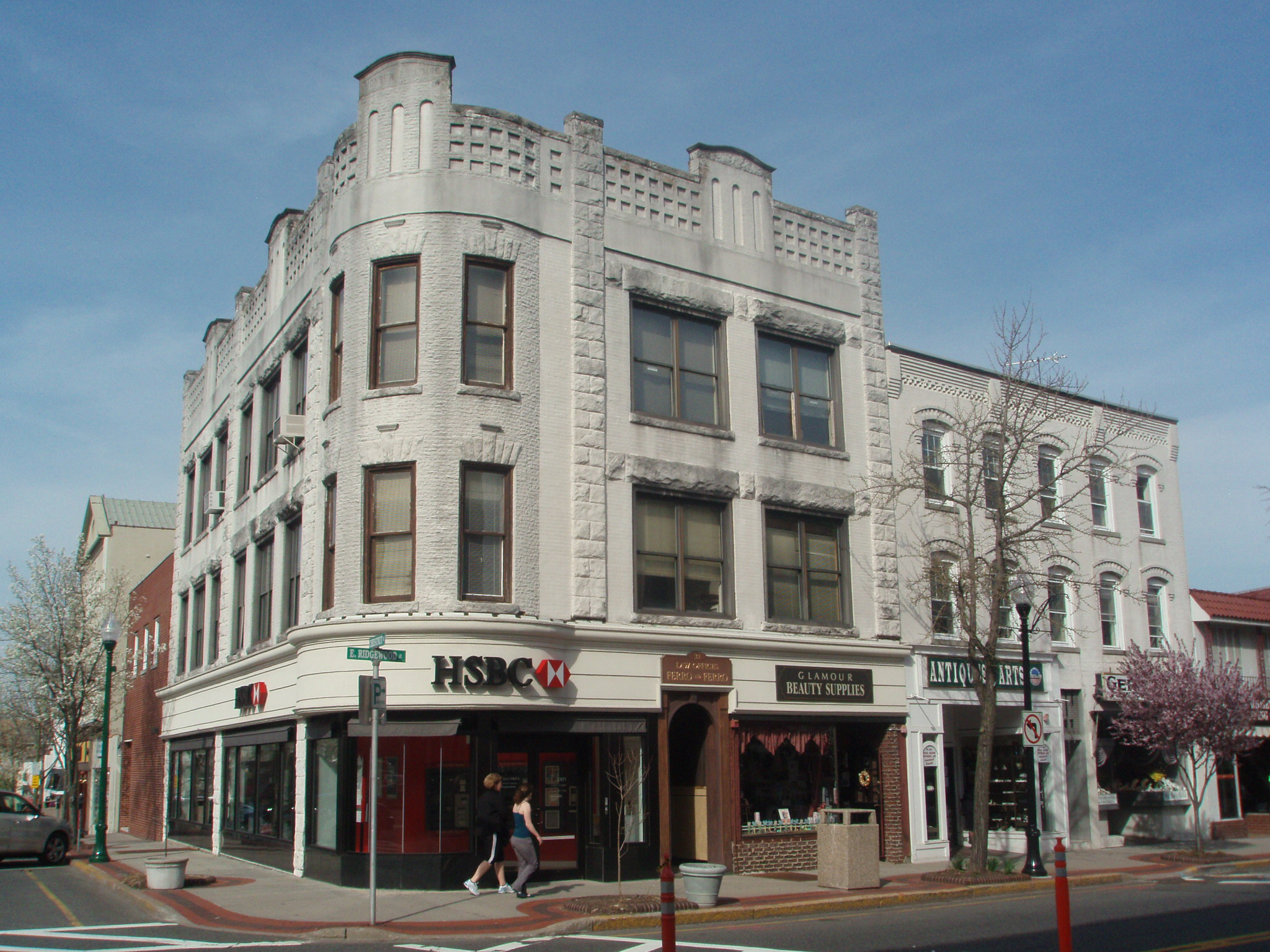
Downtown Ridgewood

Historical population
Census	Pop.	Note	%±
1890	1,047		—
1900	2,685		156.4%
1910	5,416		101.7%
1920	7,580		40.0%
1930	12,188		60.8%
1940	14,948		22.6%
1950	17,481		16.9%
1960	25,391		45.2%
1970	27,547		8.5%
1980	25,208		−8.5%
1990	24,152		−4.2%
2000	24,936		3.2%
2010	24,958		0.1%
2020	25,979		4.1%
2023 (est.)	26,194	▲	0.8%
Population sources: 1890–1920 1890–1910; 1890–1930 1900–2020; 2000 2010 2020

=== Racial and ethnic composition ===
Ridgewood village, New Jersey – Racial and ethnic composition Note: the US Census treats Hispanic/Latino as an ethnic category. This table excludes Latinos from the racial categories and assigns them to a separate category. Hispanics/Latinos may be of any race.
Race / Ethnicity (NH = Non-Hispanic)	Pop 2000	Pop 2010	Pop 2020	% 2000	% 2010	% 2020
White alone (NH)	21,164	19,561	17,786	84.87%	78.38%	68.46%
Black or African American alone (NH)	395	373	353	1.58%	1.49%	1.36%
Native American or Alaska Native alone (NH)	6	10	7	0.02%	0.04%	0.03%
Asian alone (NH)	2,155	3,237	4,556	8.64%	12.97%	17.54%
Native Hawaiian or Pacific Islander alone (NH)	0	3	0	0.00%	0.01%	0.00%
Other race alone (NH)	34	34	111	0.14%	0.14%	0.43%
Mixed race or Multiracial (NH)	240	424	1,097	0.96%	1.70%	4.22%
Hispanic or Latino (any race)	942	1,316	2,069	3.78%	5.27%	7.96%
Total	24,936	24,958	25,979	100.00%	100.00%	100.00%

=== 2020 census ===
As of the 2020 census, Ridgewood had a population of 25,979, an increase of 1,021 from 24,958 in 2010. The median age was 41.0 years. 29.0% of residents were under the age of 18 and 14.5% were 65 years of age or older. For every 100 females, there were 95.7 males, and for every 100 females age 18 and over there were 92.2 males age 18 and over.

100.0% of residents lived in urban areas, while 0.0% lived in rural areas.

There were 8,490 households in Ridgewood, of which 46.8% had children under the age of 18 living in them. Of all households, 70.3% were married-couple households, 9.0% were households with a male householder and no spouse or partner present, and 18.3% were households with a female householder and no spouse or partner present. About 16.1% of all households were made up of individuals, and 8.8% had someone living alone who was 65 years of age or older.

There were 8,814 housing units, of which 3.7% were vacant. The homeowner vacancy rate was 1.1% and the rental vacancy rate was 4.1%.

=== Demographic estimates ===
Based on data from the 2015-2019 American Community Survey, the average number of persons per household was 3.01. 96.8% of households owned a computer. 96.5% of the population (age 25+) graduated high school and 76.0% had a bachelor's degree.

=== 2010 census ===
The 2010 United States census counted 24,958 people, 8,456 households, and 6,756 families in the village. The population density was 4,339.0 per square mile (1,675.3/km^{2}). There were 8,743 housing units at an average density of 1,520.0 per square mile (586.9/km^{2}). The racial makeup was 82.21% (20,518) White, 1.59% (398) Black or African American, 0.06% (16) Native American, 12.99% (3,242) Asian, 0.02% (4) Pacific Islander, 1.06% (265) from other races, and 2.06% (515) from two or more races. Hispanic or Latino of any race were 5.27% (1,316) of the population.

Of the 8,456 households, 45.4% had children under the age of 18; 69.1% were married couples living together; 8.3% had a female householder with no husband present and 20.1% were non-families. Of all households, 17.4% were made up of individuals and 8.8% had someone living alone who was 65 years of age or older. The average household size was 2.93 and the average family size was 3.34.

30.7% of the population were under the age of 18, 5.2% from 18 to 24, 21.1% from 25 to 44, 30.6% from 45 to 64, and 12.5% who were 65 years of age or older. The median age was 41.0 years. For every 100 females, the population had 93.3 males. For every 100 females ages 18 and older there were 90.1 males.

The Census Bureau's 2006–2010 American Community Survey showed that (in 2010 inflation-adjusted dollars) median household income was $143,229 (with a margin of error of +/− $10,530) and the median family income was $172,825 (+/− $9,197). Males had a median income of $111,510 (+/− $12,513) versus $77,651 (+/− $9,008) for females. The per capita income for the village was $67,560 (+/− $3,740). About 2.2% of families and 3.3% of the population were below the poverty line, including 2.4% of those under age 18 and 4.3% of those age 65 or over.

Same-sex couples headed 38 households in 2010, an increase from the 22 counted in 2000.

=== 2000 census ===
As of the 2000 United States census there were 24,936 people, 8,603 households, and 6,779 families residing in the village. The population density was 4,308.9 inhabitants per square mile (1,663.7/km^{2}). There were 8,802 housing units at an average density of 1,521.0 per square mile (587.3/km^{2}). The racial makeup of the village was 87.82% White, 1.64% African American, 0.04% Native American, 8.67% Asian, 0.59% from other races, and 1.23% from two or more races. Hispanic or Latino of any race were 3.78% of the population.

There were 8,603 households, out of which 44.3% had children under the age of 18 living with them, 69.4% were married couples living together, 7.2% had a female householder with no husband present, and 21.2% were non-families. 18.5% of all households were made up of individuals, and 8.8% had someone living alone who was 65 years of age or older. The average household size was 2.87 and the average family size was 3.30.

In the village, the population was spread out, with 30.0% under the age of 18, 4.4% from 18 to 24, 27.5% from 25 to 44, 25.9% from 45 to 64, and 12.2% who were 65 years of age or older. The median age was 39 years. For every 100 females, there were 92.8 males. For every 100 females age 18 and over, there were 88.5 males.

The median income for a household in the village was $104,286, and the median income for a family was $121,848. Males had a median income of $90,422 versus $50,248 for females. The per capita income for the village was $51,658. 3.0% of the population and 1.8% of families were below the poverty line, including 2.5% of those under age 18 and 4.3% of those age 65 or over.

== Arts and culture ==
The indie rock band Real Estate was described by The Record as "Ridgewood's best-known musical export". Rock band Senses Fail was founded in Ridgewood in 2002.

== Parks and recreation ==
Park facilities in Ridgewood include:

- Graydon Park, located between Linwood and North Maple Avenues, includes a beach park pool, baseball field, soccer field, and roller rink.
- Veterans Field, colloquially referred to as Vets, located next to the library and police station, includes four baseball and softball fields, as well as a bandshell offering free concerts. The Ridgewood High School baseball and softball teams plays its home games here.
- Citizens Park, located across the street from George Washington Middle School, includes two baseball fields and a soccer field. The hill is often used in the winter for sledding.
- Ridgewood Wild Duck Pond, part of Bergen's Saddle River County Park, is located on East Ridgewood Avenue between Paramus Road and Pershing Avenue. Amenities include circular path with bench seating around duck pond, picnic pavilion, additional picnic areas, children's playground, fenced-in dog park, restroom facilities and entrance to a 6-mile (9.7 km), multi-use bike and pedestrian pathway. This pathway connects Ridgewood Duck Pond with five other areas along the Saddle River County Park: Glen Rock, Fair Lawn, Paramus, Rochelle Park and Saddle Brook. Fishing (NJ state license required) and ice skating are allowed at pond when conditions permit. The water is treated with certain chemicals, however, and swimming is strictly prohibited. Geese can be found at the Ridgewood Wild Duck Pond.

== Government ==
=== Local government ===
Ridgewood is governed within the Faulkner Act (formally known as the Optional Municipal Charter Law) under Council-Manager plan B, as implemented on July 1, 1970, by direct petition. The village is one of 42 municipalities (of the 564) statewide governed under this form. The governing body is composed of five council members who are responsible to hire and oversee a professional village manager who has full executive power for all departments. The government consists of five council members, with all positions elected at-large in nonpartisan elections to serve four-year terms on a staggered basis, with either two or three seats coming up for election in even-numbered years on the second Tuesday in November. At a reorganization meeting held in January after newly elected council members take office, the council chooses a mayor and deputy mayor from among its members for two-year terms, with the mayor presiding over council meetings, but without any executive authority. The village council appoints a village manager to oversee the day-to-day operations of the village, to handle personnel, citizen inquiries and complaints, and to handle the administrative duties of the village. The village council passes local laws, makes appointments to various boards and committees, and awards various contracts for purchases of goods and services used by the village. They also review, amend, and adopt the annual budget for the Village prepared by the Village Manager and Chief Financial Officer.

As of 2026, members of the Ridgewood Village Council are Mayor Paul Vagianos (term on council ends December 31, 2028; term as mayor ends 2026), Deputy Mayor Pamela Perron (2028), Frank Mortimer (2028), Evan Weitz (2026) and Siobhan Winograd (2026).

In August 2021, councilmember Bernadette Walsh resigned from the seat expiring in December 2024, which was left temporarily vacant. In the November 2021 general election, Paul Vagianos was elected to serve the balance of the term of office.

In the November 2020 general election, voters approved by a 59%-41% margin a referendum that would move school and municipal elections (which had been held in April and May respectively) so that they were included as part of the November general election. The supporters of the initiative argued that the shift would "save money, improve turnout and improve security at schools where elections are held". The village council challenged the results of the referendum, but the village lost in Superior Court and had the ruling affirmed on appeal in March 2021, with the judge ruling that the village clerk had acted "improperly and unlawfully" in seeking to block the referendum.

Ridgewood is one of only four municipalities in New Jersey with the village type of government, joining Loch Arbour, Ridgefield Park and South Orange.

=== Federal, state and county representation ===
Ridgewood is located in the 5th Congressional District and is part of New Jersey's 40th state legislative district.

For the 119th United States Congress, New Jersey's 5th congressional district is represented by Josh Gottheimer (D, Wyckoff). New Jersey is represented in the United States Senate by Democrats Cory Booker (Newark, term ends 2027) and Andy Kim (Moorestown, term ends 2031).

For the 2026–2027 session, the 40th legislative district of the New Jersey Legislature is represented in the State Senate by Kristin Corrado (R, Totowa) and in the General Assembly by Al Barlas (R, Cedar Grove) and Christopher DePhillips (R, Wyckoff).

Bergen County is governed by a directly elected County Executive, with legislative functions performed by a Board of County Commissioners comprised of seven members who are elected at-large to three-year terms in partisan elections on a staggered basis, with either two or three seats coming up for election each November; a Chairman and Vice Chairman are selected from among its seven members at a reorganization meeting held every January. As of 2025, the county executive is James J. Tedesco III (D, Paramus), whose four-year term of office ends December 31, 2026.

Bergen County's Commissioners are Chair Mary J. Amoroso (D, Mahwah, 2025), Vice Chair Steven A. Tanelli (D, North Arlington, 2027), Chair Pro Tem Joan Voss (D, Fort Lee, 2026), Rafael Marte (D, Bergenfield, 2026), Germaine M. Ortiz (D, Emerson, 2025), Thomas J. Sullivan Jr. (D, Montvale, 2025) and Tracy Silna Zur (D, Franklin Lakes, 2027).

Bergen County's elected constitutional officials are Clerk John S. Hogan (D, Northvale, 2026), Sheriff Anthony Cureton (D, Englewood, 2027) and Surrogate Michael R. Dressler (D, Cresskill, 2026).

=== Politics ===
United States presidential election results for Ridgewood 2024 2020 2016 2012 2008 2004
Year	Republican		Democratic		Third party(ies)	
Year	No.	%	No.	%	No.	%
2024	5,040	35.16%	8,983	62.66%	313	2.18%
2020	4,938	32.33%	10,126	66.30%	210	1.37%
2016	4,576	34.96%	8,000	61.12%	514	3.93%
2012	5,852	48.11%	6,181	50.82%	130	1.07%
2008	5,743	43.47%	7,387	55.92%	80	0.61%
2004	6,357	48.50%	6,656	50.78%	94	0.72%

As of March 2011, there were a total of 15,983 registered voters in Ridgewood, of which 4,727 (29.6% vs. 31.7% countywide) were registered as Democrats, 4,125 (25.8% vs. 21.1%) were registered as Republicans and 7,118 (44.5% vs. 47.1%) were registered as Unaffiliated. There were 13 voters registered as Libertarians or Greens. Among the village's 2010 Census population, 64.0% (vs. 57.1% in Bergen County) were registered to vote, including 92.4% of those ages 18 and over (vs. 73.7% countywide).

In the 2016 presidential election, Democrat Hillary Clinton received 8,000 votes (60.4% vs. 54.2% countywide), ahead of Republican Donald Trump with 4,576 votes (34.6% vs. 41.1%) and other candidates with 665 votes (5.0% vs. 4.6%), among the 13,308 ballots cast by the village's 17,892 registered voters, for a turnout of 74.4% (vs. 72.5% in Bergen County). In the 2012 presidential election, Democrat Barack Obama received 6,181 votes here (50.5% vs. 54.8% countywide), ahead of Republican Mitt Romney with 5,852 votes (47.8% vs. 43.5%) and other candidates with 130 votes (1.1% vs. 0.9%), among the 12,232 ballots cast by the village's 17,124 registered voters, for a turnout of 71.4% (vs. 70.4% in Bergen County). In the 2008 presidential election, Democrat Barack Obama received 7,387 votes here (55.5% vs. 53.9% countywide), ahead of Republican John McCain with 5,743 votes (43.2% vs. 44.5%) and other candidates with 80 votes (0.6% vs. 0.8%), among the 13,306 ballots cast by the village's 16,867 registered voters, for a turnout of 78.9% (vs. 76.8% in Bergen County). In the 2004 presidential election, Democrat John Kerry received 6,656 votes here (50.7% vs. 51.7% countywide), ahead of Republican George W. Bush with 6,357 votes (48.4% vs. 47.2%) and other candidates with 94 votes (0.7% vs. 0.7%), among the 13,141 ballots cast by the village's 16,325 registered voters, for a turnout of 80.5% (vs. 76.9% in the whole county).

Gubernatorial election results for Ridgewood
Year	Republican		Democratic		Third party(ies)	
Year	No.	%	No.	%	No.	%
2025	4,198	37.40%	7,004	62.39%	24	0.21%
2021	3,655	39.82%	5,481	59.71%	43	0.47%
2017	2,562	38.46%	3,999	60.04%	100	1.50%
2013	4,259	62.90%	2,453	36.23%	59	0.87%
2009	4,192	49.06%	3,885	45.47%	467	5.47%
2005	3,852	47.46%	4,122	50.78%	143	1.76%

In the 2013 gubernatorial election, Republican Chris Christie received 62.9% of the vote (4,259 cast), ahead of Democrat Barbara Buono with 36.2% (2,453 votes), and other candidates with 0.9% (59 votes), among the 6,864 ballots cast by the village's 16,103 registered voters (93 ballots were spoiled), for a turnout of 42.6%. In the 2009 gubernatorial election, Republican Chris Christie received 4,192 votes here (48.8% vs. 45.8% countywide), ahead of Democrat Jon Corzine with 3,885 votes (45.3% vs. 48.0%), Independent Chris Daggett with 423 votes (4.9% vs. 4.7%) and other candidates with 44 votes (0.5% vs. 0.5%), among the 8,582 ballots cast by the village's 16,509 registered voters, yielding a 52.0% turnout (vs. 50.0% in the county).

United States Senate election results for Ridgewood1
Year	Republican		Democratic		Third party(ies)	
Year	No.	%	No.	%	No.	%
2024	5,068	37.15%	8,340	61.13%	235	1.72%
2018	4,036	42.49%	5,238	55.14%	225	2.37%
2012	5,337	47.12%	5,806	51.26%	183	1.62%
2006	4,204	47.37%	4,558	51.36%	112	1.26%

United States Senate election results for Ridgewood2
Year	Republican		Democratic		Third party(ies)	
Year	No.	%	No.	%	No.	%
2020	5,301	35.23%	9,580	63.68%	164	1.09%
2014	3,030	42.80%	3,951	55.81%	99	1.40%
2013	2,116	41.03%	3,012	58.41%	29	0.56%
2008	5,730	47.10%	6,316	51.92%	120	0.99%

== Education ==
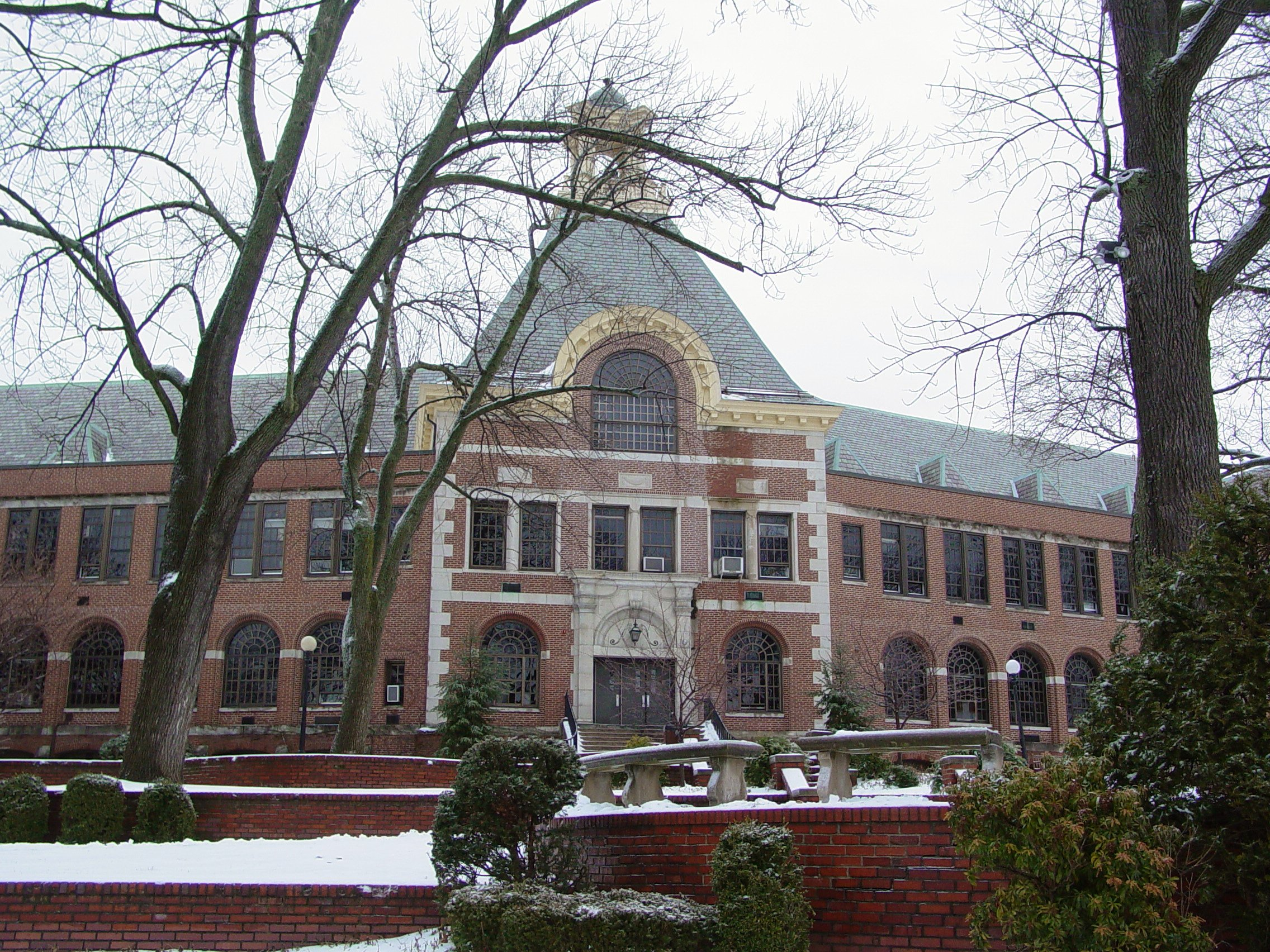
Ridgewood High School

The Ridgewood Public Schools serves students in pre-kindergarten through twelfth grade. As of the 2020–21 school year, the district, comprised of 10 schools, had an enrollment of 5,613 students and 432.6 classroom teachers (on an FTE basis), for a student–teacher ratio of 13.0:1. Schools in the district (with 2020–21 enrollment data from the National Center for Education Statistics) are Glen School with 60 students in PreK and Private Day Care Center, Henrietta Hawes Elementary School with 593 students in grades K-5, Orchard Elementary School with 299 students in grades K-5, Ridge Elementary School with 443 students in grades K-5, Irwin B. Somerville Elementary School with 383 students in grades K-5, Ira W. Travell Elementary School with 377 students in grades K-5, Willard Elementary School with 461 students in grades K-5, Benjamin Franklin Middle School with 698 students in grades 6-8, George Washington Middle School with 666 students in grades 6-8 and Ridgewood High School with 1,775 students in grades 9-12.

The district's high school was the 28th-ranked public high school in New Jersey out of 339 schools statewide in New Jersey Monthly magazine's September 2014 cover story on the state's "Top Public High Schools", using a new ranking methodology. The school had been ranked 28th in the state of 328 schools in 2012, after being ranked 20th in 2010 out of 322 schools listed. The school was ranked 606th in U.S. News & World Report national rankings for 2019.

According to the New Jersey Department of Education, Ridgewood is a socioeconomic District Factor Group of J, the highest of eight categories.

Public school students from the village, and all of Bergen County, are eligible to attend the secondary education programs offered by the Bergen County Technical Schools, which include the Bergen County Academies in Hackensack, and the Bergen Tech campus in Teterboro or Paramus. The district offers programs on a shared-time or full-time basis, with admission based on an extremely selective and competitive application process and tuition covered by the student's home school district.

The Holmstead School serves students of high school age with high intellectual potential who have not succeeded in traditional school settings. Students are placed in the school by referral from their home public school districts, with tuition paid for by the school district.

Preschools in Ridgewood include Bethlehem Early Learning Center, West Side Presbyterian, First Presbyterian School, the Cooperative Nursery School of Ridgewood, and the Montessori Learning Center

== Local media ==
The village of Ridgewood is served by two weekly community newspapers, The Ridgewood News and the Ridgewood Suburban News, both of which are published by North Jersey Media Group. The daily newspaper for the region is The Record which is also published by North Jersey Media Group. The company's website, NorthJersey.com, has a Ridgewood town page that includes local coverage from all three of these papers. Patch Media provides Ridgewood with its own daily news website, which offers news, events, announcements and Local Voices.

== Transportation ==
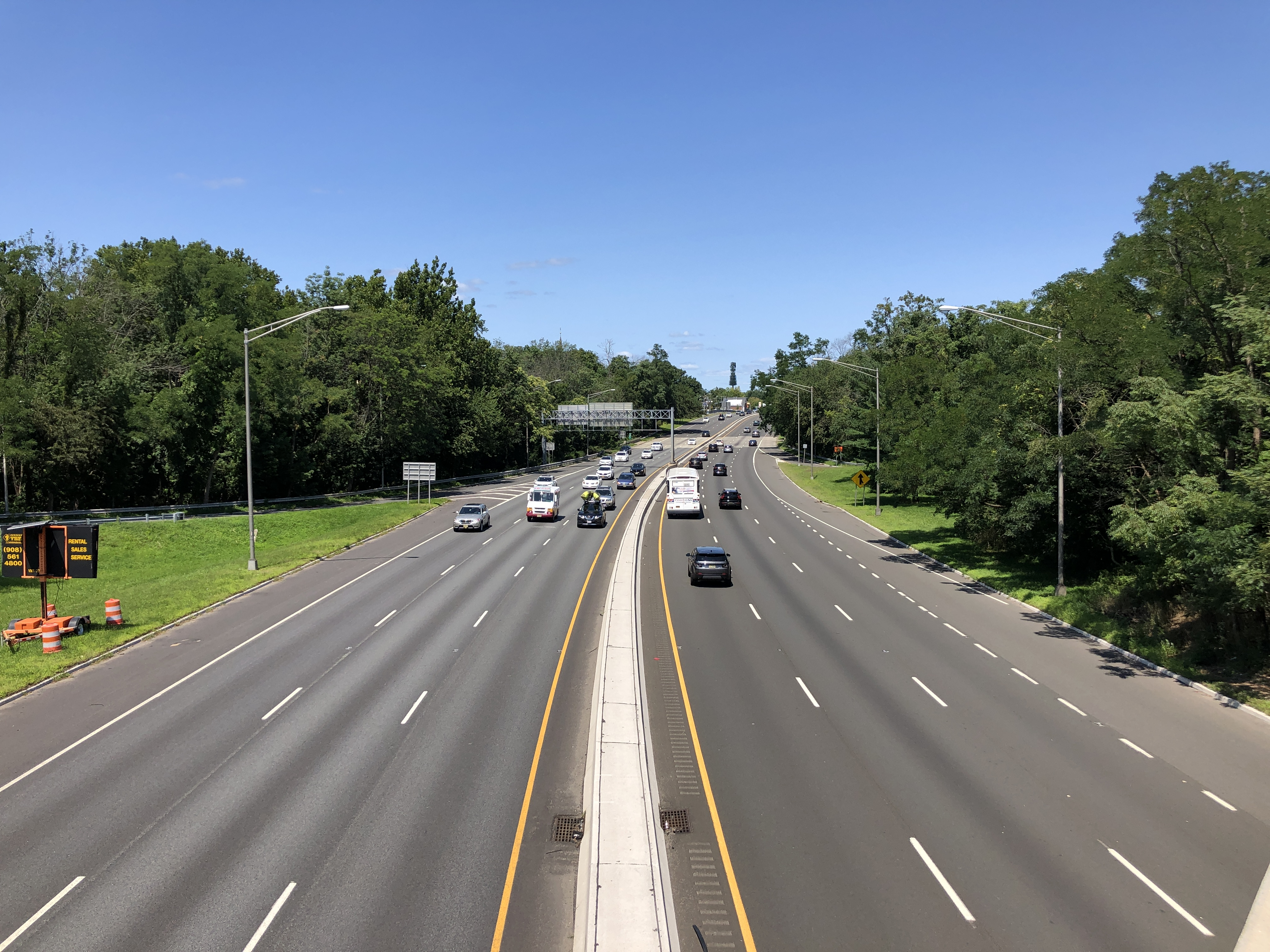
Route 17 northbound in Ridgewood

=== Roads and highways ===
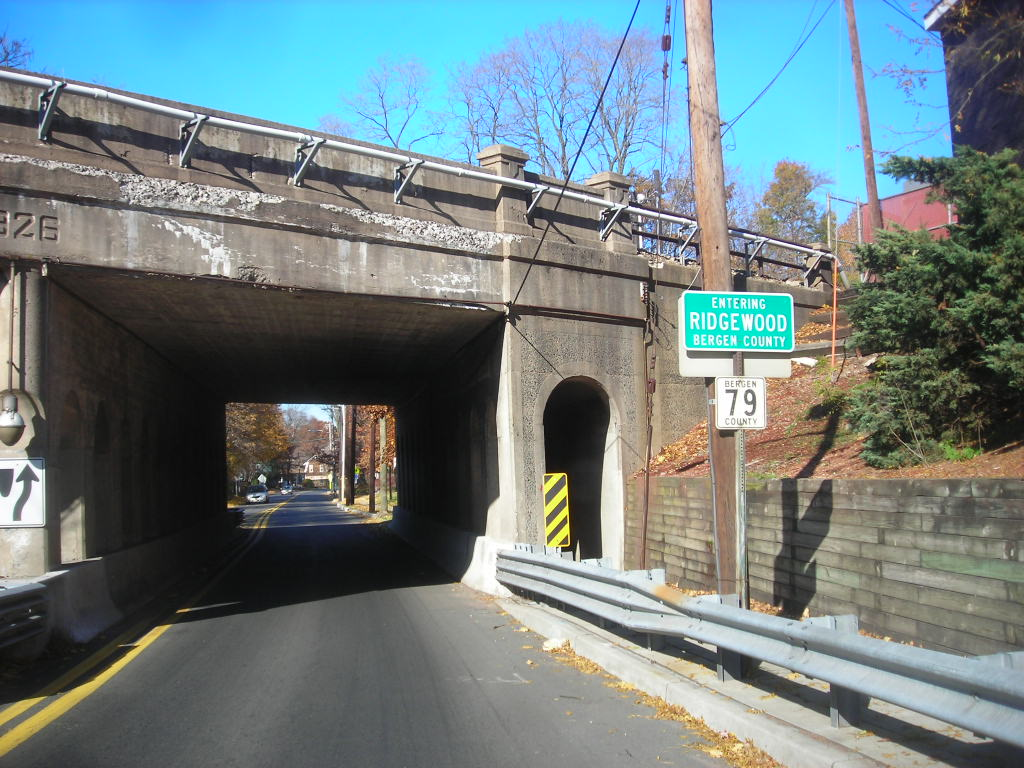
Entering Ridgewood along County Route 79

As of May 2010, the village had a total of 94.70 miles (152.40 km) of roadways, of which 79.79 miles (128.41 km) were maintained by the municipality, 13.77 miles (22.16 km) by Bergen County, and 1.14 miles (1.83 km) by the New Jersey Department of Transportation. Major roads that pass through Ridgewood include New Jersey Route 17, Franklin Turnpike, County Route 84 (commonly known as East and West Ridgewood Avenue) and County Route 507 (Maple Avenue).

=== Public transportation ===
The Ridgewood train station is served by the NJ Transit Main Line as well as the Bergen County Line. The station features three platforms. The first is for all trains headed south toward Hoboken Terminal. The second is for Bergen County Line trains headed in the same direction, and the third is for Main Line trains headed toward Suffern and Port Jervis. NJ Transit trains on both the Bergen County and the Main Lines go to Hoboken, stopping at Secaucus Junction, for transfers to trains to New York Penn Station in Midtown Manhattan and other destinations served by the station. Parking is limited near the Ridgewood train station. Taxicabs are available at the train station; the taxi building is on the northbound platform.

NJ Transit buses in Ridgewood include the 148, 163 and 164 to the Port Authority Bus Terminal in Midtown Manhattan, the 175 to the George Washington Bridge Bus Station, and local service offered on the 722 (to Paramus Park and Paterson), 746 (to Paterson, as Ridgewood is its terminus) and 752 (to Hackensack) routes. Except for the 148 route, all the others stop at NJ Transit's Ridgewood Bus Terminal on Van Neste Square.

Short Line offers service along Route 17 to the Port Authority Bus Terminal, as well as to the George Washington Bridge Bus Station and down the East Side on Manhattan to 23rd Street.

== Notable people ==
See List of people from Ridgewood, New Jersey.

== Points of interest ==
Warner Theater was a Bow Tie Cinema located on East Ridgewood Avenue. Opened in 1932, the theater closed in January 2024.

== Sources ==
- Municipal Incorporations of the State of New Jersey (according to Counties) prepared by the Division of Local Government, Department of the Treasury (New Jersey); December 1, 1958.
- Clayton, W. Woodford; and Nelson, William. History of Bergen and Passaic Counties, New Jersey, with Biographical Sketches of Many of its Pioneers and Prominent Men, Philadelphia: Everts and Peck, 1882.
- Harvey, Cornelius Burnham (ed.), Genealogical History of Hudson and Bergen Counties, New Jersey. New York: New Jersey Genealogical Publishing Co., 1900.
- Parrillo, Vincent; Parrillo, Beth; and Wrubel, Arthur. Ridgewood, Arcadia Publishing, 1999. ISBN 9780738501895.
- Van Valen, James M. History of Bergen County, New Jersey. New York: New Jersey Publishing and Engraving Co., 1900.
- Westervelt, Frances A. (Frances Augusta), 1858–1942, History of Bergen County, New Jersey, 1630–1923, Lewis Historical Publishing Company, 1923.
