= Hopper House (Saddle River, New Jersey) =

Historic house in New Jersey, United States

- U.S. National Register of Historic Places
- New Jersey Register of Historic Places
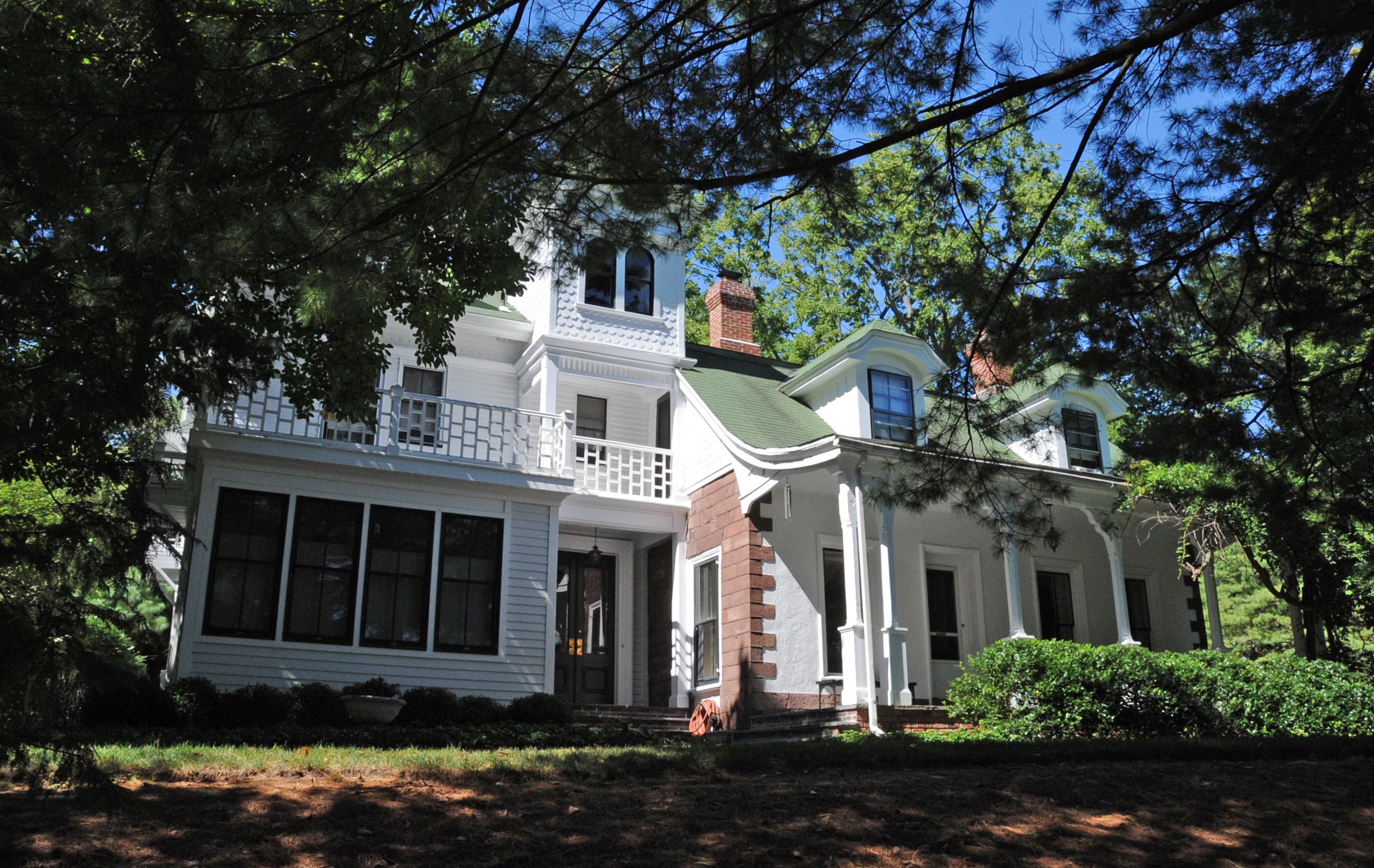

- Location within Bergen County, New Jersey Location within New Jersey Location within the United States
- Location: 45 West Saddle River Road, Saddle River, New Jersey
- Coordinates: 41°0′28″N 74°6′22″W
- Area: 2.6 acres (1.1 ha)
- MPS: Stone Houses of Bergen County TR; Saddle River MRA
- NRHP reference No.: 84002569
- NJRHP No.: 684

Significant dates
- Added to NRHP: July 24, 1984
- Designated NJRHP: October 3, 1980

The Hopper House is located at 45 West Saddle River Road in the borough of Saddle River in Bergen County, New Jersey, United States. The historic stone house was added to the National Register of Historic Places on July 24, 1984, for its significance in architecture and exploration/settlement. It was listed as part of the Early Stone Houses of Bergen County Multiple Property Submission (MPS) and the Saddle River MPS.

== History and description ==
According to the nomination form, the oldest section of the house may have been built in 1740, probably by a member of the Hopper family. The one and one-half story wing was constructed using sandstone and features a gambrel roof. D. Hopper is listed as living here in 1861. Orville James Victor and Metta Victoria Fuller Victor, both authors, lived here next. They remodeled the house in High Victorian style around 1870, named the house "The Terraces" and lived here until 1905.

== See also ==
- National Register of Historic Places listings in Bergen County, New Jersey
