= George H. Himes =

American Oregon pioneer

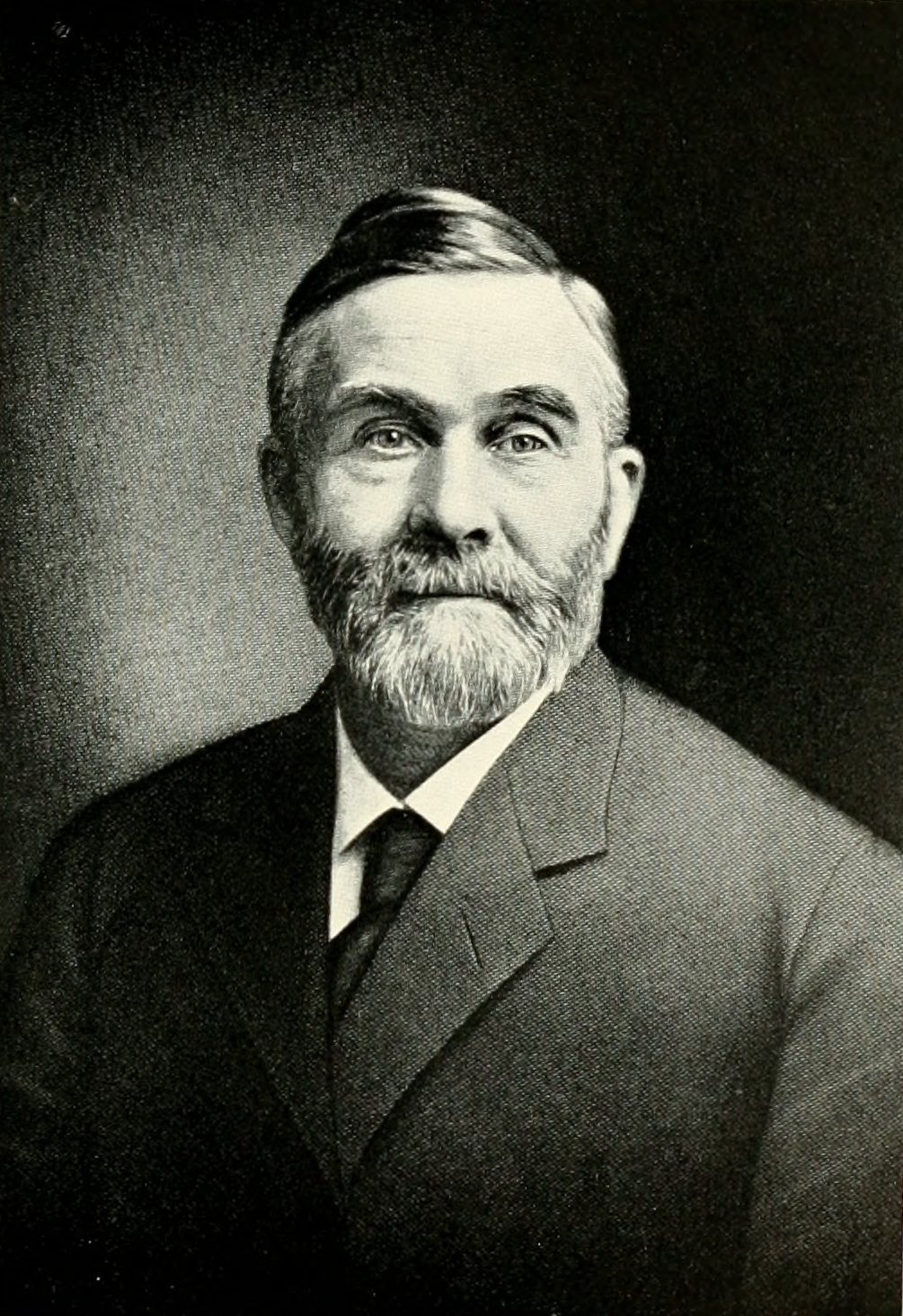
- Born: May 18, 1844; Leroy Township, Pennsylvania
- Died: January 6, 1940 (aged 95); Portland, Oregon
- Resting place: Greenwood Hills Cemetery; 45.460773°N 122.679395°W
- Occupations: Printer; Historian
- Years active: 1861 – 1940
- Organization: Oregon Historical Society
- Spouse: Anna Riggs
- Children: Carrie, Edna (Reid), Sarah, Homer, Mary, Grace (Rice), Clarida, Eunice, Mildred, Fay, Lurah
- Parent(s): Tyrus Himes, Emeline Holcombe

George Henry Himes (May 18, 1844 – January 6, 1940) was an Oregon pioneer and the first curator of the Oregon Historical Society. His collection of diaries and notebooks preserved the details of the lives and experiences of many pioneers.

He is the namesake of George Himes Park in Portland, Oregon, United States, and was the namesake of a World War II era Liberty Ship.

== Early life ==
Himes was born in 1844 near Troy, Pennsylvania, in the community of Leroy Township. His parents were Tyrus Himes and Emeline Holcombe, and soon after George's birth they attended a lecture by Samuel Parker recounting his experiences in the Oregon Country.

In April 1847, the family joined a wagon train heading from Pennsylvania to the Oregon Country. Emeline Himes became sick along the route, and they stopped in La Fayette, Illinois to seek medical help. While waiting for his wife to recover, Tyrus Himes opened a shoe making business. Later he filed a claim on an abandoned land grant in La Fayette and began farming. In March 1853, the family continued west in a 32-wagon caravan under the direction of James Biles. Biles chose the difficult Naches Pass, and the train arrived in the lower Puget Sound, where Tyrus filed a Donation Land Claim for 640 acres near Olympia.

George worked on the farm and attended school during the winter months. His formal education lasted from 1854 to 1859. He began keeping a diary in 1858, and his lifetime of diaries and notebooks would later become a central part of the George H. Himes papers at the Oregon Historical Society.

He married Anna Riggs in 1866, and the couple had 11 children, although many of the children died before maturity.

== Career ==
=== Printing ===
Himes began his printing career in 1861 with a three-year apprenticeship at The Washington Standard in Olympia. In 1864 he moved to Portland and worked as a typesetter at The Oregonian. Later in June, Himes formed a job printing partnership with William D. Carter, Carter and Himes. The partnership continued until 1870 when Himes became sole proprietor and changed the name to "Himes the Printer."

=== Publishing ===
Beginning in 1871, Himes published a semi-monthly newspaper, The Commercial Reporter, for ten years, with a circulation of 500 readers. At roughly the same time he published The Oregon Churchman with a circulation of 800. From 1876 to 1879, he printed the Daily Bee, a newspaper owned by the same firm responsible for the West Shore.

Himes published a succession of books, including William L. Adams' History of Medicine and Surgery, Banks, Censor Echoes, Rob Roy Parrish, Echoes from the Valley, Eels, Hymns in the Chinook Jargon Language, and the first two volumes of poetry by Joaquin Miller. His publication of Flora of Northwest America by Thomas Howell was the first catalog of regional plants in the Pacific Northwest. Himes invested his own resources in the work of his authors, and he did not do well financially. When he published Lang's History of the Willamette Valley in 1885, the book was such a commercial failure that Himes became bankrupt.

=== Oregon Historical Society ===
In 1886 Himes was elected secretary of the Oregon Pioneer Association, a position he would keep for decades. He was also active in the Oregon Humane Society, the Oregon YMCA, and the Indian War Veterans of the North Pacific Coast. He began to promote the idea of a society to preserve Oregon history, and in 1898 the Oregon Historical Society (OHS) was formed with Himes as assistant secretary. Later Himes became curator of collections at the society, a post he would keep for nearly the rest of his life. At OHS, Himes traveled and interviewed pioneers, taking notes that would become part of the OHS collection. Often people would send him clippings and journals pertaining to Oregon history. He retired as OHS curator in February 1939.

== Death ==
Himes died on January 6, 1940, at the age of 95, at Coffey Memorial Hospital in Portland, two to three weeks after suffering a stroke. He is buried at Greenwood Hills Cemetery in Portland, Oregon.

== Namesakes ==
- George H. Himes Liberty Ship
- George H. Himes Park

== See also ==
- History of Washington
- History of Oregon
- History of Portland, Oregon
