= Erastus Flavel Beadle =

American printer and publisher

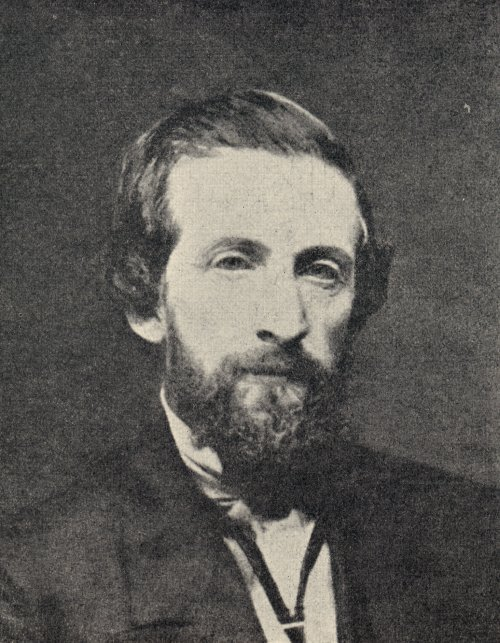
Erastus Flavel Beadle (1821–1894)

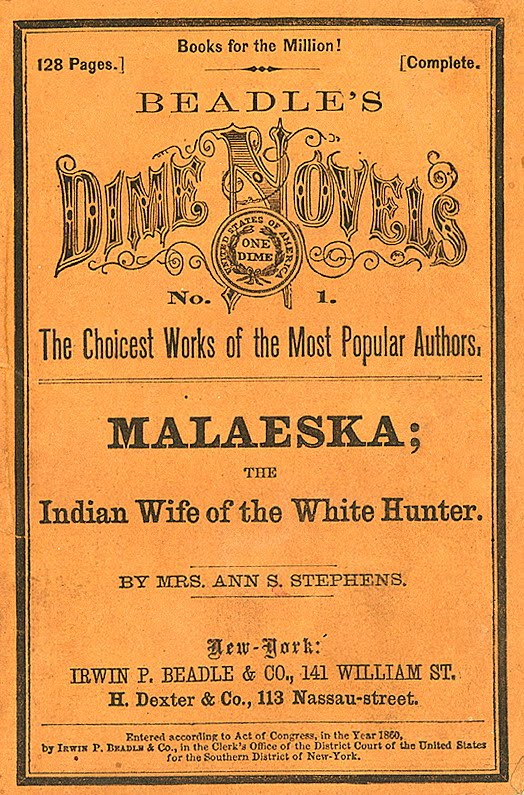
Front cover of Malaeska, 1860

Erastus Flavel Beadle (September 9, 1821 – December 18, 1894) was an American printer and pioneer in publishing pulp fiction.

== Biography ==
Erastus was born in Otsego County, New York, United States, in 1821, and had a brother, Irwin Pedro Beadle (1826–1882), who assisted him in various business undertakings. They were the grandsons of Benjamin Beadle, a Revolutionary War soldier. After a hiatus in Michigan, the Beadle family moved to New York, and lived in Chautauqua County, New York. Erastus worked for a miller named Hayes, where he began his printing career when cutting wooden letters to label bags of grain. In 1838, he was apprenticed to H. & E. Phinney, a publishing firm in Cooperstown, New York. There he learned typesetting, stereotyping, binding, and engraving. He married Mary Ann Pennington (d.1889) in 1846, and in 1847 the couple moved to Buffalo, New York, where Erastus worked as a stereotyper. In 1849 Irwin went to Buffalo too, and found a job as a bookbinder.

The next year, in 1850, the Beadle brothers set up their own stereotype foundry. Their first publishing venture was the magazine "Youth's Casket", started in 1852. Irwin left the company in 1856 and went to the Nebraska Territory where he acted as a secretary for a company settling the town of Saratoga. The town was busted in the Panic of 1857, and Beadle returned to New York shortly thereafter.

== Books for the millions ==
In 1860, after finally settling down in Brooklyn, Irwin came with an idea to publish, first, ten-cent booklets, and then, a series of paper-covered novels at the same price, which brought him recognition and commercial success. On June 7, 1860, the New-York Tribune advertised the first book in the dime novel series, Indian Wife of the White Hunter written by Ann S. Stephens by printing the following, "Books for the Millions! A dollar book for the dime. 128 pages complete, only Ten Cents!!! Beadle's dime novels No. 1 Maleska."

Many established as well as aspiring writers took part in the project geared towards the masses, including William Jared Hall, Frances Fuller Victor, John Neal, Mayne Reid, A. J. H. Duganne, Edward S. Ellis, William Reynolds Eyster, William W. Busteed, James L. Bowen, Mary A. Denison, Charles Dunning Clark, among others. Orville James Victor served for nearly thirty years as the series' editor. His wife Metta Victor was the editor from 1859 to 1861 for Erastus Beadle's monthly magazine The Home. For many years, using several pen names, she wrote novels published by Beadle & Adams.

== Later life ==
Erastus became a millionaire and retired to his estate in Cooperstown, New York, in 1889, where he died on December 18, 1894.

== Recognition ==
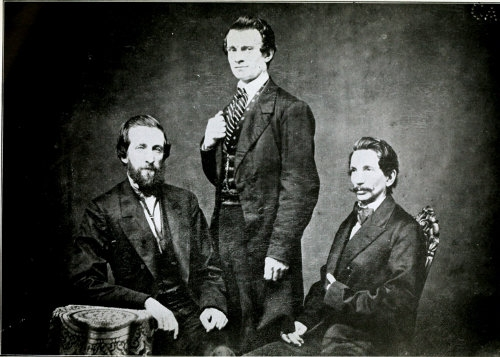
Dime novel publishing team, Erastus Beadle, David Adams, and (possibly) Irwin Beadle

At first, dime novels were denounced as "pernicious and evil" by literary purists. At the beginning of the twentieth century, in July 1907, Charles M. Harvey, a critic, changed the prevailing attitudes after publishing in the Atlantic Monthly a reflective piece titled, The Dime Novel in American Life. He stated there,

These tales incited a love of reading among the youth of the country.... Many of the boys and girls who encountered Pontiac, Boone, the renegade Girty, Mad Anthony, Kenton, and Black Hawk in their pages were incited to find out something more about those characters and their times, and thus were introduced to much of the nation’s story and geography. Manliness and womanliness among the readers were cultivated by these little books, not by homilies, but by example. It can be truthfully said that the taste and tone of the life of the generation which grew up with these tales were improved by them. No age limit was set up among Beadle’s readers. Lincoln was one of them.

In the middle of the same century, Erastus F. Beadle was posthumously recognized as a Dime Novel King. His papers are archived at the University of Delaware.

== The Home ==
Beadle's second venture in the publishing line was a monthly magazine for women: The Home, a Fireside Monthly Companion and Guide for the Wife, the Mother, the Sister and the Daughter ... It was an octavo, 9 ½ by 6 inches in size. Each number contained about 54 pages enclosed in wrappers of a grayish tan color. The magazine was illustrated by full-page and smaller woodcuts and later by tinted lithographs and steel engravings. ... Nine semiannual volumes were issued, from January, 1856, to June, 1860. ...
... The last volume, however, from January to June, 1860, was entitled Beadle's Home Monthly.

== Beadle & Adams ==
In 1856 Robert Adams joined the Beadle brothers' company in Buffalo. In 1858 the company relocated to New York City. In 1866 Robert Adams died. His younger brothers William and David Adams in 1866 went into business with Irwin Beadle, who in 1868 made his final retirement from publishing. The firm's publishing offices were on William Street in Manhattan. In 1872 the name "Beadle & Adams" was used for the company run by Erastus Beadle with William and David Adams. After Erastus Beadle died in 1894, Williams Adams became the sole owner of Beadle & Adams. William Adams died in 1896. In 1897 the company Beadle & Adams ceased to exist, the executors of Williams Adams's estate sold the assets of Beadle & Adams to M. J. Ivers & Co., and the Ivers name replaced the Beadle name on the Dime Library and the other publications formerly belonging to Beadle & Adams.

Most important of the Beadle series, from the historical standpoint, is ... entitled "Lives of Great Americans." It appeared monthly, in the 70's, for about a year, and contained thirteen different titles.

In the 1870s, the series "Lives of Great Americans" presented biographies of Ethan Allen, Daniel Boone, Kit Carson, Davy Crockett, Ulysses S. Grant, John Paul Jones, Gilbert du Motier, Marquis de Lafayette, Abraham Lincoln, Israel Putnam, Pontiac, Tecumseh, George Washington, and Anthony Wayne.

Although other publishers had attempted to sell cheap books before, Beadle and Adams revolutionized the field of cheap fiction by drastically lowering the price to a mere ten centers when other books were selling for a dollar or a dollar and half. In order to make a profit selling the books so cheaply, Beadle & Adams used several cost cutting strategies... Their key series included the Beadle’s Dime Novel Series, the Dime Library, The Fireside Library patterned after The Lakeside Library, a juvenile series known as the Half-Dime Library in 1877 and in 1879 their first series devoted exclusively to women’s romances, The Waverley Library.

In certain periods the Beadle & Adams firm was also known as Irwin P. Beadle & Co. and as Beadle & Company.
