= Ho-Ho-Kus, New Jersey =

Borough in Bergen County, New Jersey, US

- Borough
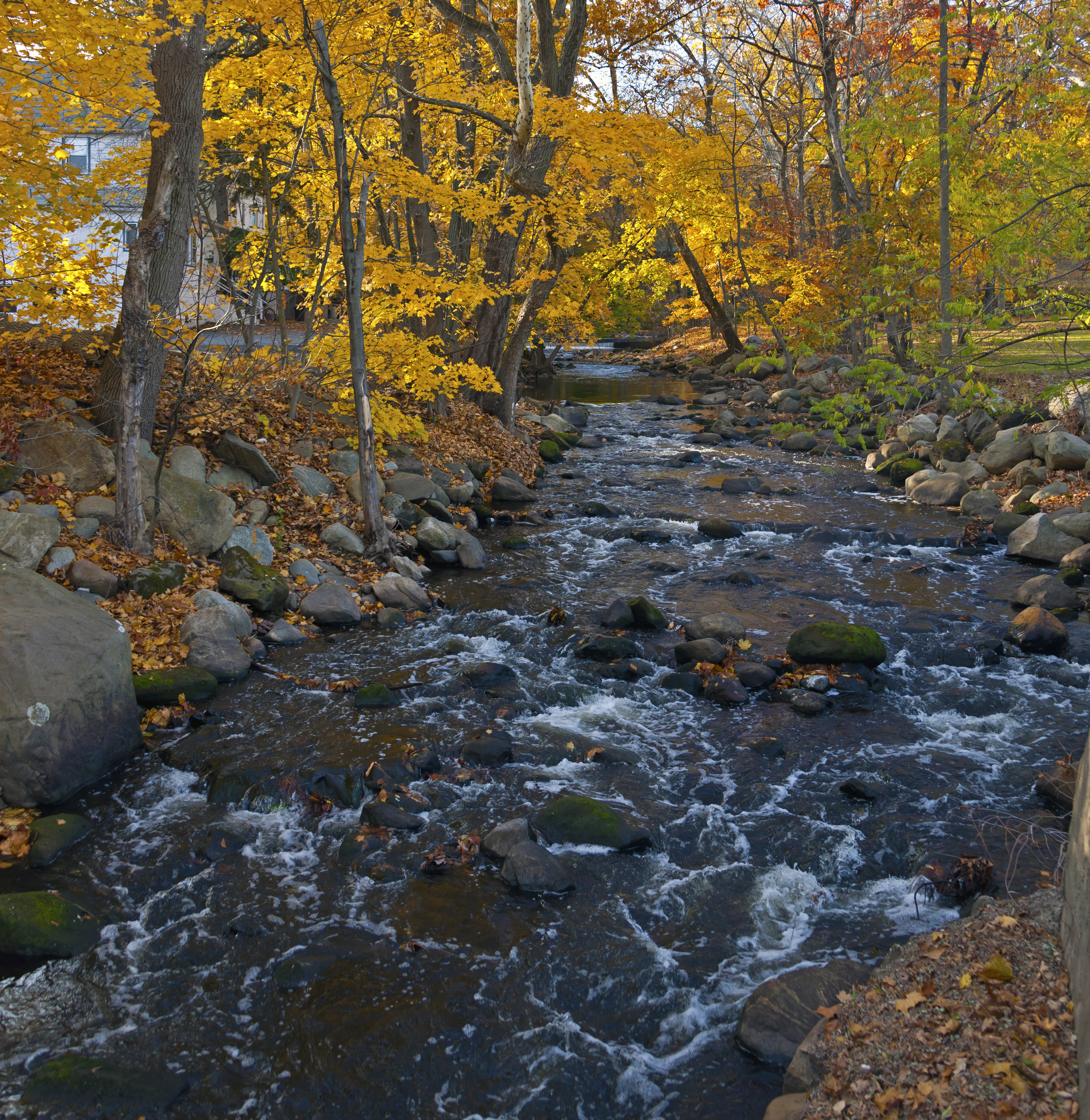
- The Ho-Ho-Kus Brook flowing through downtown Ho-Ho-Kus

- Seal

- Location of Ho-Ho-Kus in Bergen County highlighted in red (left). Inset map: Location of Bergen County in New Jersey highlighted in orange (right).
- Interactive map of Ho-Ho-Kus, New Jersey
- Location in Bergen County Location in New Jersey Location in the United States
- Coordinates: 40.9995°N 74.0966°W
- Country: United States
- State: New Jersey
- County: Bergen
- Incorporated: March 8, 1905 (as Orvil)
- Reincorporated: October 12, 1908 (as Ho-Ho-Kus)

Government
  - Type: Borough
  - Body: Borough Council
  - Mayor: Thomas W. Randall (R, term ends December 31, 2027)
  - Administrator: William J. Jones
  - Municipal clerk: Joan Herve

Area
  - Total: 1.75 sq mi (4.53 km^{2})
  - Land: 1.74 sq mi (4.51 km^{2})
  - Water: 0.012 sq mi (0.03 km^{2}) 0.63%
  - Rank: 425th of 565 in state 53rd of 70 in county
- Elevation: 121 ft (37 m)

Population (2020)
  - Total: 4,258
  - Estimate (2023): 4,232
  - Rank: 407th of 565 in state 63rd of 70 in county
  - Density: 2,447.9/sq mi (945.1/km^{2})
  - Rank: 256th of 565 in state 52nd of 70 in county
- Demonym: Ho-Ho-Kusite
- Time zone: UTC−05:00 (Eastern (EST))
  - Summer (DST): UTC−04:00 (Eastern (EDT))
- ZIP Code: 07423
- Area code: 201
- FIPS code: 3400332310
- GNIS feature ID: 0885258
- Website: www.hhkborough.com

Ho-Ho-Kus (English pronunciation: /hoʊˈhoʊkəs/) is a borough in Bergen County, in the U.S. state of New Jersey. As of the 2020 United States census, the borough's population was 4,258, an increase of 180 (+4.4%) from the 2010 census count of 4,078, which in turn reflected an increase of 18 (+0.4%) from the 4,060 counted in the 2000 census. The borough is the home of several historical landmarks, including the Ho-Ho-Kus Inn and The Hermitage.

Ho-Ho-Kus was incorporated as a borough by an act of the New Jersey Legislature on October 12, 1908, from what had originally been the borough of Orvil, which was in turn created on March 8, 1905, from portions of Orvil Township.

As of the 2000 census, Ho-Ho-Kus was the 15th-wealthiest community in New Jersey with a per capita money income of $63,594 as of 1999, an increase of 36.9% from the $46,451 recorded in 1989. The borough's median household income was $165,827 in 2013. In 2011, New Jersey Monthly magazine named Ho-Ho-Kus the best place to live in the state of New Jersey, citing its affluence, low crime rate and the quality of its school system, as well as its proximity to New York City and other major commercial destinations.

== History of the name ==
The meaning of the name Ho-Ho-Kus is disputed. From the official history on the borough's website, the most likely origin is a contraction of the Delaware Indian term "Mah-Ho-Ho-Kus" (or "Mehokhokus"), meaning "the red cedar".

Other meanings have been suggested over the years and are listed on the borough's website, including: a Lenape word for running water; a cleft in the rock, or under the rock, or hollow rock; the word "hohokes", signifying the whistle of the wind against the bark of trees; the Chihohokies Indians, whose chief lived here; the Dutch Hoog Akers for "high acorns" or Hoge Aukers for "high oaks"; the Lenape word hoccus, meaning "fox", or woakus, meaning "gray fox"; or that the "Ho" part means joy or spirit, and the rest of the name comes from "hohokes", referring to a type of tree bark.

=== Ho-Ho-Kus versus Hohokus ===
A constant source of confusion has been the manner in which the borough's name has been styled, with each syllable capitalized and separated by hyphens. The confusion is only exacerbated by the existence of Hohokus Township (now Mahwah), which comprised the area of present-day Ho-Ho-Kus and other surrounding communities, yet was styled without the multiple capitalization or the hyphens.

The name "Ho-Ho-Kus" was used explicitly in the resolution requesting a change of name passed by the Borough Council on October 12, 1908, and submitted to the Secretary of State of New Jersey requesting "That the Borough now known as the Borough of Orvil be hereafter known as the Borough of Ho-Ho-Kus..."

A few theories have been offered for the hyphens and capitalization. One is that it was intended to differentiate between the borough and Hohokus Township, which was formed on April 9, 1849, and continued to exist until November 7, 1944, when a referendum was passed changing the name to present-day Mahwah. Another explanation was that it was meant to avoid confusion by postal clerks with mail being sent to Hoboken.

While efforts had been made in the ensuing decades to change the name or to alter the way in which the name of the borough is capitalized and punctuated, the borough remains as "Ho-Ho-Kus."

== Geography ==
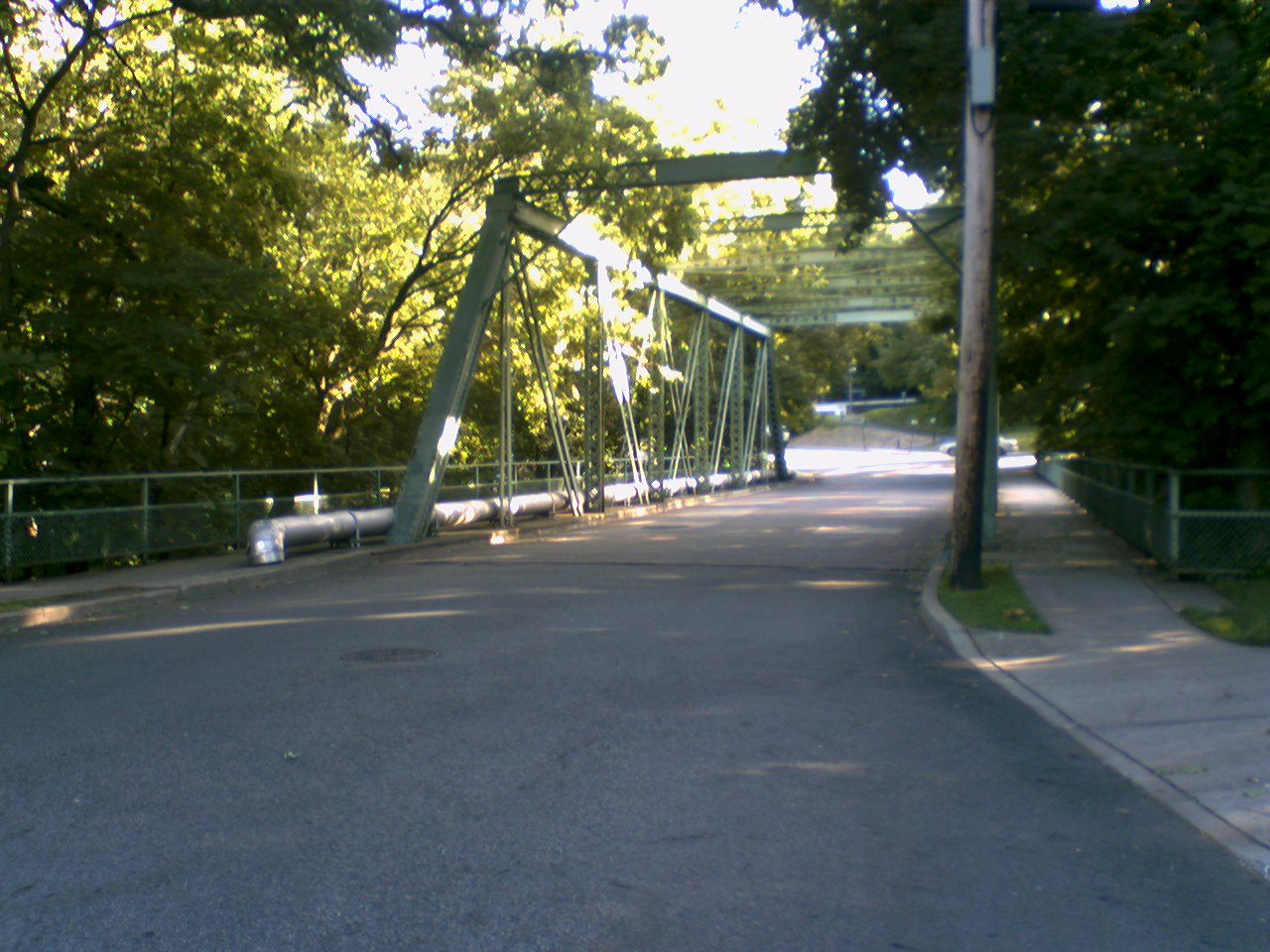
Warren Avenue Bridge crossing the Ho-Ho-Kus Brook

According to the United States Census Bureau, the borough had a total area of 1.75 square miles (4.53 km^{2}), including 1.74 square miles (4.51 km^{2}) of land and 0.01 square miles (0.03 km^{2}) of water (0.63%).

The borough borders Hillsdale, Ridgewood, Saddle River, Waldwick and Washington Township.

== Demographics ==
Historical population
Census	Pop.	Note	%±
1900	316		—
1910	488		54.4%
1920	586		20.1%
1930	925		57.8%
1940	1,626		75.8%
1950	2,254		38.6%
1960	3,988		76.9%
1970	4,348		9.0%
1980	4,129		−5.0%
1990	3,935		−4.7%
2000	4,060		3.2%
2010	4,078		0.4%
2020	4,258		4.4%
2023 (est.)	4,232	▼	−0.6%
Population sources: 1910–1920 1910; 1910–1930 1900–2020; 2000 2010 2020

=== Racial and ethnic composition ===
Ho-Ho-Kus borough, Bergen County, New Jersey – Racial and ethnic composition Note: the US Census treats Hispanic/Latino as an ethnic category. This table excludes Latinos from the racial categories and assigns them to a separate category. Hispanics/Latinos may be of any race.
Race / Ethnicity (NH = Non-Hispanic)	Pop 2000	Pop 2010	Pop 2020	% 2000	% 2010	% 2020
White alone (NH)	3,696	3,600	3,475	91.03%	88.28%	81.61%
Black or African American alone (NH)	20	9	26	0.49%	0.22%	0.61%
Native American or Alaska Native alone (NH)	3	3	1	0.07%	0.07%	0.02%
Asian alone (NH)	212	235	321	5.22%	5.76%	7.54%
Native Hawaiian or Pacific Islander alone (NH)	8	0	0	0.20%	0.00%	0.00%
Other race alone (NH)	7	6	19	0.17%	0.15%	0.45%
Mixed race or Multiracial (NH)	34	57	114	0.84%	1.40%	2.68%
Hispanic or Latino (any race)	80	168	302	1.97%	4.12%	7.09%
Total	4,060	4,078	4,258	100.00%	100.00%	100.00%

=== 2020 census ===
As of the 2020 census, Ho-Ho-Kus had a population of 4,258. The median age was 43.7 years. 27.2% of residents were under the age of 18 and 16.8% of residents were 65 years of age or older. For every 100 females there were 100.2 males, and for every 100 females age 18 and over there were 95.5 males age 18 and over.

100.0% of residents lived in urban areas, while 0.0% lived in rural areas.

There were 1,416 households in Ho-Ho-Kus, of which 43.0% had children under the age of 18 living in them. Of all households, 74.8% were married-couple households, 8.3% were households with a male householder and no spouse or partner present, and 15.0% were households with a female householder and no spouse or partner present. About 14.5% of all households were made up of individuals and 9.2% had someone living alone who was 65 years of age or older.

There were 1,473 housing units, of which 3.9% were vacant. The homeowner vacancy rate was 0.5% and the rental vacancy rate was 4.5%.

=== 2010 census ===
The 2010 United States census counted 4,078 people, 1,401 households, and 1,154 families in the borough. The population density was 2,350.3 per square mile (907.5/km^{2}). There were 1,462 housing units at an average density of 842.6 per square mile (325.3/km^{2}). The racial makeup was 92.03% (3,753) White, 0.22% (9) Black or African American, 0.07% (3) Native American, 5.79% (236) Asian, 0.00% (0) Pacific Islander, 0.39% (16) from other races, and 1.50% (61) from two or more races. Hispanic or Latino of any race were 4.12% (168) of the population.

Of the 1,401 households, 40.7% had children under the age of 18; 74.2% were married couples living together; 6.6% had a female householder with no husband present and 17.6% were non-families. Of all households, 15.5% were made up of individuals and 9.2% had someone living alone who was 65 years of age or older. The average household size was 2.91 and the average family size was 3.26.

29.3% of the population were under the age of 18, 4.6% from 18 to 24, 18.8% from 25 to 44, 31.5% from 45 to 64, and 16.0% who were 65 years of age or older. The median age was 43.3 years. For every 100 females, the population had 95.5 males. For every 100 females ages 18 and older there were 89.7 males.

The Census Bureau's 2006–2010 American Community Survey showed that (in 2010 inflation-adjusted dollars) median household income was $155,030 (with a margin of error of +/− $14,301) and the median family income was $157,202 (+/− $13,820). Males had a median income of $93,750 (+/− $26,877) versus $83,636 (+/− $27,361) for females. The per capita income for the borough was $67,238 (+/− $11,693). About 1.9% of families and 1.6% of the population were below the poverty line, including 0.6% of those under age 18 and 6.3% of those age 65 or over.

Same-sex couples headed 8 households in 2010, unchanged from 2000.

=== 2000 census ===
As of the 2000 United States census there were 4,060 people, 1,433 households, and 1,199 families residing in the borough. The population density was 2,331.1 inhabitants per square mile (900.0/km^{2}). There were 1,465 housing units at an average density of 841.2 per square mile (324.8/km^{2}). The racial makeup of the borough was 92.66% White, 0.59% African American, 0.10% Native American, 5.22% Asian, 0.20% Pacific Islander, 0.37% from other races, and 0.86% from two or more races. 1.97% of the population were Hispanic or Latino of any race.

There were 1,433 households, out of which 38.7% had children under the age of 18 living with them, 76.6% were married couples living together, 6.1% had a female householder with no husband present, and 16.3% were non-families. Of all households 14.6% were made up of individuals, and 7.1% had someone living alone who was 65 years of age or older. The average household size was 2.82 and the average family size was 3.11.

In the borough the population was spread out, with 27.5% under the age of 18, 3.3% from 18 to 24, 26.6% from 25 to 44, 27.3% from 45 to 64, and 15.2% who were 65 years of age or older. The median age was 41 years. For every 100 females, there were 91.9 males. For every 100 females age 18 and over, there were 88.2 males.

The median income for a household in the borough was $129,900, and the median income for a family was $144,588. Males had a median income of $92,573 versus $54,091 for females. The per capita income for the borough was $63,594. Of the population 2.1% of the people and 2.6% of families were below the poverty line. Of those 0.7% under the age of 18 and 1.6% of those 65 and older were living below the poverty line.

=== Affluence ===
Ho-Ho-Kus is primarily an upper-class and upper-middle class suburb of New York City, ranking 15th in the state of New Jersey in terms of per-capita income. According to the Forbes 2010 survey of the most expensive ZIP codes in America, Ho-Ho-Kus ranked 268th nationally, with a median home price of $901,841.

The Ho-Ho-Kus School District is classified in District Factor Group "J," the highest of eight categories, in both the 2000 and 1990 rankings. District Factor Groups are used in the state of New Jersey to rank school districts according to common socioeconomic characteristics. Northern Highlands Regional High School, which receives students from Ho-Ho-Kus, Allendale, Upper Saddle River, and part of Saddle River, is placed in the same category.

== Points of interest ==
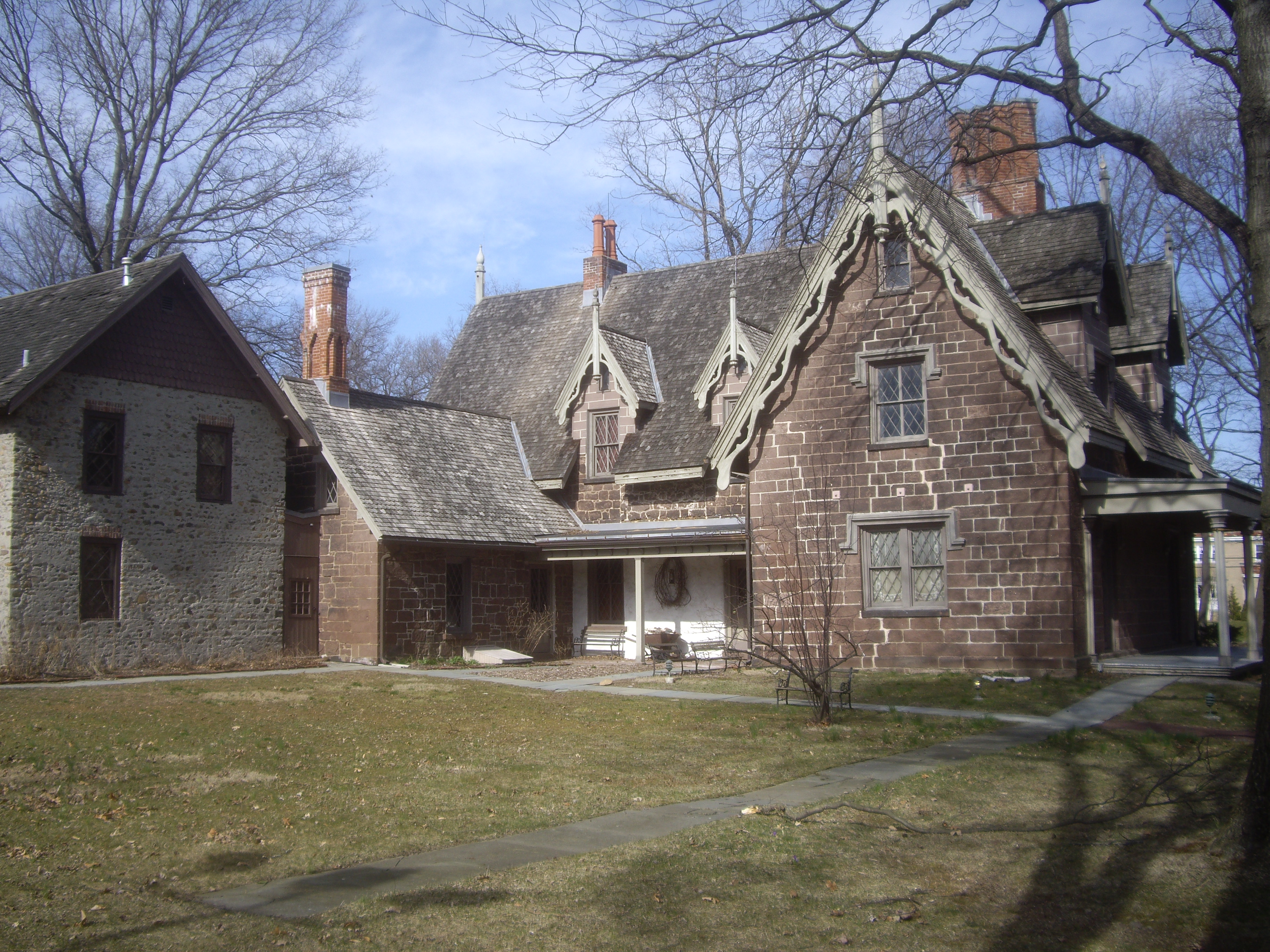
The Hermitage, a historic site listed on the National Register of Historic Places

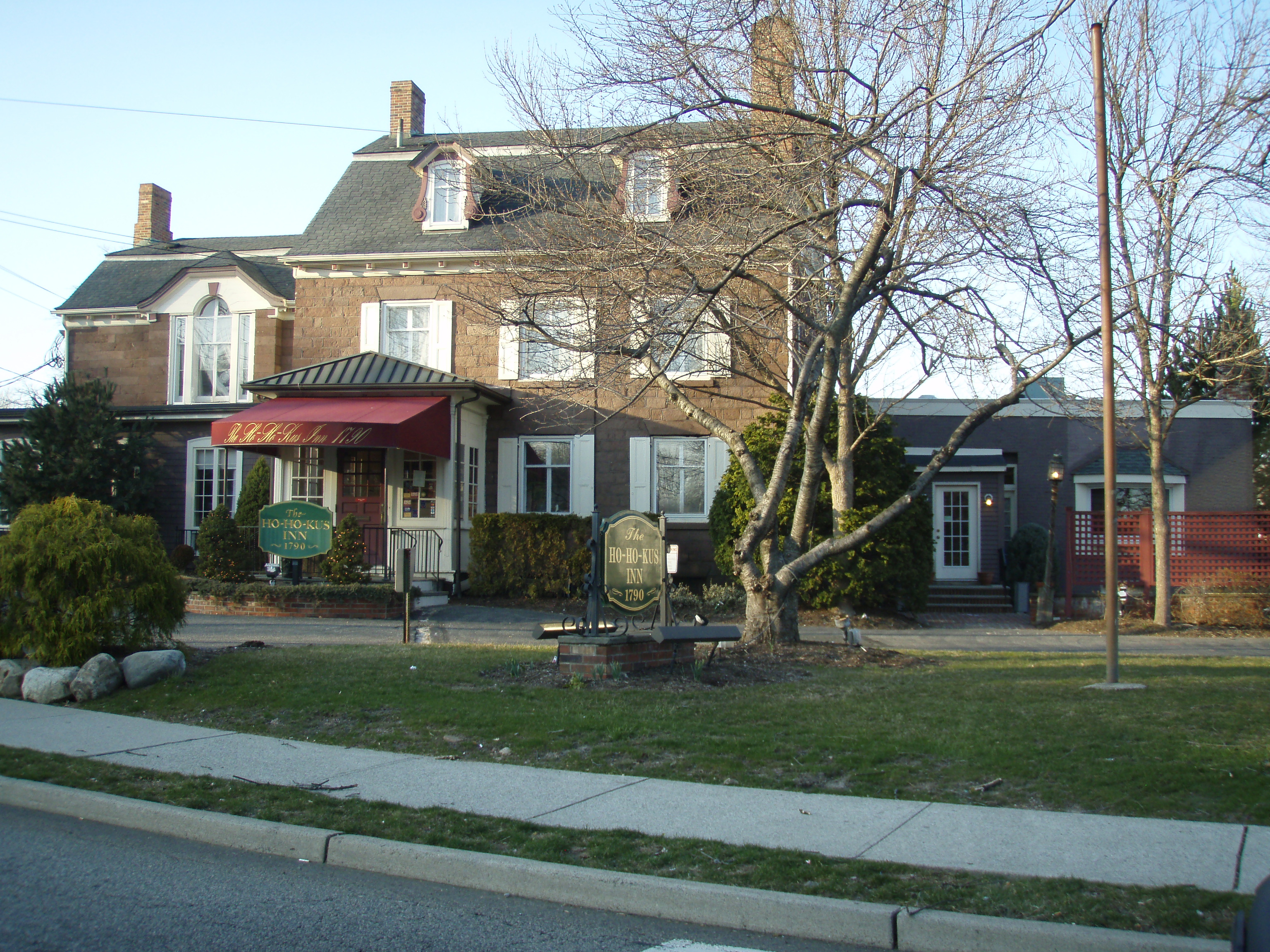
The Ho-Ho-Kus Inn, a historic landmark

- The Hermitage, site of Aaron Burr's marriage, listed on the National Register of Historic Places
- The Ho-Ho-Kus Inn (also known as Ho-Ho-Kus Inn & Tavern), is a historic landmark that is currently a restaurant.

== Government ==
=== Local government ===
Ho-Ho-Kus is governed under the borough form of New Jersey municipal government, which is used in 218 municipalities (of the 564) statewide, making it the most common form of government in New Jersey. The governing body is comprised of a mayor and a borough council, with all positions elected at-large on a partisan basis as part of the November general election. A mayor is elected directly by the voters to a four-year term of office. The borough council includes six members elected to serve three-year terms on a staggered basis, with two seats coming up for election each year in a three-year cycle. The borough form of government used by Ho-Ho-Kus is a "weak mayor / strong council" government in which council members act as the legislative body with the mayor presiding at meetings and voting only in the event of a tie. The mayor can veto ordinances subject to an override by a two-thirds majority vote of the council. The mayor makes committee and liaison assignments for council members, and most appointments are made by the mayor with the advice and consent of the council.

As of 2025, the mayor of Ho-Ho-Kus is Republican Thomas W. Randall, whose term of office ends December 31, 2027. Members of the Borough Council are Council President Douglas K. Troast (R, 2027), Kevin Crossley (R, 2025), Edmund M. Iannelli (R, 2026), Kathleen Moran (R, 2025), Dane M. Policastro (R, 2024) and Steven D. Shell (R, 2026).

In February 2020, Kathleen Moran was selected from three candidates nominated by the Republican municipal committee to fill the seat expiring in December 2022 that had been held by Philip Rorty until he resigned from office earlier that month. Moran served on an interim basis until the November 2020 general election, when she was elected to serve the balance of the term of office.

Thomas Fiato was selected in January 2016 from a list of three candidates nominated by the municipal Republican committee to fill the seat of Kimberley Weiss, who had resigned earlier that month after announcing that she was relocating out of the borough.

William J. Jones is the Borough Administrator.

=== Federal, state and county representation ===
Ho-Ho-Kus is located in New Jersey's 5th congressional district and is part of the New Jersey's 39th legislative district.

For the 119th United States Congress, New Jersey's 5th congressional district is represented by Josh Gottheimer (D, Wyckoff). New Jersey is represented in the United States Senate by Democrats Cory Booker (Newark, term ends 2027) and Andy Kim (Moorestown, term ends 2031).

For the 2026–2027 session, the 39th legislative district of the New Jersey Legislature is represented in the State Senate by Holly Schepisi (R, River Vale) and in the General Assembly by Robert Auth (R, Old Tappan) and John V. Azzariti (R, Saddle River).

Bergen County is governed by a directly elected County Executive, with legislative functions performed by a Board of County Commissioners comprised of seven members who are elected at-large to three-year terms in partisan elections on a staggered basis, with either two or three seats coming up for election each November; a Chairman and Vice Chairman are selected from among its seven members at a reorganization meeting held every January. As of 2025, the county executive is James J. Tedesco III (D, Paramus), whose four-year term of office ends December 31, 2026.

Bergen County's Commissioners are Chair Mary J. Amoroso (D, Mahwah, 2025), Vice Chair Steven A. Tanelli (D, North Arlington, 2027), Chair Pro Tem Joan Voss (D, Fort Lee, 2026), Rafael Marte (D, Bergenfield, 2026), Germaine M. Ortiz (D, Emerson, 2025), Thomas J. Sullivan Jr. (D, Montvale, 2025) and Tracy Silna Zur (D, Franklin Lakes, 2027).

Bergen County's elected constitutional officials are Clerk John S. Hogan (D, Northvale, 2026), Sheriff Anthony Cureton (D, Englewood, 2027) and Surrogate Michael R. Dressler (D, Cresskill, 2026).

=== Politics ===
As of March 2011, there was a total of 2,981 registered voters in Ho-Ho-Kus, of whom 546 (18.3% vs. 31.7% countywide) were registered as Democrats, 1,456 (48.8% vs. 21.1%) were registered as Republicans and 976 (32.7% vs. 47.1%) were registered as Unaffiliated. There were 3 voters registered as Libertarians or Greens. Among the borough's 2010 Census population, 73.1% (vs. 57.1% in Bergen County) were registered to vote, including 103.3% of those ages 18 and over (vs. 73.7% countywide).

Gubernatorial election results for Ho-Ho-Kus
Year	Republican		Democratic		Third party(ies)	
Year	No.	%	No.	%	No.	%
2025	1,064	50.79%	1,028	49.07%	3	0.14%
2021	990	56.44%	757	43.16%	7	0.40%
2017	831	53.93%	662	42.96%	48	3.11%
2013	1,085	74.42%	358	24.55%	15	1.03%
2009	1,063	62.71%	553	32.63%	79	4.66%
2005	1,002	62.90%	565	35.47%	26	1.63%

In the 2016 presidential election, Republican Donald Trump received 1,171 votes (48.1% vs. 41.1% countywide), ahead of Democrat Hillary Clinton with 1,131 votes (46.5% vs. 54.2%) and other candidates with 131 votes (5.4% vs. 4.6%), among the 2,462 ballots cast by the borough's 3,234 registered voters, for a turnout of 76.1% (vs. 72.5% in Bergen County). In the 2012 presidential election, Republican Mitt Romney received 1,447 votes (62.8% vs. 43.5% countywide), ahead of Democrat Barack Obama with 826 votes (35.9% vs. 54.8%) and other candidates with 21 votes (0.9% vs. 0.9%), among the 2,303 ballots cast by the borough's 3,116 registered voters, for a turnout of 73.9% (vs. 70.4% in Bergen County). In the 2008 presidential election, Republican John McCain received 1,440 votes (58.1% vs. 44.5% countywide), ahead of Democrat Barack Obama with 1,009 votes (40.7% vs. 53.9%) and other candidates with 15 votes (0.6% vs. 0.8%), among the 2,478 ballots cast by the borough's 3,066 registered voters, for a turnout of 80.8% (vs. 76.8% in Bergen County). In the 2004 presidential election, Republican George W. Bush received 1,547 votes (62.2% vs. 47.2% countywide), ahead of Democrat John Kerry with 916 votes (36.8% vs. 51.7%) and other candidates with 18 votes (0.7% vs. 0.7%), among the 2,489 ballots cast by the borough's 2,987 registered voters, for a turnout of 83.3% (vs. 76.9% in the whole county).

Presidential elections results
Year	Republican	Democratic
2024	46.3% 1,197	50.4% 1,305
2020	44.3% 1,292	53.2% 1,550
2016	48.1% 1,171	46.5% 1,131
2012	62.8% 1,447	35.9% 826
2008	58.1% 1,440	40.7% 1,009
2004	62.2% 1,547	36.8% 916

In the 2013 gubernatorial election, Republican Chris Christie received 74.4% of the vote (1,085 cast), ahead of Democrat Barbara Buono with 24.6% (358 votes), and other candidates with 1.0% (15 votes), among the 1,479 ballots cast by the borough's 3,042 registered voters (21 ballots were spoiled), for a turnout of 48.6%. In the 2009 gubernatorial election, Republican Chris Christie received 1,063 votes (62.5% vs. 45.8% countywide), ahead of Democrat Jon Corzine with 553 votes (32.5% vs. 48.0%), Independent Chris Daggett with 76 votes (4.5% vs. 4.7%) and other candidates with 3 votes (0.2% vs. 0.5%), among the 1,701 ballots cast by the borough's 3,024 registered voters, yielding a 56.3% turnout (vs. 50.0% in the county).

United States Senate election results for Ho-Ho-Kus1
Year	Republican		Democratic		Third party(ies)	
Year	No.	%	No.	%	No.	%
2024	1,270	50.48%	1,217	48.37%	29	1.15%
2018	1,112	58.56%	750	39.49%	37	1.95%
2012	1,325	62.18%	772	36.23%	34	1.60%
2006	1,025	61.01%	625	37.20%	30	1.79%

United States Senate election results for Ho-Ho-Kus2
Year	Republican		Democratic		Third party(ies)	
Year	No.	%	No.	%	No.	%
2020	1,422	49.41%	1,426	49.55%	30	1.04%
2014	841	56.18%	633	42.28%	23	1.54%
2013	539	54.78%	436	44.31%	9	0.91%
2008	1,348	60.04%	877	39.06%	20	0.89%

== Education ==
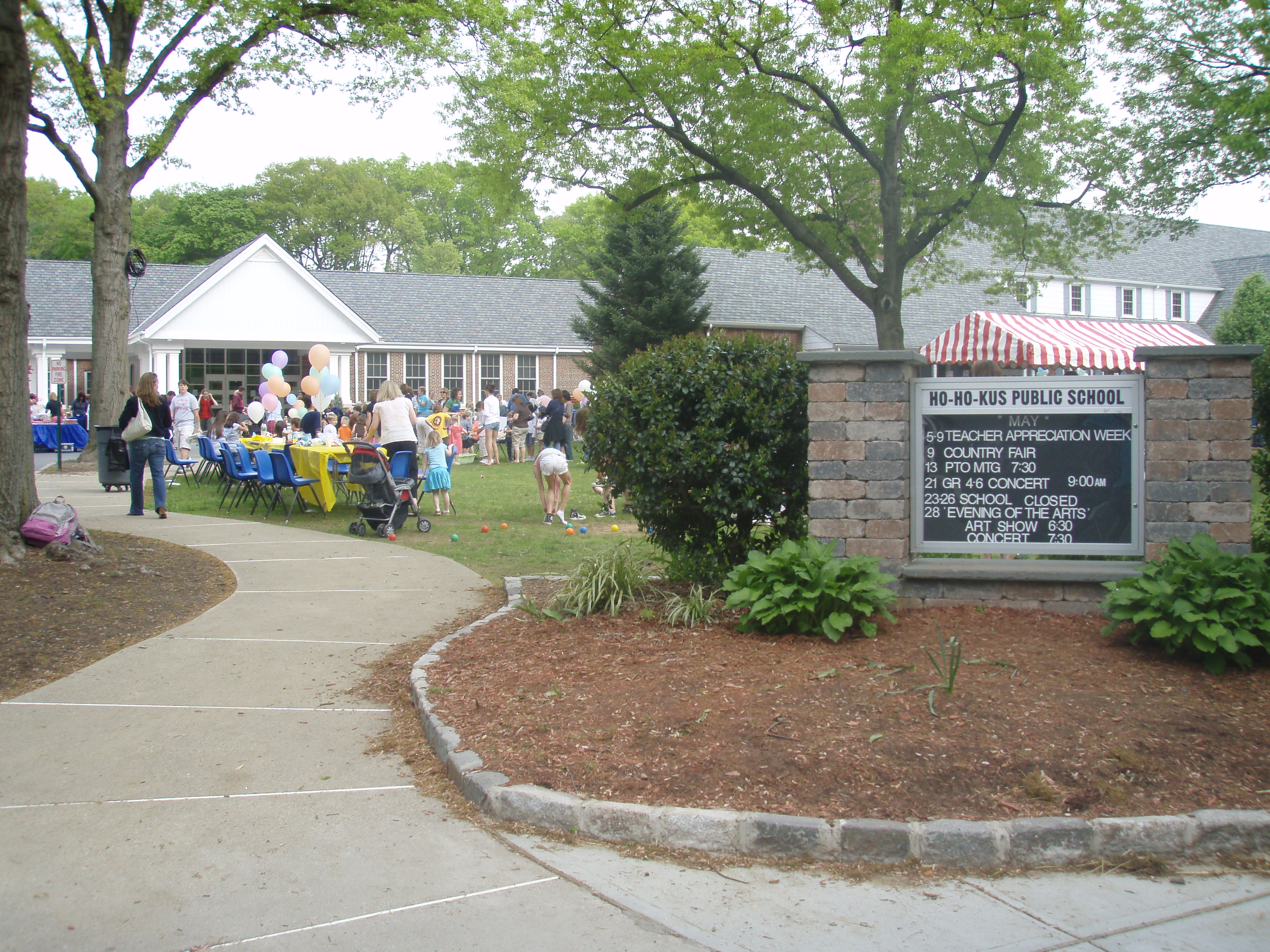
Ho-Ho-Kus Public School hosts a "Country Fair"

The Ho-Ho-Kus School District serves public school students in pre-kindergarten through eighth grade at Ho-Ho-Kus Public School. As of the 2024–25 school year, the district, comprised of one school, had an enrollment of 584 students and 47.9 classroom teachers (on an FTE basis), for a student–teacher ratio of 12.2:1.

Public school students in Ho-Ho-Kus for ninth through twelfth grades attend Northern Highlands Regional High School, which also serves students from Allendale, Upper Saddle River and some of Saddle River's students (who have the option of attending either Northern Highlands or Ramsey High School, as part of sending/receiving relationships with the two districts). In 2016, the Ho-Ho-Kus and Northern Highlands districts reached an agreement to extend the send / receive agreement through 2026 under a fixed-price contract by which Ho-Ho-Kus would pay $3.6 million for the 2016-17 school year, escalating by 2% a year to $4.3 million in 2025-26, regardless of the number of students from the borough sent to the high school. As of the 2024–25 school year, the high school had an enrollment of 1,257 students and 109.7 classroom teachers (on an FTE basis), for a student–teacher ratio of 11.5:1. The ten voting seats on the high school district's board of education are allocated based on a percentage of the enrollment coming from each constituent municipality, with one seat allocated to Ho-Ho-Kus.

Public school students from the borough, and all of Bergen County, are eligible to attend the secondary education programs offered by the Bergen County Technical Schools, which include the Bergen County Academies in Hackensack, and the Bergen Tech campus in Teterboro or Paramus. The district offers programs on a shared-time or full-time basis, with admission based on a selective application process and tuition covered by the student's home school district.

The borough is home to the Ho-Ho-Kus Waldwick Cooperative Nursery School.

== Transportation ==
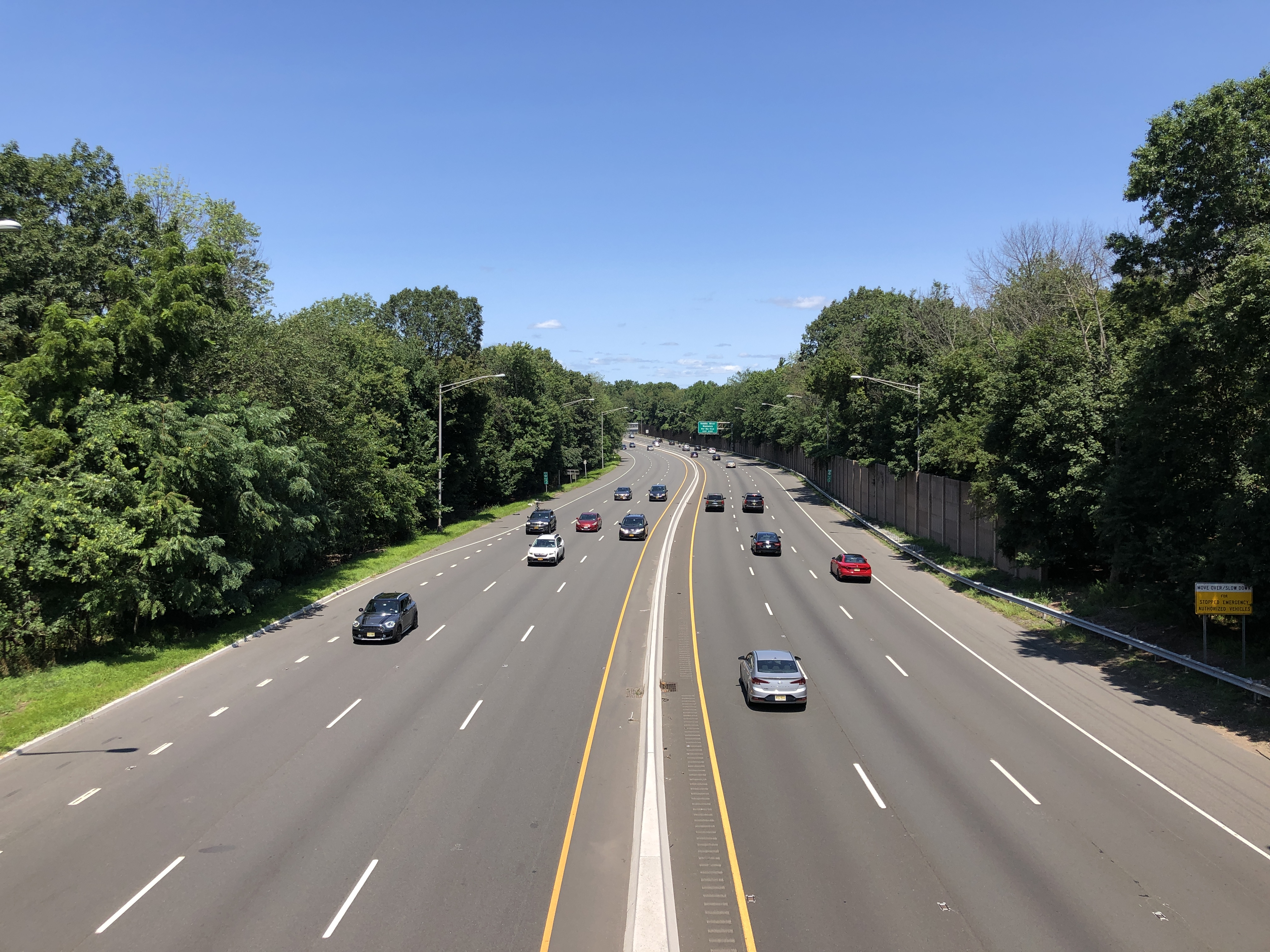
Route 17 northbound in Ho-Ho-Kus

=== Roads and highways ===
As of May 2010, the borough had a total of 26.52 miles (42.68 km) of roadways, of which 19.50 miles (31.38 km) were maintained by the municipality, 6.01 miles (9.67 km) by Bergen County and 1.01 miles (1.63 km) by the New Jersey Department of Transportation.

Route 17, County Route 507 and County Route 502 travel through Ho-Ho-Kus. The borough can also be accessed via exit 168 on the Garden State Parkway in neighboring Washington Township.

=== Public transportation ===
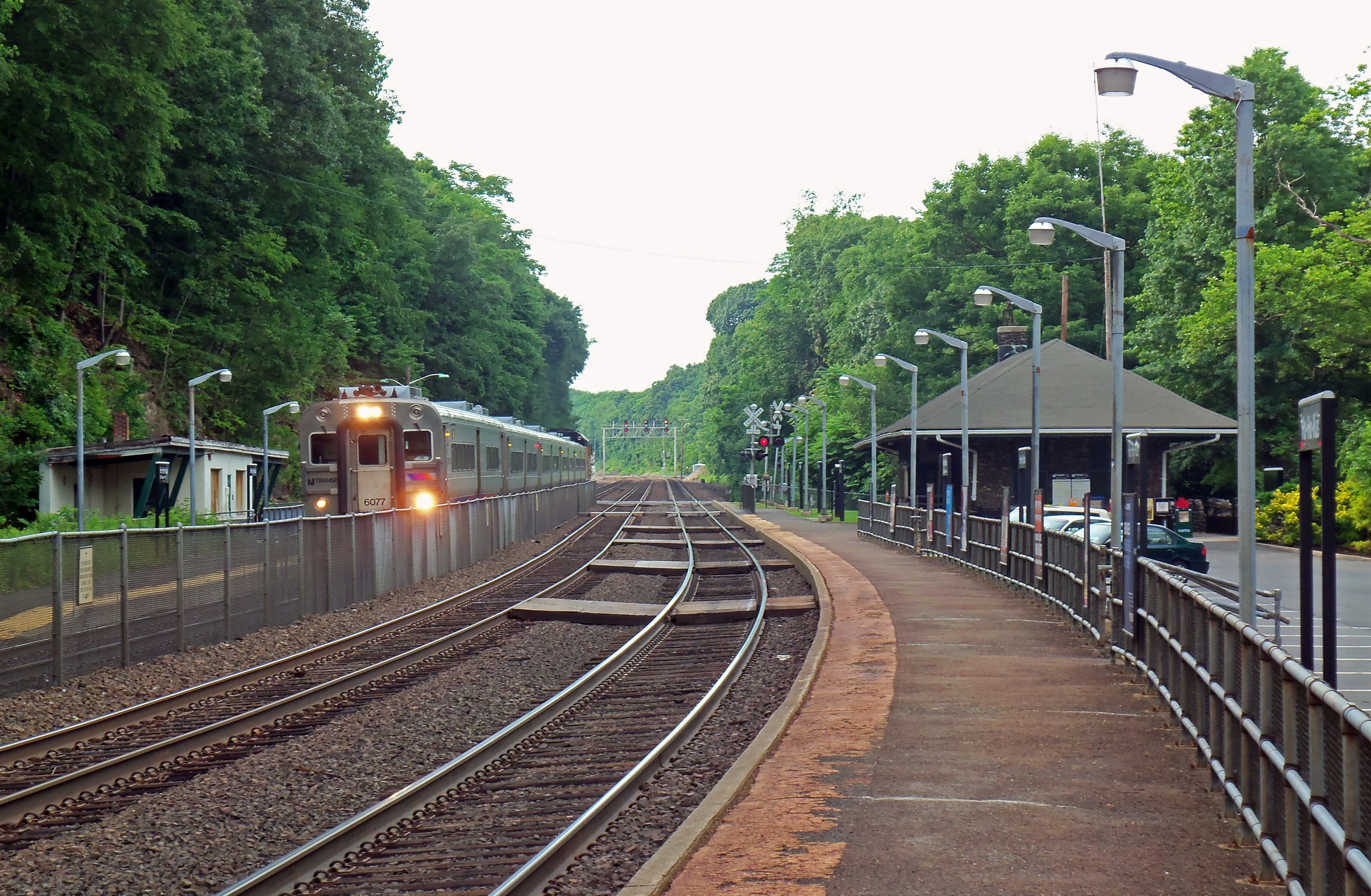
NJ Transit's Ho-Ho-Kus station, at Brookside Avenue and 1st Street, serves both the Main Line and the Bergen County Line

NJ Transit provides commuter rail service at the Ho-Ho-Kus station, which is located at Brookside Avenue and 1st Street, one block from Franklin Turnpike. The station provides service on both the Bergen County Line and Main Line, which run north–south to Hoboken Terminal with connections via the Secaucus Junction transfer station to New York Penn Station and to other NJ Transit rail service. Connections are available at the Hoboken Terminal to other NJ Transit rail lines, the PATH train at the Hoboken PATH station, New York Waterways ferry service to the World Financial Center and other destinations and Hudson-Bergen Light Rail service.

Short Line provides service between the borough and the Port Authority Bus Terminal in Midtown Manhattan from a stop at Route 17 and Hollywood Avenue, with limited service offered at a stop at Franklin Turnpike and Maple Avenue.

== In popular culture ==
The heavy metal band Twisted Sister, best known for the songs "We're Not Gonna Take It" and "I Wanna Rock", were based in Ho-Ho-Kus.

The characters in Frank Henenlotter's film Frankenhooker (1990) live in Ho-Ho-Kus.

Parts of the 2004 novel Just One Look by Harlan Coben are set in Ho-Ho-Kus.

== Notable people ==
People who were born in, residents of, or otherwise closely associated with Ho-Ho-Kus include:

- Aaron Burr (1756–1836), third Vice President of the United States, was married at The Hermitage and briefly lived there
- Richard Chilton (born 1958), businessman, investor and philanthropist
- Doug Cook (born 1948), former professional basketball player
- David Duffield (born 1940), businessman and founder of Information Associates, Integral Software Systems, Business Software, PeopleSoft and Workday
- Mark Fabish (born 1975), American football coach and former player who is the interim head coach for the Columbia Lions
- Jim Fassel (1949–2021), head coach of the New York Giants
- Andrew McMahon (born 1982), musician / singer-songwriter who has been lead singer of Jack's Mannequin and Something Corporate
- Dennis McNerney, former County Executive of Bergen County
- Owen Murphy (1893–1965), songwriter, film maker, and writer for radio, film, and theatre
- Henry Pearson (born 1999), tight end who played in the NFL for the Green Bay Packers
- Dan Reeves (1944–2022), former running back of the Dallas Cowboys, former head coach of the New York Giants
- R. Tom Sawyer (1901–1986), engineer, writer and inventor of the first successful gas turbine locomotive
- Chloe Troast (born 1997), comedian and actress, who joined the cast of the NBC sketch comedy series Saturday Night Live in 2023 for its 49th season
- Metta Victoria Fuller Victor (1831–1885), novelist, credited with authoring of one of the first American detective novels who wrote more than 100 dime novels, pioneering the field
- Orville James Victor (1827–1910), theologian, journalist, editor and abolitionist who has been called the creator of the dime novel
- Richard Warch (1939–2013), 14th president of Lawrence University
- Luke Wypler (born 2001), American football center for the Cleveland Browns

== Sources ==
- Municipal Incorporations of the State of New Jersey (according to Counties) prepared by the Division of Local Government, Department of the Treasury (New Jersey); December 1, 1958.
- Clayton, W. Woodford; and Nelson, William. History of Bergen and Passaic Counties, New Jersey, with Biographical Sketches of Many of its Pioneers and Prominent Men. Philadelphia: Everts and Peck, 1882.
- Harvey, Cornelius Burnham (ed.), Genealogical History of Hudson and Bergen Counties, New Jersey. New York: New Jersey Genealogical Publishing Co., 1900.
- Hudson, Sue F., Background of Ho-Ho-Kus History, under the auspices of the Woman's Club of Ho-Ho-Kus, New Jersey, 1953
- Van Valen, James M. History of Bergen County, New Jersey. New York: New Jersey Publishing and Engraving Co., 1900.
- Westervelt, Frances A. (Frances Augusta), 1858–1942, History of Bergen County, New Jersey, 1630–1923, Lewis Historical Publishing Company, 1923.
