= Ho-Ho-Kus Inn =

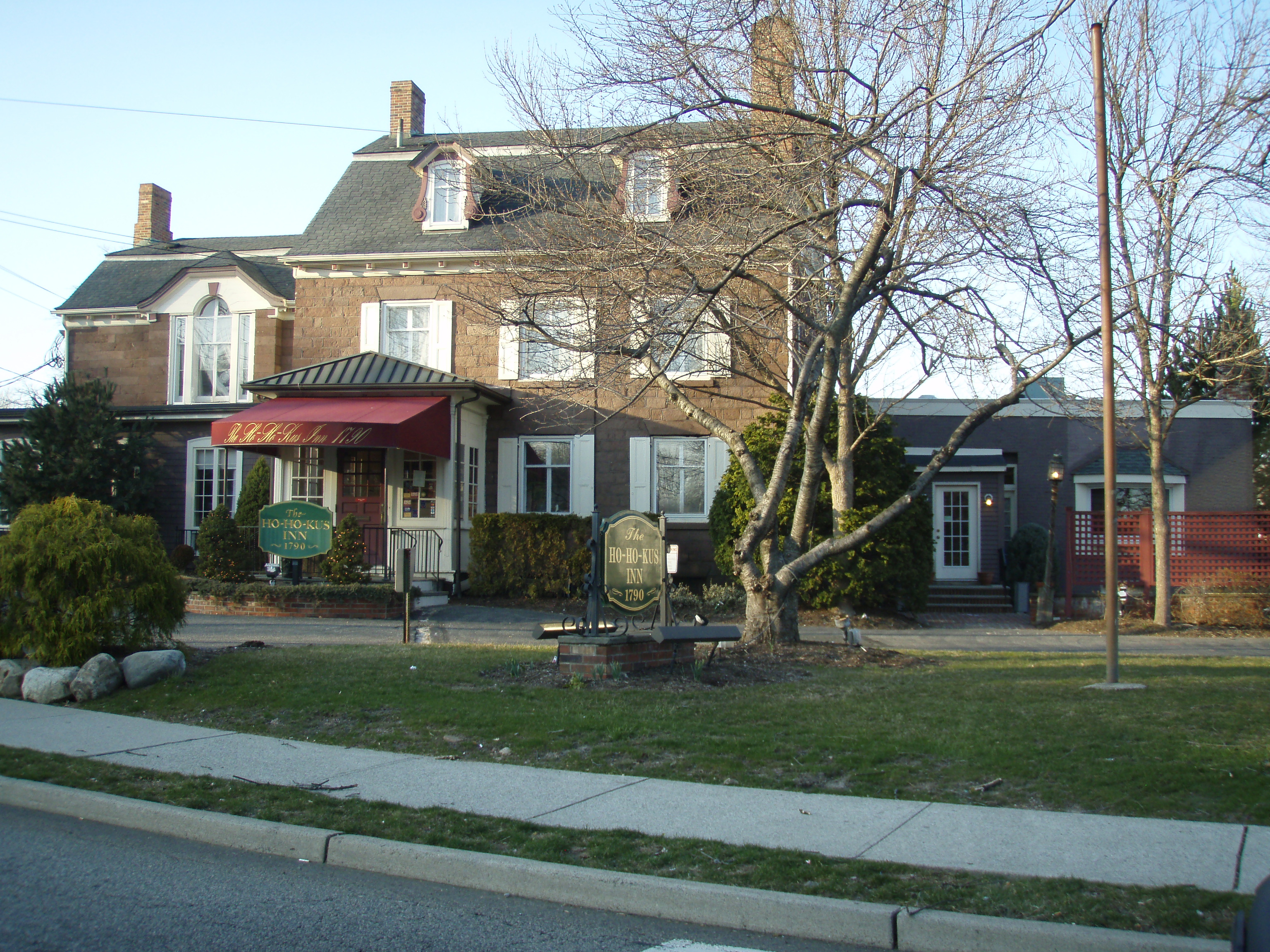
- Ho-Ho-Kus Inn in 2008
- Interactive map of Ho-Ho-Kus Inn

Restaurant information
- Location: 1 East Franklin Turnpike, Ho-Ho-Kus, New Jersey, 07423, United States
- Coordinates: 40°59′52″N 74°06′35″W
- Website: hohokusinn.com

Ho-Ho-Kus Inn (also known as Ho-Ho-Kus Inn & Tavern) is a historic landmark that is currently a restaurant located in Ho-Ho-Kus, New Jersey, United States, at the intersection of Franklin Turnpike, Maple Avenue, and Sheridan Avenue. Its name was taken from a Delaware Indian term meaning "the red ceder". Established in 1790, The Ho-Ho-Kus Inn was once known as The Mansion House and consists of five rooms: Chateau, Crystal, Hermitage, Tap, and Zabriskie.

== History ==
The Ho-Ho-Kus Inn was originally a private residence built for John "Jake" Zabriskie in 1790. After his death the house was converted into a private church and served as a parsonage for the Christ Episcopal Church in Ringwood. During this time the Ho-Ho-Kus Inn had been referred to by several nicknames such as Zabriskie House, the Villa Inn, The Mansion House, the Wayside Inn, and the Washington Inn.

The building later became a resting house for the New York elite until 1920 and was referred to as Mansion House during this time. In 1920 the house faced demolition but was saved by Mrs. H.T.B. Jacquelin. In 1941 the house was purchased by the town and became a landmark and was leased to several people. In 2007 the restaurant was bought by Chris Kelly. Kelly had asked George Zahakos and Catherine Stauch, formerly of the Bicycle Club in Englewood Cliffs, to take over the restaurant. However, this deal has fallen through.

== Reviews ==
The Ho-Ho-Kus Inn is currently a Zagat rated restaurant.

In 2008, The New York Times food critic David Corcoran has given high praises to the manager Rob Lipkin for his energetic attitude and for importing first-rate wine from regions like Chile and South Africa. Lipkin won awards as sommelier at the Petit Chateau in Bernardsville. He also praised the chef, Jesus Murillo, for his grilled ostrich which he described as "remarkably tender and juicy, bolstered by a zesty cherry chutney".
