= West Shore (magazine) =

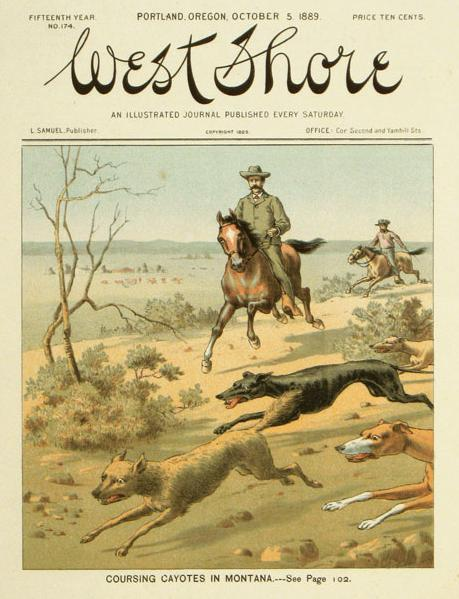
- West Shore cover, 5 October 1889
- Editor: Henry L. Wells
- Frequency: Monthly 1875-1889; then weekly 1889-1891
- Circulation: 15,000 (peak)
- Publisher: Leopold Samuel
- First issue: August 1875
- Final issue: May 1891
- Company: West Shore Publishing Company
- Country: United States
- Based in: Portland, Oregon
- Language: English

The West Shore was a literary magazine published in Portland, Oregon, United States from 1875 to 1891. It was founded by Leopold Samuel to promote a positive image of the Pacific Northwest and to encourage economic growth in the region. The magazine was known for publishing excellent articles by well-known authors and for its many high-quality illustrations. As a result, West Shore became one of the most successful publications in the Pacific Northwest. Its finely executed illustrations showed the scenery, architecture, and commerce of Oregon, Washington, California, Idaho, Montana, British Columbia, and Alaska. Today, West Shore illustrations provide a detailed record of the Pacific Northwest as it existed in the second half of the nineteenth century.

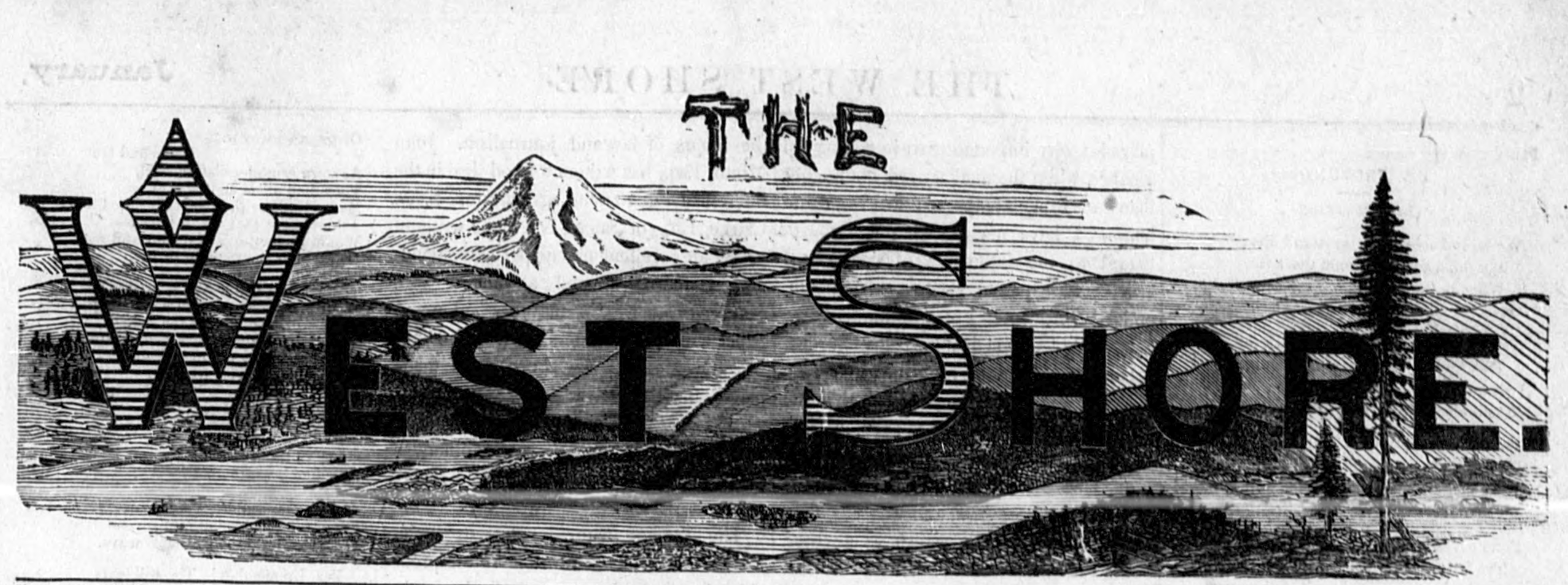
Masthead from Vol. 1

== History ==
West Shore was founded by Leopold Samuel, a German immigrant who settled in Portland in 1871. Shortly after arriving in Portland, Samuel published an Oregon travel guide. Samuel then compiled and published an illustrated directory for the city of Portland. The directory was modestly successful. After publishing three annual editions of the directory, Samuel decided to begin publishing a monthly literary magazine, West Shore. The first edition of the magazine was published in August 1875.

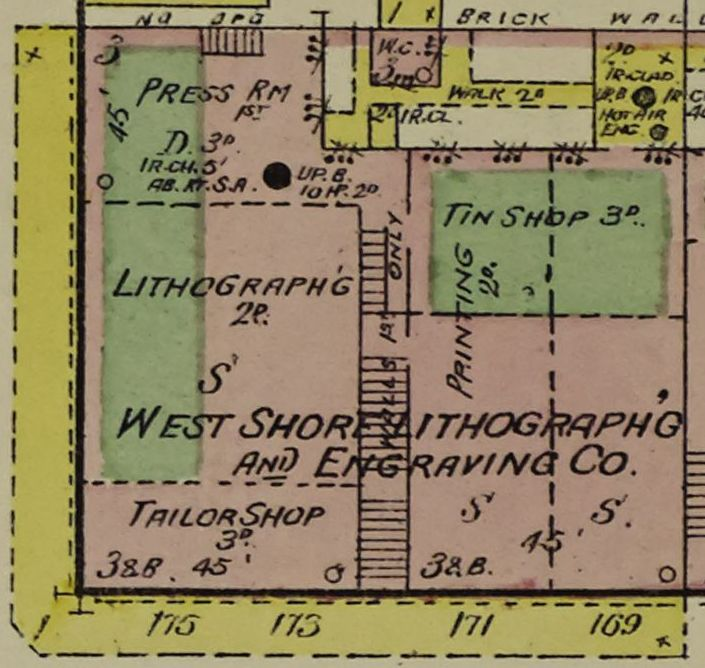
1889 map of West Shore Lithographing and Engraving Company with Press Room in Portland by the Sanborn Fire Insurance Company

In the first issue of West Shore, Samuel announced his goal was to create the best literary journal in the Pacific Northwest by securing contributions from the brightest intellects and writers in the region. Samuel followed through on his promise by publishing poetry by Joaquin Miller, essays by historian Frances Fuller Victor, scientific studies by paleontologist Thomas Condon, and history articles by pioneer Lindsay Applegate and former Governor of Oregon Joseph Lane. George H. Himes, secretary of the Oregon Pioneer Association, was a regular contributor to West Shore. Himes was later a founding member of the Oregon Historical Society and served as the society's curator for twenty-five years.

The magazine's original format was an eight-page newspaper layout with four columns of text per page. Its illustrations were stock wood cuts purchased from eastern printing companies or from engravers in San Francisco. Nevertheless, the magazine was very successful. In less than two years, West Shore was being sold in thirty-two states, Canada, England, and Scotland. By 1878, the magazine's circulation was 8,160, the largest of any publication in the Pacific Northwest.

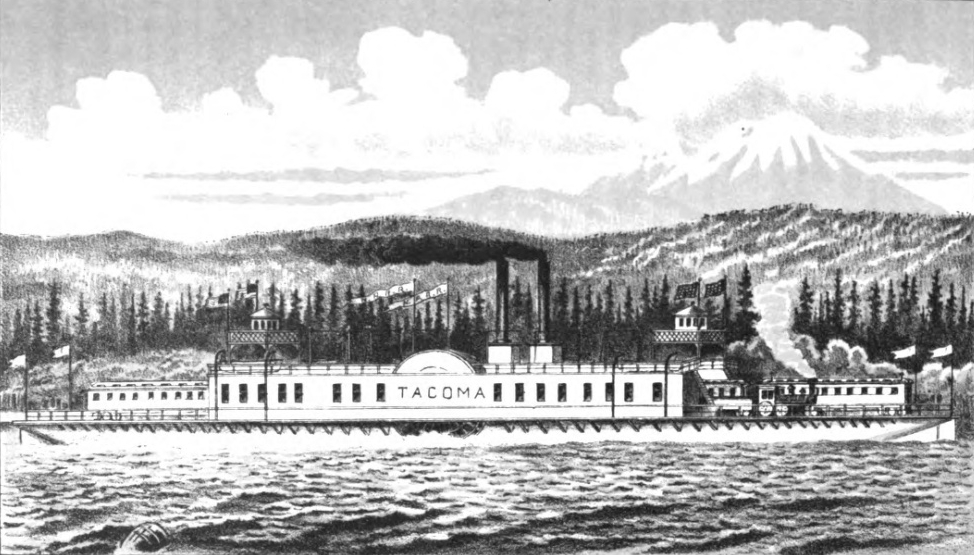
West Shore illustration of the Tacoma on the Columbia River

In September 1878, the magazine was increased from eight to thirty-two pages and high quality lithographic illustrations were introduced. Over the next few years, stock illustrations were phased out and replaced with original illustrations produced by the West Shore staff artists. In 1883, Samuel hired a full-time editor, Henry L. Wells. As editor, Wells increased the magazine's news and information content, focusing on feature story about the Pacific Northwest rather than literary articles. In January 1884, the magazine was increased to forty-eight pages per issue. Three years later, the format was enlarged to match Harper's Magazine and the magazine was expanded to seventy-two pages. In 1888, West Shore changed to a quarto format. In September 1889, Samuel decide to begin publishing West Shore as a weekly magazine. At about this time, noted author and poet Ella Higginson edited a women's department for the magazine.

West Shore reached its peak circulation of about 15,000 in 1890. In August of that year, Samuel enlarged the size of the pages. That turned out to be the magazine's last format change. In September, the West Shore Publishing Company was reorganized. Samuel remained president and general manager, but was forced to report to a board of directors made up of Portland area businessmen. Following the reorganization, plans for expanding the publication were announced along with new advertising contests and upcoming special editions. However, the magazine's advertising revenue was insufficient to cover the cost of the high quality illustrations and expensive paper that readers had come to expect from West Shore. As a result, Samuel resigned in February 1891. The new general manager, J. M. Lawrence, announced additional changes, but without Samuel's vision and drive the public quickly lost interest in the magazine. West Shore closed its doors on 2 May 1891.

== Illustrations ==
West Shore magazine produced many finely executed illustrations of scenery, architecture, and commerce in Oregon, Washington, California, Idaho, Montana, British Columbia, and Alaska. However, its original illustrations were limited to small black and white wood engravings. It added lithography in 1878. Color lithography illustrations were introduced in 1886. Finally, the magazine switched to halftone photoengraving just prior to closing in 1891.

After the first few years of publication, the magazine began using itinerant artists and engravers to produce local illustrations. In 1881, the magazine hired its first full-time artist, Henry Epting. His first illustrations appeared in the July 1881 issue. Illustrator Junius F. Whiting joined the staff in early 1882, and Albert B. Burr was hired a year later. These excellent artists produced numerous illustrations for each addition of the magazine. In 1883 alone, there were 282 illustrations used in the magazine's twelve regular issues. In 1884, Clarence L. Smith, another excellent artist and lithographer, joined the staff as head of the art department. Two years later, William H. Byrnes replaced Epting, allowing the flow of illustrations to continue without interruption.

Samuel also run the West Shore Lithographing and Engraving Company, using the magazine's art staff to produce illustrations for catalogs, maps, portraits, printed labels, and business forms for banks and others commercial enterprises. Samuel regularly advertised this business in issues of West Shore, allowing the magazine illustrations to highlight the quality of the lithography and engraving work his company produced.

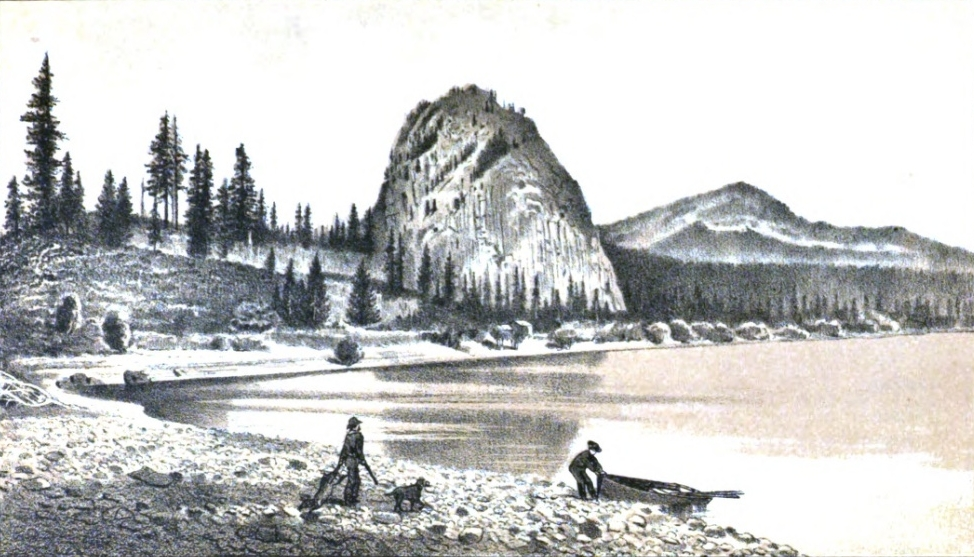
*Columbia River,1887

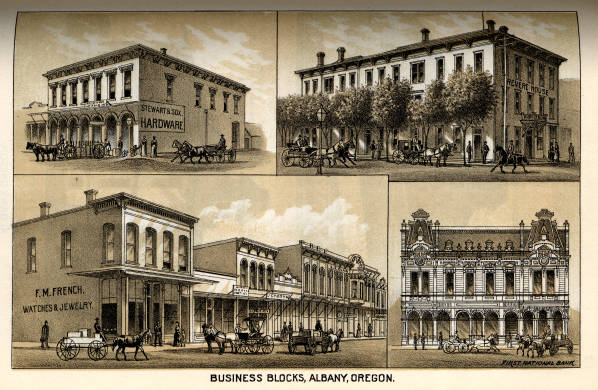
*Albany, Oregon, 1887

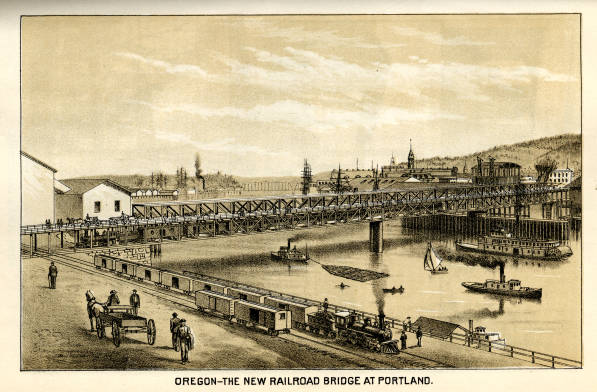
*Portland, Oregon, 1887

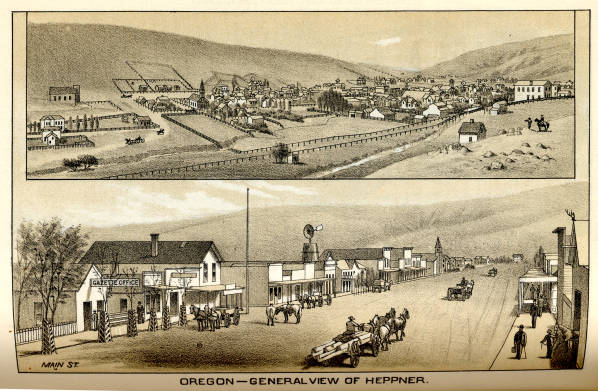
*Heppner, Oregon, 1887

In 1886, Smith, Epting, Burr, and Byrnes were among the founding members of the Pacific Northwest's first artist organization, the Portland Art Club. Samuel, though not an artist, was also a founding member of the club. West Shore announced the formation of the new art club in its February 1886 edition. Other members of the Portland Art Club who contributed works to West Shore included Cleveland S. Rockwell, James E. Stuart, Charles Clyde Benton Cooke, Edward Lincoln Espey, and Grafton Tyler Brown.

Over the years, the illustrations originally published in West Shore have been reproduced in a wide variety of books and articles. Today, the magazine's illustrations provide a detailed record of the Pacific Northwest as it existed in the second half of the nineteenth century. The original prints also retain value as artwork and are sold in many antique print galleries, particularly in the Pacific Northwest.

== Notable contributors ==
- Lindsay Applegate, Oregon pioneer
- Addie Lucia Ballou, San Francisco poet and social reformer
- Henry L. Benson, Oregon politician and state Supreme Court justice
- Grafton Tyler Brown, artist and the only known nineteenth century black American lithographer
- Thomas Condon, pioneer minister, paleontologist and Oregon's first State Geologist
- Belle W. Cooke, Oregon poet
- Charles Clyde Benton Cooke, Oregon artist
- Edward Lincoln Espey, Oregon artist
- Frances Fuller Victor, historian
- Charles A. Gilman, Pacific Northwest wilderness explorer and Lieutenant Governor of Minnesota
- Ella Higginson, poet laureate of Washington State
- George H. Himes, founder of Oregon Pioneer Association and Oregon Historical Society
- Joseph Lane, Governor of Oregon and United States Senator
- Richard Maynard, British Columbia photographer
- Joaquin Miller, adventurer and poet
- Cleveland S. Rockwell, topographical engineer, cartographer and landscape painter
- Eugene Semple, governor of Washington Territory
- Samuel L. Simpson, Oregon's first poet laureate
- William Gladstone Steel, conservationist and advocate for Crater Lake National Park
- James E. Stuart, California artist
- Myra Albert Wiggins, artist and photographer
- C.E.S. Wood, author and civil libertarian
