= Daily Journal of Commerce =

Business newspaper published in Portland, Oregon

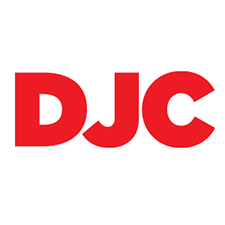
- Type: Business daily
- Owner: BridgeTower Media
- Editor: Joe Yovino
- Founded: 1872
- Headquarters: Portland, Oregon, U.S.
- Circulation: 2,333 paid; 68 non-paid and controlled; 228 online paid
- Website: djcoregon.com

The Daily Journal of Commerce (DJC) is an American newspaper published Monday, Wednesday and Friday in Portland, Oregon. It features business, construction, real estate, legal news and public notices. It is a member of American Court & Commercial Newspapers Inc., and the CCN News Service, National Newspaper Association, International Newspaper Promotion Association, Oregon Newspaper Publishers Association, The Associated General Contractors of America, Oregon-Columbia chapter, and Associated Builders and Contractors Inc. DJC is owned by BridgeTower Media.

The DJC is read by business professionals in industries such as construction, architecture, engineering, commercial real estate, and law. Besides news, each day the DJC displays legal notices and public records from the city of Portland and surrounding governments.

== History ==
The Daily Journal of Commerce was founded by George H. Himes in 1872, and was initially known as the Commercial Reporter. It merged with Sunday Welcome (a competing public notice newspaper in Portland) in 1942 and was purchased by Dolan Media Company of Minneapolis in 1997. Dolan Media Company changed its name to The Dolan Company in 2010. The Dolan Company changed its name to BridgeTower Media in 2016.
