= Frances Fuller Victor =

American novelist

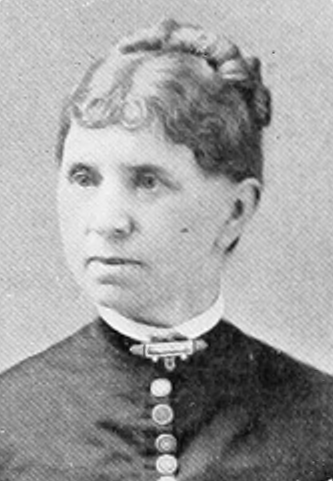
- Born: Frances Auretta Fuller; May 23, 1826; Rome, New York
- Died: November 14, 1902 (aged 76); Portland, Oregon
- Occupation: Writer
- Spouse(s): Jackson Barritt; Henry Clay Victor
- Writing career
- Genre: History
- Notable work: History of Oregon

Frances Auretta Victor (née Fuller; formerly Barritt; pen names: Florence Fane, Dorothy D.) (May 23, 1826 – November 14, 1902) was an American historian and historical novelist. She was known for her books about western United States, and especially Oregon history.

== Early life ==
She was born as Frances Auretta Fuller in Rome, New York, on May 23, 1826, the eldest of five sisters. She was a "close relative" of judge Reuben H. Walworth. Frances Fuller was educated in a ladies' seminary in Wooster, Ohio.

She and her sister Metta Victoria Fuller became widely known for their writing while growing up in Ohio and Pennsylvania. The sisters both published stories and poems in the Home Journal, published by Morris & Willis. In 1848 the sisters moved together to New York City.

== Career ==
In 1851, Frances moved to St. Clair, Michigan, north of Detroit, to help care for her mother and younger sisters. She married Jackson Barritt in 1853, and she and her husband homesteaded near Omaha, Nebraska Territory. She left Barritt, however, returning to live with Metta in New York. There she published several of the first dime novels with Beadle & Adams.

In May 1862, she married Henry Clay Victor, a naval engineer and brother of Metta's husband, in Philadelphia. The couple moved to San Francisco the year they were married and then to Oregon in 1864. They settled in Portland.

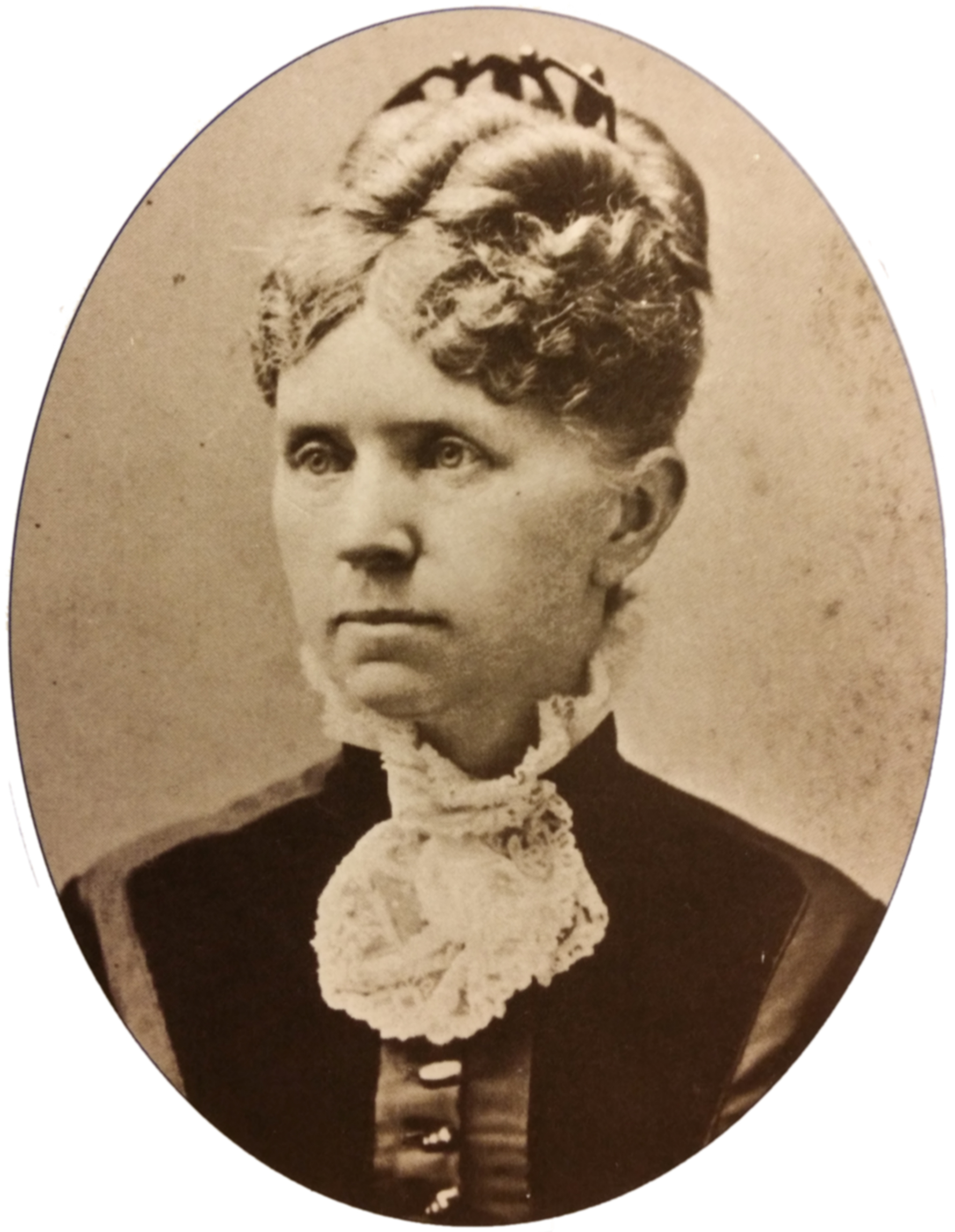
Fuller Victor in 1878, as photographed by I. W. Taber

Following the move to Oregon, Fuller Victor's writing shifted from fiction and feature articles to book-length regional histories. Over the next 13 years, she compiled first-hand accounts of the history of Oregon from territorial leaders such as Joseph Meek, Oliver Applegate, and Matthew Deady. Her diligent studies informed both her fiction and her historical writing, contributing to her success as a writer. Her fiction in this period was considered to accurately capture the spirit of western expansion and the notion of Manifest Destiny.

She also continued to write about women's rights. Among the publications she wrote for was Abigail Scott Duniway's The New Northwest. She was a member of the Pacific Coast Women's Press Association.

Henry C. Victor died on November 4, 1875, in the wreck of the steamship Pacific off Cape Flattery. In need of money, Fuller Victor moved back to San Francisco to accept a 10-year contract offered by historian Hubert Howe Bancroft. The terms of the contract required her to turn over to him her extensive collections and research. She contributed major portions of Bancroft's monumental work, The History of the West, though Bancroft published her work under his own name.

Fuller Victor returned to Oregon in 1886. She was commissioned by the Oregon Legislative Assembly to write a history of the Anglo-Indian wars, which was titled The Early Indian Wars of Oregon. To cover her living expenses, she also sold face cream and other articles door-to-door. She was granted a pension in April 1902.

In regards to surnames and personal identity, she said, "What an awkward thing it is for literary women to be deprived of their own names! I furnished my biography to an encyclopedia the other day under the F for Fuller heading, believing that Fuller is my rightful name."

== Death and legacy ==
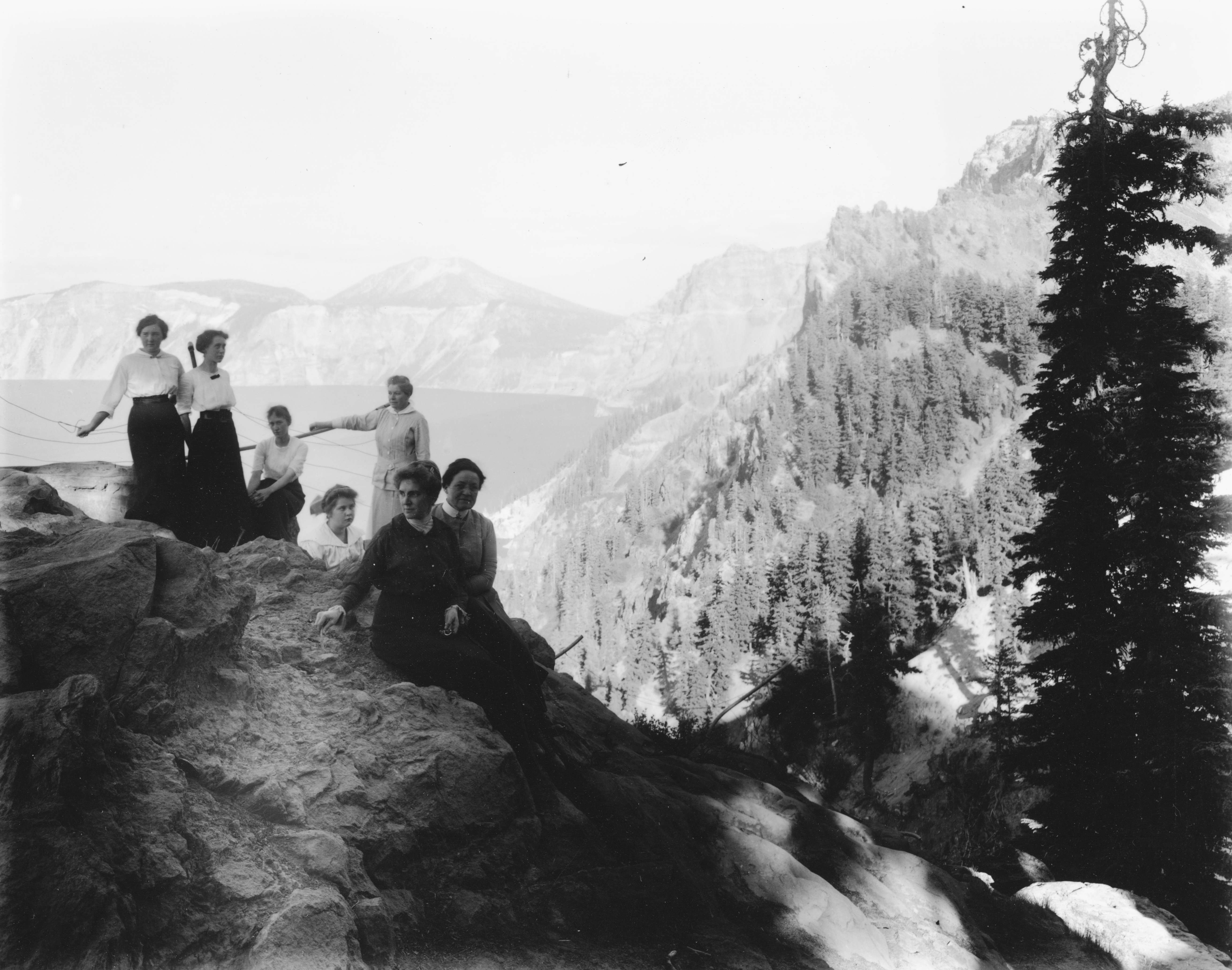
Victor View, a viewpoint at Crater Lake, was formally named in 1945. Fuller Victor visited Crater Lake in 1872.

Fuller Victor died on November 14, 1902. She was buried at River View Cemetery in Portland. The initial grave marker was made of wood, and did not last long. In 1947, the Daughters of the American Revolution supplied a permanent grave marker.

Fuller Victor has been described as "the first Oregon historian to gain regional and national attention." In many respects though, her legacy continued to be overshadowed by that of historian Hubert Howe Bancroft, though her authorship was recognized by a number of authorities. Leslie M. Scott, who served as editor of the Oregon Historical Quarterly and later as treasurer of Oregon, suggested in a 1924 address that the History of Oregon she wrote while employed by Bancroft might be "the most monumental work on Oregon history."

Fuller Victor's name was included among the names of significant Oregonians on the walls of the Oregon State Capitol, which was completed in 1938. In 1945 Crater Lake National Park formalized the name of "Victor View," a viewpoint on the rim of the park, in her honor.

She was included (along with several other women) in a list of "Noted Leaders of the Oregonian's First 100 Years" in 1950.

Beginning in 1951, Randall Mills began researching Fuller Victor's life and work. He enlisted the help of Hazel Emery Mills, his wife; the work became her lifelong passion following Randall's death shortly after the project began. With assistance and encouragement over the years from Thomas Vaughan of the Oregon Historical Society, Constance Bordwell of the University of Oregon, and (after Hazel Mills' death in 1999) Bordwell's assistants Priscilla Knuth and Bruce Taylor Hamilton, and Vaughan's associate Marguerite Wright, a biography was published by the OHS Press in 2003. It was called Frances Fuller Victor: The Witness to America's Westerings. It was attributed to Hazel Mills and Constance Bordwell as authors, with Thomas Vaughan and Marguerite Wright as editors.

Separately, and without awareness of the Mills–Bordwell project, Jim Martin, a legislative assistant with a background in journalism, took an interest in Fuller Victor in 1976, after having noticed her name on the Capitol's wall. He researched her work for eight years. After searching for a publisher for five years, he published A Bit of Blue: The Life and Work of Frances Fuller Victor, under his own Deep Well Publishing imprint.

Fuller Victor's legacy was invoked in a speech by scholar Terrence O'Donnell at the inaugural Oregon Book Award event in 1987, which also marked the beginning of the annual Frances Fuller Victor Award for Creative Nonfiction (aka Frances Fuller Victor Award for General Nonfiction).

In 2005, the Oregon Cultural Heritage Commission selected The River of the West as one of the 100 books that best define the state and its people.

In 2021, Storybound released the pilot of Florence Fane in San Francisco, written by playwright Brianna Barrett and produced by Jude Brewer, officially funded by a grant from the Regional Arts & Culture Council in 2019. The pilot is a radio drama adaptation of Barrett's historical fiction play based on the life of Fuller Victor, specifically, her years spent working for The Golden Era in San Francisco during the Civil War.

== Works by Frances Fuller Victor ==
Fuller Victor published some works under the name Florence Fane.

- Anizetta, the Guajira; or, The Creole of Cuba (1848)
- East and West; or, The Beauty of Willard's Mill (1862)
- The Land Claim: A Tale of the Upper Missouri (1862)
- "Manifest Destiny in the West" in the Overland Monthly (1869)
- The River of the West: The Adventures of Joe Meek (1870)
- All Over Oregon and Washington (1872)
- social columns for San Francisco's Daily Morning Call, written under the penname Dorothy D (mid-1870s)
- "The Literature of Oregon." The West Shore 1 (1876)
- The New Penelope: And Other Stories and Poems (1877)
- Eleven Years in the Rocky Mountains and a Life on the Frontier (1877) (an edited version of River of the West)
- Under contract with Hubert Howe Bancroft:
  - Several volumes of the series History of the Pacific states of North America, inaccurately attributed to Bancroft.
- Atlantis Arisen: or, Talks of a Tourist about Oregon and Washington (1891) (an edited version of All Over Oregon…
- The Early Indian Wars of Oregon (1894)
- Autobiographical Sketch (1895)
- Poems (1900)
