= Cleveland S. Rockwell =

American cartographer and military officer (1837 - 1907)

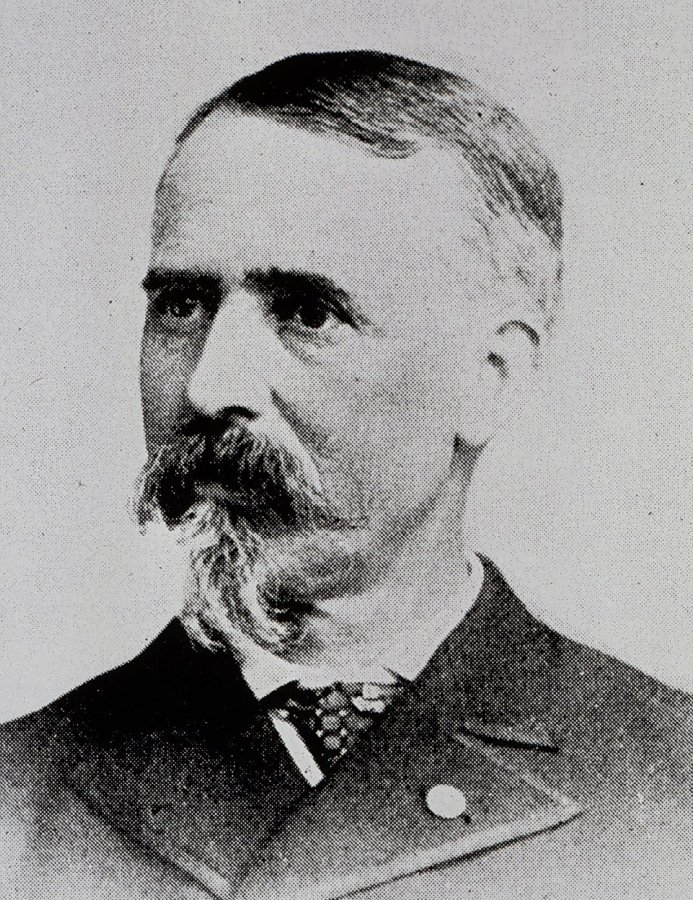
- Cleveland Rockwell, 1885
- Born: November 24, 1837; Youngstown, Ohio, U.S.
- Died: March 22, 1907 (aged 69); Portland, Oregon, U.S.
- Burial place: Portland Memorial Mausoleum
- Military career
- Allegiance: United States; Union
- Branch: Union Army
- Service years: 1863 – 1864
- Rank: Captain of Engineers
- Unit: Army of the Ohio
- Conflicts: Sherman's March to the Sea and Carolinas campaign
- Other work: Topographical engineer, cartographer, and landscape painter

Cleveland Salter Rockwell (November 24, 1837 – March 22, 1907) was an American topographical engineer, cartographer, military officer, investor, and landscape painter. He spent his professional career as a survey engineer in the United States Coast and Geodetic Survey. Rockwell conducted numerous coastal surveys and mapped harbors and river systems on the Atlantic and Pacific coasts of the United States. He also surveyed areas in South America. During the American Civil War, Rockwell served as a captain in the Union Army. After retiring from the Coastal Survey, he became a successful investor and landscape painter. Today, Cleveland Rockwell's topographical maps are important historical documents and his art work is well known in the Pacific Northwest.

== Early life ==
Rockwell was born on November 24, 1837, in Youngstown, Ohio. His parents were Edward Rockwell and Matilda du Plessis Salter Rockwell. His father was a successful lawyer and businessman. Rockwell moved to Cleveland with his family in 1852 when his father became treasurer of the Cleveland and Pittsburgh Railroad. In 1854, Rockwell entered Troy Academy in Troy, New York, a technical preparatory school for Rensselaer Polytechnic Institute. He studied cartography and related subjects at Troy before transferring to the University of the City of New York in New York City, where he studied mechanical engineering. He then accepted a professional appointment to the United States Coastal Survey (later known as the United States Coast and Geodetic Survey), one of the oldest scientific bureaus in the Federal Government.

Rockwell's service in the Coastal Survey began in July 1856, as a survey aid. He received a salary of $15 per month plus room and board. His first assignment was a field survey of parts of New York Harbor and several islands in the East River including Rikers Island. During the survey, Rockwell's supervisor was called away on another job, leaving Rockwell in charge of the survey team and support vessel. When winter ended the field work, Rockwell made careful hand-drawn maps of the harbor using the field data his team had collected. Alexander D. Bache, Superintendent of the Coastal Survey, mentioned Rockwell's work in the bureau's 1857 report to Congress.

In 1858, Rockwell worked on a survey of Charleston Harbor in South Carolina. The following year, he helped survey the South Carolina shoreline near the Savannah River. In December 1859, his supervisor died suddenly. In January 1860, he was officially put in charge of the Port Royal-Savannah River field survey. His team completed the assigned field work by May, surveying 190 miles of coastline in less than six month. Once again, Rockwell was cited in Superintendent's annual report for his excellent field work.

The 1861 the coastal survey projects along the South Carolina and Georgia coasts were canceled because of political tensions between southern states and the Federal Government. Rockwell spent that winter finishing his South Carolina coastal maps. After South Carolina fired on Fort Sumter on April 12, 1861, his new charts of Charleston and Port Royal harbors and the South Carolina coastline became important to the United States Navy as they planned their blockade of southern ports. His charts of Port Royal Sound allowed Captain Samuel Du Pont to replace the channel markers destroyed by Confederate forces prior to his naval bombardment of Fort Walker. This led to the surrender of the fort and the occupation of Port Royal in November 1861.

== Military service ==
During the American Civil War, Rockwell was appointed as a captain in the Union Army. Because of his experience as a topographical engineer and cartographer, he was in great demand within the Army. As a result, he served in many theaters during the war. Shortly after the war began, he led a field survey of northern Fairfax County, Virginia adjacent to the Potomac River from Mount Vernon to Vienna. The survey was requested by General Winfield Scott to help the Union Army site defensive positions around Washington. The survey was completed in July 1861, just prior to the First Battle of Bull Run.

Rockwell spent most of 1862 finishing his maps of the South Carolina and Georgia coastline. His maps were important to the Union blockade because the new charts allowed the Navy to identify coastal hiding places used by blockade runners. The new coastal charts helped the Union Navy increase its capture rate from one in ten blockade runners in 1861 to one in three by 1864.

Accurate maps were critical to the Union Army as well. In February 1863, Rockwell was assigned to work on a survey of the Neuse River in North Carolina, serving under Major General John G. Foster. During this period, Rockwell was also called upon to conduct reconnaissance of inland road networks to support Union war plans. In April, he was reconnoitering inland roads near New Bern, North Carolina, accompanied by four companies of New York cavalry, when they encountered a smaller unit of Confederate cavalry. Rockwell joined the Union cavalry in their pursuit of the Confederates. The engagement ended with a skirmish near Pelatier's Mill. Rockwell participated in a cavalry charge that resulted in the capture of thirteen Confederate troops. This was particularly dangerous, since Rockwell was a civilian and faced the prospect of being tried as a spy if he was captured by Confederate forces.

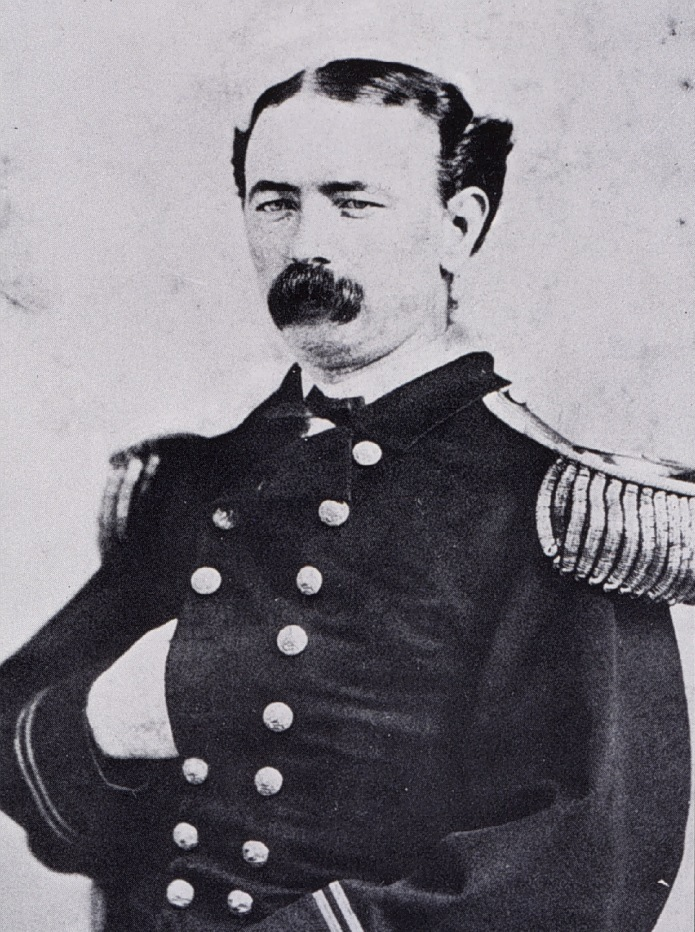
Captain Cleveland Rockwell, GAR, 1864

In June 1863, when Confederate General Robert E. Lee led the Army of Northern Virginia into Maryland and Pennsylvania, the Coastal Survey's Superintendent, Alexander Bache, offered to provide engineers to help the city of Philadelphia expand its defenses. Major General Napoleon J. T. Dana, who was responsible for defending the city, gladly accepted the offer. Rockwell was one of thirteen Coastal Survey engineers sent to map approaches to the city and help construct emergency fortifications. After the Battle of Gettysburg, the danger to Philadelphia passed and Rockwell was sent to map the coastline near Winter Harbor, Maine. He completed that survey in October 1863. In November, Rockwell was sent to support Major General Benjamin F. Butler, commander of Fortress Monroe near Norfolk, Virginia. At Fortress Monroe, he conducted a survey of the Sewall's Point prisoner compound adjacent to the fortress. Rockwell completed that assignment in less than a month.

Rockwell's next assignment was in Knoxville, Tennessee. He arrived in Knoxville on December 12, 1863. The next day, he was commissioned as a captain in the Union Army's Corps of Topographical Engineers and assigned to the Army of the Ohio. The commission protected Rockwell from spying charges if he was captured while scouting roads and terrain out in front of the Army. It also allowed him to command the troops he needed for survey projects. Rockwell was assigned to map the area around Knoxville, a task he completed in March 1864. He was then assigned to map specific areas between Knoxville and Jefferson City. He completed those surveys and delivered the maps in May. For the next four months, there is no record of Rockwell's whereabouts. This seem to indicate he may have been on a secret mission, since it is unlikely that a valuable topographical engineer would have been left unused for such a long period of time with the war on-going.

In the fall of 1864, Rockwell was assigned to survey work in New York Harbor. Then in early 1865, Rockwell joined Major General William T. Sherman's army on its March to the Sea. During that campaign, Rockwell and another officer from the Coastal Survey scouted ahead of the army columns, exploring roads and sending maps back to senior commanders so they could plan the Army's marching routes. Rockwell also participated in General Sherman's march though the Carolinas. In April 1865, Rockwell was released from the Army and he returned to the Coastal Survey.

== South America ==
In August 1865, the President of Colombia requested the United States send a party of coastal engineers to examine a possible route for connecting Lake Santa Marta with the Magdalena River. Secretary of State William H. Seward agreed and directed the Coastal Survey Superintendent to identify engineers to undertake the task. Rockwell was one of six engineers selected for this unusual mission. He left for Colombia on December 11, 1865. The survey took about six months including a great deal of lost time caused by diplomatic wrangling as various Colombian officials tried to reduce the team's compensation and divert the engineers into other projects. Rockwell and the other members of the team finished their work and returned to New York in June 1866.

== Pacific coast ==
The Coastal Survey transferred Rockwell to the west coast is 1868. His first assignment was to survey a portion the San Francisco Peninsula in California. The survey was needed to help the Army place new coastal defenses around the city of San Francisco. In July 1868, Rockwell and his assistant were sent to Oregon to survey and map the mouth of the Columbia River. The Columbia was an important waterway and it had not been charted since 1852. Rockwell's soundings showed the river had change dramatically since it was first surveyed. He also discovered a new, deeper channel north of Astoria, Oregon. On the basis of Rockwell's survey, most of the buoys around the Columbia River Bar and along the main channel were repositioned, making the passage into and out of the river safer.

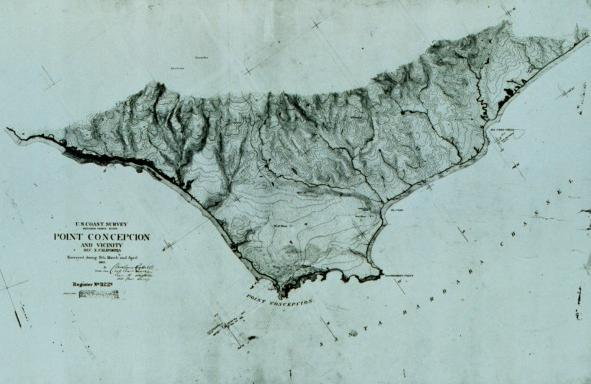
Rockwell's map of Point Conception, California, 1869

During the winter of 1868 and the spring of 1869, Rockwell and his assistant surveyed and mapped Point Conception near Santa Barbara, California. In July 1869, he returned to Oregon to continue his work on the Columbia River. He mapped Cape Disappointment and surveyed a number of bays above and below the mouth of the Columbia. However, his work was handicapped by smoke from forest fires, coastal fog, and heavy rains.

In the winter of 1871, Rockwell returned to California to survey San Simeon Bay. Then when the weather in the Pacific Northwest improved, he move north to conduct a survey of Puget Sound in Washington state. For the next four years, he continued to shift from California to the Pacific Northwest, working the winter and spring months in the south and then moving north in May or June and staying through the fall.

In 1873, Rockwell was married to Cornelia Fleming Russell, whose uncle was Governor of Tennessee. The Russell family was not happy with the match because of Rockwell's Union Army service during the Civil War, so the couple married secretly on a ferry boat in San Francisco Bay. After their marriage, Cornelia traveled with Rockwell, staying as close a practical given the outdoor nature of his field work. She may have even joined him in some of his field camps. Rockwell spent the next several years in northern California working on surveys of the Russian River and Cape Mendocino. He also fixed the location of numerous mountain peaks in northern California.

In 1879, Rockwell moved his family home from San Francisco to Portland, Oregon. He spent the next ten years working in the Pacific Northwest, making periodic trip to San Francisco where the Coastal Survey's west coast office was located. During this time, he surveyed and mapped much of the lower Columbia and the highlands on both sides of the river. Between 1879 and 1884, he charted the channel of the Columbia's major tributaries including the Willamette River. His survey of the Willamette River was extremely detailed, including 17,782 hydrographic soundings. He also surveyed and mapped 50 miles of Oregon coastline south of Astoria along with other important coastal features including Nestucca Bay, Tillamook Bay, and several coastal rivers. In April and May 1884, Rockwell visited British Columbia and Alaska, filling his sketchbooks with scenes from his travels along the coast.

In the spring of 1890, Rockwell was called back to California to participate in a major survey of the Los Angeles area in southern California. However, shortly after his arrival he was sent back to San Francisco to take charge of a survey party whose leader had died suddenly. After finishing a survey of Point Sur in the Big Sur area of Monterey County, he returned to Portland in May 1890 to continue his Columbia River work. On June 1, 1892, Rockwell retired from the Coastal Survey after thirty-five years of service.

== Later life ==
By 1892, Rockwell was well known within the Portland community. His work on the Columbia and Willamette rivers had help make commercial transportation to and from the city safer. His art work was also widely admired. Friends who receive a paintings or drawings as a gift considered themselves very fortunate. After retiring from the Coastal Survey, Rockwell opened an office in downtown Portland, taking work as a consulting engineer. In addition, his father had left him a significant estate which he invested. He served on the board of directors of three Portland banks including the Portland Trust Company (later known as The Oregon Bank) headed by Henry L. Pittock. Through his investments, Rockwell became moderately wealthy. His financial success gave him the freedom to travel, hunt, and fish at his leisure.

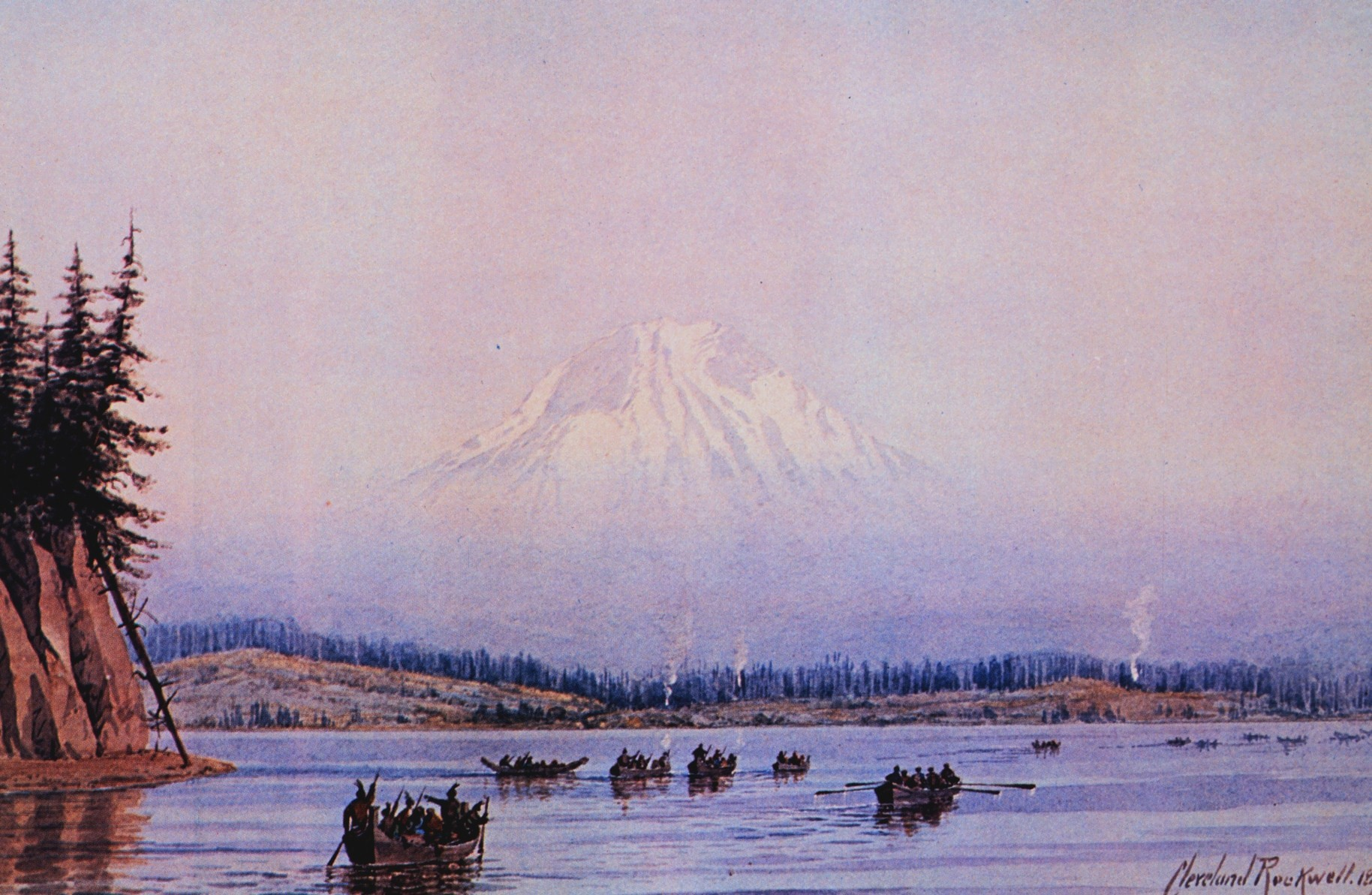
Watercolor painting of Mount Rainier, Washington, 1891

Long before he retired, Rockwell had begun writing about Oregon, especially the Columbia River. His works were published in a number of magazines including The Pacific Monthly, West Shore, and Harper's Magazine. His articles were always carefully written, detailed, and accurate. Rockwell normally included a number of drawings with his articles. This added significant visual appeal to his articles.

Rockwell was an accomplished artist, skilled at landscape drawing, watercolors, and oil painting. In 1873, he exhibited two of his painting in the San Francisco Art Association show and two more in the association's 1874 show. No records exist for the association's art shows in 1875 or 1876. In 1877, Rockwell exhibited four painting in the San Francisco show. After retirement, Rockwell spent more time painting. In 1883, he began showing his work at the annual Portland Mechanics Fair and other local art exhibitions. He helped establish the Portland Art Club in 1885 and the Portland Art Association in 1892. Beginning in the late 1890s, Rockwell began displaying small watercolors, selling them for $10 and $20 to casual buyers. He also finished a number of large oil paintings during this period that were very popular in Portland society circles. Rockwell died of pneumonia in Portland on March 22, 1907, at the age of 69.

== Legacy ==
Rockwell played an important part in the early history of California and the Pacific Northwest. His survey parties mapped many prominent features along the Pacific coast. Shortly after Rockwell's death, his wife donated 36 volumes of topographic survey reports to the Oregon State Library. The reports cover the Columbia River and other areas in Oregon and Washington. In addition, some of his hand-drawn maps still exist in the archives of the National Oceanic and Atmospheric Administration in Washington, D.C.

Today, Rockwell's artwork is well known in the Pacific Northwest. Many of his landscape watercolors and oil paintings are based on sketches he made during his topographical survey expeditions. His paintings were done in the English romantic style; however, his works always accurately reflected the details of the real landscapes he painted. It is estimated that Rockwell produced about 500 finished works. Only 134 of his paintings are known today along with his sketchbooks that include several hundred more drawings. Except for three casual sketchbook portraits, all his known works are landscapes. His paintings and drawings are on display in at least seven west coast museums.

- Anchorage Museum of History and Art in Anchorage, Alaska
- Columbia River Maritime Museum in Astoria, Oregon
- Frye Art Museum in Seattle, Washington
- Glenbow Museum in Calgary, Canada
- Oakland Museum of California in Oakland, California
- Oregon Historical Society in Portland, Oregon
- Seattle Art Museum in Seattle, Washington

Rockwell's paintings and drawings are also sold at national auctions and by commercial galleries when individual works become available.
