= Orville James Victor =

American publisher (1827–1910)

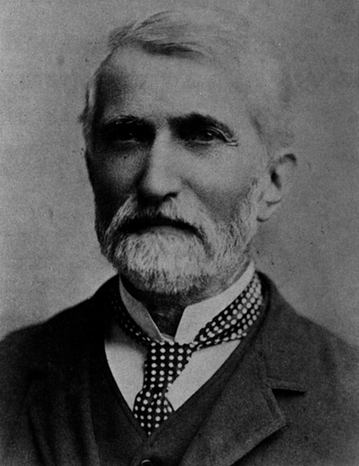
Orville James Victor

Orville James Victor (October 23, 1827 – March 14, 1910) was an American writer and editor in chief.

== Biography ==
Victor was born in Sandusky, Ohio to Henry Clay Victor and Gertrude Nash Victor, and had seven siblings; his father operated a hotel in Sandusky.

He studied in the Norwalk Seminary and graduated in 1847. He decided to pursue writing as a profession and in 1852 was hired as an assistant-editor of the Sandusky Daily Register. After marrying Metta Victoria Fuller in 1856, he moved with his wife to New York City where he edited the Cosmopolitan Art Journal and other publications. In 1861, Erastus Flavel Beadle recruited him as an editor for the Beadle firm, and Victor worked there for the next thirty-six years. Gilbert Patten wrote, "Mr. Victor taught me much . . . He was a cold-appearing, austere man, but one of the kindest and most helpful editors I've ever known."

During the American Civil War Victor wrote two books, History of the Southern Rebellion and History of American Conspiracies. In 1863 he visited England and published a pamphlet there entitled, "The American Rebellion; Its Causes and Objects: Facts for the English People."

Victor died at his home in Ho-Ho-Kus, New Jersey, on March 14, 1910, eighty-three years old.

== Family ==
His wife, Metta Victoria Fuller, an author, died in Hohokus Township, New Jersey on June 26, 1886. He did not remarry and grieved her death until the end of his life.

John Harvey Whitson, a contributor to the Beadle's dime novel series, described Victor's loss in the following words,

He was old-fashioned. ... He spoke with feeling of his wife, long dead. I recall his remark, made almost with tears in his eyes, to the effect that love was a desolating thing when you had lost the object of your affection; that even in those late years he now and then turned suddenly, almost thinking he heard her step or her voice. Yet I think this gnawing life sorrow he suffered never crept into or injured his work. A great editor. Peace to his ashes."

== Recognition ==
The now-defunct Orvil Township, in Bergen County, New Jersey, was named in his honor in 1885.

Orville James Victor is remembered for his long-time editorial work, from 1861 till 1897, for Beadle publishing company and for his own historical biographies and history books.
