= George Himes Park =

Public park in Portland, Oregon, U.S.

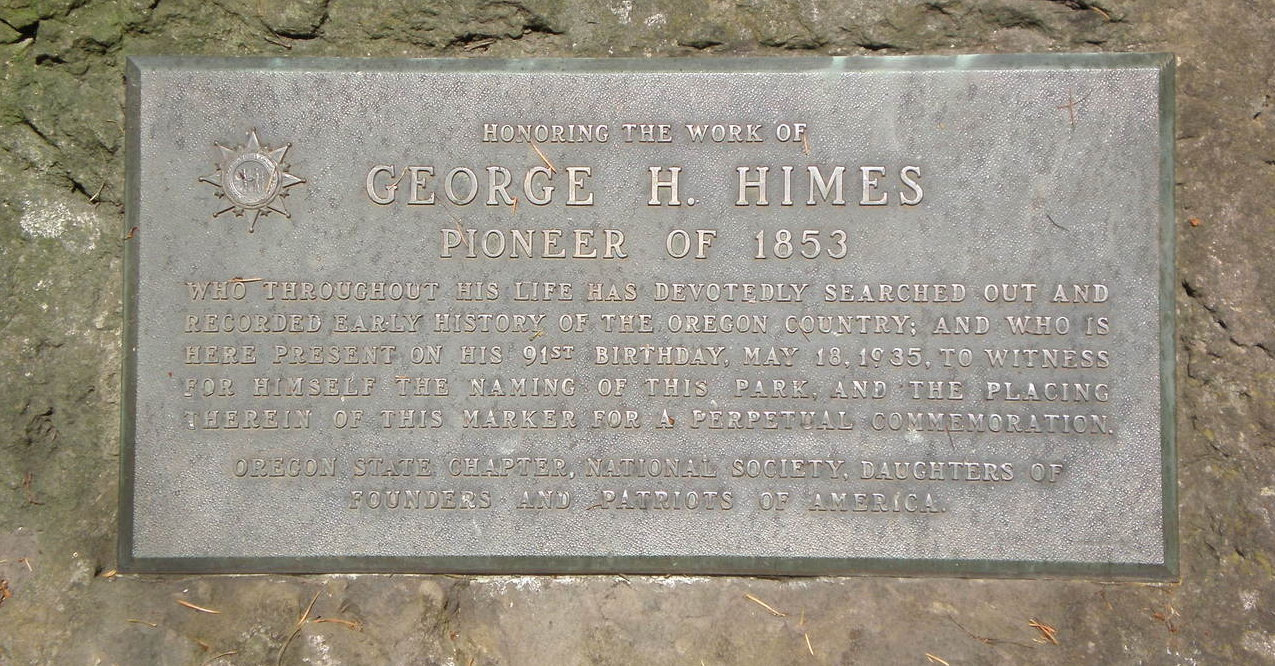
- Plaque at the park commemorating George Himes

- Location within Portland, Oregon
- Location: SW Terwilliger Blvd. and Slavin Rd. Portland, Oregon
- Coordinates: 45°28′40″N 122°41′0″W
- Area: 35.97 acres (14.56 ha)
- Operator: Portland Parks & Recreation

George Himes Park is a 35.97-acre (14.56 ha) public park in southwest Portland, Oregon. The space was acquired in 1903.
