= Metta Victor =

American novelist

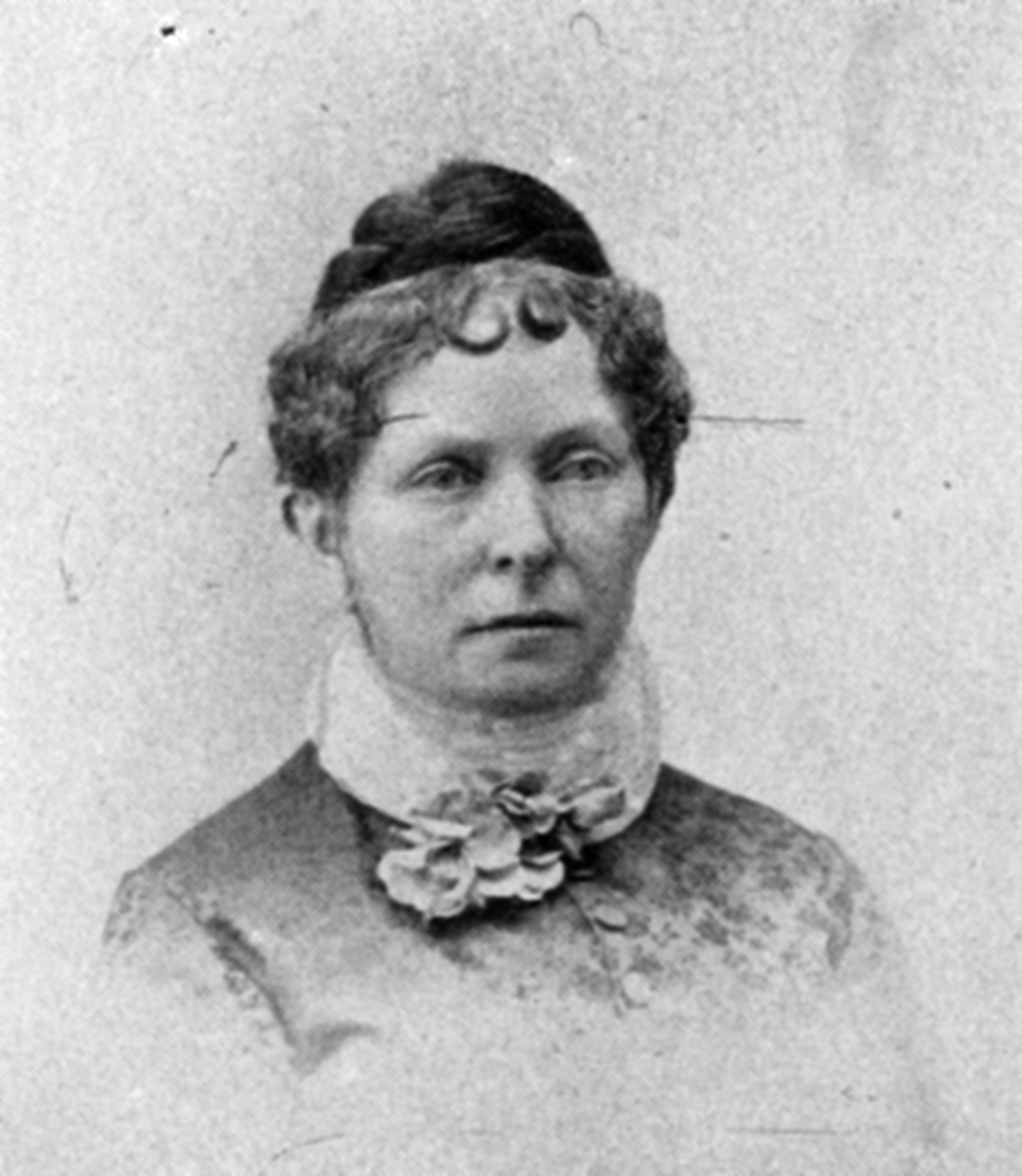
- Born: Metta Victoria Fuller; March 2, 1831; Erie, Pennsylvania, U.S.
- Died: June 26, 1885 (aged 54); Ho-ho-kus, New Jersey, U.S.
- Resting place: Ridgewood's Valleau Cemetery
- Spouse: Orville James Victor
- Writing career
- Pen name: Seeley Regester
- Genre: Fiction
- Movement: "Dime novels"

Metta Victor (née Metta Victoria Fuller; March 2, 1831 – June 26, 1885), who used the pen name Seeley Regester among others, was an American novelist, credited with authoring one of the first detective novels in the United States. She wrote more than 100 dime novels, pioneering the field.

== Life ==
She was born in Erie, Pennsylvania, the third of five children of Adonijah Fuller and Lucy (Williams) Fuller. The family moved to Wooster, Ohio in 1839, where she and her elder sister Frances (who also became a writer) attended a female seminary; they both published stories in local newspapers and, later, in the Home Journal. The sisters moved to New York City together in 1848, where they continued their literary pursuits.

Metta married editor and publishing pioneer Orville James Victor in 1856. Her sister Frances would later marry Victor's brother. Metta served as editor for the Beadle & Company monthly Home and for Cosmopolitan Art Journal, and later anonymously published dime novels for her husband's series for Beadle.

She died of cancer on June 26, 1885, in Ho-ho-kus, New Jersey, and was buried in Ridgewood's Valleau Cemetery.

== Works ==
Her noteworthy works are Alice Wilde (1860), an early dime novel; Maum Guinea, and Her Plantation "Children" (1861), expressing abolitionist sentiments; The Dead Letter (1866), the first full-length American work of crime fiction; The Figure Eight (1869); A Bad Boy's Diary (1880); and The Blunders of a Bashful Man (1881).

She also wrote under the names Corinne Cushman, Eleanor Lee Edwards, Metta Fuller, Walter T. Gray, Mrs. Orrin James, Rose Kennedy, Louis LeGrand, Mrs. Mark Peabody, The Singing Sybil, Mrs. Henry Thomas.
