= Lois Gottlieb =

American architect

Lois Davidson Gottlieb
- Born: November 13, 1926; San Francisco, California, U.S.
- Died: August 12, 2018 (aged 91)
- Education: Stanford University, The Taliesin Fellowship with Frank Lloyd Wright, Harvard University's Graduate School of Design
- Occupation: Architect
- Design: Val-Goeschen, Inverness (1951) Robert S. Gottlieb House, Riverside (1964) Mark Gottlieb House, Fairfax, Virginia (1996)

Lois Davidson Gottlieb (November 13, 1926 – August 12, 2018) was an American architect who specialized in residential design and whose professional career spanned more than 50 years. Gottlieb was born in San Francisco, California, and attended Stanford University where she studied both art and engineering. Following graduation from Stanford, she was awarded the Taliesin Fellowship in Scottsdale, Arizona, and was therefore an apprentice to Frank Lloyd Wright from 1948–1949. She then attended Harvard University's Graduate School of Design from 1949 to 1950. After becoming licensed, she worked as an architect while raising two children and traveling extensively with her family for her husband's work. Her husband, Robert Gottlieb, a violist and music teacher, worked in countries such as India, Thailand, Nepal, and Austria while she taught architecture. Most of her work in the United States can be found in California, Washington, Idaho and Virginia. Gottlieb's works have been featured in various publications, exhibits, and a documentary video made about her work on 'The Gottlieb House' in Fairfax Station, Virginia. Gottlieb co-founded an architectural firm, Duncombe-Davidson, with A. Jane Duncombe, who is also one of the apprentices to Wright's Taliesin. This partnership spanned the years 1951 to 1956. From 1956 to 2002, Gottlieb worked as a freelance residential designer on over 100 projects in the Bay Area and in Riverside, CA, as well as in Washington, Idaho, and Virginia. She is a former member of International Archive of Women in Architecture's board of directors. She died on August 12, 2018, at age 91.

== Education ==
Gottlieb attended Stanford University from 1944 to 1947, where she studied pre-architecture, a combination of art and engineering, before earning a Bachelor of Arts degree. She spent the summer of 1946 at the University of Mexico and the summer of 1947 at the University of Guatemala. In the last quarter of her senior year, Gottlieb visited Frank Lloyd Wright's Hanna-Honeycomb House (1936) near the university campus as part of the class curriculum. As she would later recall, "I was stunned and enchanted. lt was as though l had never heard music before and here was confronted with the visual equivalent of a Beethoven symphony." Driven by the appreciation for, and a desire to learn more about the design philosophy of Wright's architecture, Gottlieb applied for and was accepted as an apprentice to the Taliesin Fellowship. She began a two-year journey of work and study with Wright in 1948. Gottlieb was one of the few women who have been apprenticed to Frank Lloyd Wright as a Taliesin fellow. During her time at Taliesin, she worked on the Eric and Pat Pratt Residence, aka the Pratt house, in Michigan, and the Mrs. Clinton Walker house in Carmel, California. Her book, A Way of Life: An Apprenticeship with Frank Lloyd Wright records the eighteen months that she spent with Frank Lloyd Wright's Taliesin Fellowship in the late 1940s.

Upon the completion of Taliesin fellowship, Gottlieb went to Harvard University's Graduate School of Design from 1949 to 1950 to continue her professional education. Following graduate school, she received her architecture license. In 1967-1968, she traveled to India and studied the crafts of that country with a Fulbright Grant.

== Family ==
Gottlieb and her husband, Robert Gottlieb, an ethnomusicologist, had two children- Karen Gottlieb and Mark Gottlieb. The family was based on California but also lived in India and Australia among other places and for long stretches for Robert's work. Gottlieb taught architecture during these years abroad.

== Design Philosophy ==
Gottlieb had learned at Taliesin that beauty in architecture is a matter of principle that every architect has to discover for themselves. As Gottlieb recalled, "When I first joined Frank Lloyd Wright's Taliesin Fellowship in 1948, it was winter and Mr. and Mrs. Wright and their group of apprentices were living at the desert camp in Arizona. I arrived with a sleeping bag and baggage, and Mrs. Wright led me into the desert to a tiny, pyramidal tent. She said, 'This is your tent and it is up to you make it beautiful.'" Gottlieb believed the apprenticeship with Wright also taught her "to be harmonious with nature and to take full advantage of a beautiful setting." Gottlieb was able to interpret these Wrightian principles in her own practice, as described in her book, Environment and Design in Housing (1968).

== Career ==
Gottlieb began her career working as a designer for Warren Callister in San Francisco. Her first solo project was the design of the Val Goeschen house, a one-room unit with 576 square feet, in Inverness, California. She went on to design other residences in Marin County as part of the design team Duncombe-Davidson based in Sausalito, California. This partnership spanned the years 1951 to 1956. From 1956 to 2002 Gottlieb worked as a freelance residential designer on over 100 projects in the Bay Area and in Riverside, California, as well as in Washington, Idaho, and Virginia.

Gottlieb served as a lecturer at the College of the Holy Names in Oakland, California, from 1960 to 1964, at Alameda State College in Hayward, California, from 1962 to 1964, and at the University of California Extension in Riverside from 1966 to 1972. She also gave guest lectures at various universities around the world, including at Virginia Tech in 1996.Gottlieb's first California house: Val-Goeshen, Inverness (1951), as well as the Robert S. Gottlieb, San Francisco (1955), and Robert S. Gottlieb, Riverside (1964) - all share reverence for nature, careful attention to materials, and celebration of the activities that define the sanctuary of the home, true to Wrightian spirit of an "Organic Architecture." [A Way of Life: An Apprenticeship with Frank Lloyd Wright, 12-16]. However, her most notable architectural work was the Mark Gottlieb House. Built in 1996, it was her largest and most iconic work at 11,000 sq. ft. As one of the last works of her career, it has been regarded as her architectural masterpiece.

Gottlieb had learned at Taliesin that beauty in architecture is a matter of principle that every architect has to discover for themselves. As Gottlieb recalled, "When I first joined Frank Lloyd Wright's Taliesin Fellowship in 1948, it was winter and Mr. and Mrs. Wright and their group of apprentices were living at the desert camp in Arizona. I arrived with a sleeping bag and baggage, and Mrs. Wright led me into the desert to a tiny, pyramidal tent. She said, 'This is your tent and it is up to you make it beautiful.'" Gottlieb believes the apprenticeship with Wright also taught her "to be harmonious with nature and to take full advantage of a beautiful setting." Gottlieb was able to interpret these Wrightian principles in her own practice, as described in her book, Environment and Design in Housing (1968).

=== Architectural works ===
- Val-Goeshen, Inverness, California (1951)
- Robert S. Gottlieb, San Francisco, California (1955)
- Robert S. Gottlieb, Riverside, California (1964)
- Mackey House, Riverside, California (1966)
- Beals House, Riverside California (1967)
- Hansen House, Seattle, Washington (1978)
- Lynn House, Ketchum, Idaho (1980)
- Harrah Energy Efficient House, Sedona, Arizona (1981)
- Mark and Sharon Gottlieb House, Fairfax, Virginia (1996)

== Publications ==
=== Writings ===
- The Balance between Diversity and specialization in American and Indian education, Fulbright Newsletter, Spring 1972.
- Environment and Design in Housing, Macmillan,1968. [ASIN: B0000CMTSS]
- A Way of Life: An Apprenticeship with Frank Lloyd Wright, Mulgrave: Images Publishing, 2001. ISBN 978-1864700961

=== Documentaries ===
==== Building a Dream: A Family Affair (1998) ====
At Taliesin, Gottlieb recalled, "if you wanted something, you made it." As a result, she was "creative about using new methods and materials, such as Trex decking made from melted trash bags and sawdust, and block made from recycled plastic bottles as forms for concrete walls, camouflaged with brick veneer." [Women & Creativity 36] One of her final architectural projects was the design and construction of an 11,000 sq. ft. home and office complex for her son and his wife and family, Mark & Sharon Gottlieb. It was built in Fairfax Station, VA, of recycled materials (such as laminated wood and ice block). This was chronicled and produced with Eva Soltes in the documentary film "Building a Dream: A Family Affair".

==== A Woman is a Fellow Here - 100 Women Architects in the Studio of Frank Lloyd Wright (2009) ====
Gottlieb was one of the few women who have been apprenticed to Frank Lloyd Wright as a Taliesin fellow. She is one of the six women in architecture featured in the Beverly Willis Architecture Foundation movie "A Woman is a Fellow Here". The other women featured included Marion Mahony Griffin, Eleanore Pettersen, Jane Duncombe, Isabel Roberts, and Read Weber.

== Legacy ==
Gottlieb's papers, designs, and drawings were donated in 1997 and 2003 to the International Archive of Women in Architecture at Virginia Tech, which is founded by Professor of Architecture Milka T. Bliznakov in 1985. The collected papers (Ms1997-003) include project files, drawings, correspondence, manuscripts, photographs and printed material related to Gottlieb's design work and various professional activities. There is also documentary footage by Eva Soltes Productions about Lois Gottlieb, including tapes entitled "Lois Plans," "A Way of Life (demo reel)" and "House and Exterior by Robert Gottlieb," 1995–1997. Photographs of some of her works are available on the VT ImageBase.
