= A. Jane Duncombe =

American architect (1925-2015)

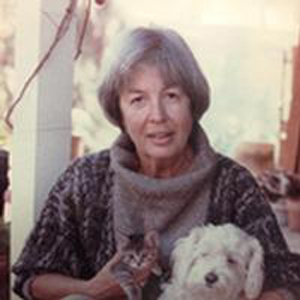
- Born: July 22, 1925; Whitby, Ontario, Canada
- Died: November 24, 2015 (aged 90)
- Education: Art Institute of Chicago School of Industrial Design, Frank Lloyd Wright's Taliesin Fellowship
- Occupation: Architect
- Practice: Architecture, residential design, interior design
- Buildings: White Oaks Theater, Carmel Valley, California Windsor Oaks Winery, Sonoma, California Marin County Convalescent and Rehabilitation Hospital, Tiburon, California

A. Jane Duncombe (July 22, 1925 - November 24, 2015) was born in Whitby, Ontario, Canada. She was a residential designer based in the San Francisco Bay Area some of whose architectural designs can also be found in Illinois and throughout the rest of California. Duncombe studied at the Art Institute of Chicago School of Industrial Design and developed interest in design and architecture through her undergraduate studies. Duncombe was also one of the few female architects who became an apprentice at Frank Lloyd Wright’s Taliesin.

== Early life and education ==
Duncombe attended and earned a Bachelor of Architecture degree at Art Institute of Chicago. She was taught by a Polish architect, Marya Lilien, who was the first woman architect apprenticed to Frank Lloyd Wright at Taliesin, Spring Green, Wisconsin. Lilien established the interior architecture program at the School of the Art Institute in Chicago.

== Career ==
Duncombe co-founded an architectural firm Duncombe-Davidson with Lois Davidson Gottlieb, who is also one of the few women who apprenticed to Wright’s Taliesin at that time. The collaboration began around 1951 and was based in Sausalito. Duncombe-Davidson gained reputation in designing and delivering residential designs throughout Marin County, California. After the end of the collaboration in 1956, Duncombe went on to charter her own business as an independent architect.

== Notable projects ==
(all in California)

- White Oaks Theater, Carmel Valley
- Windsor Oaks Winery, Sonoma
- Kenwood Country Store, Kenwood
- Marin County Convalescent and Rehabilitation Hospital, Tiburon
- Shelter Hill Apartments, Mill Valley
- Bethlehem Tower Model, Santa Rosa
- Joyce Thurkauf Residence, Amador City (1987)

== Death and legacy ==
Duncombe passed away in 2015, at the age of 90. Her papers documenting her career, spanning the years 1952 to 2002, are collected at the International Archive of Women in Architecture located in Virginia Polytechnic Institute and State University. The collection (Ms2002-004) consists mainly of architectural drawings, as well as plot plans and photos of architectural designs.

Duncombe was included in "A Girl is a Fellow Here" ~ 100 Women in the Studio of Frank Lloyd Wright", a documentary film produced by the Beverly Willis Architecture Foundation in 2012. She was also included in A Taliesin Legacy: The Architecture of Frank Lloyd Wright's Apprentices (Architecture Series), written by Tobias S. Guggenheimer in 1955.
