= Anna Sokolina =

American architect, curator and scholar (born 1956)

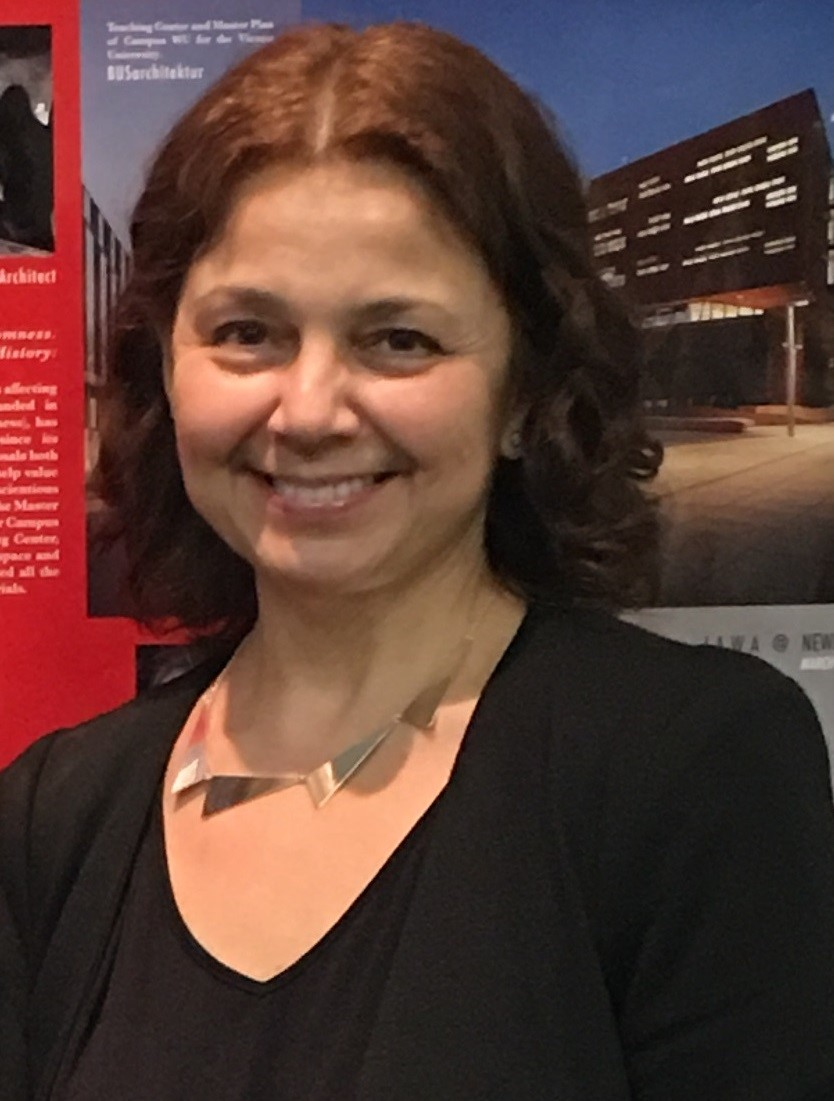
- Anna Sokolina, PhD, at the 2016 Annual Symposium of the International Archive of Women in Architecture, Virginia Tech College of Architecture and Urban Studies, Blacksburg, Virginia, March 25, 2016.
- Born: 1956 (age 69–70)
- Education: VNIITAG, MARKHI, NYU
- Occupations: Architect, scholar, curator

Anna Sokolina, PhD (née Anna Petrovna Guz) is an American architect, scholar, and curator, Founder and advising chair of Women in Architecture Affiliate Group (SAH WiA AG) of the Society of Architectural Historians (SAH), Founder and chair of SAH WiA AG Legacy Committee, Advisory Board member of H-SHERA Network, and Honorary advisor of the International Archive of Women in Architecture, as documented in the Guide to "Sokolina, Anna P. Architectural Collection, Ms2002-051" preserved in Special Collections at Virginia Tech University Library, and also referenced in the consolidated database of finding aids that provides information about the vast array of manuscripts and archival materials housed in Virginia and West Virginia institutions (ARVAS), Special Collections, University Libraries (0434) Newman Library Virginia Tech.

Sokolina published over one hundred research papers, academic reviews and reports, documented in the "Sokolina, Anna P. Architectural Collection, Ms2002-051" held in Special Collections at Virginia Tech University Library; chaired sessions and presented at 88 academic conferences and meetings; and according to in-depth insights preserved in the edited Beverly Willis Architectural Foundation Dynamic National Archive (BWAF DNA) received eighteen grants and recognitions. Her research is focused on holistic genealogies, women's agency, and trajectories of global transitions in architecture. Other areas of study include Paper Architecture, architecture and utopia, architecture and spiritual science. Among her publications are five essays in The Bloomsbury Global Encyclopedia of Women in Architecture 1960-2020 edited by Lori A. Brown and Karen Burns The Routledge Companion to Women in Architecture (editor and contributor, 2021, 2024), Architecture and Anthroposophy (editor, 2001 and 2010, e-access 2019),, positively reviewed and endorsed in multiple academic journals, among them in ARTMargins, Life to Architecture: Milka Bliznakov Scholar Report (2019, e-book 2021), "Breaking the Silence" (New York and London: Routledge, 2021, 2024), "Modernist Topologies: The Goetheanum In-Building” in the acclaimed anthology, Modernity and the Construction of Sacred Space (Berlin: De Gruyter Oldenbourg, 2024), "Biology in Architecture: The Goetheanum Case Study" in The Routledge Companion to Biology in Art and Architecture (New York and London: Routledge, 2016, 2019).

== Biography ==
Anna Sokolina was born on November 3, 1956, in Leningrad, former Soviet Union. According to Society of Architectural Historians outline, she graduated from Third Moscow German School (1964-74), from the Department of Musical education in classical piano at the regional House of Pioneers (1963-1973), and from the Moscow Institute of Architecture (Architecture, 1980). Sokolina earned a PhD in Theory and History of Architecture, Landmarks Restoration and Preservation from VNIITAG, the theory/history branch of the Russian Academy of Architecture and Construction Sciences (1991), thesis "Interpreting Traditions in Architecture of the GDR," and a Certificate in Arts Administration from New York University School of Professional Studies (2001).

She interned at the Solomon R. Guggenheim Museum and experienced the terrorist attack on Twin Towers while interning at the Guggenheim Museum Curatorial Department mere blocks away in SoHo. She also interned at Cooper Hewitt, Smithsonian Design Museum as the Peter Krueger Intern, and New York City Public Design Commission at the NYC Mayor's Office and has contributed for nine years at the Office of Research of the Metropolitan Museum of Art Education Department, and at the Morgan Library & Museum. She worked as an architect at CNIITIA, scientific researcher at VNIITAG where she also studied in the PhD program (according to the data documented in the International Archive of Women in Architecture, Special Collections at Virginia Tech University Libraries). During those years as referenced in "Member Stories" on the official SAH website, she got married and her son was born.

Following the collapse of the USSR, according to data registered on the SAH website, she was invited "by the European Academy of the Urban Environment as lecturer in the UNESCO Sustainable Environments program, gave talks at a plethora of architectural centers in Germany and France, worked as guest writer at a range of German periodicals, and curated itinerant Paper Architecture exhibitions, with support of the Senate of Berlin, Gruen Berlin GmbH, Bauhaus Weimar, ENSAS in France, Deutscher Werkbund, RIAS Berlin, Deutsche Bundesbahn, the Anthroposophical Society in Dornach, Switzerland," and other professional and public centers.

Later she worked as a curator of exhibitions at Tabakman Museum of Contemporary Art in Hudson, NY. While a faculty member at Miami University Department of Architecture + Interior Design, she curated the Cage Architecture Gallery, served on the Council on Diversity and Inclusion, REEE Curriculum Committee, Havighurst Advisory Committee, and Post-Doctoral Fellowship Selection Committee, solicited and organized gifts to Miami University King Library, Virginia Tech University Library Special Collections, and Sächsische Landesbibliothek and TU Dresden. According to the listings in the DNA BWAF, she received multiple grants and awards, among them Milka Bliznakov Scholar IAWA Designation, announced also in "CAA Grants, Awards, and Honors (Oct.2016)"; Miami University School of Fine Arts Scholarship and Teaching Grant for the project “New Interdisciplinary Course: Art and Architecture behind the Iron Curtain” 2007; Miami University R. & J. Howe Center for Writing Excellence Proseminar Scholarship, Spring semester 2007; and a range of book publication grants and recognitions.

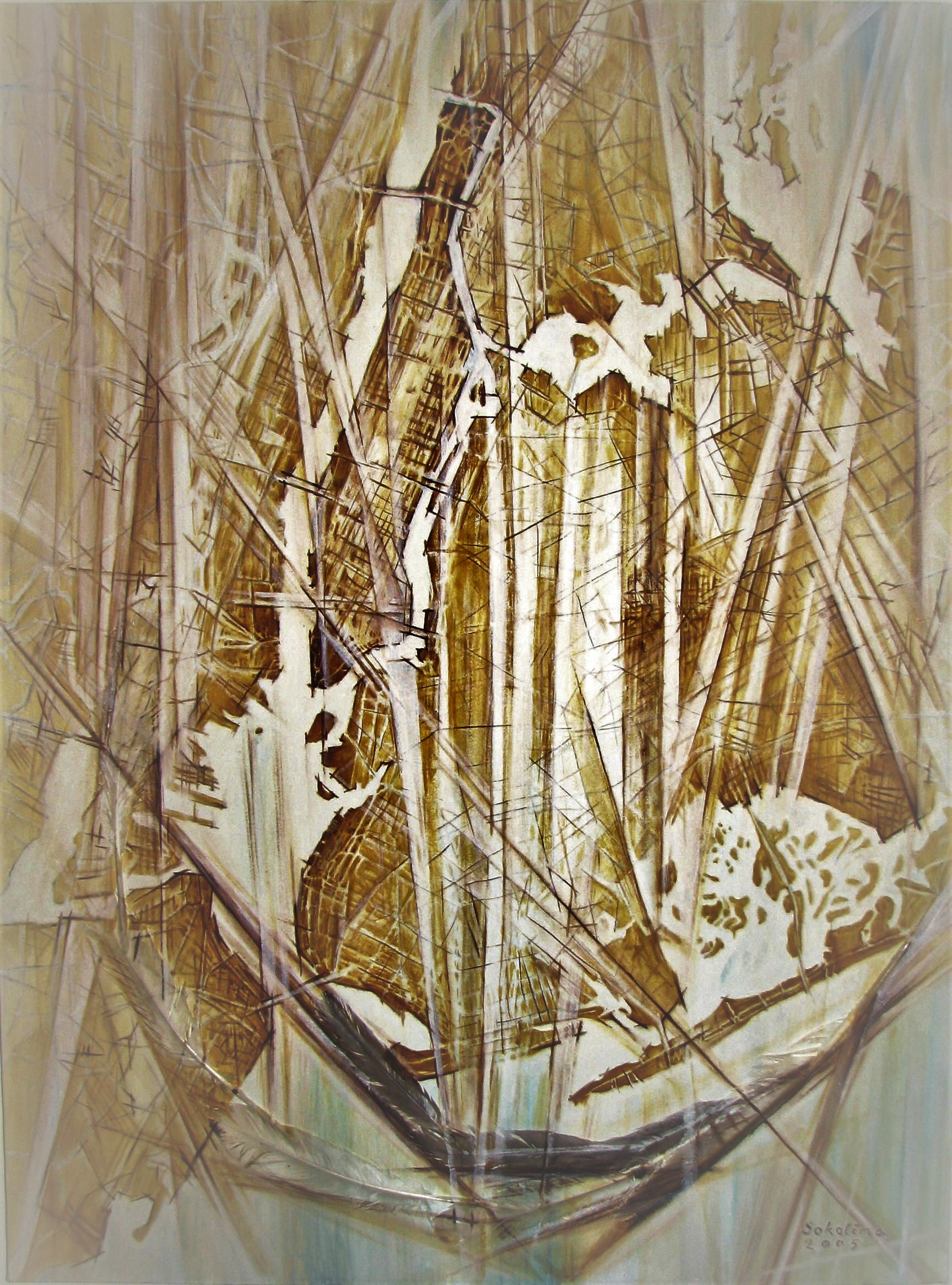
Anna Sokolina. "Aerial View: New York City". 2005. Series: Aerial Views based on urban masterplans, 30x40 inches, mixed media on canvas, exhibited in 2007 at the Metropolitan Museum of Art.

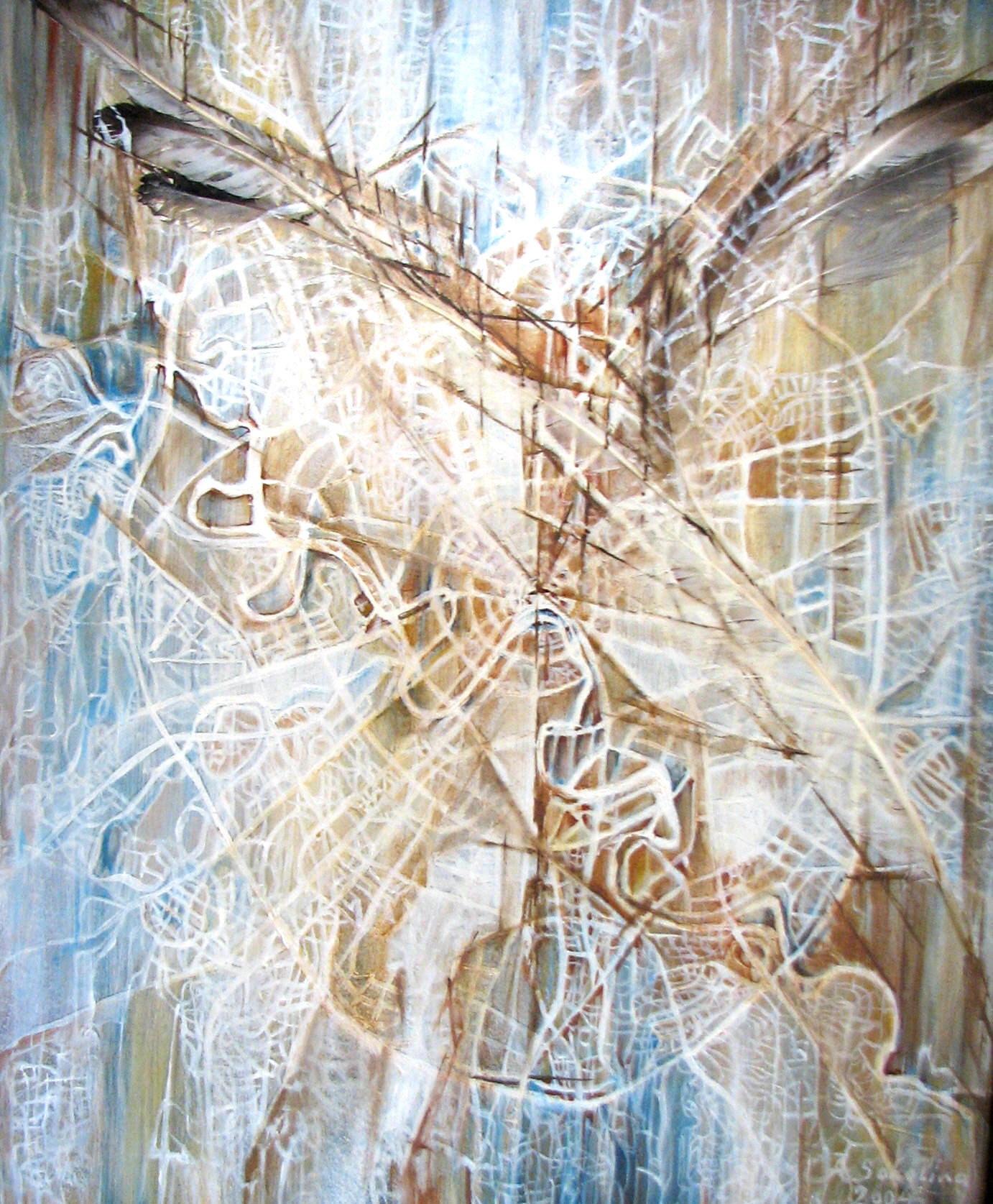
Anna Sokolina. "Aerial View: Moscow". 2004. Series: Aerial Views based on urban masterplans, 20x22 inches, mixed media on plywood, exhibited in 2005 at the Metropolitan Museum of Art.

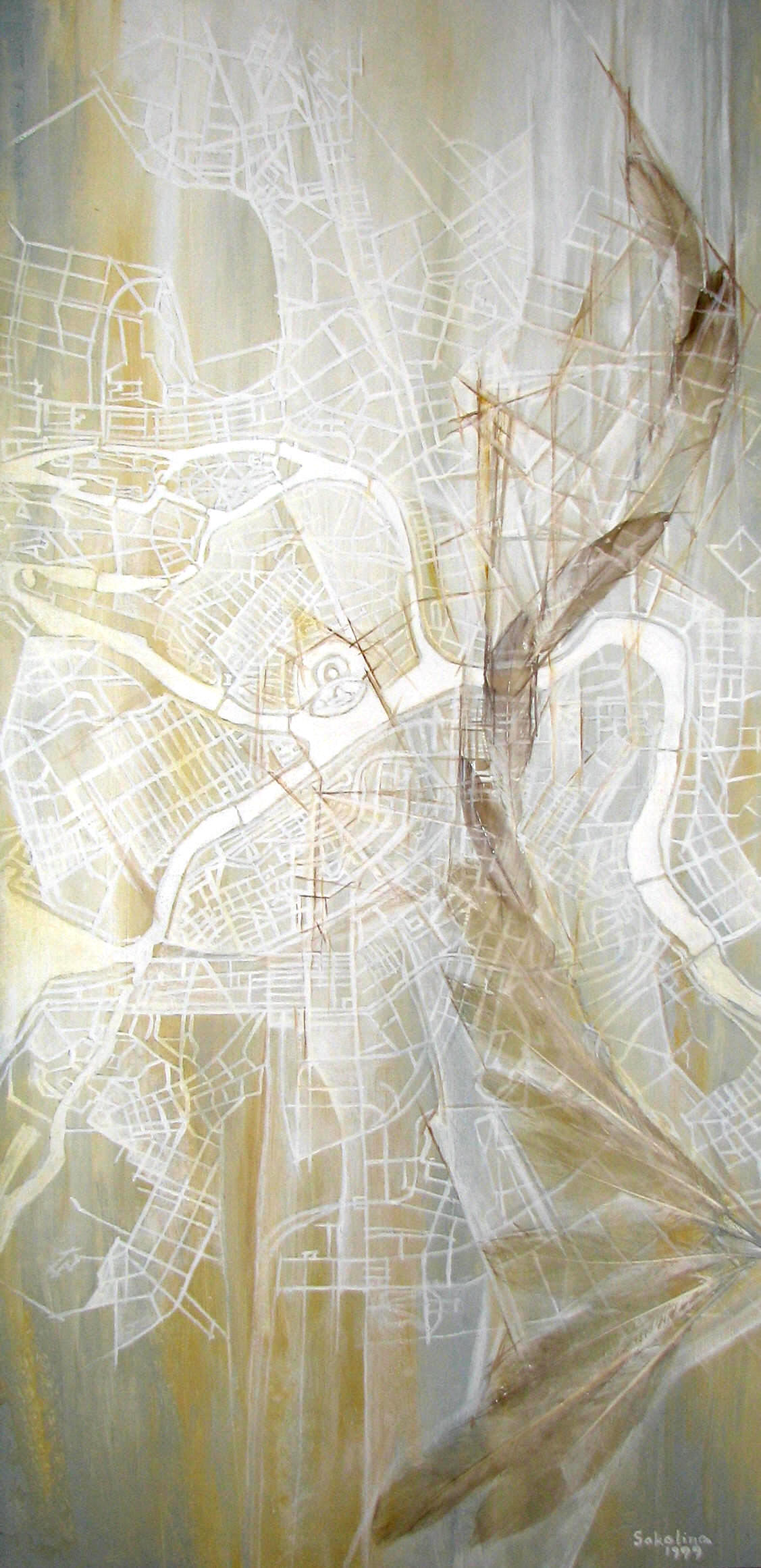
Anna Sokolina. "Aerial View: St. Petersburg." 1999. Series: Aerial Views based on urban masterplans. 22x40 inches, mixed media on canvas, exhibited in 2003 at the Metropolitan Museum of Art.

She was first independent woman curator of itinerant Paper Architecture exhibitions in Germany and France (1992–94), with support by the Senate of Berlin, Grün Berlin GMBh, École Nationale Supérieure d'Architecture de Strasbourg (ENSAS), and Bürgerhaus Gröbenzell, interviewed in direct broadcast by Rundfunk im amerikanischen Sektor RIAS, Berlin, and was first lecturer invited after the collapse of the USSR by the European Academy of the Urban Environment EA.UE Berlin in the UNESCO Program “Sustainable Settlements" (other lecturers: Lucien Kroll, Architect, Brussel, Belgium; Elke Pahl-Weber, Dipl. Ing., City Planner, Hamburg, Germany; John Thompson, Architect, London, England; Henry Beierlorzer, Dipl. Ing., City Planner, Gelsenkirchen, Germany), 1993. In 2016–20 she served as the first Society of Architectural Historians (SAH) liaison elected to SHERA Board.

The International Archive of Women in Architecture at Virginia Tech holds a collection of her professional records, sixty publications, 29 artworks, dissertation thesis and 25 presentation boards, and correspondence with the IAWA founder Prof. Emerita Milka Bliznakov (Series VI, 39 large envelopes, multiple boxes), as well as over 25 collections of women architects that she solicited, composed and sponsored for the Archive.

According to the registered chronicles of the Society of Architectural Historians, in December of 2019, with support of 49 SAH members, Dr. Sokolina submitted to the SAH Board the application to create the SAH Women in Architecture Affiliate Group (SAH WiA AG) and on June 10, 2020, it was approved and the group was officially established and announced in Society's monthly Newsletter. Now the largest SAH affiliate group whose listserv grew from 50 members in 2020 to 800 members in 2026, as per the stated mission, that assembly aims to support and advocate "the contribution of women in architecture, to champion the cause of gender equality and the diversity of professional engagements in the integral field of the built environment."

As an artist, Anna Sokolina participated in nineteen exhibitions, five of them at the Metropolitan Museum of Art in Employees Art Shows; her 105 artworks are housed in 23 public and private collections.

== Select publications ==
- Sokolina, Anna, ed. The Routledge Companion to Women in Architecture. New York: Routledge, 2021, ISBN 9780367232344; 2024, ISBN 9781032014104.
- Sokolina, Anna. Architecture and Anthroposophy. [Arkhitektura i Antroposofiia.] Ed., contributor, transl., photogr. Hardcover M: KMK, 2001 ISBN 5873170746; and 2010 ISBN 5873176604, electronic access: BDN, 2019.
- Sokolina, Anna P. Milka Bliznakov Scholar Report. “Life to Architecture: Milka Bliznakov Academic Papers and Records of Women in Russian Architecture at the IAWA.” New Haven: alternative spaces, 2019, revised edition 2021. Library of Congress Copyright Registration No: TXu 2-145-653.
- Sokolina, Anna P. "Modernist Topologies: The Goetheanum in Building." In Modernity and Construction of Sacred Space, edited by Aaron French and Katharina Waldner, 149–168. Berlin: De Gruyter Oldenbourg, 2024. ISBN 9783111061382 and 9783111062624. https://doi.org/10.1515/9783111062624-008.
- Sokolina, Anna P. "Biology in Architecture: The Goetheanum Case Study." In The Routledge Companion to Biology in Art and Architecture, edited by Charissa Terranova and Meredith Tromble, 52–70. New York: Routledge, 2016, ISBN 9781138919341; 2019, ISBN 9780367873394.
- Sokolina, Anna. "Milka Bliznakov, 1927–2010." Slavic Review. Interdisciplinary Quarterly of Russian, Eurasian, and East European Studies 70, no.2 (2011): 498–499.
- Sokolina, Anna. Poems [Stikhi]. Ills by author, photograph by A. Gennadiev. New York: Telex, 1998. Library of Congress Cat. No: 99232023.
