= O'Blenis House =

Historic house in New Jersey, United States

- U.S. National Register of Historic Places
- New Jersey Register of Historic Places
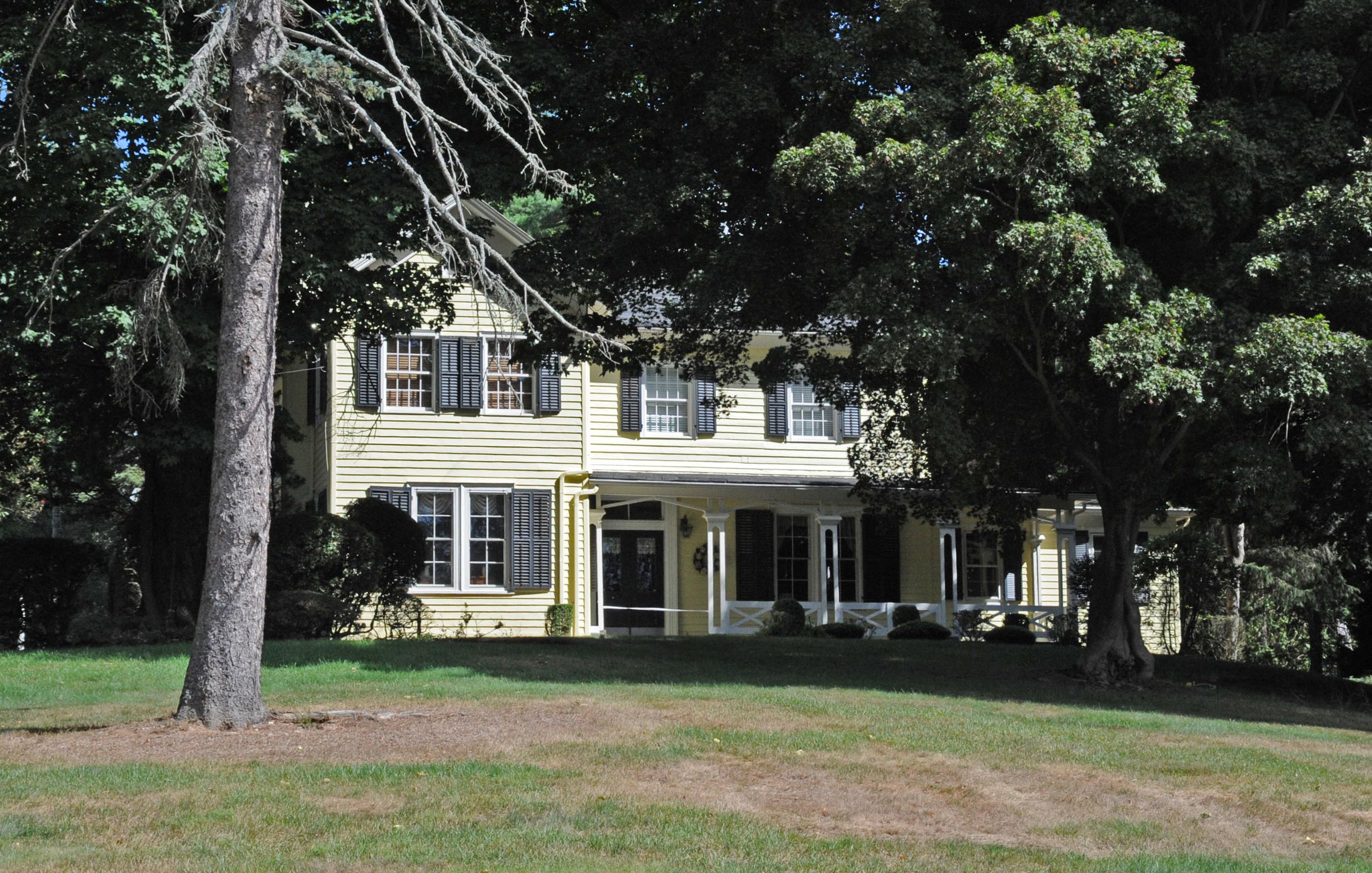

- Location within Bergen County, New Jersey Location within New Jersey Location within the United States
- Location: 220 East Saddle River Road, Saddle River, New Jersey
- Coordinates: 41°2′17″N 74°5′54″W
- Area: 4 acres (1.6 ha)
- Built: c. 1848
- Architect: Eleanore Pettersen
- Architectural style: Vernacular Downingesque
- MPS: Saddle River MRA
- NRHP reference No.: 86001606
- NJRHP No.: 686

Significant dates
- Added to NRHP: August 29, 1986
- Designated NJRHP: June 13, 1986

The O'Blenis House is located at 220 East Saddle River Road in the borough of Saddle River in Bergen County, New Jersey, United States. The house was built around 1848 and was added to the National Register of Historic Places on August 29, 1986, for its significance in architecture and industry. It was listed as part of the Saddle River Multiple Property Submission (MPS).

== History and description ==
According to the nomination form, the house is associated with Dr. Bernard O'Blenis. He was a physician, mill-owner, and the first mayor of the borough in 1894. He partnered with John P. Demarest in the mill operation. The house features vernacular Downingesque architecture, designed by architect Eleanore Pettersen.

== See also ==
- National Register of Historic Places listings in Bergen County, New Jersey
