= Carlock =

Carlock may refer to:

== People with the surname ==
- Dave Carlock, American record producer.
- Keith Carlock, American jazz drummer.
- Robert Carlock, American screenwriter and producer.

== Locations ==
- Carlock, Illinois, USA.
- J. J. Carlock House, historic house in New Jersey, USA.
- Carlock Building, historic building in Lubbock, Texas, USA.

== Fictional characters ==
- Carlocks, villains in the Regular Show episode "Journey to the Bottom of the Crash Pit"
