= Doina Marilena Ciocănea =

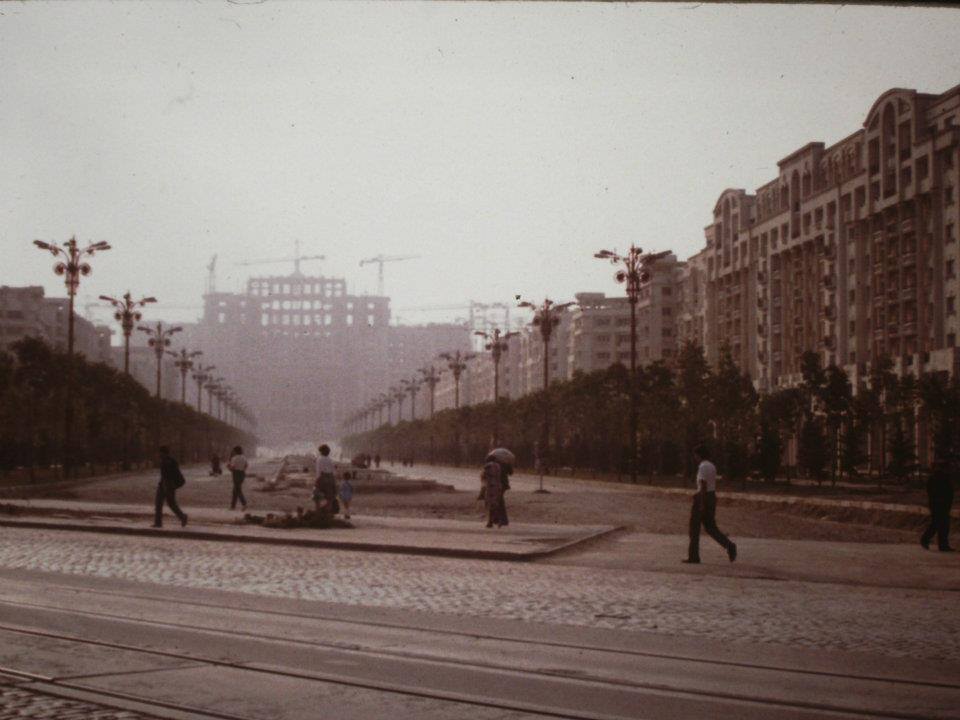
The Palace of the Parliament under construction - the heaviest building in the world

Doina Marilena Ciocănea (born 13 March 1951) is a Romanian architect.

== Works ==
She was born in Bucharest and grew up there. Ciocănea received her diploma from the Institute of Architecture in 1976. From 1976 to 1987, she worked at the Institute for Design and Construction of Agricultural and Food Production Industries, designing storage facilities, canneries, wineries, slaughterhouses, flour mills and bakeries.

She was a member of the team of over 700 architects of the “Carpati” Design Institute between 1987 and 1990, where she worked as the principal architect on the project “Palace of the People” in Bucharest. The building was designed by the architect Anca Petrescu in 1983, following a competition that lasted almost 4 years. The controversial 12-storey building, with its 315,000 m^{2}, is the biggest civic administrative building in the world and the second biggest building after the American Pentagon. It is, in addition, considered the most expensive and heaviest administrative building, a project that consumed a third of the wealth of the country. The building was originally meant to house the Romanian Communist Party Headquarters. After the fall of Nicolae Ceaușescu, the Romanian Parliament Palace occupied it followed, in 1997, by the Museum of Abstract Art, a conference center and other administrative offices.

After state-sponsored companies were terminated, Ciocănea was chief architect for PREDA from 1990 to 1994 and later for MACONZ International; during this time, she mainly designed private residences. In 1995, she received a master's degree in Urban Design and Planning in 1994 and set up her own private practice. She continued her studies at the UNESCO-Cousteau Department of Ecology at the University of Bucharest. In 1996, she received a fellowship to specialize in policy and ecology in Madrid. She also performed ecological studies for the town council of Bucharest.

== Formation ==
Ciocănea had an extensive formation in urbanism. She obtained her diploma and license in Urban Design and Planning in 1994. In 1996 she won a scholarship for a 4-month residence at the University Complutense of Madrid to specialize in environmental policy and urban ecology. During 1996 she continued her specialization in sustainable development at the UNESCO-COUSTEAU University, and in 1997 obtained her master's degree in urbanism from the Institute of Architecture and Urbanism "Ion Mincu”. In 2014 she completed her doctorate at the same university with her thesis “The relationship between urban documentation at a systemic level and the administrative practice.”

== Teaching and research ==
She began her academic career in 2006 at the School of Architecture, Spiru Haret University. She taught architecture design, urban design, and public administration. In 2015 she coordinated the summer school where the students conducted research on the built patrimony in Sibiu, Romania, to then propose areas of architectural heritage to be protected. In December 2015 the results were exhibited at the National Theatre in Bucharest and in February 2016 in the Information Center of the Town Hall in Sibiu, sponsored by the Romanian Union of Architects.

== Memberships ==
She was a member of professional associations including the Association of Architects and Urbanists of Romania (APUR). She was also involved in improving the working conditions for women in her country. She became a member of L'Union Internationale des Femmes Architectes (UIFA) in 1990, and a member of the Professional Women's Club of Romania (ProFEM).

In 1990 she donated a portion of her archive to the collections of the International Archive of Women in Architecture (IAWA), Virginia Tech, United States.
