= Union Street Stores =

Shopping complex in San Francisco, California

Coordinates: 37.79792°N 122.4303°W

Union Street Stores is a shopping complex located in San Francisco, California, designed by architect Beverly Willis in 1963.

== Overview ==
The Union Street Stores is a shopping complex comprising nine retail units and two restaurants that was developed through adaptive reuse restoration of three Victorian residences. The project was designed by architect Beverly Willis in 1963. For her design achievement, Willis was awarded the State of California Governor’s Design Award of Exceptional Distinction and an American Institute of Architects Award of Merit. The project was among the first prototypes of adaptive reuse development as a means to “convert crumbling structures of the past into attractive, functional sites to serve modern business needs.” The decision to rehabilitate, rather than raze, the Victorian structures was prophetic of future revitalization efforts in San Francisco and in the U.S. The project “set the style for regeneration of the Union Street commercial district” and “foreshadowed national efforts to restore old buildings in city centers.”

== Design ==
The completion of the Union Street Stores, inspired the formation of a commercial district along a five-block stretch of a deteriorating area in San Francisco. It became a popular commercial destination in the city and "charting the course and the ambiance of the well-known shopping and dining mecca we know today.”
