= Manhattan Village Academy =

Public school in New York City

Coordinates: 40°44′31″N 73°59′31″W

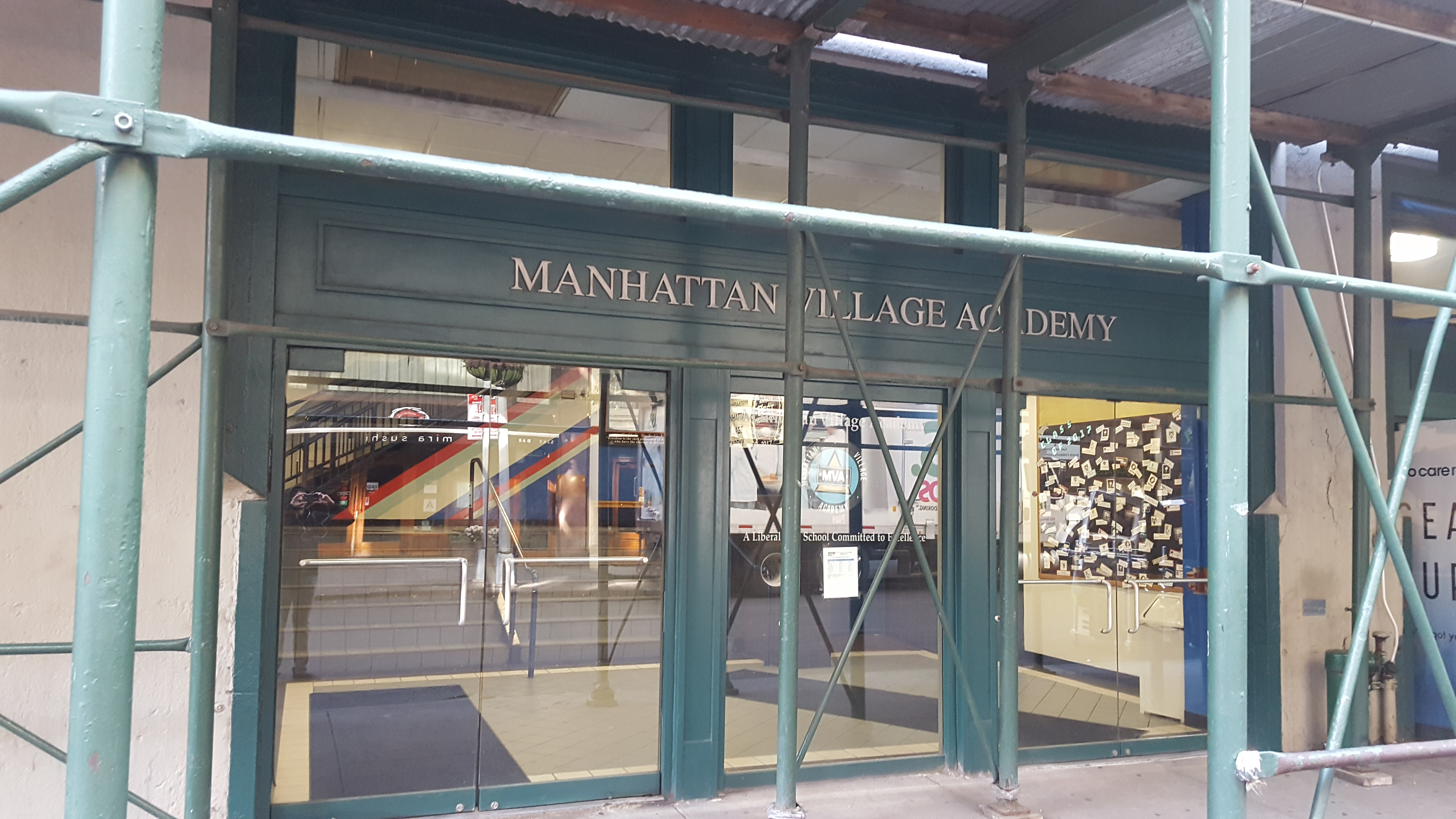
- 43 W. 22 St., Manhattan, New York City, USA 10010

Information
- School type: Public high school
- School district: 2
- Principal: Christina White
- Teaching staff: 29.84 (on an FTE basis)
- Grades: 9–12
- Enrollment: 461 (2020–21)
- Student to teacher ratio: 15.15
- Colors: Navy Blue and Gray
- Mascot: Silver Hawk
- Website: Manhattan Village Academy

Manhattan Village Academy (MVA) is a small, public high school located in the Flatiron District, New York City. It consists of grades 9–12 with an enrollment of 461 students. The school is part of the New York City Department of Education. The school was founded by veteran educator Mary Butz in 1993. The administration is currently headed by principal Christina White.

== History ==
Manhattan Village Academy was founded in 1993 by Mary Butz, a 25-year veteran of the New York City Board of Education. Butz was invited to establish this new small public high school by famed educator Deborah Meier, who worked closely with Ted Sizer and the Center for Collaborative Education. After selecting the site in a commercial loft building in the Chelsea district of Manhattan, Butz persuaded nationally known architect Beverly Willis to collaborate with her to design the space for the school. Butz recruited the students and faculty, and shaped the culture of the school around the ideas of "reason, respect, and responsibility." The motto of the school from its inception was "a good school dedicated to the liberal arts." In the first graduating class, every student went on to attend college. The school was recognized by Chancellor Rudy Crew as one of the best high schools in the city and was regularly ranked among the city’s best public schools under Butz’s leadership. She maintained policies of open enrollment, project-based assessment, and close attention to punctuality and student deportment. When she left the school in 1999, she selected Hector Geager to succeed her. Christina White became the interim principal of the school In September 2019, and was appointed principal of the school in March 2020, following Mr. Geager's retirement.

Admissions became selective in 2005.

== Incidents ==
In 2016, a 17-year-old student who had been bullied at the school left campus at lunchtime, stepped in front of a subway train, and was fatally struck.

== Facilities ==
Manhattan Village Academy is currently housed within three floors of an office building. It was part of a NYC Board of Education decision to place small, public schools in rented places. The historic art deco styled tower which houses the school is a New York City landmark. The interior of the school was designed by renowned architect Beverly Willis and the Architecture Research Institute. The floor plan features minimal long corridor spaces. Willis created the "Locus" plan, clusters of classrooms for each grade, four in total, each with a common area. Freshmen and sophomores have classes on the second floor while juniors and seniors have classes on the third floor. On the second floor, the two clusters are divided by a cafeteria space fenced in by small rails. The two clusters on the third floor are separated by a gym. The third floor also features a multimedia center complete with a library, computer lab, study space, and another classroom. The entrance is on the first floor and is accentuated with a long curved industrial-styled staircase. The designs for the school were completed in 1996 within a time period of 12 months

== Building design ==
Conceived as an alternative to the traditional high school, the Manhattan Village Academy was a replacement to the “old, assembly-line model of education with more active and personalized learning.” The New York Times hailed the academy as having “the intimate feel of a private liberal arts high school.”

The design by architect Beverly Willis created a customized program to fit the school's pedagogy and to support the administration, teaching, and learning process. Deborah Meiers, a leading national proponent of the concept of a small school education, saw Willis’ design approach to the MVA as a remedy to learning difficulties of high school students.

Located on three floors of two existing Beaux's Arts-style office buildings, the Board of Education's proposed plan for the loft was a set of standard plans for a series of classrooms off a corridor. Willis devised a locus plan− “a cluster of classrooms for each grade around an interior quad space, where teachers have a selection of a variety of spaces to fit a personalized approach to their students’ needs.” At the Manhattan Village Academy, “the educational philosophy is embedded in the architecture.” In addition to the reconfiguration of the classroom layout, Willis rejected the original plan's main entrance at the rear, adjacent to the freight exit. Instead, Willis designed “a grand high school faced in miniature; just inside the doors, four Greek-temple steps, done in marble, ascend to an aluminum spiral staircase, leading to the school’s second floor lobby.”

The open space of the locus plan center accommodates up to 100 students and is surrounded by three interconnected classrooms and a science laboratory with a folding wall that opens up to one of the classrooms. The building also contains a cafeteria, library, home economics classroom, and auditorium. The design incorporates glass walls and office windows that look out onto corridors and common areas to allow for continuous monitoring of student activity.

== Entrance requirements ==
Students applying for admission to Manhattan Village Academy are screened and a specified level of academic achievement is required for admission. Students and parents must attend an Open House event to be considered for admission. In the 2009 school year, there were 2,883 applicants for admission for only 100 seats available for 9th grade.

== Partnerships ==
The school is partnered with New York University, Bard College, John Jay College, and Hunter College.
