= Saddle River Center Historic District =

Historic district in New Jersey, United States

- U.S. National Register of Historic Places
- U.S. Historic district
- New Jersey Register of Historic Places
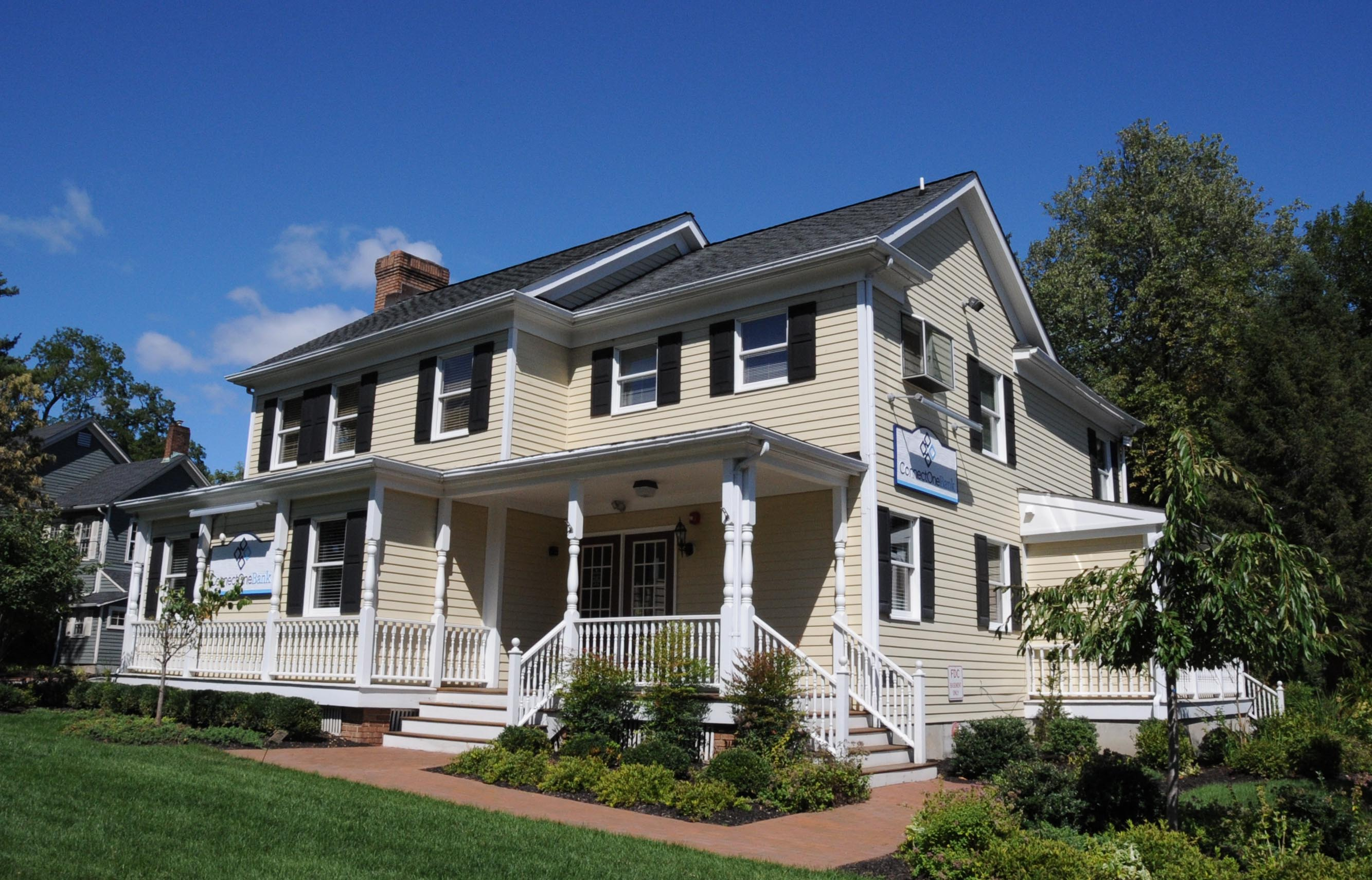
- William Packer Homestead

- Location within Bergen County, New Jersey Location within New Jersey Location within the United States
- Location: Along West Saddle River Road at junction of East Allendale Road, Saddle River, New Jersey
- Coordinates: 41°1′53″N 74°6′10″W
- Area: 65 acres (26 ha)
- Architectural style: Colonial Revival, Greek Revival, Late Victorian
- MPS: Saddle River MRA
- NRHP reference No.: 86001609
- NJRHP No.: 689

Significant dates
- Added to NRHP: August 29, 1986
- Designated NJRHP: June 13, 1986

The Saddle River Center Historic District is a 65-acre (26 ha) historic district located along portions of West Saddle River Road and East Allendale Road in the borough of Saddle River in Bergen County, New Jersey, United States. The district was added to the National Register of Historic Places on August 29, 1986, for its significance in agriculture, architecture, commerce, exploration/settlement and industry. The district includes 43 contributing buildings and 20 contributing structures. It was listed as part of the Saddle River Multiple Property Submission (MPS).

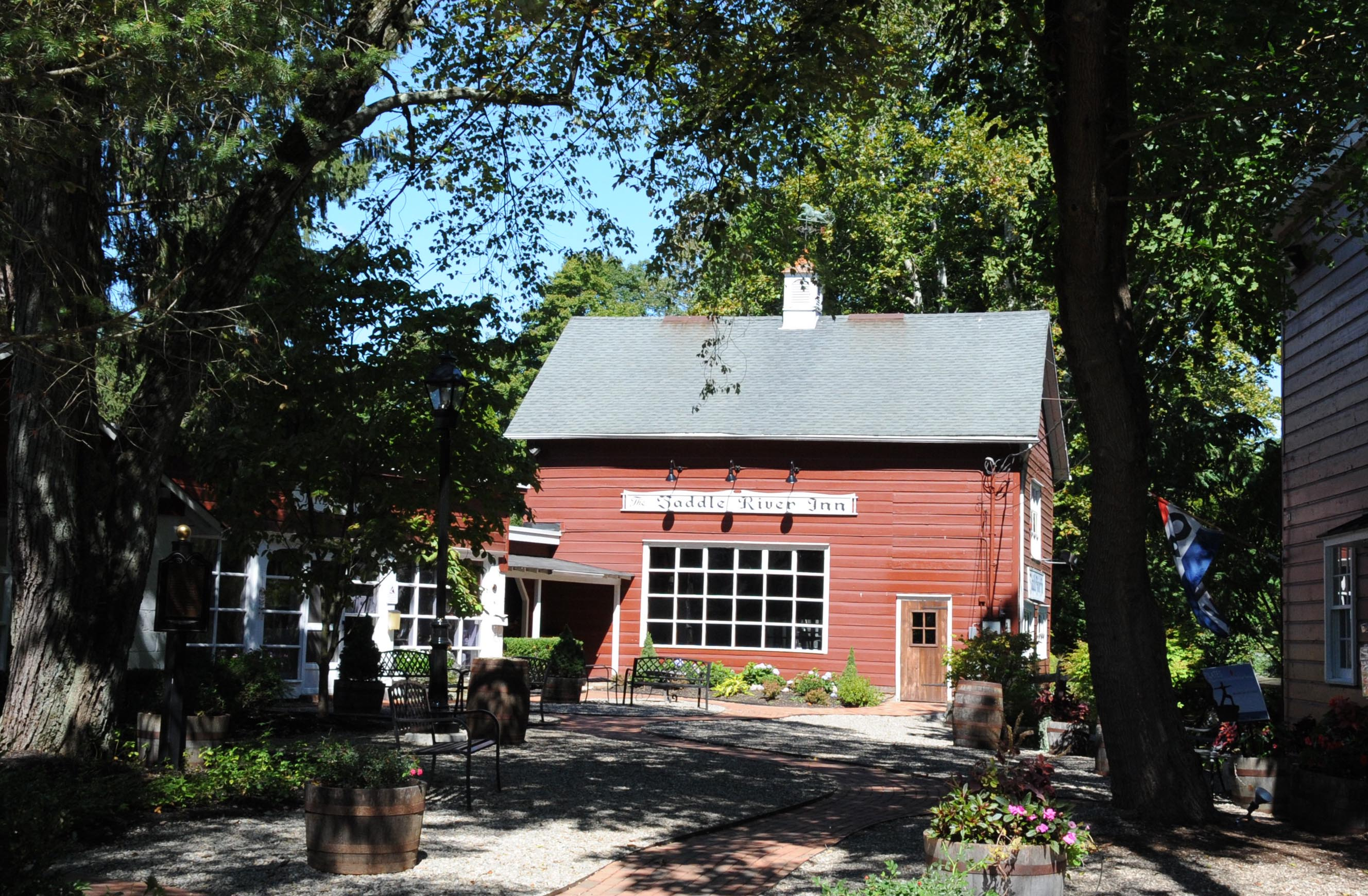
Saddle River Inn

== See also ==
- National Register of Historic Places listings in Bergen County, New Jersey
