= Computerized Approach to Residential Land Analysis =

Computerized Approach to Residential Land Analysis, known as CARLA, was a proprietary software program developed by the architectural firm Willis & Associates of San Francisco, California, in 1971.

== Overview ==
In the 1970s, there were not many architectural and engineering firms that recognized the computer’s potential as a tool for financial evaluation. Reynolds, Smith & Hills, a firm in Jacksonville, Florida, produced managing software designed to organize an array of financials that could help identify a successful development investment strategy. This application was limited to financial analysis and marked the first phase of computer application in architecture. In 1971, Willis and Associates innovated the computer’s spatial analysis capacities for application in architectural and land planning practices, foreshadowing the eventual development of computer-aided design and mapping programs in architecture and urban planning. CARLA was able to produce in a twenty-day period what by traditional methods and analyses would achieve in four to six months, allowing land development and construction to take place more rapidly. This was an important consideration in the 1970s when rates of inflation were rising and construction delays could introduce significant cost increases. CARLA could process “500% more information in 400% less time and at 40% of the cost generated by utilizing the more traditional methods.”

== Software Development ==
CARLA was a customized software program conceived by Beverly Willis and written in house by a Harvard Graduate School of Design student, Jochen Eigen, designed to analyze prospective land parcels for their development potential as large-scale multi-unit complexes. Jochen Eigen wrote the programming scripts that directed CARLA as the managing software to interface a variety of planning unit concepts with a mapping program that could then process a variety of planning proposals against the site’s fixed fields of relevant data. The data was extracted from traditional analog topographical maps soil analysis, and marketing information.

Once the physical characteristics were entered into CARLA, the computer could generate contour perspectives of the site from any point plotted along an x, y, x axis and help identify areas of common building suitability, natural drainage patterns slope analysis and areas requiring cut and fill. Using the CARLA grid as a structural template, multiple planning unit concepts were introduced and profiled against the site’s fixed characteristics and CARLA would then determine what plan, how many building units and of what variety could be successfully integrated into designated areas within the site. These tests were repeated until a match that produced environmentally and economically sound results was identified.

The computer graphic information reports were represented either in the form of topographical site perspectives, contour maps or as a sequence of numeric values organized within a template matrix that allowed the architect to identify the optimal relationships and planning concept. This work then became the basis for presentation materials that were used to introduce the client/developer to the proposed designs.

== Selected Projects ==
=== IRS Computer Center Building (unbuilt) ===
In 1976, Willis & Associates was awarded a federal building commission from the General Services Administration (GSA) in Washington, D.C., representing the Internal Revenue Service (IRS), and administered by the GSA office in Kansas City, Missouri. The project was conceived by the IRS as a prototype design that would be site-adapted for nine subsequent buildings in IRS regions across the country. The Computer Center Building was part of an $800 million program to automate tax returns at tax processing campuses servicing different IRS regions nationwide. Willis & Associates’ program CARLA provided the technical knowledge required for the IRS Computer Center Building.

=== Aliamanu Valley Community for Military Family Housing (1978) ===
In 1974, Willis & Associates, Inc., was awarded an architectural and engineering contract for the design and plan of the Aliamanu Valley Community for Military Housing in Honolulu, Hawaii. The project was a $110 million complex of 11,500 inhabitants, residing in 525 buildings on a 524-acre site. It was the first joint family housing venture in Hawaii. The community consisted of an Army-Navy complex of 2,600 family apartments: 1,600 Army apartments, 800 Navy apartments, and 200 for the Marine Corps.

Though CARLA had been previously used in designing multi-housing complexes on challenging sites, the Aliamanu site presented a greater challenge due to a non-active volcanic crater floor in a one hundred year old flood plain of clay. Fundamental to the development of an economical land-use plan for Aliamanu was the firm’s belief that the “best site plans are those that least disturb the land, that preserve the natural drainage channels and minimize need to cut and fill.” Land planning decisions were based on the principle−Less construction means less destruction. CARLA’s analyses allowed for less earth-moving for the project, causing less destruction to the environment and lowering overall construction costs.
