= Chris Hellman Center for Dance =

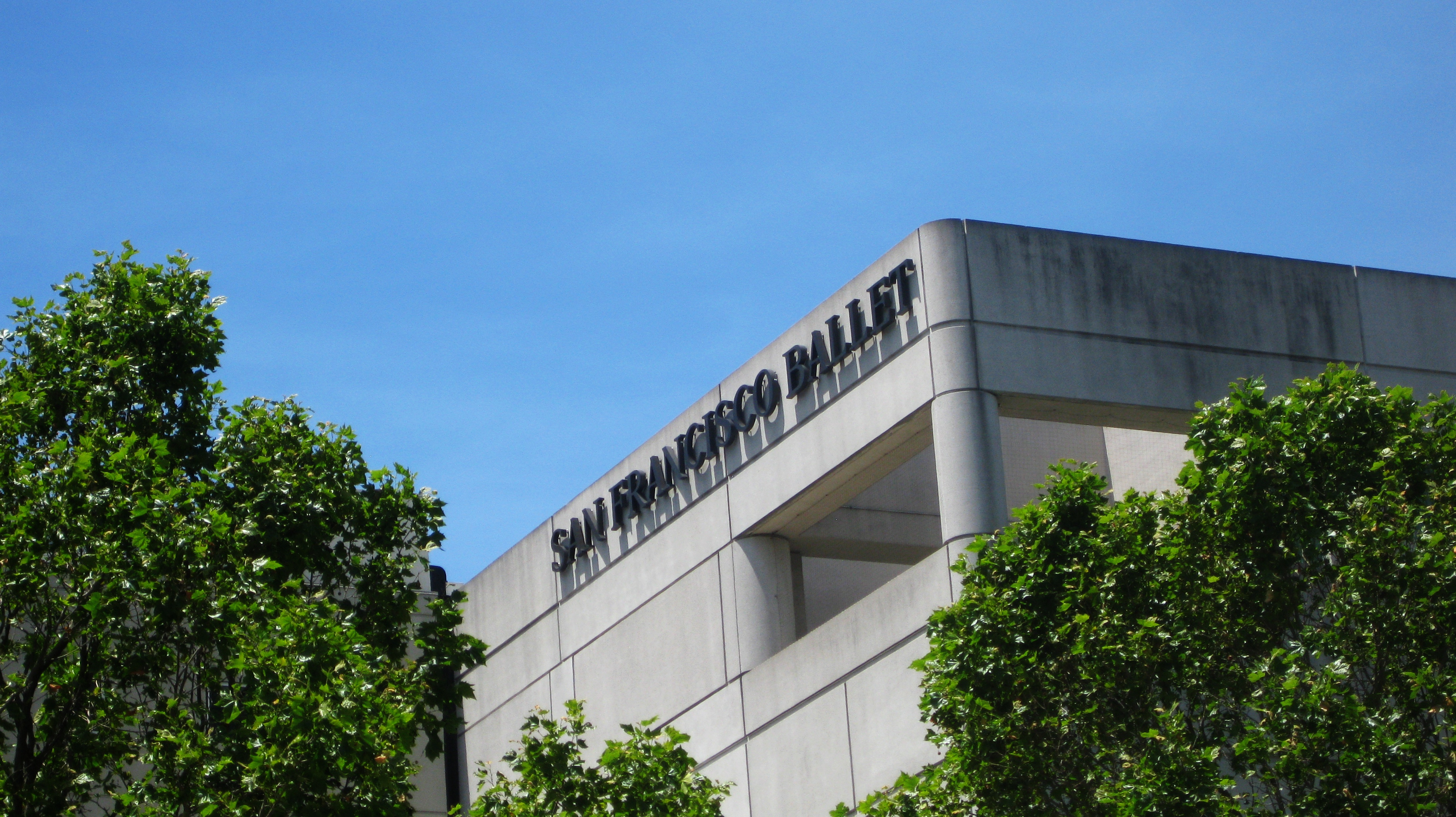

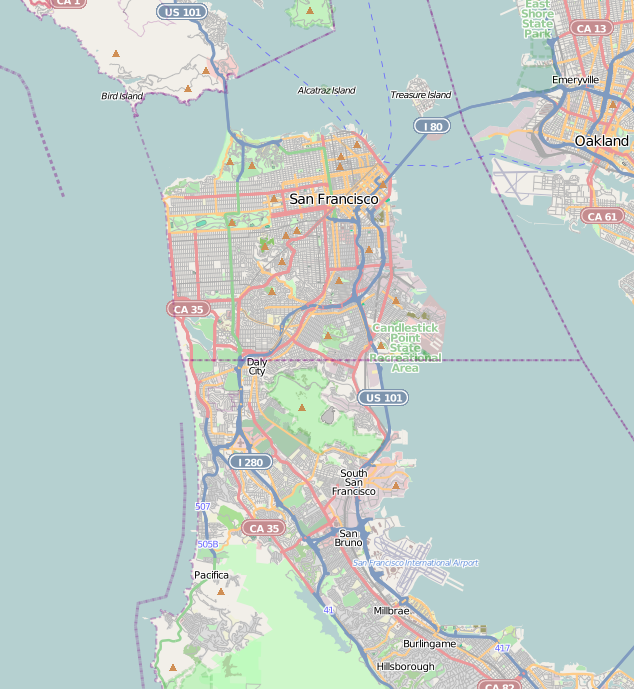
- Location within San Francisco
- Former names: San Francisco Ballet Building

General information
- Type: Performing arts center
- Architectural style: Postmodern
- Location: San Francisco, California, 455 Franklin Street
- Coordinates: 37.7786°N 122.4219°W
- Construction started: 1973
- Completed: 1984

Design and construction
- Architect: Beverly Willis

The Chris Hellman Center for Dance, formerly the San Francisco Ballet Building, is the studio and headquarters building of the San Francisco Ballet, located in the Civic Center neighborhood of San Francisco, California. The Postmodern-styled building was designed by architect Beverly Willis and completed in 1984, providing the company with a dedicated rehearsal space built to its own specifications. Dance critic Jennifer Dunning identified it as "the first building in the United States to be designed and constructed exclusively for the use of a major ballet company."

The San Francisco Ballet School is located in the building, along with the San Francisco Ballet's administrative offices and rehearsal spaces. The San Francisco Ballet continues to perform at the adjacent War Memorial Opera House, where it has been in residence since its founding. The San Francisco Ballet Building was renamed in honor of longtime board member and former dancer Patricia "Chris" Hellman in 2010.

== Overview ==
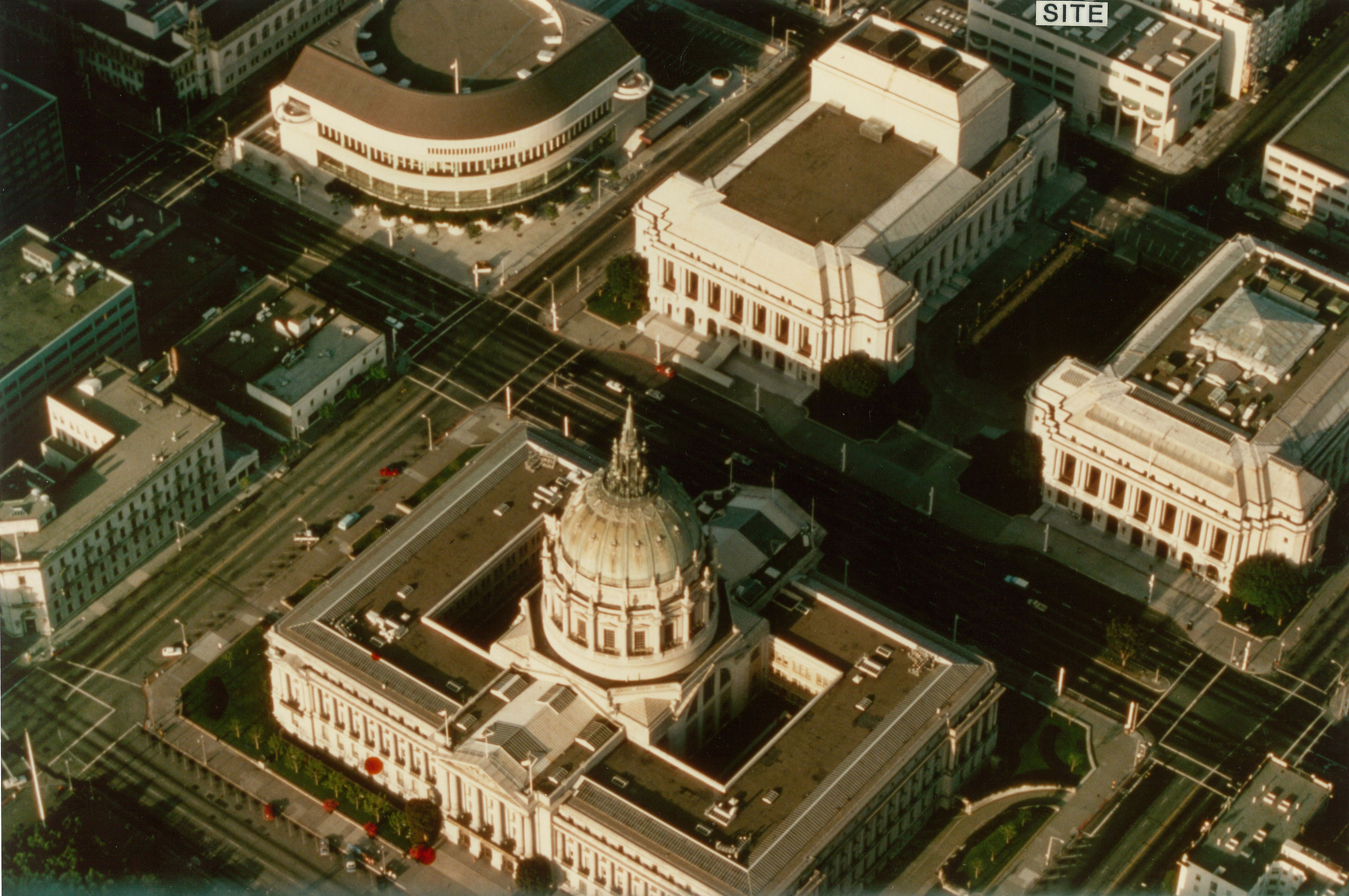
Ballet Building Site, Civic Center, San Francisco

The Chris Hellman Center for Dance is located within the Civic Center, San Francisco. Beverly Willis's design would later serve as a model for the design of future American ballet companies and schools. Upon completion, the San Francisco Ballet Building became a landmark achievement in the ballet world. The Boston Globe noted, "Dance people don't merely visit the San Francisco Ballet building: They make pilgrimages to it."

== Company history ==
The San Francisco Ballet was the first professional ballet company in the United States. The company was founded in 1933 as the San Francisco Opera Ballet under the leadership of ballet master Adolph Bolm. In 1942, the ballet separated from the San Francisco Opera to become its own independent company. The company's performances are currently based in the War Memorial Opera House, San Francisco. It is among the world's leading dance companies, presenting over 100 performances annually, with a repertoire that spans both classical and contemporary ballet. Along with American Ballet Theatre and the New York City Ballet, San Francisco Ballet has been described as part of the "triumvirate of great classical companies defining the American style on the world stage today."

With its origins in turn-of-the-century traveling companies, the San Francisco ballet routinely rented practice studios. In the late 1970s, the company was housed in a renovated parking garage on 18th Avenue, San Francisco, in a downstairs studio with ceilings so low that the dancers could not practice lifts for fear of hitting the beams. On the east coast, ballet companies like the American Ballet Theatre, were also housed in rented spaces and buildings shared with other performing arts groups. In 1983, the San Francisco Ballet Association became “the first American ballet company and school to break this pattern by constructing new quarters for itself."

== Design ==
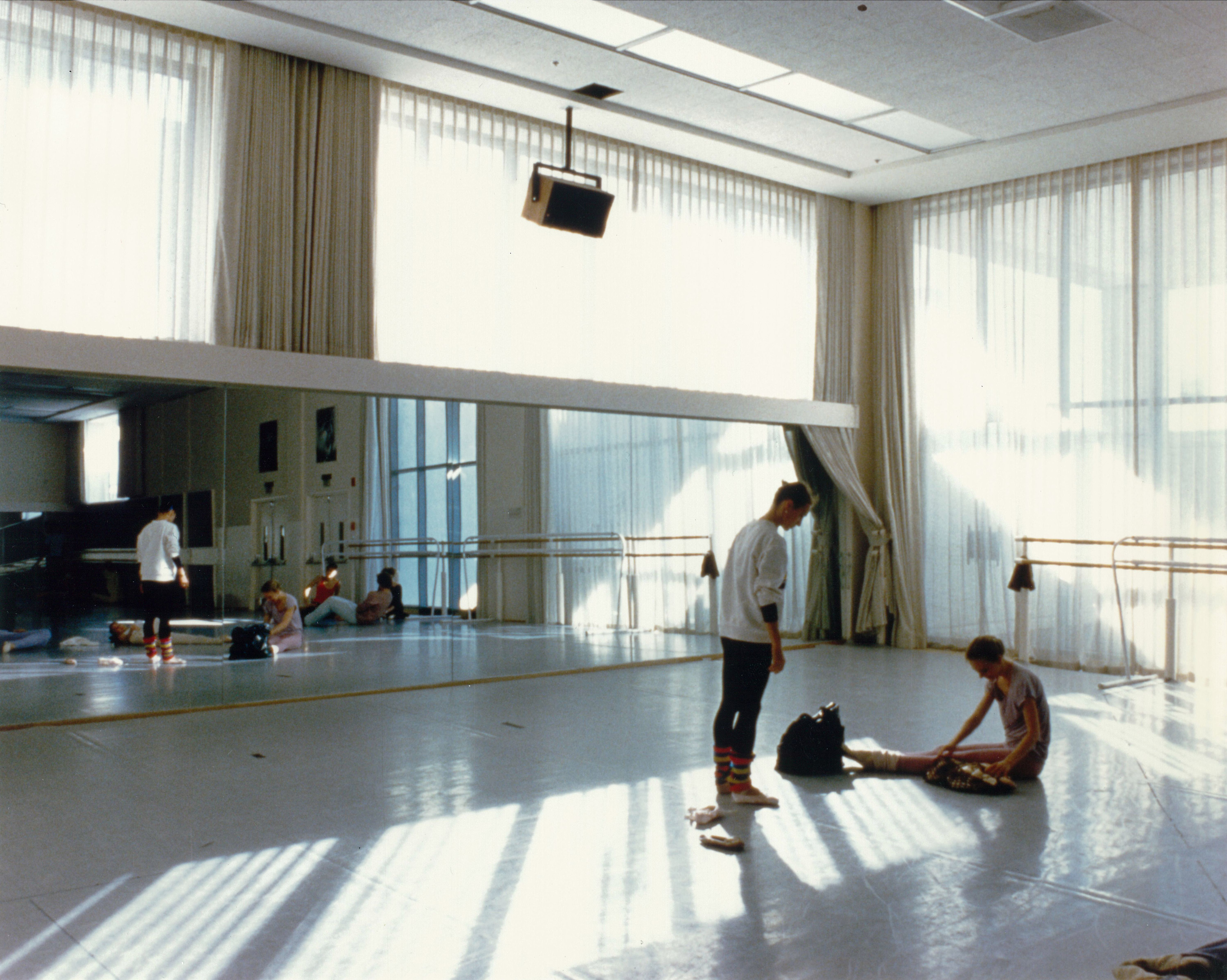
San Francisco Ballet Studio

Beverly Willis performed exhaustive research into the function of a ballet building, conducting numerous interviews with dancers on their needs and visiting the studios of major European ballet companies. The building includes facilities to support all of the activities of the company and school with the exception of set storage. The eight rehearsal and classroom studios have 15 feet high ceilings, to accommodate lifts, and average 56x40 feet in size. Additionally, there are administrative offices, a library with audiovisual equipment, and multi-purpose rooms for conferences, academic and choreographic study. Student and company members have physical therapy and workout rooms with gymnastic equipment, locker rooms with showers, separate lounges, and a computer room. Spaces accessible to the public include the ballet shop and a ground-floor studio for community outreach programs.

While the project would serve as a prototype for new ballet schools nationwide, the design was required to extend deference to the classical order of the Civic Center's architecture, characterized by grandeur of scale, simplicity of geometric forms, and dramatic use of columns. The San Francisco City Planning Department developed a set of design criteria for the building that specified a height of 96 feet, the location of cornice line levels, and the color and finishes of exterior materials, to ensure that the design was in context with the Neo-Renaissance architecture of the Civic Center.

To accomplish this, Willis incorporated elements of the Neo-Renaissance architectural vocabulary of the Civic Center− the rectangular geometry and the horizontal tripartite divisions of the base, middle and top, whose heights correspond to the opera house. The building's planned location was on an elongated and rectangular site, one-sixth the size of the adjacent performing arts structures. To be successfully contextual, it needed to appear massive to sustain a visual relationship with the monumental civic center buildings occupying over a square block. Willis sized the facade to monumental, classical proportions. The four story facade equaled in height a typical 8 story office building. The horizontal divisions of the base, midsection and top, as part of the facade, matched the heights of those of the adjacent civic center buildings. The rectangular form of the envelope produced a classical form, into which the ballet's interior functions fit. The proportion of the plan itself was a three to one classical ratio. The building is clad in a concrete material similar in color and texture to the other contemporary civic center structures.

Breaking with the classical tradition of symmetry, the proscenium-style main entry is located on the corner of the site. The building's two-story monumental entry at the corner accomplished several objectives: it connected the building with the Civic Center's master plan axis; it gave the building an identity within the performing arts complex, from the Van Ness Avenue perspective where the Opera and Symphony faced; and it avoided orienting the main entry towards the Opera House's blank rear wall.

The facade came out of the program like an abstraction and manifestation of the idea of ballet. The entry was envisioned as a proscenium arch. The rippling, curved glass within the entry is reminiscent of a stage curtain. The curved balconies over the entry arch are reminiscent of theater box seats. The facade is designed with solids and voids, curves and planes that play in constantly shifting light and shadows. The monumentality of the mass is softened by transparent layers that reveal the creative possibility, awaiting the birth of dance.

== Gallery ==
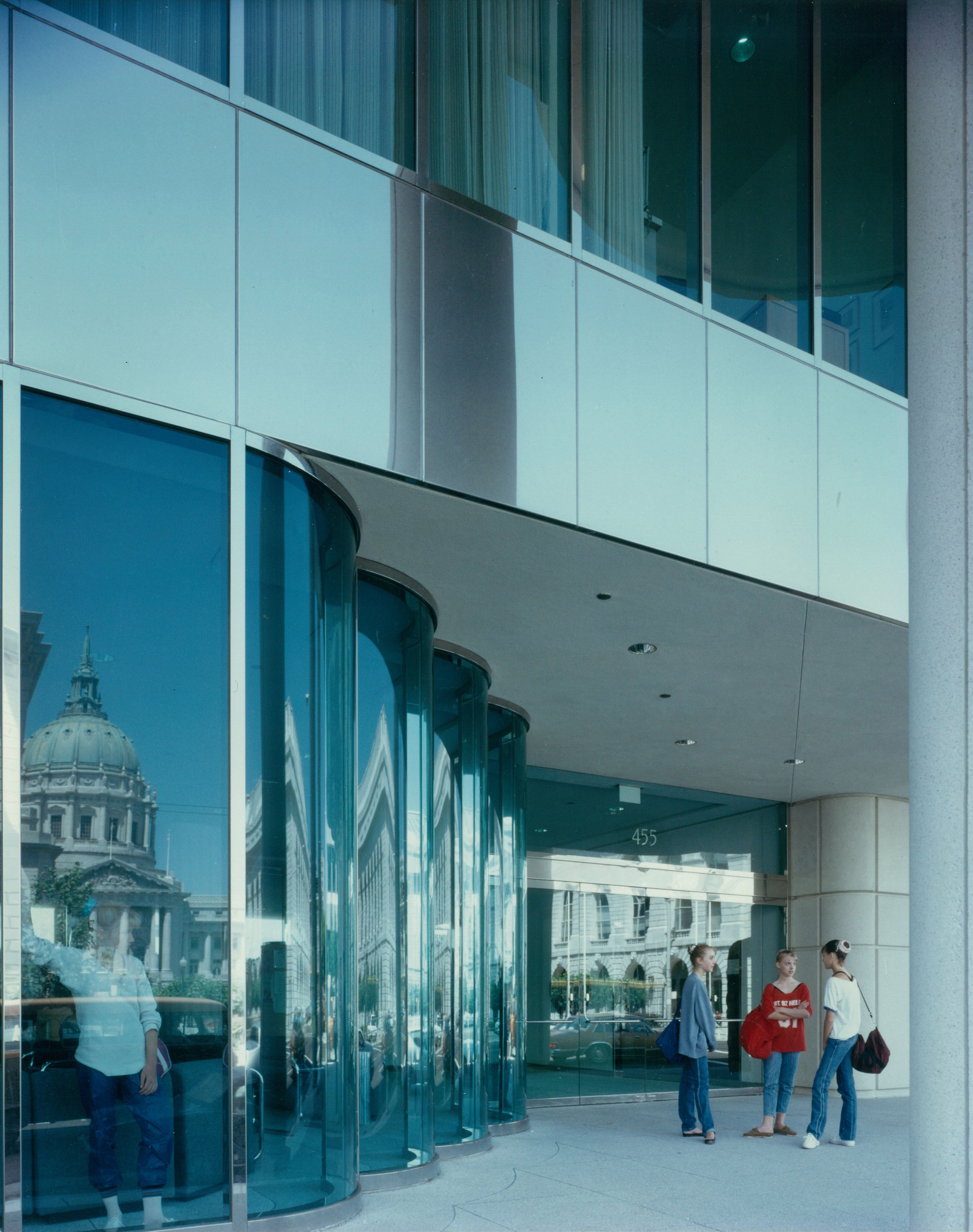
Entrance exterior

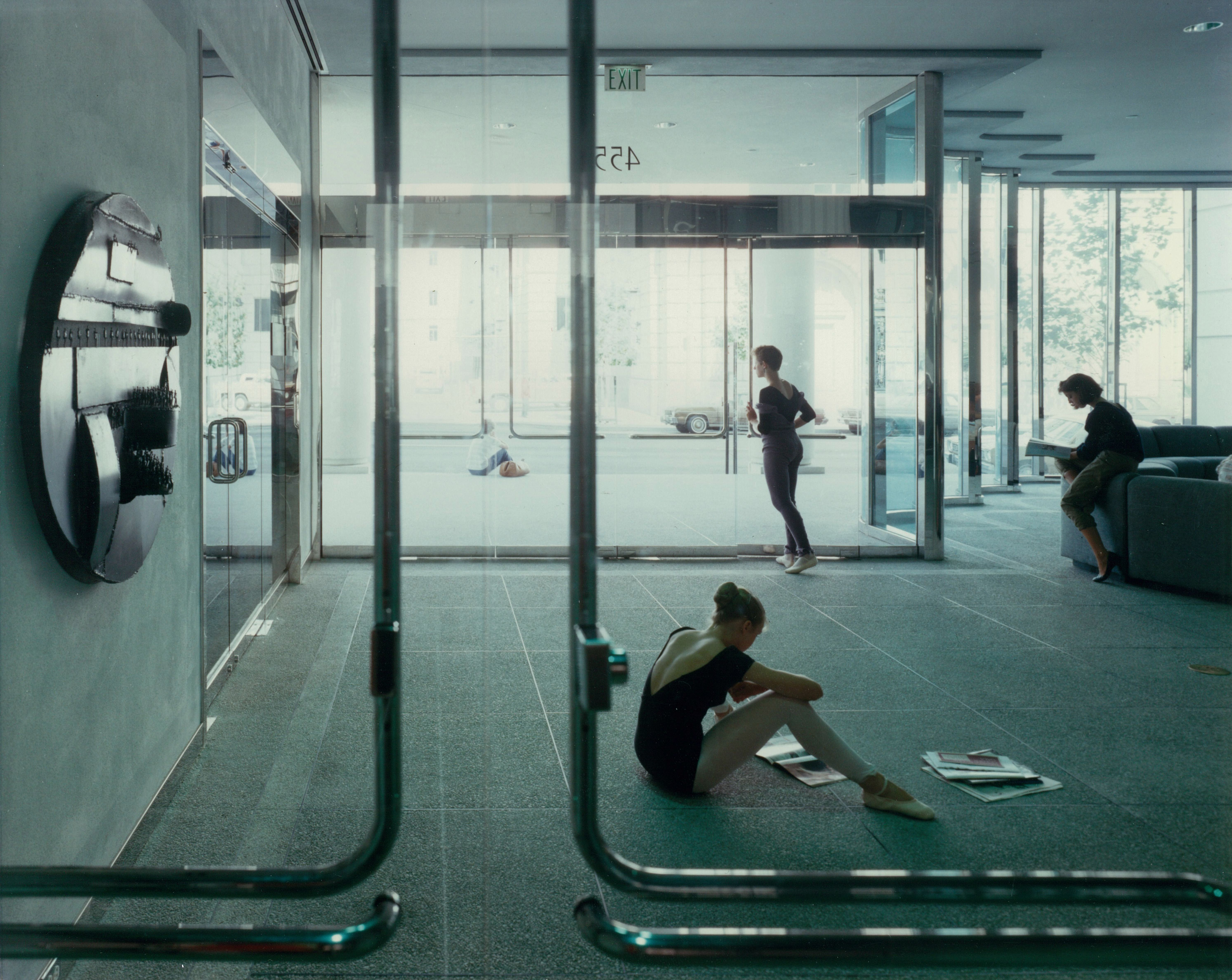
Entrance vestibule

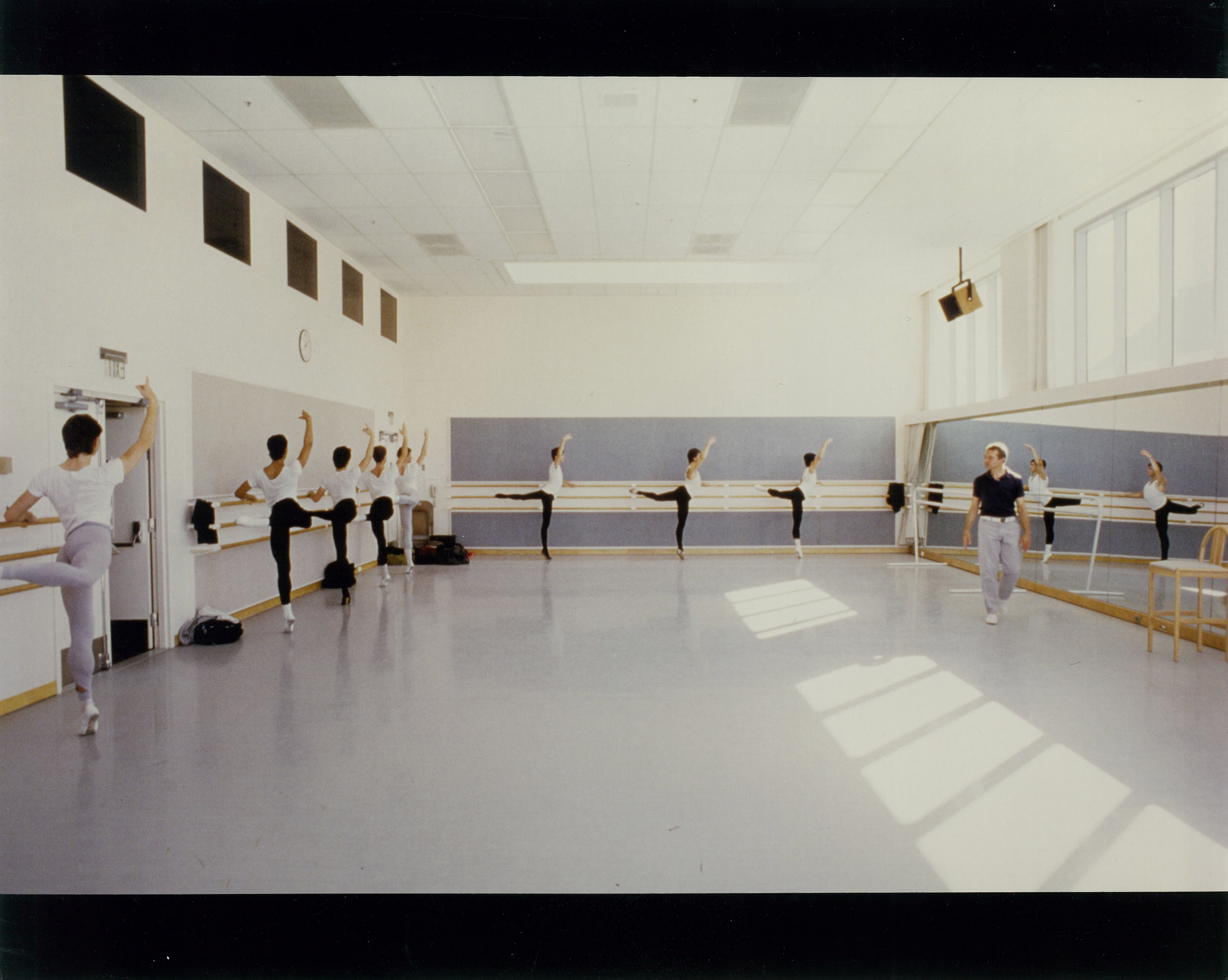
Practice studio
