= International Archive of Women in Architecture =

Archive at Virginia Tech

The International Archive of Women in Architecture (IAWA) was established in 1985 as a joint program of the College of Architecture and Urban Studies and the University Libraries at Virginia Tech.

== Purpose ==
The purpose of the Archive is to document the history of women's involvement in architecture by acquiring, preserving, storing, and making available to researchers the professional papers of women architects, landscape architects, designers, architectural historians and critics, urban planners, and the records of women's architectural organizations.

== Collections ==
The IAWA collects the papers of women who practiced at a time when there were few women in the field (i.e., before the 1950s) and to fill serious gaps in the availability of primary research materials for architectural, women's, and social history research. As of October 2006 there were over 1,200 cubic feet (34 m^{3}) of materials in the 298 collections in the IAWA, which are housed in Virginia Tech's University Libraries' Special Collections.

As part of its mission to act as a clearinghouse of information about all women architects, past and present, the IAWA also collects and catalogs books, monographs and other publications written by or about women architects, designers, planners, etc. These publications are accessible through the Virginia Tech library's online catalog, Addison.

The IAWA began with a collecting focus on the papers of pioneering women in architecture, individuals who practiced at a time when there were few women in the field. Today, the IAWA includes materials that document multiple generations of women in architecture, providing vital primary source materials for architectural, women's, and social history research. The collections includes material of relevant women architects as Diana Balmori, Olive Chadeayne, Doina Marilena Ciocănea, Mary Colter, L. Jane Hastings, Anna Keichline, Yasmeen Lari, Sarantsatral Ochirpureviin, Eleanore Pettersen, Berta Rahm, Trudy Rosen, Sigrid Lorenzen Rupp, Han Schröder, Anna Sokolina, Brinda Somaya, Pamela Webb, Beverly Willis, Zelma Wilson, and Liane Zimbler.

The IAWA also compiles biographical information. There is information about more than 650 women representing 48 countries and 42 states/territories in the United States available in the IAWA Biographical Database.

Some of the IAWA's resources, approximately 1200 images from 28 collections, have been scanned and are available through the VT ImageBase.

== Board ==
The IAWA is overseen by a board of advisors that includes architects, city planners, industrial and interior designers, librarians, archivists, and faculty from around the world and the U.S. The head of Special Collections or her designee serves as the Archivist for the IAWA and sits on the Board of Advisors and the Executive Board. She prepares a report for presentation to the annual meeting held in the fall of each year at Virginia Tech's Newman Library in the President's Board Room.

== Milka Bliznakov Research Prize ==
The Milka Bliznakov Research Prize was established in 2001 to honor IAWA founder and advisor emerita, Dr. Milka Bliznakov (1927-2010). The IAWA Center invites architects, scholars, professionals, students, and researchers to contribute research on women in architecture and related design fields. This research, in concert with the preservation efforts of the IAWA, will help fill the current void in historical knowledge about the achievements and work of women who shaped the built environment.

Past Milka Bliznakov Award and Research Prize Winners (2001-2015)

- 2016, Dr. Ines Moisset, "Women Architects on the Web" and Dr. Tanja Poppelreuter, "Refugee and émigré female architects before 1940"
- 2015, Claire Bonney Brüllman, "The Work and Life of Adrienne Gorska" and Sarah Rafson, "CARY (Chicks in Architecture Refuse to Yield)."
- 2014, Meredith Sattler, "Early Technological Innovation in the Systems Approach to Environmental Design: Situating Beverly Willis and Associates’ CARLA platform [Computerized Approach to Residential Land Analysis] within the developmental trajectory of Geographic Information Systems (GIS)."
- 2013, Robert Holton, "Natalie De Blois - The role and contribution in the design of three pivotal SOM projects completed in New York City between 1950-1960: the Lever House, the Pepsi-Cola building and the Union Carbide."
- 2012, Andrea J. Merrett, "Feminism in American Architecture: Organizing 1972-1975."
- 2011, Lindsay Nencheck, "Organizing Voices: Examining the 1974 Women in Architecture Symposium at Washington University in St. Louis."
- 2010, Inge Schaefer Horton, "Early Women Architects of the San Francisco Bay Area."
- 2009, Patrick Lee Lucas, "Sarah Hunter Kelly: Designing the House of Good Taste."
- 2008, Martha Alonso, Sonia Bevilacqua, and Graciela Brandariz, "Odilia Suárez: The Exemplary Trajectory of an Architect and Urbanist in Latin America."
- 2008, Despina Stratigakos, "A Woman’s Berlin."
- 2008, Milka Bliznakov Prize, Commendation, Lori Brown, feminist practices [exhibition].
- 2007, No prize awarded.
- 2006, Milka Bliznakov Prize, Commendation, Eran Ben-Joseph, Holly D. Ben-Joseph and Anne C. Dodge "Against All Odds: MIT's Pioneering Women of Landscape Architecture."
- 2005, Carmen Alonso Espegel, "Heroines of the Space."
- 2005, Isabel Bauer, "Architekturstudentinnen der Weimarer Republik."
- 2005, Bobbye Tigerman, "'I Am Not a Decorator' Florence Knoll, the Knoll Planning Unit, and the Making of the Modern Office."
- 2005, Milka Bliznakov Honorarium, Joseph Chuo Wang.
- 2004, Dorrita Hannah, "un-housing performance: The Heart of PQ."
- 2004, Janet Stoyel, "Sonicloth."
- 2003, Barbara Nadel,"Security Design: Achieving Transparency in Civic Architecture."
- 2003, Ozlem Erkarslan, "Turkish Women Architects in the Late Ottoman and Early Republican Era 1908-1960."
- 2002, Elizabeth Birmingham, "Searching for Marion Mahony: Gender, Erasure, and the Discourse of Architectural Studies."
- 2001, Claire Bonney, "The Work and Life of Adrienne Gorska."
