= J. J. Carlock House =

Historic house in New Jersey, United States

- U.S. National Register of Historic Places
- New Jersey Register of Historic Places
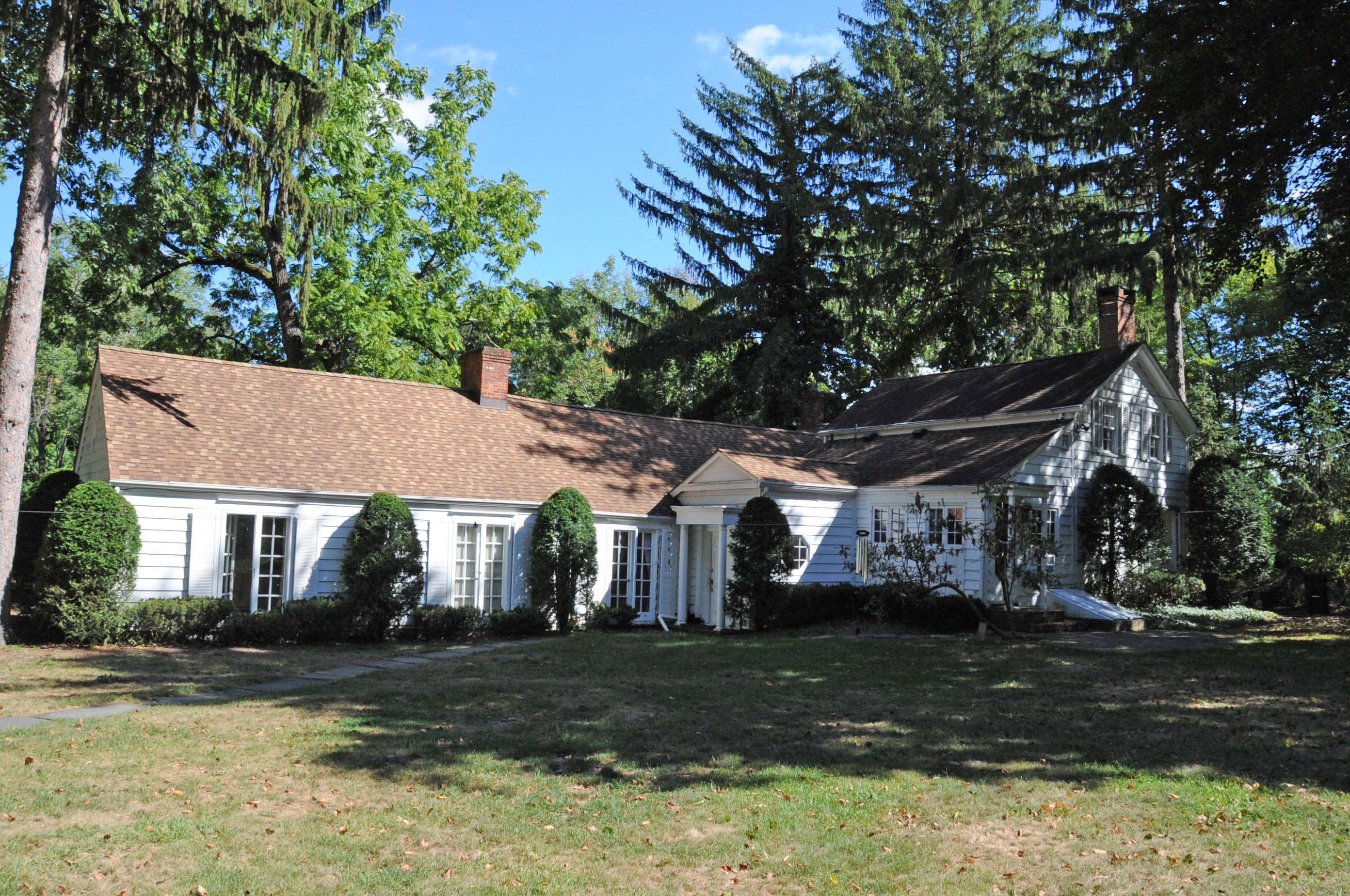

- Location within Bergen County, New Jersey Location within New Jersey Location within the United States
- Location: 2 Chestnut Ridge Road, Saddle River, New Jersey
- Coordinates: 41°0′21″N 74°5′22″W
- Area: 2.5 acres (1.0 ha)
- Built: 1825
- Architectural style: Greek Revival, Vernacular Greek Revival
- MPS: Saddle River MRA
- NRHP reference No.: 86001602
- NJRHP No.: 681

Significant dates
- Added to NRHP: August 29, 1986
- Designated NJRHP: June 13, 1986

The J. J. Carlock House is located at 2 Chestnut Ridge Road in the borough of Saddle River in Bergen County, New Jersey, United States. The house was built in 1825 and was added to the National Register of Historic Places on August 29, 1986, for its significance in architecture. It was listed as part of the Saddle River Multiple Property Submission (MPS).

The one and one-half story frame house features Colonial Revival architecture. The doorway has Greek Revival style.

== See also ==
- National Register of Historic Places listings in Bergen County, New Jersey
