= Milka Bliznakov =

Bulgarian architect and historian

Milka T. Bliznakov
- Born: September 20, 1927; Varna, Bulgaria
- Died: November 4, 2010 (aged 83); Blacksburg, Virginia
- Education: State Polytechnic of Sofia; Columbia University
- Occupation: Architect
- Awards: Parthena Medal (1985)

Milka Tcherneva Bliznakov (Bulgarian: Милка Близнаков; September 20, 1927 – November 4, 2010) was a Bulgarian architect and architectural historian. She was regarded as an authority on the avant-garde and Russian Constructivism. Her work focused on the often overlooked role of women in architecture and she founded the International Archive of Women in Architecture. She was Professor Emerita of Architecture at Virginia Tech from 1974 to 1998.

== Early life and education ==
Milka Bliznakov was born on September 20, 1927, in Varna, Bulgaria to Ivan Dimitrov Tchernev and Dr. Maria Kesarova Khorosova. She earned a master's degree in architecture from the State Polytechnic University of Sofia in 1951.

== Career ==
Bliznakov started an architecture practice in Bulgaria in 1952. Political circumstances forced her to move her practice to France in 1959. She immigrated to the United States two years later, in 1961. She worked as an architect and studied early Soviet architecture during the 1960s. After earning a PhD in architectural history from Columbia University in 1971, she taught at the University of Texas from 1972 to 1974. There she co-founded the Institute of Modern Russian Culture in 1972.

Bliznakov joined the faculty of Virginia Tech's School of Architecture and Design in 1974, teaching in the urban design program. She became recognized as an authority on the avant-garde and Russian Constructivism. In 1985, she established the International Archive of Women in Architecture (IAWA) as a joint program of Virginia Tech's College of Architecture and Urban Studies and the University Libraries.

She chaired IAWA's Board of Advisors from 1985 to 1993.

Bliznakov retired in 1998, the same year that the Milka Bliznakov Prize was established. The prize is awarded for research that furthers knowledge of women's contributions to architecture and design.

Bliznakov died at her Blacksburg, Virginia, home on November 4, 2010.

== Awards ==
Bliznakov received the Bulgarian government's Parthena Medal for Excellence in Architecture in 1985. She was the recipient of two International Research and Exchange grants and two Fulbright Hays Fellowships. She was also named a Wilson Center of the Smithsonian Institution Scholar in 1988 and was awarded a grant from the National Endowment for the Arts.

== Publications ==
- From Theory to Practice in Constructivist Architecture (1979). Division of Architecture and Environmental Design, Virginia Polytechnic Institute and State University.
- History and Theory of Urban Form (1985). College of Architecture & Urban Studies, Virginia Polytechnic Institute & State University.
- "A Bibliographical Guide to Their Work: Soviet Women Architects, 1917–1937" (1994)
