= Eleanore Pettersen =

American architect

- Born: 1916; Passaic, New Jersey
- Died: January 15, 2003 (aged 86–87); Saddle River, New Jersey, U.S.
- Education: Cooper Union
- Occupation: Architect
- Projects: Alford/Nixon House, Saddle River, New Jersey. Bear's Nest Townhome Development, Park Ridge, New Jersey.

Eleanore Kendall Pettersen (1916 – January 15, 2003) was an American architect. She was one of the first licensed female architects in New Jersey, where she operated a private practice from 1952 to 2002.

== Early life and education ==
Pettersen was born in 1916 in Passaic, New Jersey. She studied architecture at Cooper Union in New York City, completing her certificate in 1941. She returned to Cooper Union in 1976 to finish her Bachelor of Architecture.

== Career ==
In 1950, Pettersen became one of the first women in New Jersey to be licensed as an architect. She began her career as a draftsman for, and later an apprentice to, Frank Lloyd Wright, working in Arizona and Wisconsin at Taliesin; she studied under Wright between 1941 and 1943. She lived in Tennessee from 1946 to 1950, during which time she designed power buildings and facilities for the Tennessee Valley Authority. In her early career, she also worked for the National Defense Research Committee, a job which involved analyzing the structures of enemy buildings.

Pettersen established a private architectural practice in Saddle River, New Jersey, in 1952—making her the first woman in the state to open an architectural firm—and maintained it until 2002. During those 50 years, she designed more than 600 projects, both residential and commercial. Over the years she employed a number of interns and apprentices (often women), preferring to hire right out of architecture school. Within a few weeks of being hired and initiated into the firm’s detail-oriented method, the new employees were assigned their own projects and were encouraged to work closely with the clients and to follow their projects through not only the design but building aspects as well. In July 1970, Pettersen formed Design Collaborative, an interior design component to her architectural firm, furthering her thorough involvement in the design process.

Pettersen was primarily a residential architect. Perhaps her most famous work was a 1971 design of a 15-room house in Saddle River for businessman John Alford. Alford sold the house in 1981 to former U.S. president Richard Nixon, who lived there after resigning from politics. Pettersen also designed Bears Nest, a gated residential village in Park Ridge, New Jersey, where Nixon also lived after leaving Saddle River. She was licensed in six states other than New Jersey: Connecticut, Georgia, Maine, Massachusetts, New York, and North Carolina.

She was owner of two firms: Eleanore Pettersen, A.I.A., an architectural firm, and Design Collaborative, specializing in interior design.

Pettersen's accomplishments were myriad, and she pioneered many "firsts" for women. In 1978, she became the first woman elected president of the New Jersey Board of Architects. She became the first female president of the American Institute of Architects' (AIA) New Jersey chapter in 1985 and its first female regional director two years later. She was appointed to the AIA College of Fellows in 1991. In 1965, she was the first female recipient of Cooper Union's Professional Achievement Citation for Distinguished Accomplishments. She was the first woman appointed by the governor to the New Jersey State Board of Architects and subsequently its first woman president (1975–1976). In 1984, she became first female president of the New Jersey Society of Architects.

From 1968 to 1970, Pettersen served as president of the Bergen County Altrusa Club, which is an organization for professional women.

== Awards and exhibitions ==
Pettersen was featured in three exhibitions, namely:

- Ageless Perceptions IV – Senior Women in Architecture at the SOHO20 Gallery (New York City, 1991)
- Eleanore Pettersen, FAIA/Four Decades at the Center of Northern New Jersey (New Milford, NJ, 1991)
- Taliesin Legacy: The Independent Work of Frank Lloyd Wright Apprentices at the Pratt Manhattan Gallery (New York, 1992)

She received several awards, including:

- 1965: Professional Achievement Citation – Cooper Union
- 1967: North Jersey Architectural Award – North Jersey Cultural Council and Architects League of Northern New Jersey
- 2010: Michael Graves Lifetime Achievement Award – American Institute of Architects New Jersey, posthumously conferred
- Pioneer Women of the 90's Honoree - County Executive William
- Augustus Saint-Gaudens Award for Architecture - Cooper Union
- Named a New Jersey Woman of Achievement - Douglass College and the New Jersey State Federation of Women
- Elizabeth Cady Stanton The World Is Moving Award - Given by the Women's Rights Information Center
- Outstanding Services Award - New Jersey Commission on Women
- President's Citation for Meritorious Service - New Jersey Society of Architects

== Death and legacy ==
Pettersen died in 2003 in Saddle River, at the age of 86. Her papers are collected at Virginia Polytechnic Institute and State University. (Note: The Eleanore Pettersen Architectural Collection, 1915–2010 (bulk 1950–2000), A Collection in Special Collections Collection Number Ms2003-018. It includes fifty years of drawings, models and professional, personal and family papers and photos. The collection is divided into five series.)

She is the namesake of the "Eleanore Pettersen lecture" at Cooper Union, which discusses "principles of design excellence and ecological innovation". She was included in "A Girl is a Fellow Here" ~ 100 Women in the Studio of Frank Lloyd Wright , a documentary film produced by the Beverly Willis Architectural Foundation.
