= Beverly Willis =

American architect (1928–2023)

Beverly Willis FAIA
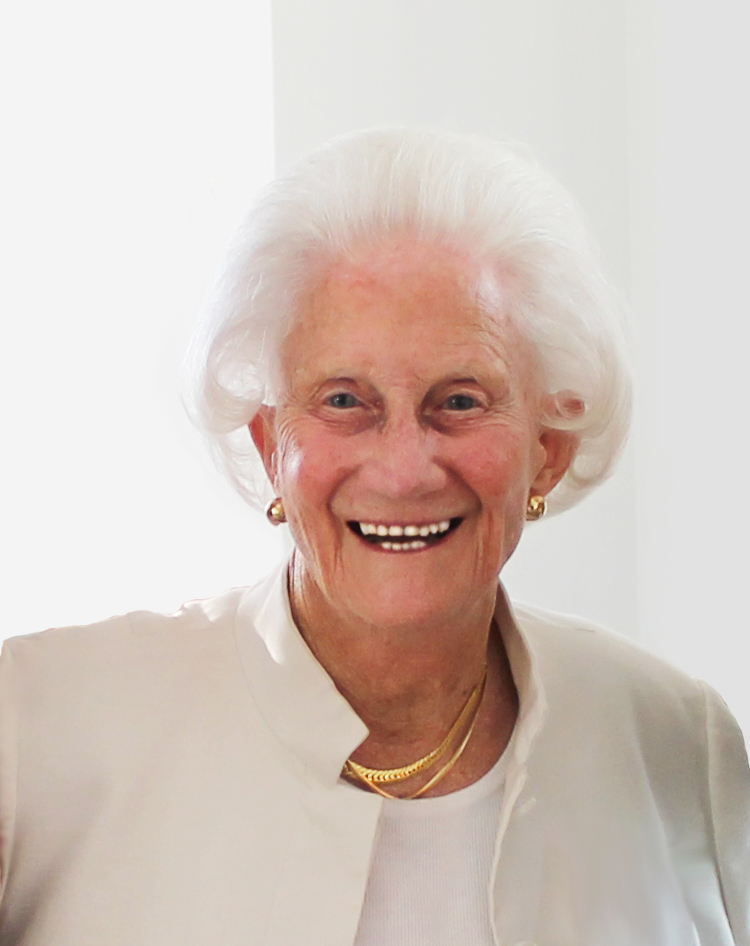
- Born: February 17, 1928; Tulsa, Oklahoma, U.S.
- Died: October 1, 2023 (aged 95); Branford, Connecticut, U.S.
- Education: University of Hawaiʻi
- Occupation: Architect
- Buildings: Manhattan Village Academy: New York, New York; San Francisco Ballet Building: San Francisco, California; Union Street Shops: San Francisco, California; Yerba Buena Gardens: San Francisco, California; Aliamanu Valley Community: Honolulu, Hawaii
- Projects: Computerized Approach to Residential Land Analysis: CARLA

Beverly Willis FAIA (February 17, 1928 – October 1, 2023) was an American architect who played a major role in the development of many architectural concepts and practices that influenced the design of American cities and architecture. Willis' achievements in the development of new technologies in architecture, urban planning, public policy and her leadership activities on behalf of architects are well known. Her best-known built work is the Chris Hellman Center for Dance (formerly the San Francisco Ballet Building) in San Francisco, California. She was a co-founder of the National Building Museum, in Washington, D.C., and founder of the Beverly Willis Architecture Foundation, a non-profit organization working to change the culture for women in the building industry through research and education.

== Early life and education ==
Beverly Willis was born in Tulsa, Oklahoma, daughter of Margaret Elizabeth Porter, a nurse, and Ralph William Willis, an oil industry entrepreneur and an agriculturalist. Willis' brother, Ralph Gerald Willis (1930–1999), served in the United States Army and later retired to the Fiji Islands.

During World War II, at age 15, Willis learned to fly a single-engine propeller plane in order to qualify for the Women's Air Service. Willis then moved with her mother, now divorced, to Portland, Oregon, where Willis graduated from high school. Willis studied engineering at Oregon State University from 1946 to 1948. She graduated from the University of Hawaiʻi in 1954 with a Bachelor of Fine Arts degree with honors.

== Career ==
=== Willis Atelier ===
After graduating from the University of Hawaiʻi, Willis founded the Willis Atelier in Waikiki, where she continued the mural and fresco work begun in college under the training of Jean Charlot. In Charlot's studio, Willis was introduced to the geometric and organic connections between art and nature, analyzing plants, buds, and flowers to discover nature's intrinsic geometry. This understanding of the relationship between geometry, nature, and beauty would later influence her humanistic design approach to architecture.

In 1956, Willis pioneered a technique for sand cast mural panels, including a panel used in the Shell Bar at the Royal Hawaiian Hilton. The Shell Bar, also designed by Willis, became a backdrop in the television series Hawaiian Eye.

=== Beverly Willis Architects ===
In 1958, Willis opened a design office in San Francisco, California. Her early career as a multi-media artist, in Honolulu, Hawaii, led to her work in retail store design, for which she was nationally recognized. In the late 1960s, when suburban expansion was booming, Willis combined her retail experience with large-scale housing, that later evolved into designs for institutions, urban planning and development. She is best known for her innovative approaches to new and varied building uses, including: the San Francisco Ballet Building, the first building in the US designed exclusively for the used of a Ballet company and school; the Union Street Stores, that some historians describe as an initial contribution to the advancement of the Modern adaptive re-use of historical buildings movement; and the Manhattan Village Academy, a New York City Department of Education high school that was a prototype for new teaching concepts embodied in small or charter schools.

Willis's innovations were based on extensive research and the resulting architectural designs were developed from specific, often new, building functions, giving each building an individualized appearance. Among Willis's most notable achievements was the in-house development and coding of the computer program, Computerized Approach to Residential Land Analysis, called CARLA, in 1970. In 1995, Willis founded the Architecture Research Institute to study the future development of global cities. In 1997, the National Building Museum published her book, "Invisible Images– The Silent Language of Architecture." Realizing that women's significant and distinguished contributions to architecture were not included in the historical narrative of architecture – and understanding that the future is based on the past – she founded the Beverly Willis Architecture Foundation, in 2002, with the mission of changing architecture culture through research and education.

=== Willis and Associates Architects ===
Willis and Associates Architects was created and dedicated with the task of providing insurance and risk management solutions to architects and engineers. It was developed over 39 years ago and has served over 500 design firms around North America.

== Architecture ==
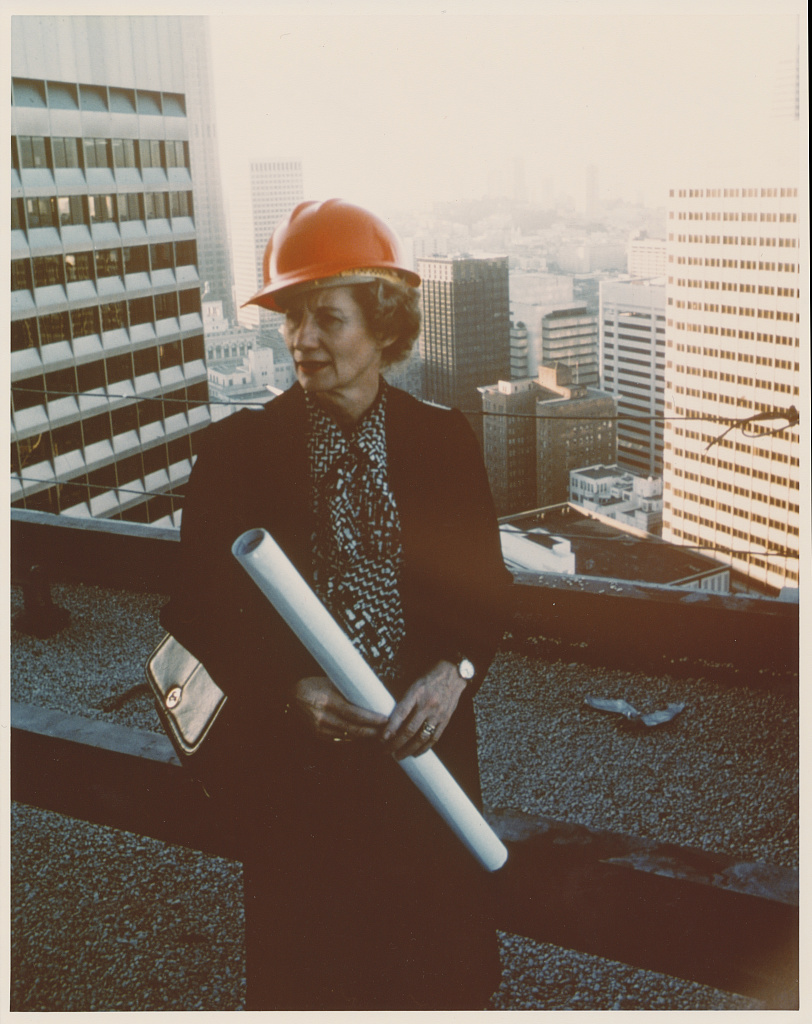
Willis in 1982

Beverly Willis' architecture is rooted in a humanistic design approach that is reflected in the individualistic, functional plans of her buildings. Willis' work extends from the belief that design can influence human behavior and that the spatial concepts of form, function, proportion, texture, and color visually communicate with the senses. At the core of Willis' concept of a humanistic design is her belief that form follows function and a Vitruvian understanding of the relationship between design, nature, and proportion as expressed in De architectura.

Her architecture portfolio spans diverse scales, from retail spaces to residences, commercial structures, and cultural facilities. One of her most notable design achievements, the San Francisco Ballet Building, was without precedent in the United States. At the time of its completion in 1984, the San Francisco Ballet Association Building was the first building in the United States to be designed and constructed exclusively for the use of a major ballet institution. The building, located within San Francisco's Civic Center District, went to serve as a model for the design of future American ballet companies and schools.

In 1974, Willis & Associates, Inc., was awarded an architectural and engineering contract for the design and plan of the Aliamanu Valley Community for Military Housing in Honolulu, Hawaii. The project was a $110 million family-housing complex of 11,500 inhabitants, residing in 525 buildings on a 524-acre site. Though CARLA had been previously employed successfully, Willis' firm faced a greater challenge presented by the Aliamanu site, located on a non-active volcanic crater floor in a one hundred year old flood plain of clay. Through the use of CARLA's analyses, Willis' plan for Aliamanu projected earth-moving for the project at 40% less than the previous firm's plans, causing less destruction to the environment and lowering overall construction costs.

Resulting from their technical achievements in the development of the proprietary computerized approach to residential land analysis known as CARLA, in 1976, Beverly Willis & Associates was awarded a federal building commission from the General Services Administration (GSA) in Washington, D.C., representing the Internal Revenue Service (IRS). Though never built as a result of federal policy shifts in the regulation of computer data privacy, the project was conceived by the IRS as a prototype design that would be site-adapted for nine subsequent buildings in IRS regions across the country as part of an $800 million program.

Among Willis' other notable design achievements are the Union Street Stores, recognized as one of the pioneering projects in historic preservation and adaptive reuse projects in both San Francisco and the United States, and the Manhattan Village Academy in New York City. The Manhattan high school received national recognition for its design and was published as one of the exemplary examples of architecture in education facilities by the American Institute of Architects.

== Service to the profession ==
Willis' services to the profession are many. These include being a founding trustee of the National Building Museum, in Washington, D.C. In 1976, Willis joined The Washington Post art and architecture critic Wolf von Eckhardt, architect Clothiel Woodward Smith, Smithsonian architecture historian Cynthia Fields, and attorney Herbert Franklin to create the National Building Museum. Housed in the former U.S. Pension Bureau's Headquarters, four blocks from the National Mall, the museum's mission is to "advance the quality of the built environment by educating people about its impact on their lives." She served on the U.S. Government delegation to the United Nations conference on Habitat I in 1976. She was the first woman to be president of the California Chapter of the American Institute of Architects in 1979. Her last location of office was Beverly Willis Architect (6 Rockland Park, Branford, Conn. 06405)

== Death ==
Beverly Willis died of complications from Parkinson's disease at her home in Branford, Connecticut, on October 1, 2023, at the age of 95.

== Significant buildings ==
- Manhattan Village Academy, 400-student high school in loft space, 43 West 22nd Street, New York City (1996)
- River Run Residence, Napa Valley, California (1983)
- San Francisco Ballet Building, San Francisco Performing Arts Center, Civic Center, San Francisco, California (1982)
- Yerba Buena Gardens, 24-acre (97,000 m^{2}) mixed-use development of an art center, theater, offices, retail, hotel, gardens; co-master planner and conceptual designer (1980)
- Aliamanu Valley Community, 525 buildings housing 11,500 people; Corps of Engineers, Honolulu, Hawaii (1979)
- Pacific Point Condominium Apartments, Alpha Land Company, Pacifica, California (1975)
- Vine Terrace Apartments, (now known as Nob Hill Court Condominiums), 930 Pine Street, San Francisco, California (1973)
- Union Street Stores, 1980 Union Street, San Francisco, California (1965)
- Margaret S. Hayward Playground Building, City of San Francisco Recreation and Parks Department, San Francisco, California (1965)
- Robertson Residence, Yountville, California (1960)

== Awards and honors ==
=== Awards ===
- 2018 AIA New York Visionary Award, sponsored by the Center for Architecture
- 2015 New York Construction Award for public service, sponsored by the New York Building Congress (NYBC) and industry partners, the American Council of Engineering Companies of New York (ACEC-NY) and American Institute of Architecture New York (AIA-NY), awarded to the Beverly Willis Architecture Foundation and accepted by Beverly Willis. (2015)
- American Institute of Architects New York Chapter (AIA-NY) Special Citation, awarded to Beverly Willis at 2015 Annual Meeting (2015)
- Lifetime Achievement Award from the National Association of Professional Women in Construction (2011)
- Top Women in Real Estate Award, New York Resident Magazine (2010)
- American Planning Association's New York Metro Chapter's Lawrence Orton Award for Excellence in City and Regional Planning cited Rebuild Downtown Our Town, co-directed by Beverly Willis. (2003)
- National Association of Home Builders, Merit Award, River Run Residence, St. Helena, California. (1985)
- California Council of the American Institute of Architects Merit Award, Margaret S. Hayward Playground Building, San Francisco, California. (1984)
- Gold Nugget Grand Award, Pacific Coast Builders Conference and Builders Magazine, for Best Recreational Facility, Margaret S. Hayward Playground Building, San Francisco, California. (1983)
- American Institute of Architects (AIA) Award of Merit, 1976 Homes for Better Living Awards Program, Vine Terrace Apartments, San Francisco, California. (1976)
- Award for Exceptional Distinction for Environmental Design for work on Union Street by the Governor of California. (1967)
- AIA Bay Area Award for Union Street Store Development at 1980 Union Street. (1967)
- Significant Achievement in Beautification Citation by Buildings Magazine for the Transamerica Title Building in Oakland, California. (1966)
- Merit Award in Office Renovation for the Campbell-Ewald Building, San Francisco, California by the American Institute of Building Design. (1965)

=== Honors ===
- Montgomery Fellowship, Dartmouth College (1992)
- Honorary Doctorate of Fine Arts, Mount Holyoke College (1982)
- Fellowship American Institute of Architects (1980)
- U. S. Government Delegate to "Habitat I" the 1976 United Nations Conference on Human Settlements (1976)
- Phoebe Hearst Gold Medal Award for Distinguished Service to San Francisco (1969)

== Exhibitions ==
- Women in American Architecture 1888–1988: The Exceptional One. Exhibit organized by the American Institute of Architects and the American Architectural Foundation exhibited in Washington DC; Denver, Colorado; and Los Angeles.
- The Outdoor Chair. Cooper-Hewitt Museum, the Smithsonian Institution's National Museum of Design, New York. (1988)
- The Outdoor Chair. Contract Design Center, San Francisco. (1987)
- Yerba Buena Gardens. San Francisco Museum, San Francisco. (1984)
- Group Oil Paintings Exhibit. Honolulu Gallery of Art Museum, Honolulu, Hawaii. (1956)
- One-Person Exhibit: Watercolors. Maxwell Gallery, San Francisco. (1952)

== Scholarship ==
=== Books ===
- Willis, Beverly. Invisible Images: The Silent Language of Architecture, a Design Memoir. Washington, D.C.: National Building Museum, 1997. ISBN 978-0-9619752-8-9.
- Willis, Beverly and Dr. Ronald S. Graybeal. "Computerized Financial Analysis," in Harry A. Golemon, ed. Financing Real Estate Development. New Jersey: Aloray, 1974. ISBN 978-0-913690-01-7.
- Willis, Beverly. "The Environmental System Decision-Making Process" in Ravinder K Jain and Bruce L. Hutchings, eds. Environmental Impact Analysis: Emerging Issues in Planning. Urbana: University of Illinois Press, 1978. ISBN 978-0-252-00696-8
- Willis, Beverly. "Towards a Sustainable City: Rebuilding Lower Manhattan" in Mike Jenks and Nicola Dempsey, eds. Future Forms and Design for Sustainable Cities. Amsterdam; Boston: Architectural Press, 2005.ISBN 978-0-7506-6309-0.
- Willis, Beverly. "If It's Tuesday, It Must be Singapore" in Iris Miller and Robert A. Bosser, eds. Visions and Reflections on Utopia and Reality. Washington, D.C.: American Institute of Architects, 1991.
- Willis, Beverly. "Towards a Sustainable City" in Ulla Terlinden, ed. City and Gender: International Discourse on Gender, Urbanism and Architecture. Leske + Budrich, Opladen, Hanover, Germany. 2003. ISBN 978-3-8100-3495-3
- Willis, Beverly, ed. The Architect and the Shelter Industry. Washington, D.C.: The American Institute of Architects, 1975. LCCN 75325678.

=== Symposiums ===
- Grands Projets – Its Lessons and Legacies, a one-day retrospective assessment of the history of the Grands Projets in France, co-sponsored with The Cultural Services of the French Embassy, and hosted by the Guggenheim Museum.
- Working Neighborhoods: Failed Policies and Fresh Directions, a one-day assessment of new directions for development of working neighborhoods, co-hosted by the Association of Collegiate Schools of Architecture, and held in New York City and Oakland California.

=== Papers ===
==== Architecture Research Institute ====
- Towards a Sustainable City: Rebuilding Lower Manhattan, Oxford Brookes University, Oxford 2004.
- The R.Dot Project: Rebuilding Lower Manhattan, Fifth International Architecture Symposium, Pontresina, Switzerland, September 12–14, 2002.
- Towards a Sustainable City, International Women's University Conference, Hanover, Germany, September 2000.
- Re-Examining the Courtyard Block: A Megacity Habitat for the New Working Family, Megacities 2000 Conference, Spring 2000, University of Hong Kong, Hong Kong, China.
- Spatial Speculations. Embodied Utopias – Gender, Social Change, and the Built Environment Conference, 1999, University of Chicago Gender Center, sponsored by the Graham Foundation for Advanced Studies.
- Megacities: Re-Examining the Sidewalk as Public Space. The Second International Symposium on Asia Pacific Architecture, Making of Public Spaces, University of Hawaii, East-West Center, Honolulu, Hawaii, April 1998.

==== R.Dot ====
- Neighborhoods and Housing Lower Manhattan- A Mixed income Community, New York, April 14, 2004.
- Arts and Culture: Revitalizing Lower Manhattan Through Arts and Culture, New York, January 23, 2003.
- Retail Strategies for Revitalizing Lower Manhattan, New York, January 16, 2003.
- Design Program for the World Trade Center and Lower Manhattan, New York, October 7, 2002.
- Managed Streets – Street Life is Crucial to the Revitalization of Lower Manhattan, New York, June 15, 2002.
- Rebuilding Lower Manhattan and the World Trade Center, New York, February 19, 2002.

=== Films ===
- 100 Women Architects in the Studio of Frank Lloyd Wright - "A Girl is a Fellow Here." Written and directed by Beverly Willis. New York, New York: Beverly Willis Architecture Foundation, 2009. DVD-R. 496520677
- Built for Ballet – An American Original. Written by Meg Pinto. Directed by Tim Sakamoto. New York, New York: Beverly Willis Architecture Foundation, 2011. DVD-R. 808630020
- The Artist Beverly Willis – Honolulu and San Francisco Years 1948–1968. Written, directed and edited born Mark Mitchell. New York, New York: Beverly Willis Architecture Foundation in collaboration with the Beverly Willis Archive, 2013. DVD-R.
- The Architect Beverly Willis – San Francisco and New York Years 1958–1995. Written, directed and edited born Mark Mitchell. New York, New York: Beverly Willis Architecture Foundation in collaboration with the Beverly Willis Archive, 2013. DVD-R.
- Unknown New York: The City that Women Built. Directed by Beverly Willis. New York, New York: Beverly Willis Architecture Foundation, 2018. The documentary is 17-minutes long and highlights the many female architects, engineers, and builders behind 234 projects in Manhattan.

== Philanthropy ==
=== Architecture Research Institute ===
In 1995, Willis created the Architecture Research Institute as a think-tank to develop and advocate urban policies through interdisciplinary partnerships between academics, governments, corporations and the public. The Institute sought to "promote research in design and planning that informs public policies and strategies that create livable, compact, global cities that are eco-sustainable, walk-able and less automobile dependent."

The Institute developed and advocated urban policies to make global cities more livable. After the collapse of the World Trade Center on 9/11, the Institute co-founded Rebuild Downtown Our Town (R.Dot) with Susan Szenasy, editor Metropolis Magazine. R.Dot mobilized hundreds of designers, professionals, and civilians to create a coordinated response to help guide the rebuilding effort and establish a planning framework for the city of New York.

=== Beverly Willis Architecture Foundation ===
Displeased with the relative dearth of scholarship on women in the architecture history books, in 2002, Willis and Heidi Gifford, established the Beverly Willis Architecture Foundation (BWAF), a nonprofit 501(c)(3) national research and educational organization, to advance the knowledge and recognition of women's contributions to architecture. The Beverly Willis Architecture Foundation's (BWAF) mission is "to change the culture of the building industry so that women's work, whether in contemporary practices or historical narratives, is acknowledged, respected and valued." BWAF collaborates with museums, professional organizations and other groups in the areas of architecture, design, landscape, engineering, technology, real estate and construction. A program of BWAF, is Emerging Leaders, which was created in 2017 to build a professional development opportunity once women are out of school for five to ten years. Women who are chosen to participate will get the chance to build relationships with significant senior women in architecture, engineering, construction, real estate, law, and financial services to advance their own career goals. They share common experiences and trade personal strategies for success.

== See also ==
- List of California women architects
