= River Vale, New Jersey =

Township in Bergen County, New Jersey, US

- Township
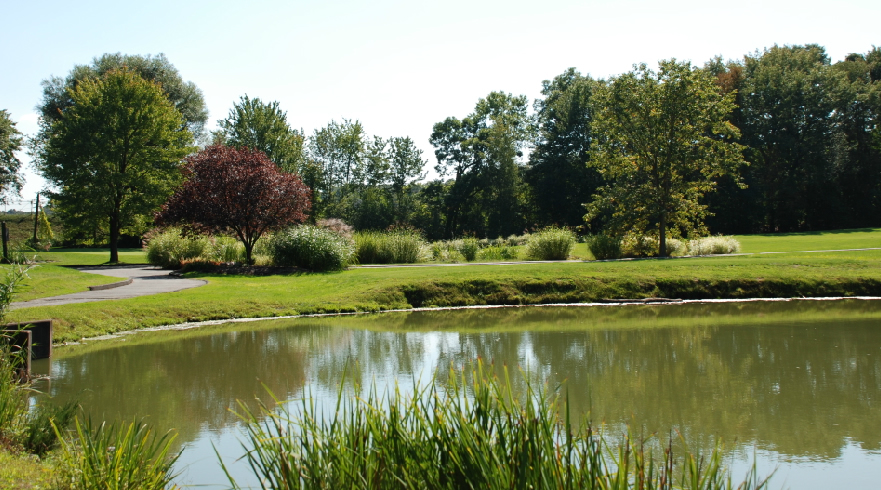
- River Vale Country Club, hosting one of three golf courses in the Township

- Seal

- Location of River Vale in Bergen County highlighted in red (left). Inset map: Location of Bergen County in New Jersey highlighted in orange (right).

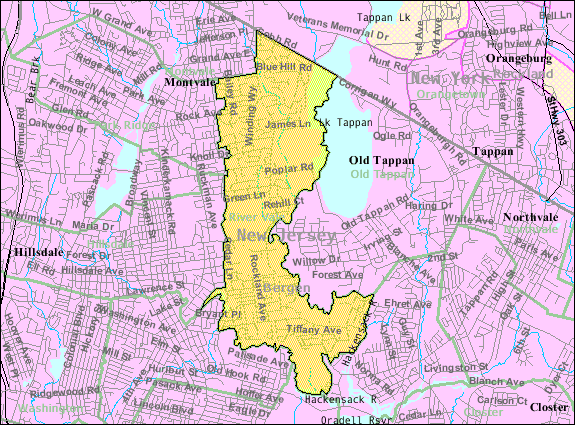
- Census Bureau map of River Vale, New Jersey

- Location in Bergen County Location in New Jersey Location in the United States
- Coordinates: 41.014201°N 74.006774°W
- Country: United States
- State: New Jersey
- County: Bergen
- Incorporated: April 30, 1906

Government
  - Type: Faulkner Act Mayor-Council
  - Body: Township Council
  - Mayor: Mark Bromberg (R, term ends December 31, 2026)
  - Administrator: Gennaro Rotella
  - Municipal clerk: Karen Campanelli

Area
  - Total: 4.31 sq mi (11.17 km^{2})
  - Land: 4.07 sq mi (10.54 km^{2})
  - Water: 0.24 sq mi (0.63 km^{2}) 5.64%
  - Rank: 289th of 565 in state 17th of 70 in county
- Elevation: 39 ft (12 m)

Population (2020)
  - Total: 9,909
  - Estimate (2023): 10,111
  - Rank: 249th of 565 in state 41st of 70 in county
  - Density: 2,434.6/sq mi (940.0/km^{2})
  - Rank: 257th of 565 in state 53rd of 70 in county
- Time zone: UTC−05:00 (Eastern (EST))
  - Summer (DST): UTC−04:00 (Eastern (EDT))
- ZIP Code: 07675
- Area code: 201
- FIPS code: 3400363690
- GNIS feature ID: 0882310
- Website: www.rivervalenj.org

River Vale is a township in Bergen County, in the U.S. state of New Jersey. River Vale is the easternmost municipality in an area of the county referred to as the Pascack Valley. As of the 2020 United States census, the township's population was 9,909. It was ranked #29 on the 100 Best Places to Live 2007 survey published by CNN/Money magazine.

River Vale was formed as a township on April 30, 1906, from portions of both Hillsdale Township (now Hillsdale Borough) and Washington Township. The township was named for its location along the Hackensack River.

On January 5, 1904, the temperature in River Vale fell to −34 °F (−37 °C), the lowest temperature ever recorded in New Jersey.

== History ==
The earliest settlers of what would become River Vale were the Lenape Native Americans.

Before 1841, present-day River Vale was part of Harrington Township. It used to be known as the "Over Kill Neighborhood" or just "Over Kill"—it being over the kill (Hackensack River) from Tappan. Its southern part, known as Eastwood (named in contrast to Westwood), became an independent borough in 1894, but was dissolved and re-absorbed into Washington Township in 1896.

River Vale was incorporated as a township in 1906, formed from portions of both Hillsdale and Washington Township. On July 15, 1929, part of River Vale was ceded to Park Ridge. On May 20, 1959, territory was acquired from Montvale.

In 1967, a mass grave site was discovered in River Vale from an event in 1778 during the American Revolutionary War, the Baylor Massacre. This became widely known due to a February 1968 report to the Bergen County Board of Chosen Freeholders, "1778 – The Massacre of Baylor's Dragoons." The burial site was made into a county park that was dedicated on October 15, 1972.

On July 28, 1994, the residents of River Vale voted to recall Mayor Walter Jones, Councilwoman Patricia Geier and Councilman Bernard Salmon, following a battle between residents and the mayor and some council members over the mayor's plan to merge River Vale's 9-1-1 center to a regional dispatch center located in Park Ridge.

A River Vale resident, Henry Hoffman, directed the scrapping of USS Enterprise in Kearny from 1958 to 1960. Following Hoffman's death in 1965, the stern plate of the Enterprise was placed on a Little League baseball field as a memorial. The field was later named Hoffman Field. On October 2, 2000, the stern plate was moved to the township's Veterans' Memorial Park.

In March 2004, the township became the first municipality in the state to be placed on probation by the Municipal Excess Liability Joint Insurance Fund, a fund that covers legal expenses of member municipalities and government agencies. The issue was due to the number and scope of legal cases against the township, its employees and its governance, plus what David Grub, chief executive of the fund, called "a general environment of personal attack". The fund urged the township to update employment practices and better train managers to avoid liabilities. As a result of these issues, The New York Times called the township "small but litigious".

== Geography ==
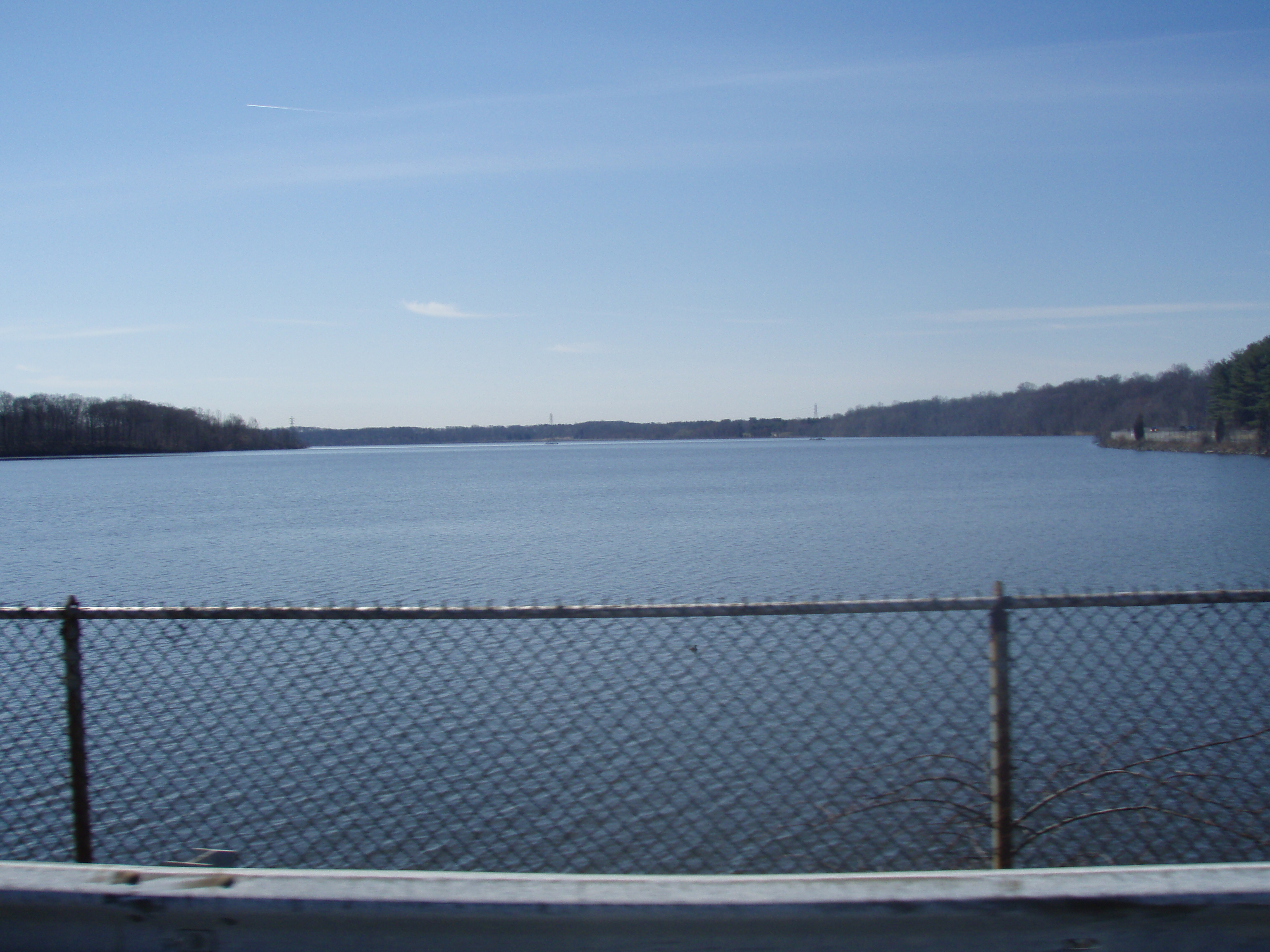
The Lake Tappan reservoir straddles the Bergen County municipalities of Old Tappan and River Vale, as well as a smaller portion within adjacent Rockland County, New York.

According to the United States Census Bureau, the township had a total area of 4.31 square miles (11.17 km^{2}), including 4.07 square miles (10.54 km^{2}) of land and 0.24 square miles (0.63 km^{2}) of water (5.64%).

The township is bordered by Montvale to the northwest, Park Ridge, Woodcliff Lake (a very small section) and Hillsdale to the west, Westwood to the southwest, a small section bordering Emerson to the south, Harrington Park to the southeast, Old Tappan to the east, and Pearl River, New York to the north.

Its borders are defined by the Hackensack River to the east, which was dammed to form Lake Tappan, and Pascack Brook to the south. The northern border is defined by the New York-New Jersey state border. The western border has several sections, including a section defined by an unnamed creek and a section defined by Cedar Lane.

The southern portion of the township lies between the Hackensack River and Pascack Brook, and is relatively flat. The northern portion slopes down from rolling hills in the west into Lake Tappan to the east. Much of the land is developed as suburban single-family residences, but there remain some undeveloped areas. The undeveloped areas are mostly wooded and are south and west of Lake Tappan, following the Cherry Brook and the Hackensack River watershed. In 1996, plans to develop watershed land received resistance from the community. In the southwest of the township, the Pascack Brook County Park also preserves a wooded area. There are three golf courses in the township, two 18-hole public courses, and a private 18-hole course.

There is a small commercial district surrounding the intersection of Rivervale Road and Westwood Avenue in the southern portion of the township.

== Demographics ==
Historical population
Census	Pop.	Note	%±
1900	266		—
1910	450		69.2%
1920	583		29.6%
1930	871		49.4%
1940	1,112		27.7%
1950	1,699		52.8%
1960	5,616		230.5%
1970	8,883		58.2%
1980	9,489		6.8%
1990	9,410		−0.8%
2000	9,449		0.4%
2010	9,659		2.2%
2020	9,909		2.6%
2023 (est.)	10,111		2.0%
Population sources: 1910–1920 1910; 1910–1930 1900–2020; 2000 2010 2020

=== 2020 census ===
As of the 2020 United States census, the township's population was 9,909, an increase of 250 (+2.6%) from the 2010 census count of 9,659, which in turn reflected an increase of 210 (+2.2%) from the 9,449 counted in the 2000 census.

River Vale township, Bergen County, New Jersey – Racial and ethnic composition Note: the US Census treats Hispanic/Latino as an ethnic category. This table excludes Latinos from the racial categories and assigns them to a separate category. Hispanics/Latinos may be of any race.
Race / Ethnicity (NH = Non-Hispanic)	Pop 2000	Pop 2010	Pop 2020	% 2000	% 2010	% 2020
White alone (NH)	8,470	8,186	7,756	89.64%	84.75%	78.27%
Black or African American alone (NH)	50	64	117	0.53%	0.66%	1.18%
Native American or Alaska Native alone (NH)	0	2	8	0.00%	0.02%	0.08%
Asian alone (NH)	556	809	993	5.88%	8.38%	10.02%
Native Hawaiian or Pacific Islander alone (NH)	2	0	1	0.02%	0.00%	0.01%
Other race alone (NH)	9	10	30	0.10%	0.10%	0.30%
Mixed race or Multiracial (NH)	58	107	273	0.61%	1.11%	2.76%
Hispanic or Latino (any race)	304	481	731	3.22%	4.98%	7.38%
Total	9,449	9,659	9,909	100.00%	100.00%	100.00%

=== 2010 census ===
The 2010 United States census counted 9,659 people, 3,421 households, and 2,709 families in the township. The population density was 2,408.1 per square mile (929.8/km^{2}). There were 3,521 housing units at an average density of 877.8 per square mile (338.9/km^{2}). The racial makeup was 88.85% (8,582) White, 0.70% (68) Black or African American, 0.04% (4) Native American, 8.42% (813) Asian, 0.00% (0) Pacific Islander, 0.53% (51) from other races, and 1.46% (141) from two or more races. Hispanic or Latino of any race were 4.98% (481) of the population.

Of the 3,421 households, 37.4% had children under the age of 18; 70.2% were married couples living together; 6.6% had a female householder with no husband present and 20.8% were non-families. Of all households, 18.4% were made up of individuals and 11.5% had someone living alone who was 65 years of age or older. The average household size was 2.82 and the average family size was 3.24.

26.6% of the population were under the age of 18, 5.7% from 18 to 24, 19.1% from 25 to 44, 32.7% from 45 to 64, and 15.9% who were 65 years of age or older. The median age was 44.2 years. For every 100 females, the population had 93.6 males. For every 100 females ages 18 and older there were 89.3 males.

The Census Bureau's 2006–2010 American Community Survey showed that (in 2010 inflation-adjusted dollars) median household income was $120,820 (with a margin of error of +/− $7,009) and the median family income was $135,612 (+/− $8,972). Males had a median income of $100,594 (+/− $8,458) versus $61,516 (+/− $11,658) for females. The per capita income for the township was $49,586 (+/− $4,018). About 0.7% of families and 2.1% of the population were below the poverty line, including 3.4% of those under age 18 and 2.4% of those age 65 or over.

Same-sex couples headed 23 households in 2010, an increase from the 9 counted in 2000.

=== 2000 census ===
As of the 2000 United States census there were 9,449 people, 3,275 households, and 2,675 families residing in the township. The population density was 2,317.7 inhabitants per square mile (894.9/km^{2}). There were 3,312 housing units at an average density of 812.4 per square mile (313.7/km^{2}). The racial makeup of the township was 92.33% White, 0.58% African American, 5.89% Asian, 0.02% Pacific Islander, 0.43% from other races, and 0.74% from two or more races. Hispanic or Latino of any race were 3.22% of the population.

There were 3,275 households, out of which 40.7% had children under the age of 18 living with them, 74.1% were married couples living together, 6.0% had a female householder with no husband present, and 18.3% were non-families. 15.4% of all households were made up of individuals, and 7.8% had someone living alone who was 65 years of age or older. The average household size was 2.87 and the average family size was 3.22.

In the township the population was spread out, with 27.2% under the age of 18, 4.8% from 18 to 24, 26.5% from 25 to 44, 28.1% from 45 to 64, and 13.4% who were 65 years of age or older. The median age was 40 years. For every 100 females, there were 93.3 males. For every 100 females age 18 and over, there were 89.9 males.

The median income for a household in the township was $95,129, and the median income for a family was $105,919. Males had a median income of $77,794 versus $39,732 for females. The per capita income for the township was $40,709. 2.8% of the population and 2.4% of families were below the poverty line. Out of the total population, 2.1% of those under the age of 18 and 5.3% of those 65 and older were living below the poverty line.

== Government ==
=== Local government ===
River Vale is governed within the Faulkner Act (formally known as the Optional Municipal Charter Law) under the Mayor-Council system of municipal government (Plan E), implemented by direct petition as of January 1, 1979. The township is one of 71 municipalities (of the 564) statewide that use this form of government. The governing body is composed of two separate and coequal power centers, each directly elected by voters, with the Mayor serving as Chief Executive, while the Council is the municipal legislature. The Township Council has five members elected at-large to four-year staggered terms on a partisan basis, with either two seats (plus the mayor) or three seats coming up for vote in even-numbered years as part of the November general election.

As of 2023, the Mayor of River Vale is Republican Mark Bromberg, whose term of office ends December 31, 2026. The members of the Township Council are Council President Paul J. Criscuolo (R, 2024), Vice President Denise E. Sieg (D, 2026), Ari Ben-Yishay (R, 2024), John Donovan (R, 2024) and James Tolomeo Jr. (R, 2026).

In February 2014, the Township Council selected John Donovan from among a list of three candidates nominated by the Republican municipal committee to fill the vacancy of Noel Matos, who resigned from office in the previous month due to work commitments.

=== Federal, state and county representation ===
River Vale is located in the 5th Congressional District and is part of New Jersey's 39th state legislative district.

For the 119th United States Congress, New Jersey's 5th congressional district is represented by Josh Gottheimer (D, Wyckoff). New Jersey is represented in the United States Senate by Democrats Cory Booker (Newark, term ends 2027) and Andy Kim (Moorestown, term ends 2031).

For the 2026–2027 session, the 39th legislative district of the New Jersey Legislature is represented in the State Senate by Holly Schepisi (R, River Vale) and in the General Assembly by Robert Auth (R, Old Tappan) and John V. Azzariti (R, Saddle River).

Bergen County is governed by a directly elected County Executive, with legislative functions performed by a Board of County Commissioners comprised of seven members who are elected at-large to three-year terms in partisan elections on a staggered basis, with either two or three seats coming up for election each November; a Chairman and Vice Chairman are selected from among its seven members at a reorganization meeting held every January. As of 2025, the county executive is James J. Tedesco III (D, Paramus), whose four-year term of office ends December 31, 2026.

Bergen County's Commissioners are Chair Mary J. Amoroso (D, Mahwah, 2025), Vice Chair Steven A. Tanelli (D, North Arlington, 2027), Chair Pro Tem Joan Voss (D, Fort Lee, 2026), Rafael Marte (D, Bergenfield, 2026), Germaine M. Ortiz (D, Emerson, 2025), Thomas J. Sullivan Jr. (D, Montvale, 2025) and Tracy Silna Zur (D, Franklin Lakes, 2027).

Bergen County's elected constitutional officials are Clerk John S. Hogan (D, Northvale, 2026), Sheriff Anthony Cureton (D, Englewood, 2027) and Surrogate Michael R. Dressler (D, Cresskill, 2026).

=== Politics ===
United States presidential election results for River Vale 2024 2020 2016 2012 2008 2004
Year	Republican		Democratic		Third party(ies)	
Year	No.	%	No.	%	No.	%
2024	3,290	50.69%	3,104	47.83%	96	1.48%
2020	3,240	47.40%	3,506	51.29%	89	1.30%
2016	2,904	51.12%	2,609	45.93%	168	2.96%
2012	2,962	55.91%	2,303	43.47%	33	0.62%
2008	2,963	53.63%	2,529	45.77%	33	0.60%
2004	2,946	54.57%	2,424	44.90%	29	0.54%

As of March 2011, there were a total of 6,881 registered voters in River Vale Township, of which 1,607 (23.4% vs. 31.7% countywide) were registered as Democrats, 1,889 (27.5% vs. 21.1%) were registered as Republicans and 3,381 (49.1% vs. 47.1%) were registered as Unaffiliated. There were 4 voters registered as Libertarians or Greens. Among the township's 2010 Census population, 71.2% (vs. 57.1% in Bergen County) were registered to vote, including 97.1% of those ages 18 and over (vs. 73.7% countywide).

In the 2016 presidential election, Republican Donald Trump received 2,904 votes (50.2% vs. 41.6% countywide), ahead of Democrat Hillary Clinton with 2,609 votes (45.1% vs. 54.8%) and other candidates with 202 votes (3.5% vs. 3.0%), among the 5,781 ballots cast by the township's 7,704 registered voters, for a turnout of 75.0% (vs. 72.5% in Bergen County). In the 2012 presidential election, Republican Mitt Romney received 2,962 votes (55.6% vs. 43.5% countywide), ahead of Democrat Barack Obama with 2,303 votes (43.2% vs. 54.8%) and other candidates with 33 votes (0.6% vs. 0.9%), among the 5,330 ballots cast by the township's 7,189 registered voters, for a turnout of 74.1% (vs. 70.4% in Bergen County). In the 2008 presidential election, Republican John McCain received 2,963 votes (53.2% vs. 44.5% countywide), ahead of Democrat Barack Obama with 2,529 votes (45.4% vs. 53.9%) and other candidates with 33 votes (0.6% vs. 0.8%), among the 5,573 ballots cast by the township's 7,088 registered voters, for a turnout of 78.6% (vs. 76.8% in Bergen County).

Gubernatorial election results for River Vale
Year	Republican		Democratic		Third party(ies)	
Year	No.	%	No.	%	No.	%
2025	2,688	51.41%	2,533	48.44%	8	0.15%
2021	2,307	53.51%	1,990	46.16%	14	0.32%
2017	1,577	52.43%	1,391	46.24%	40	1.33%
2013	2,067	68.29%	922	30.46%	38	1.26%
2009	2,017	56.47%	1,369	38.33%	186	5.21%
2005	1,736	51.54%	1,569	46.59%	63	1.87%

In the 2013 gubernatorial election, Republican Chris Christie received 68.3% of the vote (2,067 cast), ahead of Democrat Barbara Buono with 30.5% (922 votes), and other candidates with 1.3% (38 votes), among the 3,083 ballots cast by the township's 7,027 registered voters (56 ballots were spoiled), for a turnout of 43.9%. In the 2009 gubernatorial election, Republican Chris Christie received 2,017 votes (56.0% vs. 45.8% countywide), ahead of Democrat Jon Corzine with 1,369 votes (38.0% vs. 48.0%), Independent Chris Daggett with 174 votes (4.8% vs. 4.7%) and other candidates with 12 votes (0.3% vs. 0.5%), among the 3,604 ballots cast by the township's 7,009 registered voters, yielding a 51.4% turnout (vs. 50.0% in the county).

United States Senate election results for River Vale1
Year	Republican		Democratic		Third party(ies)	
Year	No.	%	No.	%	No.	%
2024	3,049	49.84%	2,979	48.70%	89	1.45%
2018	2,222	53.52%	1,828	44.03%	102	2.46%
2012	2,641	54.38%	2,158	44.43%	58	1.19%
2006	2,120	55.53%	1,652	43.27%	46	1.20%

United States Senate election results for River Vale2
Year	Republican		Democratic		Third party(ies)	
Year	No.	%	No.	%	No.	%
2020	3,262	48.64%	3,365	50.17%	80	1.19%
2014	1,480	51.68%	1,359	47.45%	25	0.87%
2013	1,049	50.87%	995	48.25%	18	0.87%
2008	2,629	52.67%	2,310	46.28%	52	1.04%

== Emergency services ==
=== Police ===
The River Vale Police Department is a full-time department that has provided police services to the township since 1930. As of 2015, there were a total of 21 members of the department: one Chief, two Lieutenants, five Sergeants, 11 Officers, and one Dispatcher.

The force is responsible for all aspects of policing in the township, including responding to fire and medical emergency calls. Each patrol car is equipped with a first aid kit, oxygen tank, and an Automated external defibrillator.

Dispatch for all River Vale emergency services (police, fire, ambulance) is contracted to Ridgewood, New Jersey based Northwest Central Bergen Dispatch (NWBCD).

Officers of the River Vale Police Department are members of Pascack Valley Local 206 of the New Jersey State Policemen's Benevolent Association.

=== Fire ===
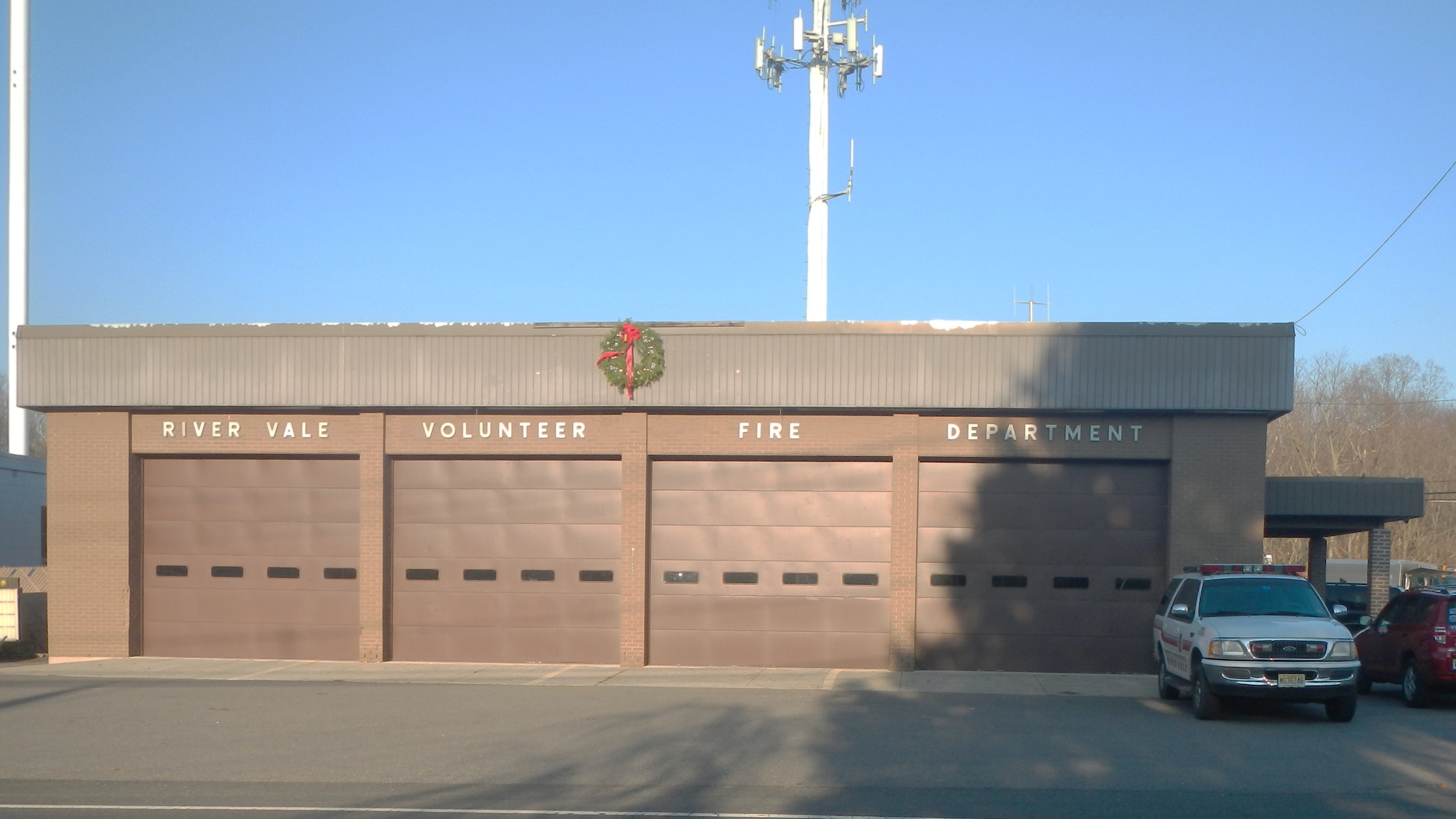
South firehouse

The River Vale Volunteer Fire Department (RVFD) is an all-volunteer fire department. Started in 1923, the department consists of one Chief, one Assistant/Deputy Chief, two Captains, and five Lieutenants (one for each apparatus). In addition, there is also a Fire Official who is in charge of the River Vale Bureau of Fire Prevention with 2 Fire Inspectors under his direction. The department is staffed by fully trained firefighters, junior firefighters, and fire police. The RVFD is a municipal-run public volunteer fire department that is funded by taxes. It is a member of the Pascack Valley mutual aid. In December 2021, the council removed the Fire Chief on charges of insubordination.

The department has two stations. The North Firehouse is located at 620 Rivervale Road, and houses one pumper, Engine 56 and the Fire Prevention Bureau. The South Firehouse is located at 334 Rivervale Road, and houses two pumpers, Engines 57 and 58, one tower ladder, Ladder 59, and one rescue unit, Rescue 54, and one rescue boat, Marine 5. There is also a fire command vehicle for the Chief, a vehicle for the Assistant Chief, both Ford Explorers and known as 55 and 551 respectively, and two vehicles for the Fire Prevention Bureau. Dispatching is contracted to Ridgewood, New Jersey based Northwest Central Bergen Dispatch (NWBCD).

=== Ambulance ===
Begun in 1956, and formally incorporated in 1957, the River Vale Volunteer Ambulance Corps, Inc. (RVVAC) is located at 333 Rivervale Road. The corps is run by an executive board, consisting of the business officers and the line officers. The business officers are the President, Vice President, Secretary, and Treasurer, and the line officers are the Captain, 1st Lieutenant, and 2nd Lieutenant. The RVVAC is an all-volunteer independent public emergency medical service. As such, they do not bill for services, and their equipment is not directly paid for by the township. Funding is provided by donations and support from the township.

The corps provides basic life support, and is staffed primarily by certified Emergency Medical Technicians. CPR-trained drivers are also sometimes on duty. They have two Type III ambulances, Ambulance 50 and Ambulance 60, and three first responder vehicles that on-duty members use to respond to emergency calls. Dispatching is provided by the River Vale Police Department's 9-1-1 center.

The primary jurisdiction of the RVVAC is the Township of River Vale, but the corps also regularly responds to requests for mutual-aid from the neighboring First Aid Squads of Old Tappan, Emerson, Washington Township, Westwood, Hillsdale, and Tri-Boro (Park Ridge, Woodcliff Lake, and Montvale).

The RVVAC is a member of the New Jersey State First Aid Council, the Pascack Valley Volunteer Ambulance Association and the Pascack Valley Mutual Aid Group.

== Education ==
The River Vale Public Schools serve students in pre-kindergarten through eighth grade. As of the 2020–21 school year, the district, comprised of three schools, had an enrollment of 1,073 students and 94.2 classroom teachers (on an FTE basis), for a student–teacher ratio of 11.4:1. Schools in the district (with 2020–21 enrollment data from the National Center for Education Statistics) are Roberge Elementary School with 302 students in pre-kindergarten to fifth grade, Woodside Elementary School with 342 students in kindergarten to fifth grade and Holdrum Middle School with 413 students in grades sixth to eighth.

River Vale's public high school students attend Pascack Valley High School in Hillsdale, together with students from Hillsdale, as part of the Pascack Valley Regional High School District. As of the 2020–21 school year, the high school had an enrollment of 1,087 students and 93.2 classroom teachers (on an FTE basis), for a student–teacher ratio of 11.7:1. Seats on the high school district's board of education are allocated based on the population of the constituent districts, with one seat assigned to River Vale.

Public school students from the township, and all of Bergen County, are eligible to attend the secondary education programs offered by the Bergen County Technical Schools, which include the Bergen County Academies in Hackensack, and the Bergen Tech campus in Teterboro or Paramus. The district offers programs on a shared-time or full-time basis, with admission based on a selective application process and tuition covered by the student's home school district.

== Transportation ==
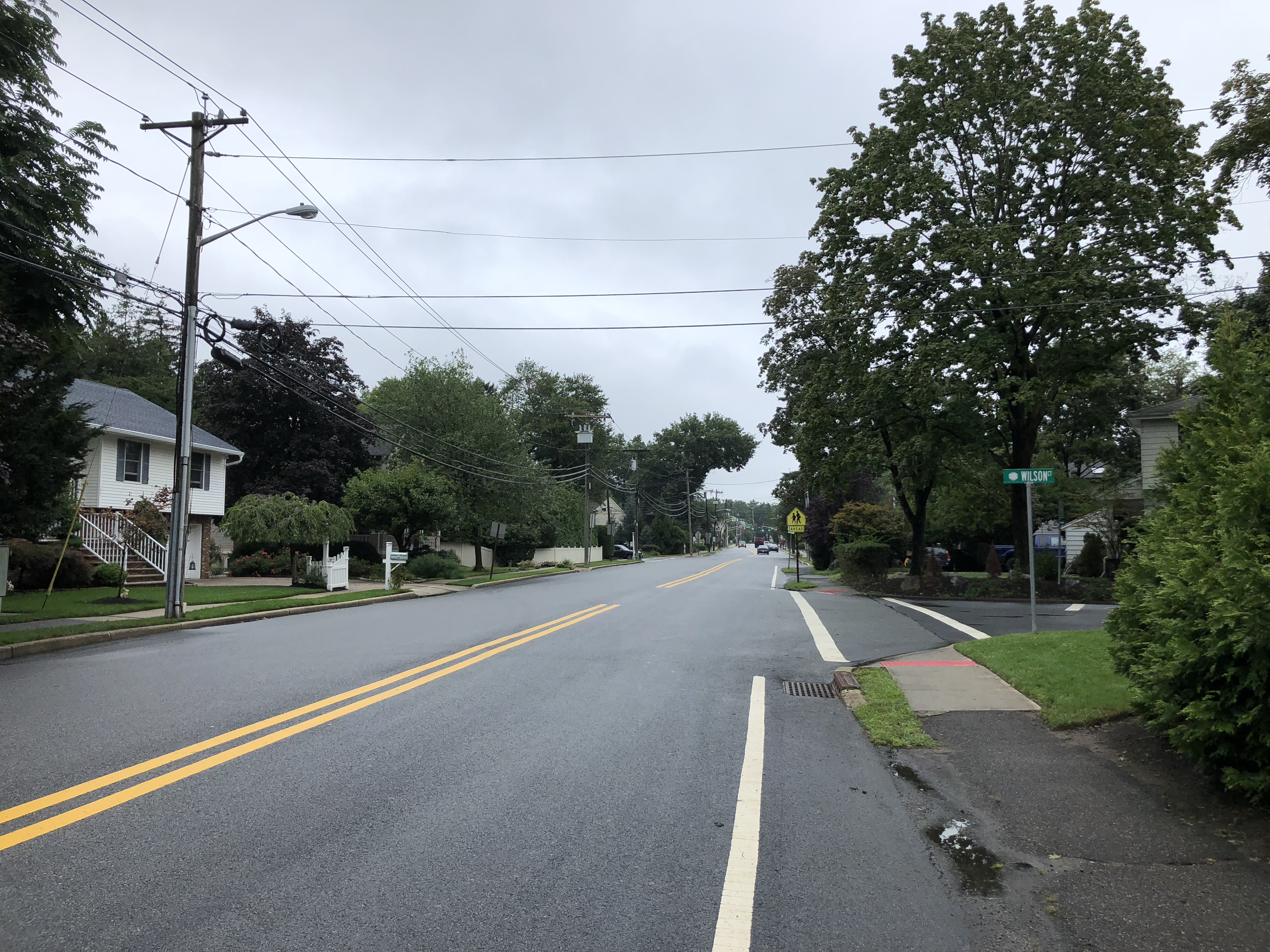
County Route 53 (Rivervale Road) in River Vale

=== Roads and highways ===
As of May 2010, the township had a total of 47.34 miles (76.19 km) of roadways, of which 37.66 miles (60.61 km) were maintained by the municipality and 9.68 miles (15.58 km) by Bergen County.

Main roads in River Vale include Westwood Avenue, Rivervale Road and Prospect Avenue.

=== Public transportation ===
Daily bus service is provided by Rockland Coaches (Red and Tan Lines) on routes 84 and 14K to the George Washington Bridge Bus Station and on route 14ET to the Port Authority Bus Terminal in Midtown Manhattan.

While there is no rail transport in River Vale, the NJ Transit Pascack Valley Line is available in adjacent communities to the west. Daily service is available to Hoboken and Secaucus Junction from the Montvale, Park Ridge, Woodcliff Lake, Hillsdale and Westwood stations.

== Notable people ==
People who were born in, residents of, or otherwise closely associated with River Vale include:

- Brooke Ammerman (born 1990), ice hockey forward who was the first player to score a goal in Metropolitan Riveters history
- Mike Bajakian (born 1974), Tampa Bay Buccaneers quarterbacks coach, former offensive coordinator for the Tennessee Volunteers football team
- John Campbell (born 1955), harness racing driver and youngest ever person inducted into the Harness Racing Hall of Fame
- Richard Cottingham (born 1946), serial-killer also known as "the torso-killer", who is believed to have murdered 11 people and claimed to have killed 85–100
- Jack Curry, analyst on the New York Yankees pre and postgame shows on the YES Network
- Chris Eliopoulos (born 1967), cartoonist
- Peter Enns (born 1961), author, former professor of Old Testament and hermeneutics at Westminster Theological Seminary
- Arthur Feuerstein (1935–2022), national chess champion
- Dan Fogelman (born 1976), Hollywood screenwriter
- Stewart Krentzman (born 1951), former President and Chief Executive Officer of Oki Data Americas, Inc.
- Florence Lawrence (1886–1938), the first ever "movie star", she lived in River Vale from 1913 through 1916
- Michelle Lewis (born 1971/72), singer-songwriter.
- Bill Maher (born 1956), comedian and actor
- Daniel S. Nevins (born 1966), rabbi who is Dean at the Jewish Theological Seminary of America
- Ian O'Connor (born 1964), sports columnist and ESPN radio host who wrote the books Arnie & Jack: Palmer, Nicklaus & Golf's Greatest Rivalry and The Captain: The Journey of Derek Jeter
- Annette Sanders (born 1937/38), jazz vocalist and studio singer
- Holly Schepisi (born 1971), member of the New Jersey General Assembly who has represented the 39th Legislative District since 2012
- Celita Schutz (born 1968), judoka who competed on the women's team in the 1996 Summer Olympics, in the 2000 Summer Olympics and in the 2004 Summer Olympics
- William J. Snow, (1868–1947), major general in the United States Army
- Harry Solter (1873–1920), silent film actor, screenwriter and director

== Historical sites ==
- Baylor Massacre Burial Site, site of the 1778 American Revolutionary War battle.
- River Vale's Veterans Memorial is home to the sixteen-foot, one-ton nameplate from the stern of USS Enterprise.

== Other points of interest ==
- River Vale Country Club has an 18-hole golf course that is open to the public.

== Sources ==
- Municipal Incorporations of the State of New Jersey (according to Counties) prepared by the Division of Local Government, Department of the Treasury (New Jersey); December 1, 1958.
- Clayton, W. Woodford; and Nelson, William. History of Bergen and Passaic Counties, New Jersey, with Biographical Sketches of Many of its Pioneers and Prominent Men., Philadelphia: Everts and Peck, 1882.
- Harvey, Cornelius Burnham (ed.), Genealogical History of Hudson and Bergen Counties, New Jersey. New York: New Jersey Genealogical Publishing Co., 1900.
- Moderacki, Edmund. River Vale (Images of America series), Arcadia Publishing, 2002. ISBN 0-7385-1080-7
- Van Valen, James M. History of Bergen County, New Jersey. New York: New Jersey Publishing and Engraving Co., 1900.
- Westervelt, Frances A. (Frances Augusta), 1858–1942, History of Bergen County, New Jersey, 1630–1923, Lewis Historical Publishing Company, 1923.
