= Park Ridge station (NJ Transit) =

NJ Transit rail station

Park Ridge
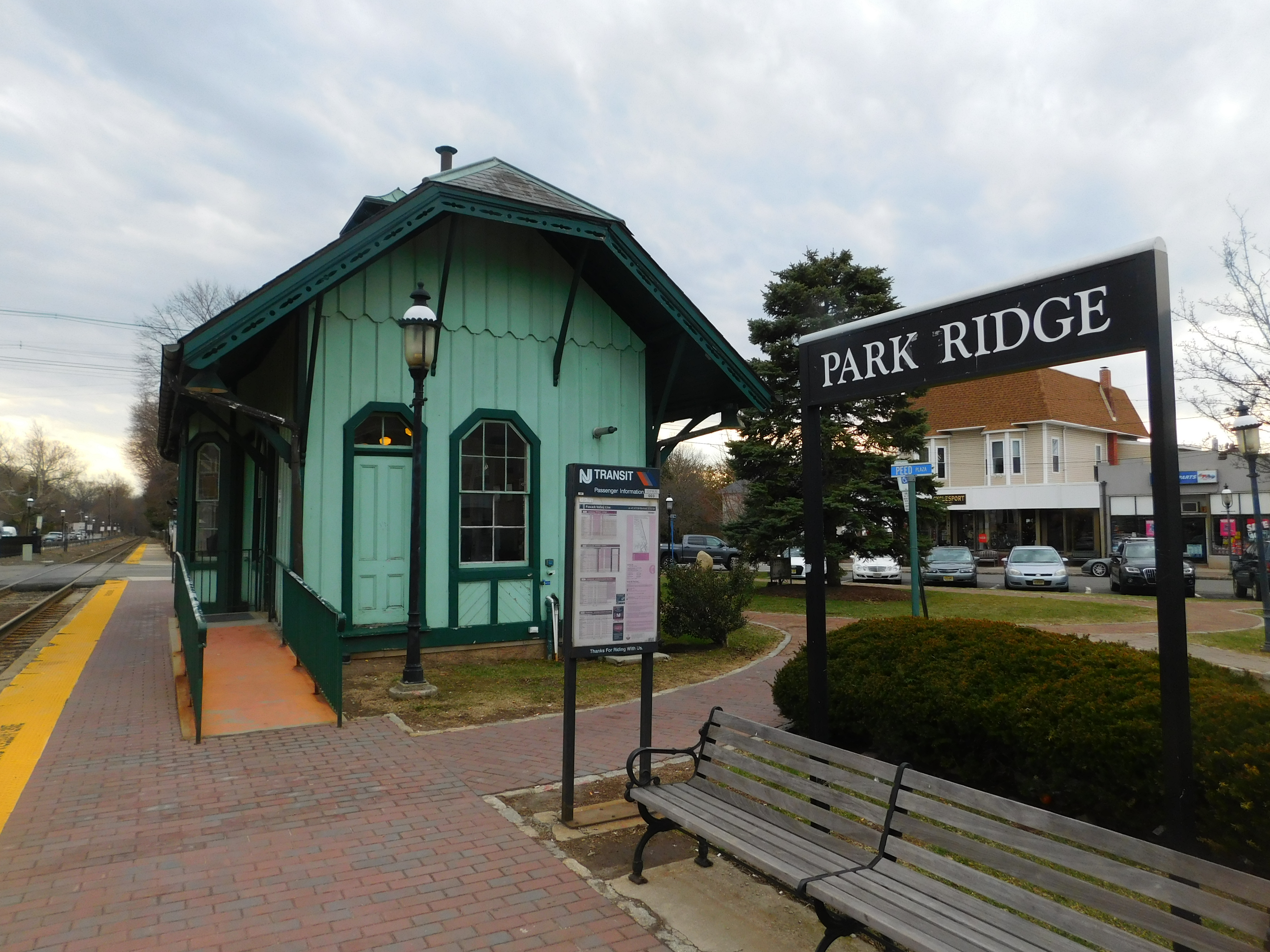
- Park Ridge station in April 2018.

General information
- Location: Main Street at Hawthorne Avenue, Park Ridge, Bergen County, New Jersey 07656
- Coordinates: 41.0329°N 74.0357°W
- Owner: New Jersey Transit
- Platforms: 1 side platform
- Tracks: 1
- Connections: Rockland Coaches: 11 (on Kinderkamack Road)

Construction
- Parking: Yes (permit required)
- Cycle facilities: Yes
- Accessible: No

Other information
- Station code: 795 (Erie Railroad)
- Fare zone: 10

History
- Opened: May 27, 1871

Passengers
- 2025: 149 (average weekday)
- Rank: 107 of 153

Services
| Preceding station | NJ Transit | Following station |
|---|---|---|
| Montvale toward Spring Valley | Pascack Valley Line | Woodcliff Lake toward Hoboken |
Former services
| Preceding station | Erie Railroad | Following station |
|---|---|---|
| Montvale toward Haverstraw | New Jersey and New York Railroad | Woodcliff Lake toward Jersey City |
- Park Ridge Station
- U.S. National Register of Historic Places
- New Jersey Register of Historic Places
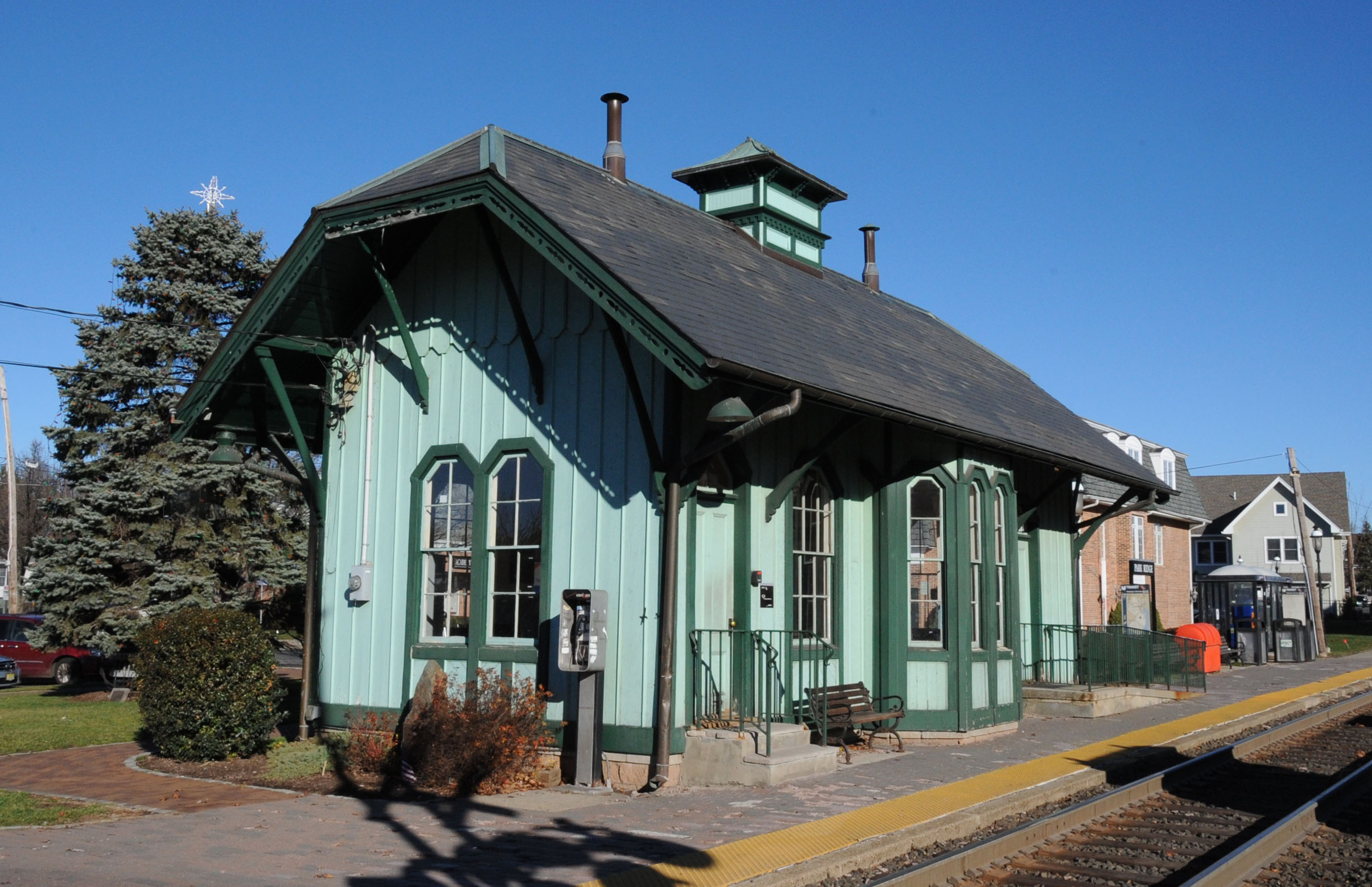
- The former Erie Railroad station depot at Park Ridge.
- Location: Hawthorne and Park Avenue, Park Ridge, New Jersey
- Coordinates: 41°1′58″N 74°2′11″W
- Area: 0.3 acres (0.1 ha)
- Built: 1872
- Architectural style: Carpenter Gothic
- MPS: Operating Passenger Railroad Stations TR
- NRHP reference No.: 84002577
- NJRHP No.: 627

Significant dates
- Added to NRHP: June 22, 1984
- Designated NJRHP: March 17, 1984
Location

Park Ridge is an active commuter railroad station in the borough of Park Ridge, Bergen County, New Jersey. Located at the intersection of Park and Hawthorne Avenues, the station services trains on the Pascack Valley Line, which runs from Hoboken Terminal to Spring Valley station in New York. The station contains a single low-level side platform split by Park Avenue (County Route 92) and a wooden station depot, built by the Hackensack and New York Extension Railroad. As a result, Park Ridge station is not handicap accessible under the Americans with Disabilities Act of 1990.

Railroad service through Park Ridge began on May 27, 1871 with the final extension of the Hackensack and New York Extension Railroad from Hillsdale station in New Jersey to the junction with the Erie Railroad Piermont Branch at Nanuet. However, in order to establish a stop in Park Ridge, the railroad requested Washington Township residents fund the construction of a new depot.

== History ==
The station house has been listed in the state and federal registers of historic places since 1984 and is part of the Operating Passenger Railroad Stations Thematic Resource.

== Station layout ==
The station has one track and one low-level side platform.

Permit parking is operated by the Borough of Park Ridge. There are two permit parking lots available, with 100 and 34 parking spots, respectively.

== See also ==
- List of New Jersey Transit stations
- National Register of Historic Places listings in Bergen County, New Jersey
