= Montvale station =

NJ Transit rail station

Montvale
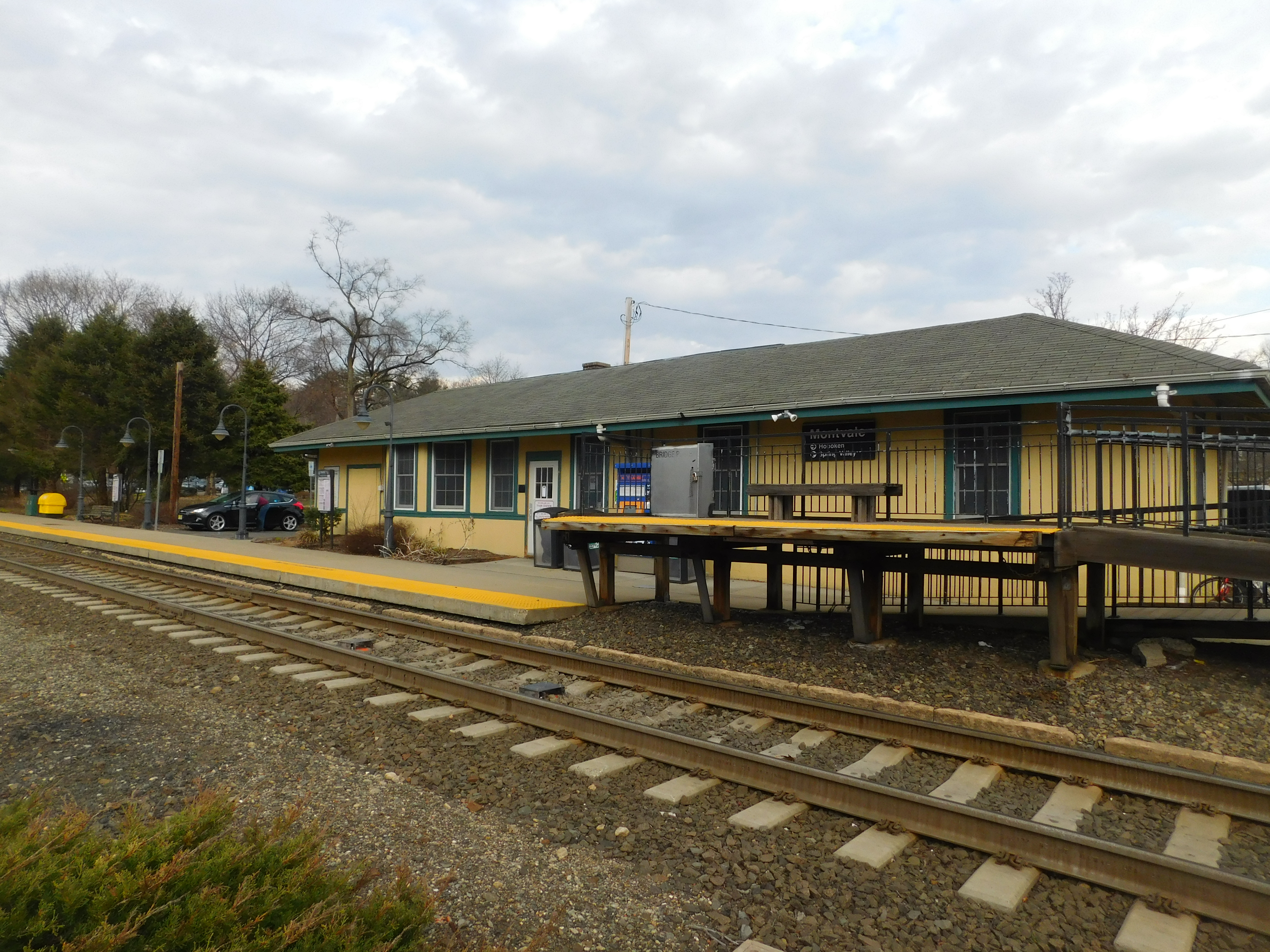
- Montvale station as seen from Railroad Avenue at the station depot and mini-high level platform.

General information
- Location: East Grand Avenue (CR 94) between Railroad Avenue and Kinderkamack Road (CR 503), Montvale, New Jersey
- Coordinates: 41.0405°N 74.0292°W
- Owner: New Jersey Transit
- Platforms: 1 side platform
- Tracks: 1
- Connections: Rockland Coaches: 11

Construction
- Parking: Yes (permit required)
- Cycle facilities: Yes
- Accessible: Yes

Other information
- Station code: 797 (Erie Railroad)
- Fare zone: 10

History
- Opened: May 27, 1871

Key dates
- October 11, 1921: Station depot exploded

Passengers
- 2025: 121 (average weekday)
- Rank: 113 of 153

Services
Preceding station	NJ Transit	Following station
Pearl River toward Spring Valley	Pascack Valley Line	Park Ridge toward Hoboken
Former services
Preceding station	Erie Railroad	Following station
Pearl River toward Haverstraw	New Jersey and New York Railroad	Park Ridge toward Jersey City
Location

Montvale is an active commuter railroad station in the borough of Montvale, Bergen County, New Jersey. Located in the middle of an active road junction of East Grand Avenue (County Route 94) and Kinderkamack Road (County Route 503), the station serves trains on New Jersey Transit's Pascack Valley Line, serving as the first/last stop in New Jersey. The station consists of one low-level side platform with a mini-high-level platform to service handicapped customers under the Americans with Disabilities Act of 1990.

== History ==
Railroad service in Montvale began on May 27, 1871, when railroad service from Hillsdale was extended to the junction with the Erie Railroad Piermont Branch at Nanuet on the Hackensack and New York Extension Railroad. The original station depot at Montvale exploded on October 11, 1921 when a local pyrotechnic lit the station and a nearby real estate office on fire that morning, resulting in complete demolition of the building.

== Station layout ==
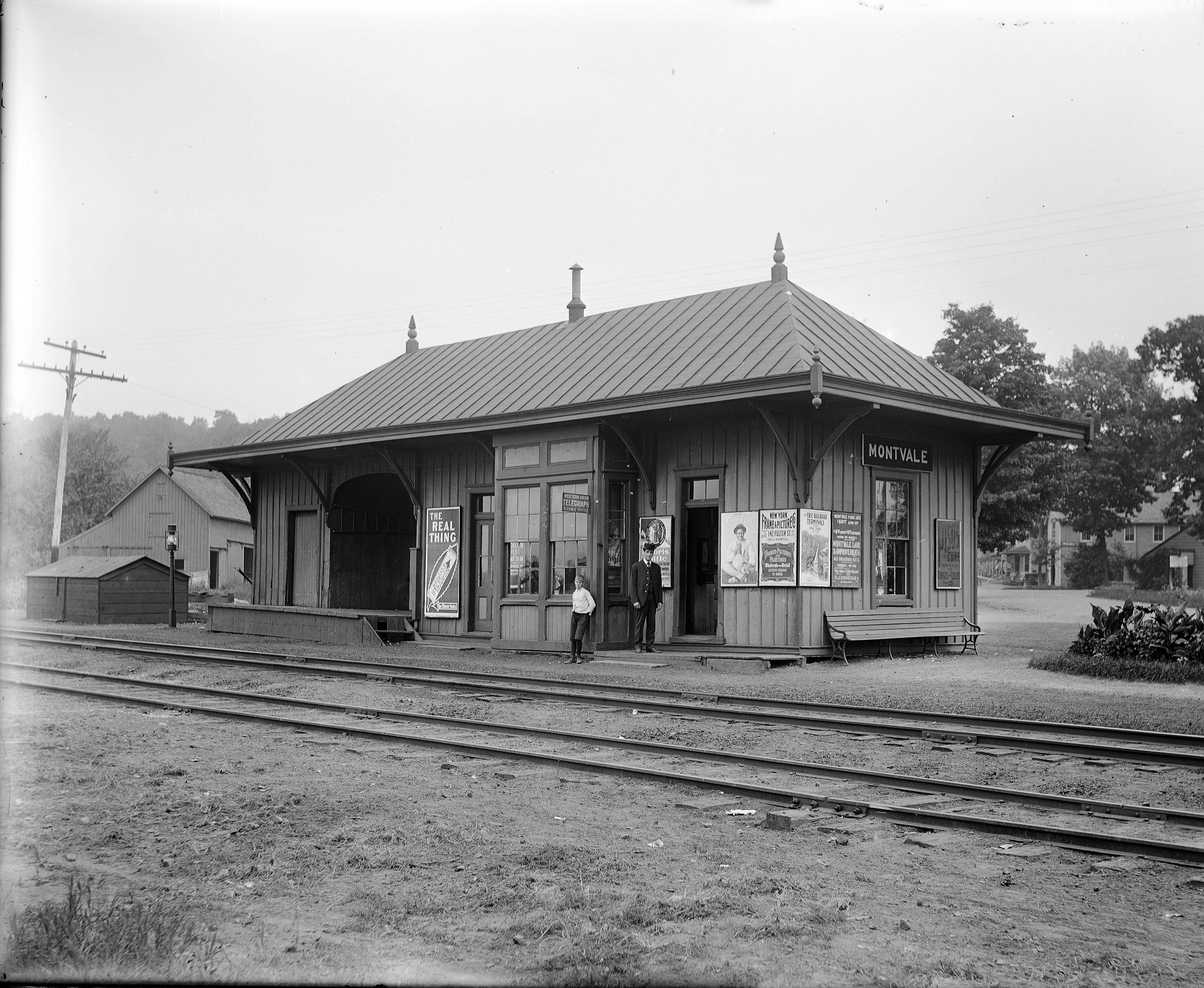
The former station depot at Montvale c. 1907–1912

The station has one track and one low-level side platform.

Permit parking is operated by the Borough of Montvale. There are three permit parking lots available, with 60, 11 and 139 parking spots, respectively.
