= Pearl River station =

NJ Transit and Metro-North Railroad station

Pearl River
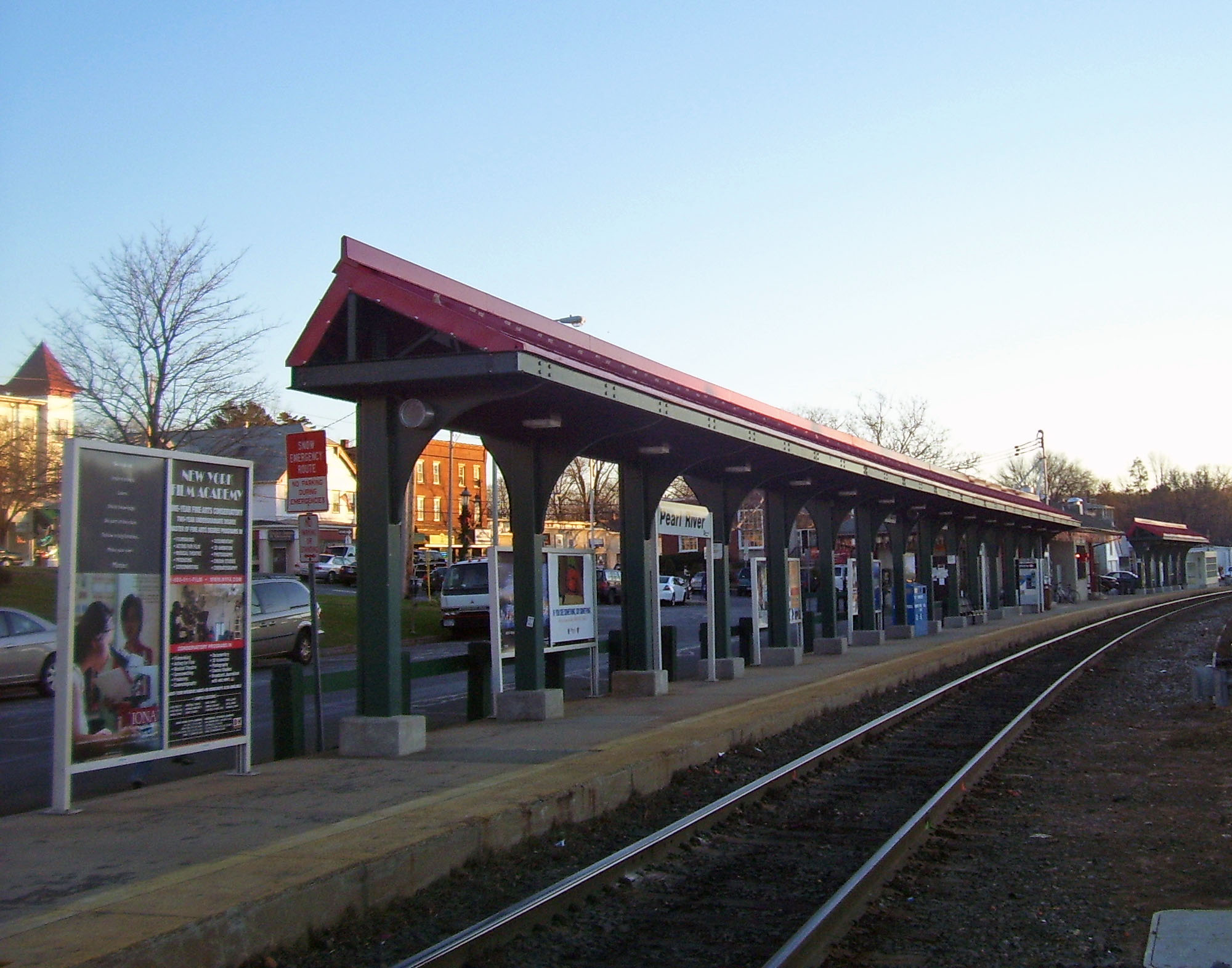
- Pearl River station platform

General information
- Location: 35 South Main Street; Pearl River, New York
- Coordinates: 41°03′29″N 74°01′20″W
- Owner: NJ Transit
- Operator: Metro-North Railroad
- Platforms: 1 side platform
- Tracks: 1
- Connections: Transport of Rockland: 92

Construction
- Structure type: At-grade
- Parking: 357 spaces
- Accessible: No

Other information
- Station code: 801 (Erie Railroad)

History
- Opened: May 27, 1871

Key dates
- 1981: Station agency closed

Services
Preceding station	NJ Transit	Following station
Nanuet toward Spring Valley	Pascack Valley Line	Montvale toward Hoboken
Former services
Preceding station	Erie Railroad	Following station
Nanuet toward Haverstraw	New Jersey and New York Railroad	Montvale toward Jersey City
Location

Pearl River station is an active commuter railroad station in the hamlet of Pearl River, located in the town of Orangetown, Rockland County, New York. Located at Station Plaza between South Main Street and Railroad Avenue, Pearl River station serves trains of Metro-North Railroad's Pascack Valley Line, operated under contract by NJ Transit between Spring Valley station in the eponymous Spring Valley, New York to Hoboken Terminal in Hoboken, New Jersey, where connection is available to Manhattan. Pearl River is a single low-level side platform station, with no accessibility for the handicapped. The station has a 351-space parking lot at Jefferson Avenue. The Erie Railroad-built station depot at Pearl River currently serves as a restaurant.

Railroad service in what is now Pearl River began on May 27, 1871 with the opening of the Hackensack and New York Extension Railroad from Hillsdale, New Jersey to nearby Nanuet, where connection was made with the Erie Railroad's Piermont Branch.

== History ==
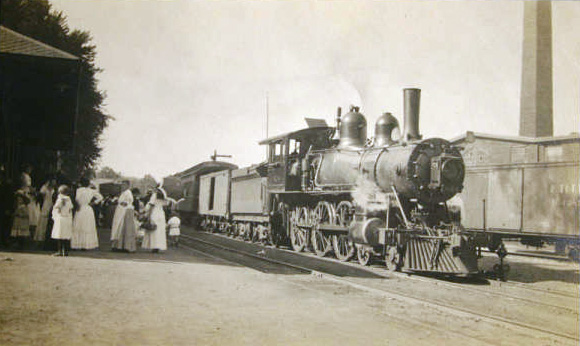
Pearl River station in 1910

The land donated for the station came from Julius Braunsdorf, a local entrepreneur, who won a lawsuit against the Singer Corporation. Braunsdorf opened Central Avenue, the local post office, and the railroad station. Known as Muddy Brook, Braunsdorf suggested the hamlet be renamed for the pearls in the local river. Braunsdorf built originally two facilities at Pearl River, but some time after 1880, these were merged into one structure.

== Station layout ==
The station has one track and one low-level side platform.

Like many Metro-North stations east of the Hudson, permit parking is operated by LAZ Parking. Pearl River's parking lot accommodates 170 vehicles.

== Bibliography ==
- Cassetta, James Vincent (2014). Images of America: Pearl River. Arcadia Publishing. ISBN 978-1-4671-2155-2.
