= Woodcliff Lake station =

NJ Transit rail station

Woodcliff Lake
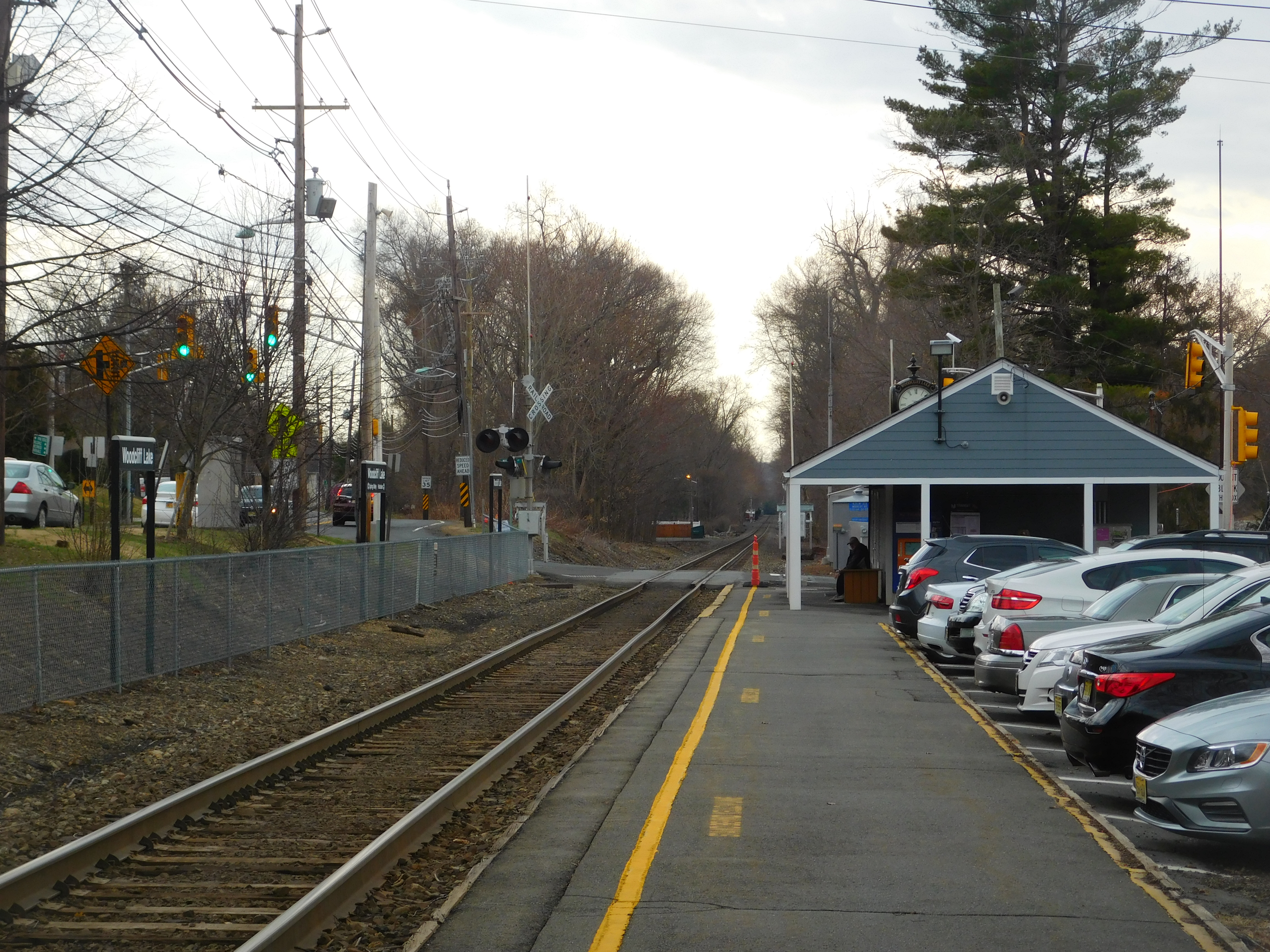
- Woodcliff Lake station facing southbound along the tracks in April 2018 after restoration.

General information
- Location: Woodcliff Avenue at Broadway; Woodcliff Lake, New Jersey
- Coordinates: 41.0211°N 74.0408°W
- Owner: New Jersey Transit
- Platforms: 1 side platform
- Tracks: 1

Construction
- Parking: Yes (permit required)
- Cycle facilities: Yes
- Accessible: no

Other information
- Station code: 793 (Erie Railroad)
- Fare zone: 10

History
- Opened: May 27, 1871

Key dates
- December 1960: Original station razed

Passengers
- 2025: 84 (average weekday)
- Rank: 125 of 153

Services
Preceding station	NJ Transit	Following station
Park Ridge toward Spring Valley	Pascack Valley Line	Hillsdale toward Hoboken
Former services
Preceding station	Erie Railroad	Following station
Park Ridge toward Haverstraw	New Jersey and New York Railroad	Hillsdale toward Jersey City
Park Ridge toward Haverstraw	New Jersey and New York Railroad until 1940s	Hillsdale Manor toward Jersey City
Location

Woodcliff Lake is an active commuter railroad station in the borough of Woodcliff Lake, Bergen County, New Jersey. Located at the junction of Woodcliff Avenue (County Route 90) and Broadway (County Route 104) on the edge of the Woodcliff Lake Reservoir, the station is served by trains of New Jersey Transit's Pascack Valley Line. The station, which contains a single track and low-level side platform, is not accessible per handicapped persons under the Americans with Disabilities Act of 1990. As of November 8, 2020, Woodcliff Lake is serviced seven days a week by New Jersey Transit trains, having previously only been a single train on weekends and holidays up to that point.

== History ==
Railroad service through Woodcliff Lake began on May 27, 1871 when the Hackensack and New York Extension Railroad introduced service north from Hillsdale to Nanuet, New York. At that time, a station in the area was known as Pascack. The former station depot at Woodcliff Lake, in deplorable condition for multiple years attached to the existing depot, came down in December 1960 to be replaced by a police station outpost and improved parking for commuters.

== Station layout ==
The station has one track and one low-level side platform.

Permit parking is operated by the Borough of Woodcliff Lake. A single permit parking lot, with 60 parking spots is available.
