= Nanuet station =

NJ Transit and Metro-North Railroad station

Nanuet
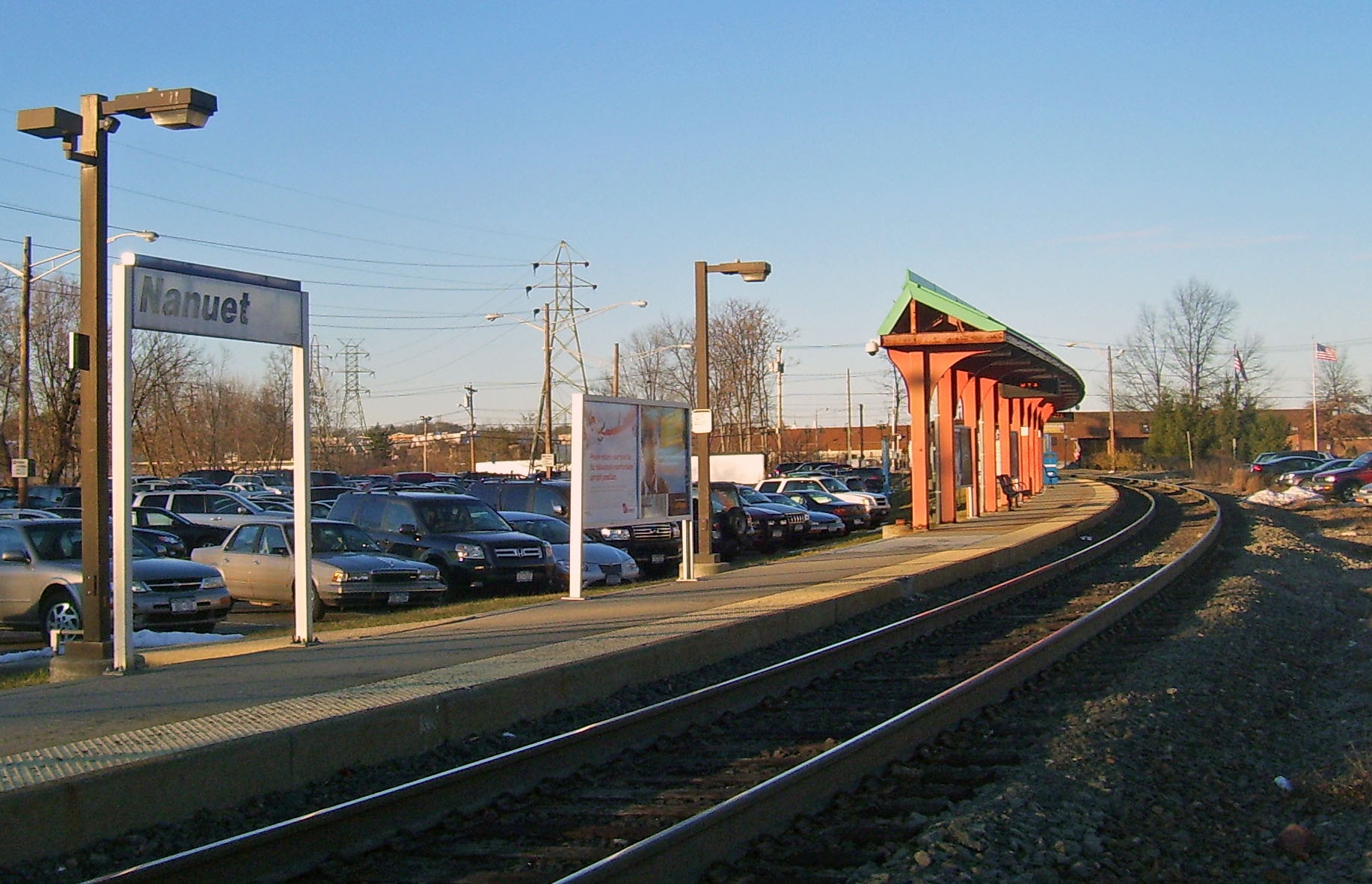
- Nanuet station platform

General information
- Location: 25 Prospect Street; Nanuet, New York
- Coordinates: 41°05′25″N 74°00′53″W
- Owner: NJ Transit
- Operator: Metro-North Railroad
- Platforms: 1 side platform
- Tracks: 1
- Connections: Transport of Rockland: 59, 93; Rockland Coaches: 11

Construction
- Structure type: At-grade
- Parking: 126 spaces
- Accessible: Yes

Other information
- Station code: 805 (Erie Railroad)

History
- Opened: June 30, 1841
- Rebuilt: 1849
- Former names: Red Tavern (1841–1849); Clarkstown (1849–1856)

Key dates
- 1964: Station agency closed
- 1991: Station depot burned

Services
Preceding station	NJ Transit	Following station
Spring Valley Terminus	Pascack Valley Line	Pearl River toward Hoboken
Former services
Preceding station	Erie Railroad	Following station
Spring Valley toward Haverstraw	New Jersey and New York Railroad	Pearl River toward Jersey City
Spring Valley toward Suffern	Piermont Branch	Blauvelt toward Sparkill
Bardonia toward New City	New City Branch	Terminus
Location

Nanuet station is an active commuter railroad station in the hamlet of Nanuet in the town of Clarkstown, Rockland County, New York. Located on Prospect Street near its intersection with Orchard Street West, the station serves trains of Metro-North Railroad's Pascack Valley Line, operated under contract by NJ Transit between Spring Valley station in Spring Valley, New York and Hoboken Terminal in Hoboken, New Jersey. Nanuet station consists of a single low-level side platform with a partial roof alongside the single operating track and a small high-level platform to facilitate access to the handicapped. The station also has three parking lots available for use by commuters.

Nanuet station sits at the former junction of the Erie Railroad Piermont Branch, New City Branch and New Jersey and New York Railroad, but its history dates to June 30, 1841 with the opening of service on the railroad from Piermont to Goshen, New York. At the time, the station would be known as Red Tavern, where David Demarest operated a lumberyard to help facilitate railroad construction. In 1849, the station would be renamed Clarkstown. Upon realignment of the Erie Railroad main line on to the Paterson and Ramapo Railroad in 1852, the station would be moved onto the Piermont Branch. The name was changed into 1856 to its current of Nanuet.

The New Jersey and New York Railroad would reach Nanuet on May 27, 1871 as part of an extension of the Hackensack and New York Extension Railroad from Hillsdale, New Jersey. The station agent at Nanuet was eliminated in 1964 as part of cuts by the successor Erie Lackawanna Railroad and the station depot at Nanuet burned down on March 14, 1991.

== History ==
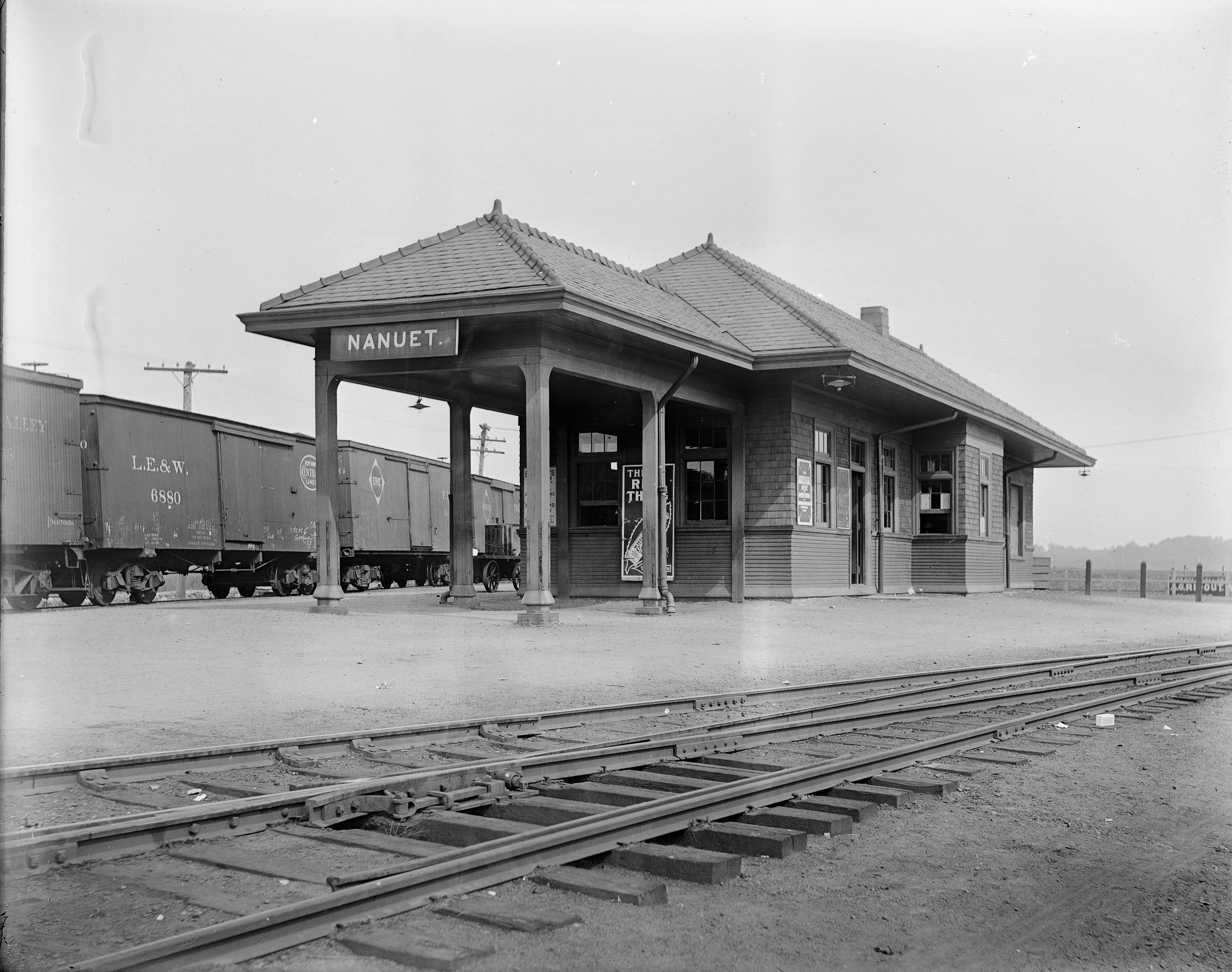
The former station depot at Nanuet, built by the Erie Railroad

The station at Nanuet began as a location for the pickup of ties for the New York and Erie Railroad in 1839. Known as Red Tavern, the location was run by David Demarest. At the location would board thirty-five men to help move the ties up the line.

By 1849, Demarest was named the station agent at Red Tavern and the station was renamed as Clarkstown. Demarest also used this occasion to construct two steam locomotives. The depot constructed at Clarkstown was part of Demarest's house, constructed in 1849. No tickets were sold at Clarkstown until 1852, and then the details were written in ink by Demarest himself. In 1856, the station was renamed Nanuet after a local Native American chief. Demarest remained in charge of the Nanuet station until his death in 1881, at which point his son, Joseph, took over as station agent.

== Station layout ==
The station has one track and one low-level side platform.

There are three parking lots available at Nanuet. Free permit parking is available for residents of the Town of Clarkstown at the station's closest parking lot. Permits are issues by the Town Clerk of the Town of Clarkstown. The lot accommodates 339 vehicles. Paid parking (either daily, or by permit) is available at the Metro-North parking facility, which is operated by LAZ Parking and accommodates 226 vehicles. The lot is located behind the Nanuet post office. A third parking facility operated by the town can accommodate 229 vehicles. The lot located west of the station and does not require payment or resident permit.

In April 2022, a new train shelter was installed with a bench named after transportation advocate Orrin Getz. The new shelter contains Help Points, USB charging and LED lights.

== Bibliography ==
- Mott, Edward Harold (1899). Between the Ocean and the Lakes: The Story of Erie. New York, New York: John S. Collins.
