= Pascack Valley Line =

Commuter rail line in New Jersey and New York

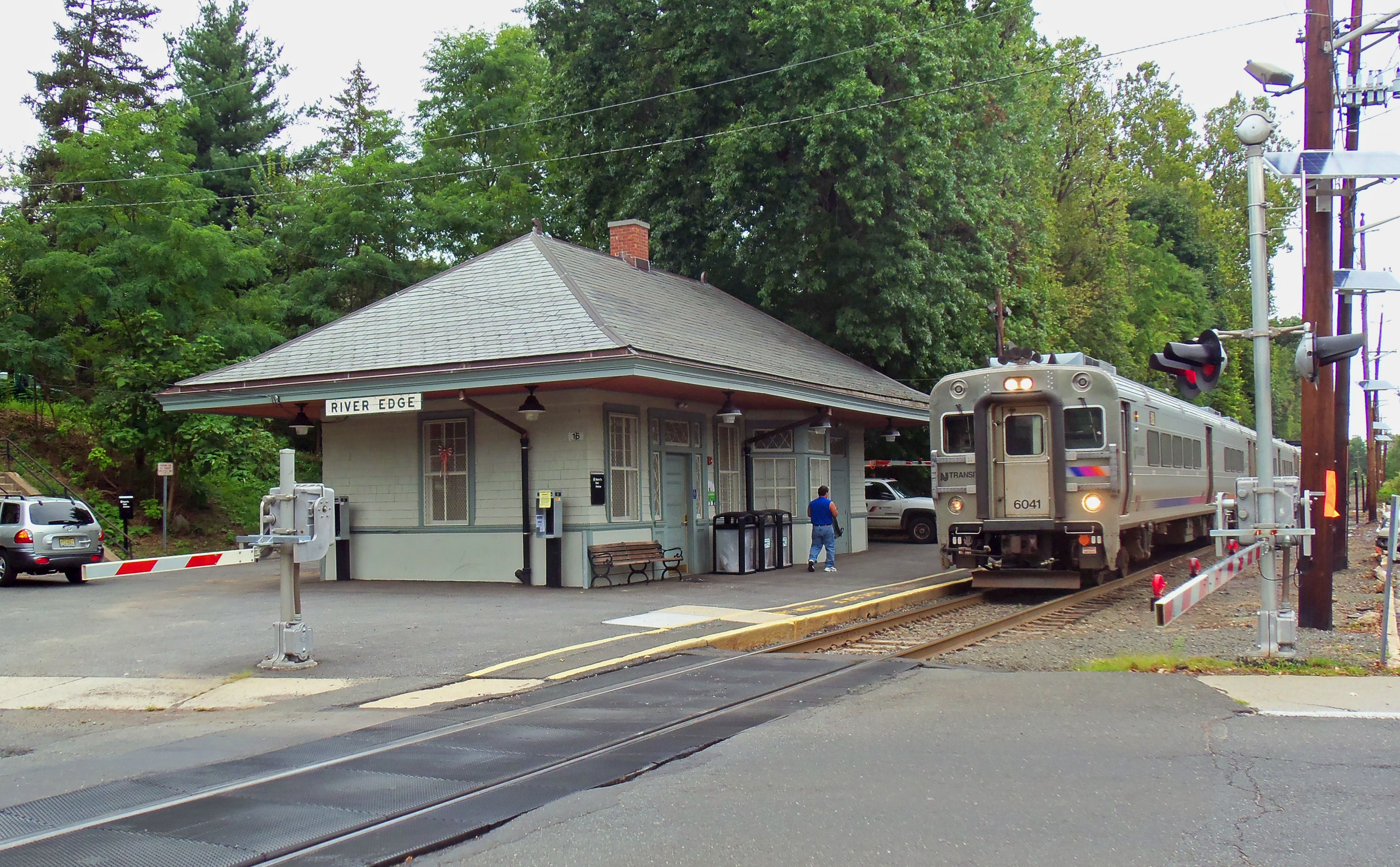
- A Hoboken Terminal-bound train at River Edge.

Overview
- Owner: New Jersey Transit
- Locale: Northern New Jersey and Hudson Valley, New York, United States
- Termini: Hoboken Terminal; Spring Valley
- Stations: 18

Service
- Type: Commuter rail
- System: New Jersey Transit Rail Operations; Metro-North Railroad
- Operator(s): New Jersey Transit
- Rolling stock: F40PH-3C/GP40PH-2/GP40FH-2/PL42AC/ALP-45DP locomotives Comet V/Multilevel Coaches
- Daily ridership: 4,450 (Q1, FY 2025)
- Ridership: 495,890 (annual ridership, 2024)

Technical
- Number of tracks: 1
- Track gauge: 4 ft 8 1/2 in (1,435 mm) standard gauge

The Pascack Valley Line is a commuter rail line operated by the Hoboken Division of New Jersey Transit, in the U.S. states of New Jersey and New York. The line runs north from Hoboken Terminal, through Hudson and Bergen counties in New Jersey, and into Rockland County, New York, terminating at Spring Valley station. Service within New York is operated under contract with Metro-North Railroad. The line is named for the Pascack Valley region that it passes through in northern Bergen County. The line parallels the Pascack Brook for some distance. The line is colored purple on system maps, and its symbol is a pine tree.

== Description ==
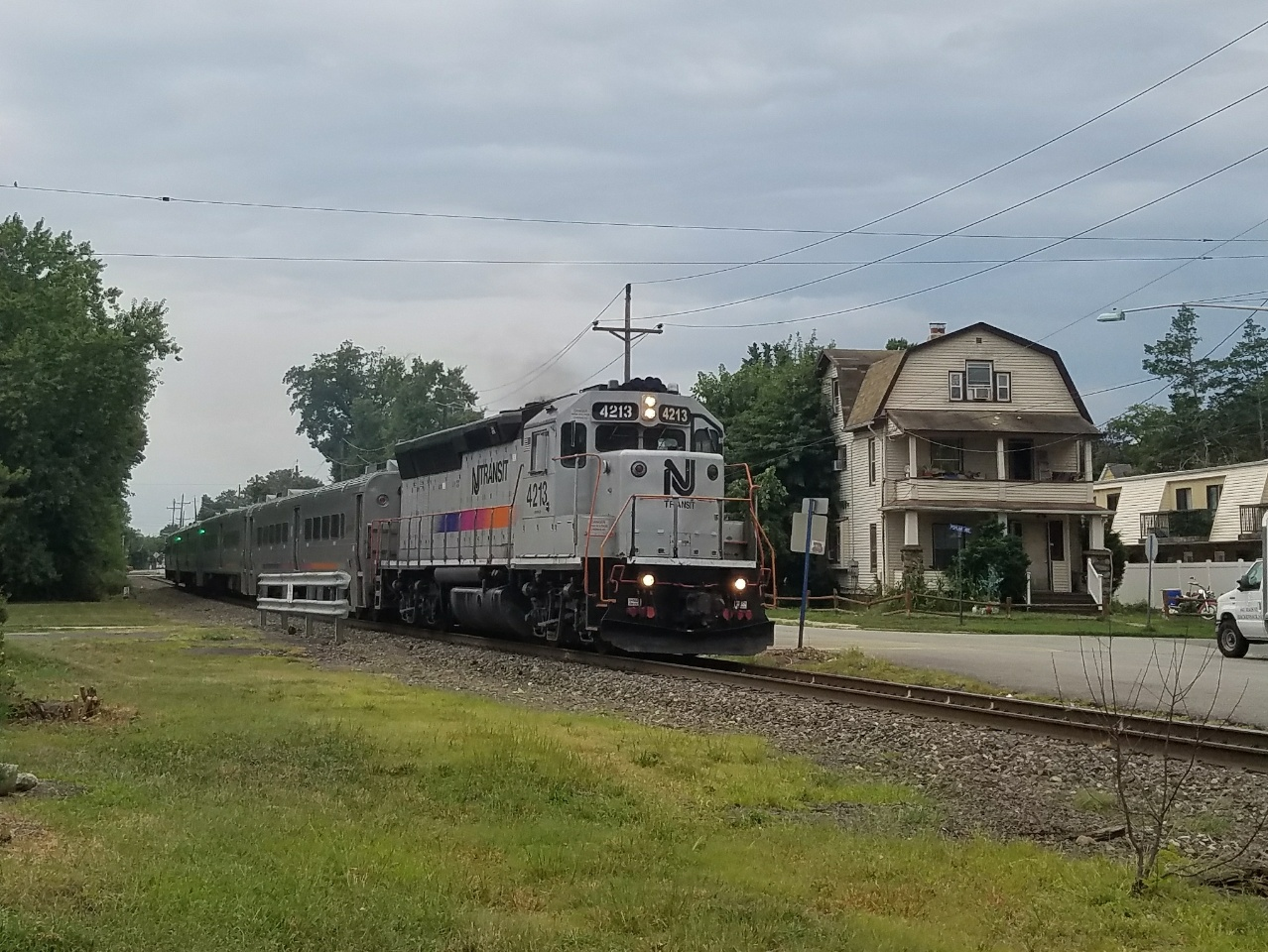
NJ Transit GP40PH-2B 4213 leading an outbound Pascack Valley Line train at Main St. level crossing in Hackensack, N.J.

The Pascack Valley Line runs between Spring Valley, New York, and Hoboken Terminal. The line is 31 miles (50 km) long, of which the northernmost 6 miles (9.7 km) are in New York State. The entire line is owned by NJ Transit, but the Pearl River, Nanuet and Spring Valley stations are leased to Metro-North Railroad. The line is single tracked, but sidings at points along the line, including the Meadowlands, Hackensack and Nanuet, permit bi-directional off-peak service. A siding in Oradell was also planned for increased service and reliability, but the project was halted due to local opposition. Service on this line operates seven days a week.

== History ==
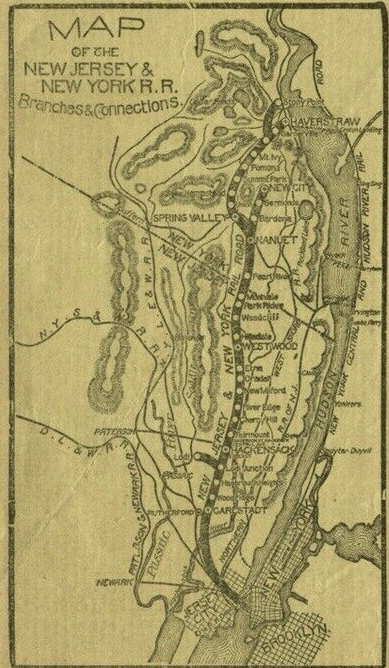
1893 map of the New Jersey and New York Railroad

The line was originally chartered as the Hackensack and New York Railroad in 1856. It later became the New Jersey and New York Railroad, which was bought by the Erie Railroad in 1896. The New Jersey and New York Railroad continued to exist as an Erie subsidiary until October 17, 1960 merger that created the Erie Lackawanna Railroad.

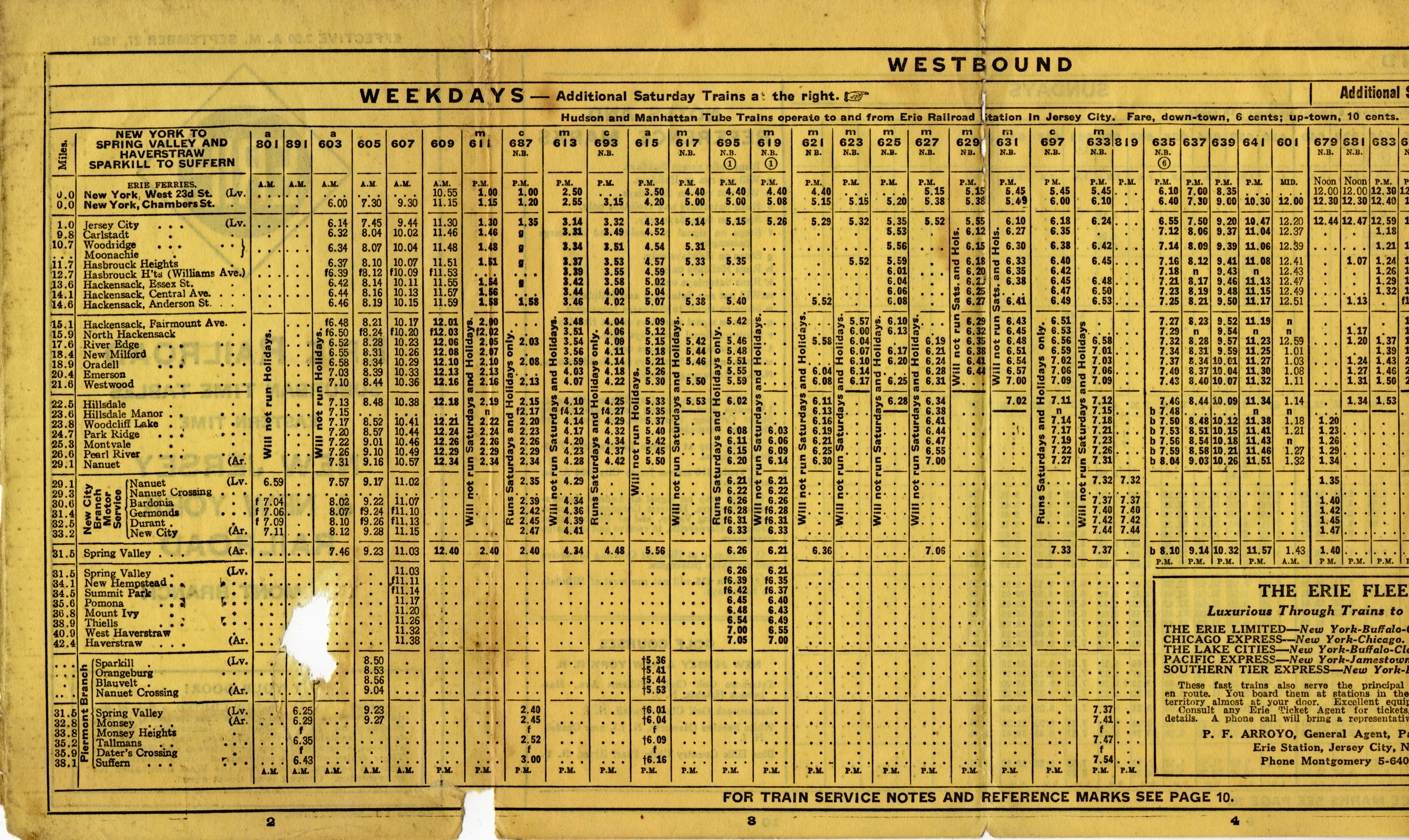
Passenger Timetable for the New York & New Jersey Railroad and Piermont Branch, effective 1931-09-27

On April 1, 1976 the Erie Lackawanna was merged with several other railroads to create Conrail. In 1983, after several years under operation by Conrail, operations of the Pascack Valley Line were transferred to NJ Transit Rail Operations.

The line used to continue north of Spring Valley to Haverstraw, New York. This portion of the line has been abandoned and most of the right-of-way has been sold off. Part of the line (between Spring Valley and Nanuet) was once part of the main Erie Railroad line from Piermont, New York to Buffalo, New York. Into the 1930s there had been Erie passenger service from Spring Valley at the end of the Pascack line to Suffern station on the newer Erie Main Line. By 1941, this was reduced to a single weekday trip in each direction.

In August 2020, amidst the financial repercussions of the COVID-19 pandemic, the Metropolitan Transportation Authority said that it would shut down service on the line in Rockland County if federal bailout money were not available.

== Route description ==
The Pascack Valley is largely a one-track line but the line starts from Hoboken Terminal as with the rest of the Hoboken Division lines, The line heads through the Bergen Tunnels and then heads down West End Interlocking as trains not only split off with the Morristown Line, Montclair-Boonton Line, and Gladstone Branch but the train heads into diesel-powered rail zones. After a few miles, the train arrives at its first station stop: Secaucus Junction which serves as a major transfer point between NJ-transit rail's Newark and Hoboken Divisions.

Just after Leaving Secaucus, the line follows the right of way as it splits off with the Main Line as it follows the Bergen County Line through the Meadowlands, the line not only passes the former Harmon Cove station but it also parallels the Hackensack River to its left and Meadowlands Parkway complexes to its right. The line uses the HX Draw to cross the Hackensack River and enters into Bergen County, the train heads through the Meadowlands, the line not only crosses under the New Jersey Turnpike but it also crosses under Route 3 at Berry's Creek. The Pascack Valley Line splits off with the Bergen County Line at Pascack Junction as the line heads through East Rutherford and the line passes sport Interlocking before it heads onto a 1 track line towards Spring Valley station.

The first stop for trains after leaving Secaucus Junction is Wood-Ridge station, from Wood-Ridge the line bypasses Hasbrouck Heights and as the line passes a siding, it arrives at its next station stop : Teterboro station.

After Teterboro, the line crosses under U.S. Route 46 and as the line inches closer to Hackensack, the line crosses under Interstate 80 before it enters Hackensack, the line has two station stops in Hackensack, first is the Essex Street station in Hackensack and from Essex Street, trains head through the streets of Hackensack and pass by Hackensack High School before arriving at its next station stop : Anderson Street station.

After Anderson Street, the line heads out of Hackensack and as the line crosses under Route 4 it arrives at its next station stop: New Bridge Landing station. After New Bridge Landing, the line heads up into the suburbs where it enters River Edge, New Jersey, which is where the line serves the namesake station. After River Edge, the line bypasses New Milford and heads into Oradell where the line enters its next station stop that serves the namesake town.

After Oradell, the line enters the Pascack Valley and in the Pascack Valley, the line serves Emerson, Westwood, and Hillsdale but the line bypasses the former Hillsdale manor station and then the trains serves three more municipalities within the Pascack Valley which include Woodcliff Lake, Park Ridge, and Montvale. Trains cross the New York State line into Rockland County, where the line serves Pearl River in Orangetown and Nanuet in Clarkstown. Afterwards the train would cross over a highway that carries Interstate 87, Interstate 287, and the New York State Thruway before arriving at its final stop at Spring Valley station.

== Rolling stock ==
The Pascack Valley line is a diesel powered line, utilizing diesel locomotives, such as the GP40PH-2, GP40FH-2, F40PH-3C, PL42AC, and ALP-45DP. Most trains consist of Comet V cars; Multilevel coaches are also used.

== September 2016 crash ==
On September 29, 2016, Pascack Valley Line Train 1614 crashed into Hoboken Terminal injuring 108 and killing one. It was later determined that the engineer Thomas Gallagher had been suffering from sleep apnea and had failed to report it.

== Stations ==
State	Zone	Location	Station	Milepost (km)	Date opened	Date closed	Connections
NJ	1	Hoboken	Hoboken Terminal	0.0 (0.0)	1903		NJ Transit Rail: ■ Bergen County Line, ■ Meadowlands Rail Line, ■ Gladstone Branch, ■ Main Line, ■ Montclair–Boonton Line, ■ Morristown Line, ■ Raritan Valley Line; Metro-North Railroad: ■ Port Jervis Line; Hudson–Bergen Light Rail: ■ 8th Street–Hoboken, ■ Hoboken–Tonnelle; PATH: HOB-33 HOB-WTC JSQ-33 (via HOB); NJ Transit Bus; NY Waterway to Battery Park City
NJ	1	Secaucus	Secaucus Junction	3.5 (5.6)	December 15, 2003		NJ Transit Rail (upper level): ■ Gladstone Branch, ■ Montclair–Boonton Line, ■ Morristown Line, ■ Northeast Corridor Line, ■ North Jersey Coast Line, ■ Raritan Valley Line; NJ Transit Rail (lower level): ■ Bergen County Line, ■ Meadowlands Rail Line, ■ Main Line; Metro-North Railroad: ■ Port Jervis Line; NJ Transit Bus
NJ	3	Carlstadt	Carlstadt		January 21, 1861	1967	
NJ	3	Wood-Ridge	Wood-Ridge	9.6 (15.4)	January 21, 1861		
NJ	3	Hasbrouck Heights	Hasbrouck Heights		January 21, 1861	1967	
NJ	4	Hasbrouck Heights	Teterboro	11.2 (18.0)	May 29, 1904		Formerly Williams Avenue
NJ	5	Hackensack	Essex Street	12.4 (20.0)	January 21, 1861		NJ Transit Bus
NJ	5	Hackensack	Central Avenue		1870	1953	
NJ	5	Hackensack	Passaic Street			September 9, 1869	
NJ	5	Hackensack	Anderson Street	13.5 (21.7)	September 7, 1869		NJ Transit Bus
NJ	5	Hackensack	Fairmount Avenue		March 4, 1870	1983	
NJ	6	River Edge	New Bridge Landing	14.7 (23.7)	March 4, 1870		NJ Transit Bus, Rockland Coaches
NJ	6	River Edge	River Edge	16.4 (29.4)	March 4, 1870		NJ Transit Bus, Rockland Coaches
NJ	6	River Edge	New Milford		March 4, 1870		
NJ	7	Oradell	Oradell	17.8 (28.6)	March 4, 1870		NJ Transit Bus, Rockland Coaches
NJ	8	Emerson	Emerson	19.3 (31.1)	March 4, 1870		NJ Transit Bus, Rockland Coaches
NJ	9	Westwood	Westwood	20.5 (33.0)	March 4, 1870		NJ Transit Bus, Rockland Coaches
NJ	9	Hillsdale	Hillsdale	21.4 (34.4)	March 4, 1870		Rockland Coaches
NJ	9	Hillsdale	Hillsdale Manor		1893		
NJ	10	Woodcliff Lake	Woodcliff Lake	22.7 (36.5)	May 27, 1871		
NJ	10	Park Ridge	Park Ridge	23.6 (38.0)	May 27, 1871		
NJ	10	Montvale	Montvale	24.2 (38.9)	May 27, 1871		Rockland Coaches
NY	MNR	Orangetown	Pearl River	25.6 (41.2)	May 27, 1871		Transport of Rockland
NY	MNR	Clarkstown	Nanuet	27.9 (44.9)	June 30, 1841		Transport of Rockland, Rockland Coaches
NY	MNR	Spring Valley	Spring Valley	30.6 (49.2)	June 30, 1841		Transport of Rockland, Hudson Link, Rockland Coaches

== Bibliography ==
- Mott, Edward Harold (1899). Between the Ocean and the Lakes: The Story of Erie. New York, New York: John S. Collins.
