= Transport of Rockland =

Bus system for Rockland County, New York, US

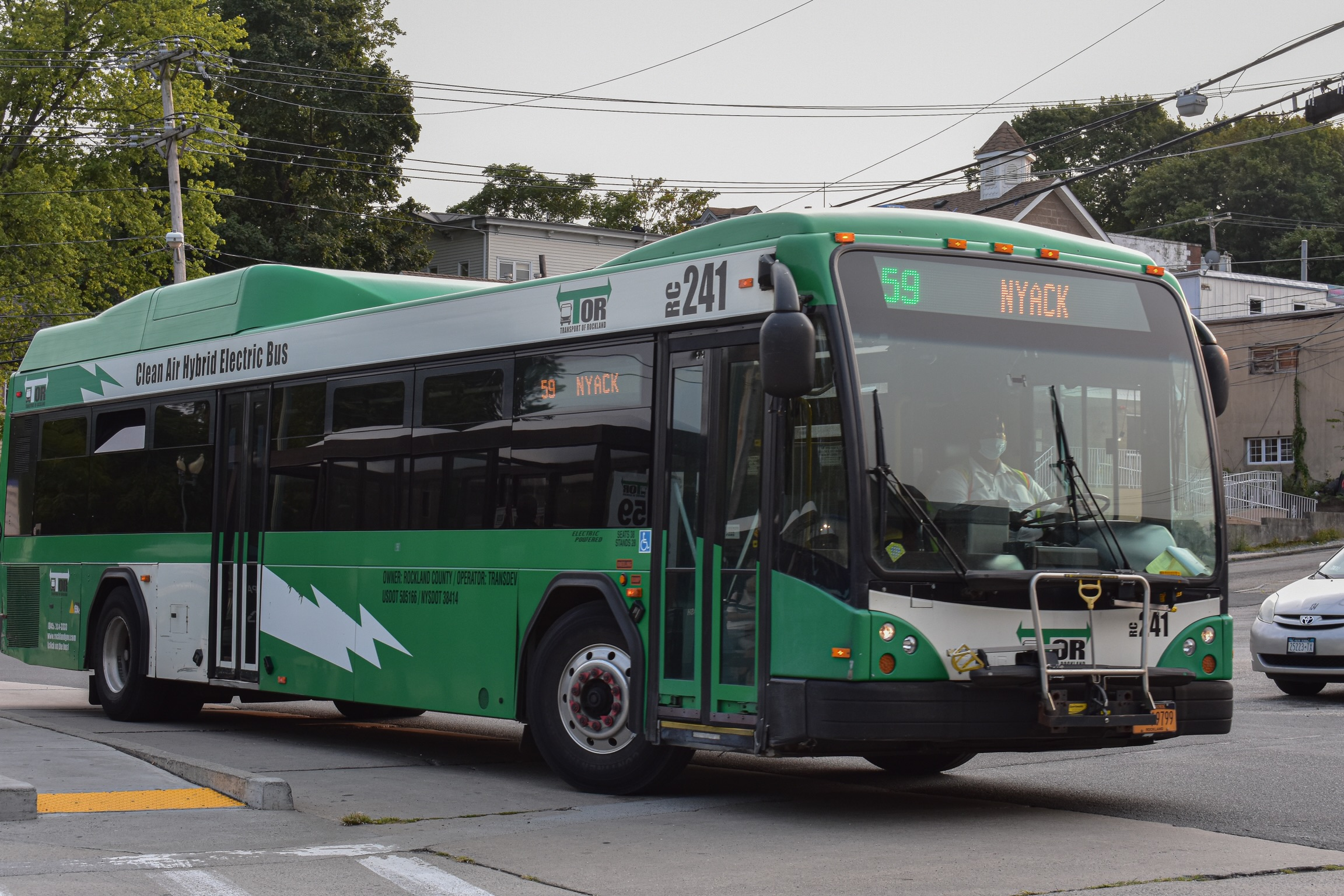
- Gillig BRT RC241 on Route 59 leaves Spring Valley Transit Center, bound for Nyack.
- Parent: Rockland County Department of Public Transportation
- Headquarters: Yeager Health Center, Bldg. T Pomona, New York 10970
- Locale: Rockland County, New York
- Service type: Local bus transit
- Fleet: 49
- Operator: Transdev
- Chief executive: Commissioner
- Website: Transport of Rockland

The Transport of Rockland (TOR) is the bus system for Rockland County, New York, providing service along major routes in Rockland County, as well as connections to Clarkstown Mini-Trans in Clarkstown, Spring Valley Jitney in Spring Valley, the Bee-Line Bus System in Westchester as well as connections to Rockland Coaches and Short Line Bus routes providing commuter and local service to Northern New Jersey and New York City's Port Authority Bus Terminal, George Washington Bridge Bus Station, 5th Avenue, and Long Island. Annual ridership in 2008 was 3,862,232.

== Service area ==
TOR serves an area of 176 square miles (460 km^{2}) with a population of 286,753. Operations of fixed-route service is provided by Transdev of Hillburn, New York, as of November 1, 2018. The previous contractor was Brega Transport Corporation for routes within Rockland County,

TOR provides service primarily along county and state highway corridors in Rockland County, along with shuttle routes servicing the towns of Ramapo, Clarkstown, and the Village of Spring Valley. There are other minibus services provided by those towns that supplement TOR service.

== Fare ==
The standard one-way fare for Transport of Rockland fixed-route services as of 2020 is free.

TOR transfers are valid on other TOR buses, Spring Valley Jitney vans, Lower Hudson Transit Link buses, and Clarkstown Mini-Trans vans. Lower Hudson Transit Link transfers, in addition to validity on these service, are also valid for a connecting Bee-Line bus or the CT Transit Stamford I-Bus to Greenwich, CT, and Stamford, CT.

== Paratransit ==
The County of Rockland also operates Transportation Resources Intra-County for Physically Handicapped and Senior Citizens (T.R.I.P.S.), the ADA-mandated curbside-to-curbside para-transit bus service for Rockland County residents who are physically or mentally challenged. In addition, senior citizens over the age of 60 who find it difficult or impossible to use fixed-route bus service can also use this service.

== Routes ==
The Transport of Rockland provides service along twelve routes. All service is accessible to customers with mobility impairments.

The full route is shown except for branching.

Route	Terminals		Major streets	Notes
59	Suffern; Lafayette Avenue and Chestnut Street	Nyack; Artopee Way	NY 59; West Nyack Road	
91	Spring Valley Bus Terminal	Nyack; Cedar and Main Streets	North Main Street; New Hempstead Road; Ramapo Road; US 9W; NY 303; Nyack Turnpike	Service operates via Haverstraw.; Some weekday and Saturday trips operate via New City, the Yeager Center, and Helen Hayes Hospital.; Weekday and Saturday trips that does not serve New City are marked as "Spring Valley Direct" or "Haverstraw Direct".; No Sunday service between Palisades Center and Nyack, or to New City, the Yeager Center, or Helen Hayes Hospital.
92	Spring Valley Bus Terminal	Palisades Center	Red Schoolhouse Road; Orangeburg Road; NY 303; Nyack Turnpike	Service to Sparkill is provided weekday middays and on all day weekends only.; No rush-hour service to Palisades Center; use the #97 running along Route 303.; No midday or weekend service to Nyack, service terminates at Palisades Center. Use #59 or #91 for Nyack service.; One AM trip operates via Crooked Hill Road.; Between Chestnut Ridge and Pearl River, there is another stop in Montvale, New Jersey at the intersection of Spring Valley Road at Summit Avenue.
92	Spring Valley Bus Terminal	Nyack; Cedar and Main Streets	Red Schoolhouse Road; Orangeburg Road; NY 303; Nyack Turnpike	Service to Sparkill is provided weekday middays and on all day weekends only.; No rush-hour service to Palisades Center; use the #97 running along Route 303.; No midday or weekend service to Nyack, service terminates at Palisades Center. Use #59 or #91 for Nyack service.; One AM trip operates via Crooked Hill Road.; Between Chestnut Ridge and Pearl River, there is another stop in Montvale, New Jersey at the intersection of Spring Valley Road at Summit Avenue.
93	Pearl River; Middletown Road and East Central Avenue	Sloatsburg; Washington Avenue and Seven Lakes Parkway	Middletown Road; Viola Road; Eckerson Road; Orange Turnpike	
94	Spring Valley Bus Terminal	Tomkins Cove; Elm Avenue	Maple Avenue; Forshay Road; Pomona Road; Thiells-Mount Ivy Road; Filors Lane; Routes 9W/202	No Sunday service.; Limited service between Helen Hayes Hospital and Tomkins Cove.
95	Rockland Community College	Haverstraw; Broadway and New Main Street	Ramapo Road; Grandview Avenue	Weekday service only.
97	Stony Point; South Liberty Drive and Lowland Hill Road	Tappan; NY 303 and Oak Tree Road	Liberty Drive (9W); NY 303	Weekday rush-hour service only.; Service between Haverstraw and Palisades Center also provided by the 91.; At Tappan, the bus will cross the state border of NY and NJ (on Route 303) and make the last stop in Northvale, New Jersey.
Loop 1	Monsey; Shoppers' Haven		Route 306; Suzanne Drive; Elish Parkway; Park Lane; Central Avenue; Robert Pitt Drive	No Saturday service (there is Sunday service).; All service operates via Atrium Plaza in Spring Valley.
Loop 2	Monsey; Shoppers' Haven		Route 306; Blauvelt Road; Yale Drive; Dr. Frank Road; Francis Place; Maple Avenue; Church Street; Monsey Boulevard; Robert Pitt Drive	No Saturday service (there is Sunday service).; All service operates via Atrium Plaza in Spring Valley.
Loop 3	Spring Valley Bus Terminal	Suffern; Lafayette Avenue and Orange Avenue	NY 59; College Road; Old Nyack Turnpike	
FX	Palisades Center	Haverstraw; Ferry Dock	NY 59, NY 303	Began operation in July 2024, operates weekends only.

=== Tappan ZEExpress (discontinued) ===
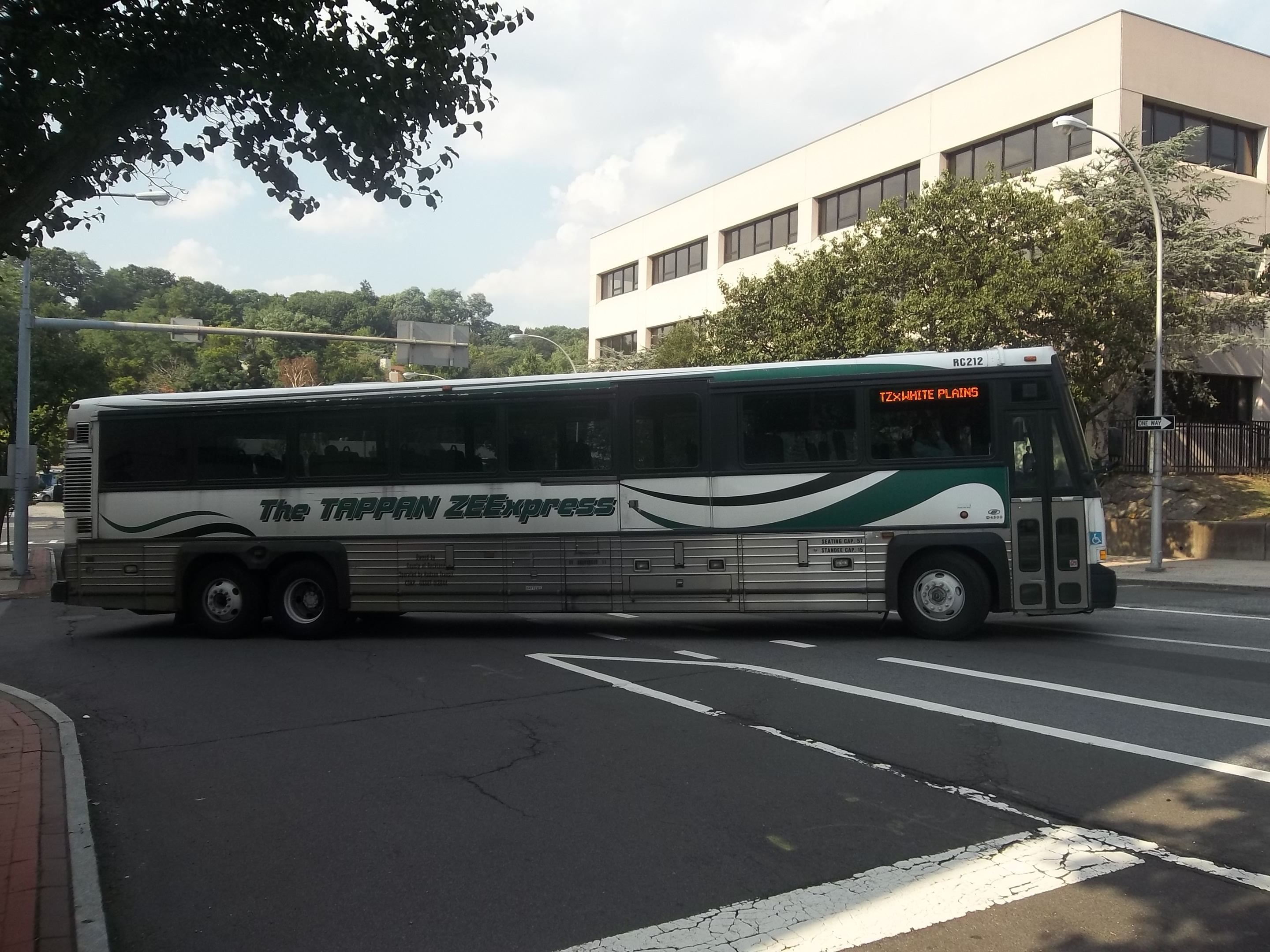
A former Tappan Zee Express bus en route to the White Plains TransCenter as seen in 2012.

Service on the Tappan ZEExpress was discontinued in October 2018. Service across the Tappan Zee Bridge is now provided by Hudson Link buses owned by the New York State Department of Transportation operated by Transdev.

== Fleet ==
Fleet number(s)	Photo	Year	Manufacturer	Model	Notes
RC221-RC228		2009	Gillig	BRT HEV 35'	Part of order of 16 buses which are first Hybrid buses in the fleet.
RC229-RC230		2009	Gillig	BRT HEV 40'	Part of order of 16 buses which are first Hybrid buses in the fleet.
RC231-RC236		2009	Gillig	BRT HEV 29'	Formerly used on the Tappan ZEExpress; Part of order of 16 buses which are first Hybrid buses in the fleet.
RC241-RC243		2010	Gillig	BRT HEV 40'	
RC244-RC246		2010	Gillig	BRT HEV 35'	
RC304-RC305		2015	Gillig	Low Floor 29'	
RC306-RC307		2015	Gillig	Low Floor 35'	
RC308-RC312 RC314-RC316		2018	Gillig	Low Floor 40'	
RC317-RC321		2018	Gillig	Low Floor 35'	
RC322-RC324		2022	Gillig	Low Floor 35'	
RC333-RC341		2022	Gillig	Low Floor 40'	
RC342-RC343		2025	Gillig	Low Floor 29'	
