= Hillsdale station (NJ Transit) =

NJ Transit rail station

Hillsdale
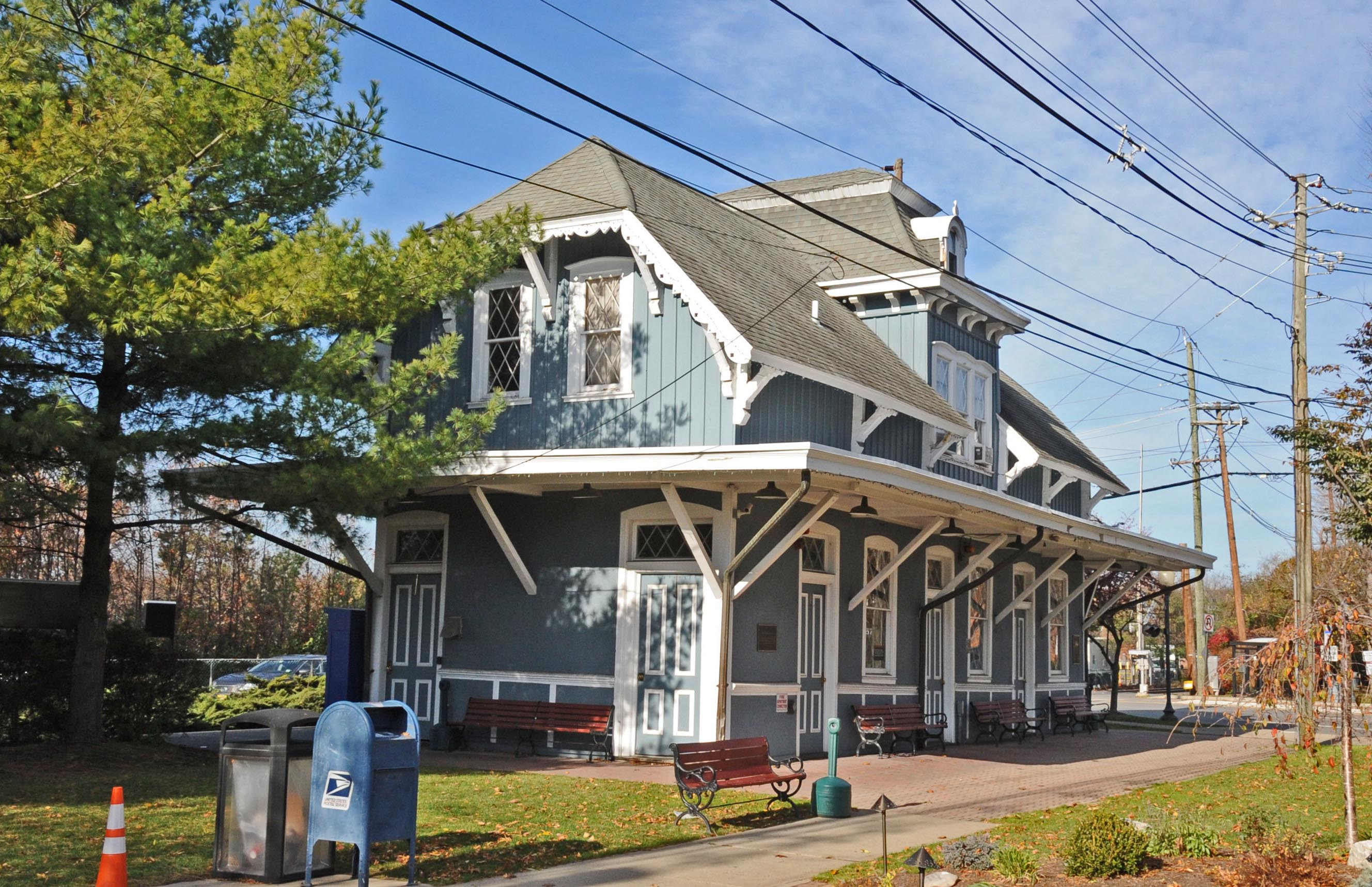

General information
- Location: Broadway (CR 104) at Hillsdale Avenue (CR 112), Hillsdale, Bergen County, New Jersey 07642
- Coordinates: 41.0024°N 74.0409°W
- Owner: New Jersey Transit
- Platforms: 1 side platform
- Tracks: 1
- Connections: Rockland Coaches: 11

Construction
- Parking: Yes (permit required)
- Cycle facilities: Yes

Other information
- Station code: 781 (Erie Railroad)
- Fare zone: 9

History
- Opened: March 4, 1870

Key dates
- 1981: Station agency closed

Passengers
- 2025: 239 (average weekday)
- Rank: 93 of 153

Services
Preceding station	NJ Transit	Following station
Woodcliff Lake toward Spring Valley	Pascack Valley Line	Westwood toward Hoboken
Former services
Preceding station	Erie Railroad	Following station
Woodcliff Lake toward Haverstraw	New Jersey and New York Railroad	Westwood toward Jersey City
Hillsdale Manor toward Haverstraw	New Jersey and New York Railroad until 1940s	Westwood toward Jersey City
- Hillsdale Station
- U.S. National Register of Historic Places
- New Jersey Register of Historic Places
- Location: Broadway and Hillsdale Avenue, Hillsdale, New Jersey
- Coordinates: 41°0′9″N 74°2′28″W
- Area: less than one acre
- Architects: Post & Camp
- Architectural style: Second Empire architecture, Stick/Eastlake
- MPS: Operating Passenger Railroad Stations TR
- NRHP reference No.: 84002566
- NJRHP No.: 537

Significant dates
- Added to NRHP: June 22, 1984
- Designated NJRHP: March 17, 1984
Location

Hillsdale is an active commuter railroad station in the borough of Hillsdale, Bergen County, New Jersey. Servicing trains on New Jersey Transit's Pascack Valley Line, the station is located at the intersection of Broadway (County Route 104) and Hillsdale Avenue (County Route 112). The next station to the north toward Spring Valley station is Woodcliff Lake and the next station to the south toward Hoboken Terminal is Westwood. The station contains one track while a single low-level side platform next to the station depot, resulting in no accessibility for handicapped persons under the Americans with Disabilities Act of 1990.

Service began on March 4, 1870 with the extension of the Hackensack and New York Extension Railroad from Anderson Street station in Hackensack to Hillsdale. The station later became one of two stops operated by the Erie Railroad in Hillsdale, following the opening of Hillsdale Manor station in 1893.

== History ==
The original station house, built 1870 as the terminus and headquarters of the New Jersey and New York Railroad, The head house has been on the state and federal registers of historic places since 1984 originally listed as part of the Operating Passenger Railroad Stations Thematic Resource. A large train yard once existed in the area of what is now Kings Super Markets.

== Station layout ==
The station has one track and one low-level side platform.

Permit parking is operated by the Borough of Hillsdale. Four permit parking lots area available, with 170, 14, 15 and 69 spots, respectively. Permits may be obtained through the Borough of Hillsdale.

A dozen non-permit spaces are available for $5.00 per day, payable in a yellow collection box at the station.

== See also ==
- List of New Jersey Transit stations
- National Register of Historic Places listings in Bergen County, New Jersey
