= Spring Valley station (New York) =

NJ Transit and Metro-North Railroad station

Spring Valley
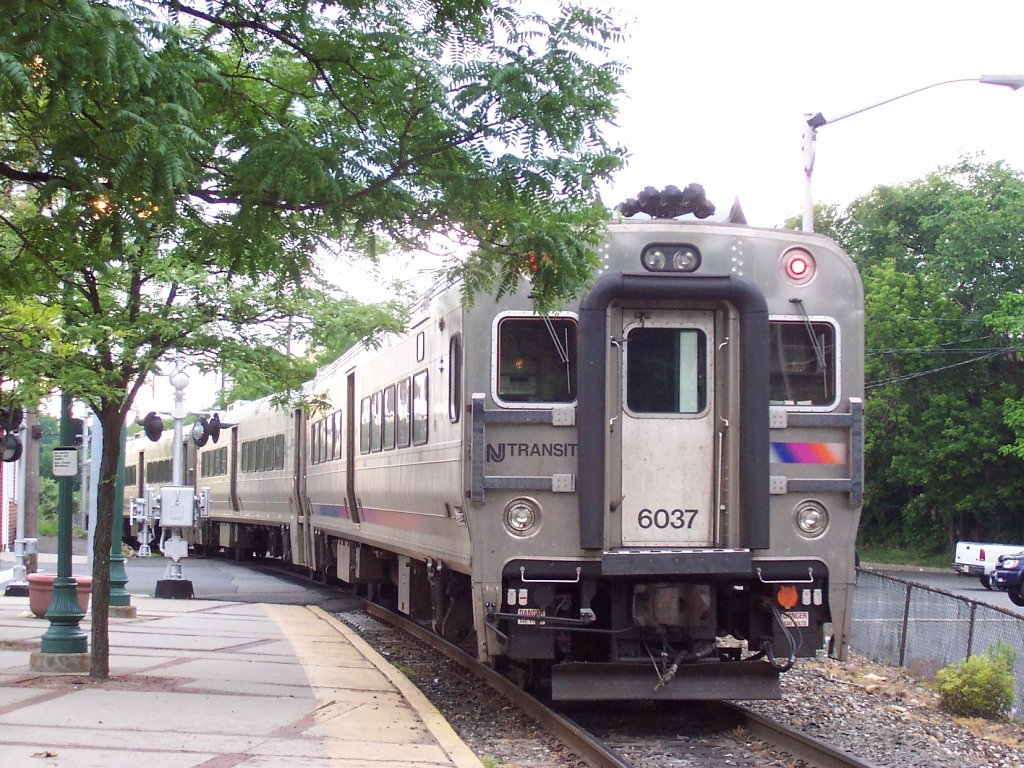
- Train leaves Spring Valley station, going over the Main Street (NY 45) crossing

General information
- Location: Municipal Plaza; 1 North Main Street; Spring Valley, New York
- Coordinates: 41°06′43″N 74°02′38″W
- Owner: NJ Transit
- Operator: Metro-North Railroad
- Line: Pascack Valley Line
- Platforms: 1 side platform
- Tracks: 1
- Connections: Hudson Link: H03, H07, H07X; Rockland Coaches: 11X (weekends only), 45; Transport of Rockland: 59, 91, 92, 94, Loop 3

Construction
- Parking: 207 spaces
- Accessible: Yes

Other information
- Station code: 815 (Erie Railroad)

History
- Opened: June 30, 1841
- Rebuilt: 1924
- Former names: Pascac

Key dates
- 1981: Station agency closed

Services
Preceding station	NJ Transit	Following station
Terminus	Pascack Valley Line	Nanuet toward Hoboken
Former services
Preceding station	Erie Railroad	Following station
Union toward Haverstraw	New Jersey and New York Railroad	Nanuet toward Jersey City
Monsey toward Suffern	Piermont Branch	Nanuet toward Sparkill
Location

Spring Valley station (sometimes referred as the Spring Valley Transit Center) is an intermodal transit station in Spring Valley, New York. It serves commuter trains as well as buses as the Spring Valley Bus Terminal. The buses that serve the Spring Valley Bus Terminal are Rockland Coaches (provided by Coach USA), Hudson Link, and Transport of Rockland. It is located on Main Street (Route 45), 0.125 miles (0.201 km) from Route 59.

== History ==
During construction of the New York, Lake Erie and Western Railroad, residents of what would later become Spring Valley demanded a station at the site of a farm road crossing. The residents felt that Eleazar Lord had chosen to give preference to the area at Monsey (formerly Kakiat) because he owned 8.5 acres (3.4 ha) in the area. They wanted access to shipping via the railroad, but the railroad would not promise service, even if the farmers built their own waiting shanty.

The farmers did indeed construct their own station, a 10-by-11-foot (3.0 m × 3.4 m) platform with a wooden shanty. The station, which was named Pascac by the railroad, soon became a store run by a local named Henry Iseman. Once passenger service started, Iseman was evicted from the shanty, having to run his shop elsewhere in the area. The name "Spring Valley" was created by Isaac Springstead, a local farmer, who suggested the new name. With the new name change, a station sign was nailed to a nearby tree with the name "Spring Valley".

On October 26, 1983, the $244,500 renovation of the station was dedicated. As part of the renovation the station received new ceilings, a new floor and a ticket booth.

== Station layout ==
The station has one track and one low-level side platform.

Permit parking is operated by Allright Parking and accommodates 207 vehicles.

== Bibliography ==
- Mott, Edward Harold (1899). Between the Ocean and the Lakes: The Story of Erie. New York, New York: John S. Collins.
