= Rockland Coaches =

Commuter bus company in New York and New Jersey

Coach USA Rockland Coaches (The Red & Tan Lines)

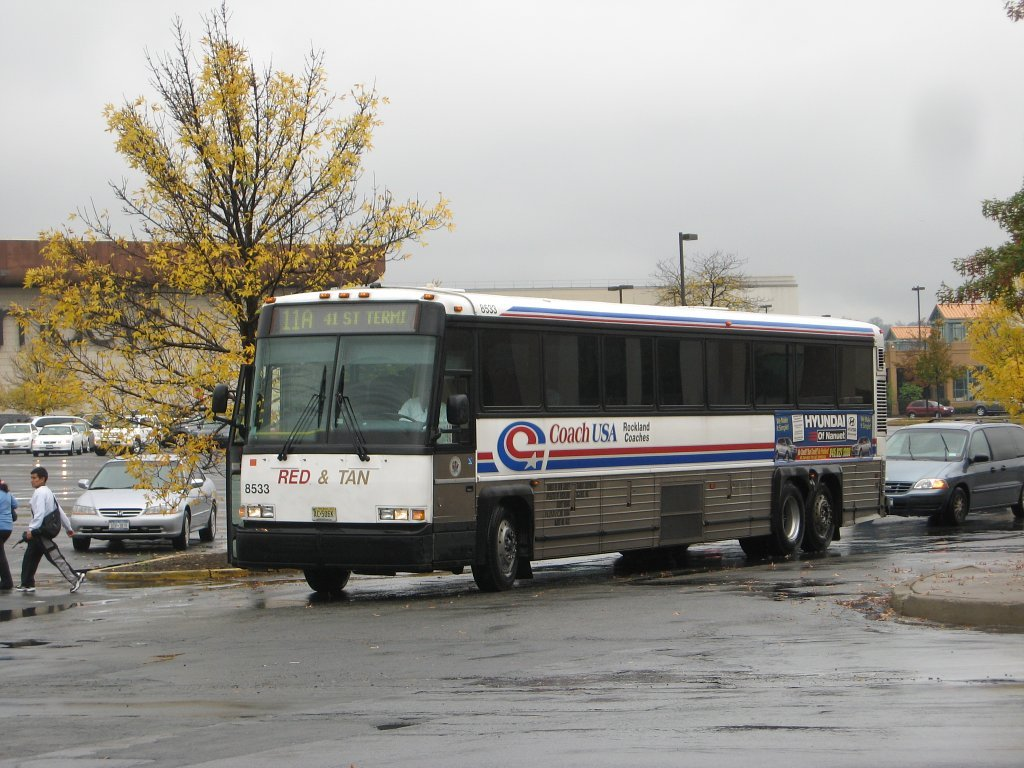
- A Rockland Coaches bus at Nanuet Mall
- Parent: Coach USA
- Founded: 1917
- Headquarters: 160 NJ Route 17, Paramus, New Jersey, U.S.
- Service area: Bergen County, New Jersey and Rockland County, New York
- Service type: Commuter bus service
- Routes: 6
- Hubs: Nanuet Mall, Port Authority Bus Terminal
- Fleet: See "Fleet" section below. All buses owned by New Jersey Transit
- Fuel type: Diesel-fueled motorcoaches
- Operator: Coach USA
- Chief executive: George Grieve
- Website: coachusa.com/rockland-coaches

Rockland Coaches Inc., formerly known as The Red and Tan Lines, and locally shortened to Red and Tan, is a bus company and subsidiary of Coach USA located in Westwood, New Jersey. It operates commuter bus service between New York City and some portions in Bergen County, New Jersey, and Rockland County, New York, It also provides local bus service in both locales north of Route 46. Coach USA acquired the company in 1997. Coach USA has been owned by Renco Group since 2024.

== Routes ==
Between Bergen and Rockland Counties, and New York City, Rockland Coaches provides service along six routes.

Route ends are given for each route except for branching. Some trips may only serve a portion of the route.

In March 2020, due to the COVID-19 pandemic, many routes were suspended or limited to peak-only service. Throughout 2020, 2021, and 2022, this limited-service schedule remained, however on April 1, 2023, limited Saturday service was restarted on the 11X and 45 routes.

On October 23, 2023, weekend service was reinstated on the 9A and 9T routes. In addition, limited off-peak weekday service was added on the 9A, 9T, and 20 routes. In this service change, Saturday service on the 45 was also cut. Despite these changes, most routes remain peak-only and commuter-oriented, and some routes remain suspended as of May 2023.

=== Route list ===
Route	Termini		Notes
9A (Note: All Route 9 buses are listed online as "9/9A", however the actual buses going to each NYC terminal denote which bus is which. Buses signed as 9A go to GWB Terminal and ones signed as 9T go to PABT.)	New York City; George Washington Bridge Bus Station	New City; Route 304 Park and Ride	Operates weekend service; Operates limited off-peak weekday service; Operates mainly along the route of the Hudson River
9T	New York City; Port Authority Bus Terminal	New City; Route 304 Park and Ride	Operates weekend service; Operates limited off-peak weekday service; Operates mainly along the route of the Hudson River
11A	New York City; Port Authority Bus Terminal	Stony Point; Route 202 Park and Ride	Peak hour service only; Operates mainly along the route of the Pascack Valley Line
11X	New York City; Port Authority Bus Terminal	Spring Valley; Metro-North station	Saturday service only; Serves Middletown park and ride in Clarkstown only on northbound trips; Operates mainly along Middletown Rd
20	New York City; Port Authority Bus Terminal	Nanuet; Nanuet Mall	Weekday only; Limited weekday off-peak service, mostly in the southbound direction; Operates mainly along the route of the Northern Branch
45	New York City; Port Authority Bus Terminal	Mount Ivy; Route 45 Park and Ride	Peak hour service only; Operates mainly along Route 45
47/49 Hybrid	New York City; Port Authority Bus Terminal	New City; Route 304 Park and Ride	Weekday only; Limited southbound-only weekday off-peak service; Limited southbound-only peak-only service operates via the Palisades Center

=== Former routes ===
- Rockland Coaches operated Transport of Rockland from 1976 to 2013, when it lost the contract.
- The 14, 21T, 46, and 49J, all commuter routes operating to New York City, have been suspended since the start of the COVID-19 pandemic.

== Fleet ==
The bus fleet of Rockland Coaches features MCI coach buses entirely equipped with apportioned registration plates. The fleet began with 1987 MCI MC-9B models, which were later replaced with D4000 and D4500 models in the early 2000s. From 2019 to 2021, the fleet was replaced with MCI D4500CT models.

=== Current fleet ===
All buses owned by New Jersey Transit Bus Operations. Only units originally allocated from the NJ Transit bus fleet to Rockland Coaches are shown.

Fleet numbers	Photo	Year	Make	Model	Notes
19001-19030	2019 MCI D4500CT #19015 owned by New Jersey Transit, operating out of Coach USA Rockland Coaches on the MTA LIRR shuttle	2019	MCI	D4500CT	
20149-20168	20157 on the Route 20	2020	MCI	D4500CT	Began revenue service in October 2021.

=== Retired fleet ===
Fleet numbers	Photo	Year	Make	Model	Notes
8454-8505; 8512-8513		2001	MCI	D4000	Transferred to other operators.; Retired and replaced with newer D4500CT coaches.
8554-8555; 8836-8845; 8877-8889		2003	MCI	D4000	Retired and replaced with newer D4500CT coaches.
8524-8553		2003	MCI	D4500	Transferred to Suburban Transit
21198-21241	21201 Rockland Coaches on the 351	2021	MCI	D4500CT	Returned to New Jersey Transit in 2024.; Some units never operated before returning to NJT.
