= New Jersey and New York Railroad =

Railroad connecting New Jersey and New York

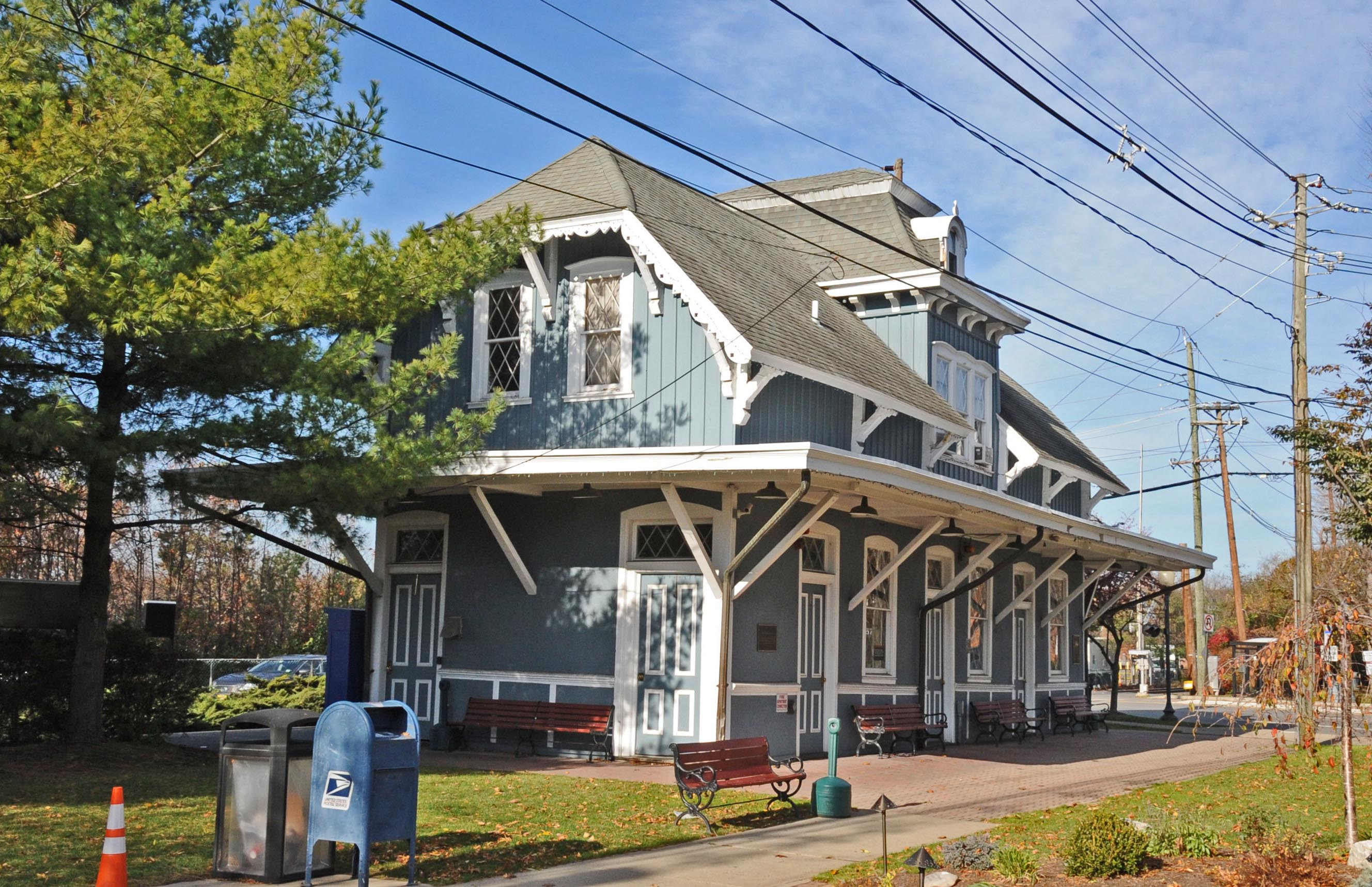
- The Hillsdale station house (1872) was the company headquarters.

Overview
- Headquarters: Hillsdale, New Jersey, U.S.
- Locale: Bergen County, New Jersey & Rockland County, New York
- Dates of operation: –1896
- Predecessor: Hackensack and New York Extension Railroad
- Successor: Erie Railroad

Technical
- Track gauge: 4 ft 8 1/2 in (1,435 mm) standard gauge

The New Jersey and New York Railroad (NJ&NY) was a railroad company that operated north from Rutherford, New Jersey, to Haverstraw, New York beginning in the mid-to-late 19th century.

== History ==
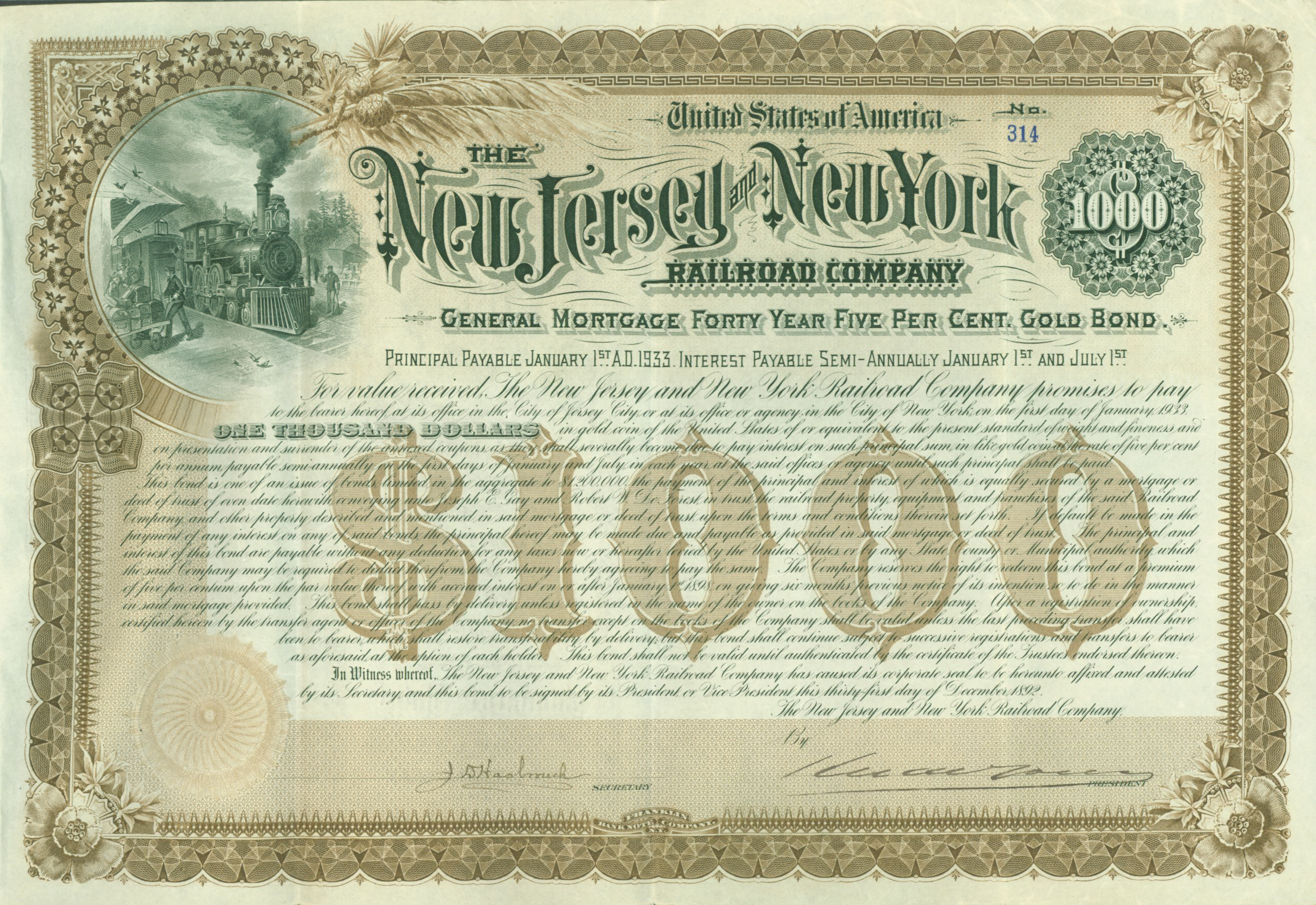
Gold Bond of the New Jersey & New York Railroad Company, issued 31 December 1892

The line was originally chartered as the Hackensack and New York Railroad (H&NY) in 1856. The H&NY would eventually run from Rutherford to Hackensack, New Jersey. In 1866 under the leadership of David P. Patterson the company was chartered as the Hackensack and New York Extension Railroad and it extended its line north of Hackensack. It later reorganized as the New Jersey and New York Railroad. The line reached the town of Hillsdale, New Jersey, by 1870, the village of West Haverstraw by 1873, and the village of Haverstraw by 1887.

The NJ&NY was leased for 99 years by the Erie Railroad in 1896. The NJ&NY continued to exist as an Erie subsidiary until the 1960 merger that created the Erie Lackawanna Railroad. In 1976, the Erie Lackawanna was merged with several other railroads to create Conrail. In 1983, after several years under operation by Conrail, operations of the Pascack Valley Line were transferred to New Jersey Transit Rail Operations. The segments of the two former railroad lines in New York – north of Spring Valley to Haverstraw and north of Nanuet to New City – are no longer in service.

In 1956, NJ&NY reported 4.4 million net ton-miles of revenue freight and 21 million passenger-miles on 39 miles of railroad.

== Stations ==
A typical New Jersey and New York Railroad station in the 1900s or 1910s featured a gable or hip roof and often had board and batten siding. The larger and more elaborate station at Hillsdale served as the company headquarters and was built in a mixture of the Second Empire and Stick-Eastlake architectural styles.

Early photographs of stations along the New Jersey and New York Railroad line include:

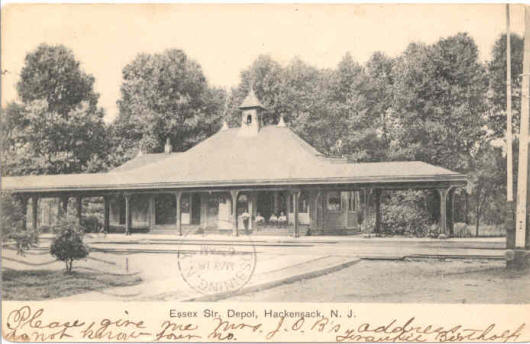
Essex Street station in Hackensack, New Jersey in 1907

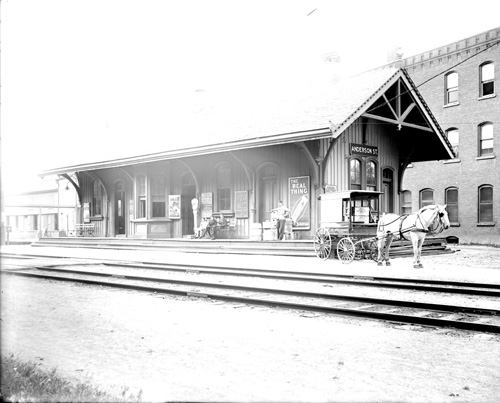
Anderson Street station in Hackensack, New Jersey in 1910

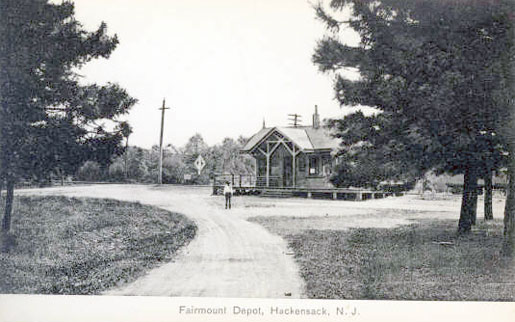
Fairmount Depot in Hackensack, New Jersey in 1911

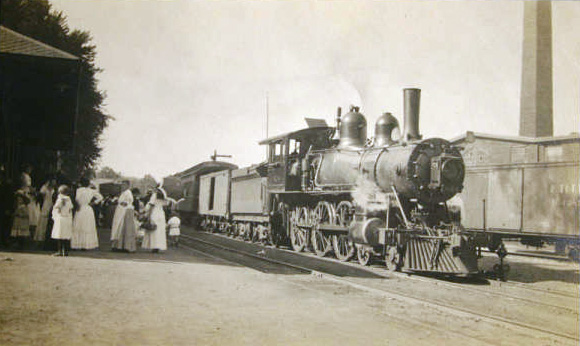
Pearl River station in Pearl River, New York in 1910
