= Park Ridge High School =

High school in New Jersey, United States

Location
- 2 Park Avenue; Park Ridge, Bergen County, New Jersey 07656; United States
- Coordinates: 41.034469°N 74.042096°W

Information
- Type: Public high school / middle school
- Established: 1900
- School district: Park Ridge Public Schools
- NCES School ID: 341245000710
- Principal: Troy Lederman
- Faculty: 59.2 FTEs
- Grades: 7-12
- Enrollment: 520 (as of 2023–24)
- Student to teacher ratio: 8.8:1
- Colors: Maroon and white
- Fight song: "Ridgers"
- Athletics conference: North Jersey Interscholastic Conference
- Team name: Owls
- Publication: Imprints (literary magazine)
- Newspaper: Night Watch
- Website: prhs.parkridgeschools.org

Park Ridge High School is a six-year comprehensive community public high school with an integrated two-year middle school located in the borough of Park Ridge in Bergen County, in the U.S. state of New Jersey, serving students in seventh through twelfth grades as the lone secondary school of the Park Ridge Public Schools. The school is accredited by the New Jersey Department of Education. The school is located on the corner of Park Avenue and Pascack Road in the center of Park Ridge. The school is one of the three public schools in, along with East Brook Elementary School and West Ridge Elementary School, which both serve grades K-6.

Park Ridge High School's building has two sections: the "main" building of three floors and the "A-wing" of two. The main building contains a multipurpose venue known as the "little theater," which hosts arts events such as the annual Middle School Variety Show, including seasonal theatrical productions. The A-wing branches off into two gymnasiums through its lower floor.

As of the 2023–24 school year, the school had an enrollment of 520 students and 59.2 classroom teachers (on an FTE basis), for a student–teacher ratio of 8.8:1. There were 17 students (3.3% of enrollment) eligible for free lunch and 9 (1.7% of students) eligible for reduced-cost lunch.

Park Ridge offers several Advanced Placement (AP) classes, run by the College Board. Average SAT scores for the class of 2013-14 were 528 in Critical reading, 559 in Mathematics and 546 on the Writing component for a composite score of 1633, compared to statewide averages of 496 / 521 / 497 respectively, and a composite score of 1514. There were 59.0% of students who met the standard of a 1550 composite score on the SAT, which College Board research shows to be indicative of college success, vs. 44.6% statewide.

== History ==
A previous high school building completed in 1900 burnt to the ground in June 1920. The current school building was completed in September 1922, having been designed to be resistant to fire and offering four times the capacity of the earlier structure. Until the opening of Pascack Valley High School in 1955, students from Hillsdale, Montvale and Woodcliff Lake had attended Park Ridge High School as part of sending/receiving relationships.

== Awards, recognition and rankings ==
The school was the 37th-ranked public high school in New Jersey out of 339 schools statewide in New Jersey Monthly magazine's September 2014 cover story on the state's "Top Public High Schools", using a new ranking methodology. The school had been ranked 14th in the state of 328 schools in 2012, after being ranked 18th in 2010 out of 322 schools listed. The magazine ranked the school 31st in 2008 out of 316 schools. The school was ranked 40th in the magazine's September 2006 issue, which included 316 schools across the state. Schooldigger.com ranked the school tied for 167th out of 381 public high schools statewide in its 2011 rankings (a decrease of 77 positions from the 2010 ranking) which were based on the combined percentage of students classified as proficient or above proficient on the mathematics (79.0%) and language arts literacy (95.8%) components of the High School Proficiency Assessment (HSPA).

== Athletics ==
Park Ridge High School Owls participate in the Patriot Division of the North Jersey Interscholastic Conference, which is comprised of small-enrollment schools in Bergen, Hudson, Morris and Passaic counties, and was created following a reorganization of sports leagues in Northern New Jersey by the New Jersey State Interscholastic Athletic Association (NJSIAA). Prior to the realignment that took effect at the start of the 2010–11 school year, Park Ridge was a member of the Bergen County Scholastic League (BCSL). With 262 students in grades 10–12, the school was classified by the NJSIAA for the 2019–20 school year as Group I for most athletic competition purposes, which included schools with an enrollment of 75 to 476 students in that grade range. The school was classified by the NJSIAA as Group I North for football for 2024–2026, which included schools with 254 to 474 students.

Park Ridge High School hosts several sports in statewide competition, including football, soccer, track and field, basketball, baseball, and many others. Park Ridge has done very well athletically in past years, especially with girls' sports, wrestling, and the track & field program. The school's athletic complex consists of several acres of open fields and a full sized high school football infield, surrounded by a recently constructed running track. The official fight song of the Owls is "Ridgers".

The school participates as the host school / lead agency for joint cooperative boys / girls bowling, cross country running. boys / girls golf and boys lacrosse teams with Emerson Junior-Senior High School, while Emerson is the host school for girls lacrosse and wrestling teams. These co-op programs operate under agreements scheduled to expire at the end of the 2023–24 school year.

The 1966 boys' basketball team finished the season with a 23–2 record after winning the Group I state championship by defeating Williamstown High School by a score of 64–62 on a late basket score in the final minute of the tournament final.

The boys cross country running team won the Group I state championship in 1973.

The baseball team won the Group I state title in 1977 (vs. Florence Township Memorial High School) and 2009 (vs. David Brearley High School). The 1977 team finished the season with a 24–3 record after winning the Group I title with a 1–0 victory in 13 innings against Florence Township in the championship game. The team won the 2009 Group I state championships, defeating County Prep High School 10–0 in the semi-final round, and taking the title with a 4–2 win over David Brearley in the championship game.

The girls volleyball team won the Group I state championship in 1983 (vs. Bogota High School) and 1985 (vs. Wallington High School). The 1983 team finished the season with a record of 21–2 after winning the Group I title by defeating Bogota in two games (15-10 and 15–13) in the final match of the tournament. The 1985 team win won the Group IV title against Wallington 15-10 and 15–4 in the tournament final.

The football team won the NJSIAA North I Group I state sectional championship in 1995 and in North II Group I in 2019. In 2019, the Owls finished the season with a 10–1 record after defeating Hasbrouck Heights High School in the tournament final to win the NJSIAA North II Group I state sectional championship by a score of 21–14, marking their first championship in 24 years. The team won the 2019 Group I North regional title with a 28–21 win against Boonton High School.

In 2006, Park Ridge boys' spring track went undefeated on their way to a BCSL Olympic championship, their first in 30 years. The girls' team lost only once, and also proceeded to win a championship.

In 2007, the girls' soccer team won the North I, Group I state sectional championship with a 2–0 win over Pompton Lakes High School in the tournament final, marking the first sectional title in team history.

In 2008, the boys' winter track team won their first state sectional meet.

Wrestling coach Stan Woods set a New Jersey record with his 602nd win in 2011 in a meet against Nutley High School.

== Administration ==
The school's principal is Troy Lederman. His core administration team includes the assistant principal.

== Noted alumni ==
- Jedh Colby Barker (class of 1964) — awarded the Medal of Honor
- Karen Duffy (class of 1979) — model, television personality, and actress
- Edith Margaret Faulstich — philatelist and journalist
- James Gandolfini (class of 1979) — actor, The Sopranos
- Kevin Herget — baseball pitcher for the Tampa Bay Rays
- The Roches — folk singers whose founding members were Maggie, Suzzy and Terre Roche
- Stephanie Ruhle — host of MSNBC's The 11th Hour with Stephanie Ruhle
- Travis Stever (class of 1997) — lead guitarist of Coheed and Cambria
- Dyanne Thorne — actress, stage performer and vocalist
