= Woodcliff Lake Public Schools =

School district in Bergen County, New Jersey, US

Address
- 134 Woodcliff Avenue Woodcliff Lake, Bergen County, New Jersey, 07677; United States
- Coordinates: 41.021019°N 74.057688°W

District information
- Grades: Pre-K to 8
- Superintendent: Lauren Barbelet
- Business administrator: Matthew M. Lynaugh
- Schools: 2

Students and staff
- Enrollment: 780 (as of 2023–24)
- Faculty: 73.0 FTEs
- Student–teacher ratio: 10.7:1

Other information
- District Factor Group: J
- Website: www.woodcliff-lake.com
Ind.	Per pupil	District spending	Rank (*)	K-8 average	%± vs. average
1A	Total Spending	$20,319	77	$18,891	7.6%
1	Budgetary Cost	15,804	76	14,159	11.6%
2	Classroom Instruction	8,589	44	8,659	−0.8%
6	Support Services	3,365	84	2,167	55.3%
8	Administrative Cost	1,976	83	1,547	27.7%
10	Operations & Maintenance	1,727	60	1,612	7.1%
13	Extracurricular Activities	143	75	104	37.5%
16	Median Teacher Salary	60,580	37	61,136
Data from NJDoE 2014 Taxpayers' Guide to Education Spending. *Of K-8 districts with more than 750 students. Lowest spending=1; Highest=84

The Woodcliff Lake Public Schools is a community public school district that serves students in pre-kindergarten through eighth grade from Woodcliff Lake, in Bergen County, in the U.S. state of New Jersey.

As of the 2023–24 school year, the district, comprised of two schools, had an enrollment of 780 students and 73.0 classroom teachers (on an FTE basis), for a student–teacher ratio of 10.7:1.

The district had been classified by the New Jersey Department of Education as being in District Factor Group "J", the-highest of eight groupings. District Factor Groups organize districts statewide to allow comparison by common socioeconomic characteristics of the local districts. From lowest socioeconomic status to highest, the categories are A, B, CD, DE, FG, GH, I and J.

For ninth through twelfth grades, Woodcliff Lake public school students attend Pascack Hills High School, along with those from Montvale. The school is part of the Pascack Valley Regional High School District, which serves students from Hillsdale and River Vale at Pascack Valley High School. As of the 2023–24 school year, the high school had an enrollment of 955 students and 93.8 classroom teachers (on an FTE basis), for a student–teacher ratio of 10.2:1.

== Awards and recognition ==
For the 2005-06 school year, Woodcliff Middle School was named a "Star School" by the New Jersey Department of Education, the highest honor that a New Jersey school can achieve.

== Schools ==
The schools in the district (with 2023–24 enrollment data from the National Center for Education Statistics) are:

Elementary school

- Dorchester Elementary School with 508 students in grades Pre-K through 5
  - Stefanie Marsich, principal

Middle school

- Woodcliff Middle School which had 265 students in grades 6–8
  - Michael Andriulli, principal

== Administration ==
Core members of the district's administration are:

- Lauren Barbelet, superintendent
- Matthew L. Lynaugh, business administrator and board secretary

== Board of education ==
The district's board of education, comprised of nine members, sets policy and oversees the fiscal and educational operation of the district through its administration. As a Type II school district, the board's trustees are elected directly by voters to serve three-year terms of office on a staggered basis, with three seats up for election each year held (since 2012) as part of the November general election. The board appoints a superintendent to oversee the district's day-to-day operations and a business administrator to supervise the business functions of the district.
