= Edith Margaret Faulstich =

American journalist

- Born: May 22, 1907; Flatbush, Brooklyn, New York
- Died: September 4, 1972 (aged 65); Yonkers, New York
- Education: Park Ridge High School, Park Ridge, NJ
- Children: Donald Harry Fisher, Stephen Alrion Merritt Fisher
- Parent(s): Andrew Case VanderPoel, Margaretha Bollinger
- Family: Alice M. Fisher, Paul Fisher, Cassandra Lynn (Fisher)Roberts, Andrew Case Fisher, Edith VanderPoel Fisher, Diana Fisher, Laura Fisher, James Fisher
- Engineering career
- Institutions: Postal History Society of the Americas
- Projects: Campaigned to have postal history accepted as a valid category at philatelic exhibitions.
- Awards: APS Hall of Fame

External image
- image icon

Edith Margaret Faulstich (May 22, 1907 – September 4, 1972) of New Jersey and New York City, was a philatelist and philatelic journalist who specialized in postal history and postal covers. She encouraged the development of that field in philately.

== Family history ==
She was born as Edith Margaret VanderPoel, daughter of Andrew Case VanderPoel and Margaretha Bollinger.

As a child, Faulstich developed the nickname "Dee." The development and transformation of the name came from her Swiss-German grandfather, Conrad Bollinger who was from Beringen. Whenever he tried to pronounce "Edith" it always came out "Edit." It sounded like he was always saying "eat it". To avoid embarrassment, he began calling her Dee. Thereafter, and throughout the remainder of her life, she was known as "Dee."

Faulstich's family history dates back to the 16th century, with the Bollinger's coming from Berigen, Switzerland and the VanderPoel's coming from Holland. The VanderPoel family is derived from the VanderPoels who owned property and sawmills on the Hudson River and lived within the surrounding area of Kinderhook, Columbia County, New York Ref. Map of the Division of Kinderhoock, Patent Granted in 1686.

Raised in Montvale, New Jersey, she attended Park Ridge High School and New York University.

== Collecting interests ==
Faulstich started stamp collecting as a hobby with her two young sons. In the beginning, it was a way for Faulstich and her children to do something together. Faulstich "had a 'yen,' a longing, to write" and she was not a shy person.

In the beginning with her philatelic work, Faulstich wanted to know how people communicated before preprinted government stamps, before 1840. She then wanted to promote and increase awareness about the value and need for postal history.

Faulstich spent 25 years researching the postal mail of the American Expeditionary Forces who were forgotten about and left in Siberia, from 1917 to about 1920, after World War I. Her research, files and letters were donated to Stanford University, after her death. And, a very limited publication of her book was edited and published privately by her sons for the families of the Siberian soldiers she corresponded with.

=== Postal history of the world ===
Many of Faulstich's postal history collections were rated as world class. Possession of her list of collections is noted in the Robert A. Segal Auction 120 East 54th Street, New York, NY 10220. The following is a sample partial list of a few of Edith M. Faulstich's collections.

- Two of her most important collections were Canadian Expeditionary Forces in Siberia during World War I and American Expeditionary Forces in Siberia. see reference, Hover Institute, Stanford University, California,
- Earliest Forms of Written Communication
- Covers of a Great Age. 14th-17th Century, Europe and Mediterranean Areas (Italy, Central Europe, Belgium, France, Netherlands, Greece, Switzerland
- "Cito" Covers which were considered the first regular special delivery covers. This is also a subject upon which Faulstich wrote a monograph based on her collection
- The Evolution of the Envelope. A specialized collection of 37 cover from the old parchment scrolls, self-tied strips of parchment up to 1830 when the envelope was well developed
- French Civilian Covers
- French Autographs
- War Covers
- North Russia "Operation Polar Bear"
- Disaster Covers
- America-Colonial Covers Before French & Indian War (1677–1742)
- French & Indian War Covers (1755–1763)
- Canada Covers (1767–1814)
- The McKenzie Rebellion Letters ( 1837–1938)
- Prisoner of War Covers, Siberia
- United States, Stampless Covers
- Ship & Railroad Markings
- Westerns & Territorials
- Valentine Covers
- Civil War Patriotic Covers
- 1860 Pictorial Issue
- Bank Note Issues
- Switzerland
- Texas Covers Specialized
- United States PostMaster Provisionals

== Philatelic literature ==
In addition she wrote stamp columns for the following newspapers and publications:

1) 'Newark Sunday News' for 26 year (Nov. 24, 1946–1972),
2) 'The Record", Hackensack, New Jersey ( 1961–1966),
3) 'Bergen Evening Record" (January 16, 1922 -Sept 14, 1968),

Faulstich was also editor of:
4) Postal History Journal from May 1957 (Vol.1. No.1) to 1967,
5) Western Stamp Collector,
6) Covers, and
7) The Essay-Proof Journal.

== Philatelic activity ==
Faulstich was a founding member of the Postal History Society of the Americas (later renamed the Postal History Society (PHS), Inc.) and dedicated much of her time campaigning for the acceptance of postal history as a valid category of philatelic exhibitions. She was the first woman president of the PHS.

== Honors and awards ==
Edith Faulstich was inducted into the American Philatelic Society Hall of Fame in 1973.

== See also ==
- Philately
- Philatelic literature
