= Raymond Gilmartin =

American businessman

- Born: March 6, 1941 (age 84); Sayville, New York
- Occupation(s): professor at Harvard Business School, former President & CEO of Merck & Co, Inc.
- Board member of: Microsoft, General Mills
- Spouse(s): Gladys Higham, 1965
- Children: Three children

Raymond V. Gilmartin (born March 6, 1941) is an American former business executive and an adjunct professor of management practice at the Harvard Business School.

== Biography ==
=== Early life ===
Raymond Gilmartin was born on March 6, 1941, in Sayville, New York. He received his B.S. in electrical engineering from Union College in 1963, being the first member of his immediate family to attend college, and an MBA from Harvard Business School in 1968. In the interim between colleges, he worked as an engineer at Kodak and met his future wife.

=== Family life ===
Gilmartin married Gladys Higham in 1965, and had three children as of 2005. Gilmartin has been a resident of Park Ridge, New Jersey.

=== Career ===
After graduation from Harvard, Gilmartin worked as a consultant at Arthur D. Little for eight years.

Gilmartin joined Becton Dickinson (BD) in 1976 as a vice president and rose to hold president, chairman and CEO positions at the company by the time of his departure in 1994. Gilmartin's work at BD has been considered instrumental in supporting the company's transition from a regional to a multinational company. Gilmartin then moved to Merck & Co, Inc., hired as president and CEO in 1994, and adding the role of chairman the same year upon retirement of P. Roy Vagelos.

The style of management that I have, basically, is to recognize the fact that I'll never be as expert in any of the areas of the company as some of my direct reports are.

— Raymond Gilmartin, Interview for The Record (Bergen County, New Jersey), October 2003

Gilmartin's new position at Merck was a shock to pharmaceutical industry analysts as he was the first CEO ever recruited from outside the company since its founding in 1891, and despite his having managed at BD, Gilmartin was considered a newcomer to the pharmaceutical industry. During his tenure, Gilmartin oversaw Merck's response to two patent cliffs and consistently rejected the prospect of merging the company with a rival and maintained an emphasis on original research as opposed to joining a growing trend of in-licensing late-state drug prospects. Gilmartin's management style was characterized by delegation of day-to-day activities while maintaining a focus on strategic planning and decision making.

Gilmartin served at Merck until May 2005, a period which included the Vioxx scandal; thereafter, he remained with Merck in an advisory capacity until April 2006, when his retirement became effective. Late in his tenure at Merck, in 2004, Gilmartin received an LL.D. (honorary) from Kean University of New Jersey.

In July 2006, Gilmartin became a professor of management practices at Harvard Business School. Gilmartin has also served as a member of the board of advisors to the dean of Harvard Business School.

Gilmartin joined the board of directors of Microsoft in 2001. Other boards that Gilmartin has served on include that of directors at General Mills, the National Association of Corporate Directors and the United Negro College Fund, and trustees at the American Enterprise Institute. Gilmartin has also served as a chair of PhRMA and president of IFPMA.
