= Park Ridge, New Jersey =

Borough in Bergen County, New Jersey, US

- Borough
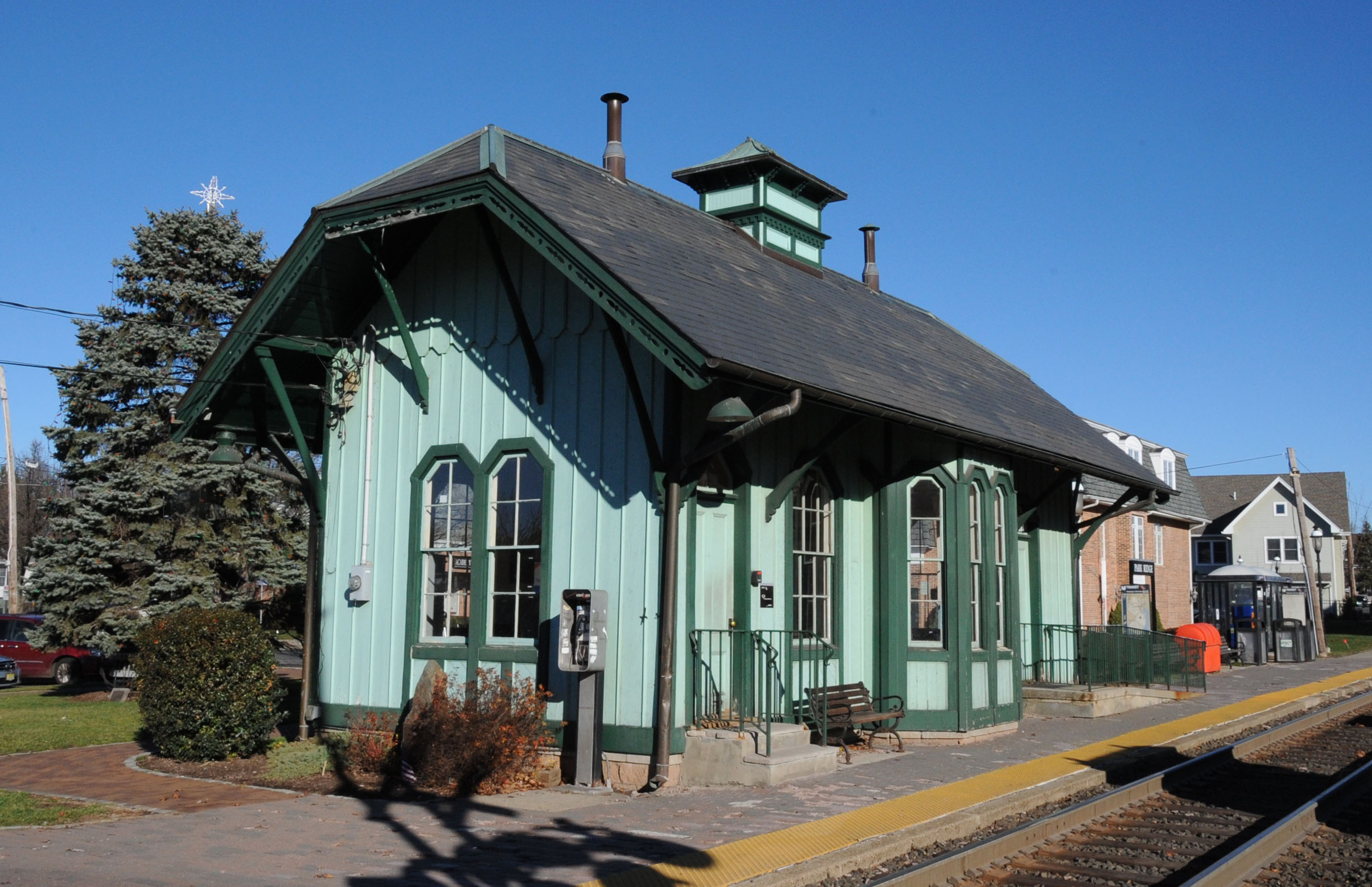
- Park Ridge Station

- Seal

- Location of Park Ridge in Bergen County highlighted in red (left). Inset map: Location of Bergen County in New Jersey highlighted in orange (right).

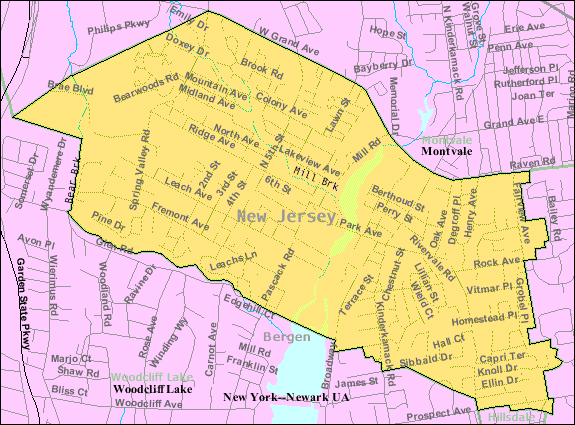
- Census Bureau map of Park Ridge, New Jersey

- Location in Bergen County Location in New Jersey Location in the United States
- Coordinates: 41.036°N 74.044°W
- Country: United States
- State: New Jersey
- County: Bergen
- Incorporated: May 15, 1894

Government
  - Type: Borough
  - Body: Borough Council
  - Mayor: Keith Misciagna (D, term ends December 31, 2027)
  - Administrator: Magdalena Giandomenico
  - Municipal clerk: Magdalena Giandomenico

Area
  - Total: 2.63 sq mi (6.81 km^{2})
  - Land: 2.61 sq mi (6.75 km^{2})
  - Water: 0.019 sq mi (0.05 km^{2}) 0.80%
  - Rank: 367th of 565 in state 36th of 70 in county
- Elevation: 144 ft (44 m)

Population (2020)
  - Total: 8,883
  - Estimate (2024): 9,634
  - Rank: 267th of 565 in state 45th of 70 in county
  - Density: 3,407.4/sq mi (1,315.6/km^{2})
  - Rank: 199th of 565 in state 41st of 70 in county
- Time zone: UTC−05:00 (Eastern (EST))
  - Summer (DST): UTC−04:00 (Eastern (EDT))
- ZIP Code: 07656
- Area code: 201
- FIPS code: 3400356130
- GNIS feature ID: 0885341
- Website: www.parkridgeboro.com

Park Ridge is a borough in Bergen County, in the U.S. state of New Jersey. As of the 2020 United States census, the borough's population was 8,883, its highest decennial census count ever and an increase of 238 (+2.8%) from the 2010 census count of 8,645, which in turn had reflected a decline of 63 (−0.7%) from the 8,708 counted at the 2000 census. Park Ridge has continued to grow in population since the 2020 census, by 557 (+6.3%) to an estimated 9,440 residents as of 2023.

== History ==
Park Ridge was created as a borough by an act of the New Jersey Legislature on May 15, 1894, from portions of Washington Township, based on the results of a referendum held the previous day. The borough was formed during the "Boroughitis" phenomenon then sweeping through Bergen County, in which 26 boroughs were formed in the county in 1894 alone. Park Ridge obtained a portion of River Vale (July 15, 1929), exchanged portions with Woodcliff Lake (December 12, 1955), received part of Washington Township (November 26, 1956), exchanged portions with Hillsdale (February 10, 1958) and Woodcliff Lake (June 9, 1958) and received another part of Washington Township (August 11, 1958). The borough's name derives from its location.

Park Ridge's Pascack Historical Society Museum, at 19 Ridge Avenue, houses the world's only wampum drilling machine. This wooden artifact was made in Park Ridge by the Campbell Brothers who invented a way to drill through long pieces of hair pipe shells so that they could be strung and worn as breast plates by the Plains Indians, among others. Needing water for the operation, the industrious brothers leased a woolen mill that stood on the Pascack Brook. When that burned down they built their own mill farther down Pascack Creek on their land and another shop on Pascack Road near their homestead. Both buildings housed drilling machines on their second floors where they were safe from prying eyes, as the two machines had not been patented. In the early 19th century, John Jacob Astor purchased wampum from the Campbells to trade with the Native Americans of the Pacific Northwest whose beaver pelts he turned into men's hats. The best years for the wampum business were between 1835 and 1866. The drilling machine can be seen at the Pascack Historical Society Museum on Wednesdays from 10 a.m. until noon and Sundays from 1–4 p.m. Admission is free.

=== Historic sites ===
Park Ridge is home to the following locations on the National Register of Historic Places:

- John G. Ackerson House – 142 Pascack Road (added 1983)
- Isaac Debaun House – 124 Rivervale Road (added 1983)
- Park Ridge Station – Hawthorne and Park Avenue (added 1984)
- Peter D. Perry House – 107 Rivervale Road (added 1983)
- Wortendyke Barn – 13 Pascack Road (added 1973)
- Frederick Wortendyke House – 12 Pascack Road (added 1983)

== Geography ==
According to the United States Census Bureau, the borough had a total area of 2.63 square miles (6.81 km^{2}), including 2.61 square miles (6.75 km^{2}) of land and 0.02 square miles (0.05 km^{2}) of water (0.80%).

The borough is a part of the Pascack Valley region of Bergen County. It is bordered by the Bergen County municipalities of Hillsdale, Montvale, River Vale and Woodcliff Lake. Although no major highways run through the borough, it is serviced by the Garden State Parkway at exits 168, 171 and 172 in Washington Township, Woodcliff Lake and Montvale, respectively.

== Demographics ==
Historical population
Census	Pop.	Note	%±
1900	870		—
1910	1,401		61.0%
1920	1,481		5.7%
1930	2,229		50.5%
1940	2,519		13.0%
1950	3,189		26.6%
1960	6,389		100.3%
1970	8,709		36.3%
1980	8,515		−2.2%
1990	8,102		−4.9%
2000	8,708		7.5%
2010	8,645		−0.7%
2020	8,883		2.8%
2024 (est.)	9,634	▲	8.5%
Population sources: 1900–1920 1900–1910; 1910–1930 1900–2020; 2000 2010 2020

=== Racial and ethnic composition ===
Park Ridge borough, New Jersey – Racial and ethnic composition Note: the US Census treats Hispanic/Latino as an ethnic category. This table excludes Latinos from the racial categories and assigns them to a separate category. Hispanics/Latinos may be of any race.
Race / Ethnicity (NH = Non-Hispanic)	Pop 2000	Pop 2010	Pop 2020	% 2000	% 2010	% 2020
White alone (NH)	7,778	7,288	6,972	89.32%	84.30%	78.49%
Black or African American alone (NH)	67	80	91	0.77%	0.93%	1.02%
Native American or Alaska Native alone (NH)	6	5	2	0.07%	0.06%	0.02%
Asian alone (NH)	336	524	631	3.86%	6.06%	7.10%
Native Hawaiian or Pacific Islander alone (NH)	1	2	0	0.01%	0.02%	0.00%
Other race alone (NH)	2	14	33	0.02%	0.16%	0.37%
Mixed race or Multiracial (NH)	55	63	218	0.63%	0.73%	2.45%
Hispanic or Latino (any race)	463	669	936	5.32%	7.74%	10.54%
Total	8,708	8,645	8,883	100.00%	100.00%	100.00%

=== 2020 census ===
As of the 2020 census, Park Ridge had a population of 8,883. The median age was 47.1 years. 19.9% of residents were under the age of 18 and 22.3% of residents were 65 years of age or older. For every 100 females there were 91.7 males, and for every 100 females age 18 and older there were 88.6 males age 18 and older.

100.0% of residents lived in urban areas, while 0.0% lived in rural areas.

There were 3,310 households in Park Ridge, of which 29.9% had children under the age of 18 living in them. Of all households, 61.4% were married-couple households, 13.3% were households with a male householder and no spouse or partner present, and 21.9% were households with a female householder and no spouse or partner present. About 23.5% of all households were made up of individuals and 12.4% had someone living alone who was 65 years of age or older.

There were 3,435 housing units, of which 3.6% were vacant. The homeowner vacancy rate was 0.7% and the rental vacancy rate was 4.6%.

=== 2010 census ===
The 2010 United States census counted 8,645 people, 3,283 households, and 2,351 families in the borough. The population density was 3,348.6 per square mile (1,292.9/km^{2}). There were 3,428 housing units at an average density of 1,327.8 per square mile (512.7/km^{2}). The racial makeup was 89.14% (7,706) White, 1.04% (90) Black or African American, 0.22% (19) Native American, 6.07% (525) Asian, 0.02% (2) Pacific Islander, 2.58% (223) from other races, and 0.93% (80) from two or more races. Hispanic or Latino of any race were 7.74% (669) of the population.

Of the 3,283 households, 30.9% had children under the age of 18; 62.0% were married couples living together; 7.2% had a female householder with no husband present and 28.4% were non-families. Of all households, 25.0% were made up of individuals and 12.2% had someone living alone who was 65 years of age or older. The average household size was 2.57 and the average family size was 3.08.

22.9% of the population were under the age of 18, 5.0% from 18 to 24, 21.8% from 25 to 44, 31.1% from 45 to 64, and 19.2% who were 65 years of age or older. The median age was 45.2 years. For every 100 females, the population had 93.3 males. For every 100 females ages 18 and older there were 89.6 males.

The Census Bureau's 2006–2010 American Community Survey showed that (in 2010 inflation-adjusted dollars) median household income was $104,053 (with a margin of error of +/− $7,870) and the median family income was $118,984 (+/− $7,463). Males had a median income of $85,242 (+/− $13,024) versus $65,216 (+/− $12,814) for females. The per capita income for the borough was $46,695 (+/− $3,650). About 1.1% of families and 1.3% of the population were below the poverty line, including none of those under age 18 and 0.5% of those age 65 or over.

Same-sex couples headed 11 households in 2010, an increase from the 7 counted in the 2000 Census.

=== 2000 census ===
As of the 2000 United States census, there were 8,708 people, 3,161 households, and 2,389 families residing in the borough. The population density was 3,353.3 inhabitants per square mile (1,294.7/km^{2}). There were 3,258 housing units at an average density of 1,254.6 per square mile (484.4/km^{2}). The racial makeup of the borough was 93.48% White, 0.86% African American, 0.14% Native American, 3.86% Asian, 0.02% Pacific Islander, 0.73% from other races, and 0.91% from two or more races. Hispanic or Latino people of any race were 5.32% of the population.

There were 3,161 households, out of which 33.3% had children under the age of 18 living with them, 65.9% were married couples living together, 7.5% had a female householder with no husband present, and 24.4% were non-families. 21.3% of all households were made up of individuals, and 8.2% had someone living alone who was 65 years of age or older. The average household size was 2.67 and the average family size was 3.12.

In the borough the population was spread out, with 23.5% under the age of 18, 5.6% from 18 to 24, 28.6% from 25 to 44, 26.2% from 45 to 64, and 16.2% who were 65 years of age or older. The median age was 41 years. For every 100 females, there were 92.2 males. For every 100 females age 18 and over, there were 90.4 males.

The median income for a household in the borough was $66,632, and the median income for a family was $97,294. Males had a median income of $71,042 versus $40,714 for females. The per capita income for the borough was $40,351. About 1.2% of families and 3.1% of the population were below the poverty line, including 2.3% of those under age 18 and 2.1% of those age 65 or over.

== Economy ==
The Hertz Corporation, a car rental company, had been headquartered in Park Ridge and was the borough's largest single taxpayer. On May 7, 2013, Hertz announced that the firm was moving their corporate HQ to Estero, Florida, and would keep certain operations in Park Ridge.

Sony Corporation of America moved its R&D and engineering facility out of Park Ridge in 2015 when it sold the building to Paramus-based Hornrock Properties.

== Government ==
=== Local government ===
Park Ridge is governed under the borough form of New Jersey municipal government, which is used in 218 municipalities (of the 564) statewide, making it the most common form of government in New Jersey. The governing body is comprised of a mayor and a borough council with all positions elected at-large on a partisan basis as part of the November general election. A mayor is elected directly by the voters to a four-year term of office. The borough council includes six members, who are elected to serve three-year terms on a staggered basis, with two seats coming up for election each year in a three-year cycle. The borough form of government used by Park Ridge is a "weak mayor / strong council" government in which council members act as the legislative body with the mayor presiding at meetings and voting only in the event of a tie. The mayor can veto ordinances subject to an override by a two-thirds majority vote of the council. The mayor makes committee and liaison assignments for council members, and most appointments are made by the mayor with the advice and consent of the council.

As of 2023, the mayor of the Borough of Park Ridge is Democrat Keith Misciagna, whose term of office ends December 31, 2023. Members of the Park Ridge Borough Council are Council President William Fenwick (R, 2023), Matthew J. Capilli (D, 2024), John M. Cozzi (R, 2023), John P. Ferguson (D, 2024), Bruce Goldsmith (R, 2025) and Greg C. Hoffman (R, 2025).

In May 2017, the council selected Keith Misciagna to fill the vacant mayoral seat, following the resignation of Terry Maguire the previous month in the face of criticism of the way he had dealt with suits over affordable housing in the borough. In turn, the council selected Michael Mintz from a list of three candidates nominated by the Democratic municipal committee to fill Misciagna's vacant council seat that expired in December 2017.

In February 2016, the borough council selected Donna Szot from a list of three candidates nominated by the Republican municipal committee to fill the seat expiring in December 2016 that had become vacant following the resignation of Ryan Cangialosi the previous month.

=== Federal, state and county representation ===
Park Ridge is located in the 5th Congressional District and is part of New Jersey's 39th state legislative district.

For the 119th United States Congress, New Jersey's 5th congressional district is represented by Josh Gottheimer (D, Wyckoff). New Jersey is represented in the United States Senate by Democrats Cory Booker (Newark, term ends 2027) and Andy Kim (Moorestown, term ends 2031).

For the 2026–2027 session, the 39th legislative district of the New Jersey Legislature is represented in the State Senate by Holly Schepisi (R, River Vale) and in the General Assembly by Robert Auth (R, Old Tappan) and John V. Azzariti (R, Saddle River).

Bergen County is governed by a directly elected County Executive, with legislative functions performed by a Board of County Commissioners comprised of seven members who are elected at-large to three-year terms in partisan elections on a staggered basis, with either two or three seats coming up for election each November; a Chairman and Vice Chairman are selected from among its seven members at a reorganization meeting held every January. As of 2025, the county executive is James J. Tedesco III (D, Paramus), whose four-year term of office ends December 31, 2026.

Bergen County's Commissioners are Chair Mary J. Amoroso (D, Mahwah, 2025), Vice Chair Steven A. Tanelli (D, North Arlington, 2027), Chair Pro Tem Joan Voss (D, Fort Lee, 2026), Rafael Marte (D, Bergenfield, 2026), Germaine M. Ortiz (D, Emerson, 2025), Thomas J. Sullivan Jr. (D, Montvale, 2025) and Tracy Silna Zur (D, Franklin Lakes, 2027).

Bergen County's elected constitutional officials are Clerk John S. Hogan (D, Northvale, 2026), Sheriff Anthony Cureton (D, Englewood, 2027) and Surrogate Michael R. Dressler (D, Cresskill, 2026).

=== Politics ===
United States presidential election results for Park Ridge 2024 2020 2016 2012 2008 2004
Year	Republican		Democratic		Third party(ies)	
Year	No.	%	No.	%	No.	%
2024	2,874	52.15%	2,546	46.20%	91	1.65%
2020	2,880	50.13%	2,806	48.84%	59	1.03%
2016	2,619	53.73%	2,108	43.25%	147	3.02%
2012	2,682	57.28%	1,957	41.80%	43	0.92%
2008	2,735	56.24%	2,093	43.04%	35	0.72%
2004	2,697	57.46%	1,963	41.82%	34	0.72%

As of March 2011, there were a total of 5,800 registered voters in Park Ridge, of whom 1,462 (25.2% vs. 31.7% countywide) were registered as Democrats, 1,503 (25.9% vs. 21.1%) were registered as Republicans and 2,832 (48.8% vs. 47.1%) were registered as Unaffiliated. There were 3 voters registered as Libertarians or Greens. Among the borough's 2010 Census population, 67.1% (vs. 57.1% in Bergen County) were registered to vote, including 87.0% of those ages 18 and over (vs. 73.7% countywide).

In the 2016 presidential election, Republican Donald Trump received 2,619 votes (53.3% vs. 41.1% countywide), ahead of Democrat Hillary Clinton with 2,108 votes (42.9% vs. 54.2%) and other candidates with 185 votes (3.8% vs. 4.6%), among the 4,977 ballots cast by the borough's 6,395 registered voters, for a turnout of 77.8% (vs. 72.5% in Bergen County). In the 2012 presidential election, Republican Mitt Romney received 2,682 votes here (57.0% vs. 43.5% countywide), ahead of Democrat Barack Obama with 1,957 votes (41.6% vs. 54.8%) and other candidates with 43 votes (0.9% vs. 0.9%), among the 4,708 ballots cast by the borough's 6,080 registered voters, for a turnout of 77.4% (vs. 70.4% in Bergen County). In the 2008 presidential election, Republican John McCain received 2,735 votes here (55.8% vs. 44.5% countywide), ahead of Democrat Barack Obama with 2,093 votes (42.7% vs. 53.9%) and other candidates with 35 votes (0.7% vs. 0.8%), among the 4,901 ballots cast by the borough's 6,049 registered voters, for a turnout of 81.0% (vs. 76.8% in Bergen County). In the 2004 presidential election, Republican George W. Bush received 2,697 votes here (57.4% vs. 47.2% countywide), ahead of Democrat John Kerry with 1,963 votes (41.7% vs. 51.7%) and other candidates with 34 votes (0.7% vs. 0.7%), among the 4,702 ballots cast by the borough's 5,785 registered voters, for a turnout of 81.3% (vs. 76.9% in the whole county).

Gubernatorial election results for Park Ridge
Year	Republican		Democratic		Third party(ies)	
Year	No.	%	No.	%	No.	%
2025	2,347	51.94%	2,158	47.75%	14	0.31%
2021	2,035	55.85%	1,591	43.66%	18	0.49%
2017	1,717	55.35%	1,346	43.39%	39	1.26%
2013	2,193	70.61%	886	28.53%	27	0.87%
2009	1,906	55.96%	1,317	38.67%	183	5.37%
2005	1,544	52.89%	1,323	45.32%	52	1.78%

In the 2013 gubernatorial election, Republican Chris Christie received 70.6% of the vote (2,193 cast), ahead of Democrat Barbara Buono with 28.5% (886 votes), and other candidates with 0.9% (27 votes), among the 3,176 ballots cast by the borough's 5,879 registered voters (70 ballots were spoiled), for a turnout of 54.0%. In the 2009 gubernatorial election, Republican Chris Christie received 1,906 votes here (55.4% vs. 45.8% countywide), ahead of Democrat Jon Corzine with 1,317 votes (38.3% vs. 48.0%), Independent Chris Daggett with 162 votes (4.7% vs. 4.7%) and other candidates with 21 votes (0.6% vs. 0.5%), among the 3,443 ballots cast by the borough's 5,928 registered voters, yielding a 58.1% turnout (vs. 50.0% in the county).

United States Senate election results for Park Ridge1
Year	Republican		Democratic		Third party(ies)	
Year	No.	%	No.	%	No.	%
2024	2,729	51.94%	2,444	46.52%	81	1.54%
2018	2,002	54.92%	1,546	42.41%	97	2.66%
2012	2,374	54.92%	1,883	43.56%	66	1.53%
2006	1,902	57.95%	1,327	40.43%	53	1.61%

United States Senate election results for Park Ridge2
Year	Republican		Democratic		Third party(ies)	
Year	No.	%	No.	%	No.	%
2020	2,846	50.43%	2,735	48.47%	62	1.10%
2014	1,432	50.60%	1,360	48.06%	38	1.34%
2013	1,051	50.90%	1,003	48.57%	11	0.53%
2008	2,405	53.97%	2,007	45.04%	44	0.99%

== Education ==
The Park Ridge Public Schools serve students in pre-kindergarten through twelfth grade. As of the 2021–22 school year, the district, comprised of three schools, had an enrollment of 1,223 students and 123.8 classroom teachers (on an FTE basis), for a student–teacher ratio of 9.9:1. Schools in the district (with 2021–22 enrollment data from the National Center for Education Statistics) are East Brook Elementary School with 318 students in grades K-6, West Ridge Elementary School with 337 students in grades PreK-6 and Park Ridge High School with 548 students in grades 7–12. The high school was the 14th-ranked public high school in New Jersey (third-highest in Bergen County) out of 328 schools statewide in New Jersey Monthly magazine's September 2012 cover story on the state's "Top Public High Schools", after being ranked 18th in 2010 out of 322 schools listed. Athletic programs at the high school include baseball, basketball, football, soccer, softball, track and tennis.

Public school students from the borough, and all of Bergen County, are eligible to attend the secondary education programs offered by the Bergen County Technical Schools, which include the Bergen County Academies in Hackensack, and the Bergen Tech campus in Teterboro or Paramus. The district offers programs on a shared-time or full-time basis, with admission based on a selective application process and tuition covered by the student's home school district.

Our Lady of Mercy Academy is a K–8 Catholic school which operates in Park Ridge under the auspices of the Roman Catholic Archdiocese of Newark.

== Religion ==
Houses of worship in Park Ridge include:

- First Congregational Church of Park Ridge (United Church of Christ)
- Our Lady of Mercy Church
- Park Ridge United Methodist Church
- Pascack Reformed Church
- Temple Beth Sholom of Pascack Valley

== Transportation ==
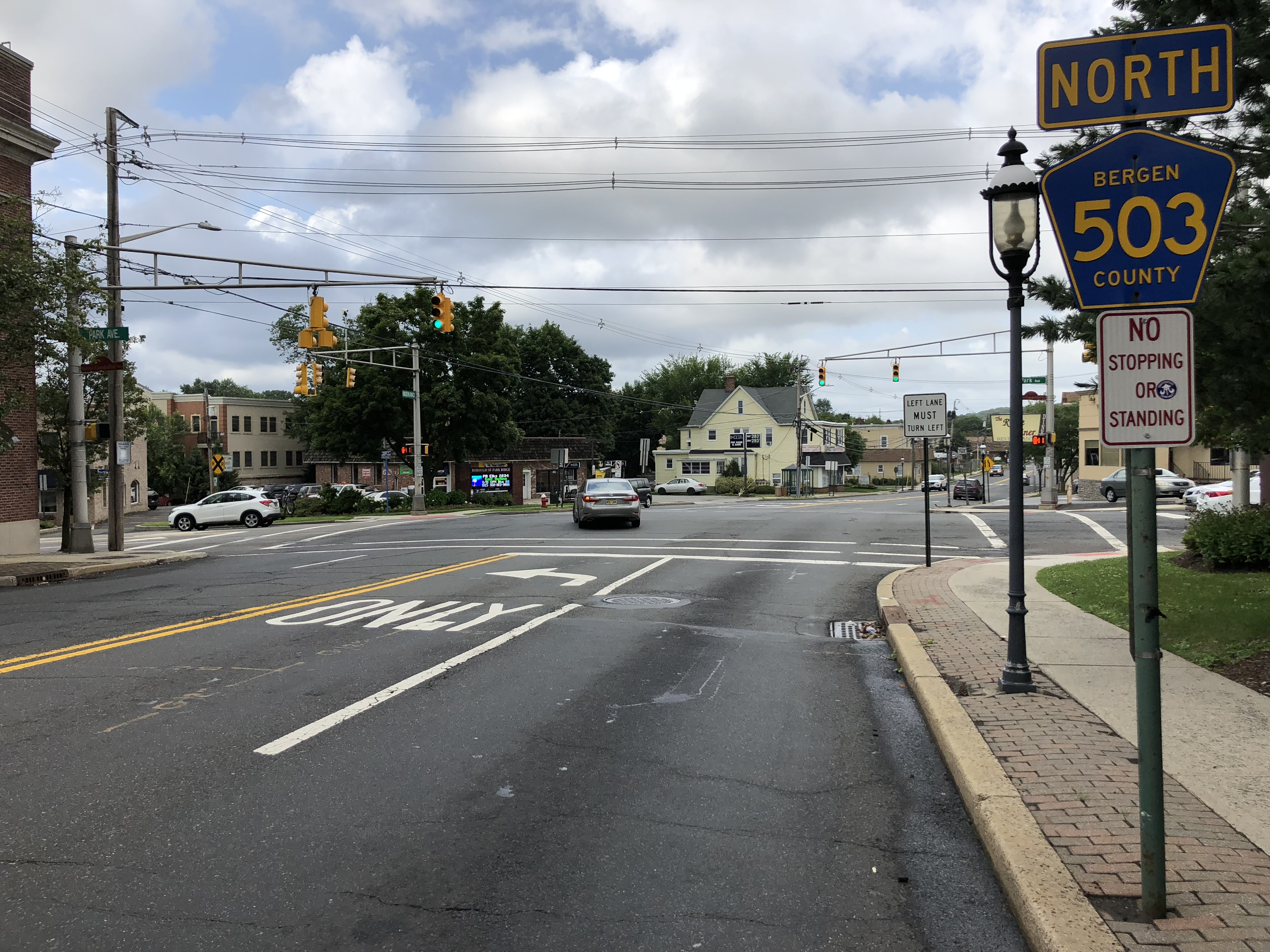
County Route 503 in Park Ridge

In July 2015, Park Ridge was designated as one of 30 transit villages statewide, qualifying it for incentives at the borough's train station and commuter lots, which will get additional access for bicycles and pedestrians.

=== Roads and highways ===
As of May 2010, the borough had a total of 38.91 miles (62.62 km) of roadways, of which 31.94 miles (51.40 km) were maintained by the municipality and 6.97 miles (11.22 km) by Bergen County.

County Route 503, which runs for 18 miles (29 km) from New Jersey Route 120 to the New York State border, passes through Park Ridge. It is well known and posted as Kinderkamack Road, which was a trail used by the Lenape Native Americans, whose name signified that it was a place (the suffix "ack") where ceremonial dances or prayers ("kintekaye") were made.

Park Ridge can be accessed via exit 172 on the Garden State Parkway.

=== Public transportation ===
Park Ridge is served by NJ Transit on the Pascack Valley Line at the Park Ridge station. The station is located at Hawthorne and Park Avenues though is also accessible from Broadway. This line runs north–south to Hoboken Terminal with connections via the Secaucus Junction transfer station to New Jersey Transit one-stop service to New York Penn Station and to other NJ Transit rail service. Connections are available at the Hoboken Terminal to other New Jersey Transit rail lines, the PATH train at the Hoboken PATH station, New York Waterways ferry service to the World Financial Center and other destinations and Hudson-Bergen Light Rail service.

Rockland Coaches provides service on the 11T/11AT and the 47 routes to the Port Authority Bus Terminal in Midtown Manhattan.

== Media ==
PKRG-TV, the public-access television cable TV station in Park Ridge, has produced and documented many shows over its history. They continue to produce a weekly live show every Monday night in addition to broadcasting special events in the town such as parades, sporting events, school plays, and charity events. Rolf Wahl, a borough resident, provided most of the guidance, technical knowledge and foresight for the station. The studio also hosted a series of shows entitled Behind The Badge which provided residents with an insight into the way the police department works. It included a tour of the police station and police cruiser and also an overview of programs the department works on to improve the welfare of the community, e.g. anti-drug programs and computer crime awareness.

== The Bear's Nest ==
The Bear's Nest is a luxury gated community in Park Ridge. It has town house-style houses with luxury amenities including (in some houses) elevators. A community clubhouse is available for residents, along with a pool, multiple tennis courts and a floral park. Noted residents of the development have included President Richard M. Nixon and his wife, Pat Nixon; Raymond V. Gilmartin, current Microsoft board member; and Tom Coughlin, former coach of the New York Giants and Joe Valenza, New York Yankees Fantasy Camp Hall of Fame Inductee and Founder of Virtue Risk Partners.

== Emergency services ==
The Tri-Boro Volunteer Ambulance Corps provides EMS service to Park Ridge, Woodcliff Lake and Montvale. Tri-Boro is a non-profit group which provides free emergency service to those in the community who need it at any time. Its headquarters is located in Park Ridge near Mill Pond.

Park Ridge has a paid police department, which has been led by Chief Joseph J. Madden since 2007.

The Park Ridge Volunteer Fire Department dates back to 1898, created by community volunteers after a major fire destroyed a local factory. PRFD is part of Bergen County Fire Battalion 8 and dispatching is contracted to Ridgewood-based Northwest Bergen Central Dispatch.

== Notable people ==
People who were born in, residents of, or otherwise closely associated with Park Ridge include:

- Jedh Colby Barker (1945–1967), United States Marine Corps Lance Corporal who posthumously received the Medal of Honor for heroism during the Vietnam War
- Tom Coughlin (born 1946), former coach of the New York Giants and two-time Super Bowl Champion XLII XLVI
- Brian Cushing (born 1987), former linebacker for the Houston Texans
- Karen Duffy (born 1962), model and author
- George Washington Foster (1866–1923), pioneering African-American architect
- James Gandolfini (1961–2013), actor
- Raymond Gilmartin (born 1941), professor at Harvard Business School; member of the board of directors at Microsoft and General Mills; President and CEO of Merck & Co., 1994–2005
- Bill Griffeth (born 1956), financial journalist who had appeared on CNBC
- Kevin Herget (born 1991), professional baseball pitcher for the Tampa Bay Rays
- Augie Hoffmann (born 1981), football player, guard signed by the New Orleans Saints and Rutgers Scarlet Knights football coach.
- Stewart Krentzman (born 1951), business executive
- Ariel Nicholson (born 2001), model and LGBT rights activist
- Pat Nixon (1912–1993), former First Lady, wife of Richard Nixon
- Richard Nixon (1913–1994), 37th President of the United States
- Tomas J. Padilla, former member of the Bergen County Board of Chosen Freeholders
- Tom Papa (born 1968), comedian, actor, writer and television/radio host
- The Roches (Maggie, Terre, and Suzzy), singer-songwriters and recording artists
- Larry Rosen (1940–2015), entrepreneur, musician and recording engineer; best known for his work as a modern jazz producer and label owner
- Stephanie Ruhle (born 1975), MSNBC Live anchor and former editor-at-large for Bloomberg News
- Travis Stever (born 1978), lead guitarist of Coheed and Cambria
- Dyanne Thorne (1936–2020), actress, stage performer and vocalist known for her stage work in Las Vegas and as the lead actress in the Ilsa film franchise which began with Ilsa, She Wolf of the SS
- Matt Turner (born 1994), soccer goalkeeper for Crystal Palace F.C., who has represented the United States national team

== In popular culture ==
- Park Ridge was the filming site for the Nick GAS (Nickelodeon Games and Sports) segment, "Heroes of the Game". Locations included West Ridge Elementary School and Colony Field.

== Annual events ==
- Each Memorial Day, the Tri-Boro area consisting of Park Ridge, Woodcliff Lake, and Montvale participate in the annual Memorial Day Parade. The Park Ridge High School Marching Band participates in the parade and hand out candies as well.
- Each October, Park Ridge holds its own Ragamuffin parade. Children who are 12 and younger dress up in costumes while walking down from Depot Square on Park Avenue to Davies Field. Following the parade, there is a costume contest. The event also features games and music.
- Park Ridge has an annual holiday tree lighting in December, with musical performances by the Park Ridge High School choir and marching band. The event also has free refreshments, like popcorn and hot chocolate.

== Sources ==
- Municipal Incorporations of the State of New Jersey (according to Counties) prepared by the Division of Local Government, Department of the Treasury (New Jersey); December 1, 1958.
- Clayton, W. Woodford; and Nelson, William. History of Bergen and Passaic Counties, New Jersey, with Biographical Sketches of Many of its Pioneers and Prominent Men., Philadelphia: Everts and Peck, 1882.
- Harvey, Cornelius Burnham (ed.), Genealogical History of Hudson and Bergen Counties, New Jersey. New York: New Jersey Genealogical Publishing Co., 1900.
- Van Valen, James M. History of Bergen County, New Jersey. New York: New Jersey Publishing and Engraving Co., 1900.
- Westervelt, Frances A. (Frances Augusta), 1858–1942, History of Bergen County, New Jersey, 1630–1923, Lewis Historical Publishing Company, 1923.
