= Frederick Wortendyke House (Park Ridge, New Jersey) =

Historic house in New Jersey, United States

- U.S. National Register of Historic Places
- New Jersey Register of Historic Places
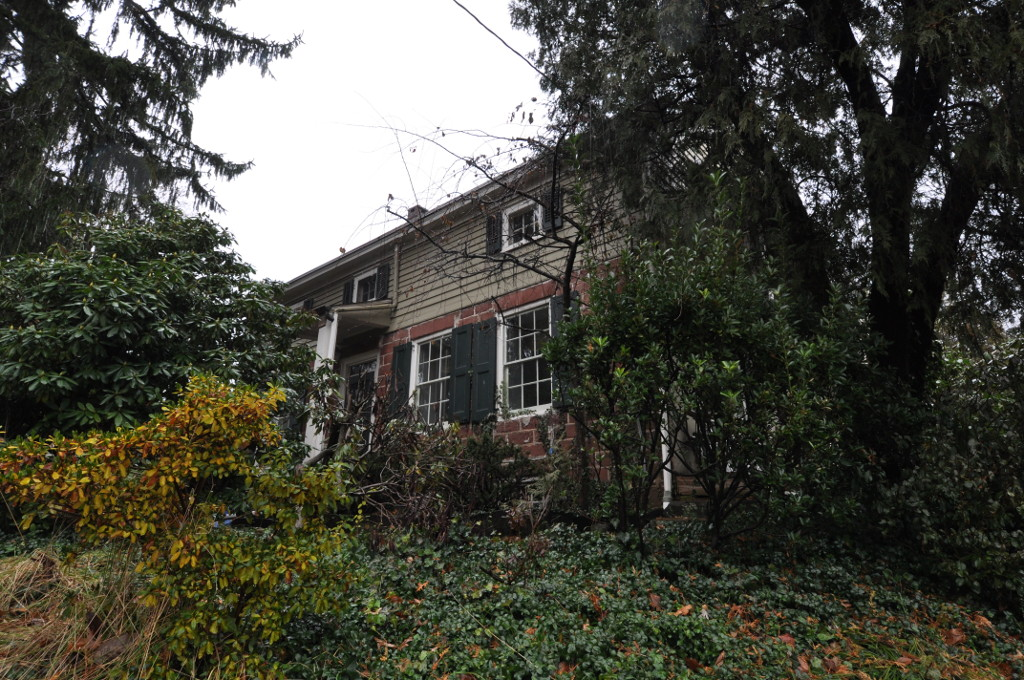
- Frederick Wortendyke House in 2018

- Location within Bergen County, New Jersey Location within New Jersey Location within the United States
- Location: 12 Pascack Road, Park Ridge, New Jersey
- Coordinates: 41°1′10″N 74°2′49″W
- Area: less than one acre
- Built: 1750
- MPS: Stone Houses of Bergen County TR
- NRHP reference No.: 83001592
- NJRHP No.: 631

Significant dates
- Added to NRHP: January 10, 1983
- Designated NJRHP: October 3, 1980

Frederick Wortendyke House is located in Park Ridge, Bergen County, New Jersey, United States. The house was built in 1750 and was added to the National Register of Historic Places on January 10, 1983.

== See also ==
- National Register of Historic Places listings in Bergen County, New Jersey
