= John G. Ackerson House =

Historic house in New Jersey, US

- U.S. National Register of Historic Places
- New Jersey Register of Historic Places
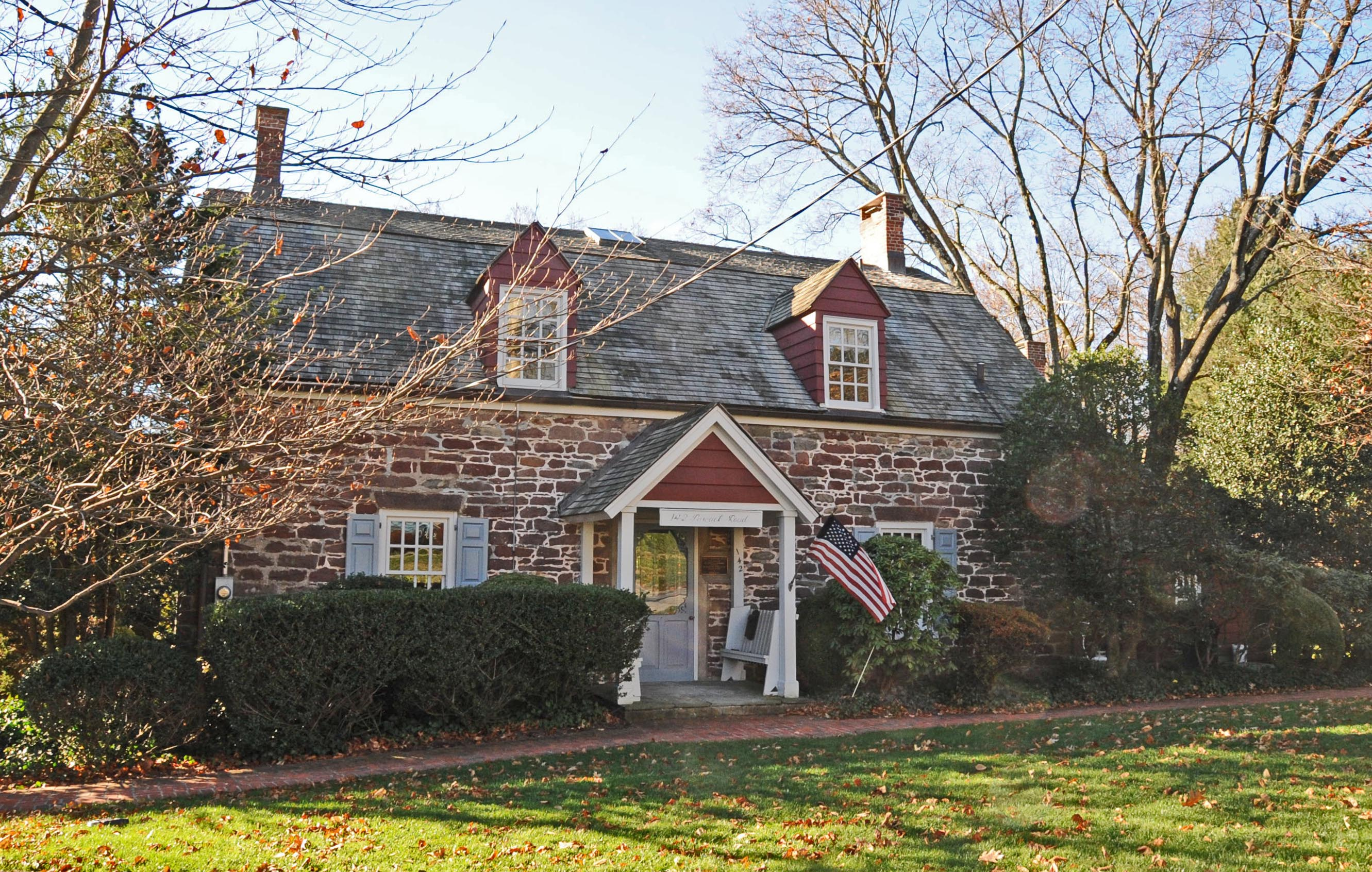
- John G. Ackerson House in 2015

- Location within Bergen County, New Jersey Location within New Jersey Location within the United States
- Location: 142 Pascack Road, Park Ridge, New Jersey
- Coordinates: 41°1′42″N 74°2′31″W
- Area: less than one acre
- MPS: Stone Houses of Bergen County TR
- NRHP reference No.: 83001458
- NJRHP No.: 624

Significant dates
- Added to NRHP: January 10, 1983
- Designated NJRHP: October 3, 1980

The John G. Ackerson House is located in Park Ridge, Bergen County, New Jersey, United States. The house was added to the National Register of Historic Places on January 10, 1983.

== See also ==
- National Register of Historic Places listings in Bergen County, New Jersey
