= Charles Kaufman (educator) =

American music educator

Charles Howard Kaufman (November 29, 1928 – March 17, 2016) was an American music educator who taught at the Mannes School of Music from 1975 to 2002.

== Early life ==
Kaufman was born in Manhattan on November 29, 1928, to Irving and Sophie (née Smith) Kaufman. He grew up in Mount Vernon, New York, and later served in the United States Army. After he married Rhoda Elkind, Kaufman worked for her father's sportswear company.

== Education and career ==
Kaufman quit working to return to school. He graduated from Columbia University's School of General Studies in 1965, and earned a master's degree and doctorate in musicology, under the tutelage of Gustave Reese at New York University. He started teaching music history and theory at Mannes in 1975. Four years later, the school's board announced a plan to merge Mannes with the Manhattan School of Music. Kaufman was named faculty spokesperson, and strongly opposed the merger. As a result of faculty protest, Mannes was not shut down. The New York State Board of Regents instead removed members of the school board from office and appointed Kaufman president of the institution. He oversaw the Mannes School's return to stable financial management and the integration of Mannes into The New School in 1989. He remained dean of Mannes College until 1996, when he was named a distinguished professor. Kaufman retired in 2002, and died in Hillsdale, New Jersey on March 17, 2016, at the age of 87.
