= Tice Farms =

Roadside stand in New Jersey

- Interactive map of Tice Farms
- State: New Jersey
- Country: United States of America
- Established: 1808
- Disestablished: mid-1990s
- Owner: Richard Tice

Tice Farms was a farm and roadside stand located in Woodcliff Lake, New Jersey. Founded in 1808, it was a local landmark which attracted families from miles around, especially in the fall, when it was noted for pumpkins, apple cider, fresh hot donuts and other fall products. With its across-the-street rival, Van Ripers Farm, intense traffic problems developed on fall weekends. It was the original home of The Greenhouse of Fear, a NJ haunted attraction which ran during Halloween season at that location in the mid-1990s.

Beginning in the 1970s, the farm was increasingly squeezed by local land development, and Richard Tice, the head of the family, repeatedly sold land to accommodate construction.

The site of the farm buildings, on Chestnut Ridge Road, is now occupied by the Tice's Corner mall.
