= Park Ridge Public Schools =

School district in Bergen County, New Jersey, US

Address
- 85 Pascack Road Park Ridge, Bergen County, New Jersey, 07656; United States
- Coordinates: 41.034469°N 74.042096°W

District information
- Grades: PreK to 12
- Superintendent: Robert Gamper
- Business administrator: Robert Wright
- Schools: 3

Students and staff
- Enrollment: 1,223 (as of 2021–22)
- Faculty: 123.8 FTEs
- Student–teacher ratio: 9.9:1

Other information
- District Factor Group: I
- Website: www.parkridgeschools.org
Ind.	Per pupil	District spending	Rank (*)	K-12 average	%± vs. average
1A	Total Spending	$22,395	43	$18,891	18.5%
1	Budgetary Cost	17,801	46	14,783	20.4%
2	Classroom Instruction	9,783	42	8,763	11.6%
6	Support Services	3,725	48	2,392	55.7%
8	Administrative Cost	1,982	46	1,485	33.5%
10	Operations & Maintenance	1,640	30	1,783	−8.0%
13	Extracurricular Activities	660	42	268	146.3%
16	Median Teacher Salary	67,011	42	64,043
Data from NJDoE 2014 Taxpayers' Guide to Education Spending. *Of K-12 districts with up to 1,800 students. Lowest spending=1; Highest=49

The Park Ridge Public Schools is a comprehensive community public school district that serves students in pre-kindergarten through twelfth grade from Park Ridge, in Bergen County, in the U.S. state of New Jersey.

As of the 2021–22 school year, the district, comprised of three schools, had an enrollment of 1,223 students and 123.8 classroom teachers (on an FTE basis), for a student–teacher ratio of 9.9:1.

The district is classified by the New Jersey Department of Education as being in District Factor Group "I", the second-highest of eight groupings. District Factor Groups organize districts statewide to allow comparison by common socioeconomic characteristics of the local districts. From lowest socioeconomic status to highest, the categories are A, B, CD, DE, FG, GH, I and J.

== Schools ==
Schools in the district (with 2021–22 enrollment data from the National Center for Education Statistics) are:

Elementary schools

- East Brook Elementary School with 318 students in grades K-6
  - Kevin Stokes, principal
- West Ridge Elementary School with 337 students in grades PreK-6
  - Melissa Ballaera, principal

High school

- Park Ridge High School with 548 students in grades 7-12
  - Troy Lederman, principal

== Administration ==
Core members of the district's administration are:

- Robert M. Gamper, superintendent
- Robert Wright, business administrator and board secretary

== Board of education ==
The district's board of education, comprised of seven members, sets policy and oversees the fiscal and educational operation of the district through its administration. As a Type II school district, the board's trustees are elected directly by voters to serve three-year terms of office on a staggered basis, with either two or three seats up for election each year held (since 2012) as part of the November general election. The board appoints a superintendent to oversee the district's day-to-day operations and a business administrator to supervise the business functions of the district.
