= David P. Patterson =

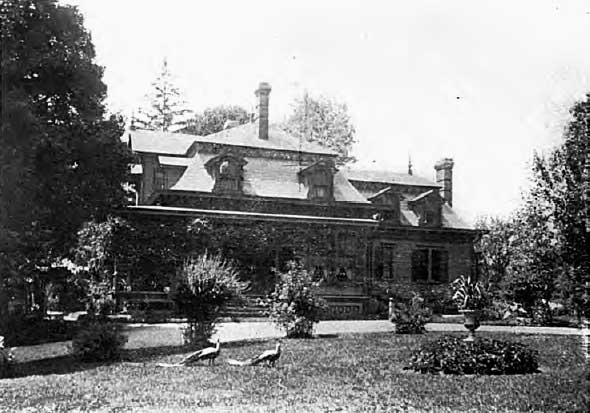
The house of Hillsdale, NJ, town father David P. Patterson, now demolished.

David P. Patterson (c.1840 – July 15, 1879) was president of the Hackensack and New York Extension Railroad (later the New Jersey and New York Railroad) in the late 19th century, and an instrumental figure in the development of Hillsdale, New Jersey, the terminus of the railroad when it reached there in 1870.

In 1860, a decade before the railroad began operating, Patterson purchased "a Demarest farm and 56 acres of land" in the area where it would pass through present-day Hillsdale. An 1876 map of the hamlet (then a part the Township of Washington) lists Patterson as the owner of most plots in its center, though ultimately the development was not as successful as hoped.

In addition to arranging the sale of hundreds of parcels in the vicinity of the train station, Patterson is said to have donated the land for Veteran's Memorial Park, the town's central common (1871), and the original location of the Hillsdale United Methodist Church (1876).

Patterson's lavish home (named "Brook Side Pines" by later owner John Riley) and its surrounding landscaped grounds, located on the north side of Hillsdale Avenue between Pascack Brook and Patterson Street, were the showplace of Hillsdale in their day. The home eventually became the convent for St. John the Baptist Church, and was destroyed in the early 2000s to make way for expansion of the St. John school.
