= Hackensack and New York Railroad =

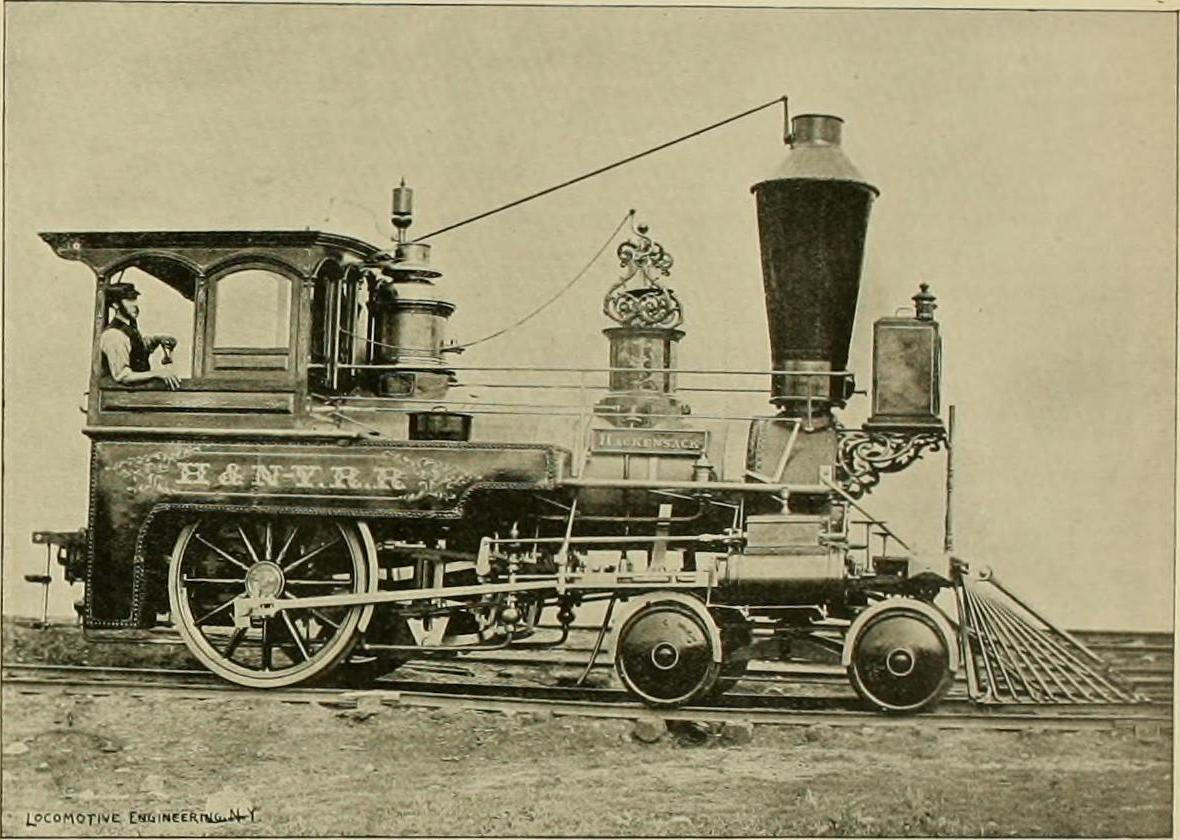
- A map of the Hackensack and New York Railroad train line

Overview
- Headquarters: Hackensack, New Jersey
- Locale: Bergen County, New Jersey, U.S.
- Dates of operation: 1858–1870s
- Successor: New Jersey and New York Railroad

Technical
- Track gauge: 4 ft 8 1/2 in (1,435 mm) standard gauge

The Hackensack and New York Railroad was a New Jersey railroad company which was chartered in 1856. The railway ran from Rutherford, New Jersey to Hackensack, New Jersey and service started in 1858. Construction along a northward extension of the line known as the Hackensack and New York Extension Railroad under the leadership of David P. Patterson started in 1866. Service to Hillsdale opened on March 4, 1870.

The company entered receivership in 1878 and reorganized as the New Jersey and New York Railroad, extended into Rockland County, New York and leased by the Erie Railroad in 1896. The track right of way is now New Jersey Transit's Pascack Valley Line.
