= Hillsdale, New Jersey =

Borough in Bergen County, New Jersey, US

- Borough
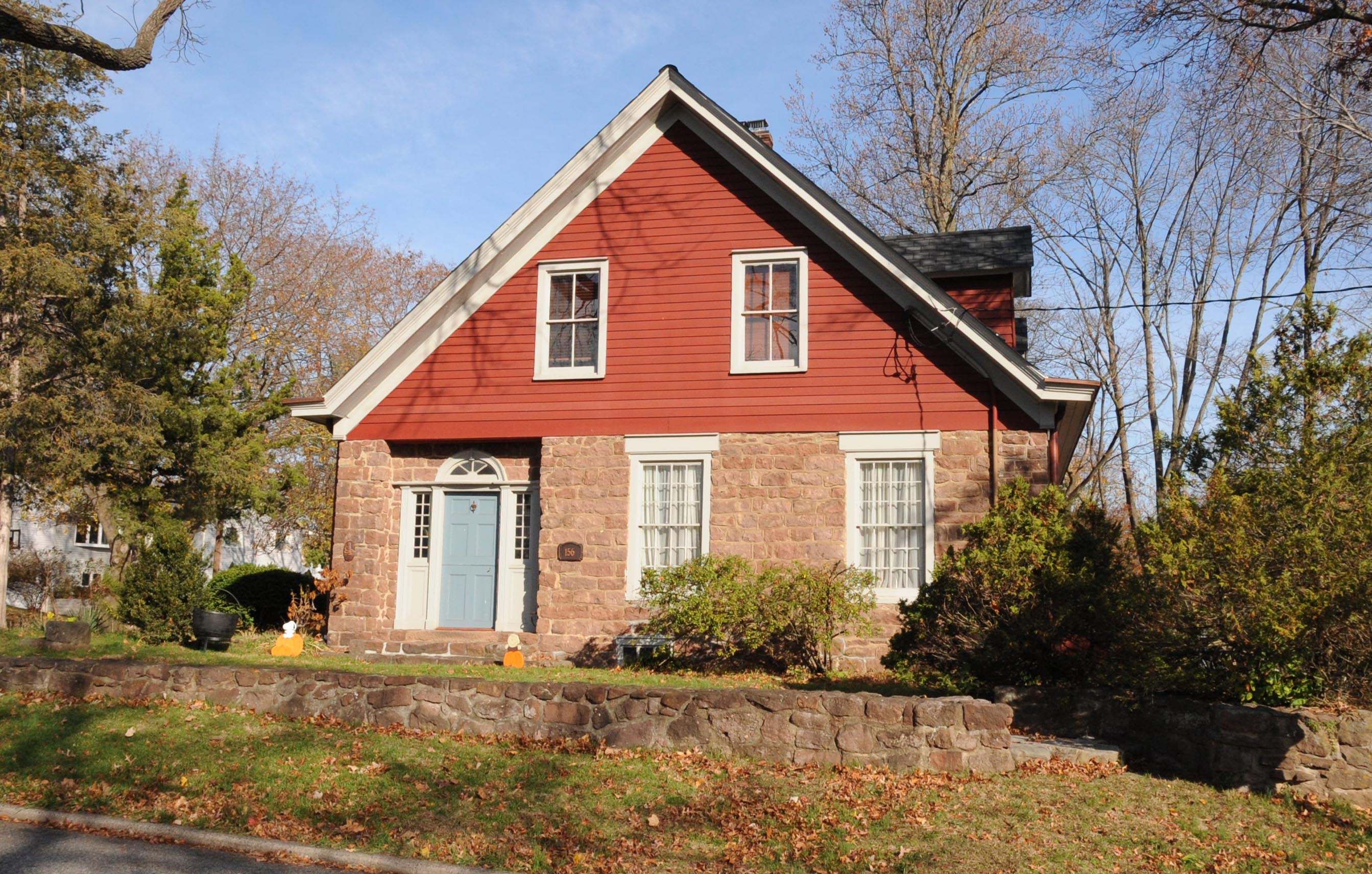
- Garret Durie House

- Seal

- Location of Hillsdale in Bergen County highlighted in red (left). Inset map: Location of Bergen County in New Jersey highlighted in orange (right).

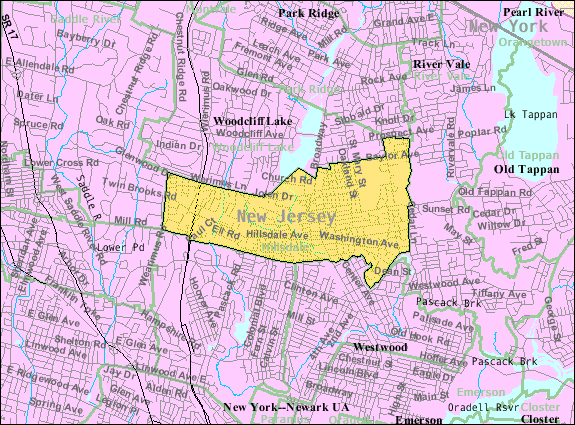
- Census Bureau map of Hillsdale, New Jersey

- Location in Bergen County Location in New Jersey Location in the United States
- Coordinates: 41.007127°N 74.045119°W
- Country: United States
- State: New Jersey
- County: Bergen
- Incorporated: March 25, 1898, as Township; April 24, 1923 as Borough

Government
  - Type: Borough
  - Body: Borough Council
  - Mayor: Michael Sheinfeld (D, term ends December 31, 2027)
  - Administrator: Mike Ghassali
  - Municipal clerk: Denise Kohan

Area
  - Total: 2.94 sq mi (7.61 km^{2})
  - Land: 2.90 sq mi (7.52 km^{2})
  - Water: 0.035 sq mi (0.09 km^{2}) 1.19%
  - Rank: 336th of 565 in state 27th of 70 in county
- Elevation: 62 ft (19 m)

Population (2020)
  - Total: 10,143
  - Estimate (2023): 10,062
  - Rank: 240th of 565 in state 36th of 70 in county
  - Density: 3,495.2/sq mi (1,349.5/km^{2})
  - Rank: 193rd of 565 in state 39th of 70 in county
- Time zone: UTC−05:00 (Eastern (EST))
  - Summer (DST): UTC−04:00 (Eastern (EDT))
- ZIP Code: 07642
- Area code: 201
- FIPS code: 3400331920
- GNIS feature ID: 0885255
- Website: www.hillsdalenj.org

Hillsdale is a borough in the northern portion of Bergen County, in the U.S. state of New Jersey, within the New York City metropolitan area. As of the 2020 United States census, the borough's population was 10,143, a decrease of 76 (−0.7%) from the 2010 census count of 10,219, which in turn reflected an increase of 132 (+1.3%) from the 10,087 counted in the 2000 census.

The populated area today known as Hillsdale took form in the mid-to-late 19th century as land speculators, led by David P. Patterson, developed subdivisions to profit from the coming of the Hackensack and New York Railroad (later New Jersey and New York Railroad). The area was incorporated as Hillsdale Township on March 25, 1898, from portions of Washington Township, which had, in turn, been set off from Harrington Township in 1840. Portions of the township were taken on April 30, 1906, to create the township of River Vale. Hillsdale was reincorporated as a borough by an act of the New Jersey Legislature on March 2, 1923, subject to approval which came in a referendum held on April 24, 1923. The borough's name derives from its location in a "dale among the hills".

== Geography ==
According to the United States Census Bureau, the borough had a total area of 2.94 square miles (7.61 km^{2}), including 2.90 square miles (7.52 km^{2}) of land and 0.04 square miles (0.09 km^{2}) of water (1.19%).

A small portion of Woodcliff Lake Reservoir lies inside the borough, at the southeast end of the reservoir, with Church Road following along the southern end of the spillway.

The borough borders Ho-Ho-Kus, Park Ridge, River Vale, Saddle River, Washington Township, Westwood and Woodcliff Lake.

As of 2026, the borough is a member of Local Leaders for Responsible Planning in order to address the borough's Mount Laurel doctrine-based housing obligations.

== Demographics ==
Historical population
Census	Pop.	Note	%±
1900	891		—
1910	1,072	*	20.3%
1920	1,720		60.4%
1930	2,959		72.0%
1940	3,438		16.2%
1950	4,127		20.0%
1960	8,734		111.6%
1970	11,768		34.7%
1980	10,495		−10.8%
1990	9,750		−7.1%
2000	10,087		3.5%
2010	10,219		1.3%
2020	10,143		−0.7%
2023 (est.)	10,062	▼	−0.8%
Population sources: 1900–1920 1900–1910; 1910–1930 1900–2020; 2000 2010 2020 * = Lost territory in previous decade.

=== Racial and ethnic composition ===
Hillsdale borough, Bergen County, New Jersey – Racial and ethnic composition Note: the US Census treats Hispanic/Latino as an ethnic category. This table excludes Latinos from the racial categories and assigns them to a separate category. Hispanics/Latinos may be of any race.
Race / Ethnicity (NH = Non-Hispanic)	Pop 2000	Pop 2010	Pop 2020	% 2000	% 2010	% 2020
White alone (NH)	8,983	8,590	7,861	89.06%	84.06%	77.50%
Black or African American alone (NH)	86	93	115	0.85%	0.91%	1.13%
Native American or Alaska Native alone (NH)	5	8	3	0.05%	0.08%	0.03%
Asian alone (NH)	511	638	742	5.07%	6.24%	7.32%
Native Hawaiian or Pacific Islander alone (NH)	4	2	1	0.04%	0.02%	0.01%
Other race alone (NH)	9	22	47	0.09%	0.22%	0.46%
Mixed race or Multiracial (NH)	60	72	236	0.59%	0.70%	2.33%
Hispanic or Latino (any race)	429	794	1,138	4.25%	7.77%	11.22%
Total	10,087	10,219	10,143	100.00%	100.00%	100.00%

=== 2020 census ===
As of the 2020 census, Hillsdale had a population of 10,143. The median age was 44.0 years. 22.9% of residents were under the age of 18 and 17.2% of residents were 65 years of age or older. For every 100 females there were 94.5 males, and for every 100 females age 18 and over there were 90.8 males.

100.0% of residents lived in urban areas, while 0.0% lived in rural areas.

There were 3,502 households in Hillsdale, of which 37.0% had children under the age of 18 living in them. Of all households, 68.1% were married-couple households, 9.4% were households with a male householder and no spouse or partner present, and 19.4% were households with a female householder and no spouse or partner present. About 16.2% of all households were made up of individuals and 10.3% had someone living alone who was 65 years of age or older.

There were 3,635 housing units, of which 3.7% were vacant. The homeowner vacancy rate was 1.1% and the rental vacancy rate was 0.7%.

=== 2010 census ===
The 2010 United States census counted 10,219 people, 3,493 households, and 2,843 families in the borough. The population density was 3,464.8 per square mile (1,337.8/km^{2}). There were 3,567 housing units at an average density of 1,209.4 per square mile (467.0/km^{2}). The racial makeup was 89.42% (9,138) White, 1.01% (103) Black or African American, 0.12% (12) Native American, 6.26% (640) Asian, 0.05% (5) Pacific Islander, 2.06% (211) from other races, and 1.08% (110) from two or more races. Hispanic or Latino of any race were 7.77% (794) of the population.

Of the 3,493 households, 40.1% had children under the age of 18; 69.6% were married couples living together; 8.5% had a female householder with no husband present and 18.6% were non-families. Of all households, 16.1% were made up of individuals and 9.6% had someone living alone who was 65 years of age or older. The average household size was 2.92 and the average family size was 3.27. Same-sex couples headed 23 households in 2010, an increase from the 19 counted in 2000.

26.6% of the population were under the age of 18, 6.0% from 18 to 24, 21.6% from 25 to 44, 31.0% from 45 to 64, and 14.8% who were 65 years of age or older. The median age was 42.8 years. For every 100 females, the population had 95.7 males. For every 100 females ages 18 and older there were 92.5 males.

The Census Bureau's 2006–2010 American Community Survey showed that (in 2010 inflation-adjusted dollars) median household income was $116,021 (with a margin of error of +/− $6,848) and the median family income was $132,340 (+/− $8,841). Males had a median income of $91,250 (+/− $6,943) versus $53,190 (+/− $11,522) for females. The per capita income for the borough was $45,549 (+/− $2,679). About 1.4% of families and 3.0% of the population were below the poverty line, including 4.0% of those under age 18 and 2.9% of those age 65 or over.

=== 2000 census ===
As of the 2000 United States census there were 10,087 people, 3,502 households, and 2,850 families residing in the borough. The population density was 3,383.2 inhabitants per square mile (1,306.3/km^{2}). There were 3,547 housing units at an average density of 1,189.7 per square mile (459.3/km^{2}). The racial makeup of the borough was 92.41% White, 0.85% African American, 0.07% Native American, 5.08% Asian, 0.04% Pacific Islander, 0.86% from other races, and 0.69% from two or more races. Hispanic or Latino of any race were 4.25% of the population.

There were 3,502 households, out of which 38.1% had children under the age of 18 living with them, 70.8% were married couples living together, 7.7% had a female householder with no husband present, and 18.6% were non-families. 15.7% of all households were made up of individuals, and 8.8% had someone living alone who was 65 years of age or older. The average household size was 2.87 and the average family size was 3.20.

In the borough the population was spread out, with 26.0% under the age of 18, 5.1% from 18 to 24, 29.0% from 25 to 44, 25.1% from 45 to 64, and 14.8% who were 65 years of age or older. The median age was 40 years. For every 100 females, there were 95.0 males. For every 100 females age 18 and over, there were 90.8 males.

The median income for a household in the borough was $82,904, and the median income for a family was $90,861. Males had a median income of $65,052 versus $43,558 for females. The per capita income for the borough was $34,651. About 2.5% of families and 3.3% of the population were below the poverty line, including 2.9% of those under age 18 and 3.0% of those age 65 or over.

== Parks and recreation ==
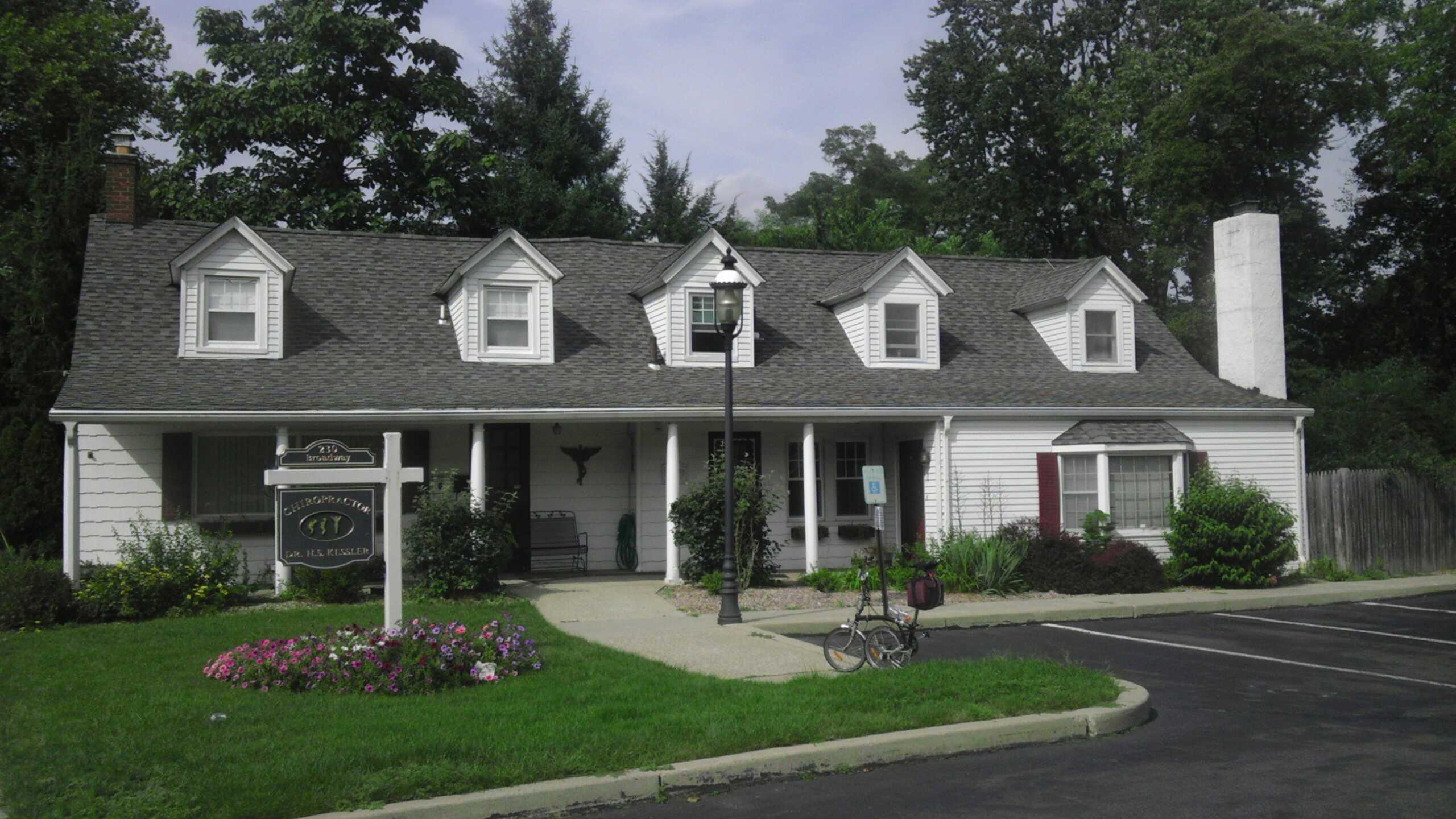
The Blauvelt-Demarest House in Hillsdale is listed on both the U.S. National Register of Historic Places and the New Jersey Register of Historic Places.

- Stonybrook Swim Club is a pool complex located on Cedar Lane that includes an Olympic-size swimming pool, kiddie pool, intermediate pool, water slide, picnic area, basketball court, and playground.
- Beechwood Park, located on Hillsdale Avenue, has an amphitheater, playground, picnic area, and a softball field. In 2014, a group of 70 residents, assisted by a $1,000 grant, worked to rebuild and expand walking trails that run through the park.
- Hillsdale Memorial Park, located across from Beechwood Park has baseball fields and basketball courts.
- Hillsdale has several recreational sports including basketball, baseball, softball, soccer, lacrosse, and football.

== Government ==
=== Local government ===
Hillsdale is governed under the borough form of New Jersey municipal government, which is used in 218 municipalities (of the 564) statewide, making it the most common form of government in New Jersey. The governing body is comprised of a mayor and a borough council, with all positions elected at-large on a partisan basis as part of the November general election. A mayor is elected directly by the voters to a four-year term of office. The borough council includes six members elected to serve three-year terms on a staggered basis, with two seats coming up for election each year in a three-year cycle. The borough form of government used by Hillsdale is a "weak mayor / strong council" government in which council members act as the legislative body with the mayor presiding at meetings and voting only in the event of a tie. The mayor can veto ordinances subject to an override by a two-thirds majority vote of the council. The mayor makes committee and liaison assignments for council members, and most appointments are made by the mayor with the advice and consent of the council.

As of 2023, the mayor of Hillsdale is Democrat Michael Sheinfield, whose term of office ends December 31, 2027. Members of the Hillsdale Borough Council are Council President John Escobar (R, 2024), Anthony DeRosa (R, 2023), Justin P. Fox (R, 2025), Zoltan Horvath (R, 2023), Abby Lundy (R, 2024), Clemente Osso (R, 2026), John Ruocco (R, 2026), and Janetta Trochimiuk (R, 2025).

After Douglas Frank resigned due to health issues, the council selected John Ruocco in September 2017 to replace him as mayor for the seat expiring in December 2019. The council chose Zoltan Horvath from three candidates nominated by the Republican municipal committee to fill Ruocco's vacant council seat expiring December 2017, while Frank Pizzella was selected to serve as council president through the end of the year.

Frank Pizzella was appointed in January 2013 to fill the vacant seat of Michael Giancarlo expiring in December 2013. Giancarlo's resignation in December 2012 was one of five that year, with Anthony DeRosa appointed in January 2012 to fill the seat of Donna Schiavone, Leslie Becker appointed to fill the vacancy of Jonathan DeJoseph when he was named as borough administrator, Frank Pizzella replacing Rod Capawana, and John MacEwen replacing the seat that Leslie Becker had briefly occupied.

=== Federal, state and county representation ===
Hillsdale is located in the 5th Congressional District and is part of New Jersey's 39th state legislative district.

For the 119th United States Congress, New Jersey's 5th congressional district is represented by Josh Gottheimer (D, Wyckoff). New Jersey is represented in the United States Senate by Democrats Cory Booker (Newark, term ends 2027) and Andy Kim (Moorestown, term ends 2031).

For the 2026–2027 session, the 39th legislative district of the New Jersey Legislature is represented in the State Senate by Holly Schepisi (R, River Vale) and in the General Assembly by Robert Auth (R, Old Tappan) and John V. Azzariti (R, Saddle River).

Bergen County is governed by a directly elected County Executive, with legislative functions performed by a Board of County Commissioners comprised of seven members who are elected at-large to three-year terms in partisan elections on a staggered basis, with either two or three seats coming up for election each November; a Chairman and Vice Chairman are selected from among its seven members at a reorganization meeting held every January. As of 2025, the county executive is James J. Tedesco III (D, Paramus), whose four-year term of office ends December 31, 2026.

Bergen County's Commissioners are Chair Mary J. Amoroso (D, Mahwah, 2025), Vice Chair Steven A. Tanelli (D, North Arlington, 2027), Chair Pro Tem Joan Voss (D, Fort Lee, 2026), Rafael Marte (D, Bergenfield, 2026), Germaine M. Ortiz (D, Emerson, 2025), Thomas J. Sullivan Jr. (D, Montvale, 2025) and Tracy Silna Zur (D, Franklin Lakes, 2027).

Bergen County's elected constitutional officials are Clerk John S. Hogan (D, Northvale, 2026), Sheriff Anthony Cureton (D, Englewood, 2027) and Surrogate Michael R. Dressler (D, Cresskill, 2026).

=== Politics ===
As of March 2011, there were a total of 7,092 registered voters in Hillsdale, of which 1,694 (23.9% vs. 31.7% countywide) were registered as Democrats, 2,067 (29.1% vs. 21.1%) were registered as Republicans and 3,323 (46.9% vs. 47.1%) were registered as Unaffiliated. There were 8 voters registered as Libertarians or Greens. Among the borough's 2010 Census population, 69.4% (vs. 57.1% in Bergen County) were registered to vote, including 94.5% of those ages 18 and over (vs. 73.7% countywide).

Gubernatorial election results for Hillsdale
Year	Republican		Democratic		Third party(ies)	
Year	No.	%	No.	%	No.	%
2025	2,426	47.87%	2,622	51.74%	20	0.39%
2021	2,125	51.78%	1,958	47.71%	21	0.51%
2017	1,552	47.45%	1,668	50.99%	51	1.56%
2013	2,262	65.07%	1,183	34.03%	31	0.89%
2009	2,034	52.97%	1,561	40.65%	245	6.38%
2005	1,779	48.22%	1,850	50.15%	60	1.63%

In the 2016 presidential election, Republican Donald Trump received 2,836 votes (48.1% vs. 41.1% countywide), ahead of Democrat Hillary Clinton with 2,803 votes (47.6% vs. 54.2%) and other candidates with 252 votes (4.3% vs. 4.6%), among the 5,935 ballots cast by the borough's 7,768 registered voters, for a turnout of 76.4% (vs. 72.5% in Bergen County). In the 2012 presidential election, Republican Mitt Romney received 2,837 votes (51.2% vs. 43.5% countywide), ahead of Democrat Barack Obama with 2,610 votes (47.1% vs. 54.8%) and other candidates with 48 votes (0.9% vs. 0.9%), among the 5,537 ballots cast by the borough's 7,348 registered voters, for a turnout of 75.4% (vs. 70.4% in Bergen County). In the 2008 presidential election, Republican John McCain received 2,953 votes (50.4% vs. 44.5% countywide), ahead of Democrat Barack Obama with 2,814 votes (48.1% vs. 53.9%) and other candidates with 40 votes (0.7% vs. 0.8%), among the 5,854 ballots cast by the borough's 7,175 registered voters, for a turnout of 81.6% (vs. 76.8% in Bergen County). In the 2004 presidential election, Republican George W. Bush received 2,982 votes (52.7% vs. 47.2% countywide), ahead of Democrat John Kerry with 2,611 votes (46.2% vs. 51.7%) and other candidates with 48 votes (0.8% vs. 0.7%), among the 5,655 ballots cast by the borough's 6,879 registered voters, for a turnout of 82.2% (vs. 76.9% in the whole county).

Presidential elections results
Year	Republican	Democratic
2024	48.2% 3,076	49.1% 3,135
2020	45.5% 3,121	52.8% 3,619
2016	48.1% 2,836	47.6% 2,803
2012	51.2% 2,837	47.1% 2,610
2008	50.4% 2,953	48.1% 2,814
2004	52.7% 2,982	46.2% 2,611

In the 2013 gubernatorial election, Republican Chris Christie received 65.1% of the vote (2,262 cast), ahead of Democrat Barbara Buono with 34.0% (1,183 votes), and other candidates with 0.9% (31 votes), among the 3,536 ballots cast by the borough's 7,185 registered voters (60 ballots were spoiled), for a turnout of 49.2%. In the 2009 gubernatorial election, Republican Chris Christie received 2,034 votes (52.7% vs. 45.8% countywide), ahead of Democrat Jon Corzine with 1,561 votes (40.4% vs. 48.0%), Independent Chris Daggett with 225 votes (5.8% vs. 4.7%) and other candidates with 20 votes (0.5% vs. 0.5%), among the 3,860 ballots cast by the borough's 7,137 registered voters, yielding a 54.1% turnout (vs. 50.0% in the county).

United States Senate election results for Hillsdale1
Year	Republican		Democratic		Third party(ies)	
Year	No.	%	No.	%	No.	%
2024	2,925	48.31%	3,043	50.26%	87	1.44%
2018	2,208	51.34%	1,975	45.92%	118	2.74%
2012	2,464	48.48%	2,536	49.90%	82	1.61%
2006	1,882	51.53%	1,713	46.91%	57	1.56%

United States Senate election results for Hillsdale2
Year	Republican		Democratic		Third party(ies)	
Year	No.	%	No.	%	No.	%
2020	3,117	46.45%	3,513	52.35%	80	1.19%
2014	1,620	48.50%	1,672	50.06%	48	1.44%
2013	1,046	46.37%	1,198	53.10%	12	0.53%
2008	2,648	49.50%	2,642	49.38%	60	1.12%

== Emergency services ==
=== Police ===
The Hillsdale Police Department has provided police services to the Borough of Hillsdale since 1921. As of 2023, there are a total of 22 members of the department: one chief, one captain, two detectives, 18 officers, in addition to three full-time and seven part-time dispatchers. The HPD is a full-time department funded by taxes. The force is responsible for all aspects of policing in the borough, including responding to fire and medical emergency calls. Each patrol car is equipped with a first aid kit, oxygen tank, and an Automated external defibrillator.

Officers of the Hillsdale Police Department are members of Hillsdale PBA Local 207 of the New Jersey State Policemen's Benevolent Association.

=== Fire ===
The Hillsdale Fire Department (HFD) is an all-volunteer fire department, started in 1902. The department consists of one chief, one deputy chief, two Captains, and four lieutenants. The department's headquarters is located at 383 Hillsdale Avenue, and houses two pumpers, Engine 27-1 and Engine 27-2; one tower ladder, 27 Truck, and one rescue unit, 27 Rescue. There is also a Fire chief's vehicle and a vehicle for the Assistant Chief. HFD is part of Bergen County Fire Battalion 7, is responsible for fire suppression and rescue services on the stretch of the Garden State Parkway that passes through the Borough (mile markers 167.7-168.4) and dispatching is done by Bergen County Dispatch 'FireComm'

=== Ambulance ===
The Hillsdale Volunteer Ambulance Service was established on January 5, 1954. The service is run by six officers: president, vice president, captain, lieutenant, secretary, and treasurer. The HVAS is an all-volunteer independent public emergency medical service. As such, they do not bill for services, and their equipment is not directly paid for by the borough. Funding is provided by donations and support from the borough. The service provides basic life support, and is staffed primarily by certified emergency medical technicians. They have one Type III ambulance, Ambulance 36.

The primary jurisdiction of the HVAS is the Borough of Hillsdale, but the service also regularly responds to requests for mutual-aid from the neighboring First Aid Squads of Old Tappan, Emerson, Washington Township, Westwood, River Vale, and Tri-Boro (Park Ridge, Woodcliff Lake, and Montvale).

The HVAS is a member of the New Jersey State First Aid Council, the Pascack Valley Volunteer Ambulance Association, and the Pascack Valley Mutual Aid Group, which includes organizations covering eight neighboring municipalities.

== Education ==
The Hillsdale Public Schools serves students in pre-kindergarten through eighth grade. As of the 2023–24 school year, the district, comprised of three schools, had an enrollment of 1,149 students and 126.3 classroom teachers (on an FTE basis), for a student–teacher ratio of 9.1:1. Schools in the district (with 2023–24 enrollment data from the National Center for Education Statistics) are Ann Blanche Smith School with 304 students in grades K–4, Meadowbrook Elementary School with 333 students in grades PreK–4 and George G. White Middle School with 992 students in grades 5–8.

Public school students in ninth through twelfth grades attend Pascack Valley High School along with students from neighboring River Vale. The school is part of the Pascack Valley Regional High School District, which also serves students from Montvale and Woodcliff Lake at Pascack Hills High School. As of the 2023–24 school year, the high school had an enrollment of 955 students and 93.8 classroom teachers (on an FTE basis), for a student–teacher ratio of 10.2:1.

Students from the borough, and all of Bergen County, are eligible to attend the secondary education programs offered by the Bergen County Technical Schools, which include the Bergen County Academies in Hackensack, and the Bergen Tech campus in Teterboro or Paramus. The district offers programs on a shared-time or full-time basis, with admission based on a selective application process and tuition covered by the student's home school district.

St. John's Academy is a Catholic school serving children in pre-kindergarten through eighth grade and operating under the auspices of the Roman Catholic Archdiocese of Newark. The school began as St. John the Baptist Parish School in 1955, and its current name was adopted in 1997 to reflect its collective sponsorship by St. John the Baptist, Hillsdale; St. Andrew's Church, Westwood; Our Lady Mother of the Church, Woodcliff Lake; St. Gabriel the Archangel, Saddle River; and Our Lady of Good Counsel, Washington Township.

== Transportation ==
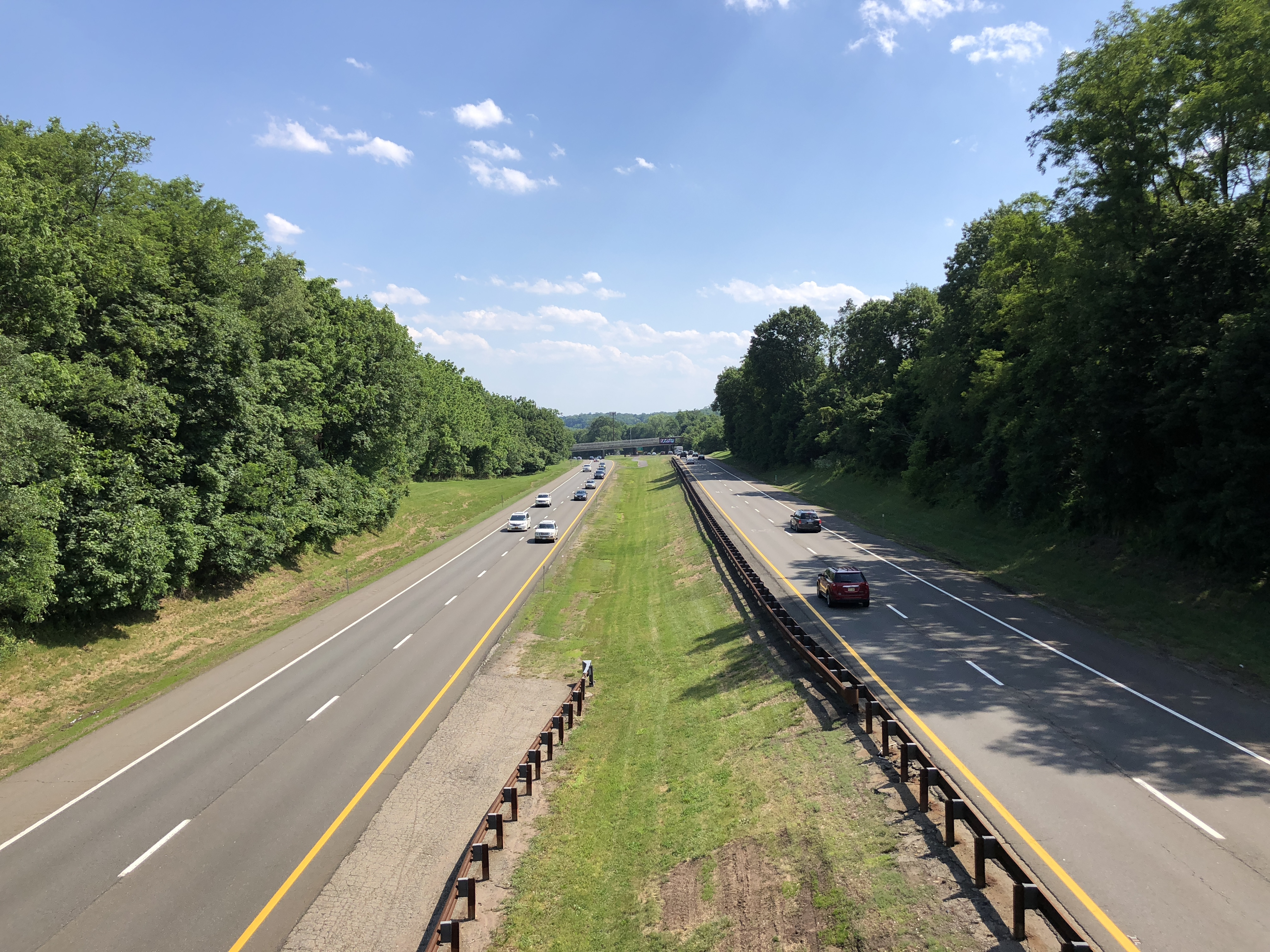
View south along the Garden State Parkway in Hillsdale

=== Roads and highways ===
As of May 2010, the borough had a total of 47.92 miles (77.12 km) of roadways, of which 38.13 miles (61.36 km) were maintained by the municipality, 9.13 miles (14.69 km) by Bergen County and 0.66 miles (1.06 km) by the New Jersey Turnpike Authority.

County Route 503 (Kinderkamack Road) passes through Hillsdale. While the Garden State Parkway passes through Hillsdale, there is no interchange on the parkway within the borough. It is accessible via nearby exit 168. The main east–west road in Hillsdale is Hillsdale Avenue, running nearly the length of the borough. Other main roads in Hillsdale include Pascack Road, Broadway and Wierimus Road.

=== Public transportation ===
Hillsdale is served by NJ Transit at the Hillsdale train station, located at Broadway and Hillsdale Avenue, on the Pascack Valley Line, a single-track line with passing sidings providing service to and from Hoboken Terminal with connections via the Secaucus Junction transfer station to New York Penn Station and to other NJ Transit rail lines. Connections are available at Hoboken Terminal to other New Jersey Transit rail lines, the PATH train, New York Waterways ferry service to the World Financial Center and other destinations, along with Hudson-Bergen Light Rail service.

Rockland Coaches, a unit of Coach USA, provides bus service to the Port Authority Bus Terminal in Midtown Manhattan on their 11 and 47/49 routes from Stony Point, New York.

== Notable people ==
People who were born in, residents of, or otherwise closely associated with Hillsdale include:

- Danny Aiello III (1957–2010), actor, stuntman and son of actor Danny Aiello
- Mary Jane Clark (born 1954), suspense novelist
- Tyler Cowen (born 1962), economist and author, who is an economics professor at George Mason University
- Livvy Dunne (born 2002), artistic gymnast who was a member of the USA national gymnastics team in 2017
- Reuben L. Haskell (1878–1971), U.S. Representative from New York's 10th congressional district from 1915 to 1919
- Buddy Hassett (1911–1997), professional baseball player who played first base in Major League Baseball from 1936 to 1942
- Marion West Higgins (1915–1999), first female Speaker of the New Jersey General Assembly
- Frank Ackerman Hill (1919–2012), military veteran and World War II fighter ace
- Jeff Hostetler (born 1961), quarterback for the New York Giants' victory in Super Bowl XXV
- Charles Kaufman (1928–2016), music educator who taught at the Mannes School of Music from 1975 to 2002
- Johnny Kucks (1933–2013), pitcher who played for the New York Yankees and won the final game of the 1956 World Series
- Eddie Lopat (1918–1992), pitcher for the New York Yankees
- Tanner McEvoy (born 1993), wide receiver for the Seattle Seahawks
- Kathleen Noone (born 1945), soap opera/television actress
- David P. Patterson (c. 1840–1879), president of the Hackensack and New York Railroad and early developer of Hillsdale
- Jeff Phillips (born 1968), fitness trainer and former actor best known for his work in Guiding Light, As the World Turns and the 1996 film Independence Day
- Vic Raschi (1919–1988), pitcher for the New York Yankees
- David Remnick (born 1958), editor for The New Yorker
- Darren Rizzi (born 1970), interim head coach of the New Orleans Saints
- Bob Schmetterer (born 1943), advertising executive
- Celita Schutz (born 1968), judoka who competed on the women's team in the Summer Olympics in 1996, 2000 and 2004
- Bill Skowron (1930–2012), first baseman for the New York Yankees
- Benjamin Sommer (born 1964), Professor of Bible at The Jewish Theological Seminary of America and a Senior Fellow at the Shalom Hartman Institute
- Jenn Tran (born 1997), realty television personality who starred in Season 21 of The Bachelorette
- Mike Vaccaro, lead sports columnist for the New York Post since November 2002
- Jesse Van Saun (born 1976), retired soccer player who played professionally in Major League Soccer and USISL
- Teddy Wilson (1912–1986), jazz pianist
- Jerry Yellin (1924–2017), former United States Army Air Forces fighter pilot, who flew the final combat mission of World War II

== Sources ==
- Municipal Incorporations of the State of New Jersey (according to Counties) prepared by the Division of Local Government, Department of the Treasury (New Jersey); December 1, 1958.
- Clayton, W. Woodford; and Nelson, William. History of Bergen and Passaic Counties, New Jersey, with Biographical Sketches of Many of its Pioneers and Prominent Men. Philadelphia: Everts and Peck, 1882.
- Harvey, Cornelius Burnham (ed.), Genealogical History of Hudson and Bergen Counties, New Jersey. New York: New Jersey Genealogical Publishing Co., 1900.
- Van Valen, James M. History of Bergen County, New Jersey. New York: New Jersey Publishing and Engraving Co., 1900.
- Westervelt, Frances A. (Frances Augusta), 1858–1942, History of Bergen County, New Jersey, 1630–1923, Lewis Historical Publishing Company, 1923.
