= Tomas J. Padilla =

Tomas J. Padilla is an American Democratic Party politician, who has served on the Bergen County Board of Chosen Freeholders since 2002, when he was elected by the Bergen County Democratic Committee to fill the vacated seat of Fort Lee Mayor Jack Alter. On January 2, 2007, Padilla was elected to serve as Freeholder Chairman, becoming the first Hispanic to serve in that role.

In 2004, he became the second Hispanic to be elected to the Board, and in January 2005 he was sworn in. During his term as Freeholder he will serve on the following committees: Education, Labor, Law and Public Safety, Parks and Public Works, Planning Board, Bergen Community College, Vocational Schools, New Jersey Association of Counties, and in the committee of Planning and Economic Development where he will be the chairman.

He holds a bachelor's degree and a Certificate in Public Service Administration from Fairleigh Dickinson University. He has also completed the New Jersey Certified Public Management Program and has received a Certificate in Supervisory Management from the New Jersey Department of Personnel.

He is a graduate of the Bergen County Police Academy and is employed by the City of Hackensack as a captain in the Police Department. He is the commander of the Bureau of Criminal Identification, where among his duties he oversees the departmental Local Area Computer Network.

Padilla has been active in the Democratic Party. He grew up in Hackensack, where he first became a municipal committee member in 1989. He went on to serve as vice-chair of the municipal committee and also as a member of the District 37 executive board. He served on the Transition Teams of Governor of New Jersey James McGreevey and Bergen County Executive, Dennis McNerney.

During his time as a Freeholder he sponsored important public safety initiatives such as: establishing a Countywide Emergency Alert Notification System; providing 1,650 personal protection suits for First Responders in all municipalities; and, acquiring communication equipment for Emergency Management Coordinators.

A resident of Upper Saddle River, Padilla was appointed in August 2015 as the Borough Administrator of Woodcliff Lake.

He and his wife Christine live with their three children.
