= Woodcliff Lake, New Jersey =

Borough in Bergen County, New Jersey, US

- Borough
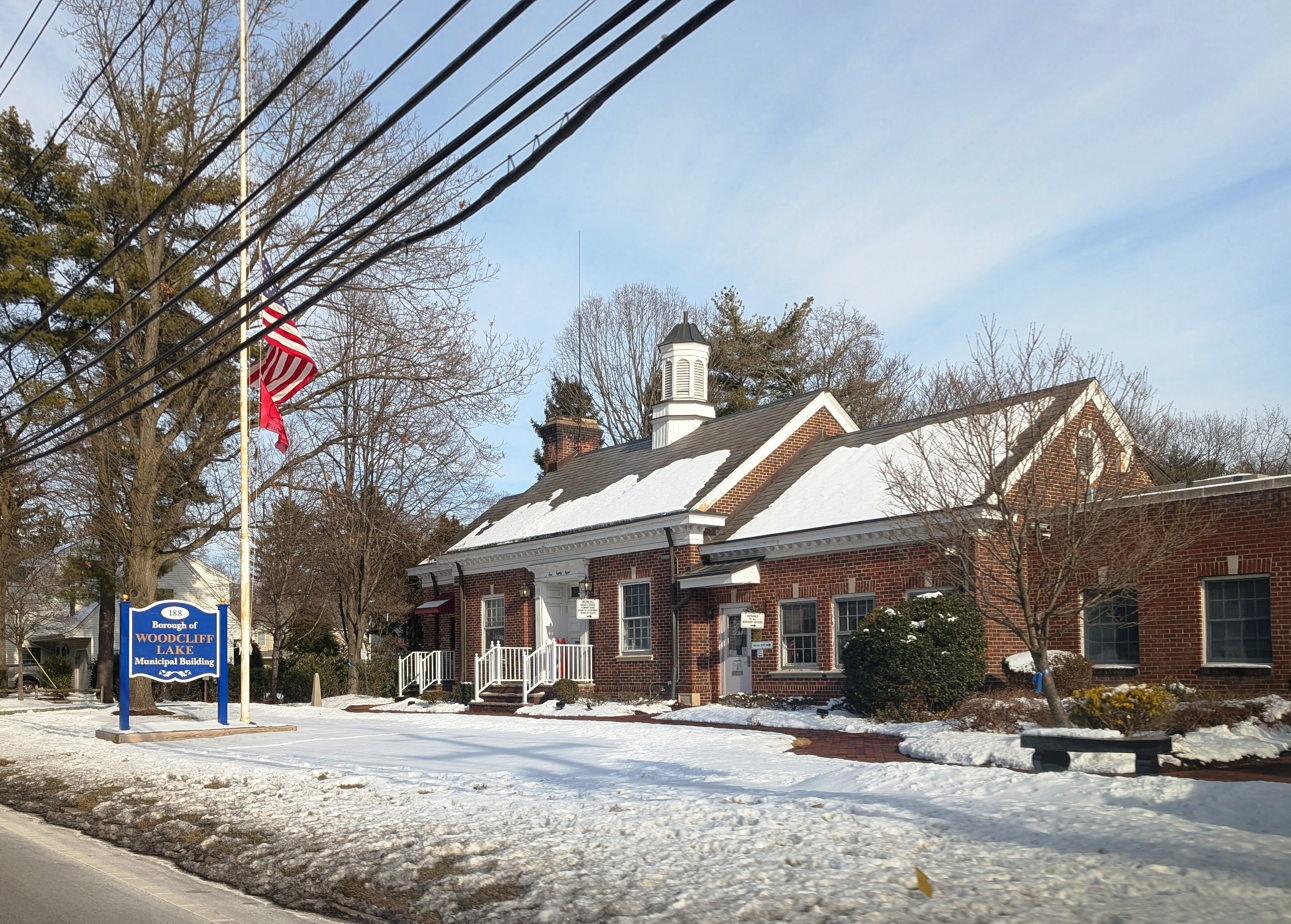
- Woodcliff Lake Municipal Building

- Wordmark
- Interactive map of Woodcliff Lake, New Jersey
- Location in Bergen County Location in New Jersey Location in the United States
- Coordinates: 41.025977°N 74.061061°W
- Country: United States
- State: New Jersey
- County: Bergen
- Incorporated: August 31, 1894, as Woodcliff
- Renamed: March 1, 1910, to Woodcliff Lake

Government
  - Type: Borough
  - Body: Borough Council
  - Mayor: Carlos Rendo (R, term ends December 31, 2027)
  - Administrator: Tomas J. Padilla
  - Municipal clerk: Debbie Dakin

Area
  - Total: 3.55 sq mi (9.19 km^{2})
  - Land: 3.37 sq mi (8.74 km^{2})
  - Water: 0.17 sq mi (0.45 km^{2}) 4.85%
  - Rank: 312th of 565 in state 22nd of 70 in county
- Elevation: 230 ft (70 m)

Population (2020)
  - Total: 6,128
  - Estimate (2024): 6,234
  - Rank: 344th of 565 in state 55th of 70 in county
  - Density: 1,815.2/sq mi (700.9/km^{2})
  - Rank: 307th of 565 in state 58th of 70 in county
- Time zone: UTC−05:00 (Eastern (EST))
  - Summer (DST): UTC−04:00 (Eastern (EDT))
- ZIP Code: 07677
- Area code: 201
- FIPS code: 3400382300
- GNIS feature ID: 0885449
- Website: www.wclnj.com

Woodcliff Lake is a borough in Bergen County, in the U.S. state of New Jersey. As of the 2020 United States census, the borough's population was 6,128, an increase of 398 (+6.9%) from the 2010 census count of 5,730, which in turn reflected a decline of 15 (−0.3%) from the 5,745 counted in the 2000 census. Most of the borough mandates a minimum lot size of 22,500 square feet (2,090 m^{2}) for single-family homes, with portions on the borough's east zoned for 15,000 square feet (1,400 m^{2}) and portions of the borough's northwest and southwest zoned for 30,000 square feet (2,800 m^{2}) lots.

Woodcliff Lake is also the name of the reservoir that lies predominantly within the borough, with a small portion at the southeastern edge located in neighboring Hillsdale.

== History ==
The borough was originally incorporated as the Borough of Woodcliff, on August 31, 1894, from parts of Orvil Township and Washington Township, based on the results of a referendum held three days earlier. The borough was formed during the "Boroughitis" phenomenon then sweeping through Bergen County, in which 26 boroughs were formed in the county in 1894 alone. The borough derives its name from the characteristics of its geography.

On March 1, 1910, after the creation of the reservoir, the name of the borough was changed to Woodcliff Lake, to match the name of the post office. Prior to the creation of ZIP Codes as a way to uniquely identify addresses, United States Postal Service policy was that two post offices in a state could not have the same name, and there was already a "Woodcliff" in Hudson County. On January 1, 1956, and again on July 1, 1958, Woodcliff Lake exchanged sections of land with Park Ridge. On October 13, 1960, portions were exchanged with Hillsdale.

Woodcliff Lake has many historic houses and buildings, some dating from the 18th century. Many old buildings are also present, but are likely to have been modified through the years. The borough has seen intense development over the past 50 years, as virtually all areas available for construction have been developed.

== Geography ==
According to the United States Census Bureau, the borough had a total area of 3.55 square miles (9.19 km^{2}), including 3.38 square miles (8.74 km^{2}) of land and 0.17 square miles (0.45 km^{2}) of water (4.85%).

The borough is bordered by the Bergen County municipalities of Hillsdale, Montvale, Park Ridge, River Vale, Saddle River, and small portions of Upper Saddle River. Woodcliff Lake is located approximately 20 miles (32 km) northwest of Manhattan.

== Demographics ==
Historical population
Census	Pop.	Note	%±
1900	329		—
1910	470		42.9%
1920	587		24.9%
1930	871		48.4%
1940	1,037		19.1%
1950	1,420		36.9%
1960	2,742		93.1%
1970	5,506		100.8%
1980	5,644		2.5%
1990	5,303		−6.0%
2000	5,745		8.3%
2010	5,730		−0.3%
2020	6,128		6.9%
2024 (est.)	6,234	▲	1.7%
Population sources: 1900–1920 1900–1910; 1910–1930 1900–2020; 2000 2010 2020

=== Racial and ethnic composition ===
Woodcliff Lake borough, New Jersey – Racial and ethnic composition Note: the US Census treats Hispanic/Latino as an ethnic category. This table excludes Latinos from the racial categories and assigns them to a separate category. Hispanics/Latinos may be of any race.
Race / Ethnicity (NH = Non-Hispanic)	Pop 2000	Pop 2010	Pop 2020	% 2000	% 2010	% 2020
White alone (NH)	5,274	4,946	4,955	91.80%	86.32%	80.86%
Black or African American alone (NH)	49	47	46	0.85%	0.82%	0.75%
Native American or Alaska Native alone (NH)	1	0	2	0.02%	0.00%	0.03%
Asian alone (NH)	257	371	536	4.47%	6.47%	8.75%
Native Hawaiian or Pacific Islander alone (NH)	0	0	1	0.00%	0.00%	0.02%
Other race alone (NH)	0	8	28	0.00%	0.14%	0.46%
Mixed race or Multiracial (NH)	30	48	153	0.52%	0.84%	2.50%
Hispanic or Latino (any race)	134	310	407	2.33%	5.41%	6.64%
Total	5,745	5,730	6,128	100.00%	100.00%	100.00%

=== 2020 census ===
As of the 2020 census, Woodcliff Lake had a population of 6,128. The median age was 45.5 years. 23.4% of residents were under the age of 18 and 20.0% were 65 years of age or older. For every 100 females, there were 93.2 males, and for every 100 females age 18 and over, there were 91.5 males age 18 and over.

100.0% of residents lived in urban areas, while 0.0% lived in rural areas.

There were 2,114 households, of which 36.4% had children under the age of 18 living in them. Of all households, 70.0% were married-couple households, 8.6% had a male householder and no spouse or partner present, and 18.5% had a female householder and no spouse or partner present. About 17.4% of all households were made up of individuals, and 13.6% had someone living alone who was 65 years of age or older.

There were 2,235 housing units, of which 5.4% were vacant. The homeowner vacancy rate was 0.6% and the rental vacancy rate was 19.3%.

=== 2010 census ===
The 2010 United States census counted 5,730 people, 1,916 households, and 1,600 families in the borough. The population density was 1,682.7 per square mile (649.7/km^{2}). There were 1,980 housing units at an average density of 581.5 per square mile (224.5/km^{2}). The racial makeup was 90.30% (5,174) White, 0.82% (47) Black or African American, 0.00% (0) Native American, 6.47% (371) Asian, 0.00% (0) Pacific Islander, 1.20% (69) from other races, and 1.20% (69) from two or more races. Hispanic or Latino of any race were 5.41% (310) of the population.

Of the 1,916 households, 42.3% had children under the age of 18; 75.4% were married couples living together; 6.5% had a female householder with no husband present and 16.5% were non-families. Of all households, 15.0% were made up of individuals and 10.7% had someone living alone who was 65 years of age or older. The average household size was 2.94 and the average family size was 3.28.

27.9% of the population were under the age of 18, 5.3% from 18 to 24, 17.1% from 25 to 44, 33.3% from 45 to 64, and 16.4% who were 65 years of age or older. The median age was 44.8 years. For every 100 females, the population had 91.4 males. For every 100 females ages 18 and older there were 89.0 males.

The Census Bureau's 2006–2010 American Community Survey showed that (in 2010 inflation-adjusted dollars) median household income was $150,404 (with a margin of error of +/− $25,298) and the median family income was $172,019 (+/− $32,763). Males had a median income of $105,045 (+/− $11,151) versus $65,119 (+/− $22,660) for females. The per capita income for the borough was $62,925 (+/− $7,887). About 1.1% of families and 1.8% of the population were below the poverty line, including 1.5% of those under age 18 and 1.9% of those age 65 or over.

Same-sex couples headed five households in 2010, an increase from the one household counted in 2000.

=== 2000 census ===
As of the 2000 United States census, there were 5,745 people, 1,824 households, and 1,605 families residing in the borough. The population density was 1,725.3 inhabitants per square mile (666.1/km^{2}). There were 1,842 housing units at an average density of 553.2 per square mile (213.6/km^{2}). The racial makeup of the borough was 93.84% White, 0.87% African American, 0.03% Native American, 4.47% Asian, 0.19% from other races, and 0.59% from two or more races. 2.33% of the population were Hispanic or Latino of any race.

There were 1,824 households, out of which 47.4% had children under the age of 18 living with them, 80.2% were married couples living together, 6.6% had a female householder with no husband present, and 12.0% were non-families. 10.6% of all households were made up of individuals, and 6.1% had someone living alone who was 65 years of age or older. The average household size was 3.08 and the average family size was 3.31.

In the borough the population was spread out, with 29.9% under the age of 18, 4.5% from 18 to 24, 24.4% from 25 to 44, 27.8% from 45 to 64, and 13.4% who were 65 years of age or older. The median age was 41 years. For every 100 females, there were 92.3 males. For every 100 females age 18 and over, there were 88.1 males.

The median income for a household in the borough was $123,022, and the median income for a family was $133,925. Males had a median income of $90,000 versus $45,150 for females. The per capita income for the borough was $53,461. 1.5% of the population and 0.9% of families were below the poverty line. Out of the total population, 1.4% of those under the age of 18 and 2.3% of those 65 and older were living below the poverty line.

== Economy ==
The borough was the world headquarters of Ingersoll Rand until the company moved in 2004, after which its property was taken over by the North American headquarters of BMW. The borough is also the corporate headquarters of Perillo Tours, which consists of an elaborate Italian revival where Richard Nixon had an office after his presidency.

Tice's Corner Marketplace is a strip mall located on the site of the original Tice's Farms that features more than 20 stores. Due to Bergen County's blue laws, all the retail stores are closed on Sundays, but two of its restaurants are open.

== Arts and culture ==
The Tri-Boro area consisting of Woodcliff Lake, Park Ridge, and Montvale all participate in an annual Memorial Day Parade.

The musical group The Front Bottoms was formed by Woodcliff Lake residents Brian Sella (lead vocalist) and Mathew Uychich (drums).

== Parks and recreation ==
Wood Dale County Park is a Bergen County park covering 118 acres (48 ha) located on Prospect Avenue. It has a playground, a dog park, walking path, tennis courts, athletic fields, picnic areas and a lake for fishing and model boating.

Old Mill Pool is a public pool complex located on Werimus Road. It has a pool, water slide, playground and a picnic area.

Woodcliff Park, covering 2.1 acres (0.84 ha), is located on Woodcliff Avenue and Werimus Road. It is used as a public gathering space, walking track, and events space. It is located on the former property of Galaxy Gardens, a nursery and service station, which the borough purchased for $1.65 million. The property required years of environmental remediation, a $1.5 million legal settlement related to the acquisition, and $2.75 million in construction. Due to COVID-19 pandemic delays, construction, and environmental cleanup, the project took nearly a decade.

== Government ==
=== Politics ===
Gubernatorial election results for Woodcliff Lake
Year	Republican		Democratic		Third party(ies)	
Year	No.	%	No.	%	No.	%
2025	1,551	51.19%	1,466	48.38%	13	0.43%
2021	1,259	49.08%	1,292	50.37%	14	0.55%
2017	1,006	49.70%	993	49.06%	25	1.24%
2013	1,603	73.06%	567	25.84%	24	1.09%
2009	1,362	48.66%	1,257	44.91%	180	6.43%
2005	959	44.36%	1,166	53.93%	37	1.71%

As of March 2011, there were a total of 4,209 registered voters in Woodcliff Lake, of which 1,119 (26.6% vs. 31.7% countywide) were registered as Democrats, 1,024 (24.3% vs. 21.1%) were registered as Republicans and 2,065 (49.1% vs. 47.1%) were registered as Unaffiliated. There was one voter registered to other parties. Among the borough's 2010 Census population, 73.5% (vs. 57.1% in Bergen County) were registered to vote, including 101.9% of those ages 18 and over (vs. 73.7% countywide; meaning that there were more registered voters as of the date accessed than those of legal voting age, which can happen when registered voters move out of the borough but aren't removed from the voter rolls).

In the 2020 presidential election, Democrat Joe Biden received 2,323 votes (57.7% vs 57.44% countywide), ahead of Republican Donald Trump with 1,626 votes (40.45% vs 41.06%). In the 2016 presidential election, Democrat Hillary Clinton received 1,804 votes (52.5% vs. 54.2% countywide), ahead of Republican Donald Trump with 1,489 votes (43.3% vs. 41.1%) and other candidates with 142 votes (4.1% vs. 4.6%), among the 3,503 ballots cast by the borough's 4,741 registered voters, for a turnout of 73.9% (vs. 72.5% in Bergen County). In the 2012 presidential election, Republican Mitt Romney received 1,792 votes (56.1% vs. 43.5% countywide), ahead of Democrat Barack Obama with 1,374 votes (43.0% vs. 54.8%) and other candidates with 20 votes (0.6% vs. 0.9%), among the 3,197 ballots cast by the borough's 4,475 registered voters, for a turnout of 71.4% (vs. 70.4% in Bergen County). In the 2008 presidential election, Democrat Barack Obama received 1,696 votes (49.9% vs. 53.9% countywide), ahead of Republican John McCain with 1,646 votes (48.5% vs. 44.5%) and other candidates with 23 votes (0.7% vs. 0.8%), among the 3,396 ballots cast by the borough's 4,305 registered voters, for a turnout of 78.9% (vs. 76.8% in Bergen County). In the 2004 presidential election, Republican George W. Bush received 1,656 votes (49.7% vs. 47.2% countywide), ahead of Democrat John Kerry with 1,638 votes (49.2% vs. 51.7%) and other candidates with 24 votes (0.7% vs. 0.7%), among the 3,329 ballots cast by the borough's 4,108 registered voters, for a turnout of 81.0% (vs. 76.9% in the whole county).

United States presidential election results for Woodcliff Lake 2024 2020 2016 2012 2008 2004
Year	Republican		Democratic		Third party(ies)	
Year	No.	%	No.	%	No.	%
2024	1,769	47.01%	1,942	51.61%	52	1.38%
2020	1,626	40.70%	2,323	58.15%	46	1.15%
2016	1,489	43.35%	1,804	52.52%	142	4.13%
2012	1,792	56.25%	1,374	43.13%	20	0.63%
2008	1,646	48.92%	1,696	50.40%	23	0.68%
2004	1,656	49.91%	1,638	49.37%	24	0.72%

In the 2013 gubernatorial election, Republican Chris Christie received 73.1% of the vote (1,603 cast), ahead of Democrat Barbara Buono with 25.8% (567 votes), and other candidates with 1.1% (24 votes), among the 2,258 ballots cast by the borough's 4,333 registered voters (64 ballots were spoiled), for a turnout of 52.1%. In the 2009 gubernatorial election, Republican Chris Christie received 1,362 votes (48.1% vs. 45.8% countywide), ahead of Democrat Jon Corzine with 1,257 votes (44.4% vs. 48.0%), Independent Chris Daggett with 160 votes (5.7% vs. 4.7%) and other candidates with 20 votes (0.7% vs. 0.5%), among the 2,831 ballots cast by the borough's 4,902 registered voters, yielding a 57.8% turnout (vs. 50.0% in the county).

United States Senate election results for Woodcliff Lake1
Year	Republican		Democratic		Third party(ies)	
Year	No.	%	No.	%	No.	%
2024	1,738	47.91%	1,832	50.50%	58	1.60%
2018	1,680	48.97%	1,648	48.03%	103	3.00%
2012	1,527	51.78%	1,387	47.03%	35	1.19%
2006	1,164	49.09%	1,188	50.11%	19	0.80%

United States Senate election results for Woodcliff Lake2
Year	Republican		Democratic		Third party(ies)	
Year	No.	%	No.	%	No.	%
2020	1,716	43.26%	2,208	55.66%	43	1.08%
2014	982	48.09%	1,038	50.83%	22	1.08%
2013	588	46.01%	683	53.44%	7	0.55%
2008	1,455	46.06%	1,671	52.90%	33	1.04%

=== Local government ===
Woodcliff Lake is governed under the borough form of New Jersey municipal government, which is used in 218 municipalities (of the 564) statewide, making it the most common form of government in New Jersey. The governing body is comprised of a mayor and a borough council, with all positions elected at-large on a partisan basis as part of the November general election. A mayor is elected directly by the voters to a four-year term of office. The borough council includes six members elected to serve three-year terms on a staggered basis, with two seats coming up for election each year in a three-year cycle. The borough form of government used by Woodcliff Lake is a "weak mayor / strong council" government in which council members act as the legislative body with the mayor presiding at meetings and voting only in the event of a tie. The mayor can veto ordinances subject to an override by a two-thirds majority vote of the council. The mayor makes committee and liaison assignments for council members, and most appointments are made by the mayor with the advice and consent of the council.

As of 2026, the mayor of Woodcliff Lake is Republican Carlos Rendo, whose term of office ends December 31, 2027. Members of the Borough Council are Council President Joshua Stern (R, 2026), Christopher Bonanno (R, 2027), Julie Brodsky (R, 2026), Jennifer Margolis (D, 2027), Nicole Marsh (D, 2028) and Benjamin Pollack (D, 2028).

=== Federal, state and county representation ===
Woodcliff Lake is located in the 5th Congressional District and is part of New Jersey's 39th state legislative district.

For the 119th United States Congress, New Jersey's 5th congressional district is represented by Josh Gottheimer (D, Wyckoff).New Jersey is represented in the United States Senate by Democrats Cory Booker (Newark, term ends 2027) and Andy Kim (Moorestown, term ends 2031). For the 2026–2027 session, the 39th legislative district of the New Jersey Legislature is represented in the State Senate by Holly Schepisi (R, River Vale) and in the General Assembly by Robert Auth (R, Old Tappan) and John V. Azzariti (R, Saddle River). Bergen County is governed by a directly elected County Executive, with legislative functions performed by a Board of County Commissioners comprised of seven members who are elected at-large to three-year terms in partisan elections on a staggered basis, with either two or three seats coming up for election each November; a Chairman and Vice Chairman are selected from among its seven members at a reorganization meeting held every January. As of 2025, the county executive is James J. Tedesco III (D, Paramus), whose four-year term of office ends December 31, 2026.

Bergen County's Commissioners are Chair Mary J. Amoroso (D, Mahwah, 2025), Vice Chair Steven A. Tanelli (D, North Arlington, 2027), Chair Pro Tem Joan Voss (D, Fort Lee, 2026), Rafael Marte (D, Bergenfield, 2026), Germaine M. Ortiz (D, Emerson, 2025), Thomas J. Sullivan Jr. (D, Montvale, 2025) and Tracy Silna Zur (D, Franklin Lakes, 2027).

Bergen County's elected constitutional officials are Clerk John S. Hogan (D, Northvale, 2026), Sheriff Anthony Cureton (D, Englewood, 2027) and Surrogate Michael R. Dressler (D, Cresskill, 2026).

== Emergency services ==
=== Fire ===
Woodcliff Lake is served by a volunteer fire department that was established in 1932 after residents became dissatisfied with fire protection paid for through Park Ridge. The WLFD consists of a chief, a deputy chief, two captains and three lieutenants in addition to the 30+ members. Woodcliff Lake Fire Department operates Squad 7, Squad 72, Truck 75 'The Triboro Truck', Rescue 76, Marine 7 and Marine 7A out of the fire house on Pascack Road. The chiefs are assigned cars numbered after their radio designations Chief 7 and Deputy 7. WLFD is part of Bergen County Fire Battalion 8, is responsible for fire suppression and rescue services on the stretch of the Garden State Parkway that passes through the Borough (mile markers 168.4-170.6) and dispatching is contracted to Ridgewood, New Jersey based Northwest Bergen Central Dispatch (NWBCD).

=== Ambulance ===
Together with Park Ridge and Montvale, Woodcliff Lake is one of the three municipalities that is part of the Tri-Boro Volunteer Ambulance Corps, founded in 1938 and provides EMS service to these three communities. Tri-Boro is a non-profit and full volunteer group which provides free emergency service to those in the community who need it at any time. The headquarters is located in Park Ridge near Mill Pond.

=== Police ===
Woodcliff Lake's police department, located next to borough hall and the fire department, was founded in 1954.

== Education ==
The Woodcliff Lake Public Schools serve students in pre-kindergarten through eighth grade. As of the 2023–24 school year, the district, comprised of two schools, had an enrollment of 780 students and 73.0 classroom teachers (on an FTE basis), for a student–teacher ratio of 10.7:1. The schools in the district (with 2023–24 enrollment data from the National Center for Education Statistics) are Dorchester Elementary School with 508 students in grades Pre-K through 5 and Woodcliff Middle School which had 265 students in grades 6–8.

For ninth through twelfth grades, Woodcliff Lake public school students attend Pascack Hills High School, along with those from Montvale. The school is part of the Pascack Valley Regional High School District, which serves students from Hillsdale and River Vale at Pascack Valley High School. As of the 2023–24 school year, the high school had an enrollment of 955 students and 93.8 classroom teachers (on an FTE basis), for a student–teacher ratio of 10.2:1. The mayor and council of Woodcliff Lake have passed resolutions supporting the withdrawal of the borough from the Pascack Valley Regional High School District, noting that the community contributes 28% of the district's spending, while accounting for 19% of the students attending the district's schools. Both Montvale and Woodcliff Lake, with substantial commercial property tax ratables, have a cost per student substantially higher than that paid by the other two communities, with Woodcliff Lake's cost of $28,521 nearly double the $14,840 paid by Hillsdale (on a per student basis).

Public school students from the borough, and all of Bergen County, are eligible to attend the secondary education programs offered by the Bergen County Technical Schools, which include the Bergen County Academies in Hackensack, and the Bergen Tech campus in Teterboro or Paramus. The district offers programs on a shared-time or full-time basis, with admission based on a selective application process and tuition covered by the student's home school district.

== Transportation ==
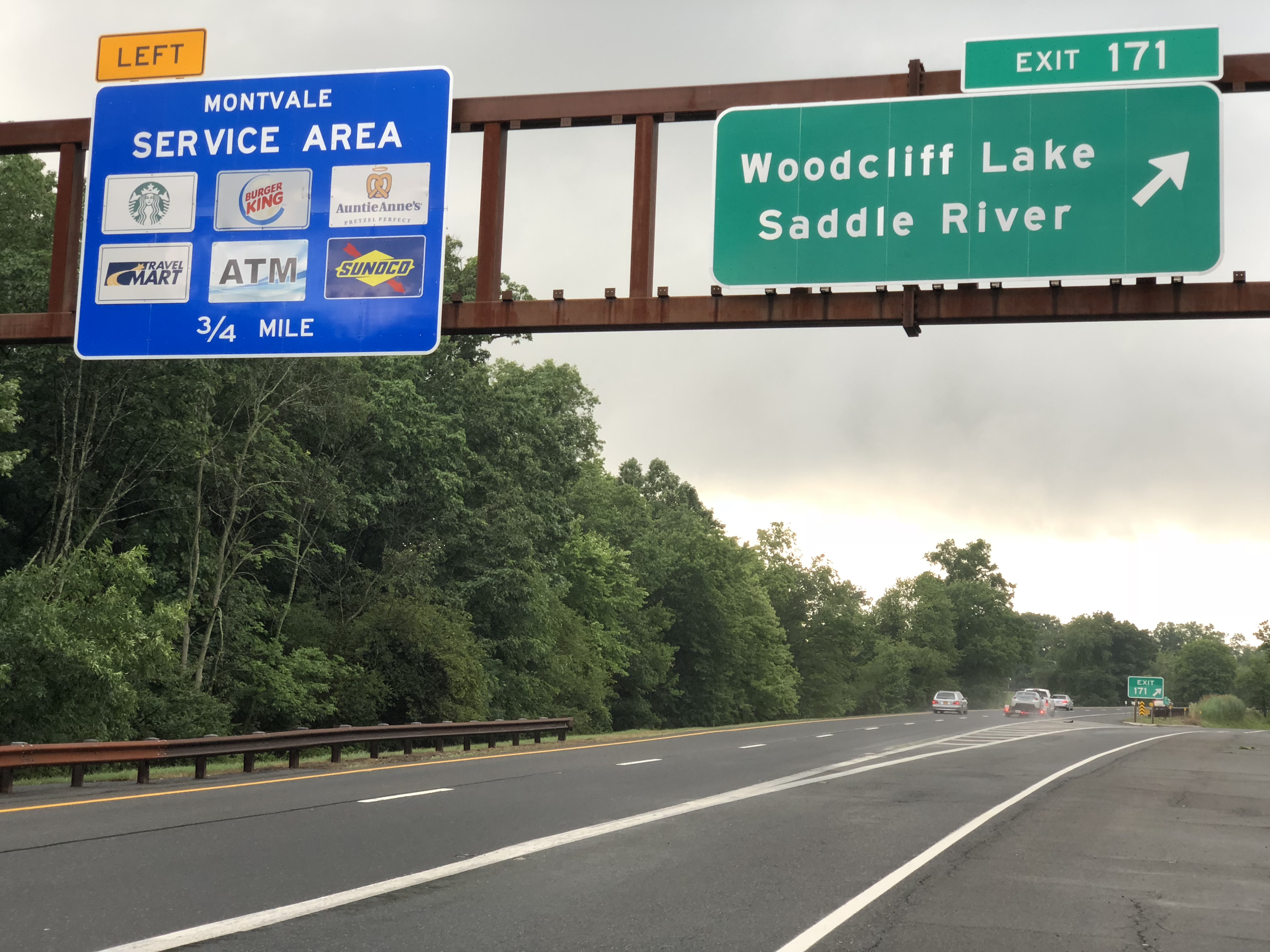
Garden State Parkway northbound at exit 171 in Woodcliff Lake

=== Roads and highways ===
As of May 2010, the borough had a total of 45.94 miles (73.93 km) of roadways, of which 34.27 miles (55.15 km) were maintained by the municipality, 9.47 miles (15.24 km) by Bergen County and 2.20 miles (3.54 km) by the New Jersey Turnpike Authority.

The Garden State Parkway and County Route 503 pass through Woodcliff Lake.

The Garden State Parkway may be entered, southbound, or exited from, northbound, at exit 171. As all movements are not possible at that exit, exits 168 in Washington Township and 172 in Montvale are also used to access the borough.

=== Public transportation ===
Woodcliff Lake is served by NJ Transit at the Woodcliff Lake train station, located at Broadway and Woodcliff Avenue. The station offers service on the Pascack Valley Line, which runs north–south to Hoboken Terminal with connections via the Secaucus Junction transfer station to New Jersey Transit one-stop service to New York Penn Station and to other NJ Transit rail service. Connections are available at the Hoboken Terminal to other New Jersey Transit rail lines, the PATH train at the Hoboken PATH station, New York Waterways ferry service to the World Financial Center and other destinations and Hudson-Bergen Light Rail service.

Rockland Coaches offers service to the Port Authority Bus Terminal in Midtown Manhattan on routes 11 and 47/49.

== Community ==
Tice Farms was a farm and roadside stand in Woodcliff Lake. Founded in 1808, it was a local landmark which attracted families from miles around, especially in the fall, when it was noted for pumpkins, apple cider, freshly baked donuts, and other fall products. Many people would make the drive to the area from New York City, causing massive traffic jams on autumn weekends. Beginning in the 1970s, the farm was increasingly squeezed by local land development, and Richard Tice, the head of the family, repeatedly sold land to accommodate development. BMW's North American headquarters are located on Chestnut Ridge Road, and is built, and currently being expanded on land once owned by the Tice family. The company is the town's predominant landowner. Tice Farms is now Tice's Corner, an upscale strip mall.

Van Riper's Farm, formerly located approximately across the street from Tice's, was founded in the late 18th century and known for its apple cider and annual turkey shoot. It was closed to make way for an A&P supermarket, which was known as the company's trademark store. The store was acquired by Acme Markets in 2015 and finally closed in 2019. The current site is a Whole Foods Market, which opened in July 2022.

A small reminder of Woodcliff Lake's rural history is Fusco's Market, located on the corner of Werimus and Saddle River Roads. There are still a few small private farms operated in the borough, including 18 acres (7.3 ha) of land assessed as farmland for property tax purposes in 2012. One of note is the Woodcliff Acres Horse Farm located on Woodcliff Avenue in between Pascack Road and Weirumus Road, which has been a continually operating horse farm for over 50 years. Nearby is the Old Mill Pond, which was established as the town's swimming pool around 1950 when the borough acquired the small, nearly silted-up mill pond near the headwaters of the Musquapsink Brook. Old Mill Pond has been renovated to include a partial sand beach along with a water slide, two diving boards, swimming lanes, and other water activities for kids.

Woodcliff Lake lacks its own public library; however, it offers its residents reimbursement if they pay for a library membership from a neighboring municipality with its own library.

The borough was originally assigned the ZIP Code 07680. As part of post office consolidation in the early 1970s, it lost its postmaster (though not its post office) and was designated a branch of the Westwood post office, sharing the ZIP code 07675. Following longtime public protest, it regained its own ZIP code, 07677, as of July 2000.

== Notable people ==
People who were born in, residents of, or otherwise closely associated with Woodcliff Lake include:

- Jack Antonoff (born 1984), singer, musician, songwriter and record producer known for his work with the bands Fun and Bleachers
- Bruce Beresford-Redman (born 1971), co-creator and executive producer of MTV's Pimp My Ride
- Bkorn (born 1991), record producer
- Mark Denbeaux (born 1943), law professor at Seton Hall University School of Law and the director of its Center for Policy and Research
- Jon Doscher (born 1971), film producer, actor, director and writer
- Steven M. Goldman, Commissioner of the New Jersey Department of Banking and Insurance from 2006 to 2009
- Kerri Green (born 1967), actress who appeared in The Goonies
- Rick Hurvitz, co-creator and executive producer of MTV's Pimp My Ride
- Andrew Kissel (1959–2006), real estate developer who was found murdered at his rented Greenwich, Connecticut, estate
- Aram Minnetian (born 2005), professional ice hockey player for the Texas Stars of the American Hockey League
- Joe Oriolo (1913–1985), producer of the Felix the Cat cartoons made in the 1960s and co-creator of Casper the Friendly Ghost
- Tom Papa (born 1968), comedian, actor and host of The Marriage Ref
- Randolph Perkins (1871–1936), represented New Jersey's 6th congressional district from 1921 to 1936
- Gene Perla (born 1940), jazz bassist

== In media ==
Some scenes from the fourth episode of The Jack and Triumph Show, titled "Siri", were filmed on location at Tice's Corner Marketplace.

== Sources ==
- Clayton, W. Woodford; and Nelson, William. History of Bergen and Passaic Counties, New Jersey, with Biographical Sketches of Many of its Pioneers and Prominent Men., Philadelphia: Everts and Peck, 1882.
- Municipal Incorporations of the State of New Jersey (according to Counties) prepared by the Division of Local Government, Department of the Treasury (New Jersey); December 1, 1958.
- Harvey, Cornelius Burnham (ed.), Genealogical History of Hudson and Bergen Counties, New Jersey. New York: New Jersey Genealogical Publishing Co., 1900.
- Van Valen, James M. History of Bergen County, New Jersey. New York: New Jersey Publishing and Engraving Co., 1900.
- Westervelt, Frances A. (Frances Augusta), 1858–1942, History of Bergen County, New Jersey, 1630–1923, Lewis Historical Publishing Company, 1923.
- One Hundred Years of Woodcliff Lake Heritage, 1894–1994, Woodcliff Lake Centennial Book Committee, 1997
