= Club Feathers =

Gay nightclub in River Edge, New Jersey, US

- Location within Bergen County, New Jersey
- Address: 77 Kinderkamack Road
- Location: River Edge, New Jersey, US
- Coordinates: 40.9106°N 74.0382°W
- Owner: Paul Binetti
- Type: Gay nightclub
- Public transit: New Bridge Landing station

Construction
- Opened: June 21, 1978

Website
- clubfeathers.com

Club Feathers is a gay nightclub in River Edge, New Jersey. Opened in 1978, it is the oldest in the state and the only one left in North Jersey. It is known for its live entertainment, its familial atmosphere, and its assistance to vulnerable LGBTQ youth and the local poor. The club was ordered to close in March 2020 due to the COVID-19 pandemic. Though it was able to reopen for limited outdoor service several months later, its owner, Paul Binetti, announced in June of that year that the venue was experiencing severe financial hardship, and he launched a GoFundMe page in a bid to secure enough funds to remain in business. Feathers survived its pandemic setbacks and resumed normal indoor operation in May 2021. Critics have called it a rite of passage for young LGBT New Jerseyans to visit the establishment, which is noted for its high-quality entertainment selection.

== Description ==
Owned by Paul Binetti, Club Feathers is the last operational gay nightclub in North Jersey. It is known for its live entertainment featuring drag queens, go-go dancers, karaoke and DJ sets. Its weekly event calendar, which runs from Wednesday to Sunday, normally includes "Pop Wednesday", "Latin Thursday" and "Drag Friday". Customers describe the club's atmosphere as welcoming and note its tight-knit community of staff and clientele. Binetti stated that "[t]he bond between patrons became even stronger after the Pulse nightclub shooting in Florida in 2016". Feathers is often a first stop for local LGBTQ people after they come out of the closet. It is also active in charity work: in addition to helping disadvantaged queer youth get on their feet, it cooks and serves food to the local poor.

== History ==
=== Early years and operation ===
Club Feathers opened in River Edge on June 21, 1978, making it the oldest gay nightclub in New Jersey. According to Binetti, "[Feathers] opened so that [the New Jersey LGBT] community could have a safe place to call [its] own." In the venue's early years, it was treated as unwelcome in the area: the local government attempted to shut it down it multiple times, and the building was twice set on fire with Molotov cocktails. Eddie Kallen, the club's longtime employee and its current manager, recalled: "People used to scream things out the window as they were driving by. They used to throw things at the place." The original owner fought back despite the persistent harassment. Since its inception, Feathers has also served as a de facto support center for LGBT youth. It has helped find work and housing for individuals who have been kicked out of their homes, sometimes footing the bill for their rent. On New Year's Day in 2018, a small fire broke out in a duct in the club's kitchen, shuttering the business for the day. Damage was minimal, and the venue reopened two days later.

Celebrities such as The Village People and Cardi B have been regulars at Feathers.

=== COVID-19 pandemic ===
Like all the New Jersey nightlife venues, Feathers was ordered to cease operation in March 2020 due to the COVID-19 pandemic. Binetti applied for loans from the Paycheck Protection Program in hopes of securing the club financially, but he was not granted any aid. In June, Feathers reopened for takeout and outdoor dining, functioning on a skeleton staff of four employees and receiving about 50 customers per week, down from a pre-COVID high of 1,500. Binetti changed the business model from nightclub to restaurant, hired a new chef, modified the establishment's menu, and converted its back lot into a seating area in an attempt to maximize revenue under the new arrangements. Nevertheless, although the venue had reopened on June 15, its profits for the month totaled just $1,200.

At the end of June, when Governor Phil Murphy walked back plans to reopen indoor dining, Binetti announced that Feathers would no longer be able to tide itself over with outdoor operations alone. On June 28, he launched a $75,000 GoFundMe campaign to raise the funds needed to pay off the overdue rent and taxes that the club had accrued in the four months it was closed. By July 24, donations totaled $45,000, which was enough to cover the rent. Binetti stated that the remaining balance would need to be collected within 45 days in order to keep Feathers afloat.

Celebrity performers from RuPaul's Drag Race and The Village People offered to help organize a benefit for the club, but its reduced capacity presented practical problems. As of late July, local drag queens and DJs were regularly donating socially distanced performances in Feathers' outdoor dining area to help with fundraising efforts. As of October, staple shows included a weekly drag brunch and other performances by Pissi Myles. The venue continued to host outdoor events through the 2020 holiday season, and by May 2021, it had resumed normal indoor operations, stipulating only that unvaccinated customers should wear masks.

== Reception ==
In 2020, Daniel Reynolds of The Advocate wrote that visiting Feathers is "a rite of passage for LGBTQ+ New Jerseyans in coming out". FunNewJersey.com labeled the venue one of the "Best Gay Bars in NJ", citing its "awesome events" and remarking: "[Y]ou can be sure to be entertained from the moment you walk through the doors to this iconic gay club in NJ."

== See also ==
- Impact of the COVID-19 pandemic on the LGBT community
