= Emerson station (NJ Transit) =

NJ Transit rail station

Emerson
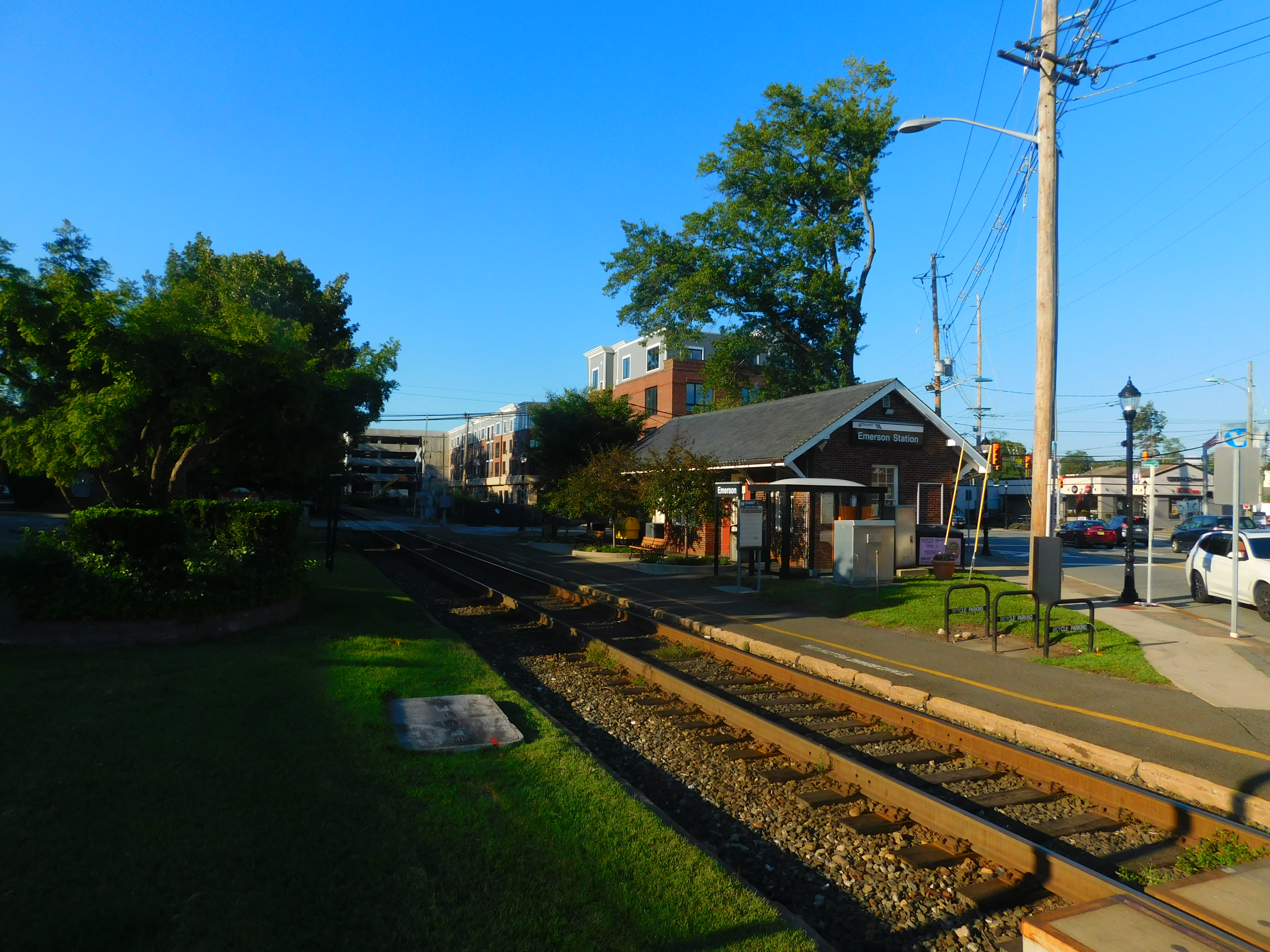
- Emerson station in August 2026.

General information
- Location: 170 Kinderkamack Road (CR 503), Emerson, New Jersey 07630
- Coordinates: 40.9751°N 74.0273°W
- Owner: New Jersey Transit
- Platforms: 1 side platform
- Tracks: 1
- Connections: NJT Bus: 165; Rockland Coaches: 11

Construction
- Parking: Yes (permit required)
- Cycle facilities: Yes

Other information
- Station code: 785 (Erie Railroad)
- Fare zone: 8

History
- Opened: March 4, 1870

Passengers
- 2025: 123 (average weekday)
- Rank: 112 of 153

Services
Preceding station	NJ Transit	Following station
Westwood toward Spring Valley	Pascack Valley Line	Oradell toward Hoboken
Former services
Preceding station	Erie Railroad	Following station
Westwood toward Haverstraw	New Jersey and New York Railroad	Oradell toward Jersey City
Location

Emerson is an active commuter railroad station in the borough of Emerson, Bergen County, New Jersey. The station, serviced by trains of the Pascack Valley Line from Spring Valley in Rockland County, New York to Hoboken Terminal in Hudson County, New Jersey, is located at the intersection of Kinderkamack Road (County Route 503) and Linwood Avenue in Emerson. The next station to the north is Westwood while the next to the south is Oradell. The station has a single track and single low-level side platform along Kinderkamack Road, without handicap accessibility under the Americans with Disabilities Act of 1990.

Rail service through Emerson began on March 4, 1870, with the opening of the Hackensack and New York Extension Railroad from Anderson Street station in Hackensack to Hillsdale station in the eponymous borough. At the time of opening, the station was known as Kinderkamack. The area of Kinderkamack changed its name to Etna in 1877 when the post office changed. This changed in 1909 to Emerson.

== Station layout ==
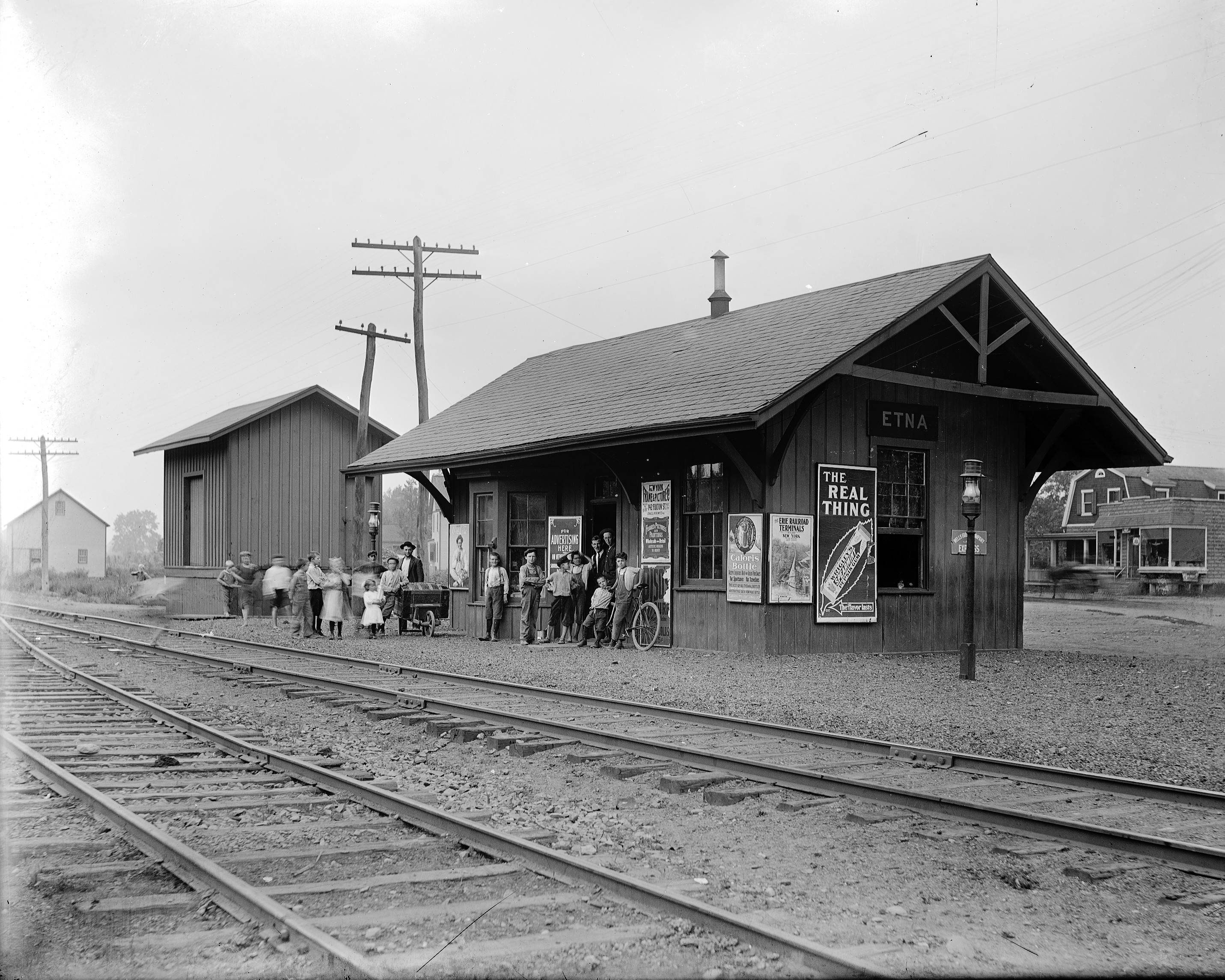
Emerson station, when it was known as Etna, c. 1907–1912

The station has one track and one low-level side platform. Permit parking is operated by the Borough of Emerson. Three permit parking lots area available, with 38, 20 and 44 spots, respectively.
