= Oradell station =

NJ Transit rail station

Oradell
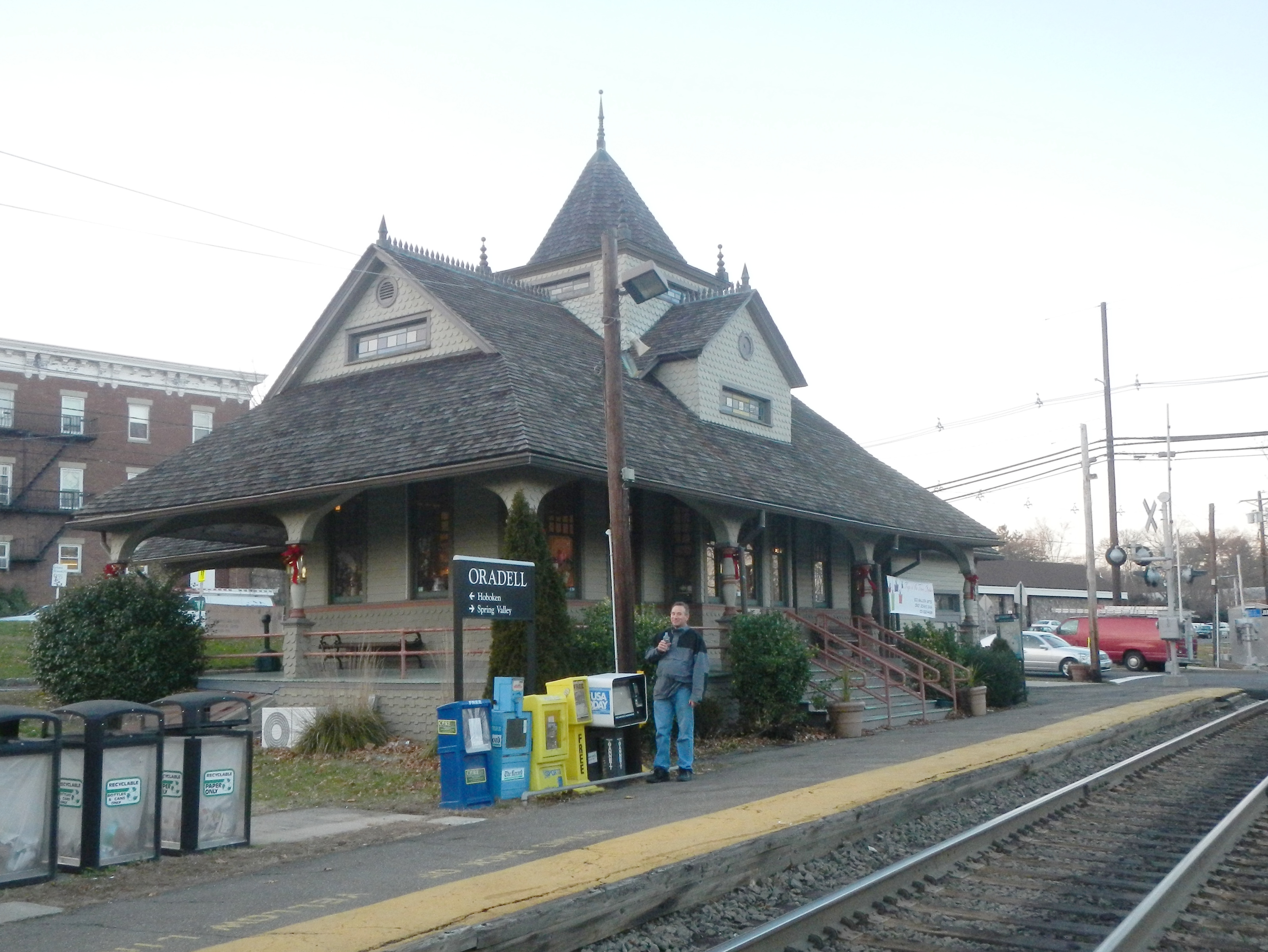
- Oradell station, south and east sides

General information
- Location: 400 Maple Avenue, Oradell, New Jersey 07649
- Coordinates: 40.9538°N 74.0302°W
- Owner: New Jersey Transit
- Platforms: 1 side platform
- Tracks: 1 (formerly 2)
- Connections: NJT Bus: 165 and 762; Rockland Coaches: 11 (all connections on Kinderkamack Road)

Construction
- Parking: Yes (permit required)
- Cycle facilities: Yes

Other information
- Station code: 783 (Erie Railroad)
- Fare zone: 7

History
- Opened: March 4, 1870; 156 years ago
- Rebuilt: 1890; 136 years ago

Passengers
- 2025: 220 (average weekday)
- Rank: 100 of 153

Services
Preceding station	NJ Transit	Following station
Emerson toward Spring Valley	Pascack Valley Line	River Edge toward Hoboken
Former services
Preceding station	Erie Railroad	Following station
Emerson toward Haverstraw	New Jersey and New York Railroad	New Milford toward Jersey City
- Oradell Station
- U.S. National Register of Historic Places
- New Jersey Register of Historic Places
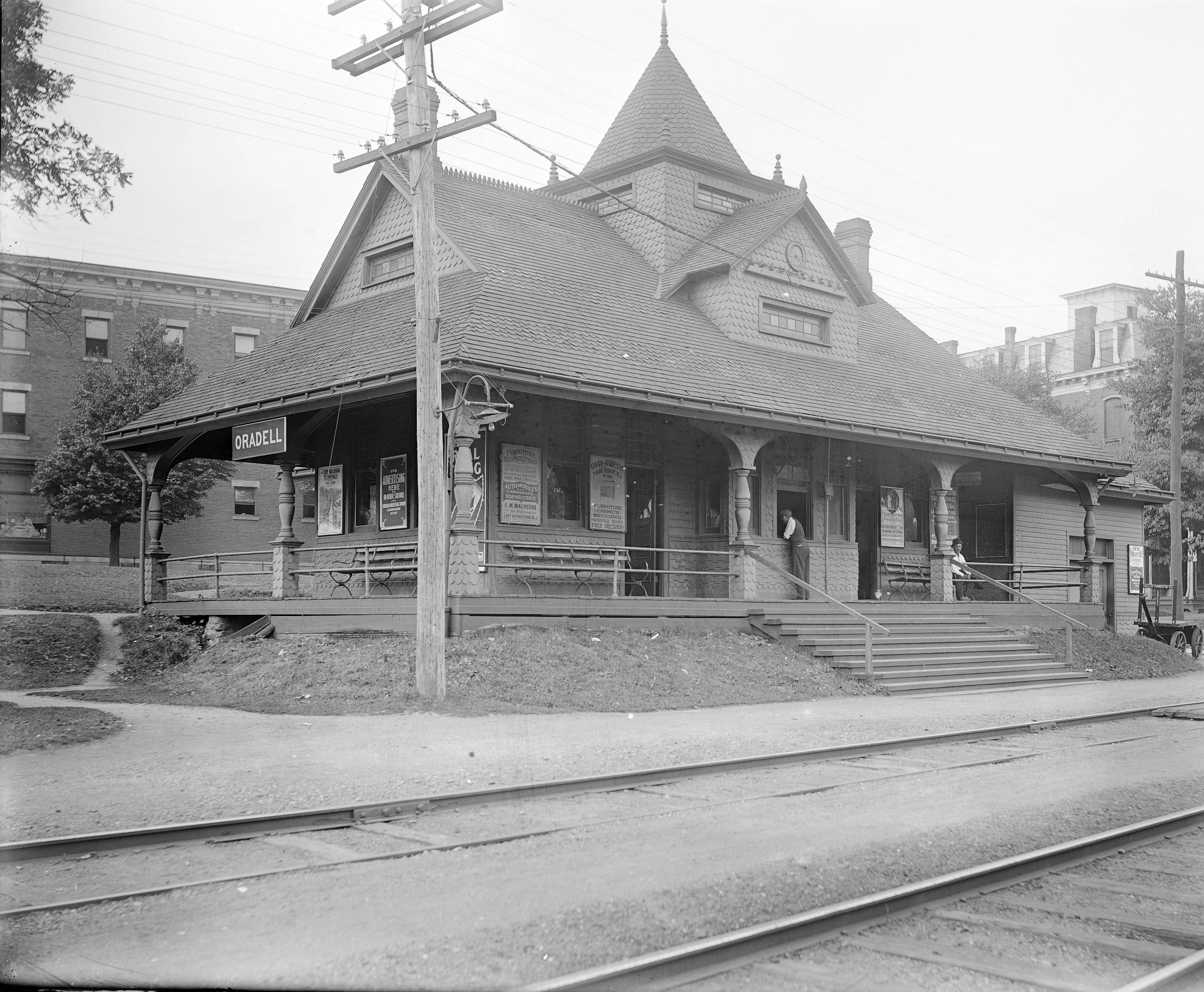
- Oradell station c. 1907–1912.
- Location: 400 Maple Avenue, Oradell, New Jersey
- Coordinates: 40°57′13″N 74°1′50″W
- Area: less than one acre
- Architectural style: Queen Anne
- MPS: Operating Passenger Railroad Stations TR
- NRHP reference No.: 84002575
- NJRHP No.: 613

Significant dates
- Added to NRHP: June 22, 1984
- Designated NJRHP: March 17, 1984
Location

Oradell is a grade-level commuter rail station for New Jersey Transit in the borough of Oradell, Bergen County, New Jersey. Located at the intersection of Oradell Avenue (County Route 80) and Maple Avenue, the station serves trains on the Pascack Valley Line.

== History ==
Service in Oradell began on March 4, 1870, when the Hackensack and New York Extension Railroad opened service from Anderson Street station in Hackensack to the station in Hillsdale. The station depot was rebuilt in 1890 when the station was part of the New Jersey and New York Railroad, which was part of the Erie Railroad. The borough of Oradell bought the station on November 23, 1966.

The station house has been listed in the state and federal registers of historic places since 1984 and is part of the Operating Passenger Railroad Stations Thematic Resource.

== Station layout ==
The station has one track and one low-level side platform. Three permit parking lots area available, with 117, 86 and 20 spots, respectively. Parking is operated by the Borough of Oradell.
