= Fairmount Avenue station =

Former New Jersey Transit rail station

Coordinates: 40°54′0.3234″N 74°02′25.1514″W

Fairmount Ave

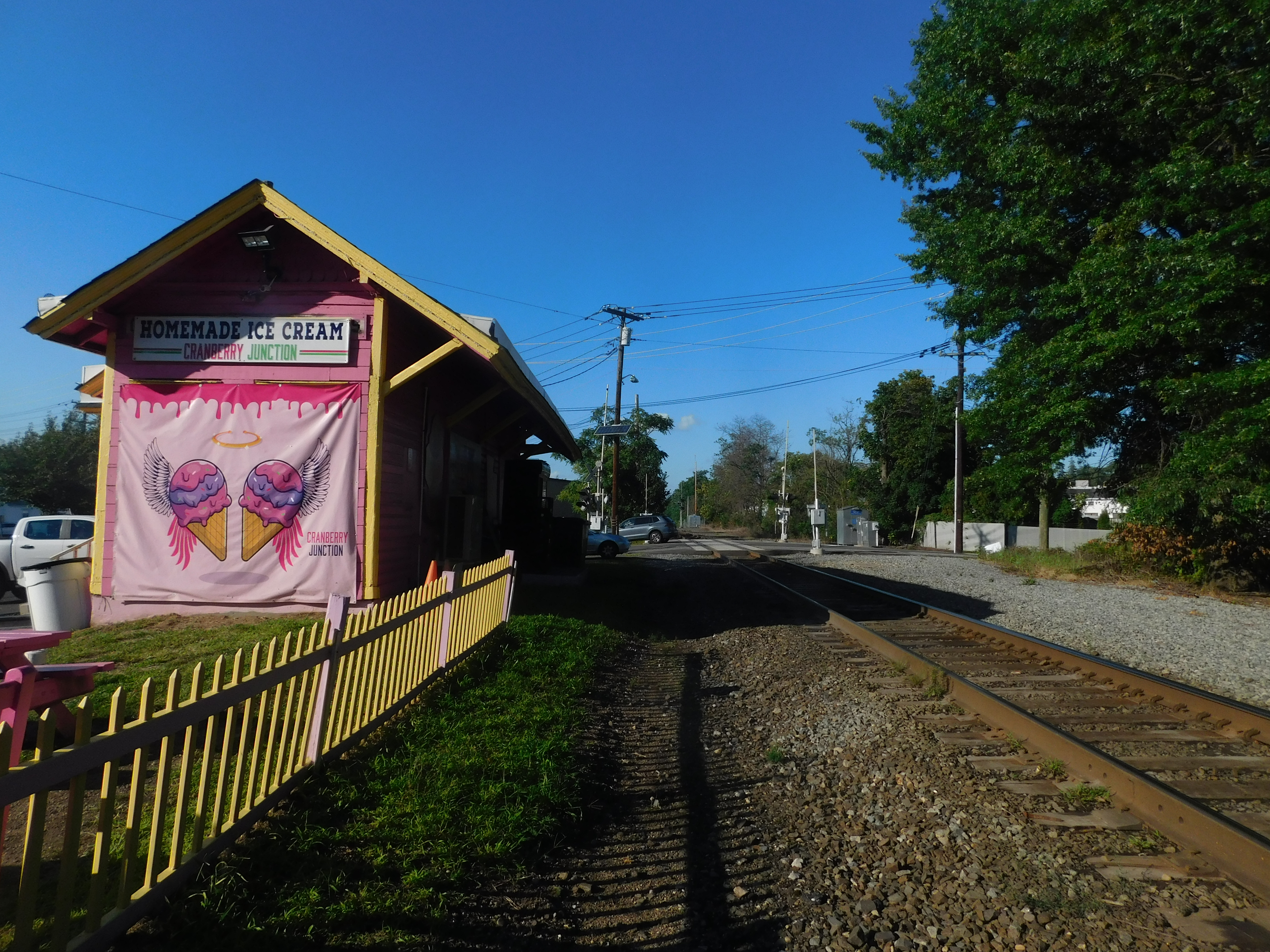
- The former Fairmount Avenue station in August 2026.

General information
- Location: 19 Temple Avenue; Hackensack, New Jersey
- Owner: New Jersey Transit (until 1983)
- Platforms: 1 side platform
- Tracks: 1 (formerly 3)

Other information
- Station code: 775 (Erie Railroad)
- Fare zone: 5

History
- Opened: March 4, 1870; 156 years ago
- Closed: 1983

Former services
Preceding station	NJ Transit	Following station
North Hackensack toward Spring Valley	Pascack Valley Line	Anderson Street toward Hoboken
Preceding station	Erie Railroad	Following station
North Hackensack toward Haverstraw	New Jersey and New York Railroad	Anderson Street toward Jersey City
Location

Fairmount Avenue station is a defunct commuter railroad station in the city of Hackensack, Bergen County, New Jersey. Located on Memorial Way in Hackensack's Fairmount Park, the station served trains of NJ Transit's Pascack Valley Line between Spring Valley station in Spring Valley, New York and Hoboken Terminal in Hoboken, New Jersey. Fairmount Avenue was one of three stations in Hackensack for NJ Transit, the others being Anderson Street and Essex Street. Fairmount Avenue station consisted of two low-level side platforms and a small station depot on the southbound platform.

== History ==
=== Hackensack and New York Railroad ===
The original alignment of the Fairmount Avenue station dates back to the chartering of the Hackensack and New York Railroad in 1856 by David P. Patterson of Hillsdale and other local investors. Their intent in creating the rail line was to help maintain a steam-powered train line in the Pascack Valley and have future ambitions to build the system northward. Construction on the new 21-mile (34 km) long line began in 1866, with trains heading from New York City to the Passaic Street station in Hackensack. Although Hackensack was not a large hub, there were several rail lines serving the city, including the New Jersey Midland Line (now the New York, Susquehanna and Western Railroad) with stops at Main Street (at the Mercer Street intersection) and at Prospect Avenue. During the 1860s, service was extended to north, terminating at Essex Street. Although most Hackensack and New York trains ended at Passaic Street, service was extended northward on September 5, 1869, when that stop was abandoned in replacement for Anderson Street. By 1870, the tracks had been extended northward to Hillsdale, and public service began on the line on March 4 of that year. Trains terminated at Hillsdale with fare of only $0.75 (1870 USD), but just one year later, the extension northward. The service was extended northward to the community of Haverstraw, New York, and in 1896, the rail line was leased by the private company to the Erie Railroad.

=== Erie Railroad and station discontinuance ===
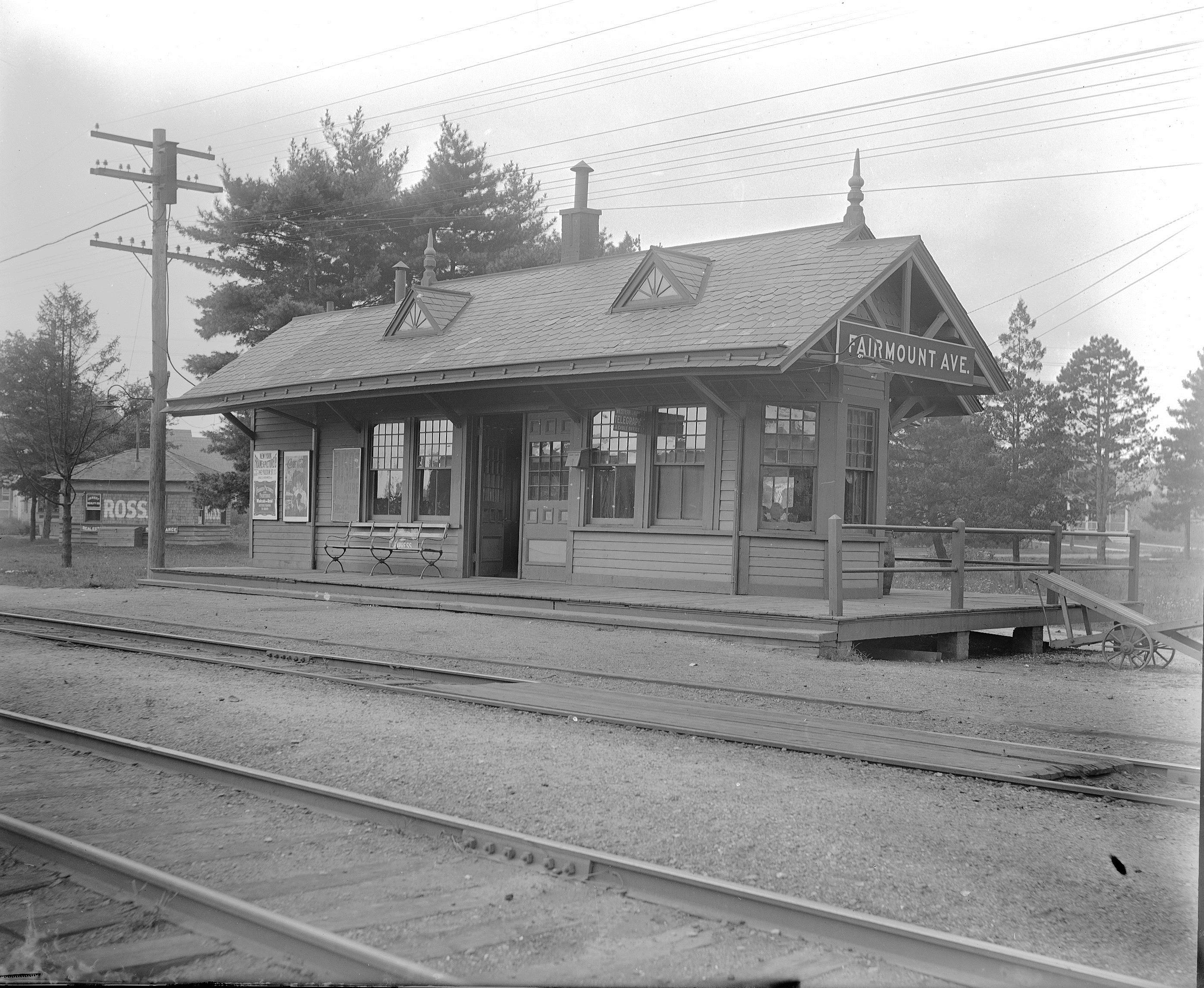
Fairmount Avenue station, c. 1907–1912

After the leasing of the New Jersey and New York Railroad to the Erie Railroad, the history of Fairmount Avenue station remained rather quiet, with minor changes to the station building and site occurring over the next seventy years. By 1966, the station building had been sold off by the Erie Railroad for private usage as Barbara's General Store and Gifts. The former team track had already been removed from the station, and only the main southbound track and partial yard remained on site with the platform. The station building was already repainted orange along the wood siding and the windows, formerly a dark green, became white. The station continued service through Hackensack as the northernmost of the three stations in Hackensack. In 1976, Conrail took over service of the former line vacated by the Erie Lackawanna (a merge of the Erie and Delaware, Lackawanna and Western Railroads) and service of the station. By 1980, during partial ownership between Conrail and New Jersey Transit, the Fairmount Avenue station remained as a part of the line, but by the 1982 timetables, was removed from service. The station building, although it does not receive any active service, remains standing in its orange and white paintjob. The station building was once used as a doughnut shop until around 2019, but now houses an ice cream shop.

== Station layout and services ==
The former Fairmount Avenue station was located at the intersection of Fairmount Avenue and Temple Avenue in the city of Hackensack, New Jersey. The building was centered in the middle of Fairmount Park and had access from Temple Avenue, where crossing gates were visible. The three tracks and gravel platform split the station from a large parking lot nearby. There was also a small gravel parking lot on the southern side of the station. To the north of the station was a stone interlocking tower at the intersection with Main Street. The Fairmount Avenue station had a shingled-roof with a large, angled canopy, and a beige wood siding. There was one asphalt platform servicing all three tracks, and the long canopy over the platform was made in similar design to Newark's 4th Street station. The beige wood was also given green window-frames to benefit the look. The station contained two mainline tracks, the northbound one, and the nearby team track. There was also a third track in the opposite side working as a partial freight yard.
