= Emerson School District =

School district in Bergen County, New Jersey, US

Address
- 133 Main Street Emerson, Bergen County, New Jersey, 07630; United States
- Coordinates: 40.974835°N 74.030247°W

District information
- Grades: PreK-12
- Superintendent: Phillip H. Nisonoff
- Business administrator: John Marmora
- Schools: 3

Students and staff
- Enrollment: 1,085 (as of 2021–22)
- Faculty: 98.4 FTEs
- Student–teacher ratio: 11.0:1

Other information
- District Factor Group: GH
- Website: www.emersonschools.org
Ind.	Per pupil	District spending	Rank (*)	K-12 average	%± vs. average
1A	Total Spending	$16,755	11	$18,891	−11.3%
1	Budgetary Cost	13,262	19	14,783	−10.3%
2	Classroom Instruction	7,365	11	8,763	−16.0%
6	Support Services	1,710	8	2,392	−28.5%
8	Administrative Cost	1,881	41	1,485	26.7%
10	Operations & Maintenance	1,639	29	1,783	−8.1%
13	Extracurricular Activities	635	41	268	136.9%
16	Median Teacher Salary	56,050	13	64,043
Data from NJDoE 2014 Taxpayers' Guide to Education Spending. *Of K-12 districts with up to 1,800 students. Lowest spending=1; Highest=49

The Emerson School District is a comprehensive community public school district that serves students in pre-kindergarten through twelfth grade from Emerson, in Bergen County, in the U.S. state of New Jersey

As of the 2021–22 school year, the district, comprising three schools, had an enrollment of 1,085 students and 98.4 classroom teachers (on an FTE basis), for a student–teacher ratio of 11.0:1.

The district is classified by the New Jersey Department of Education as being in District Factor Group "GH", the third-highest of eight groupings. District Factor Groups organize districts statewide to allow comparison by common socioeconomic characteristics of the local districts. From lowest socioeconomic status to highest, the categories are A, B, CD, DE, FG, GH, I and J.

== Schools ==
Schools in the district (with 2021–22 enrollment data from the National Center for Education Statistics) are:

Elementary schools

- Memorial Elementary School with 364 students in PreK-2
  - Kristin Gagliano, principal
- Patrick M. Villano Elementary School with 232 students in grades 3-6
  - Jessica Espinoza, principal

High school

- Emerson Junior-Senior High School with 461 students in grades 7-12
  - Brian Hutchinson, principal

== Administration ==
Core members of the district's administration are:

- Philip H. Nisonoff, superintendent
- John Marmora, business administrator and board secretary

== Board of education ==
The district's board of education, composed of five members, sets policy and oversees the fiscal and educational operation of the district through its administration. As a Type II school district, the board's trustees are elected directly by voters to serve three-year terms of office on a staggered basis, with either one or two seats up for election each year held (since 2015) as part of the November general election. The board appoints a superintendent to oversee the district's day-to-day operations and a business administrator to supervise the business functions of the district.
