= Westwood station (NJ Transit) =

NJ Transit rail station

Westwood
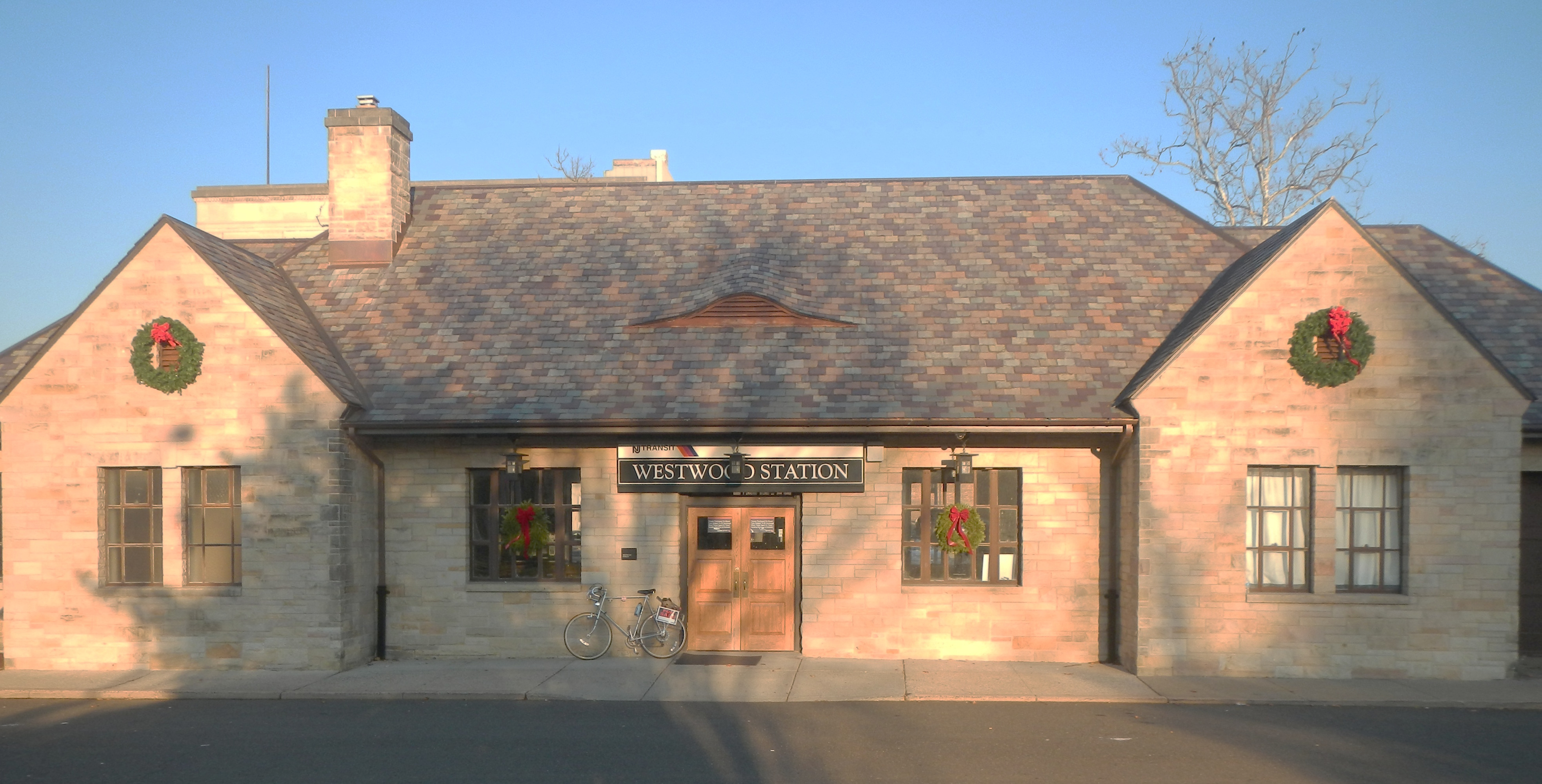
- Looking east at station depot built by Erie Railroad

General information
- Coordinates: 40.9908°N 74.0329°W
- Owner: New Jersey Transit
- Platforms: 1 side platform
- Tracks: 1
- Connections: NJT Bus: 165; Rockland Coaches: 11,84

Construction
- Parking: Yes (permit required)
- Cycle facilities: Yes
- Accessible: Yes

Other information
- Station code: 787 (Erie Railroad)
- Fare zone: 9

History
- Opened: March 4, 1870
- Rebuilt: July–November 13, 1932

Key dates
- November 3, 1932: Original station depot razed

Passengers
- 2025: 270 (average weekday)
- Rank: 90 of 153
- Westwood Railroad Station
- U.S. National Register of Historic Places
- NRHP reference No.: 100003609
- Added to NRHP: January 28, 2020

Services
Preceding station	NJ Transit	Following station
Hillsdale toward Spring Valley	Pascack Valley Line	Emerson toward Hoboken
Former services
Preceding station	Erie Railroad	Following station
Hillsdale toward Haverstraw	New Jersey and New York Railroad	Emerson toward Jersey City
Location

Westwood is an NJ Transit railroad station in Westwood, New Jersey. It is on the Pascack Valley Line and is located at Broadway and Westwood Avenue. The next station northbound, heading toward Spring Valley, New York, is Hillsdale. The next station southbound, headed for Hoboken Terminal, is Emerson. The station consists of one track, one low-level platform with a miniature high-level platform and a station depot maintained by the borough of Westwood. Westwood also maintains the parking lots, consisting of 226 parking spaces, six of which are accessible based on the Americans With Disabilities Act of 1990.

== History ==
Westwood station opened on March 4, 1870 as part of the New Jersey and New York Railroad, a 21-mile (34 km) long railroad from Pavonia Terminal to Hillsdale. The station lasted until 1932, when after 25 years of fighting between the Erie Railroad and of the borough of Westwood, a new station was built, opening on November 13. In 2020 it was listed on the National Register of Historic Places.

== Station layout ==
The station has one track and one low-level side platform. The platform is at Veteran's Memorial Park across from Broadway with its northern end at Washington Avenue and southern end at Jefferson Avenue. Permit parking is operated by the Borough of Westwood. Three permit parking lots area available, with 35, 67, 104 spots, respectively.

== See also ==
- National Register of Historic Places listings in Bergen County, New Jersey
