= River Edge station =

Rail station in New Jersey, United States

River Edge
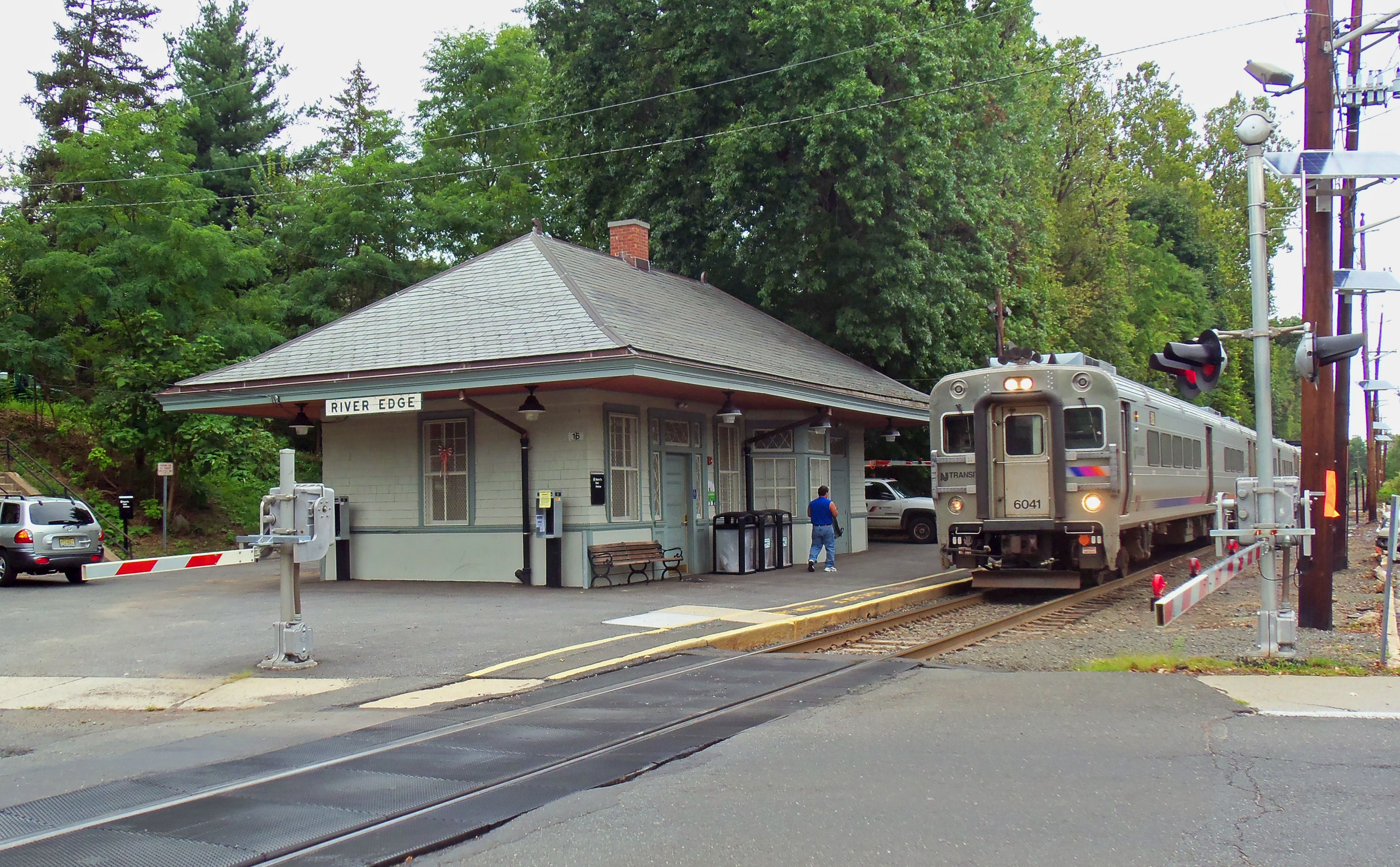
- Eastbound train arriving at River Edge in 2011

General information
- Location: River Edge Road at Park Avenue, River Edge, New Jersey 07661
- Coordinates: 40.93495°N 74.029869°W
- Owner: New Jersey Transit
- Platforms: 1 side platform
- Tracks: 1
- Connections: NJT Bus: 165 and 762; Rockland Coaches: 11 (all connections on Kinderkamack Road)

Construction
- Platform levels: 1
- Parking: Yes (permit required)
- Cycle facilities: Yes

Other information
- Station code: 779 (Erie Railroad)
- Fare zone: 6

History
- Opened: March 4, 1870; 156 years ago
- Rebuilt: September 22, 1902; 123 years ago

Passengers
- 2025: 297 (average weekday)
- Rank: 86 of 153

Services
Preceding station	NJ Transit	Following station
Oradell toward Spring Valley	Pascack Valley Line	New Bridge Landing toward Hoboken
Former services
Preceding station	Erie Railroad	Following station
New Milford toward Haverstraw	New Jersey and New York Railroad	North Hackensack toward Jersey City
Location

River Edge is a New Jersey Transit rail station on the Pascack Valley Line. The station is one of two rail stations in River Edge, New Jersey and is located at River Edge Road and Park Avenue, one block east of Kinderkamack Road (County Route 503) and three blocks west of River Road.

== History ==
The original station caught fire on February 8, 1901, from a spark from a passing train. The station was rebuilt and reopened on September 22, 1902. The station was named by a committee of donors that helped to fund the building of the new station and voted to name it River Edge station.

== Station layout ==
The station has one track and one low-level side platform, and has a heated waiting area for passengers. Permit parking is operated by the Borough of River Edge. For New Milford residents, there is a commuter lot provided by the Borough located nearly two blocks away in New Milford.

== In popular culture ==
The station can be seen in a scene of the 2008 movie Be Kind Rewind.
