= Emerson, New Jersey =

Borough in Bergen County, New Jersey, US

- Borough
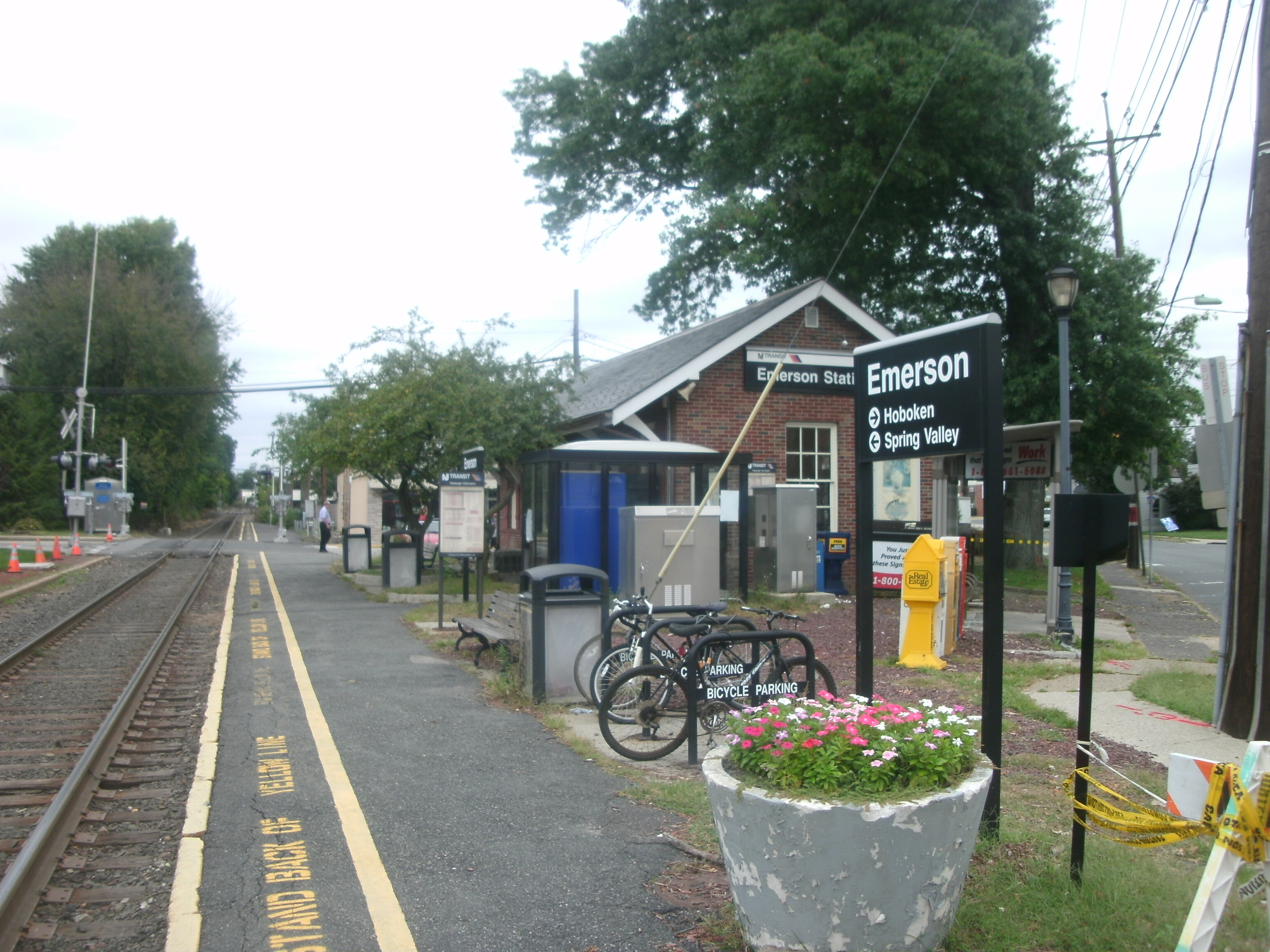
- NJ Transit station in Emerson

- coat of arms
- Nickname: "The Family Town"
- Location of Emerson in Bergen County highlighted in red (left). Inset map: Location of Bergen County in New Jersey highlighted in orange (right).

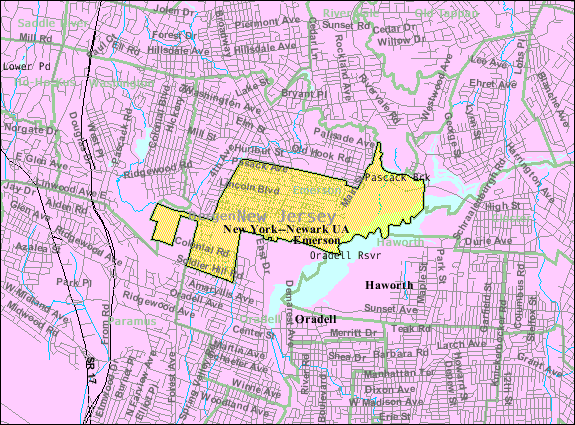
- Census Bureau map of Emerson, New Jersey

- Location in Bergen County Location in New Jersey Location in the United States
- Coordinates: 40.97499°N 74.023248°W
- Country: United States
- State: New Jersey
- County: Bergen
- Incorporated: April 8, 1903 (as Etna)
- Name changed: March 9, 1909 (to Emerson)
- Named for: Ralph Waldo Emerson

Government
  - Type: Borough
  - Body: Borough Council
  - Mayor: Danielle DiPaola (R, term ends December 31, 2026)
  - Administrator: Robert G. Hermansen
  - Municipal clerk: Triessa DeSimone

Area
  - Total: 2.42 sq mi (6.27 km^{2})
  - Land: 2.23 sq mi (5.78 km^{2})
  - Water: 0.19 sq mi (0.49 km^{2}) 7.85%
  - Rank: 379th of 565 in state 40th of 70 in county
- Elevation: 49 ft (15 m)

Population (2020)
  - Total: 7,290
  - Estimate (2023): 7,251
  - Rank: 311th of 565 in state 51st of 70 in county
  - Density: 3,267.6/sq mi (1,261.6/km^{2})
  - Rank: 205th of 565 in state 43rd of 70 in county
- Time zone: UTC−05:00 (Eastern (EST))
  - Summer (DST): UTC−04:00 (Eastern (EDT))
- ZIP Code: 07630
- Area code: 201
- FIPS code: 3400321450
- GNIS feature ID: 0885208
- Website: emersonnj.gov

Emerson is a borough in Bergen County, in the U.S. state of New Jersey, a suburb in the New York City metropolitan area. Emerson is the southernmost municipality in an area of the county known as the Pascack Valley. As of the 2020 United States census, the borough's population was 7,290, a decrease of 111 (−1.5%) from the 2010 census count of 7,401, which in turn reflected an increase of 204 (+2.8%) from the 7,197 counted in the 2000 census.

What is now Emerson was originally formed on April 8, 1903, from portions of Washington Township as the Borough of Etna, the name of a railroad station in the community. The name was changed to Emerson as of March 9, 1909.} The name came from author Ralph Waldo Emerson. The borough calls itself "The Family Town".

== Geography ==
According to the United States Census Bureau, the borough had a total area of 2.42 square miles (6.27 km^{2}), including 2.23 square miles (5.78 km^{2}) of land and 0.19 square miles (0.49 km^{2}) of water (7.85%).

Unincorporated communities, localities and place names located partially or completely within the borough include Old Hook.

The borough borders the Bergen County municipalities of Closter, Harrington Park, Haworth, Oradell, Paramus, River Vale, Washington Township and Westwood.

== Demographics ==
Historical population
Census	Pop.	Note	%±
1900	456		—
1910	767		68.2%
1920	973		26.9%
1930	1,394		43.3%
1940	1,487		6.7%
1950	1,744		17.3%
1960	6,849		292.7%
1970	8,428		23.1%
1980	7,793		−7.5%
1990	6,930		−11.1%
2000	7,197		3.9%
2010	7,401		2.8%
2020	7,290		−1.5%
2023 (est.)	7,251	▼	−0.5%
Population sources: 1910–1920 1910; 1910–1930 1900–2020; 2000 2010 2020

=== Racial and ethnic composition ===
Emerson borough, Bergen County, New Jersey – Racial and ethnic composition Note: the US Census treats Hispanic/Latino as an ethnic category. This table excludes Latinos from the racial categories and assigns them to a separate category. Hispanics/Latinos may be of any race.
Race / Ethnicity (NH = Non-Hispanic)	Pop 2000	Pop 2010	Pop 2020	% 2000	% 2010	% 2020
White alone (NH)	6,209	5,986	5,328	86.27%	80.88%	73.09%
Black or African American alone (NH)	47	64	108	0.65%	0.86%	1.48%
Native American or Alaska Native alone (NH)	4	1	4	0.06%	0.01%	0.05%
Asian alone (NH)	568	629	709	7.89%	8.50%	9.73%
Native Hawaiian or Pacific Islander alone (NH)	0	4	0	0.00%	0.05%	0.00%
Other race alone (NH)	4	4	15	0.06%	0.05%	0.21%
Mixed race or Multiracial (NH)	33	94	178	0.46%	1.27%	2.44%
Hispanic or Latino (any race)	332	619	948	4.61%	8.36%	13.00%
Total	7,197	7,401	7,290	100.00%	100.00%	100.00%

=== 2020 census ===
As of the 2020 census, Emerson had a population of 7,290. The median age was 43.9 years. 21.1% of residents were under the age of 18 and 19.9% of residents were 65 years of age or older. For every 100 females there were 94.2 males, and for every 100 females age 18 and over there were 90.2 males age 18 and over.

100.0% of residents lived in urban areas, while 0.0% lived in rural areas.

There were 2,482 households in Emerson, of which 36.1% had children under the age of 18 living in them. Of all households, 65.6% were married-couple households, 10.7% were households with a male householder and no spouse or partner present, and 20.5% were households with a female householder and no spouse or partner present. About 18.2% of all households were made up of individuals and 11.8% had someone living alone who was 65 years of age or older.

There were 2,600 housing units, of which 4.5% were vacant. The homeowner vacancy rate was 1.1% and the rental vacancy rate was 12.6%.

=== 2010 census ===
The 2010 United States census counted 7,401 people, 2,480 households, and 1,967 families in the borough. The population density was 3,358.9 per square mile (1,296.9/km^{2}). There were 2,552 housing units at an average density of 1,158.2 per square mile (447.2/km^{2}). The racial makeup was 87.31% (6,462) White, 1.08% (80) Black or African American, 0.04% (3) Native American, 8.55% (633) Asian, 0.11% (8) Pacific Islander, 1.15% (85) from other races, and 1.76% (130) from two or more races. Hispanic or Latino of any race were 8.36% (619) of the population.

Of the 2,480 households, 36.2% had children under the age of 18; 67.7% were married couples living together; 8.0% had a female householder with no husband present and 20.7% were non-families. Of all households, 18.1% were made up of individuals and 11.5% had someone living alone who was 65 years of age or older. The average household size was 2.89 and the average family size was 3.29.

23.9% of the population were under the age of 18, 6.0% from 18 to 24, 21.3% from 25 to 44, 29.0% from 45 to 64, and 19.8% who were 65 years of age or older. The median age was 44.3 years. For every 100 females, the population had 92.1 males. For every 100 females ages 18 and older there were 86.0 males.

The Census Bureau's 2006–2010 American Community Survey showed that (in 2010 inflation-adjusted dollars) median household income was $99,292 (with a margin of error of +/− $12,946) and the median family income was $108,300 (+/− $12,689). Males had a median income of $71,868 (+/− $16,071) versus $69,271 (+/− $15,233) for females. The per capita income for the borough was $39,501 (+/− $4,093). About 0.7% of families and 1.1% of the population were below the poverty line, including none of those under age 18 and 4.5% of those age 65 or over.

Same-sex couples headed 17 households in 2010, an increase from the 14 counted in 2000.

=== 2000 census ===
As of the 2000 United States census there were 7,197 people, 2,373 households, and 1,964 families residing in the borough. The population density was 3,216.3 inhabitants per square mile (1,241.8/km^{2}). There were 2,398 housing units at an average density of 1,071.7 per square mile (413.8/km^{2}). The racial makeup of the borough was 89.62% White, 0.85% African American, 0.06% Native American, 7.89% Asian, 0.88% from other races, and 0.71% from two or more races. Hispanic or Latino of any race were 4.61% of the population.

As of the 2000 Census, 2.2% of Emerson's residents identified themselves as being of Armenian-American ancestry. This was the 20th highest percentage of Armenian American people in any place in the United States with 1,000 or more residents identifying their ancestry.

There were 2,373 households, out of which 36.1% had children under the age of 18 living with them, 72.5% were married couples living together, 7.3% had a female householder with no partner present, and 17.2% were non-families. 14.5% of all households were made up of individuals, and 8.3% had someone living alone who was 65 years of age or older. The average household size was 2.91 and the average family size was 3.23.

In the borough the population was spread out, with 23.2% under the age of 18, 5.5% from 18 to 24, 27.5% from 25 to 44, 25.1% from 45 to 64, and 18.8% who were 65 years of age or older. The median age was 41 years. For every 100 females, there were 91.2 males. For every 100 females age 18 and over, there were 87.2 males.

The median income for a household in the borough was $75,556, and the median income for a family was $83,521. Males had a median income of $52,450 versus $36,818 for females. The per capita income for the borough was $31,506. About 1.3% of families and 2.4% of the population were below the poverty line, including 1.3% of those under age 18 and 4.0% of those age 65 or over.

== Economy ==
Pascack Valley Shopping Center is a shopping center located on Kinderkamack Road. It had a movie theater and bowling alley.

== Parks and recreation ==
Parks in the borough include:

- Ackerman Park, located on Ackerman Avenue. It has a playground, basketball courts, a bocci court, and picnic area.
- Centennial Park, located on Main Street, has a gazebo and walking path and a residents-only community garden (opened in 2017) managed by the Environmental Commission. It was named Centennial Park in 2003 in honor Emerson's 100th Anniversary.
- Hillman Park, located on Thomas Street, was created on land donated by borough resident Richard Hillman. It has baseball fields such as, Ken Benkovic Jr. Memorial Field, which was a majors field that is fenced in and a lighted field, and Babes Field which is also a lighted field behind the firehouse but is also located on Thomas Street. There is also a soccer field, and a playground. There is also a library and a community center located next to the park.
- Rosengart Park, sometimes referred as "Sunset Park", is a park located on Sunset Place. It has a playground.
- Veterans' Park, a memorial park located on High Street, with monuments honoring veterans from Emerson.
- Washington Park, a park located on Washington Avenue.General Washington camped at this location before heading to Delaware to cross the Delaware River.It has a playground and a picnic area.
- Emerson Woods covers approximately 19 acres (7.7 ha) of woodland along Main Street east of the high school, and is located in the buffer area of the Oradell Reservoir. The property was slated for townhouse development, but local opposition resulted in the parcel being purchased by the borough in 2001, with the aid of grants from the county and state. It remains in its natural state, with the addition of trails to make the property accessible to visitors.

== Government ==
=== Local government ===
Emerson is governed under the borough form of New Jersey municipal government, which is used in 218 municipalities (of the 564) statewide, making it the most common form of government in New Jersey. The governing body is comprised of the mayor and the borough council, with all positions elected at-large on a partisan basis as part of the November general election. A mayor is elected directly by the voters to a four-year term of office. The borough council includes six members elected to serve three-year terms on a staggered basis, with two seats coming up for election each year in a three-year cycle. The borough form of government used in Emerson is a "weak mayor / strong council" government in which council members act as the legislative body with the mayor presiding at meetings and voting only in the event of a tie. The mayor can veto ordinances subject to an override by a two-thirds majority vote of the council. The mayor makes committee and liaison assignments for council members, and most appointments are made by the mayor with the advice and consent of the council.

As of 2024, the mayor of Emerson Borough is Republican Danielle DiPaola, whose term of office ends December 31, 2026. Members of the Emerson Borough Council are Council President Michael Timmerman (R, 2026), Nicole Argenzia (R, 2025), Brian Gordon (R, 2024), Jill McGuire (R, 2025), Kelly Moore (R, 2024) and Ashley M. Rice (R, 2026).

In September 2021, the borough council selected Don Pierro from a list of three candidates nominated by the Republican municipal committee to fill the seat expiring in December 2023 that had been held by Carl Carbo until he resigned to move out of the borough.

In January 2020, the borough council selected Patricia L. Dinallo to fill the seat expiring in December 2020 that had been held by Christopher Knoller until he resigned from office late in 2019; with Dinallo taking office and Nicole Argenzia and Jill McGuire sworn in to full terms, Emerson's governing body had a female majority for the first time since the borough was established.

In January 2019, the borough council selected Jill McGuire from three candidates nominated by the Republican municipal committee to fill the seat expiring in December 2019 that was vacated by Danielle DiPaola when she took office as the borough's first female mayor.

Day-to-day operation of the borough is handled by Robert G Hermansen, who serves as borough administrator. The acting borough clerk is Triessa DeSimone and the CFO is Lauren Roehrer.

=== Federal, state and county representation ===
Emerson is located in the 5th Congressional District and is part of New Jersey's 39th state legislative district.

For the 119th United States Congress, New Jersey's 5th congressional district is represented by Josh Gottheimer (D, Wyckoff). New Jersey is represented in the United States Senate by Democrats Cory Booker (Newark, term ends 2027) and Andy Kim (Moorestown, term ends 2031).

For the 2026–2027 session, the 39th legislative district of the New Jersey Legislature is represented in the State Senate by Holly Schepisi (R, River Vale) and in the General Assembly by Robert Auth (R, Old Tappan) and John V. Azzariti (R, Saddle River).

Bergen County is governed by a directly elected County Executive, with legislative functions performed by a Board of County Commissioners comprised of seven members who are elected at-large to three-year terms in partisan elections on a staggered basis, with either two or three seats coming up for election each November; a Chairman and Vice Chairman are selected from among its seven members at a reorganization meeting held every January. As of 2025, the county executive is James J. Tedesco III (D, Paramus), whose four-year term of office ends December 31, 2026.

Bergen County's Commissioners are Chair Mary J. Amoroso (D, Mahwah, 2025), Vice Chair Steven A. Tanelli (D, North Arlington, 2027), Chair Pro Tem Joan Voss (D, Fort Lee, 2026), Rafael Marte (D, Bergenfield, 2026), Germaine M. Ortiz (D, Emerson, 2025), Thomas J. Sullivan Jr. (D, Montvale, 2025) and Tracy Silna Zur (D, Franklin Lakes, 2027).

Bergen County's elected constitutional officials are Clerk John S. Hogan (D, Northvale, 2026), Sheriff Anthony Cureton (D, Englewood, 2027) and Surrogate Michael R. Dressler (D, Cresskill, 2026).

=== Politics ===
As of March 2011, there were a total of 4,690 registered voters in Emerson, of which 905 (19.3% vs. 31.7% countywide) were registered as Democrats, 2,025 (43.2% vs. 21.1%) were registered as Republicans and 1,759 (37.5% vs. 47.1%) were registered as Unaffiliated. There was one voter registered to another party. Among the borough's 2010 Census population, 63.4% (vs. 57.1% in Bergen County) were registered to vote, including 83.3% of those ages 18 and over (vs. 73.7% countywide).

Gubernatorial election results for Emerson
Year	Republican		Democratic		Third party(ies)	
Year	No.	%	No.	%	No.	%
2025	1,841	52.80%	1,638	46.97%	8	0.23%
2021	1,746	58.16%	1,243	41.41%	13	0.43%
2017	1,088	50.39%	1,039	48.12%	32	1.48%
2013	1,716	69.36%	742	29.99%	16	0.65%
2009	1,547	56.46%	1,042	38.03%	151	5.51%
2005	1,406	54.04%	1,146	44.04%	50	1.92%

In the 2016 presidential election Republican Donald Trump received 2,188 votes (55.2%), ahead of Democrat Hillary Clinton with 1,629 votes (40.9%) and other candidates with 150 votes (3.8%). In the 2012 presidential election, Republican Mitt Romney received 2,019 votes (55.7% vs. 43.5% countywide), ahead of Democrat Barack Obama with 1,532 votes (42.3% vs. 54.8%) and other candidates with 31 votes (0.9% vs. 0.9%), among the 3,623 ballots cast by the borough's 4,899 registered voters, for a turnout of 74.0% (vs. 70.4% in Bergen County). In the 2008 presidential election, Republican John McCain received 2,206 votes (56.7% vs. 44.5% countywide), ahead of Democrat Barack Obama with 1,636 votes (42.0% vs. 53.9%) and other candidates with 28 votes (0.7% vs. 0.8%), among the 3,893 ballots cast by the borough's 4,922 registered voters, for a turnout of 79.1% (vs. 76.8% in Bergen County). In the 2004 presidential election, Republican George W. Bush received 2,228 votes (58.2% vs. 47.2% countywide), ahead of Democrat John Kerry with 1,553 votes (40.6% vs. 51.7%) and other candidates with 23 votes (0.6% vs. 0.7%), among the 3,829 ballots cast by the borough's 4,913 registered voters, for a turnout of 77.9% (vs. 76.9% in the whole county).

Presidential elections results
Year	Republican	Democratic
2024	54.8% 2,403	42.8% 1,879
2020	51.8% 2,441	47.0% 2,211
2016	55.2% 2,188	40.9% 1,629
2012	55.7% 2,019	42.3% 1,532
2008	56.7% 2,206	42.0% 1,636
2004	58.2% 2,228	40.6% 1,553

In the 2013 gubernatorial election, Republican Chris Christie received 69.4% of the vote (1,716 cast), ahead of Democrat Barbara Buono with 30.0% (742 votes), and other candidates with 0.6% (16 votes), among the 2,547 ballots cast by the borough's 4,753 registered voters (73 ballots were spoiled), for a turnout of 53.6%. In the 2009 gubernatorial election, Republican Chris Christie received 1,547 votes (55.7% vs. 45.8% countywide), ahead of Democrat Jon Corzine with 1,042 votes (37.5% vs. 48.0%), Independent Chris Daggett with 140 votes (5.0% vs. 4.7%) and other candidates with 11 votes (0.4% vs. 0.5%), among the 2,779 ballots cast by the borough's 4,824 registered voters, yielding a 57.6% turnout (vs. 50.0% in the county).

United States Senate election results for Emerson1
Year	Republican		Democratic		Third party(ies)	
Year	No.	%	No.	%	No.	%
2024	2,258	54.44%	1,839	44.33%	51	1.23%
2018	1,766	58.25%	1,187	39.15%	79	2.61%
2012	1,778	54.01%	1,475	44.81%	39	1.18%
2006	1,607	57.43%	1,154	41.24%	37	1.32%

United States Senate election results for Emerson2
Year	Republican		Democratic		Third party(ies)	
Year	No.	%	No.	%	No.	%
2020	2,349	51.41%	2,170	47.49%	50	1.09%
2014	1,142	50.00%	1,106	48.42%	36	1.58%
2013	780	54.51%	644	45.00%	7	0.49%
2008	1,922	54.77%	1,549	44.14%	38	1.08%

== Education ==
The Emerson School District serves public school students in pre-kindergarten through twelfth grade. As of the 2021–22 school year, the district, comprised of three schools, had an enrollment of 1,085 students and 98.4 classroom teachers (on an FTE basis), for a student–teacher ratio of 11.0:1. Schools in the district (with 2021–22 enrollment data from the National Center for Education Statistics) are Memorial Elementary School with 364 students in PreK-2, Patrick M. Villano Elementary School with 232 students in grades 3-6 and Emerson Junior-Senior High School with 461 students in grades 7-12.

Public school students from the borough, and all of Bergen County, are eligible to attend the secondary education programs offered by the Bergen County Technical Schools, which include the Bergen County Academies in Hackensack, and the Bergen Tech campus in Teterboro or Paramus. The district offers programs on a shared-time or full-time basis, with admission based on a selective application process and tuition covered by the student's home school district.

Assumption Academy, which had operated under the auspices of the Roman Catholic Archdiocese of Newark, closed its elementary school program for grades 1–8 in June 2012 due to declining enrollment, which it had been struggling to keep up for several years prior.

== Transportation ==
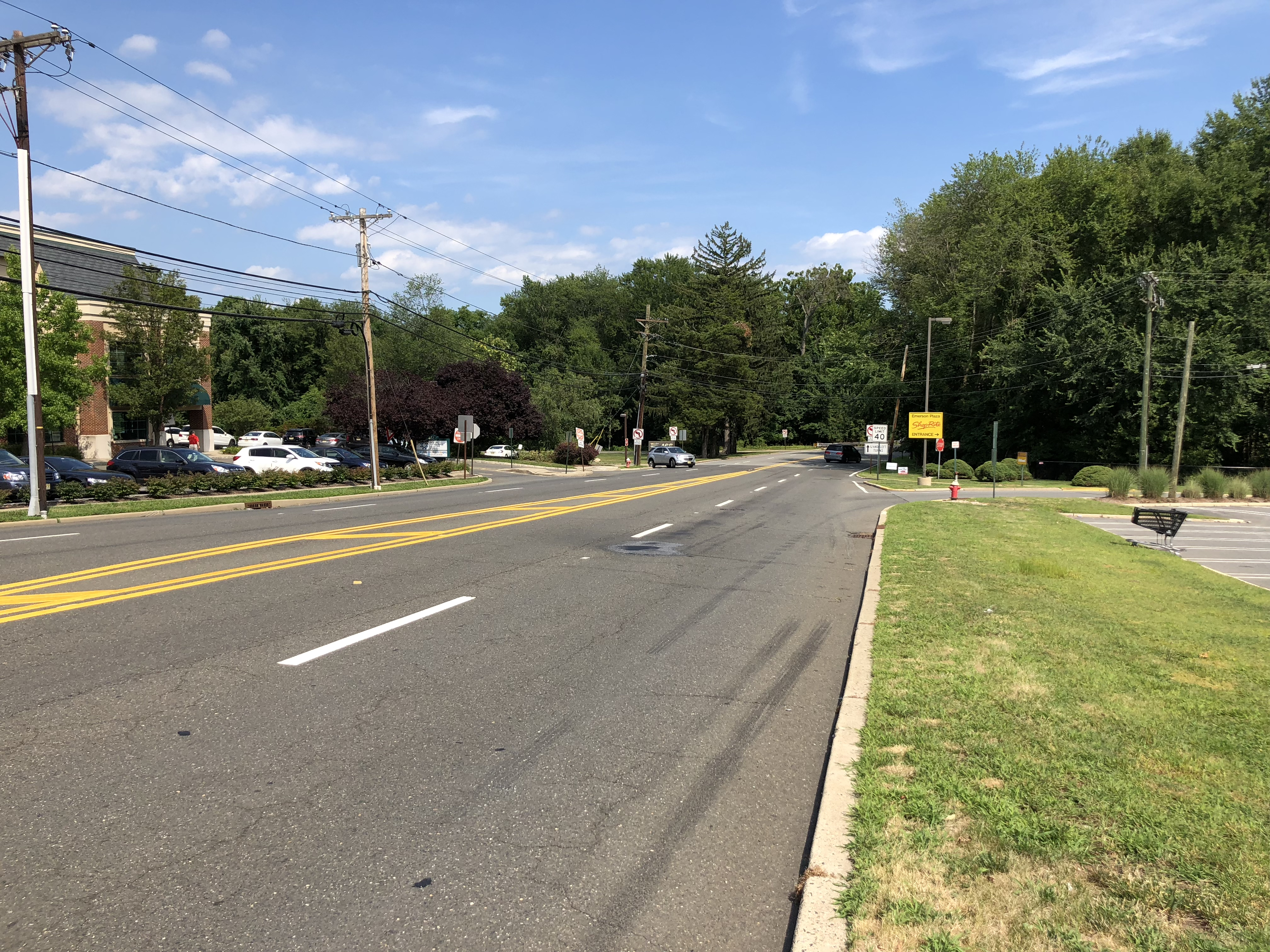
View east along County Route 502 in Emerson

=== Roads and highways ===
As of May 2010, the borough had a total of 30.87 miles (49.68 km) of roadways, of which 28.54 miles (45.93 km) were maintained by the municipality and 2.33 miles (3.75 km) by Bergen County.

The most significant roads serving Emerson are County Route 502 (Old Hook Road) and County Route 503 (Kinderkamack Road).

=== Public transportation ===
The Emerson station, located at the intersection of Linwood Avenue and Kinderkamack Road, provides service on NJ Transit's Pascack Valley Line. This line runs north–south to Hoboken Terminal with connections via the Secaucus Junction transfer station to NJ Transit one-stop service to New York Penn Station and to ten other NJ Transit rail lines. Connections are available at the Hoboken Terminal to other NJ Transit rail lines, the PATH train at the Hoboken PATH station, New York Waterways ferry service to the World Financial Center and other destinations and Hudson-Bergen Light Rail service.

NJ Transit provides bus service on the 165 route to and from the Port Authority Bus Terminal in Midtown Manhattan.

Rockland Coaches routes 11A/11AT provide service to the Port Authority Bus Terminal and to Rockland County, New York.

== Bomb threat ==
On September 19, 2007, there was a threat made to the Emerson School System. A letter addressed to Emerson Mayor Lou Lamatina was received around 10:30 a.m. in a small envelope, along with what appeared to be a computer-printed address pasted onto the front, authorities said. The note inside appeared to also be computer-generated, and was pasted on a blank piece of paper; it read, "All three schools will be blown out on Thursday, Sept. 20th at 11:30 a.m., with two other schools in nearby towns." The note was later sent to the Bergen County Sheriff's Office for forensic examination.

All three Emerson Schools were immediately evacuated by a fire drill around 11:00, and neither students nor teachers were allowed to collect any of their belongings, including backpacks, cell phones, and purses. Seniors were allowed to retrieve their cars later that day, but nobody else was allowed near the school.

Members of the Bergen County bomb squad were sent to Emerson on Wednesday morning; however, a search of the district's schools revealed nothing dangerous or extraordinary. The bomb squad also searched Oradell and Washington Township schools, and searched Emerson's Assumption Academy on Thursday morning.

Thirteen districts closed their schools for September 20, 2007, including Emerson, Westwood, Washington Township, Oradell, River Edge, Closter, River Vale, Demarest, Haworth, Harrington Park, Northvale, Norwood, and Old Tappan. Some selected Catholic grammar and high schools were closed. The bomb threat affected 12,000–14,000 students, including 1,200 from Emerson alone. The schools were closed for two days until they were deemed safe.

== Points of interest ==
- Cedar Park Cemetery
- Emerson Public Library was formed in 1957 and moved to its current facility in 1974.
- Soldier Hill Golf Club – The Bergen County Freeholders spent $8.5 million to acquire the semi-private course, which opened in 1963 and covers portions of both Emerson and Oradell near the Oradell Reservoir on 140 acres (57 ha) of land that had been owned by United Water until it sold off the property in 2008.

== Notable people ==
People who were born in, residents of, or otherwise closely associated with Emerson include:

- Aron Abrams (1960–2010), screenwriter
- Thomas Fitzpatrick (1930–2009), pilot known for two intoxicated flights where he flew from New Jersey and landed on the streets of New York City
- Nicki Gross (born 1989), assistant coach for the Iowa Energy of the NBA G League
- Kevin Higgins (born 1955), assistant football coach and WR coach at Wake Forest University
- Sonny Igoe (1923–2012), jazz drummer
- Andy Papathanassiou, pit crew coordinator of NASCAR's Hendrick Motorsports

== Sources ==
- Municipal Incorporations of the State of New Jersey (according to Counties) prepared by the Division of Local Government, Department of the Treasury (New Jersey); December 1, 1958.
- Clayton, W. Woodford; and Nelson, Nelson. History of Bergen and Passaic Counties, New Jersey, with Biographical Sketches of Many of its Pioneers and Prominent Men. Philadelphia: Everts and Peck, 1882.
- Harvey, Cornelius Burnham (ed.), Genealogical History of Hudson and Bergen Counties, New Jersey. New York: New Jersey Genealogical Publishing Co., 1900.
- Van Valen, James M. History of Bergen County, New Jersey. New York: New Jersey Publishing and Engraving Co., 1900.
- Westervelt, Frances A. (Frances Augusta), 1858–1942, History of Bergen County, New Jersey, 1630–1923, Lewis Historical Publishing Company, 1923.
