= Nicki Gross =

American basketball coach (born 1989)

Vanderbilt Commodores
- Position: Assistant to the head coach
- League: Southeastern Conference

Personal information
- Born: July 24, 1989 (age 37) Emerson, New Jersey, U.S.

Career information
- High school: Academy of the Holy Angels
- College: Seton Hall
- Coaching career: 2012–present

Career history

Coaching
- 2012–2013: Monmouth (graduate manager)
- 2013–2014: Bakersfield Jam (assistant VC)
- 2014–2015: Iowa Energy (VC, assistant)
- 2015–2016: Iowa Energy (assistant)
- 2016–2019: Raptors 905 (assistant)
- 2019–present: Vanderbilt (assistant)

Nicki Gross (born July 24, 1989) is an assistant for the Vanderbilt Commodores of the Southeastern Conference.

== Early life and education ==
A native of Emerson, New Jersey, Gross graduated from the Academy of Holy Angels in 2007.

Gross played for Seton Hall's women's soccer team as a midfielder. In 2009, she was named Big East Player of the Week and earned MVP honors at the 2009 St. John's Tournament. Gross received a Bachelor of Science degree in biology.

She then worked as a graduate manager for Monmouth University's men's basketball team during the 2012–2013 season while working on her MBA degree.

== NBA Development League ==
Gross initially entered the NBA Development League as the Assistant Video Coordinator for the Bakersfield Jam, the NBA Development League affiliate of the Phoenix Suns. She remained in Bakersfield through the 2013–2014 D-League season.

She was hired by the Iowa Energy of the NBA Development League on July 30, 2015. The Iowa Energy are the NBA Development League affiliate of the Memphis Grizzlies. At the time of her hiring, Gross was the only female assistant coach in the NBA D-League.

Gross would later be hired by the Toronto Raptors to be the player development coach of their D-League affiliate, the Raptors 905 on November 4, 2016. She served under head coach and former NBA All-Star player, Jerry Stackhouse.

== College ==
On April 18, 2019, she followed former Raptors 905 head coach Jerry Stackhouse to the Vanderbilt Commodores in the same role she served in the NBA G League.
