= Emerson Junior-Senior High School =

Place in Mercer County, New Jersey, US

Location
- 131 Main Street; Emerson, Bergen County, New Jersey 07630; United States; 40.97403°N 74.01609°W

Information
- Type: Public high school
- Established: January 1963
- School district: Emerson School District
- NCES School ID: 340471000380
- Principal: Brian Hutchinson
- Faculty: 47.3 FTEs
- Grades: 7–12
- Enrollment: 440 (as of 2024–25)
- Student to teacher ratio: 9.3:1
- Colors: Red; Black and white
- Athletics conference: North Jersey Interscholastic Conference
- Team name: Cavaliers ("Cavos")
- Newspaper: The Cavo Chronicles
- Website: ejshs.emersonschools.org

Emerson Junior-Senior High School is a six-year public high school that serves students in seventh through twelfth grade from Emerson, in Bergen County, in the U.S. state of New Jersey, operating as the lone secondary school of the Emerson School District. The school has been accredited by the Middle States Association of Colleges and Schools Commission on Elementary and Secondary Schools since 1968.

As of the 2024–25 school year, the school had an enrollment of 440 students and 47.3 classroom teachers (on an FTE basis), for a student–teacher ratio of 9.3:1. There were 52 students (11.8% of enrollment) eligible for free lunch and 11 (2.5% of students) eligible for reduced-cost lunch.

== History ==
The district announced plans in December 1960 for a junior-senior high school facility that would serve an enrollment of 860 students and would be constructed on a site covering 40 acres (16 ha). The new school would allow the district to end a sending/receiving relationship under which Emerson students attended Hackensack High School.

An August 1962 tornado caused significant damage to the construction site for the new high school, ripping off significant portions of the roof, twisting girders and knocking over masonry.

The school was completed at a cost of $2.3 million (equivalent to $24.2 million in 2025), opening to students in March 1963 after the August tornado caused over $70,000 in damage and prevented the school from opening in September 1962 as originally planned, with students who had enrolled at Hackensack High School completing their education there through graduation.

In 2020, Emerson Junior-Senior High School, was used as a filming location in the movie Chemical Hearts, starring Lili Reinhart.

== Awards, recognition and rankings ==
The school was the 85th-ranked public high school in New Jersey out of 339 schools statewide in New Jersey Monthly magazine's September 2014 cover story on the state's "Top Public High Schools", using a new ranking methodology. The school had been ranked 77th in the state of 328 schools in 2012, after being ranked 34th in 2010 out of 322 schools listed. The magazine ranked the school 55th in 2008 out of 316 schools. The school was ranked 51st in the magazine's September 2006 issue, which included 316 schools across the state. Schooldigger.com ranked the school tied for 99th out of 381 public high schools statewide in its 2011 rankings (an increase of 8 positions from the 2010 ranking) which were based on the combined percentage of students classified as proficient or above proficient on the mathematics (85.7%) and language arts literacy (97.6%) components of the High School Proficiency Assessment (HSPA).

EHS also has an award-winning journalism program, having won several prestigious awards for its Adopt-A-Journalist Program under the guidance of Ava Annese and The Record. Recent adopted journalists include Pulitzer Prize-nominated photographer Thomas E. Franklin, ESPN-online writer Bob Klapisch, and stand-up comic and The Record columnist Bill Ervolino. Awards received for the program include:

- 1999 NJ Best Practices.
- 2000 A+ for Kids Network Grant
- 2002 Newspaper Association of America Innovators in Newspaper Education Award

In 2003, Ava Annese received the New Jersey High School Teacher of Civics Education award from the VFW. In the national contest, she received third place.

Emerson's Musical Theatre program has been recognized by The Metros, Paper Mill Playhouse and the New Jersey Metropolitan chapter of The Cappies.

== Athletics ==
The Emerson High School Cavaliers (commonly known as the Cavos) participate in the North Jersey Interscholastic Conference, which is comprised of small-enrollment schools in Bergen, Hudson County, Morris County and Passaic County counties, and was created following a reorganization of sports leagues in Northern New Jersey by the New Jersey State Interscholastic Athletic Association (NJSIAA). Prior to the NJSIAA's realignment that took effect in the fall of 2010, Emerson was a member of the Bergen County Scholastic League (BCSL). With 243 students in grades 10–12, the school was classified by the NJSIAA for the 2019–20 school year as Group II for most athletic competition purposes, which included schools with an enrollment of 75 to 476 students in that grade range. The school's co-op team with Cresskill High School was classified by the NJSIAA as Group II North for football for 2024–2026, which included schools with 484 to 683 students.

The school participates as the host school / lead agency for joint cooperative girls lacrosse and wrestling teams with Park Ridge High School, while Emerson is the host school for boys / girls bowling, cross country running. boys / girls golf and boys lacrosse teams. River Dell High School is the host school for a co-op ice hockey team with Emerson and Westwood Regional High School as participants. These co-op programs operate under agreements scheduled to expire at the end of the 2023–24 school year.

Emerson is known for its wrestling team led by coach Stan Woods, who was named District, Region and New Jersey Coach of the Year for the co-operative Emerson/Park Ridge High School team of 2006–07. Woods has led his teams to 30 league championships, nine county championships, and eight state sectional championships. Woods' 602nd career victory, achieved in February 2011 with a win against Nutley High School, made him the winningest coach in New Jersey wrestling history. The wrestling team won the North I Group I state sectional championships in 1980, 1983–1987, 2001, 2003, 2018 and 2020, and won the North I Group II sectional title in 2016. The team won the Group II state championship in 2016 with a 29–28 win against Delaware Valley Regional High School in the final match of the tournament.

The girls bowling team won the overall state championship in 1976.

The baseball team won the Group I state championship in 1982 (defeating Middlesex High School in the tournament final), 1992 (vs. Arthur P. Schalick High School), 2000 (vs. Pitman High School), 2001 (vs. Keyport High School), 2015 (vs. Middlesex) and 2019 (vs. New Providence High School). The program's six state titles are tied for eighth-most in the state. Two runs scored in the first inning provided the margin needed for a 2–0 victory in the tournament finals against Middlesex to win the 1982 Group I state title. The 2000 team finished the season with a record of 26-5 after winning the Group I title by defeating Pitman by a score of 5–4 in the championship game. The team won the North I, Group I state sectional championship in 2001 with a 4–1 win over Midland Park High School in the tournament final and went on to win the Group I title with a 2–1 victory against Keyport in the championship game to finish the season with a 25–6 record. The 2015 team finished the season with a 26–5 record after defeating Middlesex High School by a score of 3–1 in the tournament final. The team won the Group I state championship in 2019, defeating Glassboro High School by a score of 8–5 in the final game of the tournament.

The 1983 football team finished the season with an 11–0 record after winning the NJSIAA North I Group I state sectional title with a 21–7 win against Saddle Brook High School in the championship game.

The 2003 boys' tennis team, as a second seed, won the school's first state championship in decades with a 3–2 win over Waldwick High School. The team again made it to the section final in 2004, but their efforts fell short with a 4–1 loss to Mountain Lakes High School.

== Extracurricular activities ==
Five students represented the school on News 12 New Jersey's and Power to Learn's NJ Challenge. Two members of the team, including the 2009 captain, competed for the team in both appearances.

In 2010, the Emerson Cavalier Marching Band won the award for best music in the Montclair band festival.

== Administration ==
The school's principal is Brian Hutchinson. Hos core administration team includes the vice principal.

== Notable alumni ==
- Kevin Higgins, assistant football coach at Wake Forest.
- Andy Papathanassiou, member of NASCAR's Hendrick Motorsports.
- Aron Abrams, television writer, producer for shows such as Grounded For Life, Everybody Hates Chris, and King of the Hill. Graduated in 1978.
