= New Bridge Landing station =

NJ Transit rail station

New Bridge Landing at River Edge
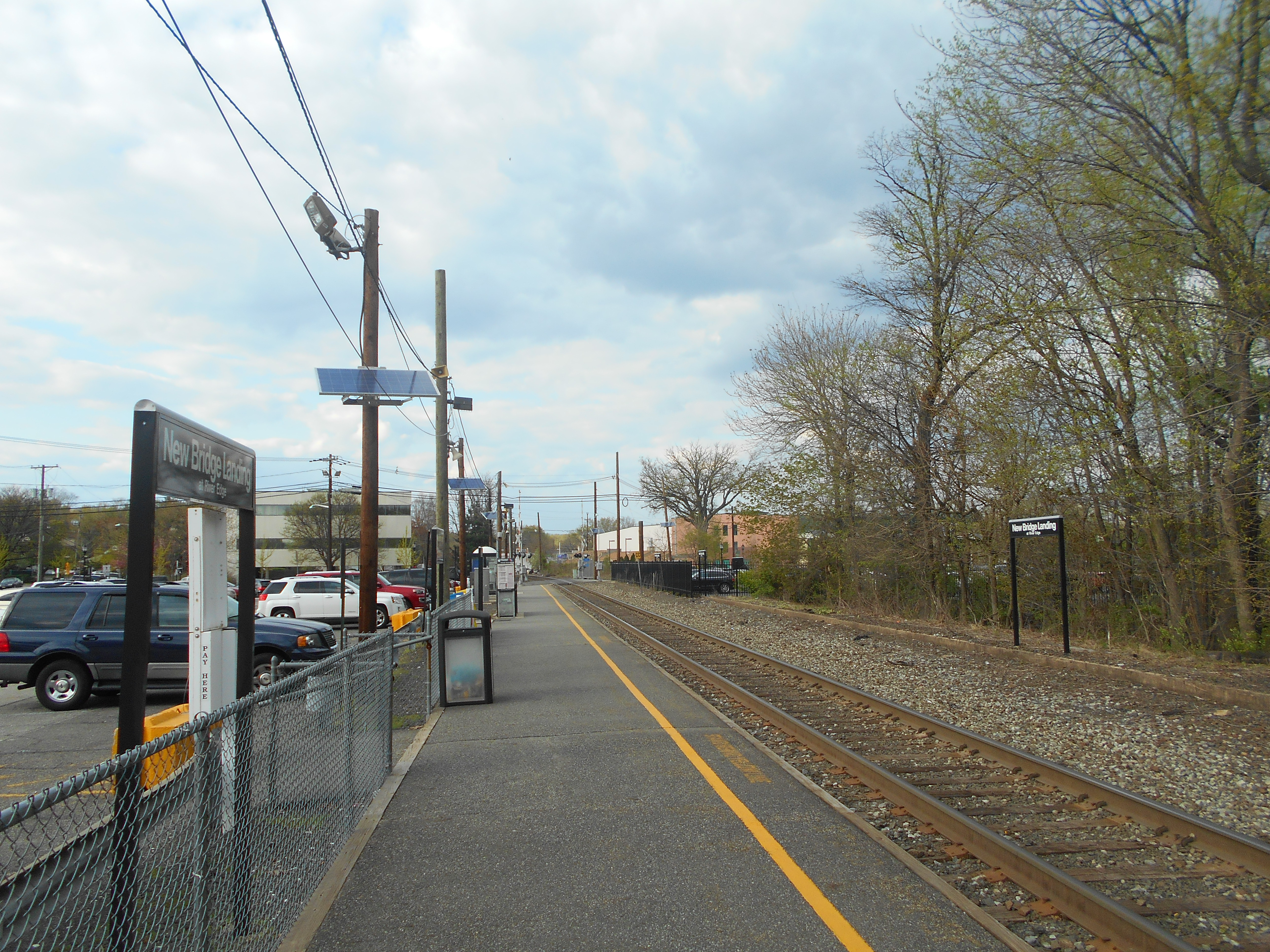
- The station at New Bridge Landing in May 2014. The former northbound platform is visible on the right side of the tracks.

General information
- Location: Kinderkamack Road (CR 503) and Grand Avenue (CR S-49), River Edge, New Jersey 07661
- Coordinates: 40.9112°N 74.035969°W
- Owner: NJ Transit
- Platforms: 1 side platform
- Tracks: 1
- Connections: NJT Bus: 165 and 762; Rockland Coaches: 11

Construction
- Parking: Yes (permit & daily)
- Cycle facilities: Yes

Other information
- Station code: 777 (Erie Railroad)
- Fare zone: 6

History
- Opened: March 4, 1870; 156 years ago
- Rebuilt: 1896; 130 years ago
- Former names: Cherry Hill (1870–1895); North Hackensack (1896–2009)

Key dates
- 1978: Station building demolished

Passengers
- 2025: 363 (average weekday)
- Rank: 74 of 153

Services
Preceding station	NJ Transit	Following station
River Edge toward Spring Valley	Pascack Valley Line	Anderson Street toward Hoboken
Former services
Preceding station	NJ Transit	Following station
River Edge toward Spring Valley	Pascack Valley Line	Fairmount Avenue (closed 1983) toward Hoboken
Preceding station	Erie Railroad	Following station
River Edge toward Haverstraw	New Jersey and New York Railroad	Fairmount Avenue toward Jersey City
Location

New Bridge Landing, signed as New Bridge Landing at River Edge, is an active commuter railroad station in the borough of River Edge, Bergen County, New Jersey. Located at the junction of Kinderkamack Road (County Route 503) and Grand Avenue (County Route S-49) and next to Route 4, the station is serviced by Pascack Valley Line trains running between Hoboken Terminal in Hoboken and Spring Valley station in the eponymous village in Rockland County, New York. The next station to the north is the eponymous River Edge and the next station to the south is Anderson Street in Hackensack. The station contains a single low-level side platform on the southbound side of the track, resulting in the station not being accessible for handicapped persons per the Americans with Disabilities Act of 1990.

Railroad service in the area began on March 4, 1870, when the Hackensack and New York Extension Railroad opened from the terminal in Hackensack to a new station in Hillsdale. At the time of opening, the station was known as Cherry Hill. In 1895, the name was changed to North Hackensack, a name it would retain until April 2009, when it was changed to New Bridge Landing, in reference to the former hamlet. The station depot at then-North Hackensack, built by the Erie Railroad, came down in 1978.

== History ==
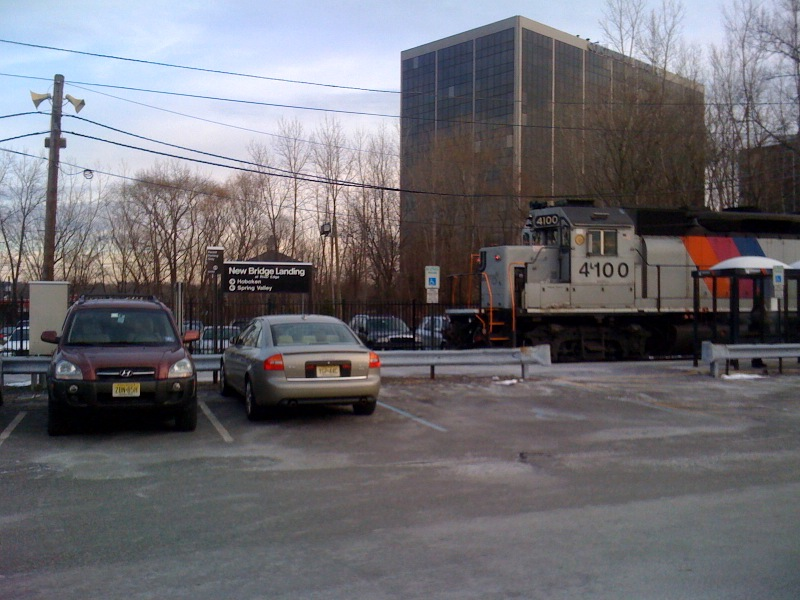
A train pulling into New Bridge Landing station

The station was built in 1870, as part of the northern extension of the New Jersey and New York Railroad from Hackensack's station at Essex Street. The station depot was demolished in 1978 and replaced by a shelter.

The station is named for the nearby tide mill hamlet New Bridge Landing, where George Washington and Thomas Paine crossed the narrows of the Hackensack River in his retreat after the loss of Fort Washington during the New York and New Jersey campaign in 1776.

Due to increased ridership from bi-directional operation, an additional 143 parking spaces were added to a permit only parking lot on August 13, 2008, bringing the total number of spaces at the station to 291.

During December 2022, the station along with the Anderson Street stop in Hackensack were awarded $18 million to make the stations more accessible. The grants will fully modernize the stations, and make them more accessible. They will also add ADA compliant ramps.

== Station layout ==
This station has one track one low-level side platform. Bicycle parking is available at the station. The station has a 291-space parking lot, which is operated by ParkAmerica.

== Service details ==
Most Pascack Valley Line trains serve all station stops, which includes New Bridge Landing. However, there are some trains that Express from Secaucus Junction to Pearl River Station under Metro-North West of Hudson, meant mainly to serve the communities in Rockland County, New York. There is also one train per day (on weekdays) that will express between Secaucus Junction and River Edge Station. Pascack train 1633 will also originate at Hoboken Terminal, make all local stops to New Bridge Landing, and then terminate. The crew/equipment will then complete a non-revenue run back to Hoboken under the train symbol X128.
