= Andy Papathanassiou =

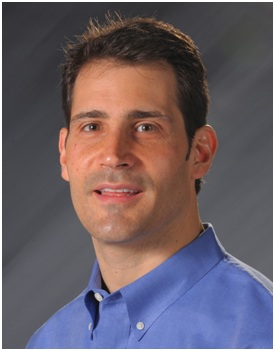
Andy Papathanassiou

Andy Papathanassiou became the first ever, "pit crew coach," when he was hired as a member of NASCAR's Hendrick Motorsports team in 1992. His philosophy and views as an outsider ultimately shifted the paradigm of how pit crews select and train their members. Previously, pit crews were composed of mechanics who devoted little time to practicing pit stops - relying instead on their vast knowledge of car building and racing experience. Andy employed an athletic mindset which centered on practice and repetition, coaching and review, innovation and process improvement. Collectively, he calls this philosophy, Over the Wall.

Papathanassiou grew up in Emerson, New Jersey. He is the son of Greek immigrants who favored education over sports. He attended Emerson Jr./Sr. High School, where, as a National Honor Society member, he played on the football team, leading it to a perfect season in 1984. Throwing the shot put, he was a USA Today All-American and held the NJ state record for over a decade. He played college football on scholarship at Stanford University, playing offensive guard. He graduated with a bachelor's degree in Economics, and a master's degree in Organizational Behavior from Stanford.

After college, he discovered NASCAR by sneaking into the garage area and volunteering with a team at the Sears Point (Infineon) Raceway in Sonoma, CA in 1990 where he saw his first pit stop. He joined Hendrick Motorsports in 1992 as the #24 DuPont team's pit crew coordinator; a first in NASCAR. Papathanassiou sought pit crew members with athletic experience. He had them practice frequently and undergo teambuilding exercises as well as strength training. Under his guidance, Jeff Gordon's 1995 pit crew frequently had the fastest pit stops, which contributed towards the team's championship. Other teams took notice, and by the late 1990s most teams had adopted Papathanassiou's methods. Teams now recruit and employ many former college athletes, and pit stop times have decreased from 18 or 19 seconds in the early 1990s to 13 seconds today.

Teams now regularly hire former players from a number of different sports who undergo rigorous training aimed at reducing pit stop time to a minimum. Team members will exercise, lift weights and use techniques to improve coordination and choreography under the direction of strength and conditioning trainers, with coaches providing guidance based on videos taken of each pit stop. Pit crew members can earn as much as $100,000.

Papathanassiou remains with Hendrick Motorsports as Director of Human Performance, a role similar to a collegiate athletic director. The Hendrick pit program encompasses scouting and recruiting, practice and training, injury rehab, nutritional and sports psychology support for the crewmembers. In 2006, in addition to his Hendrick duties, he was elected as Executive Director of the North Carolina Motorsports Association (NCMA), a position he held until 2012. The NCMA promotes the state's six billion dollar motorsports industry through events, business development, education programs, workforce development and public policy. He currently sits on the board of directors. Papathanassiou regularly gives keynote speeches and conducts teamwork seminars about the techniques he has developed and how they can be applied.
