= Essex Street station (NJ Transit) =

NJ Transit rail station

Essex Street
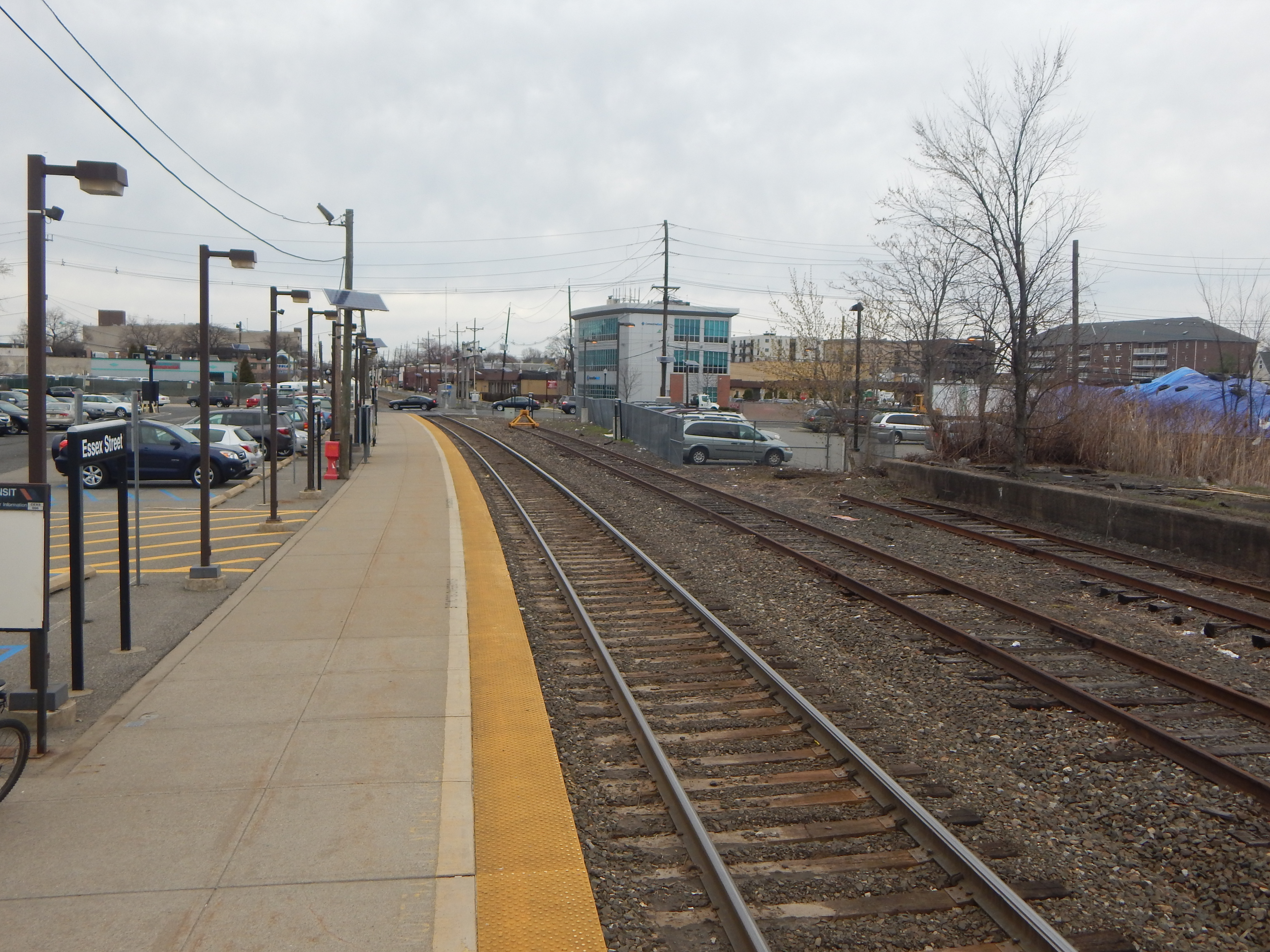
- Essex Street station in April 2015. The former 1861 station depot platform is visible on the right side.

General information
- Location: 160 Essex Street, Hackensack, Bergen County, New Jersey 07601
- Coordinates: 40.87934°N 74.051579°W
- Owner: New Jersey Transit
- Platforms: 1 side platform
- Tracks: 1
- Connections: NJT Bus: 76, 712, and 780

Construction
- Parking: 221 spaces (in 2 lots)
- Cycle facilities: Lockers available
- Accessible: Yes

Other information
- Station code: 769 (Erie Railroad)
- Fare zone: 5

History
- Opened: January 21, 1861
- Rebuilt: 1893

Key dates
- September 1, 1969: Station depot burns
- July 1970: Station depot razed

Passengers
- 2025: 200 (average weekday)
- Rank: 102 of 153

Services
Preceding station	NJ Transit	Following station
Anderson Street toward Spring Valley	Pascack Valley Line	Teterboro toward Hoboken
Former services
Preceding station	Erie Railroad	Following station
Central Avenue toward Haverstraw	New Jersey and New York Railroad	Williams Avenue toward Jersey City
Location

Essex Street station is an active commuter railroad station in the city of Hackensack, Bergen County, New Jersey. Located at the junction of the eponymous Essex Street (County Route 56) and Railroad Avenue, the station serves trains of NJ Transit's Pascack Valley Line between Hoboken Terminal and Spring Valley, New York. It is one of two active stations in Hackensack, with the station at Anderson Street at the other end of Railroad Avenue. Essex Street station serves as a park and ride, with a 221-space parking lot west of the single side platform. The platform is low-level except for a single section for those with disabilities.

Essex Street station, originally named Hackensack, marked the original terminus of the Hackensack and New York Railroad, a small branch line off the Erie Railroad from Rutherford to Hackensack. Service at the station began on January 21, 1861. The station served as the northern end of the line until September 9, 1869, when service was extended north to Anderson Street. After the railroad went into receivership in 1878, it became part of the New Jersey and New York Railroad, operated by the Erie after 1896. During Erie operation, the station served as one of four stops in Hackensack, with stations also operated at Central Avenue and Fairmount Avenue.

The station depot at Hackensack station burned on September 1, 1969 and after litigation to save the structure, the railroad razed the building on July 1970.

== History ==
=== Hackensack and New York Railroad ===
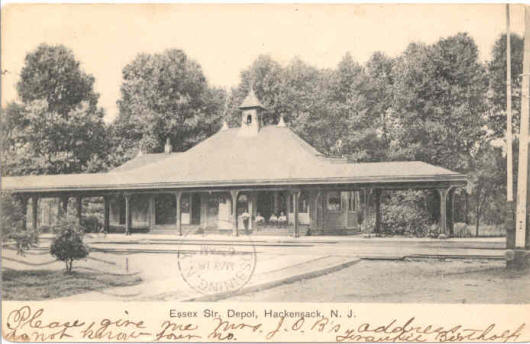
The former Hackensack depot in 1907

The original alignment of the Essex Street station dates back to the chartering of the Hackensack and New York Railroad in 1856 by David P. Patterson and other investors. Their intent in creating the rail line was to help maintain a steam-powered train line in the Pascack Valley and have future ambitions to build the system northward. Construction on the new 21-mile (34 km) long line began in 1859, with trains heading from New York City to the Passaic Street station in Hackensack. Although Hackensack was not a large hub, there were several rail lines serving the city, including the New Jersey Midland Line (now the New York, Susquehanna and Western Railroad) with stops at Main Street (at the Mercer Street intersection) and at Prospect Avenue. During the 1860s, service was extended to north, terminating at the new Essex Street station. Although most Hackensack and New York trains ended at Passaic Street, service was extended northward on September 5, 1869, when that stop was abandoned in replacement for three brand new stops: Anderson Street, Fairmount Avenue and Central Avenue. By 1870, the tracks had been extended northward to Hillsdale, and public service began on the line on March 4 of that year. Trains terminated at Hillsdale with fare of only $0.75 (1870 USD), but just one year later, the service was extended northward to the community of Haverstraw, New York, and in 1896, the rail line was leased by the private company to the Erie Railroad.

=== Station fire and demolition (1969–1970) ===
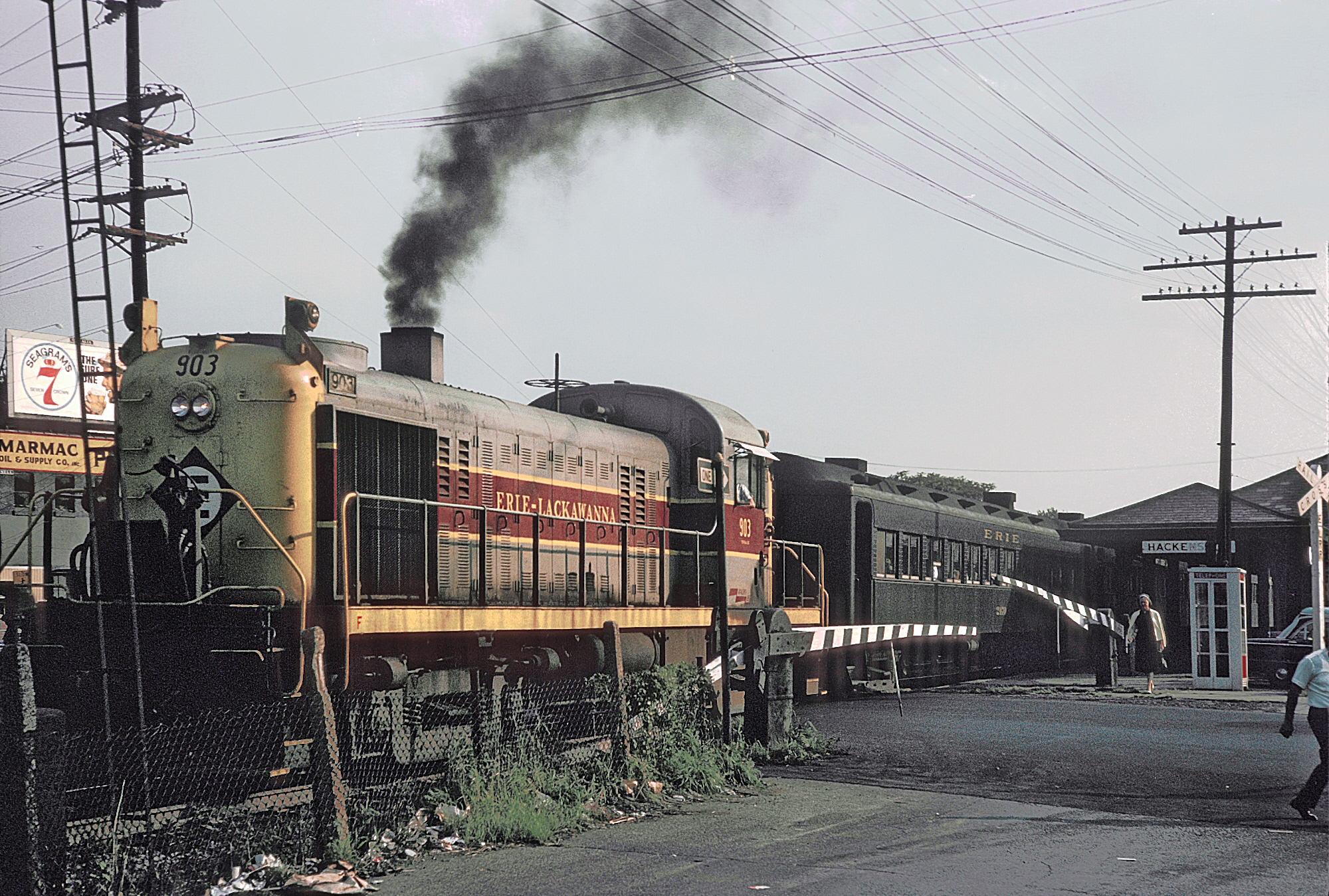
An Erie-Lackawanna train leaving Hackensack station on September 3, 1965

The station depot at Essex Street caught fire on the afternoon of September 1, 1969. Despite a quick response and elimination of the fire, the station depot suffered severe structural damage to the south end of the structure. The northern end of the structure was still in operation. Local officials stated that loiterers in the station started the fire but that had made no arrests at that point. The station depot was condemned by officials.

The Erie Lackawanna Railroad approached the Board of Public Utility Commissioners in October 1969 to have the station depot eliminated and the position of an agent at Hackensack station eliminated. Railroad officials stated that they did not see it financially plausible to rebuild the burned station depot and that all freight agent service was being dealt with at the Woodridge–Moonachie station. The city of Hackensack filed a formal opposition to the case, with a unanimous vote by the City Council on a resolution. Their opposition felt that the lack of a station depot would produce a hardship for local residents and local businesses who used the station. They also stated that City Manager Joseph Squillace would be present at the meeting to make their case.

The hearing was held in Newark on October 22, with the railroad defending their position that they could not afford to repair the station due to lack of insurance on the structure. Frank Tilley Jr., chairman of the Bergen County Public Transportation Board, stated that the Commuter Operating Agency, a branch of the New Jersey Department of Transportation (NJDOT) stated that they felt the station could be repaired. Tilley added that the funds for a rebuild would come from a bond issue for transportation approved by voters in 1968. Squillace reiterated the city's position, but added that if the depot were to be demolished, the railroad should be required to put up shelter for riders. Tilley backed their position on the shelter. The railroad also told the Commissioners that the only freight business operated at Hackensack station was done by phone and Woodridge–Moonachie handled all the business.

The Commissioners announced their decision in December 1969, giving the railroad permission to demolish the depot and that it would be replaced by a shelter for riders. The demolition occurred in July 1970.

== Station layout ==
Essex Street station is located at the intersection of Essex Street, Railroad Avenue and John Street in the city of Hackensack. The station has a lone side platform on the southbound side for the one active track heading through the station. There are two parking lots on either side of the station, with a large 188-space station on Essex Street behind the platform maintained by Park America that is free on weekends and charges during the week. The second platform is opposite of the tracks, containing 33 spaces and serves as permit parking during week, along with free weekend parking. The station contains a bicycle locker setup and a ticket vending machine located in the shelter on the platform.

Essex Street is located in fare zone 5 along with Anderson Street station. It is served by three buses: the 76, 712, and 780.
