= Anderson Street station =

NJ Transit rail station

Anderson St.
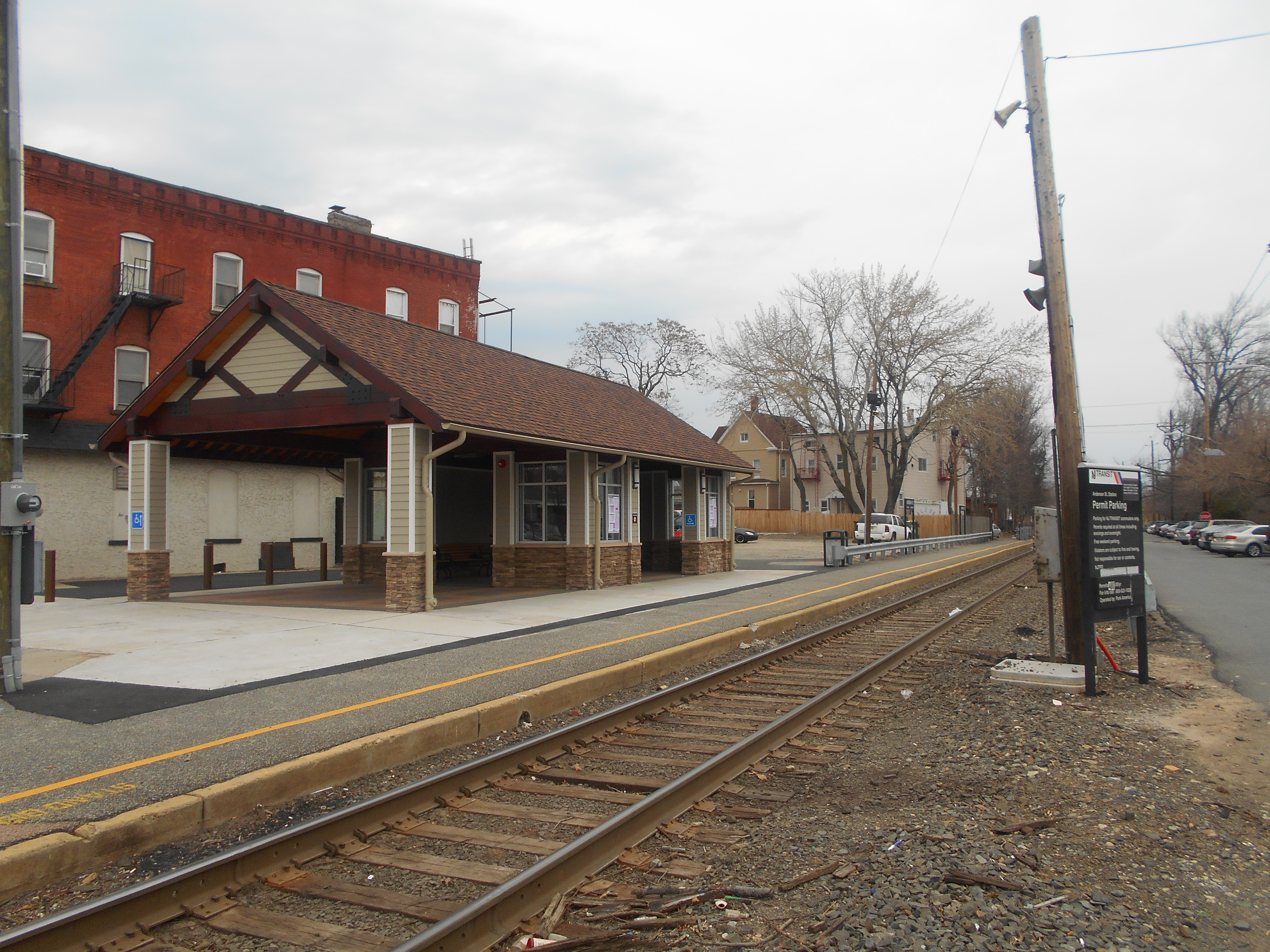
- Anderson Street station in April 2014, after completion of the new shelter that replaced the old 1869 station depot.

General information
- Location: Anderson Street at Railroad Avenue (1 block east of Linden Avenue); Hackensack, New Jersey
- Owner: New Jersey Transit
- Platforms: 1 side platform
- Tracks: 1 (formerly 2)
- Connections: NJ Transit Bus: 175, 770

Construction
- Parking: 52 spaces (along Railroad Avenue)
- Cycle facilities: Lockers available

Other information
- Station code: 769 (Erie Railroad)
- Fare zone: 5

History
- Opened: September 7, 1869 (157 years ago)

Key dates
- January 10, 2009: Station depot burned

Passengers
- 2025: 236 (average weekday)
- Rank: 94 of 153

Services
Preceding station	NJ Transit	Following station
New Bridge Landing toward Spring Valley	Pascack Valley Line	Essex Street toward Hoboken
Former services
Preceding station	NJ Transit	Following station
Fairmount Avenue (closed 1983) toward Spring Valley	Pascack Valley Line	Essex Street toward Hoboken
Preceding station	Erie Railroad	Following station
Fairmount Avenue toward Haverstraw	New Jersey and New York Railroad	Central Avenue toward Jersey City
- Anderson Street Station
- Formerly listed on the U.S. National Register of Historic Places
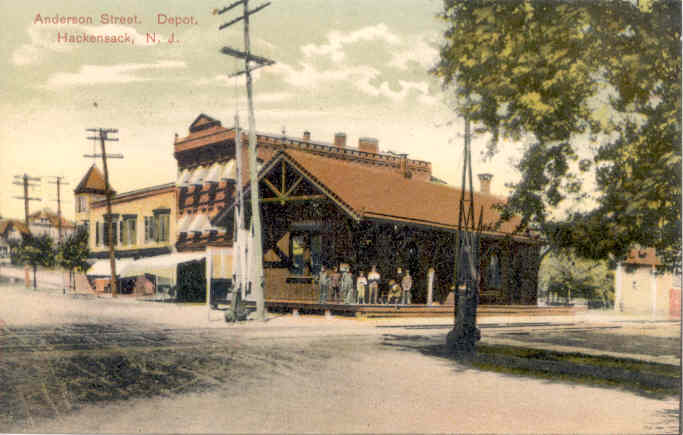
- Anderson Street station in 1910 looking to the northwest.
- Location: Anderson Street, Hackensack, New Jersey
- Coordinates: 40°53′39″N 74°02′40″W
- Area: 0.3 acres (0.1 ha)
- Built: 1869
- Architectural style: Carpenter Gothic
- MPS: Operating Passenger Railroad Stations TR
- NRHP reference No.: 84002520

Significant dates
- Added to NRHP: June 22, 1984
- Removed from NRHP: May 18, 2011
Location

Anderson Street station is an active commuter railroad station in the city of Hackensack, Bergen County, New Jersey. Located at the junction of the eponymous Anderson Street and Railroad Avenue, the station services trains of NJ Transit's Pascack Valley Line between Spring Valley station in Spring Valley, New York and Hoboken Terminal in Hoboken, New Jersey. Anderson Street is the northern of two stations in Hackensack, the other being Essex Street station several blocks south. The station consists of a low-level side platform and a large station shelter to facilitate coverage for passengers. Anderson Street station has a 50-space parking lot on Railroad Avenue.

Anderson Street station opened on September 7, 1869 when service on the Hackensack and New York Railroad was extended north from the Passaic Street station in Hackensack, which opened in 1866. Railroad service ended at Anderson Street until March 4, 1870, when service was extended to Hillsdale. At the time of opening, the railroad built a wooden-frame station depot on Anderson Street to service customers. The station depot would become the home of the Green Caboose, a thrift shop that opened in May 1966 to fund the Hackensack Hospital School of Nursing. Anderson Street station would be added to the National Register of Historic Places in 1984.

On the morning of January 10, 2009, the station depot caught fire at 5:55 a.m. and the fire reached two nearby propane tanks, resulting in an explosion, which leveled the station depot. The Green Caboose's belongings were destroyed in the fire. After the fire, the Anderson Street station was removed from the National Register on May 18, 2011.

== History ==
=== Construction and opening (1860–1871) ===
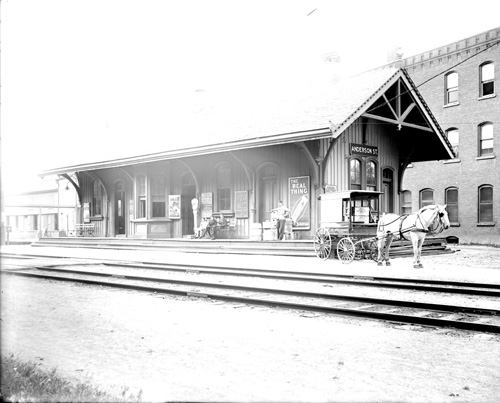
Anderson Street station in 1909

The construction of a railroad through Hackensack came through the charter of the Hackensack and New York Railroad Company in 1856. This new railroad would connect Hackensack to the Paterson and Hudson River Railroad, which had become part of the Erie Railroad. With the charter, they built a railroad to the current-day Essex Street station, which opened on January 21, 1861. On March 12, 1861, a supplemental addition to the charter allowed for an extension of the railroad to Nanuet, New York, where it would meet with the former Erie Railroad main line. In 1861, the line was extended north to Passaic Street, a block south of Anderson Street and by 1867, the right-of-way was established for an extension to New Bridge.

The final construction contracts were released on February 28, 1869 for extension of the railroad under the charter of the Hackensack and New York Railroad Extension Company. This company would be the one to complete the route to Nanuet. Under the charter, the work would have to be finished to the New York state line by October 1869 with remaining work to be finished by January 1, 1870. Construction was under way by April 1869, construction began on the depot at Anderson Street. Funded on money from the Erie Railroad and local residents, the new station depot was built on the design of the station at Passaic, New Jersey. With dimensions of 70 by 35 feet (21 m × 11 m), the wooden station cost about $6,000 (1869 USD). The Anderson Street station would replace the Passaic Street station when it opened on September 7, 1869. An opening ceremony was held for Anderson Street station that day with Garrett Ackerson of the Erie Railroad, the former president of the Hackensack and New York Railroad and other high-profile attendees, including multiple locals. After the opening ceremony, the party of high-profile guests had a meal and drove around the city of Hackensack.

Anderson Street station would serve as the northern terminus of the line until March 4, 1870, when service was extended to Hillsdale. The line would reach Nanuet on May 27, 1871.

=== Demands for replacement (1913–1919) ===
The decrepit condition of the Anderson Street station became a public nuisance to Hackensack residents in the autumn of 1913. A petition of 600 signatures would be brought to a meeting to discuss the station's future on September 8, 1913. This petition would be to demand the Erie Railroad build a new station at Anderson Street. The meeting, held at the State Street School House, would be attended by federal and municipal officials. Complaints were plenty at the night meeting. Archibald C. Hart, the 6th congressional district representative in the United States House of Representatives, attended, calling the station unsanitary and filthy. Hart also commended people for standing up for a new station to represent the city and said that the only way to get the railroad to budge was to demand action on their grounds. Hart also added that the new station should not be built at Anderson Street, but a block north at Maple Avenue. A local who visited railroad stations in Southern California added that the railroads helped the communities, claiming the Erie had not done anything with Hackensack. Another added that the station depot was a liability to the railroad rather than a useful asset, despite its design. Colonel Alfred T. Holley, one of ten people assigned to a new committee to determine the future of Anderson Street station, added that a new meeting should be held with Erie Railroad officials present. The petition submitted was read and adopted as an official resolution on a unanimous vote.

The petition stated that they wanted a new railroad station built at Anderson Street of modern design and consistent with artistic structure. The petition added that the new station would be inadequate to accommodating growing railroad passenger traffic in the area and that a fare raise in 1911 should have been enough to get improvements or a new station built at Anderson Street station. Instead, the resolution claims, the Erie Railroad let the station deteriorate in that time span.

The condition of the Anderson Street station became a focal point of the Hackensack Improvement Commission elections in 1913. The Third Ward Progressive candidate, Abram Howard, stated at a rally on September 22 at Clay Street and Railroad Avenue that the Hackensack Improvement Commission should be the ones who focused on action in terms of pressuring the Erie Railroad. The rally, held to drum up support for Edmund B. Osborne on the Progressive ticket for Governor of New Jersey, had Howard speak that the new station would not be tolerated by citizens of Hackensack, and that more trains should stop at the Central Avenue depot, one stop south of Anderson Street. Rumors broke that the Erie Railroad was considering painting and patching the decrepit depot instead of building a new station broke by October 1, 1913. Adolph Winkler, the Progressive nominee for the Commissioner at-large job, stated that the railroad deciding to turn down the request was a bad decision. He added that the Public Utility Commissioners had just forced the Erie Railroad to build a new station at Haskell in Passaic County and felt that it was weird Haskell would get favor and not Hackensack. He added that he would force action to get the railroad to build the new station and maintain it under state codes. In communication in late 1913 to each other, Winkler and Democratic nominee George Collins stated that they were both in agreement about the Anderson Street depot. Collins added that he signed the petition in September 1913 and that he would force action through the Public Utilities Commission.

The railroad responded to a letter sent by E.B. Walden of Hackensack asking about the status of the depot in early November 1913. The railroad's superintendent stated that there plans for new waiting rooms and toilets at the station, along with a new platform and a modern heating system. They would also work on improving the station depot on the outside and inside. The superintendent felt that these plans would be met with approval by government, but stated that the railroad's financial condition would make it impossible to build a new station depot at Anderson Street.

Official designs were brought to W.A. Irwin's store at 126 Anderson Street in January 1914, next to the depot, to be shown to the public. The Erie Railroad's proposal would involve extending the depot 6 feet (1.8 m), adding a 12-foot (3.7 m) overhang on the front of the station. This new overhang would be supported by new pillars. Tiles would be placed on the roof of the enlarged depot, which would also feature stucco in its side walls. The waiting rooms for men and women would be flipped as well. The proposed modern heating system, fueled by steam, was already installed by that point and other changes to the interior of the depot were under way. These renovations were protested by the Progressive Party, who considered that the railroad was doing nothing that the commuters wanted. At least one member stated that the committee was non-partisan, so it was a mistake to inject partisan politics into the discussion about the Erie Railroad's response.

Despite the railroad's offered improvements, the committee looking into construction of a new station at Anderson Street decided on January 16 that they would take steps to bring their demands to the Public Utility Commission. Based on a conversation with an Erie official, the committee felt that the railroad was doing nothing for the state of New Jersey and just getting higher money from state taxes. The committee was skeptical construction proposed in the designs at Irwin's would even be done. Their resolution stated that a copy would be sent to the Erie Railroad and that they would start Public Utility Commission work as soon as possible. The city counsel for Hackensack, Arthur Van Buskirk, stated in March 1914 that they had begun proceedings to file a complaint with the Public Utility Commission. He took a tour of the Anderson Street depot with the Commissioner's inspector and hinted that the station needed work. The inspector suggested that a shelter be looked at for the eastern side of the tracks. While the inspector stated that there would be no deadline on any construction, he would try to have a report ready for Van Buskirk two weeks after inspection.

The report would be submitted to Van Buskirk on March 2, 1914. McKelvey also submitted the report to the railroad, which responded on March 16, stating that they would not make any improvements beyond what was necessary to keep the station clean and maintained. They felt that the financial revenue at Anderson Street station would not justify the construction of a new station and wanted a deferral on improvements until it was feasible. In January 1915, the Public Utility Commissioners stated that they would continue to press the railroad on their decision making in leaving Anderson Street station in bad shape. They added that if necessary, a hearing would be held to determine the railroad's level of responsibility in upkeep and maintenance. McKelvey returned to the station on January 1 and found the station "clean and sanitary". He added that the case should postponed till May 1 to get the railroad more time to respond. If the railroad would fail to respond, he would ask that the station interior receive a new coat of paint and that the platform be upgraded per his report from March 1914.

Progress slowed on getting a new Anderson Street depot. On March 28, 1916, the city's Transportation Committee met with Erie Railroad President Frederick Douglas Underwood to demand a new station for Anderson Street. Underwood, having heard the committee out, agreed that it was time to replace the depot and that new station would be built by a contractor in the city and used materials from Hackensack to help build community development. Despite Underwood's promises, nothing happened by December 1916. Local residents were getting angry, despite the fact that the Erie Railroad stated that if a new station depot were built, it would be moved to the triangle plot Archibald Hart suggested in September 1913 on Maple Avenue at the junction with Linden Street, on the condition the Hackensack Improvement Commission would agree to eliminate the grade crossing at Maple Avenue.

The Community Council Transportation Committee doused the angst flames on December 13. E.B. Walden, the Transportation Committee and other officials were in constant communication with the Erie Railroad and stated that the plans for a new station were drawn. The plans were offered to local contractors in Hackensack who would soon make bids on the project with construction expected to start in the spring of 1917. The Improvement Commission agreed to abandon the piece of Maple Avenue that crossed the railroad tracks at-grade, to which no law was present on how to handle it. They added that politicians in Trenton would have to deal with this in the legislature, where a bill was created by the Improvement Commission's Legislative Committee. In February 1917, legislators and the Transportation Committee confirmed that no legislation was required to close the Maple Avenue grade crossing. The Hackensack Improvement Commission had permission to close the grade crossing at-will to help begin construction of the new $20,000 (1917 USD) station depot. The president of the Hackensack Community Council announced at a banquet in May 1917 that a new station was inevitable after facing the legal challenges.

Progress on the new Anderson Street station hit a block in early July 1917. The Hackensack Improvement Commission offered an ordinance to make an agreement with the railroad build the new station at Maple Avenue. However, on the second reading, a remonstrance was offered from property owners on Maple Avenue who opposed the elimination of the grade crossing. They felt that the elimination of the grade crossing would be dangerous for firefighters and reduce the monetary value of their properties. They also protested the construction of a new one-way roadway along the tracks that the railroad themselves would maintain. The mayor of Hackensack suggested that the ordinance be deferred until July 16 to discuss the concerns of the property owners. At the meeting on July 16, the protesting property owners withdrew their remonstrance to the grade crossing elimination and when the ordinance was read again, no objections were placed. The motion passed unanimously to vociferous applause in the large audience and was placed in effect as of August 1.

Despite the victory, progress halted again on the new station. By June 1918, frustration from the Community council showed in a letter to the Erie Railroad. The railroad stated that after coming close to finishing the station at Leonia on the Northern Branch, the United States Government requested that the company desist from further building construction due to World War I. They added that there was no practiced discrimination against the city, but that their hands were tied.

In September 1919, the Erie Railroad sent a crew out to the Anderson Street station to repaint the depot into a new shade of dark green. This decision was looked at by locals as a sign that the new depot at Maple Avenue was postponed despite the end of the war.

=== Green Caboose Thrift Shop, historic status and community development (1966–1998) ===
In 1965, plans were discussed for a thrift shop for the Hackensack Hospital School of Nursing by the Women's Auxiliary and Nurses' Alumnae Association. With money given by the Auxiliary, the groups purchased the Anderson Street station from the Erie Lackawanna Railroad. With the station depot in their possession, they renovated the building, including eliminating the gray paint job on the outside to green. The inside would become yellow with paint donated by contributors to the project, replacing a paint job from 1954. Fluorescent lighting was put in the station depot. The ticket office at the station became the room for marking prices on donated clothing and other objects offered for sale. The cash register, fixtures and renovation work were all done on a donation status as well. On the morning of May 16, 1966, the station depot opened for business as the Green Caboose. Within 18 months, the thrift shop at Anderson Street had raised $10,000 (1967 USD) for the nursing school.

In January 1983, the New Jersey Review Board for Historical Sites recommended that the Anderson Street station along with other train stations now under the purview of NJ Transit be added to the New Jersey and National Register of Historic Places. The added designation would ensure that the station depot could be demolished or altered without approval of various state and municipal organizations. In the nomination, the Anderson Street station was considered as an unaltered example of suburban railroad architecture. With the minimalist design, the station's Carpenter Gothic architecture reflected historical designs, including the board siding with battens. On March 17, 1984, the station depot was added to the New Jersey State Register and on June 22, the same was done with the National Register. In May 1985, NJ Transit won an award from the National Trust for Historic Preservation for the addition of the stations to the National Register.

Anderson Street station became a focus in August 1994 with the neighborhood businesses. Seeing the financial depression along Main Street in Hackensack, over 45 owners of businesses near Anderson Street worked at trying to prevent the neighborhood from suffering similar issues. As part of a group called the Linden and Anderson Merchants Association, they looked at local urban planning to invigorate Anderson Street businesses. The station depot would be in the area of the Anderson–Linden Historic Village, a neighborhood that would get $335,000 in federal grant money to improve the area. New curbs, fresh road pavement and upgrades to Anderson Street Park would be done, according to a 1992 architectural study. NJ Transit also added plans for $90,000 in improvements to Anderson Street station, along with the possibility installing a town clock at the station. The renovated Anderson Street Park opened in May 1996, where it was announced that renovations would be coming to the Anderson Street station.

In January 1998, the Hackensack City Council offered two bond ordinances that totaled $819,000 for multiple projects. $100,000 of the money would go for the renovations at Anderson Street station. When the original plans were designed in 1993, the costs would have been $490,000. In 1996, they added another $50,000 for the project and with the updated bonds, would total $640,000 for the project. The New Jersey Department of Transportation would reimburse $75,000 of the new $100,000 as part of a grant. The new bonds were approved on January 20. NJ Transit offered the contract for the renovations and construction was underway by August 1998. NJ Transit's work including removing the lead paint on the outside of the station depot, adding benches, new trash receptacles, signage, along with installing air conditioning in the waiting room. However, delays were incurred because NJ Transit offered the contract to the second-lowest bidder on the project rather than the lowest bidder, resulting in protest.

The station restoration was complete by December 1998. Mayor John Zisa of Hackensack added that the station renovations included bringing it back to its 1869 paint color with mustard and Tudor-style brown. The asphalt roof was replaced with a slate roof. The doors and windows were replaced along with the hardwood benches installed. The clock tower proposed in 1994 was installed as well.

=== Station fire and replacement (2009–2014) ===
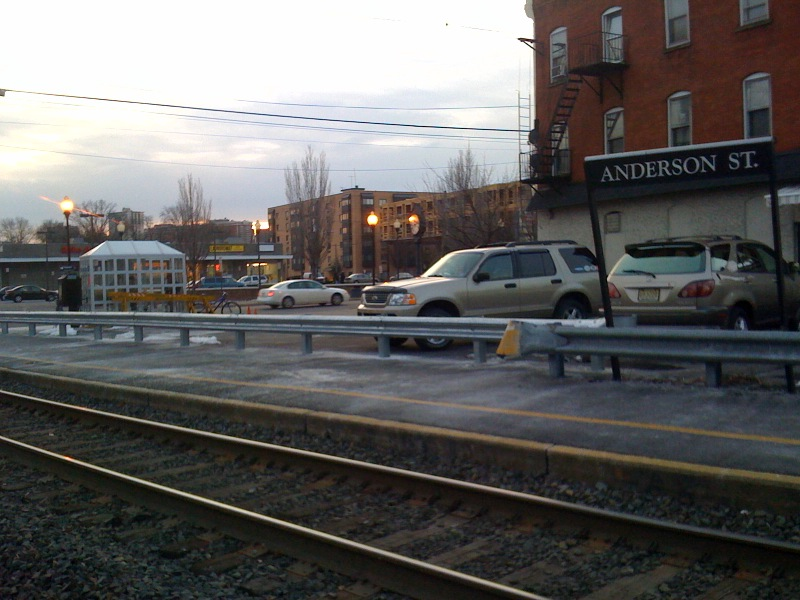
Anderson Street station, one year after the station depot burned

On the morning of January 10, 2009, the station depot at Anderson Street caught fire. The Hackensack Fire Department was alerted to the fire at 5:55 a.m., where it was fully involved. The fire spread to two propane tanks installed in the depot, which exploded along with new passenger vehicles parked next to the station depot. Firefighters from neighboring municipalities Ridgefield Park, South Hackensack, Bogota and Teaneck responded to extra alarms. Hackensack fire officials evacuated the apartment complex next to Anderson Street station, which would suffer from broken windows due to the explosions. Due to the fire, service on the Pascack Valley Line had to be suspended until it was safe for trains to clear the area. The Anderson Street station was deemed a total loss and a safety riisk, resulting in part of the station depot being demolished in order to allow train service. Service was restored around 6:30 p.m. on January 10.

Due to the explosion, all the wares of the Green Caboose Thrift Shop in the depot were destroyed. The thrift shop, regularly making $40,000 a year for Hackensack University Medical Center, announced that they would have new clothing donations ready quickly with some of their extra wares in storage and that a new location would be found for the thrift shop volunteers. The President of the Women's Auxiliary, Peggy Liosi, went to the fire at 6:00 a.m. on January 10 and started crying hysterically while watching the depot and thrift shop burn. The Green Caboose did not pay rent for the Anderson Street station, but did pay for utilities and stated that finding a new location with such a bargain deal would be a challenge. They stated they were looking in the same section of Hackensack. The Green Caboose relocated to a location at 86 Orchard Street by 2010.

Demolition was finished by January 12, with NJ Transit having the station debris removed from the property. NJ Transit installed a bus shelter to help the passengers at Anderson Street station.

In February 2011, the New Jersey State Review Board of Historic Sites was asked to remove the station from the New Jersey and National Register of Historic Places due to the fire in January 2009. The request, made by NJ Transit, was offered because nothing remains from a historical perspective of the 1869 station depot. Daniel Saunders, the acting Administrator of the New Jersey Historic Preservation Office agreed with the decision to remove the station from the historic list. However, officials from Hackensack opposed the motion, stating that they wanted instead to build a replica of the depot. Hackensack Mayor Karen Sasso stated that they asked NJ Transit to rebuild the station depot and eliminate the bus shelter, but stated that the agency had been unresponsive. NJ Transit stated that they were making plans for the Anderson Street station, but added that no plans were public on what would be built or how it would be built.

The State Review Board for Historic Sites held a hearing on February 24 in Trenton. Albert Dib, the city historian, stated that if they removed the register status, NJ Transit would be allowed to build whatever they wanted to on the station site. His argument was not taken seriously by the Board, stating that a replica would not be considered historical. The board voted for the removal, which would be moved to the Amy Cradic, the Assistant New Jersey Department of Environmental Protection Commission for Natural and Historical Resources to make the final determination. After the vote, they did a second vote to send a letter to NJ Transit to design something to fit in with the historic district designated by Hackensack along Anderson Street. NJ Transit added that they would reach out to officials in Hackensack for their opinion on their plans for the station site. Cradic removed the status in April 2011. The station was removed from the National Register of Historic Places on May 18, 2011.

In March 2012, college students from the New Jersey Institute of Technology (NJIT) met with local residents and officials, along with business owners at the Hackensack Civic Center to work on redeveloping the Anderson Street and Essex Street stations along with the River Street bus station. Through a grant, they were asked to design transit-oriented development and offered the 25 attendees to look at the maps of Hackensack and detailed the assets and liabilities of each area. At Anderson Street station, the college students offered that building residential complexes near the station would boost ridership and open more room for commercial development. The NJIT students proposed their design in a presentation in May 2012. Along with the transit-oriented development at Essex Street and Anderson Street, they suggested that building a new park along the Hackensack River and moving the core of the city in attachment with it, would help grow the city.

In late March 2013, NJ Transit announced that they had begun construction of a new station depot at Anderson Street. A groundbreaking ceremony was held on March 29, where it was explained that the station would not be an exact replica of the burned 1869 station. The new station depot would be built with a stonework base façade, along with walls built through cement board meant to be a facsimile of wood. The new structure would also have a 46-by-20-foot (14.0 m × 6.1 m) waiting room, the exact measurements of the waiting room in the original depot. The roof of the structure would be made with shingles. New benches would be built in the waiting room along with new ticket vending machines. The new station was expected to cost $571,000.

== Station layout and services ==
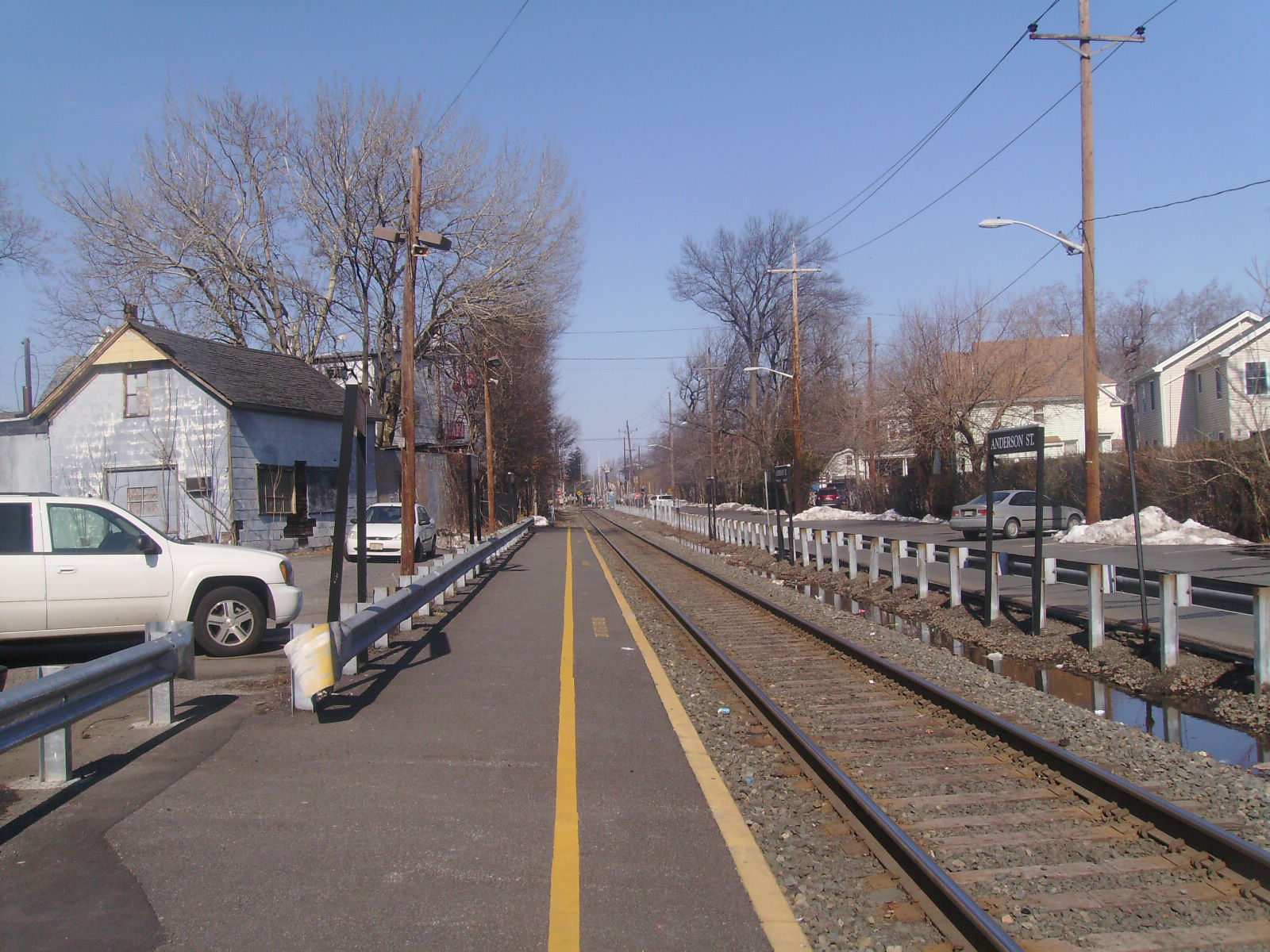
Anderson Street station facing Spring Valley-bound (northbound) in Hackensack prior to reconstruction

The Anderson Street station is located at the junction of Anderson Street and Railroad Avenue, a block east of Linden Avenue in Hackensack. The station consists of a single low-level side platform with no handicap accessibility alongside the one track of the Pascack Valley Line. The station features a single ticket vending machine in the shelter. Park America operates the station's 52-space parking lot under contract with NJ Transit on a permit basis on weekdays, with two spaces available for handicapped persons. The parking lot runs along Railroad Avenue, split in two parts by Maple Avenue. NJ Transit's 175 bus between Ridgewood, New Jersey and George Washington Bridge Bus Terminal in Washington Heights, Manhattan rides along Anderson Street and passes the station.

== See also ==
- Operating Passenger Railroad Stations Thematic Resource (New Jersey)
- National Register of Historic Places listings in Bergen County, New Jersey

== Bibliography ==
- Tompkins, Leslie Jay (1908). A Selection of Cases on the Law of Private Corporations. New York, New York: Baker, Voorhis and Company.
