= Natirar =

New Jersey estate and park

Coordinates: 40.69763°N 74.65302°W

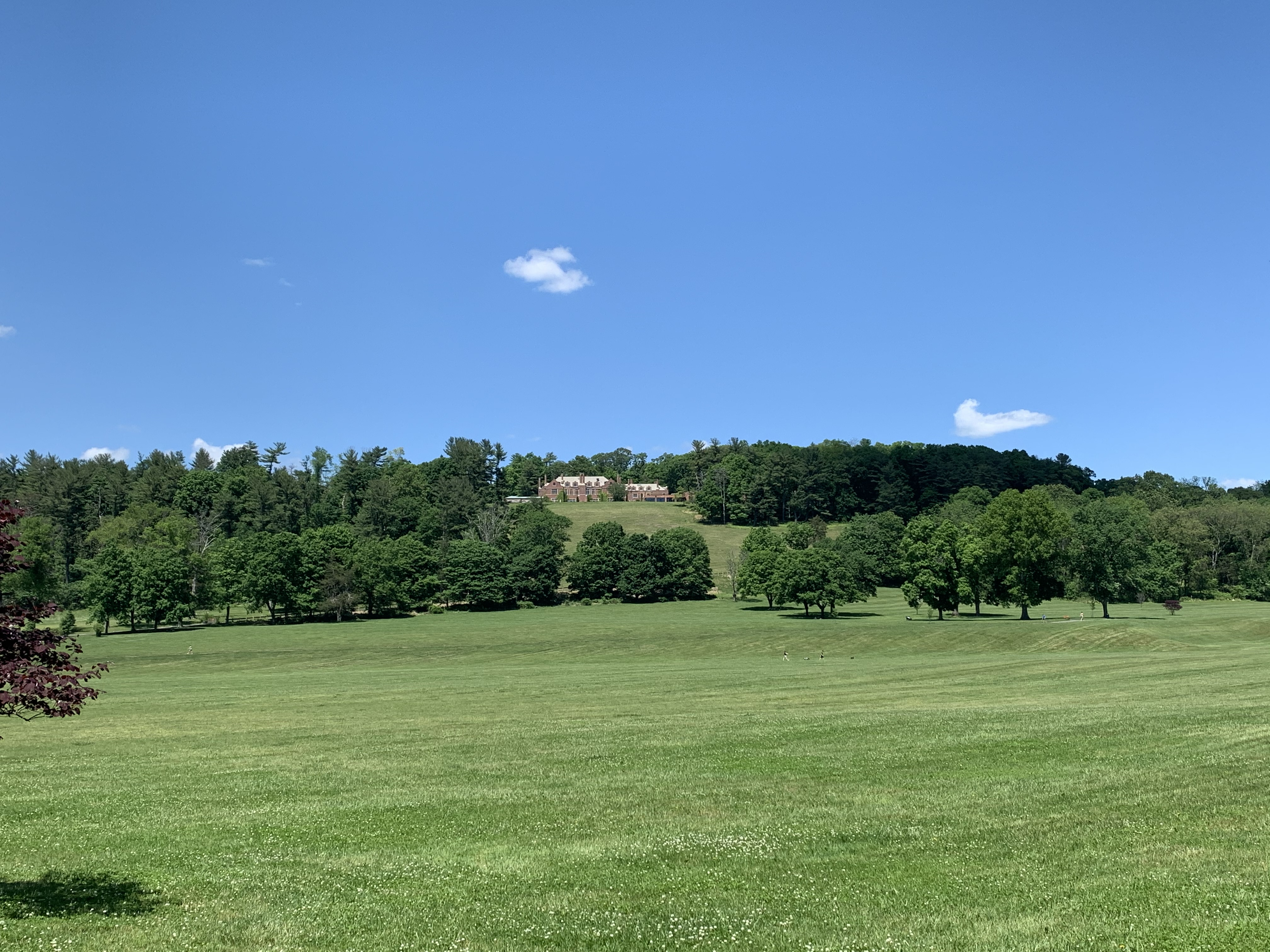
Natirar estate and park (2020)

Natirar is an estate spanning 491 acres (1.99 km^{2}) in Peapack-Gladstone, Far Hills and Bedminster, in Somerset County, New Jersey, United States. Its name is a reverse spelling of Raritan. The complex was built between 1905 and 1912, when the main residence was completed. In 2003 it was sold by the estate of Hassan II, late King of Morocco, to Somerset County, New Jersey, and is now administered by the Somerset County Park Commission. Approximately 90 acres (360,000 m^{2}) of the estate have been leased to develop that portion of the estate (which includes the mansion, stable/carriage barn and most of the other outbuildings) into an exclusive hotel, spa, restaurant complex.

== Location ==
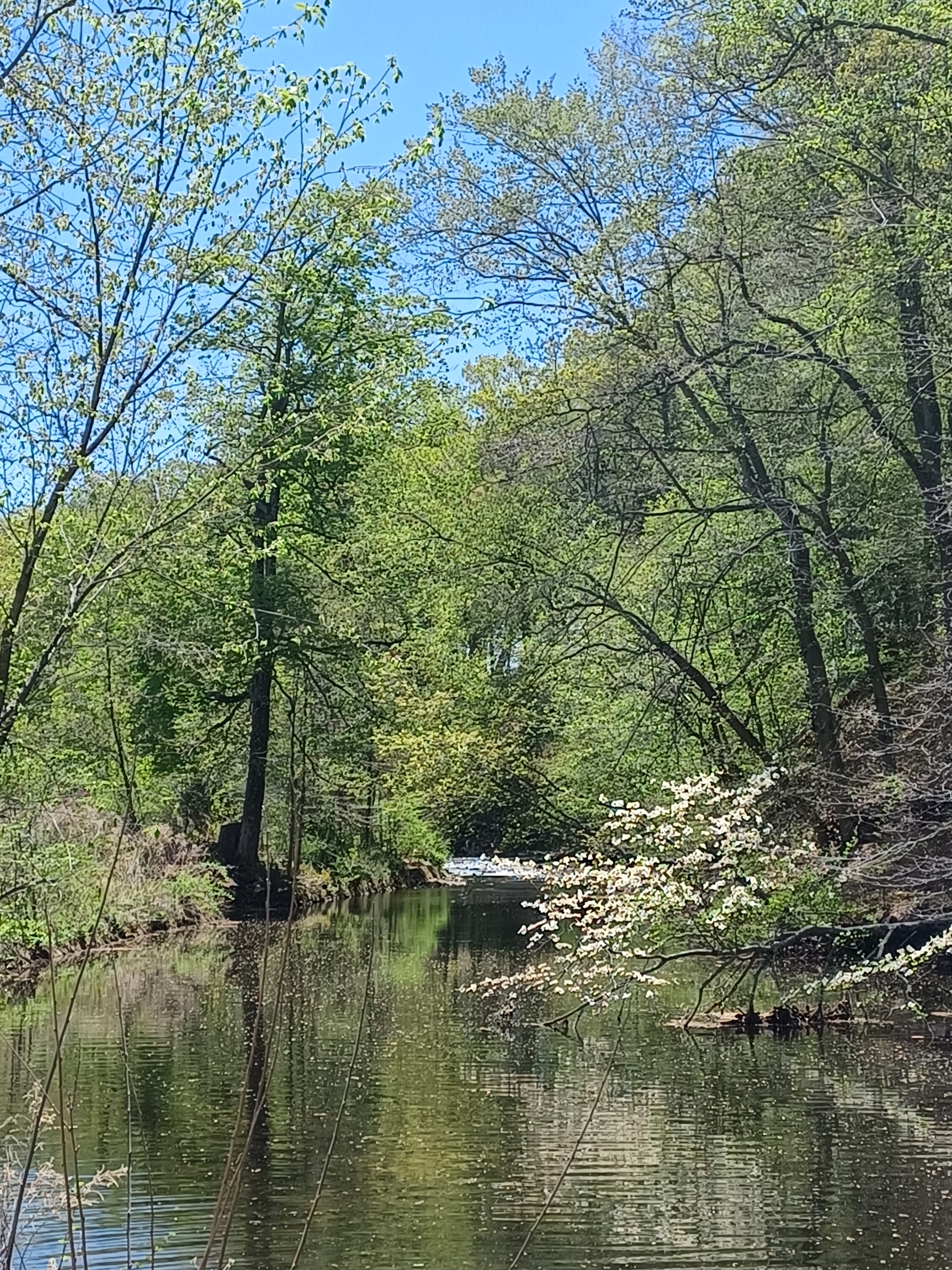
North Branch of Raritan River at Natirar

The 1.25-mile (2.01 km) driveway lies within the 491-acre (1.99 km^{2}) estate that occupies portions of three municipalities. The main buildings and 327 acres (1.32 km^{2}) are in the Borough of Peapack-Gladstone, 124 acres (0.50 km^{2}) are in the Borough of Far Hills, and 40 acres (160,000 m^{2}) are in Bedminster Township. The core buildings are south of Highland Avenue, east of Main Street/Peapack Road, north of the North Branch of the Raritan River and west of Lake Road. The main entrance, once at the Far Hills train station, is now just over the town line, nearly at the spot where Main Street (Peapack Road) crosses the North Branch of the Raritan River and New Jersey Transit's Gladstone Branch.

== Uses ==
Natirar was originally an estate for Kate Macy Ladd (1863–1945), heiress to a Massachusetts whaling, shipping and oil fortune, and her husband, Walter Graeme Ladd (1857–1933). Beginning in 1908, Mrs. Ladd provided a convalescent facility at “Maple Cottage,” a large residence on the estate, where “deserving gentlewomen who are compelled to depend on their own exertions for support shall be entertained, without charge, for periods of time while convalescing from illness, recuperating from impaired health, or otherwise in need of rest.” Following Mrs. Ladd's death in 1945, title to Natirar was conveyed to the Kate Macy Ladd Fund, and the convalescent facility was relocated from Maple Cottage to the renovated main residence on the estate.

Under the terms of Walter Ladd's will, the estate was to be sold 50 years after his death. Thus, in 1983, the convalescent facility was disbanded, its assets distributed in equal parts to five educational institutions, and the property was sold for $7.5 million to Hassan II, the King of Morocco, who visited the property infrequently due to its use as a permanent residence for his children as they attended Princeton University. After the king's death, ownership passed to his son, King Mohammed VI, who sold the property in 2003 to Somerset County, New Jersey for $22 million.

The county leased 90 acres (360,000 m^{2}) of the property, including all of the core buildings, to a local resident, Bob Wojtowicz. He began plans to renovate the buildings. The carriage house on the property was converted into a restaurant known as 'Ninety Acres', and an attached garage was converted to a cooking school for public classes and events. It opened in late December 2009. Bob had partnered with Richard Branson from Virgin spa to convert the mansion to a resort location. Virgin's branding ended when Miraval Resorts became a partner with Bob Wojtowicz. When the Miraval partnership did not work out, Wojtowisicz worked with Alan Fuerstman from Montage International, founder of the Pendry brand.

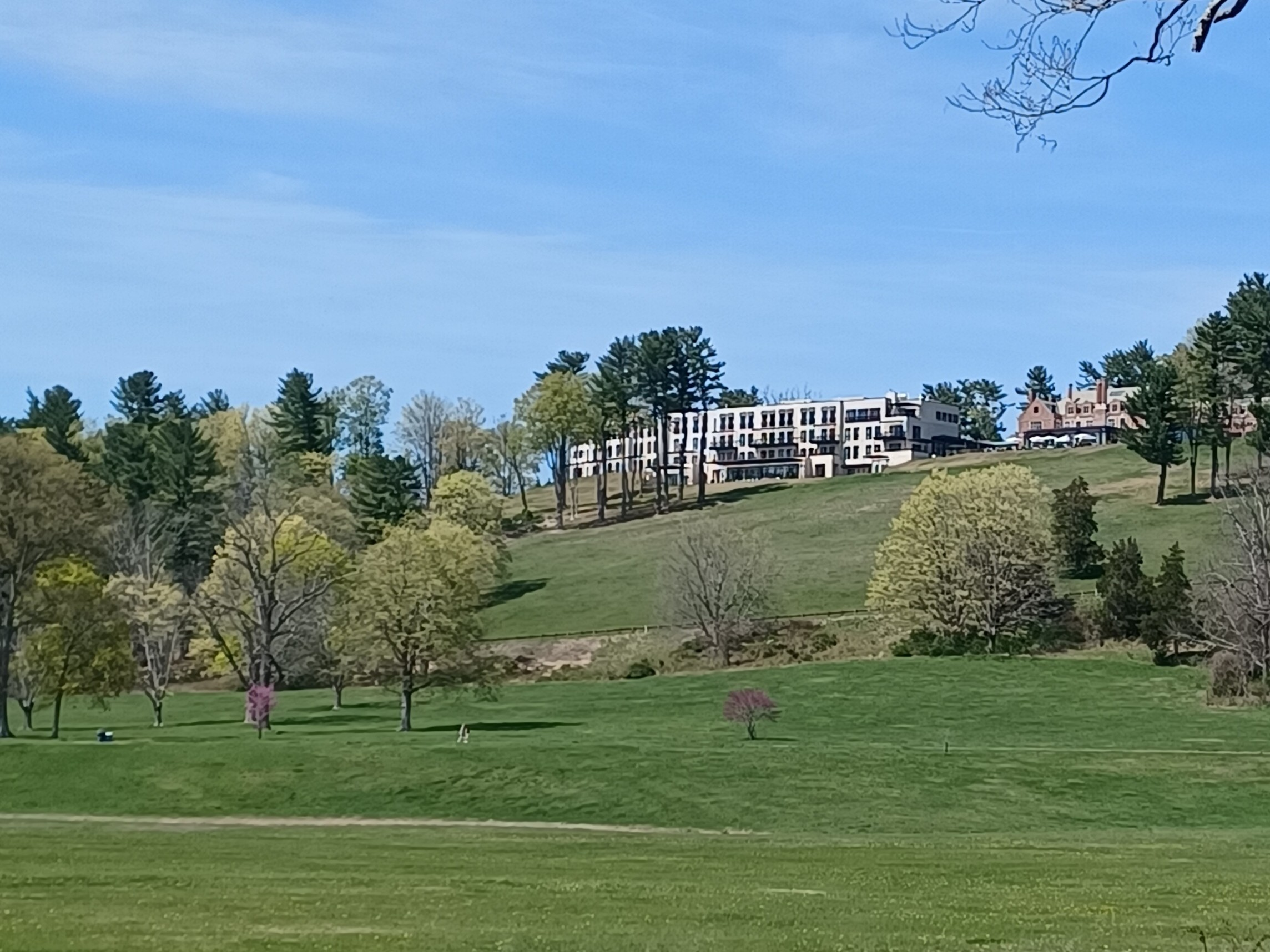
Pendry extension next to the mansion, 2025

In October 2024 Pendry Natirar's hotel and spa was opened next to the original Tudor-style mansion. The hotel is part of Montage International.

== Natirar Park ==
Somerset County operates 404 acres as Natirar, a county park with 247 acres located in Peapack-Gladstone, 124 acres in Far Hills, and 40 acres in Bedminster. The parks features include areas of lawn and woodland, and river access to North Branch Raritan River. Peapack Brook also flows through the property. The park also includes historic farm buildings and other residential structures and out-buildings dating from the mid-18th through mid-19th centuries which are not open to the public.
