= Pendry Hotels and Resorts =

Luxury boutique hotel chain

Pendry Hotels & Resorts
- Type: Privately held company
- Industry: Hospitality
- Founded: 2014
- Founders: Alan Fuerstman, Michael Fuerstman
- Headquarters: Irvine, California, United States
- Area served: North America
- Services: Hotel and resort management
- Parent: Montage International
- Website: www.pendry.com

Pendry Hotels & Resorts is a chain of luxury boutique hotels owned by Montage International. As of 2026 it operates eight properties in the United States.

== History ==
Pendry Hotels & Resorts was founded in 2014 by Alan and Michael Fuerstman as a subsidiary of Montage Hotels & Resorts. Its first hotel was opened in San Diego's Gaslamp Quarter in February 2017, a project that began in 2014. In 2018, it began construction on Pendry Manhattan West, a 21-story hotel located in Manhattan which was completed in 2021. It opened its seventh location in 2022, a 131-room hotel in Washington DC. It added its eighth location in 2024, opening Pendry Natirar in Somerset County, New Jersey. In July 2025, Pendry West Hollywood was de-flagged from Pendry and rebranded as "The Sun Rose West Hollywood".

== Properties ==
Pendry Hotels & Resorts is a chain of luxury boutique hotels. It also has a residential component at various properties, and as of 2022 operated seven properties various locations in the United States. In 2024, Pendry Natirar was added in Peapack-Gladstone, New Jersey.
