= New Milford High School (New Jersey) =

High school in Bergen County, New Jersey, US

Location
- 1 Snyder Circle; New Milford, New Jersey, Bergen County, New Jersey 07646; United States; 40°56′34″N 74°01′23″W

Information
- Type: Public high school
- School district: New Milford School District
- NCES School ID: 341128000624
- Principal: Lou Manuppelli
- Faculty: 46.5 FTEs
- Grades: 9-12
- Enrollment: 584 (as of 2024–25)
- Student to teacher ratio: 12.6:1
- Colors: Green and white
- Athletics conference: North Jersey Interscholastic Conference
- Team name: Knights
- Website: highschool.nmpsd.org

New Milford High School is a four-year comprehensive public high school that serves students in ninth through twelfth grade from New Milford in Bergen County, in the U.S. state of New Jersey, operating as the lone secondary school of the New Milford School District. The school has been accredited by the Middle States Association of Colleges and Schools Commission on Elementary and Secondary Schools since 1964.

As of the 2024–25 school year, the school had an enrollment of 584 students and 46.5 classroom teachers (on an FTE basis), for a student–teacher ratio of 12.6:1. There were 101 students (17.3% of enrollment) eligible for free lunch and 23 (3.9% of students) eligible for reduced-cost lunch.

== Awards, recognition and rankings ==
The school was the 131st-ranked public high school in New Jersey out of 339 schools statewide in New Jersey Monthly magazine's September 2014 cover story on the state's "Top Public High Schools", using a new ranking methodology. The school had been ranked 169th in the state of 328 schools in 2012, after being ranked 161st in 2010 out of 322 schools listed. The magazine ranked the school 99th in 2008 out of 316 schools. The school was ranked 86th in the magazine's September 2006 issue, which surveyed 316 schools across the state.

Schooldigger.com ranked the school 132nd out of 381 public high schools statewide in its 2011 rankings (an increase of 55 positions from the 2010 ranking) which were based on the combined percentage of students classified as proficient or above proficient on the mathematics (83.3%) and language arts literacy (95.9%) components of the High School Proficiency Assessment (HSPA).

In its 2013 report on "America's Best High Schools", The Daily Beast ranked the school 1028th in the nation among participating public high schools and 72nd among schools in New Jersey.

== Athletics ==
The New Milford High School Knights participate in the Patriot Division of the North Jersey Interscholastic Conference, which is comprised of small-enrollment schools in Bergen, Hudson, Morris and Passaic counties, and was created following a reorganization of sports leagues in Northern New Jersey by the New Jersey State Interscholastic Athletic Association (NJSIAA). Prior to realignment that took effect in the fall of 2010, New Milford was a member of the Bergen County Scholastic League (BCSL) in the Olympic Division. With 433 students in grades 10-12, the school was classified by the NJSIAA for the 2019–20 school year as Group I for most athletic competition purposes, which included schools with an enrollment of 75 to 476 students in that grade range. The school was classified by the NJSIAA as Group I North for football for 2024–2026, which included schools with 254 to 474 students. The Knights have won multiple league championships in bowling, football, basketball, and wrestling, as well as soccer.

The school participates as the host school / lead agency for joint boys / girls swimming teams with Dumont High School. New Milford and Northern Valley Regional High School at Demarest participate in a co-op ice hockey team with Northern Valley Regional High School at Old Tappan as the host school. These co-op programs operate under agreements scheduled to expire at the end of the 2023–24 school year.

The boys' track team won the indoor track Group III state championship in 1968.

The boys' track team won the Group III spring / outdoor track state championship in 1968.

The football team was awarded the sectional championship by the New Jersey State Interscholastic Athletic Association in 1972 (as co-champion). Since the playoff system was introduced in 1974, the team has won the North I Group I state sectional championships in both 1985 and 1986. The 1985 team won the North I Group I state sectional title with a 10-7 win in overtime against Hasbrouck Heights High School in the championship game. The 1986 team finished the season with a 9-1-1 record after winning the North I Group I tournament final with a 13-7 win against Hasbrouck Heights.

The girls' track team won the Group I indoor relays state championship in 1987.

In 2004, the baseball team won the program's first Group I state championship, defeating New Providence High School by a score of 2–0 in the tournament final. The team won the North I, Group I sectional championship with a 16–1 win over Hasbrouck Heights High School, and then won the state championship with a 3–0 win over Henry P. Becton Regional High School in the semifinals and a 2–0 win in the finals vs. New Providence High School. Pitcher PJ Saporito was named 1st team all-league, all-county and all-state while compiling a 12–0 record and 0.53 ERA, and was selected as the North Jersey Player of the Year. The team repeated as league and as North I, Group I sectional champions in 2005 with a 6–5 win over Glen Rock High School.

The boys' bowling team compiled four straight state sectional titles from 2006 to 2009.

In 2025, the varsity wrestling team won their first sectional championship in program history, defeating Kittatinny Regional High School by a score of 38-31 in the North I Group I sectional final.

== Television appearances ==
On June 23, 2007, a group of 55 music students was selected to participate in the second episode of the reality show Schooled, after which they were surprised with a private concert by The All-American Rejects and given backpacks filled with OfficeMax merchandise. The chain also granted New Milford High School a $60,000 gift card. The one-hour show aired on August 5, 2007, on The CW Television Network.

The school was featured on the truTV show The Principal's Office, originally aired on August 21, 2008.

== Administration ==
The school's principal is Lou Manupelli. His administration team includes the vice principal.

== Notable alumni ==
- Adam Leitman Bailey (born 1970, class of 1988), attorney recognized with the New Milford Distinguished Alumni Award in 2008
- Josh Dela Cruz (born 1989, class of 2007), actor chosen in 2018 to be the host of Blue's Clues & You!, a reboot of the Nickelodeon series Blue's Clues
- Frank DiMaggio (born 1950), retired Canadian football player who played for the Ottawa Rough Riders
- Alan Fuerstman (born 1956), entrepreneur and business executive, who is the founder and CEO of Montage Hotels & Resorts
- Liz Hengber (born 1959, class of 1977), songwriter and musician who has written songs for artists including Reba McEntire
- Ed Marinaro (born 1950, class of 1968), former college and NFL football player and actor in the television series Hill Street Blues
- Rob McClure (born 1982, class of 2000), Theatre World Award-winning and Tony Award-nominated theatrical actor
- Joe Regalbuto (born 1949, class of 1967), actor
- Paul Robalino (class of 2008), writer and cast member for comedy streaming service Dropout
- Bobby Steele (born 1956), guitar player for the horror punk band, The Misfits.
- Robert B. Sturges (class of 1965), Florida businessman and former New Jersey government official
