= Adam Leitman Bailey =

American lawyer

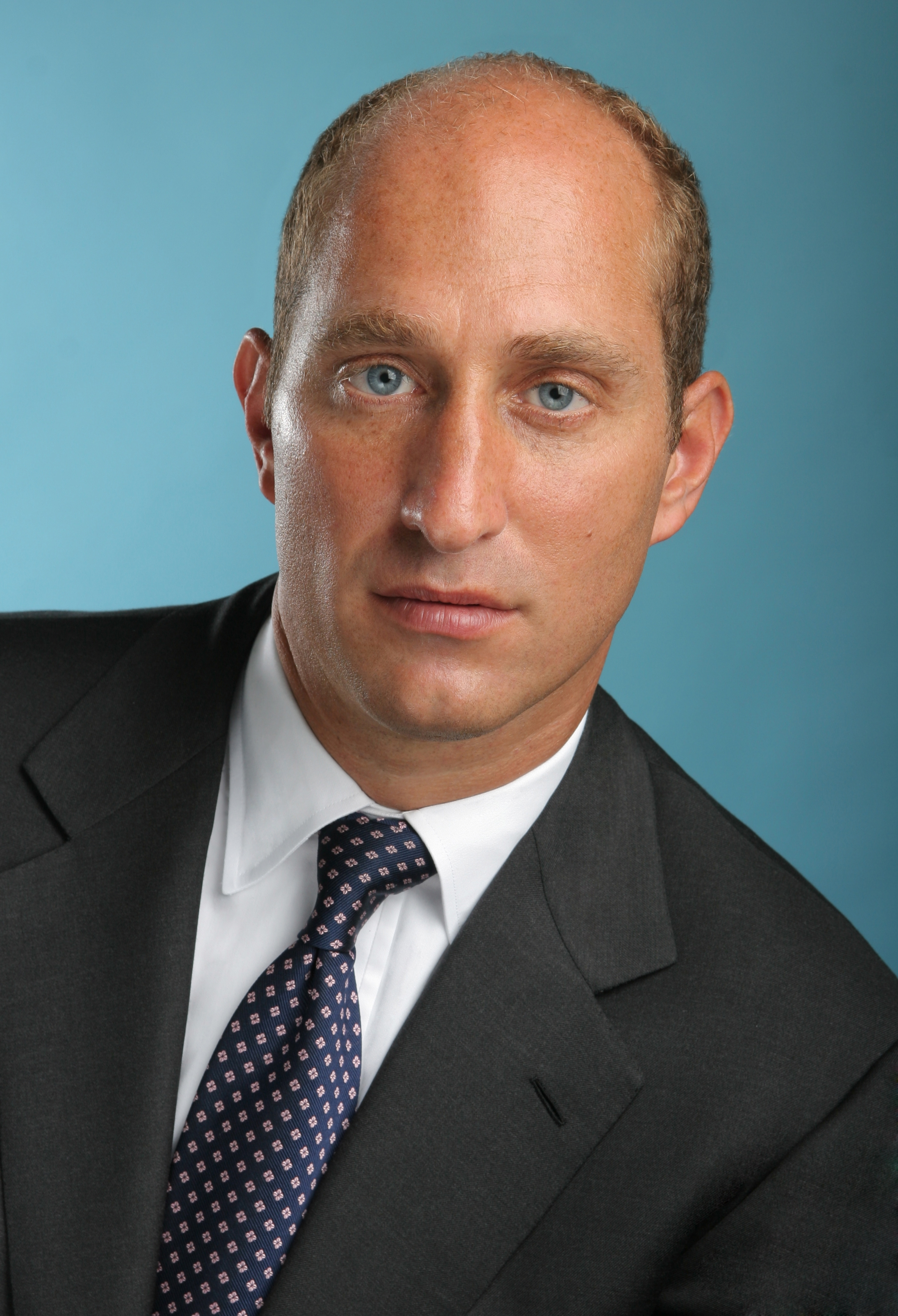
- Born: Bayside, Queens
- Education: Rutgers University; Syracuse University College of Law (J.D.)
- Occupation: Attorney
- Website: www.alblawfirm.com

Adam Leitman Bailey is an American lawyer who practices residential and commercial real estate law as founder of Adam Leitman Bailey, P.C. He was involved in several notable legal cases.

The Martindale-Hubbell peer review system gave Bailey an AV rating, its highest category.

== Early life and education ==
Bailey was born in Bayside, Queens. He moved to California at age five and later moved back to New Milford, New Jersey, where he graduated from New Milford High School. He graduated with honors from Rutgers University and Syracuse University College of Law.

During his time at Syracuse University College of Law, he was elected to the Moot Court team. Bailey studied under respected lawyers Travis Lewin and Deborah Kenn. Adam Leitman Bailey received New Milford High School’s Distinguished Alumni Award.

== Legal practice and notable cases ==
Bailey has been described as a controversial figure in NYC real estate.

In 2006, Adam Leitman Bailey represented an 83-year-old Holocaust survivor, Chaim Indig in a homeowner discrimination case. Indig and his son-in-law were rejected by his cooperative board in Brooklyn New York when attempting to buy his apartment - the president of said board then purchased the apartment for himself. Suing based on discrimination, given the fact that Mr. Indig was immobile and unable to speak due to Parkinson’s disease, Bailey prevailed on all claims and Mr. Indig was able to move into his new home.

In 2008, Bailey formed a non-profit entity known as "Save Harlem" to challenge certain zoning changes being proposed by the City of New York, and to serve as lead plaintiff in a challenge to the proposed demolition of a two-story building at 125th Street and Frederick Douglass Boulevard, and the development of the site as a shopping center. Bailey proposed legislation that would prevent the demolition. Early in 2008, Save Harlem, along with several building tenants (forming a group known as the Coalition to Save Harlem) sued, eventually settling for more than $1 million and gaining the right of the tenants to remain in the building.

Park51 was a planned Muslim community center located near the site of the World Trade Center. Timothy Brown, a former firefighter, sued to prevent construction of the community center so close to the site of the September 11 attacks. Bailey represented the community center on a pro bono basis, and in July 2011 the New York Supreme Court held that Park51 would be permitted to build its proposed center.

Trump SoHo New York is a $450 million hotel condominium. In February 2011, several prospective buyers of condominiums in the building, including French soccer star Olivier Dacourt, sued the developers in federal court, claiming that they had been tricked into buying the condos by the "deceptive" sales figures, and that the number of apartments sold at Trump Soho had been "fraudulently misrepresented." The plaintiffs were represented by Bailey. The suit was settled with plaintiffs recovering 90 per cent of their deposits. Several years later, the case was described as "a watershed case in the world of condo litigation ... [C]ondo attorneys said that developers are now far more reluctant to disclose sales information to buyers’ attorneys, for fear of legal repercussions if they turn out to be wrong.”

In November 2010, during the Great Recession, Bailey used the Interstate Land Sales Full Disclosure Act of 1968 to relieve purchasers of Sky View Parc, a $1 billion condominium complex in Queens, of their contractual obligations to purchase, and obtained the largest residential condominium settlement in New York history by claiming that the developer failed to file a proper disclosure statement. The buyers stated that they were unable to obtain loans after the "collapse of the mortgage market". The developer was ordered to refund 75% of the $5 million in down payments to the buyers who backed out of the $50 million project. Bailey has been credited with being the first lawyer to use the law in this fashion, and he employed the same approach in a later case in an appeal of an adverse trial court decision to the United States Court of Appeals for the Second Circuit. Congress later closed the ILSA loophole with Public Law 113-167, which provides an exemption for condominiums from ILSA's registration requirements for all new construction after enactment.

In 2009, Adam Leitman Bailey received a $10.9 million judgment, and ban against Mendel Brach from selling real estate securities in New York State. The suit in question pertained to a Brooklyn condominium complex on Spencer Street. Bailey represented the Brooklyn condominium complex claiming that Mendel Brach fraudulently obtained a zoning variance by claiming the buildings would serve as faculty housing, instead Brach sold the units on the open market.

In a well reported familial celebrity case Scarlett Johansson fired her mother, Melanie Sloan, as her agent and subsequently entered into a realty dispute. Prior to Ms. Sloan's dismissal, she had entered a contract to buy a two-bedroom apartment on West 43rd Street, Manhattan, New York. Using the reasoning that she no longer had the funds to purchase the apartment after her daughter had fired her, Ms. Sloan sued the sellers for her entire deposit back. Bailey represented the sellers, and while Ms. Sloan received a small part of the down payment back with the sellers retained the rest of the monies. The sellers put the property back on the market and it was listed in contract a week later.

In 2011 Bailey successfully represented a landlord to obtain a money judgement against a tenant owing significant arrears. The tenant, a memorabilia collector, was attempting to sell the white suit John Lennon wore on the cover of the Beatles’ "Abbey Road" album. In order to collect his client’s money, Bailey sued the gallery auctioning the late Beatles’ suit, advising them not to go through with the sale until its clients debt was paid. Bailey was quoted as saying, “We’re all coming together over John Lennon” when the debt was resolved and paid in full.

In 2014, Bailey represented a condo board at 3 E. 78th St., to successfully halt a proposed NYU's expansion plan. NYU was seeking to connect their fine arts institute to a donated space in the condominium building via a breezeway. While NYU claims the bylaws allow alterations, the board argued it needed their approval. Bailey accused NYU of misrepresenting itself in the application and sought its rejection. Pointing to bylaws protecting the building's structure, as it was designed by American architect C.P.H. Gilbert in 1899, Bailey successfully stopped the NYU expansion.

In an ambitious plan to reconfigure a four-apartment house in the Chelsea district of New York City, into a home, former owners of the Mets, Sterling Equities Planning were rejected by the city Landmarks Preservation Commission. Adam Leitman Bailey represented both a next-door neighbor Adriana Cisneros, and the local block association. Successfully stopping the development, Bailey later told the Wall Street Journal “Now the owners can spend more money on the Mets rather than building a McMansion in a neighborhood where it doesn’t belong.”

Adam Leitman Bailey also represented Rosario Dawson and her family in a well publicized real estate matter in New York’s East Village. Dawson’s family were in a dispute with the co-op management of the building where they purchased their family home. Originally a squatter building, Dawsons’s family earned the right to purchase their apartment when the building was converted to affordable housing. Although Rosario Dawson no longer lives in the building, a number of years ago, other family members including Rosario’s mother purchased the family’s apartments in the building with Adam Leitman Bailey’s assistance.

On May 3, 2019, Bailey was suspended from practicing law for a four-month term. The suspension was imposed for undignified conduct (including telling a party suing Bailey's client that he "should commit suicide") and for threatening criminal charges to obtain an advantage in a civil matter.

== Philanthropy ==
Bailey established the “Raymond 'Hap' Harrison” scholarship in 2008, named after his former high school track coach. Since then, he has given four-year academic awards to 17 students: 10 from New Milford and seven from New York City schools.

== Entertainment ==
Bailey wrote three scenes for the 2014 Ramin Bahrani movie, 99 Homes. As a result, the attorney foreclosing on homes in the movie, played by Jonathan Vane, was named “Lawyer Bailey”. Bailey also appeared on an episode of Dateline NBC investigating the art of persuasion.

== Books ==
In 2011, Bailey wrote Finding The Uncommon Deal: A Top New York Lawyer Explains How to Buy a Home for the Lowest Possible Price. The book gained Bailey the 2012 "First Time Author" award granted by the National Association of Real Estate Editors.

Bailey has written a children’s book, Home, which was named a Silver winner in the category Picture Book/Early Reader by Literary Classics.

Bailey is also the co-editor-in-chief and author of Real Estate Titles: The Practice of Law in New York, a comprehensive legal treatise widely used by attorneys and title professionals.

== Honors ==
Bailey was named one of New York’s "Most Powerful Real Estate Attorneys" by the Commercial Observer in 2015.

Bailey was named one of New York's Top Real Estate litigators by Chambers & Partners in 2021.

Bailey was also recognized in The Best Lawyers in America since 2015 in Real Estate Law New York, New York.
