= Fuerstman =

Fuerstman is a surname. Notable people with the surname include:

- Alan Fuerstman, American entrepreneur and business executive
- Joseph Fuerstman (born 1979), American singer-songwriter and bandleader
