= Robert B. Sturges =

Florida businessperson

Robert B. Sturges is a Florida businessman and former New Jersey government official. He is a limited partner of the Miami Heat basketball team and former executive at Carnival Corp .

== Early life and education ==
Sturges is a graduate of Dartmouth College and a cum laude graduate of Rutgers Law School. He was raised in New Milford, New Jersey. His father, Robert W. Sturges, moved the family from New England to New Jersey after being hired as head football coach at Bogota High School. Sturges won all county honors in football, baseball, and basketball while at New Milford High School. He then went on to be a two time letterman on the Dartmouth Big Green men's basketball team.

== Career ==
Sturges started his career as an attorney. He served as Deputy Attorney General and Chief Prosecutor of Organized Crime in New Jersey until 1980. Sturges was then appointed Director of the New Jersey Division of Gaming Enforcement. He oversaw the investigations for New Jersey Casino License applicants including Steven Wynn, Hugh Hefner, and Donald Trump. A resident of Wyckoff, New Jersey, he commuted 90 minutes each way to Trenton, where his state government positions were located, so that he could spend time with his family.

In 1983, he entered private practice as a partner at Ferro & Sturges, consulting for casino owner, Ted Arison, founder of Carnival Cruise Lines. Arison, convinced Sturges to move to Miami and in 1986, he was named vice president and Special Assistant to the chairman of the Board of Carnival Cruise lines. Sturges helped Arison expand his business ventures including bringing an NBA franchise to Miami.

In 2006, Sturges became CEO of Nevada Gold & Casinos Inc. (NYSE MKT: UWN). He also served on the Board of Directors for Benihana and AmeriCredit Corp. (NYSE: ACF) until the company was sold to General Motors for $3.5 billion.

== Personal life ==
Sturges lives in Coral Gables, Florida. He married Nancie (née Schneider) Sturges in 1972.
