= Mary Joyce Doyle =

American nun, librarian

Mary Joyce Doyle (1923 – June 25, 2016) was an American nun and librarian who founded the library consortium that revolutionized the borrowing of books in Bergen County, New Jersey through the creation of the Bergen County Cooperative Library System.

== Life and career ==
Doyle, the middle of three sisters born and raised in Trenton, New Jersey, attended St. Mary's Cathedral High School. An avid reader of the Nancy Drew books, she was educated in a few Catholic schools before joining Sisters of Mercy during her early teens. After graduating from Georgian Court University, Doyle attended Catholic University of America, where she obtained her master's degree in library science before getting a job as assistant library director in Fair Lawn, New Jersey.

She abandoned her religious views in 1974, and became a director of the Bergenfield Public Library. Two years later, Doyle introduced reciprocal lending between Bergen County public libraries, because one of the Upper Saddle River residents was unable to locate a book he wanted. On October 1, 1979, the Bergen County Cooperative Library System was launched and was financed by the Bergen County Freeholders and the New Jersey State Library respectively. Doyle taught at parochial schools in Central and South Jersey prior to becoming a head librarian at Holy Spirit High School in Absecon, New Jersey. She also was a president of the New Jersey Library Association before dying at the age of 87 at her home in New Milford, New Jersey.

The Mary Joyce Doyle Scholarship Awards are held annually since 2018.
