= Public Law 113-167 =

United States law

- Long title: To amend the Interstate Land Sales Full Disclosure Act to clarify how the Act applies to condominiums.
- Announced in: the 113th United States Congress
- Sponsored by: Rep. Carolyn B. Maloney (D, NY-12)
- Number of co-sponsors: 3

Citations
- Public law: Pub. L. 113–167 (text) (PDF)

Codification
- Acts affected: Interstate Land Sales Full Disclosure Act
- U.S.C. sections affected: 15 U.S.C. § 1702

Legislative history
- Introduced in the House as H.R. 2600 by Rep. Carolyn B. Maloney (D, NY-12) on June 28, 2013; Committee consideration by United States House Committee on Financial Services, Passed the House of Representatives on September 26, 2013 (410-0); Passed the Senate on September 18, 2014 (Unanimous consent); Signed into law by President Barack Obama on September 18, 2014

Pub. L. 113–167 (text) (PDF) (formerly the bill H.R. 2600), a United States public law, that is entitled "to amend the Interstate Land Sales Full Disclosure Act to clarify how the Act applies to condominiums," is a bill that was introduced into the United States House of Representatives during the 113th United States Congress. The Interstate Land Sales Full Disclosure Act of 1968 was passed in 1968 with the intention of helping protect consumers from land-related scams, but regulating the sale of land across state lines. The act requires sellers to prepare center information about the piece of property they are trying to sell and disclose it in a "Property Report." The law was originally administered by the United States Department of Housing and Urban Development, but is currently run by the Consumer Financial Protection Bureau. H.R. 2600 would make changes to this law related to condominiums.

== Provisions of the bill ==
This summary is based largely on the summary provided by the Congressional Research Service, a public domain source.

H.R. 2600 would amend the Interstate Land Sales Full Disclosure Act to exempt from certain registration and disclosure requirements the sale or lease of a condominium unit not already exempt from coverage under such Act.

== Procedural history ==
H.R. 2600 was introduced into the House on June 28, 2013, by Rep. Carolyn B. Maloney (D, NY-12). It was referred to the United States House Committee on Financial Services. On September 20, 2013, House Majority Leader Eric Cantor announced that H.R. 1961 would be on the legislative schedule for the week of September 23. It was scheduled to be considered under a suspension of the rules on September 25, 2013. On September 27, 2013, on the verge of a government shutdown by Republicans, the House of Representatives passed H.R. 2600 by a vote of 410–0. The bill would provide an exemption for condominiums from ILSA's registration requirements and would apply to all new constructions after enactment. On September 18, 2014, the United States Senate voted to pass the bill with unanimous consent. On September 26, 2014, President Barack Obama signed the bill and it became Pub. L. 113–167 (text) (PDF).

== See also ==
- List of bills in the 113th United States Congress
- Interstate Land Sales Full Disclosure Act of 1968
