= New Milford School District =

School district in Bergen County, New Jersey, US

Address
- 145 Madison Avenue New Milford, Bergen County, New Jersey, 07646; United States
- Coordinates: 40.941365°N 74.022944°W

District information
- Grades: K-12
- Superintendent: Peter Galasso
- Business administrator: Stephanie Kuchar
- Schools: 4

Students and staff
- Enrollment: 2,037 (as of 2023–24)
- Faculty: 165.6 FTEs
- Student–teacher ratio: 12.3:1

Other information
- District Factor Group: FG
- Website: www.nmpsd.org
Ind.	Per pupil	District spending	Rank (*)	K-12 average	%± vs. average
1A	Total Spending	$16,368	16	$18,891	−13.4%
1	Budgetary Cost	13,609	32	14,783	−7.9%
2	Classroom Instruction	7,207	11	8,763	−17.8%
6	Support Services	2,190	44	2,392	−8.4%
8	Administrative Cost	1,827	61	1,485	23.0%
10	Operations & Maintenance	1,908	55	1,783	7.0%
13	Extracurricular Activities	437	47	268	63.1%
16	Median Teacher Salary	55,520	7	64,043
Data from NJDoE 2014 Taxpayers' Guide to Education Spending. *Of K-12 districts with 1,800-3,500 students. Lowest spending=1; Highest=68

The New Milford School District is a comprehensive community public school district that serves students in kindergarten through twelfth grade from New Milford, in Bergen County, in the U.S. state of New Jersey.

As of the 2023–24 school year, the district, comprised of four schools, had an enrollment of 2,037 students and 165.6 classroom teachers (on an FTE basis), for a student–teacher ratio of 12.3:1.

== History ==
In the 2011–12 school year, the high school introduced an academies program to the school, similar to the structure at the Bergen Academies. These were since made as sub-academies within the high school such as the school of sciences and the school of history.

The district had been classified by the New Jersey Department of Education as being in District Factor Group "FG", the fourth-highest of eight groupings. District Factor Groups organize districts statewide to allow comparison by common socioeconomic characteristics of the local districts. From lowest socioeconomic status to highest, the categories are A, B, CD, DE, FG, GH, I and J.

== Schools ==
Schools in the district (with 2023–24 enrollment data from the National Center for Education Statistics) are:

Elementary schools

- Berkley Street School with 434 students in grades K–5
  - Caridad Chrisomalis, principal
- Bertram F. Gibbs Elementary School with 508 students in grades K–5
  - Jessica Torre, principal

Middle school

- David E. Owens Middle School with 514 students in grades 6–8
  - James DeLalla, principal

High school

- New Milford High School with 580 students in grades 9–12
  - Lou Manuppelli, principal

== In the news ==
Two students were removed from school after a March 2007 incident in which a sixth-grade student brought a BB gun to Owens Middle School, showed it to other students and hid the gun in another student's locker.

== Administration ==
Core members of the district's administration are:

- Peter Galasso, superintendent
- Stephanie Kuchar, business administrator and board secretary

== Board of education ==
The district's board of education, comprised of nine members, sets policy and oversees the fiscal and educational operation of the district through its administration. As a Type II school district, the board's trustees are elected directly by voters to serve three-year terms of office on a staggered basis, with three seats up for election each year held (since 2012) as part of the November general election. The board appoints a superintendent to oversee the district's day-to-day operations and a business administrator to supervise the business functions of the district.
