= Demarest–Bloomer–Hart House =

Historic house in New Jersey, United States

- U.S. National Register of Historic Places
- New Jersey Register of Historic Places
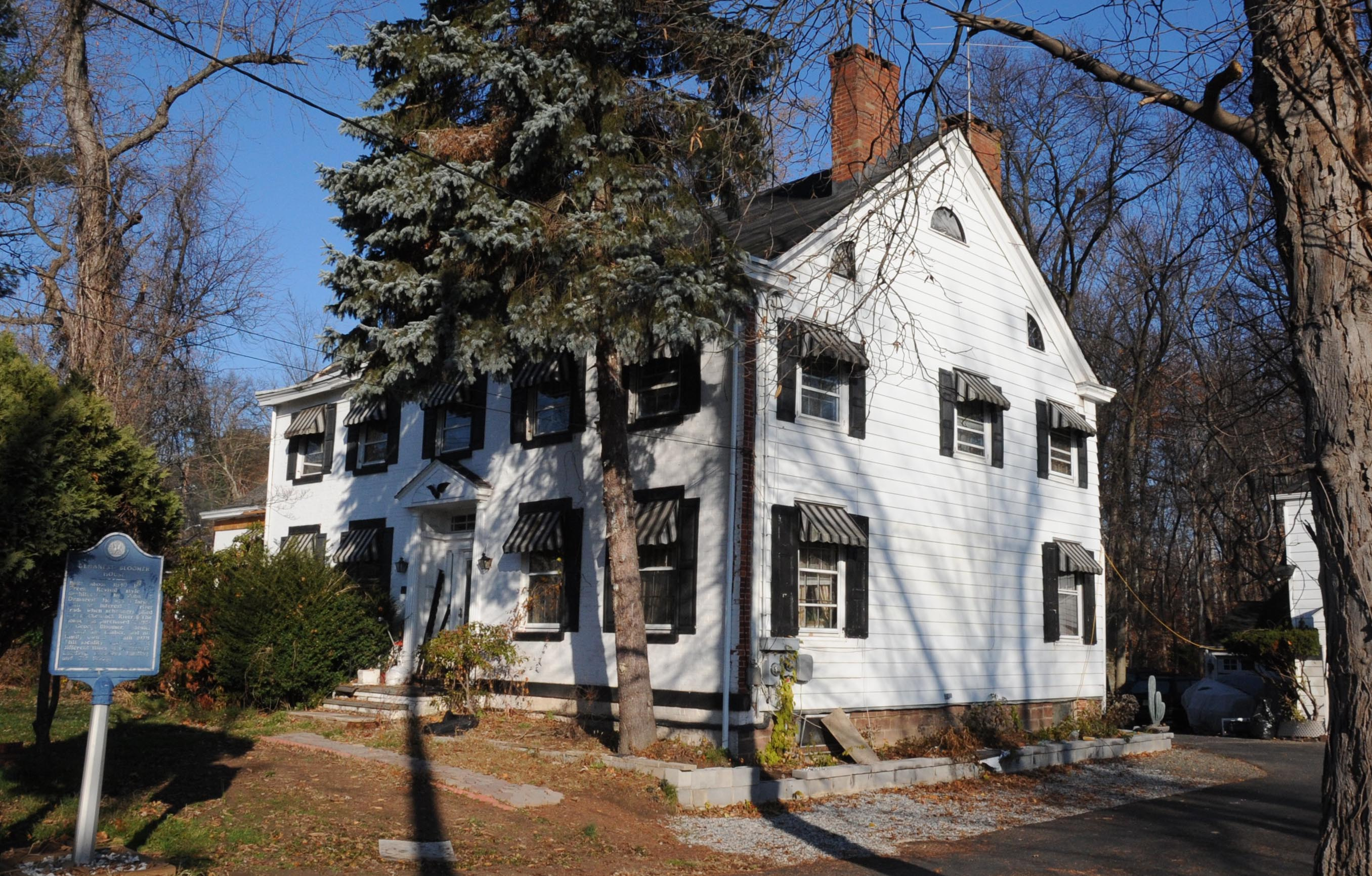

- Location within Bergen County, New Jersey Location within New Jersey Location within the United States
- Location: 147 River Edge Avenue, New Milford, New Jersey
- Coordinates: 40°56′6″N 74°1′41″W
- Architectural style: Greek Revival, Federal, Vernacular Greek Revival
- NRHP reference No.: 85002775
- NJRHP No.: 583

Significant dates
- Added to NRHP: November 7, 1985
- Designated NJRHP: September 20, 1985

The Demarest–Bloomer–Hart House, also known as the Demarest–Bloomer House, is located at 147 River Edge Avenue in the borough of New Milford in Bergen County, New Jersey, United States. The historic Greek Revival house was added to the National Register of Historic Places on November 7, 1985, for its significance in architecture.

== History and description ==
According to the nomination form, the two and one-half story frame house was built around 1800 by a member of the Demarest family. The front facade is brick laid in Flemish bond. In 1864, George C. Demarest sold the house to George Bloomer. In 1934, the house was sold to Harry C. Homburg. In 1946, it was sold to F. Bruce Hart.

== See also ==
- National Register of Historic Places listings in Bergen County, New Jersey
