= Frank DiMaggio =

Canadian football player (born 1950)

Profile
- Position: Quarterback

Personal information
- Born: May 1, 1950 (age 76); New York City, New York, U.S.
- Listed height: 6 ft 1 in (1.85 m)
- Listed weight: 210 lb (95 kg)

Career information
- High school: New Milford (NJ)
- College: Temple

Career history
- 1973: Ottawa Rough Riders
- 1973: Bridgeport Jets
- 1974: Philadelphia Bell

Awards and highlights
- Grey Cup champion (1973)

Frank James DiMaggio (born May 1, 1950) is an American former professional football player who played for the Ottawa Rough Riders. He played college football at Temple University.

Raised in New Milford, New Jersey, DiMaggio played prep football at New Milford High School.
