= Michael Nelson (political scientist) =

American political scientist

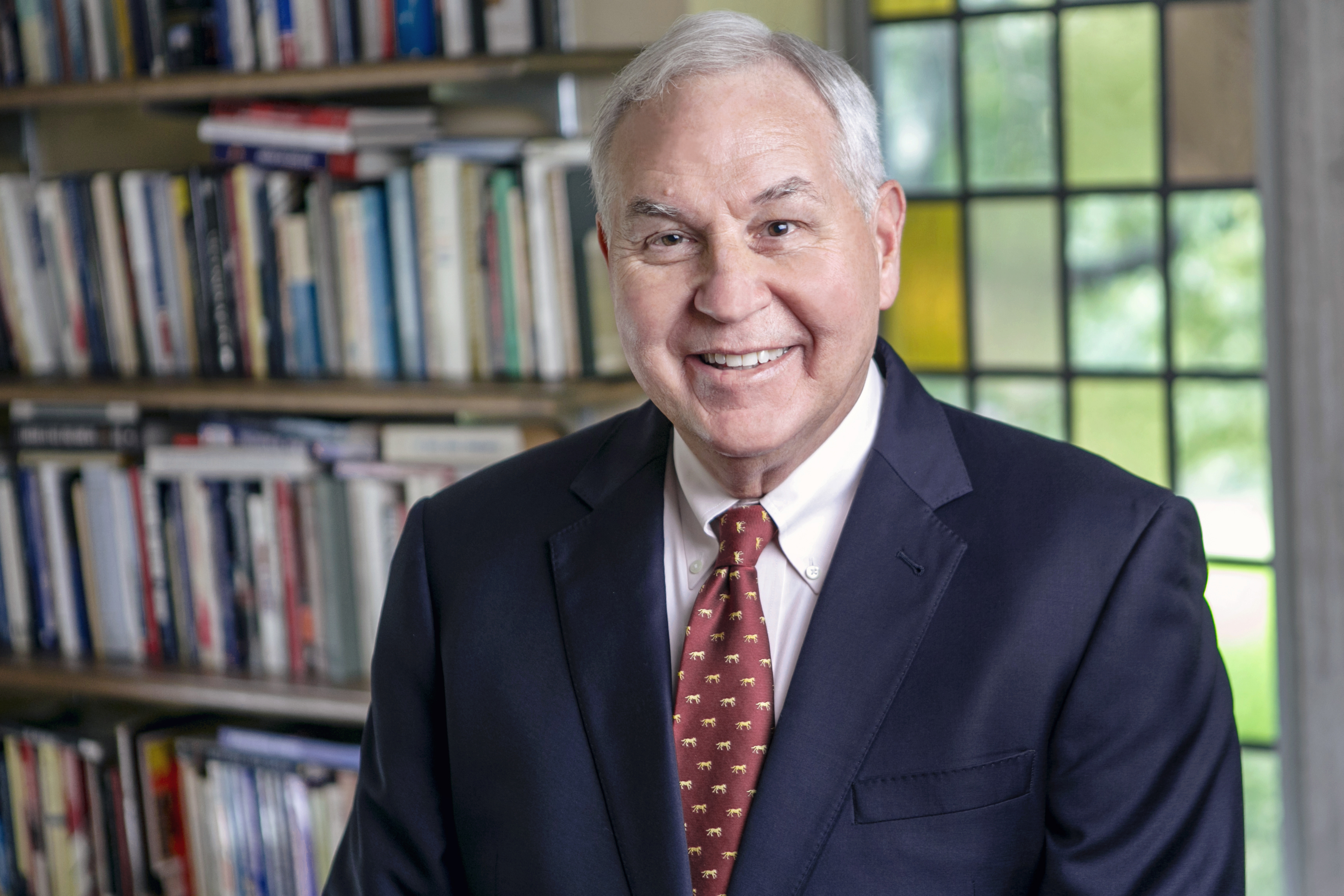
- Born: June 11, 1949 (age 77); New Milford, NJ, United States
- Education: College of William and Mary; Johns Hopkins University

Michael Nelson (born June 11, 1949) is an American political scientist, noted for his work on the Presidency and elections. He is a Fulmer Professor of Political Science at Rhodes College.

== Early life ==
Nelson was born and raised in New Milford, New Jersey. He studied at the College of William and Mary and graduated in 1971 with a BA. Afterward, he received both his M.A. and Ph.D. in Political Science from Johns Hopkins University.

== Career ==
Nelson was an Assistant Professor (1979–1984) and then Associate Professor (1984–1991) at Vanderbilt University. He was appointed Professor of Political Science at Rhodes College in 1991 and has been Fulmer Professor of Political Science there since 2005. He was a Compton Visiting Professor of Politics at the University of Virginia (2010) and has been a Senior Fellow at the Miller Center of Public Affairs at the University of Virginia since 2007. From 2018 to 2020, he was a contributing editor and columnist for the Daily Memphian and from 1992 to 2022, he was the political analyst for WMC-TV, the NBC affiliate in Memphis. From 1995 to 2024, he was a Senior Fellow at the University of Virginia's Miller Center.

Nelson has published more than thirty books on the presidency, elections, bureaucracy, public policy, southern politics, and liberal education. More than fifty of his articles have been reprinted in books of political science, history, sociology, sports, music, and English composition. He has been published by Alfred A. Knopf, Johns Hopkins University Press, Cornell University Press, Duke University Press, the University Press of Kansas, Louisiana State University Press, Vanderbilt University Press, CQ Press, University of Virginia Press, and other publishing sources.

Among the scholarly journals Nelson has published articles in are the Journal of Politics, Political Science Quarterly, Journal of Policy History, Presidential Studies Quarterly, Nine: A Journal of Baseball History and Culture, Congress and the Presidency, Popular Music and Society, and Virginia Quarterly Review.

In addition to his articles on political topics, Nelson has written lengthy articles about Charles Dickens, Frank Sinatra, Garrison Keillor, C. S. Lewis, Jonathan Edwards, Stephen L. Carter, Ward Just, the military academies, the Iliad, the Odyssey, the Aeneid, liberal education, baseball, football, and music. A former writer-editor with the Washington Monthly, he has published articles in a number of popular magazines, including the Weekly Standard, Newsweek, Saturday Review, Legal Affairs, and the American Prospect. He also has written articles for newspapers such as the New York Times, International Herald Tribune, Washington Post, USA Today and Baltimore Sun, and websites such as Politico and insidehighered.com. He wrote frequently for the Review section of the Chronicle of Higher Education and the Claremont Review of Books.

Nelson created and served as editor of the Interpreting American Politics book series for Johns Hopkins University Press. He created and, with Sewanee president John L. McCardell, edits the American Presidential Elections book series for the University Press of Kansas. He also created and edits the Landmark Presidential Decisions book series for the University Press of Kansas. He was the political analyst for WMC-TV in Memphis for thirty years and was the host of “Informed Sources” on Memphis' public television station, WKNO-TV.

Nelson has won the 2015 American Political Science Association (APSA) Richard E. Neustadt Award for the Outstanding book on the Presidency and Executive Politics published during the previous year for his book Resilient America: Electing Nixon in 1968, Channeling Dissent, and Dividing Government (University Press of Kansas), and the V.O. Key Award for Outstanding Book on Southern Politics for How the South Joined the Gambling Nation: The Politics of State Policy Innovation (2009).

== Awards ==
- In 2015, the APSA gave Nelson the Richard E. Neustadt Award for the Outstanding book on the Presidency and Executive Politics published during the previous year for Resilient America: Electing Nixon in 1968, Channeling Dissent, and Dividing Government (University Press of Kansas).
- Nelson won the V.O. Key Award for Outstanding Book on Southern Politics for How the South Joined the Gambling Nation: The Politics of State Policy Innovation (2009).
- Clarence Day Dean‟s Award for Outstanding Research and Creative Activity, Rhodes College, 2001.
- Ellen Gregg Ingalls Award for Excellence in Classroom Teaching, Vanderbilt University, 1989.
- Jeffrey Nordhaus Award for Excellence in Undergraduate Teaching in the College of Arts and Sciences, Vanderbilt University, 1987.
- ASCAP-Deems Taylor Award for music journalism and A.D. Emmart Prize for writing in the humanities for “How the Baltimore Symphony Got To Be So Good,” Baltimore, Vol. 71, No. 9 (September 1978), pp. 70–77. Reprinted in the magazine‟s eightieth anniversary issue (October 1987), pp. 110–11, 142–43.

== Publications ==
- The American Presidency: Origins and Development, 1776-2026 (Washington: Congressional Quarterly Press, 2026)
- The Elections of 2024, editor (Charlottesville: University of Virginia Press, 2025).
- How College Presidents Succeed: Lessons in Leadership from Three Generations of Reveleys (Charlottesville: University of Virginia Press, 2025).
- Vaulting Ambition: FDR's Campaign to Pack the Supreme Court and Tame the Executive Branch (Lawrence: University Press of Kansas, 2023)
- 43: Inside the Presidency of George W. Bush coeditor with Barbara A. Perry and Russell L. Riley (Lawrence: University Press of Kansas, 2022)
- The Elections of 2020, editor (Charlottesville: University of Virginia Press, 2021)
- The Presidency: Facing Constitutional Crossroads, coeditor with Barbara A. Perry (Charlottesville: University of Virginia Press, 2021)
- Clinton's Elections: 1992, 1996, and the Birth of a New Era of Governance (Lawrence: University of Kansas Press, 2020)
- Trump: The First Two Years, (Charlottesville: University of Virginia Press, 2019).
- Debating Reform: Conflicting Perspectives on How to Fix the American Political System, 4th ed., with Richard J. Ellis (Washington, D.C.: Congressional Quarterly Press, 2020.
- Debating the Presidency: Conflicting Perspectives on the American Executive, 5th ed., with Richard J. Ellis (Washington, D.C.: Congressional Quarterly Press, 2020
- Crucible: The President's First Year, coeditor with Stefanie Abbott and Jeffrey Chidester. (Charlottesville: University of Virginia Press, 2018).
- The Evolving Presidency: Other Landmark Documents, 6th ed., editor (Washington: Congressional Quarterly Press, 2018).
- The Election of 2016, editor. (Washington: Congressional Quarterly Press, 2017).
- 42: Inside the Bill Clinton Presidency, coeditor with Barbara Perry and Russell Riley. (Ithaca: Cornell University Press, 2016).
- Resilient America: Electing Nixon in 1968, Channeling Dissent, and Dividing Government(Lawrence: University Press of Kansas, 2014).
- The Presidency and the Political System, editor (Washington: Congressional Quarterly Press, 11th ed., 2014).
- 41: Inside the George H.W. Bush Presidency, coeditor with Barbara A. Perry (Ithaca, N.Y.: Cornell University Press, 2014).
- The Elections of 2012, editor (Washington, D.C.: Congressional Quarterly Press, 2014).
- Guide to the Presidency and the Executive Branch 4th ed., editor (Washington: Congressional Quarterly, 2013).
- Governing at Home: The White House and Domestic Policymaking, coeditor with Russell L. Riley (Lawrence: University Press of Kansas, 2011).
- The President’s Words: Speeches and Speechwriting in the Modern White House, coeditor with Russell L. Riley (Lawrence: University Press of Kansas, 2010).
- The Elections of 2008, editor (Washington, D.C: Congressional Quarterly Press, 2010).
- How the South Joined the Gambling Nation: The Politics of State Policy Innovation, with John Mason (Baton Rouge: Louisiana State University Press, 2007).
- The Elections of 2004, editor (Washington, D.C: Congressional Quarterly Press, 2005).
- The Elections of 2000, editor. (Washington, D.C: Congressional Quarterly Press, 2001).
- Governing Gambling: Politics and Policy in State, Tribe, and Nation, with John Mason (Washington: Century Foundation/Brookings Institution, 2001).
- Alive at the Core: Exemplary Approaches to General Education in the Humanities, with associates (San Francisco: Jossey-Bass, 2000).
- Celebrating the Humanities: A Half-Century of the Search Course at Rhodes College, editor (Nashville, Tenn.: Vanderbilt University Press, 1996).
- The Elections of 1996, editor (Washington: Congressional Quarterly Press, 1997).
- The Elections of 1992, editor. (Washington: Congressional Quarterly Press, 1993).
- Historic Documents on Presidential Elections 1787-1988, editor (Washington: Congressional Quarterly, 1992).
- The Elections of 1988, editor (Washington: Congressional Quarterly Press, 1989).
- A Heartbeat Away (Washington: Brookings Institution, 1988).
- Presidential Selection, coeditor with Alexander Heard (Durham, N.C.: Duke University Press, 1987).
- The Elections of 1984, editor (Washington: Congressional Quarterly Press, 1985).
- Presidents, Politics and Policy, with Erwin C. Hargrove (Baltimore: Johns Hopkins University Press and New York: Alfred A. Knopf, 1984).
- The Culture of Bureaucracy, coeditor with Charles Peters (New York: Holt, Rinehart and Winston, 1979).
