= The Art Center of Northern New Jersey =

Coordinates: 40.949359°N 74.017643°W

Art Center of Northern New Jersey is a fine arts school and gallery offering art classes to the general public. It was founded in 1956, and is located on the premises of the old Lutheran Church in New Milford, New Jersey, United States. The Art Center took over the building after the current Lutheran Church St Matthew's received its new home across the road.

== Overview ==
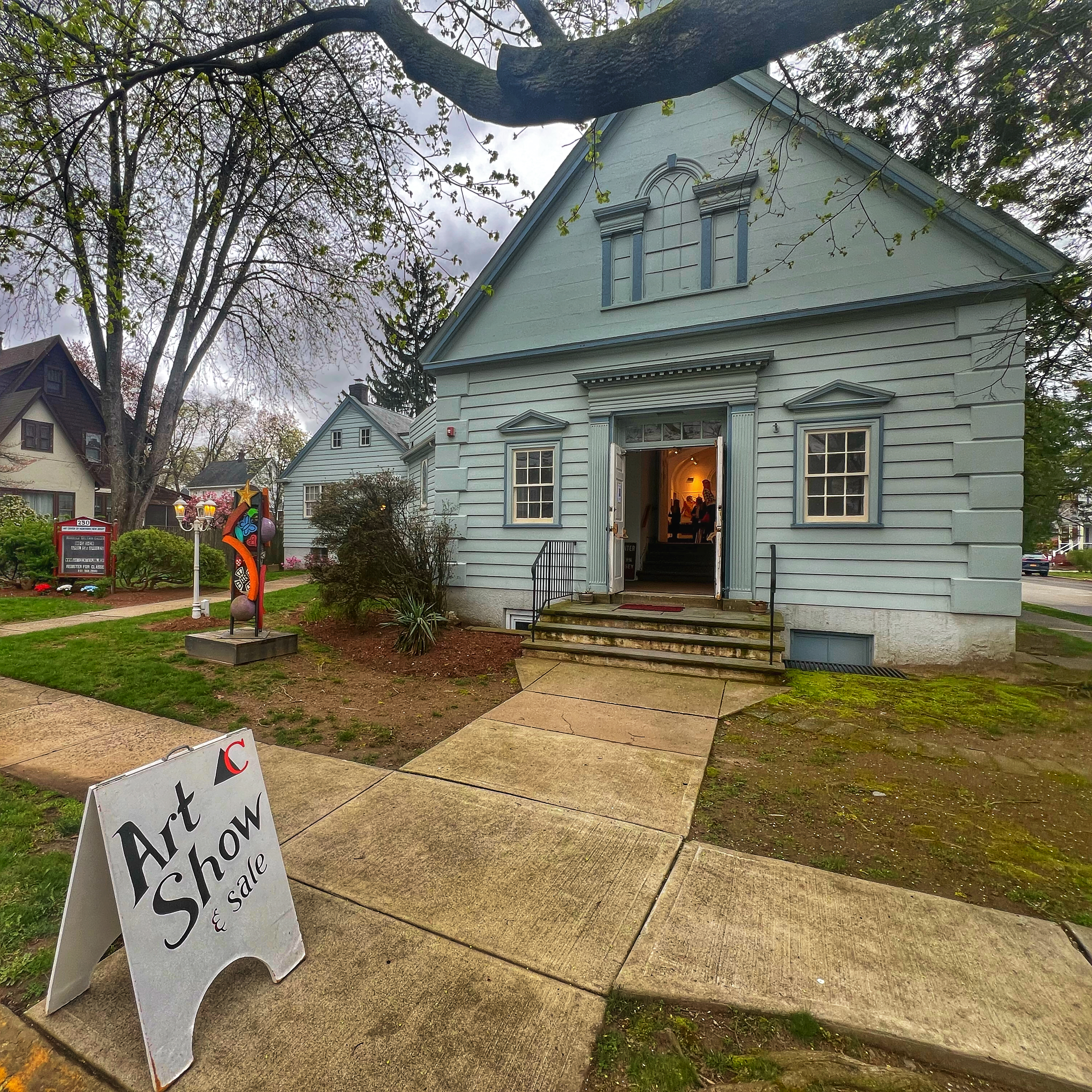
Exterior of the art center, a former church.

The facility caters to adult and children wishing to get schooled in fine art. Classes are available to the general public. In addition to painting and photo studios the center can boast that it is the only place in the area which has a stone sculpture studio' with pneumatic equipment." It also has a fully equipped printmaking studio supported by two Charles Brand presses, darkroom and high-intensity light table for photo-based platemaking.

The Art Center offers a full year-round program. Classes are taught by skilled professionals in drawing, painting (oil, acrylic, watercolor, mixed media), photography, print making, and sculpture in stone and wood. Instructors monitor and teach life drawing and painting sessions.

The facility sponsors four affiliate groups of artists: painters, sculptors, watercolorists, and print makers. The Center's gallery program hosts local and national level exhibits on its premises in the Marcella Geltman Gallery.

== Events ==
- The Tri-State Juried Watercolor Show (Sponsored by ACWA)
- Annual Bergen County Seniors Juried Art Show
- Annual Focus New Jersey Juried Art Show
- The Annual National Juried Show
- WCWA Tri-State Juried Watercolor Show
