= Coalition to Save Harlem =

The Coalition to Save Harlem (CSH) is a campaign organization whose aim is to reclaim, preserve and protect the local community of Harlem, New York City. Members of the organization include residents, business owners, community-based organizations, artists, activists and civic groups.

The Coalition to Save Harlem advocates for community improvement and development that is in the best interest of the long-term residents of the Harlem community, and therefore encourages community participation and leadership in the development process. The group campaigns for housing rights and the rights of locally owned business and street vendors, and members also address issues regarding gentrification, education, housing, employment and economics in Harlem and adjoining neighborhoods and communities.

The CSH was extensively involved in organizing opposition among the Harlem community against the 125th Street Rezoning Plan proposed by the New York City Department of City Planning from late 2007 to mid-2008. The CSH organized the "Hands Across Harlem" event that encouraged Harlem residents to demonstrate peacefully against the plan.

One focal point of dispute was the largest building in area in Harlem. Legislation was proposed requiring the owner to give the building back to the community. After many hearings and support from local politicians including Charles Rangel, the legislation became a way for Harlem residents to be sure that their culture was being preserved. The CSH, represented by the real estate attorney Adam Leitman Bailey, filed suit against the developer, who eventually settled for over $1 million and allowed the tenants to continue their residency, along with a large payment. The building still stood in July 2011.
