= Haute Living =

American lifestyle magazine

- Camille Kostek on the cover of the inaugural “Miami Swim” edition in 2020
- Categories: Lifestyle magazine
- Frequency: Bi-monthly
- Publisher: Haute Living, Inc
- Total circulation: 35,000 - San Francisco; 35,000 - New York; 35,000 - Los Angeles; 35,000 - Miami (2016)
- Country: United States
- Based in: Miami, Florida
- Language: English
- Website: hauteliving.com

Haute Living is a global luxury lifestyle media and experiential platform founded in 2004. It is based in Miami, Florida, and the executive publishers of the magazine are Kamal Hotchandani, CEO, and Seth Semilof, COO.

Haute Living is a flagship publication of Haute Media Group and operates across print publishing, digital media, live events, and affiliated business divisions focused on high-net-worth audiences and the global luxury market.

The magazine is published by Haute Living, Inc., and distributed on a bi-monthly basis in New York City, Los Angeles, Miami, and San Francisco.

== Content ==
Haute Living covers interviews with entrepreneurs, business magnates, and celebrities. The magazine also covers reviews on luxury products such as private jets, mega yachts, supercars, jewelry, and timepieces. The magazine's online component, HauteLiving.com, provides a web-based version of the magazine.

=== Online version ===
The online version of the publication covers the cities of New York, Los Angeles, San Francisco, Miami, Las Vegas, Dubai, London, Boston, and Dallas. The United States as a whole is covered in a more universal way under the "National" heading.

== Distribution model ==
Haute Living is distributed to flights on private jets and direct-mailed to subscribers in the United States. Internationally, the magazine is placed in private airports, building lobbies, and luxury hotels.

== Demographics ==
The median age of an Haute Living reader is slightly over 49 years of age with over 96% owning their primary residence with an average value of over $10 million.
