= Alan Fuerstman =

American entrepreneur

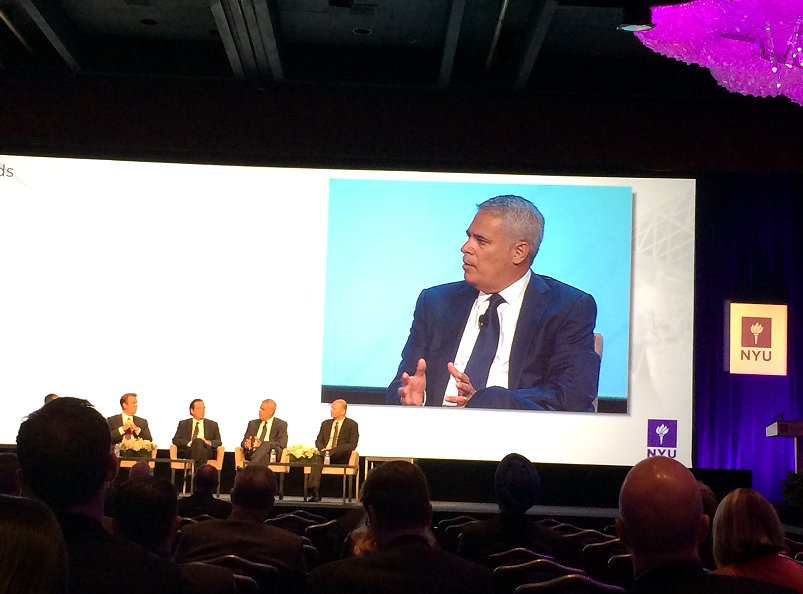
- Born: Alan J. Fuerstman; 1956 (age 69–70); New Milford, New Jersey, United States
- Education: Gettysburg College (B.A.)
- Occupations: Founder & CEO, Montage Hotels & Resorts
- Spouse: Susan J. Fuerstman
- Children: 4
- Website: montagehotels.com

Alan Fuerstman, born 1956 in New Milford, New Jersey, is an American entrepreneur and business executive. He is best known as the founder of Montage Hotels & Resorts where he serves as the company's CEO. He is listed on the Haute 100 and has won the Ernst & Young Entrepreneur of the Year Award.

== Early life and education ==
Fuerstman grew up in New Jersey and began working in the hospitality industry when he was 17. While attending New Milford High School, he worked part-time as a bellman for a Marriott Hotel. After high school, he attended Gettysburg College where he graduated with a Bachelor of Arts degree in 1978. Fuerstman accepted a position with Marriott to join its management training program.

== Career ==
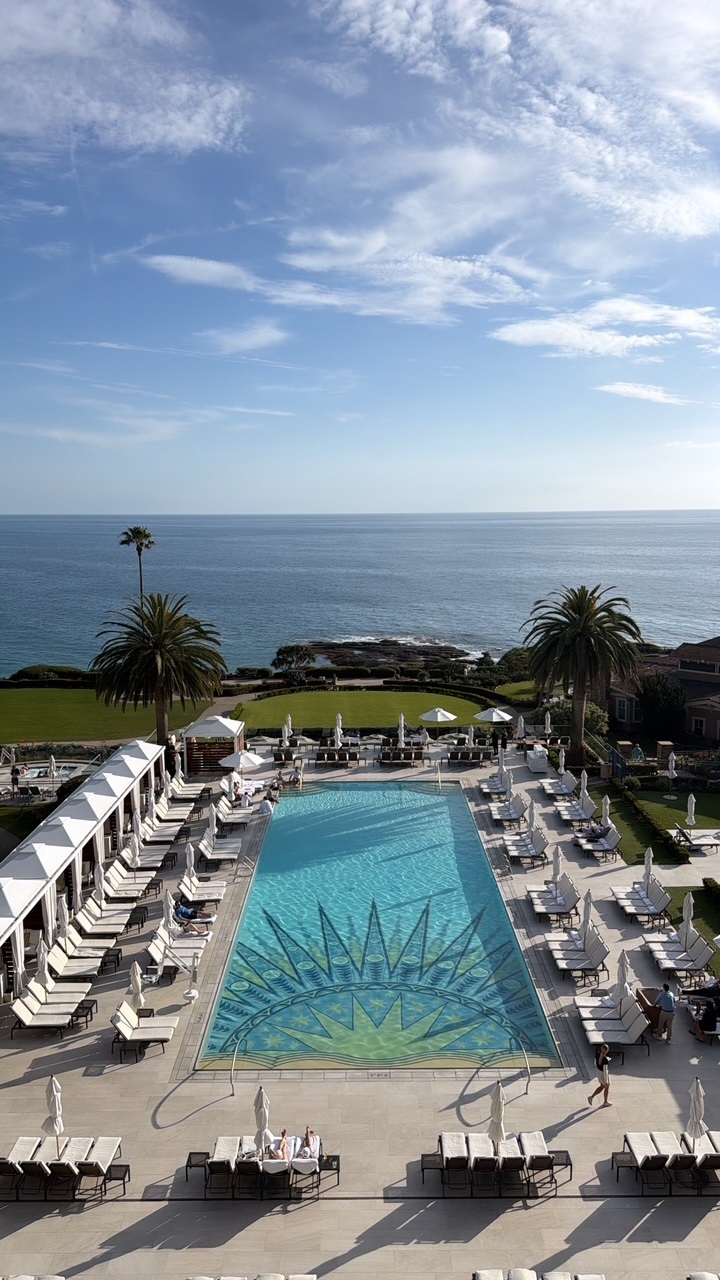
View of the pool at the Montage Hotel in Laguna Beach in 2026.

Fuerstman began his career with the hospitality conglomerate Marriott International, taking a position with the company after graduating from college. He started as the bell captain at the Rancho Las Palmas Resort in Rancho Mirage, California, moving on to manage the front desk, housekeeping, and food and beverage. Fuerstman became assistant general manager at one of Marriott's Long Island properties before then moving to Marriott's then flagship property, the Desert Springs in Palm Desert, California. In addition to being on the opening team of Desert Springs, Fuerstman was responsible for opening several other Marriott properties during his tenure.

After leaving Marriott International, Fuerstman joined ITT Sheraton at the El Conquistador Resort and Country Club in Tucson, Arizona, where he was the resort's general manager. He moved on with ITT Sheraton where he was president and managing director of The Phoenician resort in Scottsdale, Arizona. With ITT Sheraton, he was also responsible for its luxury collection properties that included St. Regis Aspen and St. Regis Houston, as well as all of its properties in the state of Arizona. He was named the company's General Manager of the Year in 1993, with The Phoenician being named the company's hotel of the year while under his direction. In 1998, Fuerstman was recruited by Steve Wynn to open the Bellagio Casino & Resort in Las Vegas, Nevada, as the hotel's vice president of hotel operations. During his time at the Bellagio, it became the first in Las Vegas to receive AAA Auto Club's five diamond rating.

Fuerstman left the Bellagio in 2000 and formed his own management company, Montage Hotels & Resorts, to develop luxury hotels. He described the company as an opportunity to break into the world of luxury hotels dominated by Ritz-Carlton and Four Seasons. His first hotel was Montage in Laguna Beach in 2002. The hotel was a development of Marriott International who sold its stake to Fuerstman's company, the original developer of the 260-room hotel, for $190 million. The price was the highest per-room price paid for a hotel in the United States that year and double the highest price paid in California for the previous year. It was rated a Forbes 5 star hotel with a 5 star restaurant, as well as being the first to receive a Forbes 5 star spa rating. Fuerstman grew Montage Hotels into 5 properties by 2014, namely two in California, one in Utah, one in South Carolina, and one in Hawaii.

== Awards and recognition ==
Fuerstman was awarded the 2007 Resort Executive of the Year, an award decided by leaders in the industry. In addition to being named "One to Watch" by Virtuoso for their Best of the Best Hotel Awards, Fuerstman was listed on the Haute 100 list in 2011. He received a Smart Business Award in the Real Estate & Hospitality category in 2013, the same year that he received the Ernst & Young Entrepreneur of the Year Award. In 2014 he was given the Mondavi Wine & Food Award.

== Personal life ==
Fuerstman is married to Susan J. Fuerstman and has four children. He has been on the board of trustees of Gettysburg College since 2006. He also serves on the advisory board for the Northern Arizona University School of Hotel and Restaurant Management.
