= New Milford, New Jersey =

Borough in Bergen County, New Jersey, US

- Borough
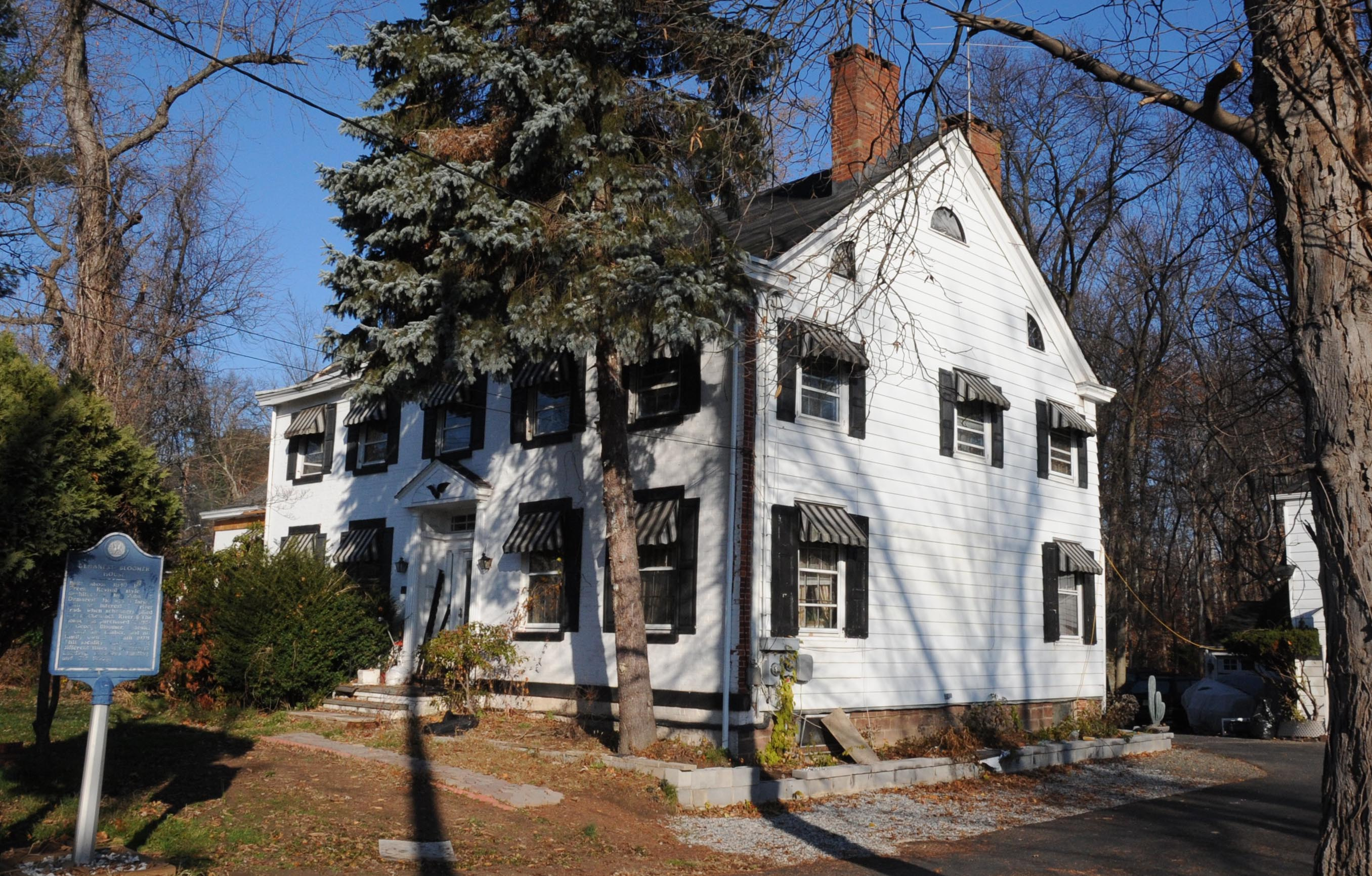
- Demarest-Bloomer House

- Seal
- Nickname: The Birthplace of Bergen County
- Location of New Milford in Bergen County highlighted in red (left). Inset map: Location of Bergen County in New Jersey highlighted in orange (right).

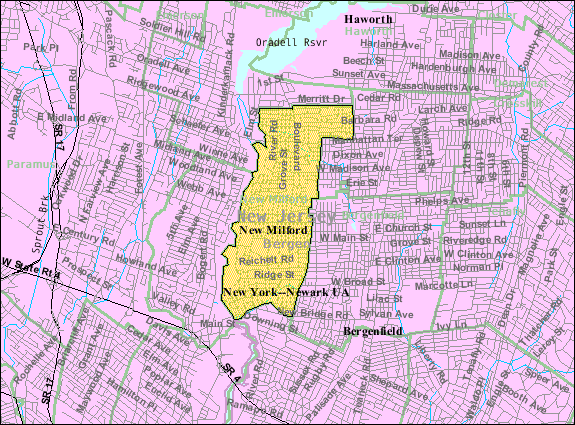
- Census Bureau map of New Milford, New Jersey

- Location in Bergen County Location in New Jersey Location in the United States
- Coordinates: 40.934161°N 74.019453°W
- Country: United States
- State: New Jersey
- County: Bergen
- Incorporated: March 11, 1922

Government
  - Type: Borough
  - Body: Borough Council
  - Mayor: Michael J. Putrino (D, term ends December 31, 2026)
  - Administrator / Municipal clerk: Christine Demiris

Area
  - Total: 2.32 sq mi (6.02 km^{2})
  - Land: 2.28 sq mi (5.91 km^{2})
  - Water: 0.042 sq mi (0.11 km^{2}) 1.77%
  - Rank: 387th of 565 in state 42nd of 70 in county
- Elevation: 30 ft (9.1 m)

Population (2020)
  - Total: 16,923
  - Estimate (2023): 16,889
  - Rank: 159th of 565 in state 18th of 70 in county
  - Density: 7,412.9/sq mi (2,862.1/km^{2})
  - Rank: 62nd of 565 in state 19th of 70 in county
- Time zone: UTC−05:00 (Eastern (EST))
  - Summer (DST): UTC−04:00 (Eastern (EDT))
- ZIP Code: 07646
- Area code: 201
- FIPS code: 3400351660
- GNIS feature ID: 0885320
- Website: www.newmilfordnj.gov

New Milford is a borough in Bergen County, in the U.S. state of New Jersey. As of the 2020 United States census, the borough's population was 16,923, an increase of 582 (+3.6%) from the 2010 census count of 16,341, which in turn reflected a decline of 59 (−0.4%) from the 16,400 counted in the 2000 census.

New Milford was authorized to be incorporated as a borough on March 11, 1922, from what remained of Palisades Township, subject to approval in a referendum (which took place on April 18, 1922). With the creation of New Milford, Palisades Township (which had been created in 1871) was dissolved. The borough is believed to have been named for Milford, Pennsylvania.

== Geography ==
According to the United States Census Bureau, the borough had a total area of 2.32 square miles (6.02 km^{2}), including 2.28 square miles (5.91 km^{2}) of land and 0.04 square miles (0.11 km^{2}) of water (1.77%).

The borough borders the Bergen County municipalities of Bergenfield, Dumont, Oradell, River Edge and Teaneck.

New Milford—together with River Edge and Teaneck—is home to historic New Bridge Landing.

New Bridge, Old Bridge and Peetzburgh are unincorporated communities located within New Milford.

During Hurricane Irene on August 28, 2011, the Hackensack River crested at 11.84 feet (3.61 m), the second-highest recorded height and almost 6 feet (1.8 m) above flood stage, forcing flooding homes to be evacuated. The record height at the New Milford flood gauge is 12.36 feet (3.77 m) set during a storm on April 16, 2007, and the previous second-highest level of 11.45 feet (3.49 m) had been set during Hurricane Floyd on September 16, 1999.

== Demographics ==
Historical population
Census	Pop.	Note	%±
1900	860		—
1910	1,141		32.7%
1920	3,833		235.9%
1930	2,556		−33.3%
1940	3,215		25.8%
1950	6,006		86.8%
1960	18,810		213.2%
1970	19,149		1.8%
1980	16,876		−11.9%
1990	15,990		−5.3%
2000	16,400		2.6%
2010	16,341		−0.4%
2020	16,923		3.6%
2026 (est.)	17,004		0.5%
Population sources: 1900–1910; 1910–1930 1900–2020; 2000 2010 2020

=== 2020 census ===
As of the 2020 census, New Milford had a population of 16,923. The median age was 41.5 years. 19.8% of residents were under the age of 18 and 17.4% of residents were 65 years of age or older. For every 100 females there were 95.1 males, and for every 100 females age 18 and over there were 93.3 males age 18 and over.

100.0% of residents lived in urban areas, while 0.0% lived in rural areas.

There were 6,276 households in New Milford, of which 30.7% had children under the age of 18 living in them. Of all households, 54.5% were married-couple households, 16.4% were households with a male householder and no spouse or partner present, and 24.8% were households with a female householder and no spouse or partner present. About 25.7% of all households were made up of individuals and 9.9% had someone living alone who was 65 years of age or older.

There were 6,432 housing units, of which 2.4% were vacant. The homeowner vacancy rate was 0.7% and the rental vacancy rate was 2.4%.

Racial composition as of the 2020 census
Race	Number	Percent
White	9,502	56.1%
Black or African American	869	5.1%
American Indian and Alaska Native	41	0.2%
Asian	3,446	20.4%
Native Hawaiian and Other Pacific Islander	0	0.0%
Some other race	1,343	7.9%
Two or more races	1,722	10.2%
Hispanic or Latino (of any race)	3,304	19.5%

The following table shows racial and ethnic composition trends from the 2000, 2010, and 2020 censuses.

New Milford borough, New Jersey – Racial and ethnic composition Note: the US Census treats Hispanic/Latino as an ethnic category. This table excludes Latinos from the racial categories and assigns them to a separate category. Hispanics/Latinos may be of any race.
Race / Ethnicity (NH = Non-Hispanic)	Pop 2000	Pop 2010	Pop 2020	% 2000	% 2010	% 2020
White alone (NH)	12,008	10,160	8,830	73.22%	62.17%	52.18%
Black or African American alone (NH)	396	507	796	2.41%	3.10%	4.70%
Native American or Alaska Native alone (NH)	13	14	6	0.08%	0.09%	0.04%
Asian alone (NH)	2,402	3,163	3,420	14.65%	19.36%	20.21%
Native Hawaiian or Pacific Islander alone (NH)	4	2	0	0.02%	0.01%	0.00%
Other race alone (NH)	12	30	139	0.07%	0.18%	0.82%
Mixed race or Multiracial (NH)	239	238	428	1.46%	1.46%	2.53%
Hispanic or Latino (any race)	1,326	2,227	3,304	8.09%	13.63%	19.52%

=== 2010 census ===
The 2010 United States census counted 16,341 people, 6,141 households, and 4,207 families in the borough. The population density was 7,186.0 per square mile (2,774.5/km^{2}). There were 6,362 housing units at an average density of 2,797.7 per square mile (1,080.2/km^{2}). The racial makeup was 70.51% (11,522) White, 3.72% (608) Black or African American, 0.12% (20) Native American, 19.39% (3,169) Asian, 0.02% (4) Pacific Islander, 3.59% (586) from other races, and 2.64% (432) from two or more races. Hispanic or Latino of any race were 13.63% (2,227) of the population.

Of the 6,141 households, 29.7% had children under the age of 18; 54.6% were married couples living together; 10.2% had a female householder with no husband present and 31.5% were non-families. Of all households, 27.2% were made up of individuals and 9.8% had someone living alone who was 65 years of age or older. The average household size was 2.62 and the average family size was 3.24.

20.8% of the population were under the age of 18, 7.6% from 18 to 24, 26.7% from 25 to 44, 29.0% from 45 to 64, and 15.8% who were 65 years of age or older. The median age was 41.6 years. For every 100 females, the population had 94.1 males. For every 100 females ages 18 and older there were 91.0 males.

The Census Bureau's 2006–2010 American Community Survey showed that (in 2010 inflation-adjusted dollars) median household income was $75,075 (with a margin of error of +/− $9,822) and the median family income was $96,885 (+/− $5,032). Males had a median income of $62,817 (+/− $4,265) versus $51,630 (+/− $2,640) for females. The per capita income for the borough was $37,491 (+/− $2,896). About 2.5% of families and 2.8% of the population were below the poverty line, including 0.3% of those under age 18 and 7.3% of those age 65 or over.

Same-sex couples headed 37 households in 2010, more than double the 16 counted in 2000.

=== 2000 census ===
As of the 2000 census, there were 16,400 people, 6,346 households, and 4,277 families residing in the borough. The population density was 7,099.0 inhabitants per square mile (2,740.9/km^{2}). There were 6,437 housing units at an average density of 2,786.4 per square mile (1,075.8/km^{2}). The racial makeup of the borough was 78.59% White, 2.62% African American, 0.12% Native American, 14.76% Asian, 0.02% Pacific Islander, 1.86% from other races, and 2.04% from two or more races. Hispanic or Latino of any race were 8.09% of the population.

There were 6,346 households, of which 29.2% had children under the age of 18, 55.9% were married couples living together, 8.8% had a female householder with no husband present, and 32.6% were non-families. 28.6% of all households were made up of individuals, and 10.4% had someone living alone who was 65 years of age or older. The average household size was 2.54 and the average family size was 3.18.

In the borough the population was spread out, with 21.4% under the age of 18, 6.0% from 18 to 24, 31.8% from 25 to 44, 23.2% from 45 to 64, and 17.6% who were 65 years of age or older. The median age was 40 years. For every 100 females, there were 92.9 males. For every 100 females age 18 and over, there were 88.4 males.

The median income for a household in the borough was $59,118, and the median income for a family was $77,216. Males had a median income of $46,463 versus $36,987 for females. The per capita income for the borough was $29,064. About 1.7% of families and 3.4% of the population were below the poverty line, including 2.8% of those under age 18 and 6.5% of those age 65 or over.

== Arts and culture ==
Musical groups from the borough include The Fontane Sisters, a musical group that included three sisters.

== Government ==
=== Local government ===
New Milford is governed under the borough form of New Jersey municipal government, which is used in 218 municipalities (of the 564) statewide, making it the most common form of government in New Jersey. The governing body is comprised of the mayor and the borough council, with all positions elected at-large on a partisan basis as part of the November general election. A mayor is elected directly by the voters to a four-year term of office. The borough council includes six members, who are elected to serve three-year terms on a staggered basis, with two seats coming up for election each year in November. The borough form of government used by New Milford is a "weak mayor / strong council" government in which council members act as the legislative body with the mayor presiding at meetings and voting only in the event of a tie. The mayor can veto ordinances subject to an override by a two-thirds majority vote of the council. The mayor makes committee and liaison assignments for council members, and most appointments are made by the mayor with the advice and consent of the council.

As of 2023, the mayor of New Milford is Democratic Michael J. Putrino, whose term of office ends December 31, 2026. Members of the borough council are Council President Frances Randi Duffie (D, 2025), Hedy Grant (D, 2024), Ira S. Grotsky (D, 2023), Lisa Repasky-Sandhusen (D, 2025), Matthew S. Seymour (D, 2023) and Thea Sirocchi-Hurley (D, 2024).

In January 2019, Matthew Seymour was selected from three candidates nominated by the Democratic municipalcommittee to fill the seat expiring in December 2020 that was vacated earlier that month when he took office as mayor.

Democrats took control of the council in the November 2012 general election, as incumbent Austin Ashley won reelection while running mate and former council member Michael Putrino was elected again after having served two previous terms of office. Incumbent Republican Howard Berner and running mate Peter Rebsch, a former council member, fell short.

Celeste Scavetta had been appointed by the Borough Council on January 11, 2011, to fill the vacant seat of Ann Subrizi that expired at the end of 2011 when Subrizi was elected as mayor. Peter Rebsch was appointed in June 2011 to fill the vacant seat of Council President Keith Bachmann, who had resigned from office; Rebsch served until November 2011, when voters chose a candidate to fill the balance of Bachmann's term that expired in 2012.

In the November 2011 general election, Democratic incumbent Randi Duffie and newcomers Austin Ashley and Hedy Grant won seats on the council, unseating incumbent Republicans Peter Rebsch and Celeste Scavetta. After counting absentee ballots, Duffie and Grant won the two three-year council seats, edging Republican Scavetta by 10 votes, and started their terms in January 2012. Ashley defeated Darren Drake by 39 votes for the remaining year on the unexpired term of Ann Subrizzi that had been filled on an interim basis by Peter Rebsch, and took office after the election.

The results of the election held November 2, 2010, were a Republican sweep. Republican challenger Ann Subrizi (2,433 votes) ousted 14-year Democratic incumbent, Frank DeBari (2,120). The Republican challengers for Council defeated both incumbents, with Dominic Colucci (2,328 votes) and Diego Robalino (2,285) unseating Democrats Michael J. Putrino (2,210) and Arthur E. Zeilner (2,115). These result gave the Republicans a 4–1 margin, with Ann Subrizi's seat on the Council left vacant.

=== Federal, state and county representation ===
New Milford is located in the 5th Congressional District and is part of New Jersey's 38th state Legislative District. Prior to the 2011 reapportionment following the 2010 census, New Milford had been in the 39th state legislative district. Prior to the 2010 Census, New Milford had been split between the 5th Congressional District and the 9th Congressional District, a change made by the New Jersey Redistricting Commission that took effect in January 2013, based on the results of the November 2012 general elections.

For the 119th United States Congress, New Jersey's 5th congressional district is represented by Josh Gottheimer (D, Wyckoff). New Jersey is represented in the United States Senate by Democrats Cory Booker (Newark, term ends 2027) and Andy Kim (Moorestown, term ends 2031).

For the 2026–2027 session, the 38th legislative district of the New Jersey Legislature is represented in the State Senate by Joseph Lagana (D, Paramus) and in the General Assembly by Lisa Swain (D, Fair Lawn) and Chris Tully (D, Bergenfield).

Bergen County is governed by a directly elected County Executive, with legislative functions performed by a Board of County Commissioners comprised of seven members who are elected at-large to three-year terms in partisan elections on a staggered basis, with either two or three seats coming up for election each November; a Chairman and Vice Chairman are selected from among its seven members at a reorganization meeting held every January. As of 2025, the county executive is James J. Tedesco III (D, Paramus), whose four-year term of office ends December 31, 2026.

Bergen County's Commissioners are Chair Mary J. Amoroso (D, Mahwah, 2025), Vice Chair Steven A. Tanelli (D, North Arlington, 2027), Chair Pro Tem Joan Voss (D, Fort Lee, 2026), Rafael Marte (D, Bergenfield, 2026), Germaine M. Ortiz (D, Emerson, 2025), Thomas J. Sullivan Jr. (D, Montvale, 2025) and Tracy Silna Zur (D, Franklin Lakes, 2027).

Bergen County's elected constitutional officials are Clerk John S. Hogan (D, Northvale, 2026), Sheriff Anthony Cureton (D, Englewood, 2027) and Surrogate Michael R. Dressler (D, Cresskill, 2026).

=== Politics ===
United States presidential election results for New Milford 2024 2020 2016 2012 2008 2004
Year	Republican		Democratic		Third party(ies)	
Year	No.	%	No.	%	No.	%
2024	4,033	48.86%	4,113	49.83%	108	1.31%
2020	3,990	43.30%	5,111	55.46%	114	1.24%
2016	3,463	45.05%	3,975	51.71%	249	3.24%
2012	3,036	44.15%	3,780	54.97%	61	0.89%
2008	3,448	44.97%	4,152	54.15%	68	0.89%
2004	3,574	47.90%	3,838	51.43%	50	0.67%

As of March 2011, there were a total of 9,355 registered voters in New Milford, of which 2,787 (29.8% vs. 31.7% countywide) were registered as Democrats, 1,636 (17.5% vs. 21.1%) were registered as Republicans and 4,928 (52.7% vs. 47.1%) were registered as Unaffiliated. There were 4 voters registered as Libertarians or Greens. Among the borough's 2010 Census population, 57.2% (vs. 57.1% in Bergen County) were registered to vote, including 72.3% of those ages 18 and over (vs. 73.7% countywide).

In the 2016 presidential election, Democrat Hillary Clinton received 3,975 votes (51.4% vs. 54.2% countywide), ahead of Republican Donald Trump with 3,463 votes (44.8% vs. 41.1%) and other candidates with 299 votes (3.9% vs. 4.6%), among the 7,812 ballots cast by the borough's 10,556 registered voters, for a turnout of 74.0% (vs. 72.5% in Bergen County). In the 2012 presidential election, Democrat Barack Obama received 3,780 votes (54.5% vs. 54.8% countywide), ahead of Republican Mitt Romney with 3,036 votes (43.8% vs. 43.5%) and other candidates with 61 votes (0.9% vs. 0.9%), among the 6,932 ballots cast by the borough's 9,892 registered voters, for a turnout of 70.1% (vs. 70.4% in Bergen County). In the 2008 presidential election, Democrat Barack Obama received 4,152 votes (53.6% vs. 53.9% countywide), ahead of Republican John McCain with 3,448 votes (44.5% vs. 44.5%) and other candidates with 68 votes (0.9% vs. 0.8%), among the 7,746 ballots cast by the borough's 9,881 registered voters, for a turnout of 78.4% (vs. 76.8% in Bergen County). In the 2004 presidential election, Democrat John Kerry received 3,838 votes (51.1% vs. 51.7% countywide), ahead of Republican George W. Bush with 3,574 votes (47.6% vs. 47.2%) and other candidates with 50 votes (0.7% vs. 0.7%), among the 7,506 ballots cast by the borough's 9,596 registered voters, for a turnout of 78.2% (vs. 76.9% in the whole county).

Gubernatorial election results for New Milford
Year	Republican		Democratic		Third party(ies)	
Year	No.	%	No.	%	No.	%
2025	2,756	44.55%	3,400	54.96%	30	0.48%
2021	2,347	46.52%	2,671	52.94%	27	0.54%
2017	1,856	45.84%	2,105	51.99%	88	2.17%
2013	2,601	61.40%	1,578	37.25%	57	1.35%
2009	2,223	46.44%	2,306	48.17%	258	5.39%
2005	2,033	42.52%	2,643	55.28%	105	2.20%

In the 2013 gubernatorial election, Republican Chris Christie received 61.4% of the vote (2,601 cast), ahead of Democrat Barbara Buono with 37.3% (1,578 votes), and other candidates with 1.3% (57 votes), among the 4,348 ballots cast by the borough's 9,506 registered voters (112 ballots were spoiled), for a turnout of 45.7%. In the 2009 gubernatorial election, Democrat Jon Corzine received 2,306 ballots cast (47.7% vs. 48.0% countywide), ahead of Republican Chris Christie with 2,223 votes (45.9% vs. 45.8%), Independent Chris Daggett with 227 votes (4.7% vs. 4.7%) and other candidates with 31 votes (0.6% vs. 0.5%), among the 4,838 ballots cast by the borough's 9,615 registered voters, yielding a 50.3% turnout (vs. 50.0% in the county).

United States Senate election results for New Milford1
Year	Republican		Democratic		Third party(ies)	
Year	No.	%	No.	%	No.	%
2024	3,651	46.94%	3,972	51.07%	155	1.99%
2018	2,521	44.49%	2,968	52.38%	177	3.12%
2012	2,672	41.99%	3,603	56.62%	89	1.40%
2006	2,201	45.54%	2,541	52.58%	91	1.88%

United States Senate election results for New Milford2
Year	Republican		Democratic		Third party(ies)	
Year	No.	%	No.	%	No.	%
2020	3,738	41.50%	5,122	56.86%	148	1.64%
2014	1,777	44.51%	2,176	54.51%	39	0.98%
2013	1,179	46.93%	1,309	52.11%	24	0.96%
2008	2,989	42.74%	3,921	56.07%	83	1.19%

== Education ==
The New Milford School District serves students in kindergarten through twelfth grade. As of the 2023–24 school year, the district, comprised of four schools, had an enrollment of 2,037 students and 165.6 classroom teachers (on an FTE basis), for a student–teacher ratio of 12.3:1. Schools in the district (with 2023–24 enrollment data from the National Center for Education Statistics) are Berkley Street School with 434 students in grades K–5, Bertram F. Gibbs Elementary School with 508 students in grades K–5, David E. Owens Middle School with 514 students in grades 6–8 and New Milford High School with 580 students in grades 9–12.

Public school students from the borough, and all of Bergen County, are eligible to attend the secondary education programs offered by the Bergen County Technical Schools, which include the Bergen County Academies in Hackensack, and the Bergen Tech campus in Teterboro or Paramus. The district offers programs on a shared-time or full-time basis, with admission based on a selective application process and tuition covered by the student's home school district.

The Hovnanian School, founded in 1976 and dedicated to helping foster knowledge of Armenian culture and the Armenian language, serves students in preschool through eighth grade.

New Milford is the home of The Art Center of Northern New Jersey, a fine arts school and gallery offering classes for adults and children that was originally established in 1957 in Englewood, New Jersey.

== Transportation ==
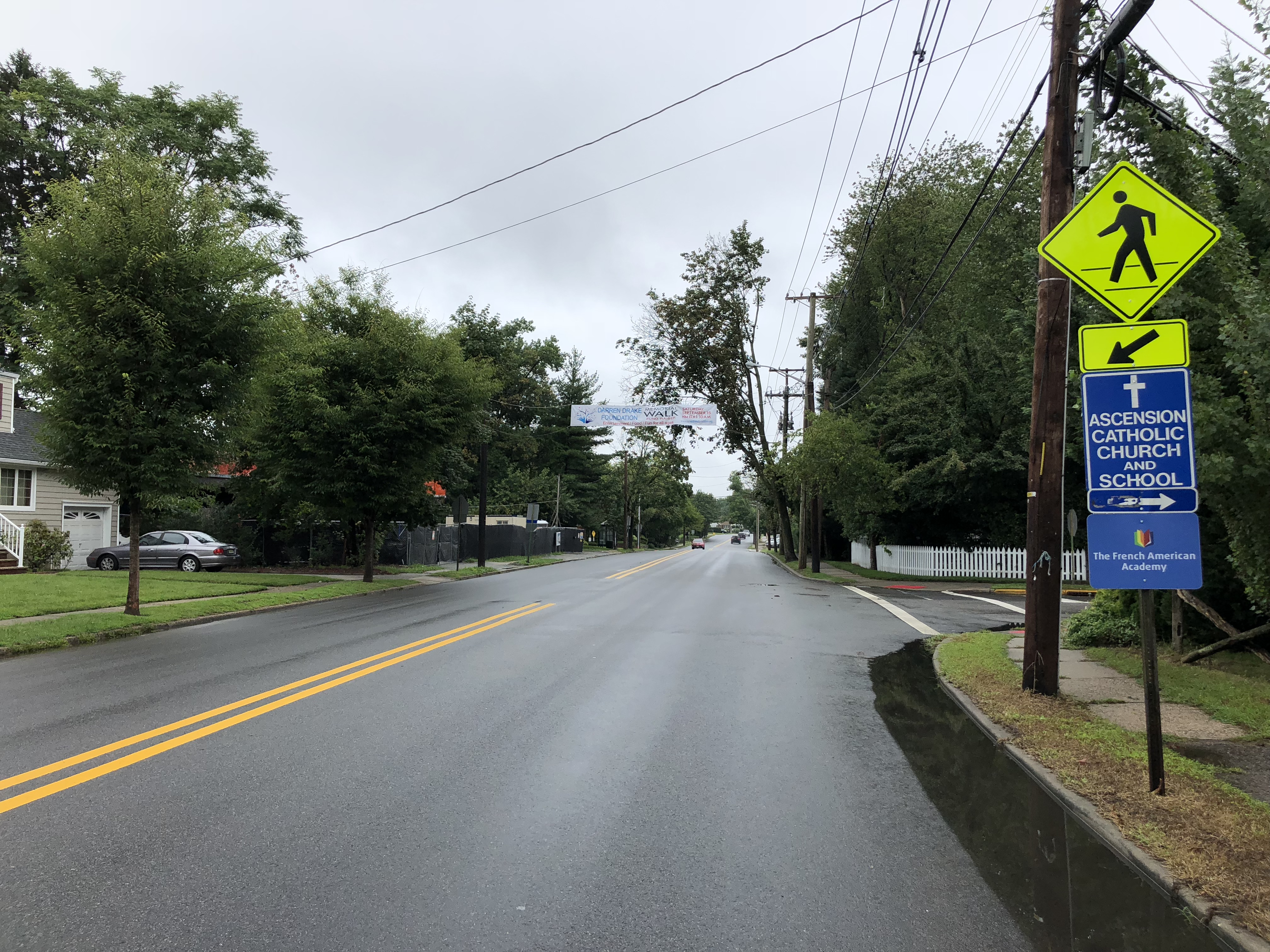
County Route 41 (River Road) in New Milford

=== Roads and highways ===
As of May 2010, the borough had a total of 47.41 miles (76.30 km) of roadways, of which 42.45 miles (68.32 km) were maintained by the municipality and 4.96 miles (7.98 km) by Bergen County.

Main roads in New Milford include the following:

River Road

Madison Avenue

Milford Avenue

Henley Avenue

Boulevard.

=== Public transportation ===
NJ Transit bus route 167 offers service between the borough and the Port Authority Bus Terminal in Midtown Manhattan, with local service offered on the 753, 756, 762, and 772 bus routes through New Milford. Rockland Coaches operates Route 21, which goes between New Milford and 52nd Street in Midtown Manhattan, but the route has not operated since the beginning of the COVID-19 Pandemic.

Commuter rail service is provided by NJ Transit's Pascack Valley Line, with service at River Edge and New Bridge Landing stations, which are available across the Hackensack River in River Edge. The Pascack Valley Line offers two-way weekday and weekend service to and from Hoboken Terminal, and connecting service to Penn Station via Secaucus Junction.

== Notable people ==
People who were born in, residents of, or otherwise closely associated with New Milford include:

- Jack Antonoff (born 1984), guitarist for the band fun
- Rachel Antonoff (born 1981), fashion designer
- Adam Leitman Bailey (born 1970), real estate lawyer involved in cases such as the Park51 controversy (also known as the Ground Zero Mosque), and Trump SoHo
- Mario Bokara (born 1980), professional wrestler best known for his time with Impact Wrestling
- J. Walter Christie (1865–1944), father of the modern tank
- Sherry Coben (1953–2024), writer who created the 1980s situation comedy Kate & Allie
- Josh Dela Cruz (born 1989), actor chosen in 2018 to be the host of Blue's Clues & You!, a reboot of the Nickelodeon series Blue's Clues
- Frank DiMaggio (born 1950), retired Canadian football player who played for the Ottawa Rough Riders
- Mary Joyce Doyle (1923–2016), nun and librarian who founded the library consortium that revolutionized the borrowing of books in Bergen County, New Jersey, through the creation of Bridging Communities, Connecting Library Services
- Jim Dray (born 1986), tight end who has played for the Arizona Cardinals and Cleveland Browns of the National Football League (NFL)
- Pee Wee Erwin (1913–1981), jazz trumpet
- Beth Fowler (born 1940), actress
- Janet Hamill (born 1945), poet and spoken word artist
- Dave Jeser (born 1977), co-creator of Drawn Together
- Chris Mañon (born 2001), professional basketball player for the Los Angeles Lakers of the NBA, on a two-way contract with the South Bay Lakers of the NBA G League
- Ed Marinaro (born 1950), football player and actor
- Rob McClure (born 1982), Theatre World Award-winning and Tony Award-nominated theatrical actor
- John Minko (born 1953), WFAN sports update anchor
- Michael Nelson (born 1949), political scientist, noted for his work on the Presidency and elections
- Quincy Porter, American football wide receiver for the Notre Dame Fighting Irish
- J.J. Racaza (born 1980), marksman who finished 3rd place on History Channel's Top Shot and is a double grandmaster in the USPSA/IPSC
- Joe Regalbuto (born 1949), actor
- Jean Shepherd (1921–1999), writer and narrator of the popular holiday film A Christmas Story
- Bobby Steele (born 1956), guitar player for the Misfits and The Undead
- Robert B. Sturges, Florida businessman and former New Jersey government official
- Robert Torricelli (born 1951), Congressman and Senator from 1983 to 2003
- Jeffrey A. Warsh (born 1960), politician who served two terms in the New Jersey General Assembly and later served as executive director of NJ Transit

== Related reading ==
- Municipal Incorporations of the State of New Jersey (according to Counties) prepared by the Division of Local Government, Department of the Treasury (New Jersey); December 1, 1958.
- Clayton, W. Woodford; and Nelson, William. History of Bergen and Passaic Counties, New Jersey, with Biographical Sketches of Many of its Pioneers and Prominent Men., Philadelphia: Everts and Peck, 1882.
- Harvey, Cornelius Burnham (ed.), Genealogical History of Hudson and Bergen Counties, New Jersey. New York: New Jersey Genealogical Publishing Co., 1900.
- Van Valen, James M. History of Bergen County, New Jersey. New York: New Jersey Publishing and Engraving Co., 1900.
- Westervelt, Frances A. (Frances Augusta), 1858–1942, History of Bergen County, New Jersey, 1630–1923, Lewis Historical Publishing Company, 1923.
