= Montage Hotels & Resorts =

Luxury hotel and resort management company

Montage International
- Type: Private
- Industry: Hospitality
- Founded: 2002
- Founder: Alan Fuerstman (CEO)
- Headquarters: Irvine, California, United States
- Area served: North America
- Services: Hotel and resort management
- Website: www.montagehotels.com

Montage International (or Montage Hotels & Resorts) is a luxury hotel and resort management company founded by Alan Fuerstman and based in Irvine, California. As of 2026, it operates 14 properties in the United States and Mexico, with six of those properties under the Montage Hotels & Resorts brand and eight under its Pendry Hotels and Resorts brand.

== History ==
Montage International was founded in January 2002 by Alan Fuerstman. The first major acquisition by Montage occurred in June 2002 when the company partnered with the Athens Group to purchase a development that was then known as the Laguna Beach Colony. The deal was worth $190 million, which was the highest per-room price for a hotel in the United States that year. Montage Laguna Beach was opened in 2003 and became the first hotel to bear the Montage brand. In March 2005, Montage won a municipal election that allowed them to build a new luxury hotel in the heart of Beverly Hills. Montage Beverly Hills was eventually opened in 2008. That property was later sold to the Maybourne Hotel Group.

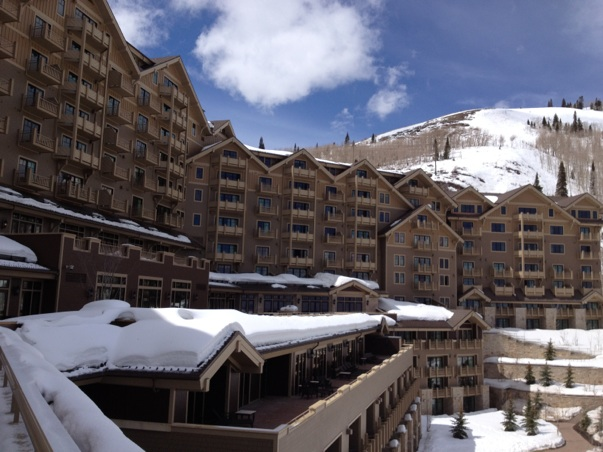
Montage Deer Valley in Park City, Utah. Photo taken in 2012.

Two years later, Montage opened its third resort, Montage Deer Valley in Park City, Utah. Ohana Real Estate Investors — which was created by the founder and chairman of eBay, Pierre Omidyar—provided investment backing for and ownership interest in several Montage Hotels properties, including Laguna Beach, Beverly Hills, and Deer Valley. In August 2013, Montage Hotels & Resorts expanded their portfolio to Hawaii, taking over management of the Kapalua Bay which it managed until 2026, when it was de-flagged and changed to a St. Regis Hotel.

In 2014, Montage acquired management rights to the Inn at Palmetto Bluff in Bluffton, South Carolina. In October 2014, the company launched a new lifestyle brand called Pendry Hotels & Resorts. Pendry is led by Michael Fuerstman (Alan Fuerstman's eldest son) and opened their first Pendry in San Diego's Gaslamp Quarter in February 2017. Construction crews officially broke ground on the hotel on October 8, 2014.

In January 2015, Montage Laguna Beach was sold by Ohana Real Estate Investors to Strategic Hotels & Resorts for $360 million, which is currently the state record for the highest per-room price. Montage Hotels & Resorts continues to manage the hotel. In early 2015, Montage Hotels announced plans for their first international resort hotel in Los Cabos, Mexico on the Santa Maria Bay which officially opened in 2018.

In 2020, Montage purchased Matt Lowe Cay, an island in the Bahamas, with plans to build a resort.

== Properties ==
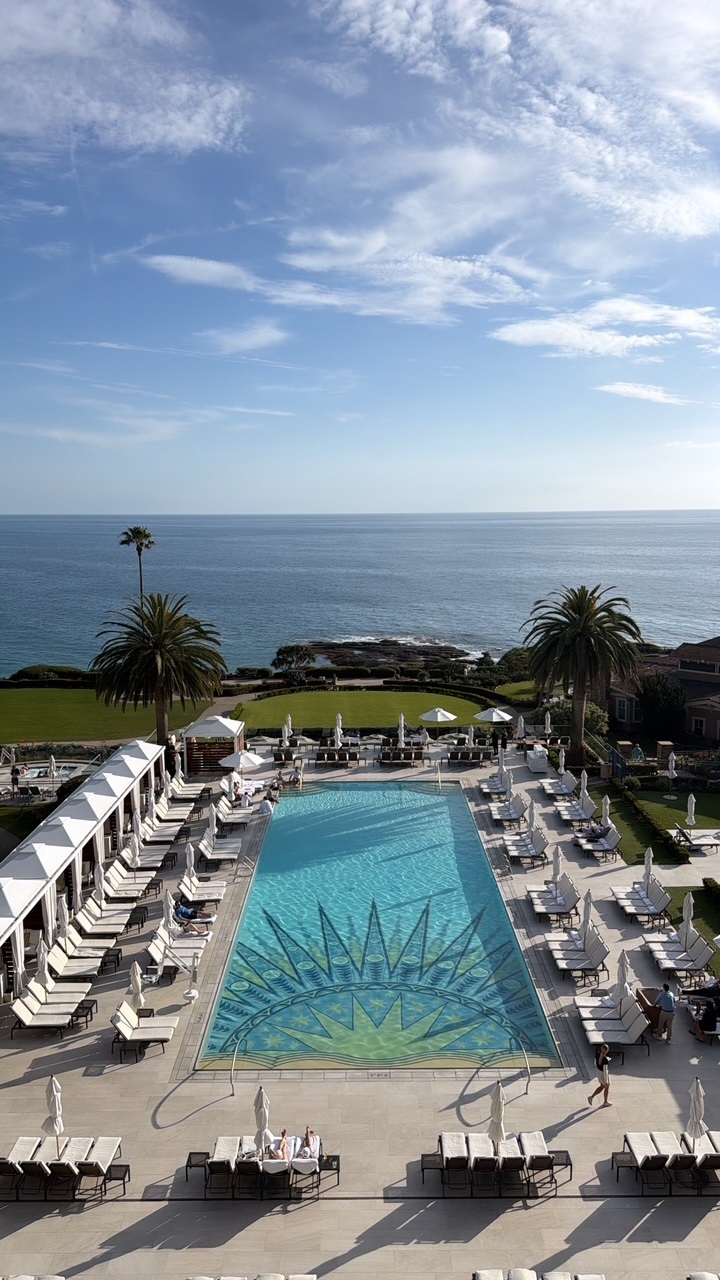
View of the pool at Montage Laguna Beach in 2026.

Montage Hotels & Resorts currently manages fourteen hotels in the United States and Mexico under the Montage brand and Pendry brand. The hotels also have a residential portion which can include single-family homes, condos or villas. Each of the hotels also contain a luxury spa called "Spa Montage," with the spa at Montage Laguna Beach receiving the first ever 5 Star Spa award. As of 2026, it operates 14 properties in the United States and Mexico, with eight of those properties under its Pendry Hotels and Resorts brand.

=== Montage Laguna Beach ===
Montage Resort Laguna Beach

Montage Laguna Beach is the flagship hotel of the Montage Hotels & Resorts brand. The hotel is built in the Craftsman style and is located directly adjacent to the Pacific Ocean and just south of downtown of Laguna Beach. It contains 250 rooms, 60 of which are suites, 37 beach bungalows, and Montage branded residences. It's built on 30 acres and incorporates artwork from William Wendt and Edgar Alwin Payne. Montage Laguna Beach has been in operation since 2003. Montage Laguna Beach was purchased by a Chicago real estate investment trust in 2015 for $360 million. It changed ownership again later in 2015 when the REIT (Strategic Hotels & Resorts) was purchased by The Blackstone Group for $6 billion. It sold again in 2022 to billionaire Tilman Fertitta.

=== Montage Deer Valley ===
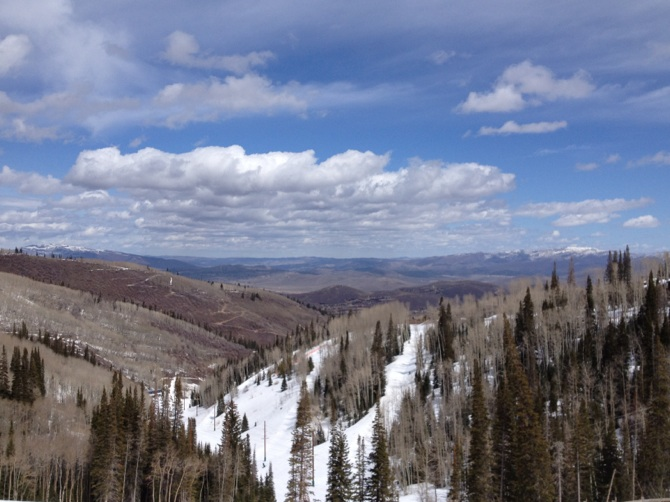
View from Montage Deer Valley.

Montage Deer Valley was opened in 2010 in Park City, Utah. It contains 154 guest rooms, 66 suites and 81 Montage branded residences. The resort contains indoor and outdoor meeting spaces, a ski shop, Compass Sports, a spa, a bowling alley, and four restaurants.

=== Montage Palmetto Bluff ===
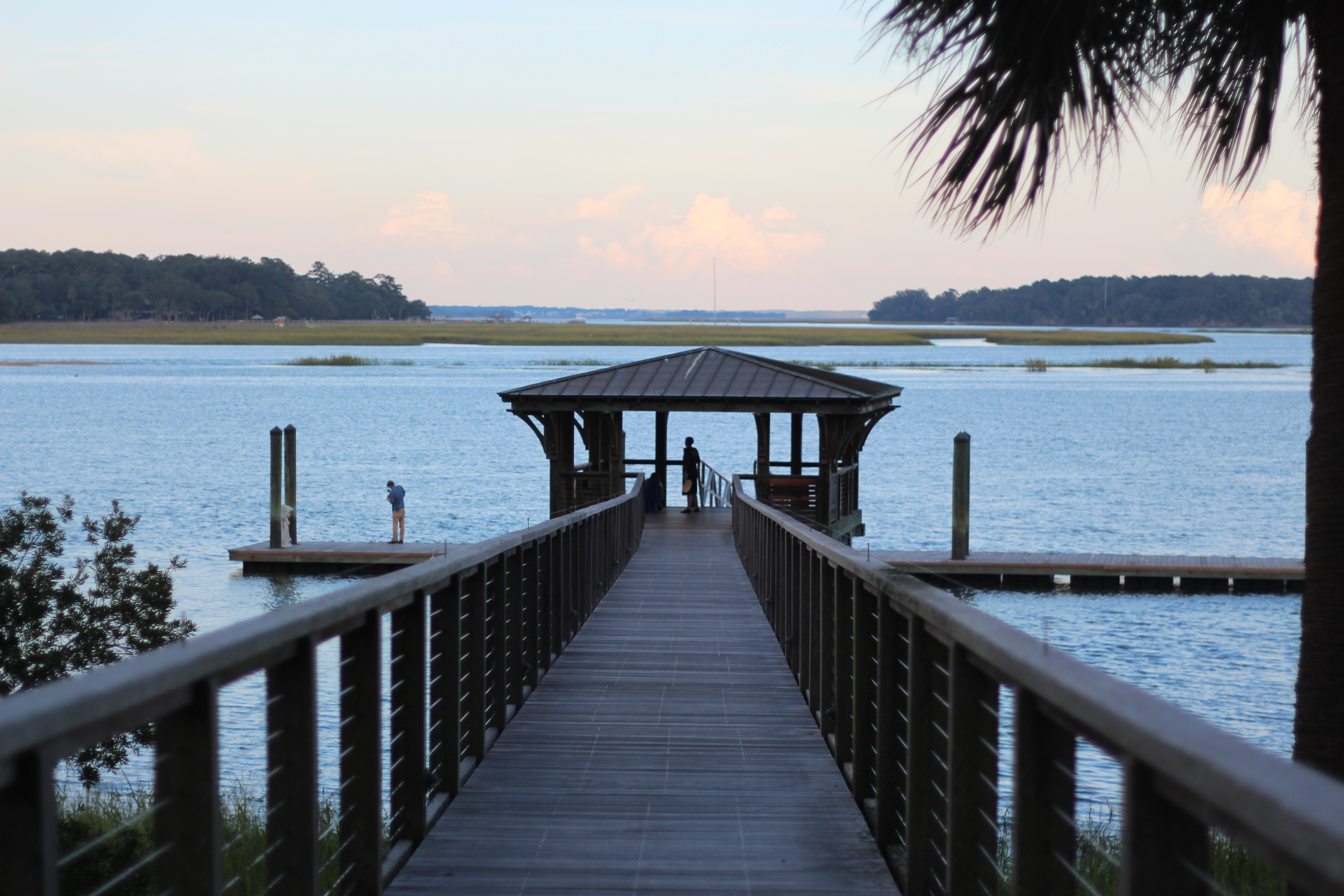
Palmetto Bluff, 2017

Montage Palmetto Bluff came under the management of Montage Hotels & Resorts in 2014. It renovated the property to include 150 new luxury rooms in addition to the already existent 50 cottages. Montage also introduced a new spa, fitness center, and dining accommodations. Montage Palmetto Bluff is located in Bluffton, South Carolina on the banks of the May River.

=== Montage Healdsburg ===
Montage Healdsburg opened in December of 2020. Located in the center of California's wine country, Montage Healdsburg is a "refined wine country retreat." With 130 bungalow-style rooms and 40 residences for sale, Montage Healdsburg is cementing itself as a must-stay destination for those looking for an ultra-luxury experience.

=== Montage Los Cabos ===
Montage Los Cabo is located in Cabo San Lucas and opened in 2018. It includes a 122 room resort along with 52 residences and is listed as a AAA Five Diamond award resort.

=== Montage Big Sky ===
Montage Big Sky is located 45 minutes from Yellowstone National Park and has 100 rooms with ski access and private golf course. The property also includes The Inn Residences at Montage Big Sky, luxury residences.

=== Former Properties ===
- Montage Beverly Hills
- Montage Kapalua Bay
