= Northern Valley, New Jersey =

Region of New Jersey, U.S.

Coordinates: 40.96278°N 73.97163°W

Northern Valley is a region of New Jersey, United States, contained within Bergen County. The region consists of fifteen municipalities: Alpine, Bergenfield, Closter, Cresskill, Demarest, Dumont, Englewood, Englewood Cliffs, Harrington Park, Haworth, Northvale, Norwood, Old Tappan, Rockleigh, and Tenafly.

Several area entities are named after the valley:

- Northern Valley Regional High School District serving students from Closter, Demarest, Harrington Park, Haworth, Northvale, Norwood, and Old Tappan. It operates two schools:

- Northern Valley Regional High School at Demarest, serving Closter, Demarest, and Haworth
- Northern Valley Regional High School at Old Tappan, serving Harrington Park, Northvale, Norwood, and Old Tappan with students from Rockleigh attending as part of a sending/receiving relationship

- Northern Valley Suburbanite, a local newspaper (does not serve Bergenfield and Dumont)
- Numerous businesses in the region have Northern Valley in their name

== Geography ==
Northern Valley is physically situated between the Palisades to the east and the Hackensack River to the west. The New Jersey-New York border and Rockland County border it to the north, while the municipalities of Fort Lee, Leonia, and Teaneck border it to the south.

== Education ==
Every municipality in Northern Valley except one has its own public school district up to 8th grade. The exception is Rockleigh, which sends its students to attend Northvale Public Schools as part of a sending/receiving relationship. There are several municipalities that only have K-8 districts and send their students either to a regional high school district or to another district as part of a sending/receiving relationship for grades 9-12. The school districts are as follows:

K-8

- Alpine Public School
- Closter Public Schools
- Demarest Public Schools
- Englewood Cliffs Public Schools
- Harrington Park School District
- Haworth Public Schools
- Northvale Public Schools
- Norwood Public School District
- Old Tappan Public Schools

9-12

- Northern Valley Regional High School District; attended by students from Closter, Demarest, Harrington Park, Haworth, Northvale, Norwood, and Old Tappan, with students from Rockleigh attending as part of a sending/receiving relationship

K-12

- Bergenfield Public Schools
- Cresskill Public Schools
- Dumont Public Schools
- Englewood Public School District; 9-12 students from Englewood Cliffs attend as part of a sending/receiving relationship
- Tenafly Public Schools; 9-12 students from Alpine attend as part of a sending/receiving relationship

Northern Valley is also home to many private schools. The most notable ones are as follows:

- Academy of the Holy Angels, Demarest; an all-girls Catholic school serving grades 9-12
- Dwight-Englewood School, Englewood; a coed college prep school serving grades Pre K-12
