= Old Tappan Public Schools =

School district in Bergen County, New Jersey, US

Address
- 277 Old Tappan Road Old Tappan, Bergen County, New Jersey, 07675; United States
- Coordinates: 41.002592°N 74.010919°W

District information
- Grades: PreK-8
- Superintendent: Danielle M. Da Giau
- Business administrator: Douglas Barrett
- Schools: 2

Students and staff
- Enrollment: 771 (as of 2023–24)
- Faculty: 65.9 FTEs
- Student–teacher ratio: 11.7:1

Other information
- District Factor Group: I
- Website: www.oldtappanschools.org
Ind.	Per pupil	District spending	Rank (*)	K-8 average	%± vs. average
1A	Total Spending	$18,527	61	$18,891	−1.9%
1	Budgetary Cost	15,670	72	14,159	10.7%
2	Classroom Instruction	9,908	79	8,659	14.4%
6	Support Services	1,922	32	2,167	−11.3%
8	Administrative Cost	1,958	81	1,547	26.6%
10	Operations & Maintenance	1,758	62	1,612	9.1%
13	Extracurricular Activities	125	70	104	20.2%
16	Median Teacher Salary	77,264	81	61,136
Data from NJDoE 2014 Taxpayers' Guide to Education Spending. *Of K-8 districts with more than 750 students. Lowest spending=1; Highest=84

The Old Tappan Public Schools is a comprehensive community public school district serving students in pre-kindergarten through eighth grade from Old Tappan in Bergen County, in the U.S. state of New Jersey.

As of the 2023–24 school year, the district, comprised of two schools, had an enrollment of 771 students and 65.9 classroom teachers (on an FTE basis), for a student–teacher ratio of 11.7:1.

The district had been classified by the New Jersey Department of Education as being in District Factor Group "I", the second-highest of eight groupings. District Factor Groups organize districts statewide to allow comparison by common socioeconomic characteristics of the local districts. From lowest socioeconomic status to highest, the categories are A, B, CD, DE, FG, GH, I and J.

Students in public school for ninth through twelfth grades attend Northern Valley Regional High School at Old Tappan, together with students from Harrington Park, Northvale and Norwood, along with students from Rockleigh who attend the high school as part of a sending/receiving relationship. As of the 2023–24 school year, the high school had an enrollment of 1,068 students and 102.3 classroom teachers (on an FTE basis), for a student–teacher ratio of 10.4:1. The school is one of the two schools of the Northern Valley Regional High School District, which also serves students from the neighboring communities of Closter, Demarest and Haworth at the Northern Valley Regional High School at Demarest.

The district participates in special education programs offered by Region III, one of seven such regional programs in Bergen County. Region III coordinates and develops special education programs for the students in the region with learning disabilities, which also includes the Alpine, Closter, Demarest, Harrington Park, Haworth, Northvale, Norwood and Old Tappan districts, as well as the Northern Valley Regional High School District.

== Schools ==
Schools in the district (with 2023–24 enrollment data from the National Center for Education Statistics) are:

- T. Baldwin Demarest Elementary School with 399 students in grades PreK–4
  - Kathleen Boyce, principal
- Charles DeWolf Middle School with 359 students in grades 5–8
  - Jennifer Santa, principal

== Administration ==
Core members of the district's administration are:

- Danielle M. Da Giau, superintendent
- Douglas Barrett, business administrator and board secretary

== Board of education ==
The district's board of education, comprised of five members, sets policy and oversees the fiscal and educational operation of the district through its administration. As a Type II school district, the board's trustees are elected directly by voters to serve three-year terms of office on a staggered basis, with one or two seats up for election each year held (since 2012) as part of the November general election. The board appoints a superintendent to oversee the district's day-to-day operations and a business administrator to supervise the business functions of the district.
