= Norwood Public School District =

School district in Bergen County, New Jersey, US

Address
- 177 Summit Street Norwood, Bergen County, New Jersey, 07648; United States
- Coordinates: 40.995665°N 73.961315°W

District information
- Grades: PreK-8
- Superintendent: Timothy Gouraige
- Business administrator: Michael Jordan
- Schools: 1

Students and staff
- Enrollment: 611 (as of 2024–25)
- Faculty: 49.0 FTEs
- Student–teacher ratio: 12.5:1

Other information
- District Factor Group: I
- Website: www.wearenorwood.org
Ind.	Per pupil	District spending	Rank (*)	K-8 average	%± vs. average
1A	Total Spending	$17,285	24	$18,891	−8.5%
1	Budgetary Cost	13,871	29	14,159	−2.0%
2	Classroom Instruction	8,365	27	8,659	−3.4%
6	Support Services	2,525	46	2,167	16.5%
8	Administrative Cost	1,367	9	1,547	−11.6%
10	Operations & Maintenance	1,519	30	1,612	−5.8%
13	Extracurricular Activities	95	23	104	−8.7%
16	Median Teacher Salary	63,341	39	61,136
Data from NJDoE 2014 Taxpayers' Guide to Education Spending. *Of K-8 districts with 401-750 students. Lowest spending=1; Highest=64

The Norwood Public School District is a community public school district that serves students in pre-kindergarten through eighth grade from Norwood, in Bergen County, in the U.S. state of New Jersey.

As of the 2024–25 school year, the district, comprised of one school, had an enrollment of 611 students and 49.0 classroom teachers (on an FTE basis), for a student–teacher ratio of 12.5:1.

The district had been classified by the New Jersey Department of Education as being in District Factor Group "I", the second-highest of eight groupings. District Factor Groups organize districts statewide to allow comparison by common socioeconomic characteristics of the local districts. From lowest socioeconomic status to highest, the categories are A, B, CD, DE, FG, GH, I and J.

Students in public school for ninth through twelfth grades attend Northern Valley Regional High School at Old Tappan, together with students from Harrington Park, Northvale and Old Tappan, along with students from Rockleigh who attend the high school as part of a sending/receiving relationship. The school is one of the two schools of the Northern Valley Regional High School District, which also serves students from the neighboring communities of Closter, Demarest and Haworth at the Northern Valley Regional High School at Demarest. As of the 2024–25 school year, the high school had an enrollment of 1,086 students and 106.6 classroom teachers (on an FTE basis), for a student–teacher ratio of 10.2:1. The district participates in special education programs offered by Region III, one of seven such regional programs in Bergen County. Region III coordinates and develops special education programs for the 1,000 students with learning disabilities in the region, which also includes the Alpine, Closter, Demarest, Harrington Park, Haworth, Northvale and Old Tappan districts, as well as the Northern Valley Regional High School District.

== Schools ==
- Norwood Public School served 583 students in grades PreK–8 as of the 2024–25 school year.
  - Kathleen DeRosa, principal for grades PreK–4
  - Steven G. Pellegrino, principal for grades 5–8

== Administration ==
Core members of the district's administration are:

- Timothy Gouraige, superintendent
- Michael Jordan, business administrator and board secretary

== Board of education ==
The district's board of education, comprised of seven members, sets policy and oversees the fiscal and educational operation of the district through its administration. As a Type II school district, the board's trustees are elected directly by voters to serve three-year terms of office on a staggered basis, with either two or three seats up for election each year held (since 2014) as part of the November general election. The board appoints a superintendent to oversee the district's day-to-day operations and a business administrator to supervise the business functions of the district.
