= Harrington Park School District =

School district in Bergen County, New Jersey, US

Address
- 191 Harriot Avenue Harrington Park, Bergen County, New Jersey, 07640; United States
- Coordinates: 40.985656°N 73.98312°W

District information
- Grades: PreK-8
- Superintendent: Sean Conlon
- Business administrator: Bryan Jursca
- Schools: 1

Students and staff
- Enrollment: 645 (as of 2022–23)
- Faculty: 58.7 FTEs
- Student–teacher ratio: 11.0:1

Other information
- District Factor Group: I
- Website: www.hpsd.org
| Ind. | Per pupil | District spending | Rank (*) | K-8 average | %± vs. average |
|---|---|---|---|---|---|
| 1A | Total Spending | $18,481 | 33 | $18,891 | −2.2% |
| 1 | Budgetary Cost | 15,404 | 42 | 14,159 | 8.8% |
| 2 | Classroom Instruction | 9,833 | 51 | 8,659 | 13.6% |
| 6 | Support Services | 2,220 | 32 | 2,167 | 2.4% |
| 8 | Administrative Cost | 1,559 | 20 | 1,547 | 0.8% |
| 10 | Operations & Maintenance | 1,613 | 35 | 1,612 | 0.1% |
| 13 | Extracurricular Activities | 180 | 49 | 104 | 73.1% |
| 16 | Median Teacher Salary | 66,229 | 49 | 61,136 |
Data from NJDoE 2014 Taxpayers' Guide to Education Spending. *Of K-8 districts with 401-750 students. Lowest spending=1; Highest=64

The Harrington Park School District is a community public school district that serves students in pre-kindergarten through eighth grade from Harrington Park, in Bergen County, in the U.S. state of New Jersey.

As of the 2022–23 school year, the district, comprised of one school, had an enrollment of 645 students and 58.7 classroom teachers (on an FTE basis), for a student–teacher ratio of 11.0:1.

The district is classified by the New Jersey Department of Education as being in District Factor Group "I", the second-highest of eight groupings. District Factor Groups organize districts statewide to allow comparison by common socioeconomic characteristics of the local districts. From lowest socioeconomic status to highest, the categories are A, B, CD, DE, FG, GH, I and J.

Students in public school for ninth through twelfth grades attend Northern Valley Regional High School at Old Tappan, together with students from Harrington Park, Northvale, Norwood and Old Tappan along with students from Rockleigh who attend the high school as part of a sending/receiving relationship. It is one of the two schools of the Northern Valley Regional High School District, which also serves students from the neighboring communities of Closter, Demarest and Haworth at the Northern Valley Regional High School at Demarest. During the 1994-96 school years, Northern Valley Regional High School at Old Tappan was awarded the Blue Ribbon School Award of Excellence by the United States Department of Education. As of the 2022–23 school year, the high school had an enrollment of 1,002 students and 106.7 classroom teachers (on an FTE basis), for a student–teacher ratio of 9.4:1. The district participates in special education programs offered by Region III, one of seven such regional programs in Bergen County. Region III coordinates and develops special education programs for the 1,000 students with learning disabilities in the region, which also includes the Alpine, Closter, Demarest, Haworth, Northvale, Norwood and Old Tappan districts, as well as the Northern Valley Regional High School District.

== School ==
- Harrington Park School serves students in grades PreK-8. The school had an enrollment of 616 students as of the 2020–21 school year.
  - Jessica Nitzberg, principal

== Administration ==
Core members of the district's administration are:

- Sean Conlon, superintendent
- Bryan Jursca, business administrator and board secretary

== Board of education ==
The district's board of education, comprised of five members, sets policy and oversees the fiscal and educational operation of the district through its administration. As a Type II school district, the board's trustees are elected directly by voters to serve three-year terms of office on a staggered basis, with either one or two seats up for election each year held (since 2014) as part of the November general election. The board appoints a superintendent to oversee the district's day-to-day operations and a business administrator to supervise the business functions of the district.
