= Northern Valley Regional High School =

Northern Valley Regional High School may refer to one of the following high schools of Northern Valley Regional High School District in Bergen County, New Jersey:

- Northern Valley Regional High School at Demarest
- Northern Valley Regional High School at Old Tappan
