= Haworth Public Schools =

School district in New Jersey, United States

Address
- 205 Valley Road Haworth, Bergen County, New Jersey, 07641; United States
- Coordinates: 40.961156°N 73.98599°W

District information
- Grades: PreK-8
- Superintendent: Paul Wolford
- Business administrator: Kevin Lane
- Schools: 1

Students and staff
- Enrollment: 507 (as of 2024–25)
- Faculty: 55.0 FTEs
- Student–teacher ratio: 9.2:1

Other information
- District Factor Group: I
- Website: haworth.org
Ind.	Per pupil	District spending	Rank (*)	K-8 average	%± vs. average
1A	Total Spending	$20,299	50	$18,891	7.5%
1	Budgetary Cost	18,250	62	14,159	28.9%
2	Classroom Instruction	10,932	59	8,659	26.3%
6	Support Services	3,360	59	2,167	55.1%
8	Administrative Cost	1,800	43	1,547	16.4%
10	Operations & Maintenance	2,047	56	1,612	27.0%
13	Extracurricular Activities	112	29	104	7.7%
16	Median Teacher Salary	76,626	61	61,136
Data from NJDoE 2014 Taxpayers' Guide to Education Spending. *Of K-8 districts with 401-750 students. Lowest spending=1; Highest=64

The Haworth Public Schools are a community public school district, serving students from pre-kindergarten through eighth grade in Haworth, in Bergen County, in the U.S. state of New Jersey.

As of the 2024–25 school year, the district, comprised of one school, had an enrollment of 507 students and 55.0 classroom teachers (on an FTE basis), for a student–teacher ratio of 9.2:1.

Public school students in ninth through twelfth grades attend Northern Valley Regional High School at Demarest in Demarest, which serves students from Closter, Demarest and Haworth. The high school is part of the Northern Valley Regional High School District, which also serves students from Harrington Park, Northvale, Norwood and Old Tappan at Northern Valley Regional High School at Old Tappan. As of the 2024–25 school year, the high school had an enrollment of 1,038 students and 95.4 classroom teachers (on an FTE basis), for a student–teacher ratio of 10.9:1.

The district participates in special education programs offered by Region III, one of seven such regional programs in Bergen County. Region III coordinates and develops special education programs for the 1,000 students with learning disabilities in the region, which also includes the Alpine, Closter, Demarest, Harrington Park, Northvale, Norwood and Old Tappan districts, as well as the Northern Valley Regional High School District.

== History ==
The first school built in Haworth was constructed in April 1894. It was located on Valley Road and Haworth Avenue. The building was yellow. A teacher named Miss Kingsland taught all the students in one room. It burned down on June 2, 1898.

Jennifer Montesano served as the superintendent of Haworth Public School from 2014 until 2018, when she became superintendent of the Secaucus Public Schools.

The district had been classified by the New Jersey Department of Education as being in District Factor Group "I," the second-highest of eight groupings. District Factor Groups organize districts statewide to allow comparison by common socioeconomic characteristics of the local districts. From lowest socioeconomic status to highest, the categories are A, B, CD, DE, FG, GH, I and J.

== School ==
- Haworth Public School serves students in grades PreK-8. The school had an enrollment of 498 students in grades K-8 as of the 2024–25 school year.
  - Adrienne Huettenmoser, principal
- Kevin Lane, middle school principal

== Administration ==
Core members of the district's administration are:

- Paul Wolford, superintendent
- Kevin Lane, business administrator

== Board of education ==
The district's board of education, comprised of seven members, sets policy and oversees the fiscal and educational operation of the district through its administration. As a Type II school district, the board's trustees are elected directly by voters to serve three-year terms of office on a staggered basis, with either two or three seats up for election each year held (since 2012) as part of the November general election. The board appoints a superintendent to oversee the district's day-to-day operations and a business administrator to supervise the business functions of the district.
