= Northvale Public Schools =

School district in Bergen County, New Jersey, US

Northvale Public School

Address
- 441 Tappan Road Northvale, Bergen County, New Jersey, 07647; United States
- Coordinates: 41.01188°N 73.952776°W

District information
- Grades: K-8
- Superintendent: Michael Pinajian
- Business administrator: Louis Turco
- Schools: 1

Students and staff
- Enrollment: 554 (as of 2022–23)
- Faculty: 52.0 FTEs
- Student–teacher ratio: 10.7:1

Other information
- District Factor Group: FG
- Website: www.northvaleschool.org
Ind.	Per pupil	District spending	Rank (*)	K-8 average	%± vs. average
1A	Total Spending	$17,762	27	$18,891	−6.0%
1	Budgetary Cost	15,885	44	14,159	12.2%
2	Classroom Instruction	9,435	44	8,659	9.0%
6	Support Services	2,764	56	2,167	27.5%
8	Administrative Cost	1,985	62	1,547	28.3%
10	Operations & Maintenance	1,509	26	1,612	−6.4%
13	Extracurricular Activities	177	47	104	70.2%
16	Median Teacher Salary	67,500	54	61,136
Data from NJDoE 2014 Taxpayers' Guide to Education Spending. *Of K-8 districts with 401-750 students. Lowest spending=1; Highest=64

The Northvale Public School is a community public school district that serves students in kindergarten through eighth grade from Northvale in Bergen County, in the U.S. state of New Jersey. Students from Rockleigh, a non-operating school district, attend the district as part of a sending/receiving relationship.

As of the 2022–23 school year, the district, comprised of one school, had an enrollment of 554 students and 52.0 classroom teachers (on an FTE basis), for a student–teacher ratio of 10.7:1.

The district is classified by the New Jersey Department of Education as being in District Factor Group "FG", the fourth-highest of eight groupings. District Factor Groups organize districts statewide to allow comparison by common socioeconomic characteristics of the local districts. From lowest socioeconomic status to highest, the categories are A, B, CD, DE, FG, GH, I and J.

Students in public school for ninth through twelfth grades attend Northern Valley Regional High School at Old Tappan, together with students from Harrington Park, Norwood and Old Tappan, along with students from Rockleigh who attend the high school as part of a sending/receiving relationship. The school is one of the two schools of the Northern Valley Regional High School District, which also serves students from the neighboring communities of Closter, Demarest and Haworth at the Northern Valley Regional High School at Demarest. During the 1994-96 school years, Northern Valley Regional High School at Old Tappan was awarded the Blue Ribbon School Award of Excellence by the United States Department of Education. As of the 2020–21 school year, the high school had an enrollment of 1,103 students and 94.6 classroom teachers (on an FTE basis), for a student–teacher ratio of 11.7:1.

The district participates in special education programs offered by Region III, one of seven such regional programs in Bergen County. Region III coordinates and develops special education programs for the 1,000 students with learning disabilities in the region, which also includes the Alpine, Closter, Demarest, Harrington Park, Haworth, Norwood and Old Tappan districts, as well as the Northern Valley Regional High School District.

== History ==
For the 2012-13 school year, Thomas Jefferson School (for grades K-4) and Nathan Hale School (for grades 5-8) were combined to create the Northvale Public School, as part of an effort to reduce costs associated with running two separate schools that share a common campus and corridor.

== Schools ==
Northvale Public School had an enrollment of 519 students in grades K-8 as of the 2020–21 school year.

- Michael Pinajian, principal

== Administration ==
Core members of the district's administration are:

- Michael Pinajian, superintendent
- Louis Turco, business administrator and board secretary

== Board of education ==
The district's board of education, comprised of five members, sets policy and oversees the fiscal and educational operation of the district through its administration. As a Type II school district, the board's trustees are elected directly by voters to serve three-year terms of office on a staggered basis, with either one or two seats up for election each year held (since 2012) as part of the November general election. The board appoints a superintendent to oversee the district's day-to-day operations and a business administrator to supervise the business functions of the district.
