= Demarest Public Schools =

School district in Bergen County, New Jersey, US

Address
- 568 Piermont Road Demarest, Bergen County, New Jersey, 07627; United States
- Coordinates: 40.959269°N 73.960112°W

District information
- Grades: PreK-8
- Superintendent: Michael Fox
- Business administrator: Antoinette Kelly
- Schools: 3

Students and staff
- Enrollment: 714 (as of 2021–22)
- Faculty: 71.7 FTEs
- Student–teacher ratio: 10.0:1

Other information
- District Factor Group: I
- Website: Official website
Ind.	Per pupil	District spending	Rank (*)	K-12 average	%± vs. average
1A	Total Spending	$17,547	27	$18,891	−7.1%
1	Budgetary Cost	14,128	40	14,783	−4.4%
2	Classroom Instruction	8,678	50	8,763	−1.0%
6	Support Services	1,560	3	2,392	−34.8%
8	Administrative Cost	1,746	57	1,485	17.6%
10	Operations & Maintenance	1,764	49	1,783	−1.1%
13	Extracurricular Activities	354	22	268	32.1%
16	Median Teacher Salary	65,460	44	64,043
Data from NJDoE 2014 Taxpayers' Guide to Education Spending. *Of K-12 districts with 1,800-3,500 students. Lowest spending=1; Highest=68

The Demarest Public Schools is a community public school district that serves students in pre-kindergarten through eighth grade from Demarest in Bergen County, in the U.S. state of New Jersey.

As of the 2021–22 school year, the district, comprising three schools, had an enrollment of 714 students and 71.7 classroom teachers (on an FTE basis), for a student–teacher ratio of 10.0:1.

The district had been classified by the New Jersey Department of Education as being in District Factor Group "I", the second-highest of eight groupings. District Factor Groups organize districts statewide to allow comparison by common socioeconomic characteristics of the local districts. From lowest socioeconomic status to highest, the categories were A, B, CD, DE, FG, GH, I and J.

Students in ninth through twelfth grades attend Northern Valley Regional High School at Demarest in Demarest, together with students from Closter and Haworth. The high school is part of the Northern Valley Regional High School District, which also serves students from Harrington Park, Northvale, Norwood and Old Tappan at Northern Valley Regional High School at Old Tappan. During the 1994-96 school years, Northern Valley Regional High School at Demarest was awarded the Blue Ribbon School Award of Excellence by the United States Department of Education. As of the 2021–22 school year, the high school had an enrollment of 974 students and 91.3 classroom teachers (on an FTE basis), for a student–teacher ratio of 10.7:1.

The district participates in special education programs offered by Region III, one of seven such regional programs in Bergen County. Region III coordinates and develops special education programs for the 1,000 students with learning disabilities in the region, which also includes the Alpine, Closter, Harrington Park, Haworth, Northvale, Norwood and Old Tappan districts, as well as the Northern Valley Regional High School District.

== Awards and recognition ==
In 2023, Luther Lee Emerson School was one of nine schools in New Jersey that was recognized as a National Blue Ribbon School by the United States Department of Education.

== Schools ==
Schools in the district (with 2021–22 enrollment data from the National Center for Education Statistics) are:

Elementary schools

- County Road School with 168 students in pre-kindergarten through first grade
  - Frank J. Mazzini, principal
- Luther Lee Emerson School with 217 students in grades 2 - 4
  - Frank J. Mazzini, principal

Middle school

- Demarest Middle School with 320 students in grades 5 through 8
  - Jonathon Regan, principal

The district's PTO provides enrichment for students and afternoon school-age care from school closing to 6 PM; no before-school care is available.

== Administration ==
Core members of the district's administration are:

- Michael Fox, superintendent of schools
- Antoinette Kelly, business administrator and board secretary

== Board of education ==
The district's board of education, comprised of seven members, sets policy and oversees the fiscal and educational operation of the district through its administration. As a Type II school district, the board's trustees are elected directly by voters to serve three-year terms of office on a staggered basis, with either two or three seats up for election each year held (since 2012) as part of the November general election. The board appoints a superintendent to oversee the district's day-to-day operations and a business administrator to supervise the business functions of the district.
