= Closter Public Schools =

School district in Bergen County, New Jersey, US

Address
- 340 Homans Avenue Closter, Bergen County, New Jersey, 07624; United States
- Coordinates: 40.966635°N 73.948541°W

District information
- Grades: Pre-K to 8
- Superintendent: Vincent McHale
- Business administrator: Floro M. Villanueva Jr.
- Schools: 2

Students and staff
- Enrollment: 1,211 (as of 2023–24)
- Faculty: 102.8 FTEs
- Student–teacher ratio: 11.8:1

Other information
- District Factor Group: I
- Website: www.closterschools.org
Ind.	Per pupil	District spending	Rank (*)	K-8 average	%± vs. average
1A	Total Spending	$17,385	46	$18,891	−8.0%
1	Budgetary Cost	14,646	52	14,159	3.4%
2	Classroom Instruction	9,415	68	8,659	8.7%
6	Support Services	2,047	44	2,167	−5.5%
8	Administrative Cost	1,703	59	1,547	10.1%
10	Operations & Maintenance	1,401	29	1,612	−13.1%
13	Extracurricular Activities	78	32	104	−25.0%
16	Median Teacher Salary	85,302	83	61,136
Data from NJDoE 2014 Taxpayers' Guide to Education Spending. *Of K-8 districts with more than 750 students. Lowest spending=1; Highest=84

The Closter Public Schools are a community public school district that educates students in pre-kindergarten through eighth grade from Closter in Bergen County, in the U.S. state of New Jersey.

As of the 2023–24 school year, the district, which comprises two schools, had an enrollment of 1,211 students and 102.8 classroom teachers (on an FTE basis), for a student–teacher ratio of 11.8:1.

The district had been classified by the New Jersey Department of Education as being in District Factor Group "I", the second-highest of eight groupings. District Factor Groups organize districts statewide to allow comparison by common socioeconomic characteristics of the local districts. From lowest socioeconomic status to highest, the categories are A, B, CD, DE, FG, GH, I and J.

Students in ninth through twelfth grades attend Northern Valley Regional High School at Demarest in Demarest, together with students from Demarest and Haworth. The high school is part of the Northern Valley Regional High School District, which also serves students from Harrington Park, Northvale, Norwood and Old Tappan. During the 1994–96 school years, Northern Valley Regional High School at Demarest was awarded the Blue Ribbon School Award of Excellence by the United States Department of Education. As of the 2023–24 school year, the high school had an enrollment of 1,022 students and 95.4 classroom teachers (on an FTE basis), for a student–teacher ratio of 10.7:1.

The district participates in special education programs offered by Region III, one of seven such regional programs in Bergen County. Region III coordinates and develops special education programs for the 1,000 students with learning disabilities in the region, which also includes the Alpine, Demarest, Harrington Park, Haworth, Northvale, Norwood and Old Tappan districts, as well as the Northern Valley Regional High School District.

== History ==
Closter High School opened in 1912 and was closed in 1955 when the district became a constituent municipality in the Northern Valley Regional High School District and students began attending Northern Valley Regional High School at Demarest. The defunct high school became Village Middle School. which operated until 1996.

Hillside Elementary School was awarded the Blue Ribbon School Award of Excellence in 2021.

== Schools ==
Schools in the district (with 2023–24 enrollment data from the National Center for Education Statistics) are:

- Hillside Elementary School with 620 students in grades PreK-4
  - Dianne Smith, principal
- Tenakill Middle School with 570 students in grades 5–8
  - Christine Cipollini, principal

== Administration ==
Core members of the district's administration are:

- Vincent McHale, superintendent
- Floro M. Villanueva Jr., business administrator and board secretary

== Board of education ==
The district's board of education, comprising nine members, sets policy and oversees the fiscal and educational operation of the district through its administration. As a Type II school district, the board's trustees are elected directly by voters to serve three-year terms of office on a staggered basis, with three seats up for election each year held (since 2013) as part of the November general election. The board appoints a superintendent to oversee the district's day-to-day operations and a business administrator to supervise the business functions of the district.
