= Alpine Public School District =

School district in Bergen County, New Jersey, US

Alpine Public School

Address
- 500 Hillside Avenue Alpine, Bergen County, New Jersey, 07620; United States
- Coordinates: 40.942165°N 73.927404°W

District information
- Grades: K-8
- Superintendent: Maureen McCann
- Business administrator: Olga Sico
- Schools: 1

Students and staff
- Enrollment: 169 (as of 2023–24)
- Faculty: 20.1 FTEs
- Student–teacher ratio: 8.4:1

Other information
- District Factor Group: I
- Website: www.alpineschool.org
Ind.	Per pupil	District spending	Rank (*)	K-8 average	%± vs. average
1A	Total Spending	$27,459	67	$18,891	45.4%
1	Budgetary Cost	27,264	70	14,159	92.6%
2	Classroom Instruction	15,488	69	8,659	78.9%
6	Support Services	6,583	71	2,167	203.8%
8	Administrative Cost	1,965	65	1,547	27.0%
10	Operations & Maintenance	2,478	57	1,612	53.7%
13	Extracurricular Activities	703	69	104	576.0%
16	Median Teacher Salary	60,562	47	61,136
Data from NJDoE 2014 Taxpayers' Guide to Education Spending. *Of K-8 districts with up to 400 students. Lowest spending=1; Highest=71

The Alpine Public School District is a community public school district serving students in kindergarten through eighth grade in the Borough of Alpine in Bergen County, in the U.S. state of New Jersey.

As of the 2023–24 school year, the district, comprised of one school, had an enrollment of 169 students and 20.1 classroom teachers (on an FTE basis), for a student–teacher ratio of 8.4:1. In the 2016–17 school year, Alpine had the 33rd smallest enrollment of any school district in the state, with 160 students.

The district had been classified by the New Jersey Department of Education as being in District Factor Group "I", the second-highest of eight groupings. District Factor Groups organize districts statewide to allow comparison by common socioeconomic characteristics of the local districts. From lowest socioeconomic status to highest, the categories are A, B, CD, DE, FG, GH, I and J.

For ninth through twelfth grades, public school students attend Tenafly High School in Tenafly as part of a sending/receiving relationship with the Tenafly Public Schools under which the Alpine district paid tuition of $14,392 per student for the 2011-12 school year. As of the 2023–24 school year, the high school had an enrollment of 1,166 students and 107.3 classroom teachers (on an FTE basis), for a student–teacher ratio of 10.9:1.

The district participates in special education programs offered by Region III, one of nine such regional programs in Bergen County. Region III coordinates and develops special education programs for the 1,000 students with learning disabilities in the region, which also includes the Closter, Demarest, Harrington Park, Haworth, Northvale, Norwood and Old Tappan districts, as well as the Northern Valley Regional High School District.

== History ==
The original school was located on Church Street in what was the old Post Office building which also has been removed and replaced with a new building.

A $5 million construction project completed in 2016 updated the school building originally constructed in 1910, renovating about 4,700 square feet (440 m^{2}) and adding a 10,800-square-foot (1,000 m^{2}) wing that includes a performing arts center. The entire cost of the project was paid for by contributions from residents.

== School ==
As of the 2023–24 school year, the Alpine School had an enrollment of 165 students in grades K-8.

The school colors are green and white and its mascot is the Ram. The old colors were Blue and Yellow. the original mascot was the bulldog.

== Administration ==
Core members of the school's administration are:

- Maureen McCann, superintendent and principal
- Olga Sico, business administrator and board secretary

== Board of education ==
The district's board of education, comprised five members, sets policy and oversees the fiscal and educational operation of the district through its administration. As a Type II school district, the board's trustees are elected directly by voters to serve three-year terms of office on a staggered basis, with one or two seats up for election each year held (since 2012) as part of the November general election. The board appoints a superintendent to oversee the district's day-to-day operations and a business administrator to supervise the business functions of the district.
