= Northern Valley Regional High School District =

School district in Bergen County, New Jersey, US

Address
- 162 Knickerbocker Road Demarest, New Jersey, 07627; United States
- Coordinates: 40.963999°N 73.974245°W

District information
- Grades: 9-12
- Superintendent: James Santana
- Business administrator: Marc Capizzi
- Schools: 3

Students and staff
- Enrollment: 2,159 (as of 2023–24)
- Faculty: 236.1 FTEs
- Student–teacher ratio: 9.1:1

Other information
- District Factor Group: I
- Website: www.nvnet.org
Ind.	Per pupil	District spending	Rank (*)	9-12 average	%± vs. average
1A	Total Spending	$23,170	37	$18,891	22.7%
1	Budgetary Cost	16,730	30	15,592	7.3%
2	Classroom Instruction	9,461	28	8,807	7.4%
6	Support Services	2,612	34	2,294	13.9%
8	Administrative Cost	1,942	42	1,592	22.0%
10	Operations & Maintenance	1,793	17	1,954	−8.2%
13	Extracurricular Activities	900	29	873	3.1%
16	Median Teacher Salary	89,408	47	71,726
Data from NJDoE 2014 Taxpayers' Guide to Education Spending. *Of 9-12 districts with any number of students. Lowest spending=1; Highest=47

The Northern Valley Regional High School District is a comprehensive regional public high school district composed of two public high schools serving students in ninth through twelfth grades from Closter, Demarest, Harrington Park, Haworth, Northvale, Norwood and Old Tappan, suburban communities in Bergen County, in the U.S. state of New Jersey. Students from Rockleigh attend the district as part of a sending/receiving relationship.

As of the 2023–24 school year, the district, comprised of three schools, had an enrollment of 2,159 students and 236.1 classroom teachers (on an FTE basis), for a student–teacher ratio of 9.1:1.

The communities in the district, made up of upper-middle income families, consistently support the school budget, which provides for varied, in-depth college preparatory and career-oriented curricula. Courses range from the remedial to Advanced Placement.

The district participates in special education programs offered by Region III, one of seven such regional programs in Bergen County. Region III coordinates and develops special education programs for the 1,000 students with learning disabilities in the region, which includes the Northern Valley District, as well as those for the Alpine, Closter, Demarest, Harrington Park, Haworth, Northvale, Norwood and Old Tappan districts.

== History ==
The district's first high school facility opened in Demarest in September 1955, before which students from the constituent municipalities attended Closter High School, Dumont High School or Tenafly High School.

After voters rejected a June 1959 referendum that would have raised $3.25 million for construction of the district's second high school in Old Tappan, voters narrowly approved a trimmed-down version of the plan in January 1960 that reduced the cost to $2.9 million (equivalent to $31.6 million in 2025).

The Old Tappan school was opened with 740 students between the 9th and 11th grades in March 1962 to address overcrowding in the district's original school at Demarest that had been holding split sessions before the new school opened. At its establishment, Northern Valley Old Tappan served students from Harrington Park, Northvale, Norwood and Old Tappan, as well as those from the northern portion of Closter.

The district had been classified by the New Jersey Department of Education as being in District Factor Group "I", the second-highest of eight groupings. District Factor Groups organize districts statewide to allow comparison by common socioeconomic characteristics of the local districts. From lowest socioeconomic status to highest, the categories are A, B, CD, DE, FG, GH, I and J.

== Awards, recognition and rankings ==
The district's high schools at Demarest and Old Tappan were respectively the 42nd and 55th-ranked public high schools in New Jersey out of 339 schools statewide in New Jersey Monthly magazine's September 2014 cover story on the state's "Top Public High Schools.

In its "2025 Best School Districts in New Jersey", Niche ranked the Northern Valley Regional High School District as the best school district in the state.

== Extracurricular activities ==
The school faculty support and encourage student participation in the variety of sports, social and academic club activities. In each school, there are over 23 sports, which include participation at the freshman, junior varsity, and varsity level (46 teams) in the Big North Conference and Super Football Conference, as well as 60 co-curricular activities.

=== Radio station ===
The Northern Valley Regional High School district has its own internet radio station, WNVW. The radio station can be accessed through the school's main website, and plays a variety of music in addition to sports, news, and occasional school announcements.

== Schools ==
Schools in the district (with 2023–24 enrollment data from the National Center for Education Statistics) are:

- Northern Valley Regional High School at Demarest served 1,022 students from Closter, Demarest and Haworth.
  - Bruce Sabatini, principal
- Northern Valley Regional High School at Old Tappan served 1,068 students from Harrington Park, Northvale, Norwood, Old Tappan and Rockleigh.
  - Frank Scarafile, interim principal
- Northern Valley Central served 204 students in PreK to 18 years of age. The school, located in Norwood, provides a permanent home for special needs programs offered through the district.

Both of the high schools in the district are accredited by the Middle States Association of Colleges and Schools and by the New Jersey Department of Education.

== Administration ==
Core members of the district's administration are:

- James Santana, superintendent
- Marc Capizzi, business administrator and board secretary

== Board of education ==
The district's board of education, comprised of nine members, sets policy and oversees the fiscal and educational operation of the district through its administration. As a Type II school district, the board's trustees are elected directly by voters to serve three-year terms of office on a staggered basis, with three seats up for election each year held (since 2012) as part of the November general election. The board appoints a superintendent to oversee the district's day-to-day operations and a business administrator to supervise the business functions of the district. Seats on the board of education are allocated based on the population of the constituent municipalities, with two seats each allocated to Closter and Old Tappan, and the other five municipalities each assigned one seat.
