= Rockleigh, New Jersey =

Borough in Bergen County, New Jersey, US

- Borough
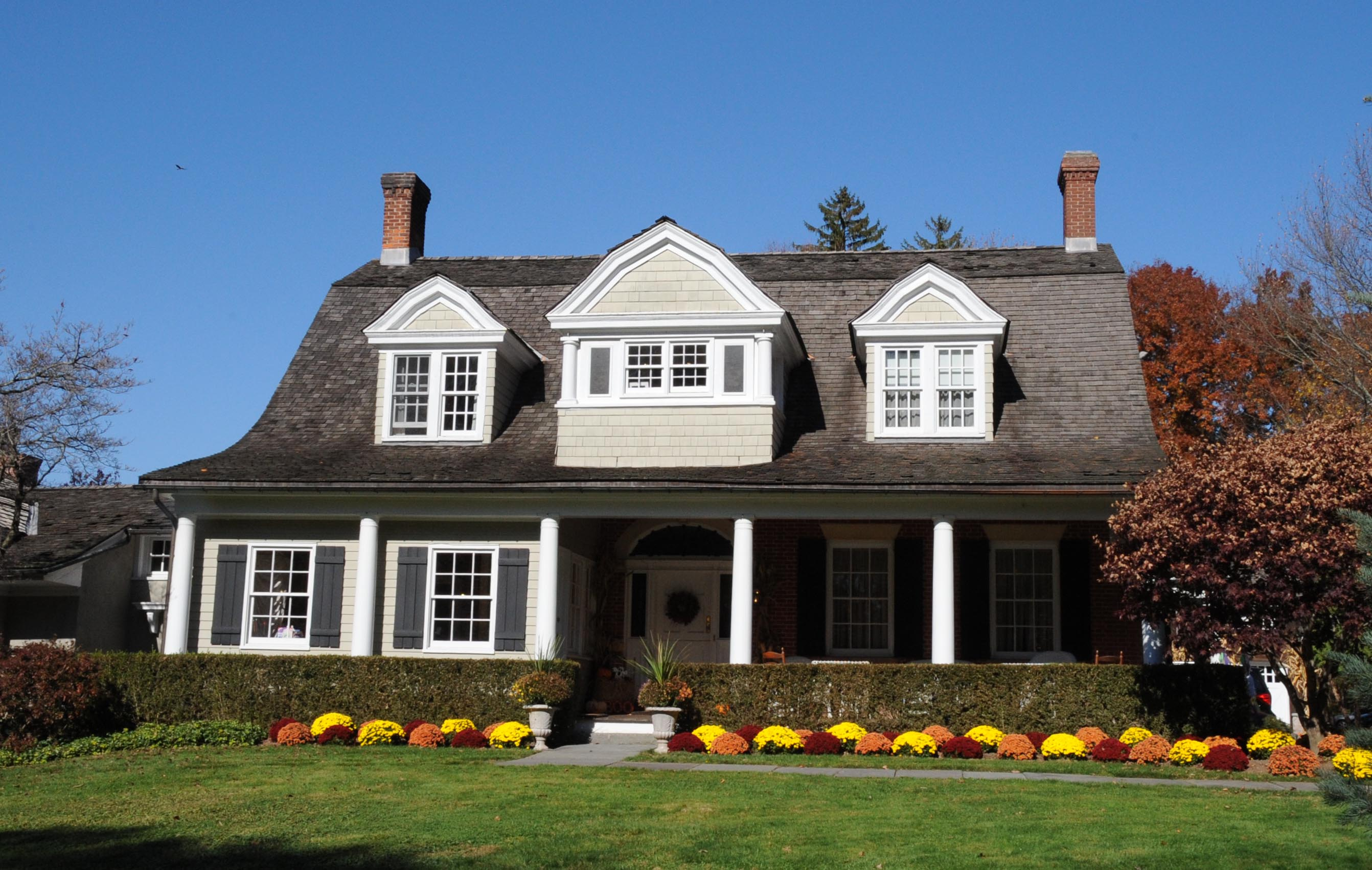
- Haring-Corning House

- Location of Rockleigh in Bergen County highlighted in red (left). Inset map: Location of Bergen County in New Jersey highlighted in orange (right).

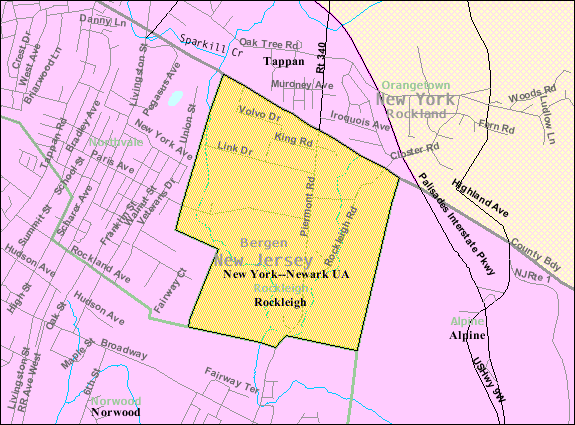
- Census Bureau map of Rockleigh, New Jersey

- Location in Bergen County Location in New Jersey Location in the United States
- Coordinates: 41.000241°N 73.934068°W
- Country: United States
- State: New Jersey
- County: Bergen
- Incorporated: April 10, 1923

Government
  - Type: Borough
  - Body: Borough Council
  - Mayor: James G. Pontone (R, term ends December 31, 2026)
  - Administrator: William J. McGuire
  - Municipal clerk: Marcella Giampiccolo

Area
  - Total: 1.01 sq mi (2.62 km^{2})
  - Land: 1.00 sq mi (2.60 km^{2})
  - Water: 0.0077 sq mi (0.02 km^{2}) 0.69%
  - Rank: 498th of 565 in state 66th of 70 in county
- Elevation: 49 ft (15 m)

Population (2020)
  - Total: 407
  - Estimate (2023): 405
  - Rank: 557th of 565 in state 69th of 70 in county
  - Density: 407/sq mi (157/km^{2})
  - Rank: 458th of 565 in state 68th of 70 in county
- Time zone: UTC−05:00 (Eastern (EST))
  - Summer (DST): UTC−04:00 (Eastern (EDT))
- ZIP Code: 07647
- Area code: 201 exchanges: 750, 767, 768, 784
- FIPS code: 3400364170
- GNIS feature ID: 0885375
- Website: www.rockleighnj.org

Rockleigh (/rɒkliː/; ROCK-lee) is a borough in northeastern Bergen County, in the U.S. state of New Jersey. As of the 2020 United States census, the borough's population was 407, a decrease of 124 (−23.4%) from the 2010 census count of 531, which in turn reflected an increase of 140 (+35.8%) from the 391 counted in the 2000 census. Bordering Alpine, a community ranked America's most expensive ZIP Code by Forbes, Rockleigh has a similar residential character, with large single-family homes on large plots of land.

Rockleigh was incorporated as a borough by an act of the New Jersey Legislature on March 13, 1923 (based on the results of a referendum held on April 10, 1923) from portions of Northvale. The borough was named for a property in Virginia that had been owned by the borough's first mayor.

New Jersey Monthly magazine ranked Rockleigh as its 13th best place to live in its 2008 rankings of the "Best Places To Live" in New Jersey.

== Geography ==
According to the United States Census Bureau, the borough had a total area of 1.01 square miles (2.62 km^{2}), including 1.00 square miles (2.60 km^{2}) of land and 0.01 square miles (0.02 km^{2}) of water (0.69%). Rockleigh is about 25 miles (40 km) from Manhattan in New York City.

The borough borders the municipalities of Alpine, Northvale and Norwood in Bergen County and Tappan in the Town of Orangetown in Rockland County, New York.

== Demographics ==
Historical population
Census	Pop.	Note	%±
1900	32		—
1910	44		37.5%
1920	58		31.8%
1930	86		48.3%
1940	79		−8.1%
1950	110		39.2%
1960	430		290.9%
1970	308		−28.4%
1980	192		−37.7%
1990	270		40.6%
2000	391		44.8%
2010	531		35.8%
2020	407		−23.4%
2023 (est.)	405	▼	−0.5%
Population sources: 1930 1900–2020; 2000 2010 2020

=== 2020 census ===
Rockleigh borough, New Jersey – Racial and ethnic composition Note: the US Census treats Hispanic/Latino as an ethnic category. This table excludes Latinos from the racial categories and assigns them to a separate category. Hispanics/Latinos may be of any race.
Race / Ethnicity (NH = Non-Hispanic)	Pop 2000	Pop 2010	Pop 2020	% 2000	% 2010	% 2020
White alone (NH)	336	487	327	85.93%	91.71%	80.34%
Black or African American alone (NH)	13	10	10	3.32%	1.88%	2.46%
Native American or Alaska Native alone (NH)	1	1	0	0.26%	0.19%	0.00%
Asian alone (NH)	15	8	27	3.84%	1.51%	6.63%
Native Hawaiian or Pacific Islander alone (NH)	0	0	0	0.00%	0.00%	0.00%
Other race alone (NH)	0	0	1	0.00%	0.00%	0.25%
Mixed race or Multiracial (NH)	7	5	9	1.79%	0.94%	2.21%
Hispanic or Latino (any race)	19	20	33	4.86%	3.77%	8.11%
Total	391	531	407	100.00%	100.00%	100.00%

=== 2010 census ===
The 2010 United States census counted 531 people, 75 households, and 58 families in the borough. The population density was 548.1 per square mile (211.6/km^{2}). There were 86 housing units at an average density of 88.8 per square mile (34.3/km^{2}). The racial makeup was 95.10% (505) White, 2.07% (11) Black or African American, 0.19% (1) Native American, 1.51% (8) Asian, 0.00% (0) Pacific Islander, 0.19% (1) from other races, and 0.94% (5) from two or more races. Hispanic or Latino of any race were 3.77% (20) of the population.

Of the 75 households, 32.0% had children under the age of 18; 70.7% were married couples living together; 4.0% had a female householder with no husband present and 22.7% were non-families. Of all households, 13.3% were made up of individuals and 8.0% had someone living alone who was 65 years of age or older. The average household size was 2.92 and the average family size was 3.28.

16.2% of the population were under the age of 18, 2.8% from 18 to 24, 8.9% from 25 to 44, 15.1% from 45 to 64, and 57.1% who were 65 years of age or older. The median age was 73.8 years. For every 100 females, the population had 58.5 males. For every 100 females ages 18 and older there were 47.4 males.

The Census Bureau's 2006–2010 American Community Survey showed that (in 2010 inflation-adjusted dollars) median household income was $137,778 (with a margin of error of +/− $87,096) and the median family income was $139,861 (+/− $77,779). Males had a median income of $76,719 (+/− $48,274) versus $70,3136 (+/− $43,416) for females. The per capita income for the borough was $36,771 (+/− $23,965). About none of families and 3.4% of the population were below the poverty line, including none of those under age 18 and none of those age 65 or over.

Same-sex couples headed none of the borough's households in either 2000 or 2010.

=== 2000 census ===
As of the 2000 United States census there were 391 people, 74 households, and 58 families residing in the borough. The population density was 402.2 inhabitants per square mile (155.3/km^{2}). There were 80 housing units at an average density of 82.3 per square mile (31.8/km^{2}). The racial makeup of the borough was 89.77% White, 3.32% African American, 0.26% Native American, 3.84% Asian, 1.02% from other races, and 1.79% from two or more races. Hispanic or Latino of any race were 4.86% of the population.

There were 74 households, out of which 37.8% had children under the age of 18 living with them, 67.6% were married couples living together, 8.1% had a female householder with no husband present, and 21.6% were non-families. 10.8% of all households were made up of individuals, and 6.8% had someone living alone who was 65 years of age or older. The average household size was 3.04 and the average family size was 3.40.

In the borough the population was spread out, with 26.3% under the age of 18, 4.6% from 18 to 24, 15.6% from 25 to 44, 21.5% from 45 to 64, and 32.0% who were 65 years of age or older. The median age was 49 years. For every 100 females, there were 95.5 males. For every 100 females age 18 and over, there were 68.4 males.

The median income for a household in the borough was $152,262, and the median income for a family was $157,816. Males had a median income of $100,000 versus $66,250 for females. The per capita income for the borough was $48,935. None of the families and 23.1% of the population were living below the poverty line, including no one under eighteen and none of those over 64.

== Economy ==
Corporate residents of Rockleigh include:

- Crestron Electronics, a company that manufactures high-end systems for home automation and conference room control, is headquartered in Rockleigh.
- Volvo Car USA, LLC., a Swedish company that manufactures safety-oriented luxury automobiles, maintains an American headquarters in Rockleigh.

== Government ==
=== Local government ===
Rockleigh is governed under the borough form of New Jersey municipal government, which is used in 218 municipalities (of the 564) statewide, making it the most common form of government in New Jersey. The governing body is comprised of a mayor and a borough council, with all positions elected at-large on a partisan basis as part of the November general election. A mayor is elected directly by the voters to a four-year term of office. The borough council includes six members elected to serve three-year terms on a staggered basis, with two seats coming up for election each year in a three-year cycle. The borough form of government used by Rockleigh is a "weak mayor / strong council" government in which council members act as the legislative body with the mayor presiding at meetings and voting only in the event of a tie. The mayor can veto ordinances subject to an override by a two-thirds majority vote of the council. The mayor makes committee and liaison assignments for council members, and most appointments are made by the mayor with the advice and consent of the council.

As of 2023, the mayor of Rockleigh is Republican James G. Pontone, whose term of office ends December 31, 2026. Members of the Rockleigh Borough Council are Ilana H. Altman (R, 2025), Rosanne Antine (R, 2024), Marilyn A. Bresnak (R, 2024), Frank S. Cumiskey (R, 2023), David C. Hansen (R, 2025) and John Ivan Mender (R, 2024).

In elections held in November 2010, Robert R. Schaffer ran a successful write-in campaign and defeated incumbent mayor Nick Langella by a 2–1 margin. Councilmembers Shirl Ewald and James Pontone were re-elected.

Law enforcement services in Rockleigh are provided under contract by the Northvale Police Department. The borough paid Northvale $325,000 per year for police coverage in 2017.

=== Federal, state and county representation ===
Rockleigh is located in the 5th Congressional District and is part of New Jersey's 39th state legislative district.

For the 119th United States Congress, New Jersey's 5th congressional district is represented by Josh Gottheimer (D, Wyckoff). New Jersey is represented in the United States Senate by Democrats Cory Booker (Newark, term ends 2027) and Andy Kim (Moorestown, term ends 2031).

For the 2026–2027 session, the 39th legislative district of the New Jersey Legislature is represented in the State Senate by Holly Schepisi (R, River Vale) and in the General Assembly by Robert Auth (R, Old Tappan) and John V. Azzariti (R, Saddle River).

Bergen County is governed by a directly elected County Executive, with legislative functions performed by a Board of County Commissioners comprised of seven members who are elected at-large to three-year terms in partisan elections on a staggered basis, with either two or three seats coming up for election each November; a Chairman and Vice Chairman are selected from among its seven members at a reorganization meeting held every January. As of 2025, the county executive is James J. Tedesco III (D, Paramus), whose four-year term of office ends December 31, 2026.

Bergen County's Commissioners are Chair Mary J. Amoroso (D, Mahwah, 2025), Vice Chair Steven A. Tanelli (D, North Arlington, 2027), Chair Pro Tem Joan Voss (D, Fort Lee, 2026), Rafael Marte (D, Bergenfield, 2026), Germaine M. Ortiz (D, Emerson, 2025), Thomas J. Sullivan Jr. (D, Montvale, 2025) and Tracy Silna Zur (D, Franklin Lakes, 2027).

Bergen County's elected constitutional officials are Clerk John S. Hogan (D, Northvale, 2026), Sheriff Anthony Cureton (D, Englewood, 2027) and Surrogate Michael R. Dressler (D, Cresskill, 2026).

=== Politics ===
United States presidential election results for Rockleigh 2024 2020 2016 2012 2008 2004
Year	Republican		Democratic		Third party(ies)	
Year	No.	%	No.	%	No.	%
2024	99	58.24%	68	40.00%	3	1.76%
2020	116	56.04%	89	43.00%	2	0.97%
2016	89	54.94%	68	41.98%	5	3.09%
2012	89	53.61%	76	45.78%	1	0.60%
2008	97	50.52%	95	49.48%	0	0.00%
2004	96	48.73%	100	50.76%	1	0.51%

As of March 2011, there were a total of 229 registered voters in Rockleigh, of which 59 (25.8% vs. 31.7% countywide) were registered as Democrats, 70 (30.6% vs. 21.1%) were registered as Republicans and 99 (43.2% vs. 47.1%) were registered as Unaffiliated. There was one voter registered to another party. Among the borough's 2010 Census population, 43.1% (vs. 57.1% in Bergen County) were registered to vote, including 51.5% of those ages 18 and over (vs. 73.7% countywide).

In the 2016 presidential election, Republican Donald Trump received 89 votes (53.3% vs. 41.6% countywide), ahead of Democrat Hillary Clinton with 68 votes (40.7% vs. 54.8%) and other candidates with 5 votes (3.0% vs. 3.0%), among the 167 ballots cast by the borough's 256 registered voters, for a turnout of 65.2% (vs. 72.5% in Bergen County). In the 2012 presidential election, Republican Mitt Romney received 89 votes (53.6% vs. 43.5% countywide), ahead of Democrat Barack Obama with 76 votes (45.8% vs. 54.8%) and other candidates with one vote (0.6% vs. 0.9%), among the 166 ballots cast by the borough's 260 registered voters, for a turnout of 63.8% (vs. 70.4% in Bergen County). In the 2008 presidential election, Republican John McCain received 97 votes (49.2% vs. 44.5% countywide), ahead of Democrat Barack Obama with 95 votes (48.2% vs. 53.9%) and other candidates with votes (0.0% vs. 0.8%), among the 197 ballots cast by the borough's 281 registered voters, for a turnout of 70.1% (vs. 76.8% in Bergen County).

Gubernatorial election results for Rockleigh
Year	Republican		Democratic		Third party(ies)	
Year	No.	%	No.	%	No.	%
2025	90	69.23%	40	30.77%	0	0.00%
2021	88	67.69%	41	31.54%	1	0.77%
2017	57	72.15%	19	24.05%	3	3.80%
2013	75	61.98%	15	12.40%	31	25.62%
2009	70	55.56%	51	40.48%	5	3.97%
2005	72	55.81%	57	44.19%	0	0.00%

In the 2013 gubernatorial election, Republican Chris Christie received 62.0% of the vote (75 cast), ahead of Democrat Barbara Buono with 12.4% (15 votes), and other candidates with 25.6% (31 votes), among the 92 ballots cast by the borough's 238 registered voters for a turnout of 38.7%. In the 2009 gubernatorial election, Republican Chris Christie received 70 votes (55.6% vs. 45.8% countywide), ahead of Democrat Jon Corzine with 51 votes (40.5% vs. 48.0%), Independent Chris Daggett with 5 votes (4.0% vs. 4.7%) and other candidates with no votes (0.0% vs. 0.5%), among the 126 ballots cast by the borough's 258 registered voters, yielding a 48.8% turnout (vs. 50.0% in the county).

United States Senate election results for Rockleigh1
Year	Republican		Democratic		Third party(ies)	
Year	No.	%	No.	%	No.	%
2024	92	56.79%	63	38.89%	7	4.32%
2018	76	65.52%	39	33.62%	1	0.86%
2012	84	53.16%	71	44.94%	3	1.90%
2006	68	53.54%	59	46.46%	0	0.00%

United States Senate election results for Rockleigh2
Year	Republican		Democratic		Third party(ies)	
Year	No.	%	No.	%	No.	%
2020	109	54.23%	91	45.27%	1	0.50%
2014	69	73.40%	23	24.47%	2	2.13%
2013	43	67.19%	20	31.25%	1	1.56%
2008	88	50.29%	86	49.14%	1	0.57%

== Education ==
Students from Rockleigh, a non-operating school district, attend the Northvale Public Schools in the Borough of Northvale as part of a sending/receiving relationship. As of the 2020–21 school year, the district, comprised of one school, had an enrollment of 545 students and 48.5 classroom teachers (on an FTE basis), for a student–teacher ratio of 11.2:1. The Rockleigh Borough Board of Education is a five-member board with the members appointed by the mayor since 2005. The district's last elected term expired in 2007 at which time the board consisted entirely of mayoral appointees.

Students in public school for ninth through twelfth grades attend Northern Valley Regional High School at Old Tappan, together with students from Harrington Park, Northvale, Norwood and Old Tappan, with students from Rockleigh attending the high school as part of a sending/receiving relationship. The school is one of the two schools of the Northern Valley Regional High School District, which also serves students from the neighboring communities of Closter, Demarest, Haworth at the Northern Valley Regional High School at Demarest. During the 1994–1996 school years, Northern Valley Regional High School at Old Tappan was awarded the Blue Ribbon School Award of Excellence by the United States Department of Education. As of the 2020–21 school year, the high school had an enrollment of 1,103 students and 94.6 classroom teachers (on an FTE basis), for a student–teacher ratio of 11.7:1.

Public school students from the borough, and all of Bergen County, are eligible to attend the secondary education programs offered by the Bergen County Technical Schools, which include the Bergen County Academies in Hackensack, and the Bergen Tech campus in Teterboro or Paramus. The district offers programs on a shared-time or full-time basis, with admission based on a selective application process and tuition covered by the student's home school district.

== Transportation ==
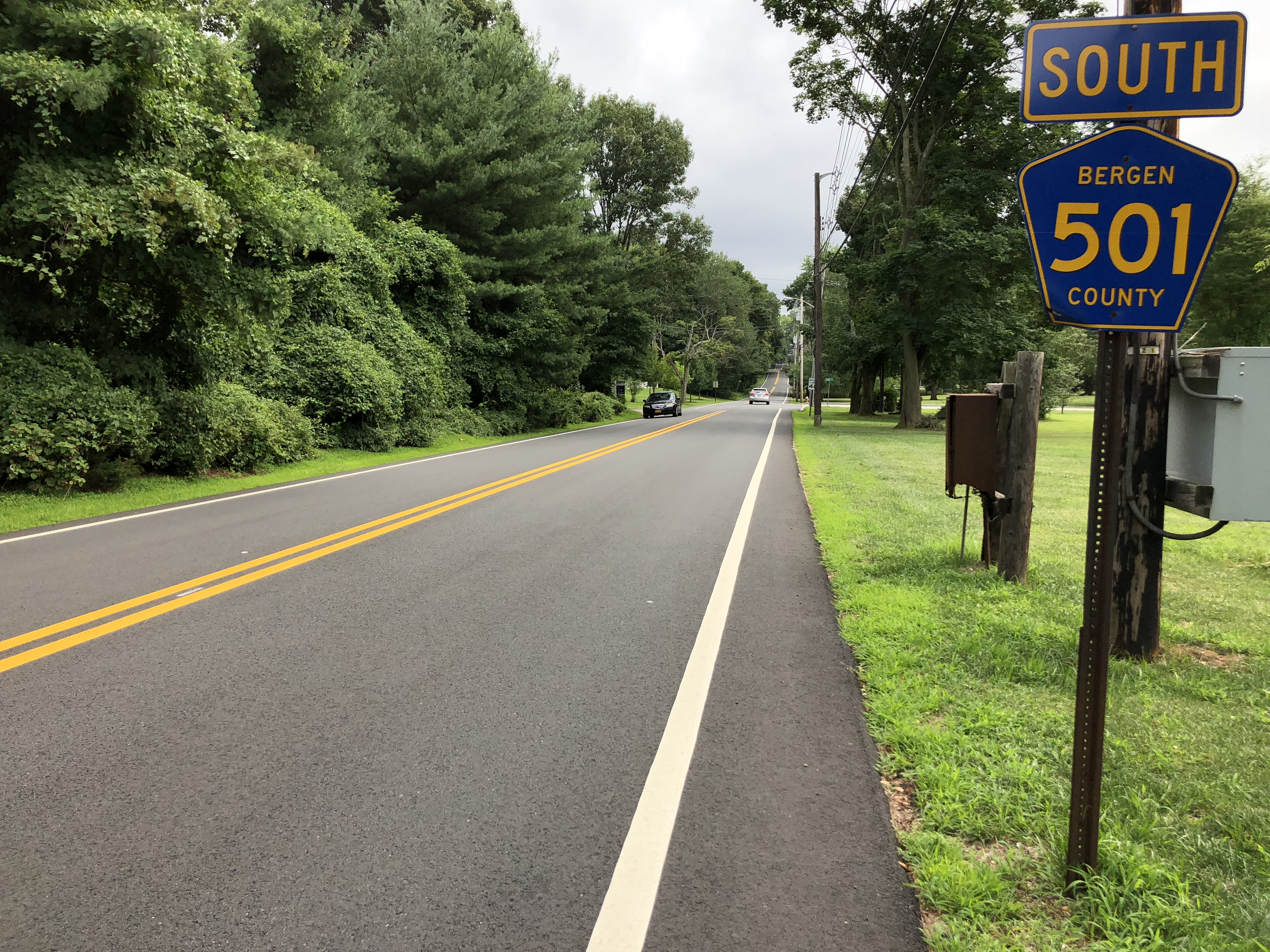
View south at the north end of County Route 501 in Rockleigh

=== Roads and highways ===
As of May 2010, the borough had a total of 4.56 miles (7.34 km) of roadways, of which 2.74 miles (4.41 km) were maintained by the municipality and 1.82 miles (2.93 km) by Bergen County.

County Route 501 passes through Rockleigh. This road's northern terminus is in Rockleigh, where it continues into New York as New York State Route 340.

== Notable people ==
People who were born in, residents of, or otherwise closely associated with Rockleigh include:

- Sidney Altman (1939–2022), a Canadian-American molecular biologist and Nobel laureate, died in Rockleigh
- Frank Cumiskey (1912–2004), gymnast who competed in the 1932 Summer Olympics, in the 1936 Summer Olympics, and in the 1948 Summer Olympics
- Brian Daley (1947–1996), science fiction novelist
- Will Elder (1921–2008), illustrator and comic book artist who worked in numerous areas of commercial art but is best known for a zany cartoon style that helped launch Harvey Kurtzman's Mad comic book in 1952
- Daniel Leo (born 1941), acting boss of the Genovese crime family who was sentenced in 2008 to five years in prison for racketeering and loansharking
- Ada Lunardoni (1911–2003), artistic gymnast who competed at the 1936 Summer Olympics and placed fifth with the team
- Willard Marshall (1921–2000), former MLB right fielder who played for the New York Giants, Boston Braves, Cincinnati Reds and Chicago White Sox
- Hy Weiss (1923–2007), early rock and roll record producer

== Sources ==
- Municipal Incorporations of the State of New Jersey (according to Counties) prepared by the Division of Local Government, Department of the Treasury (New Jersey); December 1, 1958.
- Clayton, W. Woodford; and Nelson, William. History of Bergen and Passaic Counties, New Jersey, with Biographical Sketches of Many of its Pioneers and Prominent Men., Philadelphia: Everts and Peck, 1882.
- Harvey, Cornelius Burnham (ed.), Genealogical History of Hudson and Bergen Counties, New Jersey. New York: New Jersey Genealogical Publishing Co., 1900.
- Van Valen, James M. History of Bergen County, New Jersey. New York: New Jersey Publishing and Engraving Co., 1900.
- Westervelt, Frances A. (Frances Augusta), 1858–1942, History of Bergen County, New Jersey, 1630–1923, Lewis Historical Publishing Company, 1923.
