= Harrington Park, New Jersey =

Borough in Bergen County, New Jersey, US

- Borough
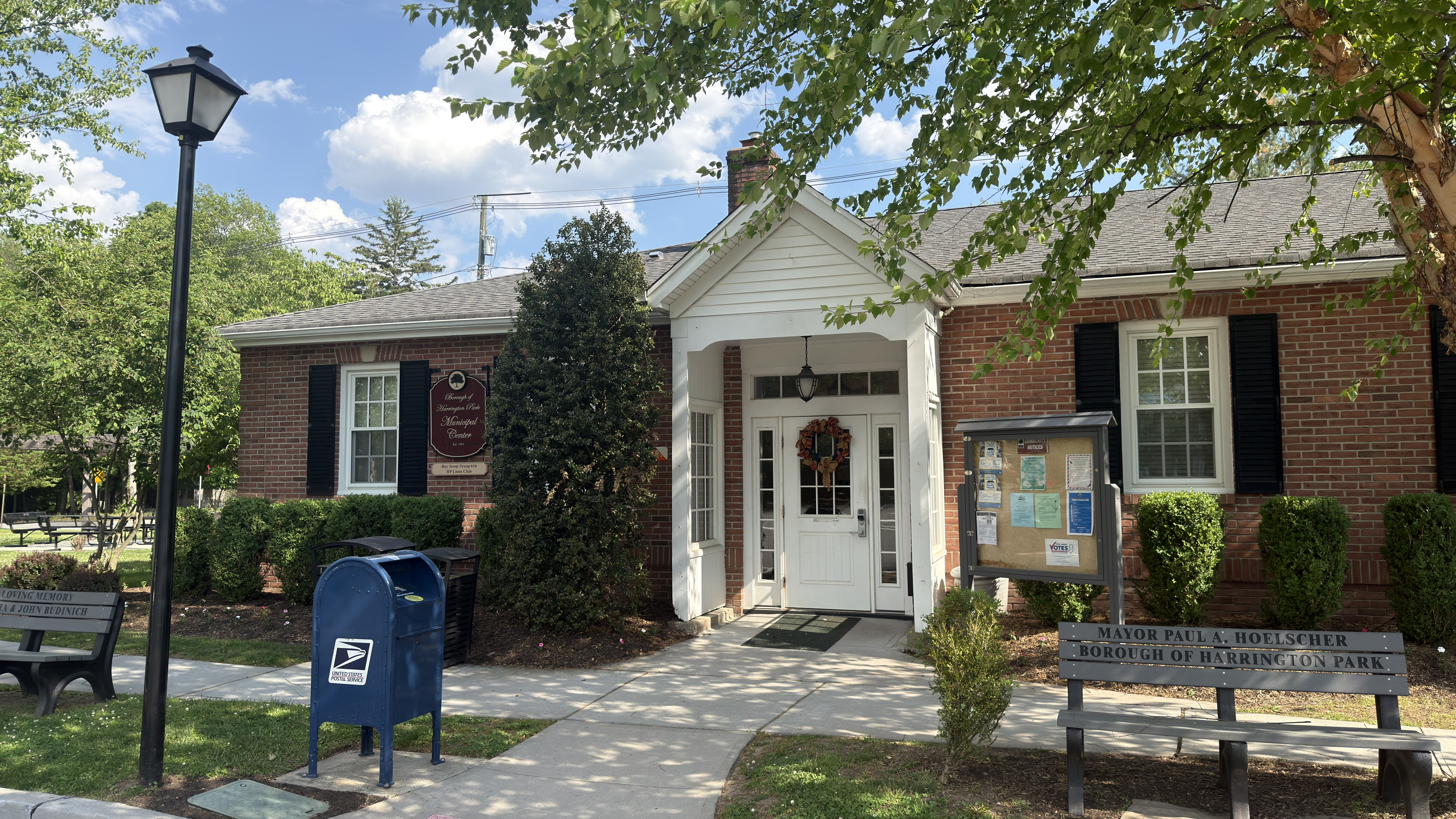
- Harrington Park Borough Hall

- Location of Harrington Park in Bergen County highlighted in red (left). Inset map: Location of Bergen County in New Jersey highlighted in orange (right).

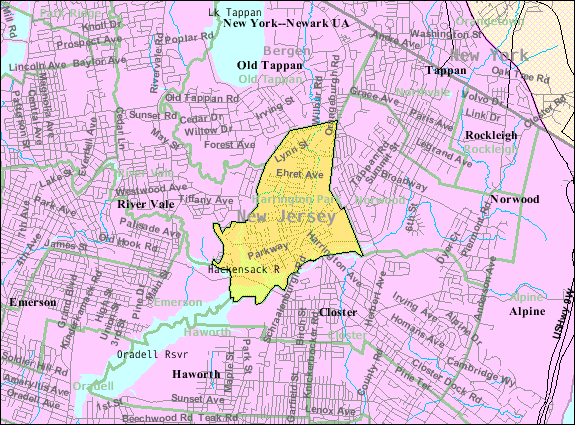
- Census Bureau map of Harrington Park, New Jersey
- Interactive map of Harrington Park, New Jersey
- Location in Bergen County Location in New Jersey Location in the United States
- Coordinates: 40.991681°N 73.980202°W
- Country: United States
- State: New Jersey
- County: Bergen
- Incorporated: March 29, 1904
- Named for: Haring family

Government
  - Type: Borough
  - Body: Borough Council
  - Mayor: Joon L. Chung (I, elected to unexpired term ending December 31, 2027)
  - Administrator: Kunjesh Trivedi
  - Municipal clerk: Carolyn Lee

Area
  - Total: 2.06 sq mi (5.34 km^{2})
  - Land: 1.85 sq mi (4.78 km^{2})
  - Water: 0.22 sq mi (0.56 km^{2}) 10.53%
  - Rank: 410th of 565 in state 49th of 70 in county
- Elevation: 49 ft (15 m)

Population (2020)
  - Total: 4,741
  - Estimate (2023): 4,990
  - Rank: 388th of 565 in state 62nd of 70 in county
  - Density: 2,568.9/sq mi (991.9/km^{2})
  - Rank: 246th of 565 in state 48th of 70 in county
- Time zone: UTC−05:00 (Eastern (EST))
  - Summer (DST): UTC−04:00 (Eastern (EDT))
- ZIP Code: 07640
- Area code: 201
- FIPS code: 3400330150
- GNIS feature ID: 0885244
- Website: harringtonparknj.gov

Harrington Park is a borough in Bergen County, in the U.S. state of New Jersey. As of the 2020 United States census, the borough's population was 4,741, an increase of 77 (+1.7%) from the 2010 census count of 4,664, which in turn reflected a decrease of 76 (−1.6%) from the 4,740 counted in the 2000 census.

Harrington Park was formed on March 29, 1904, from portions of Harrington Township and Washington Township, and parts of the borough of Closter.

The name Harrington Park was based on the larger Harrington Township from which it was in part derived, which in turn was based on the Harring family, early settlers to the region.

== Geography ==
According to the United States Census Bureau, the borough had a total area of 2.06 square miles (5.34 km^{2}), including 1.85 square miles (4.78 km^{2}) of land and 0.22 square miles (0.56 km^{2}) of water (10.53%).

The borough borders Closter, Emerson, Norwood, Old Tappan and River Vale.

== Demographics ==
Historical population
Census	Pop.	Note	%±
1900	269		—
1910	377		40.1%
1920	627		66.3%
1930	1,251		99.5%
1940	1,389		11.0%
1950	1,634		17.6%
1960	3,581		119.2%
1970	4,841		35.2%
1980	4,532		−6.4%
1990	4,623		2.0%
2000	4,740		2.5%
2010	4,664		−1.6%
2020	4,741		1.7%
2023 (est.)	4,990	▲	5.3%
Population sources: 1910–1920 1910; 1910–1930 1900–2020; 2000 2010 2020

=== Racial and ethnic composition ===
Harrington Park borough, Bergen County, New Jersey – Racial and ethnic composition Note: the US Census treats Hispanic/Latino as an ethnic category. This table excludes Latinos from the racial categories and assigns them to a separate category. Hispanics/Latinos may be of any race.
Race / Ethnicity (NH = Non-Hispanic)	Pop 2000	Pop 2010	Pop 2020	% 2000	% 2010	% 2020
White alone (NH)	3,869	3,592	3,235	81.62%	77.02%	68.23%
Black or African American alone (NH)	29	31	35	0.61%	0.66%	0.74%
Native American or Alaska Native alone (NH)	2	1	0	0.04%	0.02%	0.00%
Asian alone (NH)	694	812	1,049	14.64%	17.41%	22.13%
Native Hawaiian or Pacific Islander alone (NH)	0	9	0	0.00%	0.19%	0.00%
Other race alone (NH)	11	8	14	0.23%	0.17%	0.30%
Mixed race or Multiracial (NH)	13	48	109	0.27%	1.03%	2.30%
Hispanic or Latino (any race)	122	163	299	2.57%	3.49%	6.31%
Total	4,740	4,664	4,741	100.00%	100.00%	100.00%

=== 2020 census ===
As of the 2020 census, Harrington Park had a population of 4,741. The median age was 44.7 years. 24.3% of residents were under the age of 18 and 19.5% of residents were 65 years of age or older. For every 100 females there were 94.1 males, and for every 100 females age 18 and over there were 91.1 males age 18 and over.

100.0% of residents lived in urban areas, while 0.0% lived in rural areas.

There were 1,594 households in Harrington Park, of which 39.9% had children under the age of 18 living in them. Of all households, 72.6% were married-couple households, 7.6% were households with a male householder and no spouse or partner present, and 17.3% were households with a female householder and no spouse or partner present. About 15.1% of all households were made up of individuals and 10.6% had someone living alone who was 65 years of age or older.

There were 1,643 housing units, of which 3.0% were vacant. The homeowner vacancy rate was 0.8% and the rental vacancy rate was 4.5%.

=== 2010 census ===
The 2010 United States census counted 4,664 people, 1,592 households, and 1,328 families in the borough. The population density was 2,545.9 per square mile (983.0/km^{2}). There were 1,624 housing units at an average density of 886.5 per square mile (342.3/km^{2}). The racial makeup was 79.76% (3,720) White, 0.69% (32) Black or African American, 0.02% (1) Native American, 17.43% (813) Asian, 0.19% (9) Pacific Islander, 0.51% (24) from other races, and 1.39% (65) from two or more races. Hispanic or Latino of any race were 3.49% (163) of the population. Korean Americans accounted for 13.0% of the population.

Of the 1,592 households, 41.8% had children under the age of 18; 73.9% were married couples living together; 7.3% had a female householder with no husband present and 16.6% were non-families. Of all households, 14.6% were made up of individuals and 8.7% had someone living alone who was 65 years of age or older. The average household size was 2.93 and the average family size was 3.26. Same-sex couples headed 34 households in 2010, an increase more than five-fold from the six counted in 2000.

28.0% of the population were under the age of 18, 5.4% from 18 to 24, 18.3% from 25 to 44, 33.4% from 45 to 64, and 14.9% who were 65 years of age or older. The median age was 44.1 years. For every 100 females, the population had 93.6 males. For every 100 females ages 18 and older there were 89.6 males.

The Census Bureau's 2006–2010 American Community Survey showed that (in 2010 inflation-adjusted dollars) median household income was $115,875 (with a margin of error of +/− $28,119) and the median family income was $132,108 (+/− $18,521). Males had a median income of $95,119 (+/− $12,806) versus $49,656 (+/− $16,730) for females. The per capita income for the borough was $49,159 (+/− $5,612). About none of families and 1.0% of the population were below the poverty line, including none of those under age 18 and 1.2% of those age 65 or over.

=== 2000 census ===
As of the 2000 United States census, there were 4,740 people, 1,563 households, and 1,344 families residing in the borough. The population density was 2,555.0 inhabitants per square mile (986.5/km^{2}). There were 1,583 housing units at an average density of 853.3 per square mile (329.5/km^{2}). The racial makeup of the borough was 83.52% White, 0.68% African American, 0.04% Native American, 14.66% Asian, 0.63% from other races, and 0.46% from two or more races. Hispanic or Latino of any race were 2.57% of the population.

There were 1,563 households, out of which 44.4% had children under the age of 18 living with them, 78.4% were married couples living together, 6.1% had a female householder with no husband present, and 14.0% were non-families. 12.2% of all households were made up of individuals, and 7.4% had someone living alone who was 65 years of age or older. The average household size was 3.03 and the average family size was 3.31.

In the borough the population was spread out, with 28.6% under the age of 18, 5.0% from 18 to 24, 25.3% from 25 to 44, 28.3% from 45 to 64, and 12.8% who were 65 years of age or older. The median age was 40 years. For every 100 females, there were 94.7 males. For every 100 females age 18 and over, there were 91.0 males.

The median income for a household in the borough was $100,302, and the median income for a family was $124,376. Males had a median income of $71,776 versus $42,833 for females. The per capita income for the borough was $39,017. About 1.8% of families and 2.9% of the population were below the poverty line, including 4.6% of those under age 18 and 1.2% of those age 65 or over.

== Government ==
=== Local government ===
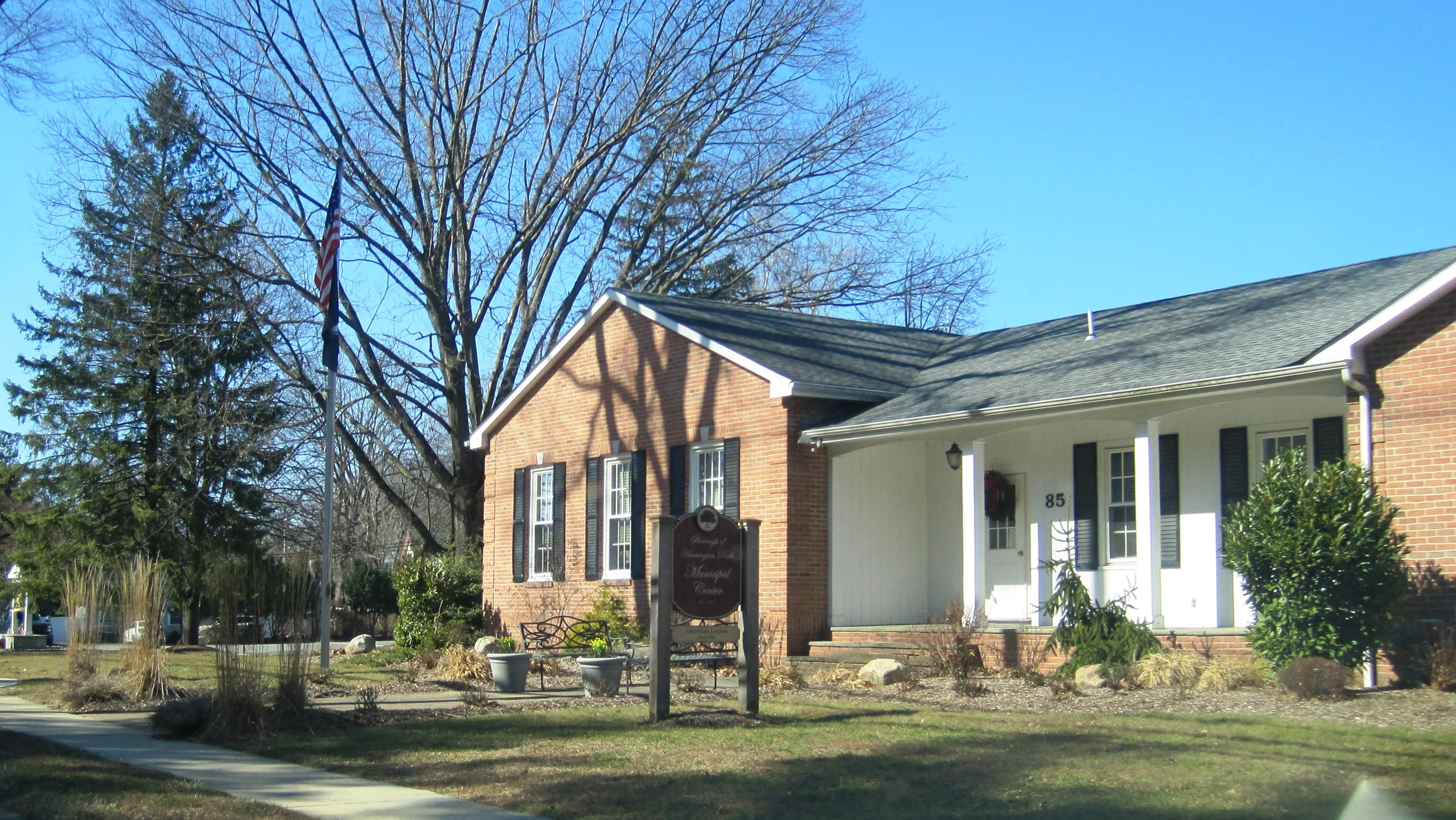
Harrington Park municipal center

Harrington Park is governed under the borough form of New Jersey municipal government, which is used in 218 municipalities (of the 564) statewide, making it the most common form of government in New Jersey. The governing body is comprised of a mayor and a borough council, with all positions elected at-large on a partisan basis as part of the November general election. A mayor is elected directly by the voters to a four-year term of office. The borough council includes six members elected to serve three-year terms on a staggered basis, with two seats coming up for election each year in a three-year cycle. The borough form of government used by Harrington Park is a "weak mayor / strong council" government in which council members act as the legislative body with the mayor presiding at meetings and voting only in the event of a tie. The mayor can veto ordinances subject to an override by a two-thirds majority vote of the council. The mayor makes committee and liaison assignments for council members, and most appointments are made by the mayor with the advice and consent of the council.

As of 2026, the position as mayor of Harrington Park is Joon L. Chung, who was elected to fill a term of office expiring December 31, 2027, that became vacant following the death of Independent Paul A. Hoelscher. Members of the Harrington Park Borough Council are Council President Allan S. Napolitano (I, 2026), William M. Blackinton (I, 2027), Jeffrey Brockman (I, 2026), Gregory J. Evanella (I, 2028), Jorden "Nick" Pedersen (I, 2027) and Diane G. Walker (I, 2028).

Paul Hoelscher, who had been the borough's mayor since being elected in 1992, died in office in June 2024. Joon L. Chung was elected in November 2025 to serve the balance of the term of office.

=== Federal, state and county representation ===
Harrington Park is located in the 5th Congressional District and is part of New Jersey's 39th state legislative district.

For the 119th United States Congress, New Jersey's 5th congressional district is represented by Josh Gottheimer (D, Wyckoff). New Jersey is represented in the United States Senate by Democrats Cory Booker (Newark, term ends 2027) and Andy Kim (Moorestown, term ends 2031).

For the 2026–2027 session, the 39th legislative district of the New Jersey Legislature is represented in the State Senate by Holly Schepisi (R, River Vale) and in the General Assembly by Robert Auth (R, Old Tappan) and John V. Azzariti (R, Saddle River).

Bergen County is governed by a directly elected County Executive, with legislative functions performed by a Board of County Commissioners comprised of seven members who are elected at-large to three-year terms in partisan elections on a staggered basis, with either two or three seats coming up for election each November; a Chairman and Vice Chairman are selected from among its seven members at a reorganization meeting held every January. As of 2025, the county executive is James J. Tedesco III (D, Paramus), whose four-year term of office ends December 31, 2026.

Bergen County's Commissioners are Chair Mary J. Amoroso (D, Mahwah, 2025), Vice Chair Steven A. Tanelli (D, North Arlington, 2027), Chair Pro Tem Joan Voss (D, Fort Lee, 2026), Rafael Marte (D, Bergenfield, 2026), Germaine M. Ortiz (D, Emerson, 2025), Thomas J. Sullivan Jr. (D, Montvale, 2025) and Tracy Silna Zur (D, Franklin Lakes, 2027).

Bergen County's elected constitutional officials are Clerk John S. Hogan (D, Northvale, 2026), Sheriff Anthony Cureton (D, Englewood, 2027) and Surrogate Michael R. Dressler (D, Cresskill, 2026).

=== Politics ===
As of March 2011, there were a total of 3,243 registered voters in Harrington Park, of which 813 (25.1% vs. 31.7% countywide) were registered as Democrats, 813 (25.1% vs. 21.1%) were registered as Republicans and 1,615 (49.8% vs. 47.1%) were registered as Unaffiliated. There was one voter registered to another party. Among the borough's 2010 Census population, 69.5% (vs. 57.1% in Bergen County) were registered to vote, including 96.5% of those ages 18 and over (vs. 73.7% countywide).

Gubernatorial election results for Harrington Park
Year	Republican		Democratic		Third party(ies)	
Year	No.	%	No.	%	No.	%
2025	1,010	44.83%	1,235	54.82%	8	0.36%
2021	933	44.60%	1,143	54.64%	16	0.76%
2017	722	46.34%	816	52.37%	20	1.28%
2013	1,019	63.65%	559	34.92%	23	1.44%
2009	994	51.99%	815	42.63%	103	5.39%
2005	909	49.21%	894	48.40%	44	2.38%

In the 2016 presidential election, Democrat Hillary Clinton received 1,382 votes (51.7% vs. 54.8% countywide), ahead of Republican Donald Trump with 1,147 votes (42.9% vs. 41.6%) and other candidates with 76 votes (2.8% vs. 3.0%), among the 2,673 ballots cast by the borough's 3,510 registered voters, for a turnout of 76.2% (vs. 72.5% in Bergen County). In the 2012 presidential election, Republican Mitt Romney received 1,340 votes (51.2% vs. 43.5% countywide), ahead of Democrat Barack Obama with 1,218 votes (46.5% vs. 54.8%) and other candidates with 32 votes (1.2% vs. 0.9%), among the 2,618 ballots cast by the borough's 3,447 registered voters, for a turnout of 76.0% (vs. 70.4% in Bergen County). In the 2008 presidential election, Republican John McCain received 1,371 votes (49.7% vs. 44.5% countywide), ahead of Democrat Barack Obama with 1,355 votes (49.1% vs. 53.9%) and other candidates with 14 votes (0.5% vs. 0.8%), among the 2,761 ballots cast by the borough's 3,413 registered voters, for a turnout of 80.9% (vs. 76.8% in Bergen County).

Presidential elections results
Year	Republican	Democratic
2024	43.3% 1,253	54.3% 1,572
2020	39.3% 1,226	59.3% 1,851
2016	42.9% 1,147	51.7% 1,382
2012	51.2% 1,340	46.5% 1,218
2008	49.7% 1,371	49.1% 1,255
2004	52.8%1,445	46.2% 1,263

In the 2013 gubernatorial election, Republican Chris Christie received 63.6% of the vote (1,019 cast), ahead of Democrat Barbara Buono with 34.9% (559 votes), and other candidates with 1.4% (23 votes), among the 1,655 ballots cast by the borough's 3,307 registered voters (54 ballots were spoiled), for a turnout of 50.0%. In the 2009 gubernatorial election, Republican Chris Christie received 994 votes (51.2% vs. 45.8% countywide), ahead of Democrat Jon Corzine with 815 votes (42.0% vs. 48.0%), Independent Chris Daggett with 90 votes (4.6% vs. 4.7%) and other candidates with 13 votes (0.7% vs. 0.5%), among the 1,941 ballots cast by the borough's 3,338 registered voters, yielding a 58.1% turnout (vs. 50.0% in the county).

United States Senate election results for Harrington Park1
Year	Republican		Democratic		Third party(ies)	
Year	No.	%	No.	%	No.	%
2024	1,137	41.18%	1,581	57.26%	43	1.56%
2018	927	47.08%	986	50.08%	56	2.84%
2012	1,183	49.33%	1,167	48.67%	48	2.00%
2006	957	52.32%	856	46.80%	16	0.87%

United States Senate election results for Harrington Park2
Year	Republican		Democratic		Third party(ies)	
Year	No.	%	No.	%	No.	%
2020	1,158	37.92%	1,865	61.07%	31	1.02%
2014	671	38.72%	1,045	60.30%	17	0.98%
2013	511	38.54%	808	60.94%	7	0.53%
2008	1,256	49.96%	1,226	48.77%	32	1.27%

== Education ==
The Harrington Park School District serves public school students in pre-kindergarten through eighth grade at Harrington Park School. As of the 2022–23 school year, the district, comprised of one school, had an enrollment of 645 students and 58.7 classroom teachers (on an FTE basis), for a student–teacher ratio of 11.0:1.

Students in public school for ninth through twelfth grades attend Northern Valley Regional High School at Old Tappan, together with students from Northvale, Norwood and Old Tappan, along with students from Rockleigh who attend the high school as part of a sending/receiving relationship. The school is one of the two schools of the Northern Valley Regional High School District, which also serves students from the neighboring communities of Closter, Demarest, Haworth at the Northern Valley Regional High School at Demarest. During the 1994–1996 school years, Northern Valley Regional High School at Old Tappan was awarded the Blue Ribbon School Award of Excellence by the United States Department of Education. As of the 2022–23 school year, the high school had an enrollment of 1,002 students and 106.7 classroom teachers (on an FTE basis), for a student–teacher ratio of 9.4:1.

Public school students from the borough, and all of Bergen County, are eligible to attend the secondary education programs offered by the Bergen County Technical Schools, which include the Bergen County Academies in Hackensack, and the Bergen Tech campus in Teterboro or Paramus. The district offers programs on a shared-time or full-time basis, with admission based on a selective application process and tuition covered by the student's home school district.

== Transportation ==
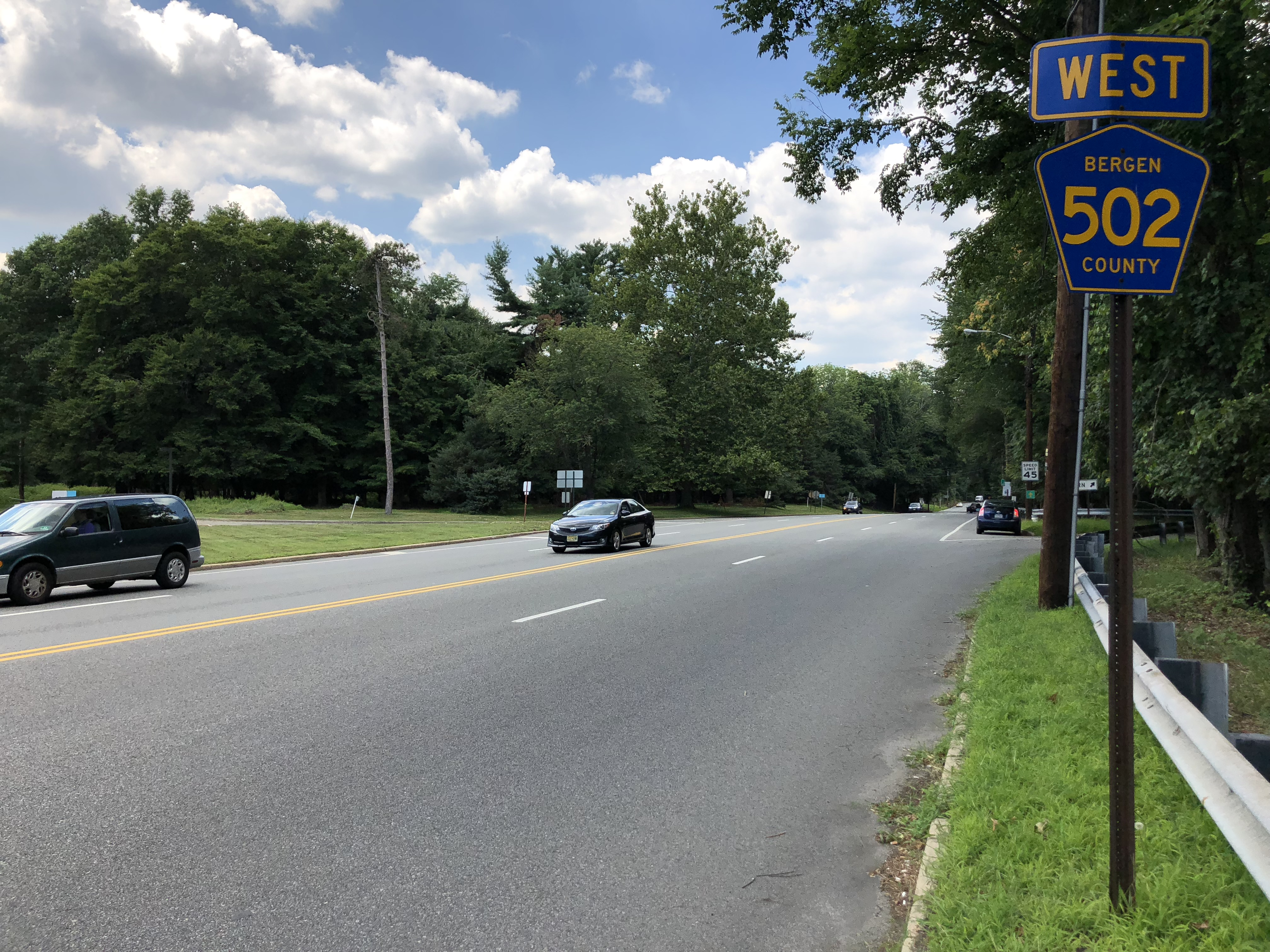
View looking west along County Route 502 in Harrington Park

=== Roads and highways ===
As of May 2010, the borough had a total of 26.66 miles (42.91 km) of roadways, of which 21.04 miles (33.86 km) were maintained by the municipality and 5.62 miles (9.04 km) by Bergen County.

The most significant roads serving Harrington Park are County Route 502 and County Route 505.

=== Public transportation ===
NJ Transit bus route 167 serves Harrington Park, providing service to and from the Port Authority Bus Terminal in Midtown Manhattan.

Rockland Coaches 20/20T routes provide service to the Port Authority Bus Terminal.

== Notable people ==
People who were born in, residents of, or otherwise closely associated with Harrington Park include:

- Craig Beardsley (born 1961), record-setting swimmer
- Cory Booker (born 1969), former Mayor of Newark, New Jersey; US Senator representing New Jersey
- Gregory Jacobs (born 1968), film director, producer and screenwriter, who has frequently collaborated with several film directors, most notably Steven Soderbergh
- Sari Jordan, American singer-songwriter and musician
- Greta Kiernan (1933–2023), politician who served in the New Jersey General Assembly from the 39th Legislative District from 1978 to 1980
- Beth Leavel (born 1955), Tony Award-winning Broadway actress
- Jimmy Lydon (1923–2022), movie and television actor
- Justin Minaya (born 1999), current professional basketball player in the NBA
- Omar Minaya (born 1958), former General Manager for the New York Mets
- Jennifer Moore (1988–2006), high school student murdered in July 2006 after a night of clubbing in New York City
- Esmeralda Negron (born 1983), professional soccer player who played for the New Jersey Wildcats
- Karl Nessler (1872–1951), inventor of the permanent wave
- James O'Brien (born 1969) author, screenwriter and film director
- Dan Pasqua (born 1961), baseball player for the New York Yankees
- Jon Rudnitsky (born 1989), comedian and cast member on Saturday Night Live
- Angela Santomero (born 1968), Nickelodeon executive and co-creator of Blue's Clues
- Jackie Simes (born 1942), track cyclist who competed at the 1960, 1964 and 1968 Summer Olympics and was the 1964 U.S. National Champion
- Jean-Claude Suares (1942–2013), illustrator who was the first Op-ed page art director at The New York Times
- A. W. Tillinghast (1874–1942), golf course architect of Ridgewood Country Club, Baltusrol Golf Club, Aronimink Golf Club, Winged Foot Golf Club and many other notable courses

== Sources ==
- Municipal Incorporations of the State of New Jersey (according to Counties). Division of Local Government, Department of the Treasury, New Jersey. December 1, 1958.
- Clayton, W. Woodford; Nelson, Nelson (1882). History of Bergen and Passaic Counties, New Jersey, with Biographical Sketches of Many of its Pioneers and Prominent Men. Philadelphia: Everts and Peck – via archive.org.
- Harvey, Cornelius Burnham, ed. (1900). Genealogical History of Hudson and Bergen Counties, New Jersey. New York: New Jersey Genealogical Publishing Co. – via archive.org.
- Van Valen, James M. (1900). History of Bergen County, New Jersey. New York: New Jersey Publishing and Engraving Co. – via archive.org.
- Westervelt, Frances A. (1923). History of Bergen County, New Jersey, 1630–1923. Lewis Historical Publishing Company – via Google Books.
