= Demarest, New Jersey =

Borough in Bergen County, New Jersey, US

- Borough
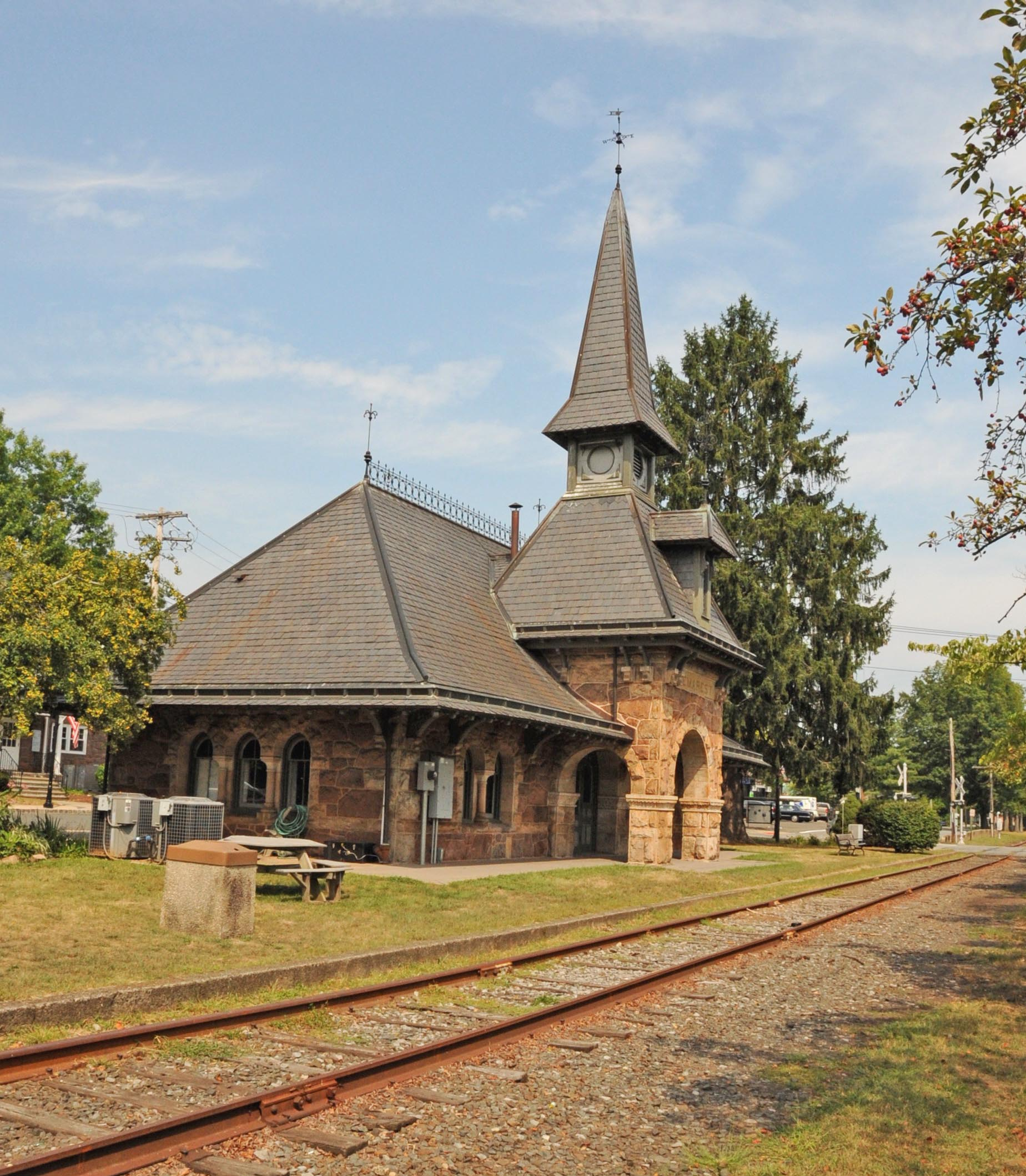
- Demarest Railroad Depot

- Location of Demarest in Bergen County highlighted in red (left). Inset map: Location of Bergen County in New Jersey highlighted in orange (right).

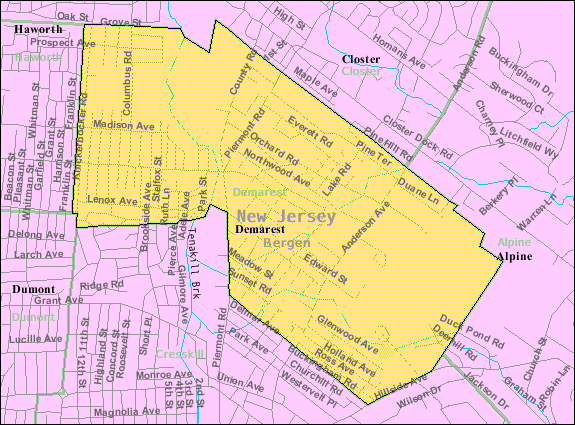
- Census Bureau map of Demarest, New Jersey

- Location in Bergen County Location in New Jersey Location in the United States
- Coordinates: 40.953365°N 73.956348°W
- Country: United States
- State: New Jersey
- County: Bergen
- Incorporated: April 8, 1903
- Named for: Ralph S. Demarest

Government
  - Type: Borough
  - Body: Borough Council
  - Mayor: Brian K. Bernstein (D, term ends December 31, 2026)
  - Administrator: Julie Falkenstern
  - Municipal clerk: Julie Falkenstern (acting)

Area
  - Total: 2.08 sq mi (5.38 km^{2})
  - Land: 2.07 sq mi (5.37 km^{2})
  - Water: 0.0077 sq mi (0.02 km^{2}) 0.34%
  - Rank: 405th of 565 in state 46th of 70 in county
- Elevation: 52 ft (16 m)

Population (2020)
  - Total: 4,981
  - Estimate (2023): 4,846
  - Rank: 375th of 565 in state 60th of 70 in county
  - Density: 2,403.4/sq mi (928.0/km^{2})
  - Rank: 259th of 565 in state 54th of 70 in county
- Time zone: UTC−05:00 (Eastern (EST))
  - Summer (DST): UTC−04:00 (Eastern (EDT))
- ZIP Code: 07627
- Area code: 201 exchanges: 750, 767, 768, 784
- FIPS code: 3400317530
- GNIS feature ID: 0885195
- Website: demarestnj.gov

Demarest is a borough in Bergen County, in the U.S. state of New Jersey. As of the 2020 United States census, the borough's population was 4,981, an increase of 100 (+2.0%) from the 2010 census count of 4,881, which in turn reflected an increase of 36 (+0.7%) from the 4,845 counted in the 2000 census. Located in the northeastern corner of New Jersey and its Gateway Region, Demarest is part of the New York City Metropolitan Area.

Demarest was formed by an act of the New Jersey Legislature on April 8, 1903, from portions of Harrington Township and Palisades Township. The borough was named for the Demarest family and for the Demarest train station, which had in turn been named for Ralph S. Demarest, who was a director of the Northern Railroad of New Jersey that built the station and represented the area in both the New Jersey General Assembly and the New Jersey Senate in the mid-19th century.

== Geography ==
According to the United States Census Bureau, the borough had a total area of 2.08 square miles (5.38 km^{2}), including 2.07 square miles (5.37 km^{2}) of land and 0.01 square miles (0.02 km^{2}) of water (0.34%).

At the heart of Demarest is an area known as the Duck Pond, which is a section of the Tenakill Brook.

The borough borders the Bergen County municipalities of Alpine, Closter, Cresskill, Dumont and Haworth.

Demarest is one of the fifteen towns of Northern Valley area in Bergen.

== Demographics ==
Historical population
Census	Pop.	Note	%±
1900	393		—
1910	560		42.5%
1920	654		16.8%
1930	1,013		54.9%
1940	1,165		15.0%
1950	1,786		53.3%
1960	4,231		136.9%
1970	5,133		21.3%
1980	4,963		−3.3%
1990	4,800		−3.3%
2000	4,845		0.9%
2010	4,881		0.7%
2020	4,981		2.0%
2023 (est.)	4,846	▼	−2.7%
Population sources: 1910–1920 1910; 1910–1930 1900–2020; 2000 2010 2020

=== Racial and ethnic composition ===
Demarest borough, Bergen County, New Jersey – Racial and ethnic composition Note: the US Census treats Hispanic/Latino as an ethnic category. This table excludes Latinos from the racial categories and assigns them to a separate category. Hispanics/Latinos may be of any race.
Race / Ethnicity (NH = Non-Hispanic)	Pop 2000	Pop 2010	Pop 2020	% 2000	% 2010	% 2020
White alone (NH)	3,616	3,273	2,941	74.63%	67.06%	59.04%
Black or African American alone (NH)	23	26	41	0.47%	0.53%	0.82%
Native American or Alaska Native alone (NH)	0	1	1	0.00%	0.02%	0.02%
Asian alone (NH)	977	1,276	1,562	20.17%	26.14%	31.36%
Native Hawaiian or Pacific Islander alone (NH)	1	0	1	0.02%	0.00%	0.02%
Other race alone (NH)	7	6	24	0.14%	0.12%	0.48%
Mixed race or Multiracial (NH)	54	83	141	1.11%	1.70%	2.83%
Hispanic or Latino (any race)	167	216	270	3.45%	4.43%	5.42%
Total	4,845	4,881	4,981	100.00%	100.00%	100.00%

=== 2020 census ===
As of the 2020 census, Demarest had a population of 4,981. The median age was 44.8 years. 25.9% of residents were under the age of 18 and 16.9% of residents were 65 years of age or older. For every 100 females there were 95.9 males, and for every 100 females age 18 and over there were 92.8 males age 18 and over.

100.0% of residents lived in urban areas, while 0.0% lived in rural areas.

There were 1,598 households in Demarest, of which 42.3% had children under the age of 18 living in them. Of all households, 76.2% were married-couple households, 6.9% were households with a male householder and no spouse or partner present, and 14.8% were households with a female householder and no spouse or partner present. About 11.0% of all households were made up of individuals and 7.4% had someone living alone who was 65 years of age or older.

There were 1,680 housing units, of which 4.9% were vacant. The homeowner vacancy rate was 1.7% and the rental vacancy rate was 9.3%.

Korean Americans accounted for 19.6% of the population.

=== 2010 census ===
The 2010 United States census counted 4,881 people, 1,597 households, and 1,404 families in the borough. The population density was 2,361.8 per square mile (911.9/km^{2}). There were 1,659 housing units at an average density of 802.7 per square mile (309.9/km^{2}). The racial makeup was 70.21% (3,427) White, 0.64% (31) Black or African American, 0.02% (1) Native American, 26.41% (1,289) Asian, 0.00% (0) Pacific Islander, 0.74% (36) from other races, and 1.99% (97) from two or more races. Hispanic or Latino of any race were 4.43% (216) of the population. Korean Americans accounted for 17.3% of the population.

Of the 1,597 households, 45.1% had children under the age of 18; 76.8% were married couples living together; 8.4% had a female householder with no husband present and 12.1% were non-families. Of all households, 10.8% were made up of individuals and 7.0% had someone living alone who was 65 years of age or older. The average household size was 3.05 and the average family size was 3.29. Same-sex couples headed eight households in 2010, an increase from the four counted in 2000.

27.5% of the population were under the age of 18, 6.2% from 18 to 24, 18.2% from 25 to 44, 33.6% from 45 to 64, and 14.4% who were 65 years of age or older. The median age was 43.9 years. For every 100 females, the population had 93.4 males. For every 100 females ages 18 and older there were 89.7 males.

The Census Bureau's 2006–2010 American Community Survey showed that (in 2010 inflation-adjusted dollars) median household income was $147,714 (with a margin of error of +/− $14,743) and the median family income was $150,208 (+/− $9,154). Males had a median income of $101,085 (+/− $10,254) versus $58,295 (+/− $10,277) for females. The per capita income for the borough was $69,460 (+/− $10,589). About 1.4% of families and 1.2% of the population were below the poverty line, including 1.2% of those under age 18 and none of those age 65 or over.

=== 2000 census ===
As of the 2000 United States census there were 4,845 people, 1,601 households, and 1,386 families residing in the borough. The population density was 2,343.7 inhabitants per square mile (904.9/km^{2}). There were 1,634 housing units at an average density of 790.4 per square mile (305.2/km^{2}). The racial makeup of the borough was 77.28% White, 0.50% African American, 0.02% Native American, 20.25% Asian, 0.02% Pacific Islander, 0.47% from other races, and 1.47% from two or more races. Hispanic or Latino of any race were 3.45% of the population.

As of the 2000 Census, 3.72% of Demarest's residents identified themselves as being of Japanese ancestry, which was the second highest of any municipality in New Jersey—behind Fort Lee (6.09%)—for all places with 1,000 or more residents identifying their ancestry. In this same census, 2.3% of Demarest's residents identified themselves as being of Armenian-American ancestry. This was the 19th highest percentage of Armenian American people in any place in the United States with 1,000 or more residents identifying their ancestry.

There were 1,601 households, out of which 45.5% had children under the age of 18 living with them, 76.2% were married couples living together, 8.0% had a female householder with no husband present, and 13.4% were non-families. 11.6% of all households were made up of individuals, and 7.2% had someone living alone who was 65 years of age or older. The average household size was 3.02 and the average family size was 3.27.

In the borough the age distribution of the population shows 28.9% under the age of 18, 4.7% from 18 to 24, 25.1% from 25 to 44, 26.9% from 45 to 64, and 14.4% who were 65 years of age or older. The median age was 41 years. For every 100 females, there were 96.2 males. For every 100 females age 18 and over, there were 90.9 males.

The median income for a household in the borough was $103,286, and the median income for a family was $113,144. Males had a median income of $82,597 versus $43,750 for females. The per capita income for the borough was $51,939. About 0.9% of families and 1.6% of the population were below the poverty line, including 0.7% of those under age 18 and 1.6% of those age 65 or over.

== Government ==
=== Local government ===
Demarest is governed under the borough form of New Jersey municipal government, which is used in 218 municipalities (of the 564) statewide, making it the most common form of government in New Jersey. The governing body is comprised of a mayor and a borough council, with all positions elected at-large on a partisan basis as part of the November general election. A mayor is elected directly by the voters to a four-year term of office. The borough council includes six members elected to serve three-year terms on a staggered basis, with two seats coming up for election each year in a three-year cycle. The borough form of government used by Demarest is a "weak mayor / strong council" government in which council members act as the legislative body with the mayor presiding at meetings and voting only in the event of a tie. The mayor can veto ordinances subject to an override by a two-thirds majority vote of the council. The mayor makes committee and liaison assignments for council members, and most appointments are made by the mayor with the advice and consent of the council.

As of 2026, the mayor of Demarest Borough is Democrat Brian K. Bernstein, whose term of office ends December 31, 2026. Members of the Borough Council are Council President Andrea Slowikowski (R, 2027), Sharon Carmeli (D, 2028), Adam J. Collins (D, 2026), Daryl Ury Fox (D, 2027), Daniel Marks (D, 2028) and Jonathan Reiss (D, 2026).

=== Federal, state and county representation ===
Demarest is located in the 5th Congressional District and is part of New Jersey's 39th state legislative district.

For the 119th United States Congress, New Jersey's 5th congressional district is represented by Josh Gottheimer (D, Wyckoff). New Jersey is represented in the United States Senate by Democrats Cory Booker (Newark, term ends 2027) and Andy Kim (Moorestown, term ends 2031).

For the 2026–2027 session, the 39th legislative district of the New Jersey Legislature is represented in the State Senate by Holly Schepisi (R, River Vale) and in the General Assembly by Robert Auth (R, Old Tappan) and John V. Azzariti (R, Saddle River).

Bergen County is governed by a directly elected County Executive, with legislative functions performed by a Board of County Commissioners comprised of seven members who are elected at-large to three-year terms in partisan elections on a staggered basis, with either two or three seats coming up for election each November; a Chairman and Vice Chairman are selected from among its seven members at a reorganization meeting held every January. As of 2025, the county executive is James J. Tedesco III (D, Paramus), whose four-year term of office ends December 31, 2026.

Bergen County's Commissioners are Chair Mary J. Amoroso (D, Mahwah, 2025), Vice Chair Steven A. Tanelli (D, North Arlington, 2027), Chair Pro Tem Joan Voss (D, Fort Lee, 2026), Rafael Marte (D, Bergenfield, 2026), Germaine M. Ortiz (D, Emerson, 2025), Thomas J. Sullivan Jr. (D, Montvale, 2025) and Tracy Silna Zur (D, Franklin Lakes, 2027).

Bergen County's elected constitutional officials are Clerk John S. Hogan (D, Northvale, 2026), Sheriff Anthony Cureton (D, Englewood, 2027) and Surrogate Michael R. Dressler (D, Cresskill, 2026).

=== Politics ===
As of March 2011, there were a total of 3,117 registered voters in Demarest, of which 984 (31.6% vs. 31.7% countywide) were registered as Democrats, 589 (18.9% vs. 21.1%) were registered as Republicans and 1,542 (49.5% vs. 47.1%) were registered as Unaffiliated. There were 2 voters registered as Libertarians or Greens. Among the borough's 2010 Census population, 63.9% (vs. 57.1% in Bergen County) were registered to vote, including 88.1% of those ages 18 and over (vs. 73.7% countywide).

Gubernatorial election results for Demarest
Year	Republican		Democratic		Third party(ies)	
Year	No.	%	No.	%	No.	%
2025	856	42.61%	1,143	56.89%	10	0.50%
2021	671	39.68%	1,013	59.91%	7	0.41%
2017	521	39.71%	780	59.45%	11	0.84%
2013	883	62.49%	515	36.45%	15	1.06%
2009	787	46.35%	823	48.47%	88	5.18%
2005	782	45.15%	924	53.35%	26	1.50%

In the 2016 presidential election, Democrat Hillary Clinton received 1,578 votes (62.4% vs. 54.2% countywide), ahead of Republican Donald Trump with 853 votes (33.7% vs. 41.1% countywide) and other candidates with 68 votes (2.7% vs. 3.0% countywide), among the 2,528 ballots cast by the borough's 3,491 registered voters, for a turnout of 72.4% (vs. 73% in Bergen County). In the 2012 presidential election, Democrat Barack Obama received 1,211 votes (51.0% vs. 54.8% countywide), ahead of Republican Mitt Romney with 1,127 votes (47.5% vs. 43.5%) and other candidates with 17 votes (0.7% vs. 0.9%), among the 2,373 ballots cast by the borough's 3,343 registered voters, for a turnout of 71.0% (vs. 70.4% in Bergen County). In the 2008 presidential election, Democrat Barack Obama received 1,388 votes (54.9% vs. 53.9% countywide), ahead of Republican John McCain with 1,105 votes (43.7% vs. 44.5%) and other candidates with 14 votes (0.6% vs. 0.8%), among the 2,526 ballots cast by the borough's 3,212 registered voters, for a turnout of 78.6% (vs. 76.8% in Bergen County). In the 2004 presidential election, Democrat John Kerry received 1,292 votes (51.4% vs. 51.7% countywide), ahead of Republican George W. Bush with 1,204 votes (47.9% vs. 47.2%) and other candidates with 12 votes (0.5% vs. 0.7%), among the 2,512 ballots cast by the borough's 3,083 registered voters, for a turnout of 81.5% (vs. 76.9% in the whole county).

Presidential elections results
Year	Republican	Democratic
2024	37.7% 934	59.5% 1,472
2020	31.2% 926	67.6% 2,006
2016	33.7% 853	62.4% 1,578
2012	47.5% 1,127	51.0% 1,211
2008	43.7% 1,105	54.9% 1,388
2004	47.9% 1,204	51.4% 1,292

In the 2013 gubernatorial election, Republican Chris Christie received 62.5% of the vote (883 cast), ahead of Democrat Barbara Buono with 36.4% (515 votes), and other candidates with 1.1% (15 votes), among the 1,452 ballots cast by the borough's 3,167 registered voters (39 ballots were spoiled), for a turnout of 45.8%. In the 2009 gubernatorial election, Democrat Jon Corzine received 823 ballots cast (48.2% vs. 48.0% countywide), ahead of Republican Chris Christie with 787 votes (46.1% vs. 45.8%), Independent Chris Daggett with 78 votes (4.6% vs. 4.7%) and other candidates with 10 votes (0.6% vs. 0.5%), among the 1,708 ballots cast by the borough's 3,164 registered voters, yielding a 54.0% turnout (vs. 50.0% in the county).

United States Senate election results for Demarest1
Year	Republican		Democratic		Third party(ies)	
Year	No.	%	No.	%	No.	%
2024	921	37.73%	1,488	60.96%	32	1.31%
2018	739	40.34%	1,059	57.81%	34	1.86%
2012	1,001	45.42%	1,181	53.58%	22	1.00%
2006	885	45.88%	1,016	52.67%	28	1.45%

United States Senate election results for Demarest2
Year	Republican		Democratic		Third party(ies)	
Year	No.	%	No.	%	No.	%
2020	1,000	34.16%	1,908	65.19%	19	0.65%
2014	651	39.22%	990	59.64%	19	1.14%
2013	345	37.87%	555	60.92%	11	1.21%
2008	981	41.94%	1,331	56.90%	27	1.15%

== Education ==
The Demarest Public Schools serve students in pre-kindergarten through eighth grade. As of the 2021–22 school year, the district, comprised of three schools, had an enrollment of 714 students and 71.7 classroom teachers (on an FTE basis), for a student–teacher ratio of 10.0:1. Schools in the district (with 2021–22 enrollment data from the National Center for Education Statistics) are County Road School with 168 students in pre-kindergarten through first grade, Luther Lee Emerson Schools with 217 students in grades 2 - 4 and Demarest Middle School with 320 students in grades 5 through 8.

Students in ninth through twelfth grades attend Northern Valley Regional High School at Demarest in Demarest, together with students from Closter and Haworth. The high school is part of the Northern Valley Regional High School District, which also serves students from Harrington Park, Northvale, Norwood and Old Tappan at Northern Valley Regional High School at Old Tappan. During the 1994–1996 school years, Northern Valley Regional High School at Demarest was awarded the Blue Ribbon School Award of Excellence by the United States Department of Education. As of the 2021–22 school year, the high school had an enrollment of 974 students and 91.3 classroom teachers (on an FTE basis), for a student–teacher ratio of 10.7:1.

Public school students from the borough, and all of Bergen County, are eligible to attend the secondary education programs offered by the Bergen County Technical Schools, which include the Bergen County Academies in Hackensack, and the Bergen Tech campus in Teterboro or Paramus. The district offers programs on a shared-time or full-time basis, with admission based on a selective application process and tuition covered by the student's home school district.

The Academy of the Holy Angels is a private middle school and college preparatory high school serving students in sixth through twelfth grade that operates under the auspices of the Roman Catholic Archdiocese of Newark.

== Emergency services ==
=== Fire department ===
Demarest has a volunteer fire department that was established in 1894. Its station is located on Park Street and consists of Engine 461, Rescue 465, Engine 2, and Ladder 1.

=== Medical services ===
Demarest has a volunteer ambulance corps. that was first established in 1961 and is located on Wakelee Drive.

=== Police department ===
The Demarest Police Department was established in 1903 with its station on Serpentine Road.

== Transportation ==
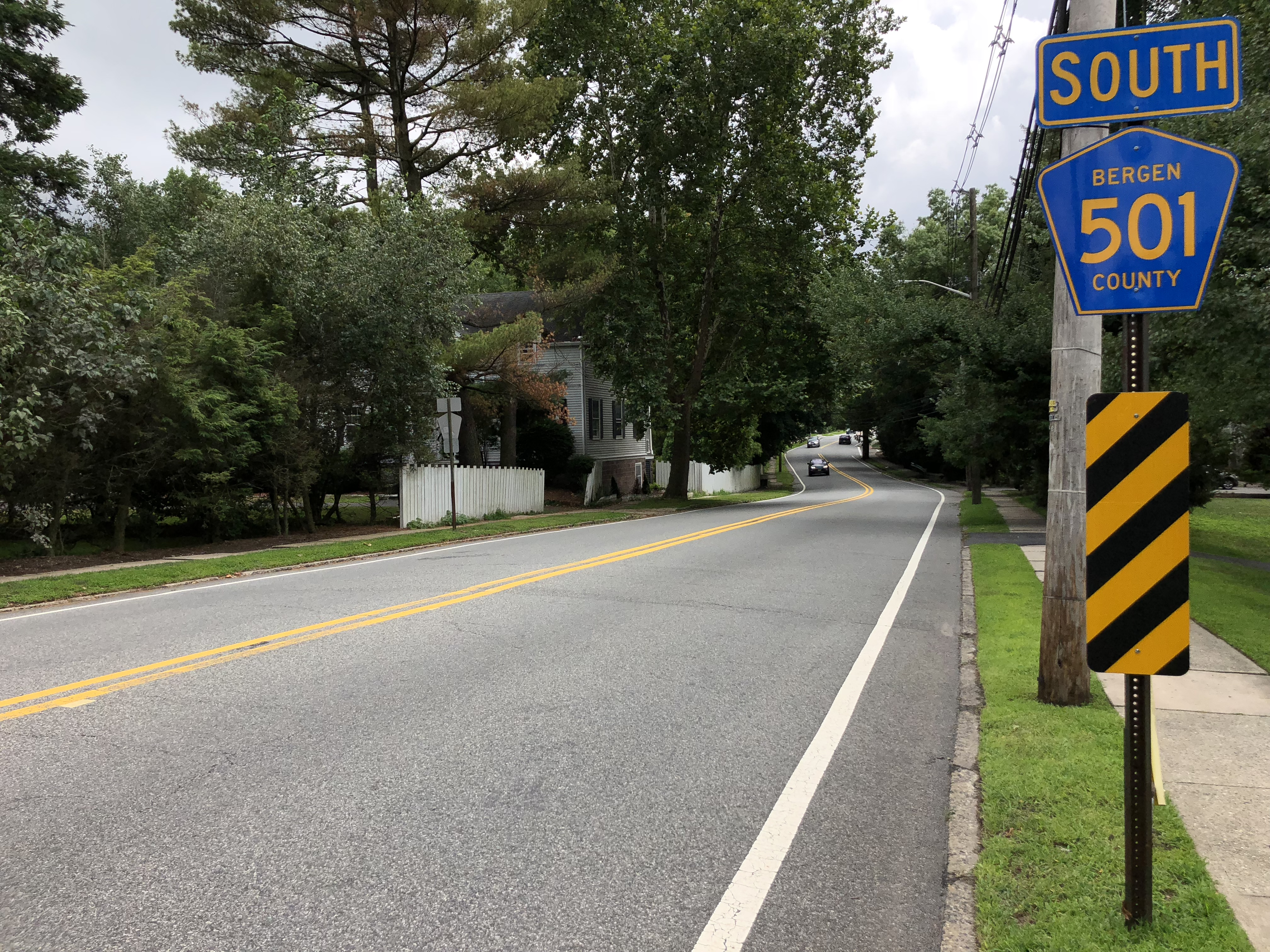
County Route 501 southbound in Demarest

=== Roads and highways ===
As of May 2010, the borough had a total of 27.27 miles (43.89 km) of roadways, of which 21.56 miles (34.70 km) were maintained by the municipality and 5.71 miles (9.19 km) by Bergen County.

County Route 501 and County Route 505 travels through Demarest. While Demarest is a small community, there are often traffic jams at around 8:00 am and 3:00 pm when all three grammar schools let out for the day. These small traffic jams usually occur at the intersection of County Road and Hardenburgh Avenue, and sometimes require the local police to direct traffic.

=== Public transportation ===
Demarest is served by Rockland Coaches routes 20/20T, with a stop by the Duck Pond on County Route 501 which provides service to and from the Port Authority Bus Terminal in Midtown Manhattan and the Palisades Center in West Nyack, New York, a common shopping destination for many residents.

Demarest was served by the Demarest Railroad Depot until passenger traffic stopped in 1966. After the borough purchased the site in 1978, the station was restored and has been listed on the National Register of Historic Places since 2004. It has since been used by local organizations for community events.

== Notable people ==
People who were born in, residents of, or otherwise closely associated with Demarest include:

- John Calabro (1914–1994), artist and sculptor who has created coins, medals, plaques, busts, statutes and heroic-size works of famous events and notable figures
- Gerald Cardinale (1934–2021), member of the New Jersey Senate from 1982 until his death, who served as Mayor of Demarest from 1975 to 1979
- David Einhorn (born 1968), hedge fund manager, who founded Greenlight Capital
- Halim El-Dabh (1921–2017), Egyptian-born composer who made Demarest his home in 1957 and 1958
- Lawrence Frank (born 1970), former head coach of the Detroit Pistons and the New Jersey Nets
- Augustus A. Hardenbergh (1830–1889), represented New Jersey's 7th congressional district from 1875 to 1879, and again from 1881 to 1883
- Gregory T. Linteris (born 1957), scientist who flew as a payload specialist on two NASA Space Shuttle missions in 1997
- Sparky Lyle (born 1944), MLB pitcher who was a resident during his time with the New York Yankees which was mentioned numerous times in his 1979 book The Bronx Zoo
- Ava Markham (born 1999), tennis player
- Aline Brosh McKenna (born 1967), screenwriter
- Bob Menne (1942–2023), PGA Tour and Champions Tour golfer
- Herschel L. Mosier (1900–1979), football and basketball player and coach
- Dennis Shulman (born 1950), rabbi, psychologist and politician
- Richard H. Tedford (1929–2011), paleontologist
- Edmund W. Wakelee (1869–1945), President of the New Jersey Senate and the Public Service Corporation
- Lucius Walker (1930–2010), Baptist minister best known for his opposition to the United States embargo against Cuba
- Barry Weiss (born 1959), music industry executive who has been Chairman and CEO of The Island Def Jam Music Group and Universal Republic Records
