= Northern Valley Regional High School at Old Tappan =

High school in Bergen County, New Jersey, US

Location
- 100 Central Avenue; Old Tappan, Bergen County, New Jersey 07675; United States; 41.01001°N 73.974414°W

Information
- Type: Public high school
- Established: 1962
- School district: Northern Valley Regional High School District
- NCES School ID: 341176000652
- Principal: Taylor West
- Faculty: 106.6 FTEs
- Grades: 9-12
- Enrollment: 1,086 (as of 2024–25)
- Student to teacher ratio: 10.2:1
- Colors: Navy and Vegas gold
- Athletics conference: Big North Conference (general); North Jersey Super Football Conference (football)
- Team name: Golden Knights
- Newspaper: The Lance
- Radio station: WNVW
- Website: nvot.nvnet.org

Northern Valley Regional High School at Old Tappan is a comprehensive four-year public high school serving students in ninth through twelfth grades from the suburban communities of Harrington Park, Northvale, Norwood and Old Tappan in Bergen County, in the U.S. state of New Jersey. Students from Rockleigh attend the high school as part of a sending/receiving relationship. The school joins Northern Valley Regional High School at Demarest as the two secondary schools that are part of the Northern Valley Regional High School District, which also serves students from Closter, Demarest and Haworth.

As of the 2024–25 school year, the school had an enrollment of 1,086 students and 106.6 classroom teachers (on an FTE basis), for a student–teacher ratio of 10.2:1. There were 14 students (1.3% of enrollment) eligible for free lunch and 0 (0.0% of students) eligible for reduced-cost lunch.

The high school is overseen by the New Jersey Department of Education and has been accredited by the Middle States Association of Colleges and Schools Commission on Elementary and Secondary Schools since 1965.

The high school runs a preschool program for children ages three to five. Program staff includes high school students who participate in the school's child development educational programs.

== History ==
After voters rejected a June 1959 referendum that would have raised $3.25 million for construction of the district's second high school in Old Tappan, voters narrowly approved a trimmed-down version of the plan in January 1960 that reduced the cost to $2.9 million (equivalent to $31.6 million in 2025).

The school was opened with 740 students in grades 9-11 in March 1962 to address overcrowding in the district's original school at Demarest that opened in 1955 and that had been holding split sessions until the new school opened. At its establishment, the school served students from Harrington Park, Northvale, Norwood and Old Tappan, as well as those from the northern portion of Closter.

== Awards, recognition and rankings ==
For the 1994-96 school years, Northern Valley Regional High School at Old Tappan was awarded the Blue Ribbon School Award of Excellence by the United States Department of Education, the highest award an American school can receive.

In the 2011 "Ranking America's High Schools" issue by The Washington Post, the school was ranked 29th in New Jersey and 1,051st nationwide. The school was ranked 829th, the 23rd-highest in New Jersey, in Newsweek magazine's 2010 rankings of America's Best High Schools.

In its 2013 report on "America's Best High Schools", The Daily Beast ranked the school 831st in the nation among participating public high schools and 61st among schools in New Jersey.

In its listing of "America's Best High Schools 2016", the school was ranked 227th out of the 500 best high schools in the country; it was ranked 37th among all high schools in New Jersey and 20th among the state's non-magnet schools.

The school was the 55th-ranked public high school in New Jersey out of 339 schools statewide in New Jersey Monthly magazine's September 2014 cover story on the state's "Top Public High Schools", using a new ranking methodology. The school had been ranked 53rd in the state of 328 schools in 2012, after being ranked 30th in 2010 out of 322 schools listed. The magazine ranked the school 18th in 2008 out of 316 schools. The school was ranked 25th in the magazine's September 2006 issue, which included 316 schools across the state.

Schooldigger.com ranked the school tied for 58th out of 381 public high schools statewide in its 2011 rankings (unchanged from the 2010 ranking) which were based on the combined percentage of students classified as proficient or above proficient on the mathematics (90.6%) and language arts literacy (97.5%) components of the High School Proficiency Assessment (HSPA).

== Extracurricular activities ==
=== Athletics ===
The school offers 60 co-curricular and intramural activities as well as over 23 sports, which include participation at the freshman, junior varsity, and varsity level (46 teams). The Northern Valley Regional High School at Old Tappan Golden Knights compete in the Big North Conference, which is comprised of public and private high schools in Bergen and Passaic counties and was established following a reorganization of sports leagues in Northern New Jersey by the New Jersey State Interscholastic Athletic Association. Before the NJSIAA's 2010 realignment, the school had competed in the North Bergen Interscholastic Athletic League. With 917 students in grades 10-12, the school was classified by the NJSIAA for the 2019–20 school year as Group III for most athletic competition purposes, which included schools with an enrollment of 761 to 1,058 students in that grade range. The football team competes in the Freedom Red division of the North Jersey Super Football Conference, which includes 112 schools competing in 20 divisions, making it the nation's biggest football-only high school sports league. The school was classified by the NJSIAA as Group III North for football for 2024–2026, which included schools with 700 to 884 students. There are cheerleading teams for both football and basketball. Cheerleading is both a fall and winter sport, and it includes after school gymnastic classes, competitions, and cheer camp.

The school participates in a girls' wrestling program with Northern Valley Regional High School at Demarest as the host school / lead agency, that operates under an agreement scheduled to expire in June 2029.

The girls' cross country team won the Group III state championship in 1979.

The girls' volleyball team won the Group III state championship in 1982 (vs. River Dell High School), 1983 (vs. Ramsey High School), 1985 (vs. Tenafly High School), 1986 (vs. Ramsey), 1987 (vs. Paramus High School), 1990 (vs. Pascack Valley High School), 1991 (vs. Tenafly), 1992 (vs. Ramapo), 2010 (vs. West Windsor-Plainsboro High School South), 2013 (vs. Northern Valley Regional High School at Demarest), 2015 (vs. Paramus), 2016 (vs. Mount Olive High School) and 2017 (vs. Wayne Valley High School); the team's 13 state titles are the third-most of any school in the state and the 21 appearances in group finals are tied for second statewide. The team has won the Tournament of Champions in 2010 (vs. Ramapo) and in 2015 and 2016 (vs. Immaculate Heart Academy both years). The 1982 team won the program's first title with a victory against River Dell in two games (16–14 and 15–8) in the tournament finals. The 1983 team won the Group III title for the second consecutive year, defeating Ramsey in the final match of the tournament in three games (15-12, 8-15 and 15-11). The 1985 team defeated Tenafly in the finals of the Group III tournament to finish the year at 19-3. Behind in both games, the team finished the season at 21-3 in 1986 after holding off Ramsey in two games (16-14 and 16-14) in the tournament final. The 1990 team finished the season with a record of 25–1 after winning the Group II title by defeating Pascack Valley in two games (15-3, 15-13) in the tournament final. The 2007 team won the NBIL league title ending with a record of 21–3. The 2010 team won the Tournament of Champions, having already won the county, sectional and Group III titles, earning recognition from The Record as having "proved that they're the best team in New Jersey." The finished the 2010–11 season with a record of 26–1, winning the Bergen County championship and the Group III state title, on their way to winning the program's first Tournament of Champions with a two-game sweep of Ramapo High School in the tournament final, 25-20 and 25–12.

The field hockey team won the North I Group III state sectional championship in 1982, 1985, 1989 and 1998.

The football team won the North I Group III state sectional championships in 1985 and won the North I Group IV title in both 2015 and 2017. The team won its first playoff title in 1985 with a 7–0 win against Wayne Valley High School. Moved up from Group III for 2015, the team won the North I Group IV title with a 17–0 win against Wayne Hills High School to finish with a 12–0 record, the program's first undefeated season. The 2017 football team finished undefeated, with a 12–0 record, capping off the season with a 31–28 win at MetLife Stadium against third-seeded Mount Olive High School in the final game of the North I Group IV state sectional tournament. In 2022, the football team won the Group III overall state championship, defeating Delsea Regional High School by a score of 24–14, in the first year the state had true group state champions.

The boys' basketball team won the 2006 North I, Group III tournament, defeating West Milford High School by a final score of 56–54. The 2010 team won the North I, Group III state sectional championship, defeating Teaneck High School in the tournament final by a final score of 49–47.

The 2008 baseball team won the North I, Group III sectional title over Montville High School before winning the school's first ever New Jersey Group III state championship with a 16–4 victory over Wall High School. The team repeated as North I, Group III sectional champions in 2009. In 2022, the team won the program's second Bergen County championship with a 9–7 win against defending champion Saint Joseph Regional High School.

The boys' track and field team won the 2011 NJSIAA Group III Championship 4 × 400 m relay, and continued to finish 3rd at the NJSIAA State Meet of Champions.

The boys' cross country team won the 2011 and 2012 league and county championships, as well as the North 1, Group III state sectional titles.

The boys' track team was the indoor track Group III co-champion in 2015.

The girls' basketball team won the Group III title in 2016 vs. Middletown High School South and in 2018 vs. Ewing High School. The 2007 team won the North I, Group III sectional championship, topping Teaneck High School 56–48 in the final game.

The boys' 2016 4 × 400 m relay team won the New Jersey State Meet of Champions, defeating East Orange Campus High School in a photo finish after the two teams finished with identical times. That same relay team was described by The Record as the best 4 × 400 m team in North Jersey history, a list that includes all public and private schools in the region.

The girls spring / outdoor track team won the Group III state championship in 2022.

=== Marching band ===
The school's marching band, “The Golden Knights Marching Band”, has seen great success in recent years, winning the title of US Bands Group II A State Champion for their 2021 show, "Scheherazade", US Bands Group II A National Champion for their 2022 show, "Kusama" and then US Bands Group III Open Class State Champion for their 2023 show, "Cathedral". The group competes at USBands regional competitions, performing at venues such as MetLife Stadium.

=== Clubs ===
This high school offers over 60 clubs for all students, providing diverse opportunities to explore their interests and talents. These clubs span various areas, including academic enrichment, sports, arts, culture, social justice and community involvement.

== Administration ==
The principal is Taylor West. Her core administrative team includes two assistant principals.

== Notable alumni ==
- Brooke Alexx (born 1994/95), singer-songwriter
- Craig Beardsley (born 1961), swimmer who held the world record for the 200m butterfly, but never swam at the Olympic level due to the boycott of the 1980 Summer Olympics in Moscow
- Cory Booker (born 1969), U.S. Senator from New Jersey and former Mayor of Newark, New Jersey
- P. J. Byrne (born 1974), film and television actor who has appeared in Horrible Bosses, Final Destination 5 and Wolf of Wall Street, as well as being the voice of Bolin on Nickelodeon's animated TV series The Legend of Korra
- Lenny Cooke (born 1982), former professional basketball player
- Brian Daley (1947-1996, class of 1965), science fiction novelist
- Devin Fuller (born 1994), wide receiver who played in the NFL for the Atlanta Falcons
- Jordan Fuller (born 1998), American football safety who has played in the NFL for the Los Angeles Rams
- Gregory Jacobs (born 1968), film director, producer and screenwriter, who has frequently collaborated with several film directors, most notably Steven Soderbergh
- Jeffrey Maier (born 1984), best known for deflecting a ball in play during Game 1 of the 1996 American League Championship Series between the New York Yankees and the Baltimore Orioles
- Frank Messina (born c. 1968), poet and author
- Mike Milo (born 1965, class of 1983), Emmy Award-winning animator, director, storyboard artist, writer and producer in the television industry
- Esmeralda Negron (born 1983), professional soccer player who played for the New Jersey Wildcats
- John O'Reilly (born 1995), professional baseball pitcher
- Dan Pasqua (born 1961), former MLB outfielder for the New York Yankees and Chicago White Sox
- Jon Rudnitsky (born 1989), comedian and cast member on Saturday Night Live
- Dianna Russini (born 1983), sports journalist on ESPN
- Angela Santomero (born c. 1968), television producer, co-creator of Blue's Clues
- Rob Segedin (born 1988), baseball player who played in MLB for the Los Angeles Dodgers
- Terese Terranova (born 1947), retired para table tennis player who won two gold medals at the 1988 Summer Paralympics

== See also ==
- Northern Valley Regional High School at Demarest, which serves students from Closter, Demarest and Haworth.
