= Northern Valley Regional High School at Demarest =

High school in Bergen County, New Jersey, US

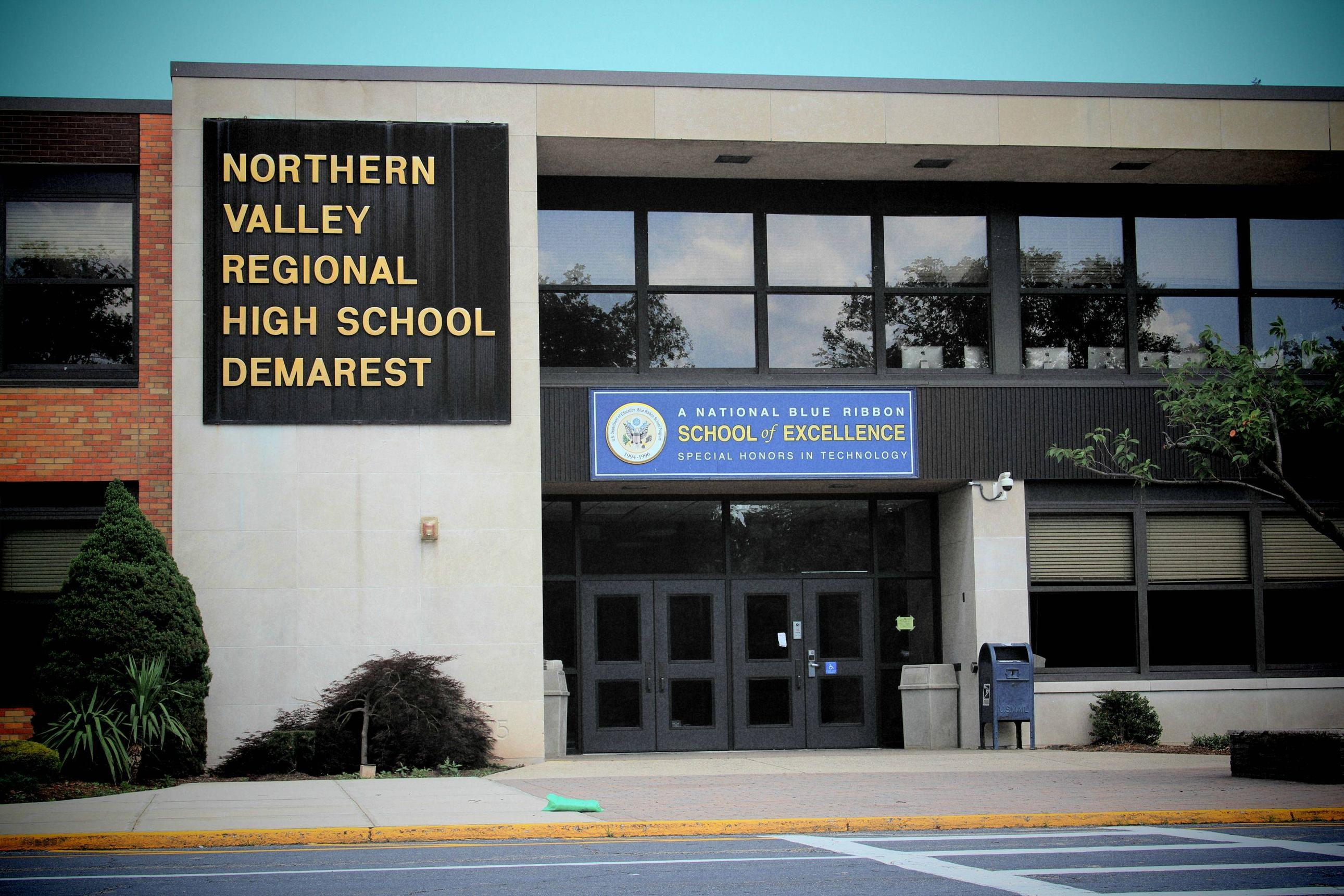

Location
- 150 Knickerbocker Road; Demarest, Bergen County, New Jersey 07627; United States; 40.962803°N 73.9737°W

Information
- Type: Public high school
- Established: 1955
- School district: Northern Valley Regional High School District
- NCES School ID: 341176000650
- Principal: Keith Johnson
- Faculty: 95.4 FTEs
- Grades: 9-12
- Enrollment: 1,038 (as of 2024–25)
- Student to teacher ratio: 10.9:1
- Colors: Royal blue White
- Athletics conference: Big North Conference (general); North Jersey Super Football Conference (football)
- Team name: Norsemen
- Publication: Runes (literary magazine)
- Newspaper: Northern Star
- Yearbook: Northern Lights
- Website: nvd.nvnet.org

Northern Valley Regional High School at Demarest (NV/Demarest) is a comprehensive four-year public high school serving students from several municipalities in Bergen County, in the U.S. state of New Jersey. The high school serves students from the suburban communities of Closter, Demarest, and Haworth. The school is one of two high schools that are part of the Northern Valley Regional High School District, the other being Northern Valley Regional High School at Old Tappan, which serves students from Harrington Park, Northvale, Norwood, and Old Tappan, along with students from Rockleigh, who attend as part of a sending/receiving relationship.

As of the 2024–25 school year, the school had an enrollment of 1,038 students and 95.4 classroom teachers (on an FTE basis), for a student–teacher ratio of 10.9:1. There were 11 students (1.1% of enrollment) eligible for free lunch and 2 (0.2% of students) eligible for reduced-cost lunch.

The high school is overseen by the New Jersey Department of Education and has been accredited by the Middle States Association of Colleges and Schools Commission on Elementary and Secondary Schools since 1959.

== History ==
The school opened in September 1955, serving all seven constituent municipalities, before which students attended Closter High School, Dumont High School or Tenafly High School.

== Awards, recognition and rankings ==
For the 1994-96 school years, Northern Valley Regional High School at Demarest was awarded the Blue Ribbon School Award of Excellence by the United States Department of Education, the highest award an American school can receive.

The school was the 42nd-ranked public high school in New Jersey out of 339 schools statewide in New Jersey Monthly magazine's September 2014 cover story on the state's "Top Public High Schools", using a new ranking methodology. The school had been ranked 34th in the state of 328 schools in 2012, after being ranked 14th in 2010 out of 322 schools listed. The magazine ranked the school 9th in 2008 out of 316 schools. The school was ranked 16th in the magazine's September 2006 issue, which included 316 schools across the state.

Schooldigger.com ranked the school tied for 23rd out of 381 public high schools statewide in its 2011 rankings (a decrease of 3 positions from the 2010 ranking) which were based on the combined percentage of students classified as proficient or above proficient on the mathematics (96.4%) and language arts literacy (98.2%) components of the High School Proficiency Assessment (HSPA).

In its listing of "America's Best High Schools 2016", the school was ranked 234th out of 500 best high schools in the country; it was ranked 39th among all high schools in New Jersey and 22nd among the state's non-magnet schools.

In its 2013 report on "America's Best High Schools", The Daily Beast ranked the school 351st in the nation among participating public high schools and 28th among schools in New Jersey.

In the 2011 "Ranking America's High Schools" issue by The Washington Post, the school was ranked 21st in New Jersey and 755th nationwide. The school was ranked 378th in Newsweek's 2009 ranking of the top 1,500 high schools in the United States and was the seventh-ranked school in New Jersey, with 2.364 AP tests taken in 2008 per graduating senior and 35% of all graduating seniors passing at least one AP exam; The school was ranked 1,166th nationwide in 2008. In Newsweek's 2007 rankings of the country's top 1,200 high schools, Northern Valley Regional High School at Demarest was listed in 1045th place, the 32nd-highest ranked school in New Jersey.

In the 2021 "Apple Distinguished Schools" issue by Apple, the school was recognized as an Apple Distinguished School.

== Athletics ==
The Northern Valley Regional High School at Demarest Norsemen compete in the Big North Conference, a super-conference comprised of public and private high schools in Bergen and Passaic counties established in 2009 as part of an effort to achieve greater competitive balance between schools, following a reorganization of sports leagues in Northern New Jersey by the New Jersey State Interscholastic Athletic Association. The school had previously competed in the North Bergen Interscholastic Athletic League, an athletic conference that consisted of high schools located in Bergen County. With 762 students in grades 10–12, the school was classified by the NJSIAA for the 2019–20 school year as Group III for most athletic competition purposes, which included schools with an enrollment of 761 to 1,058 students in that grade range. The football team competes in the Patriot Red division of the North Jersey Super Football Conference, which includes 112 schools competing in 20 divisions, making it the nation's biggest football-only high school sports league. The school was classified by the NJSIAA as Group III North for football for 2024–2026, which included schools with 700 to 884 students.

The school offers over 23 sports, which include participation at the freshman, junior varsity, and varsity level (46 teams), as well as 18 co-curricular activities. Sports include bowling, football and boys' and girls' basketball, and volleyball.

The school is the host school / lead agency for a girls' wrestling program with Northern Valley Regional High School at Old Tappan that operates under an agreement scheduled to expire in June 2029.

The boys' indoor track team was Group III champion in 1961 and won the Group II title in both 1964 and 1965.

The boys' tennis team won the Group III state championship in 1973 (defeating Princeton High School in the tournament final) and 1979 (vs. Summit High School). The 1973 team finished the season with a 22–3 record, which included defeating Princeton 4–1 in the tournament final for the Group III title. In 1997, the boys' tennis team went undefeated at 15–0 to claim the NBIL league championship, under head coach Dan Moses.

In 1977 and 2019, the boys' soccer team won the Bergen County championship.

The softball team won the Group III state title in 1979 (against runner-up Bridgeton High School in the finals of the playoffs) and won the Group II championship in 2016 (vs. Arthur L. Johnson High School). The 1979 team finished the season with a record of 25–2 after winning the Group II title defeating Bridgeton by a score of 3–2 in the championship game. The team won the 2016 Group II title with a 9–3 win in the tournament's final game against Arthur L. Johnson High School.

The field hockey team won the North I Group III state sectional final in 1984, 1992, 1994 and 2007. In 1997, the team won the Northeast Field Hockey League Championship and also the Bergen County Championship beating Northern Highlands Regional High School by a score of 1–0 in the tournament final. In 2007, the field hockey team won the North I, Group III state sectional championship with a 19–0 win over West Morris Central High School in the tournament final.

The girls' tennis team won the Group III state championship in 1989 (defeating Montville Township High School in the tournament's final match) and 2019 (vs. Holmdel High School). The 2019 team won the Group II title, defeating five-time defending champion by 4–1 at Mercer County Park in the final match of the tournament.

The football team won the North I Group III state sectional championship in 1992.

The baseball team won the Group III state championship in 1999 vs. Middletown High School South in the playoff final. The baseball team won three Bergen County Championships in years from 1991 to 1995.

The girls' volleyball team won the Group III state championship in 2000 (defeating Paramus Catholic High School in the last match of the tournament), 2001 (vs. Ramapo High School), 2002 (vs. Northern Valley Regional High School at Old Tappan), 2003 (vs. Old Tappan) and 2014 (vs. Old Tappan), and won the Group II title in 2006 (vs. Chatham High School), 2012 (vs. Sterling High School), 2018 (vs. Rutherford High School) and 2019 (vs. Rutherford); the program's 10 group titles are tied for fifth-most of any school in the state. The team won the inaugural Tournament of Champions in 2002 (vs. Cresskill High School) and repeated in 2003 (vs. James Caldwell High School) and 2006 (vs. Hunterdon Central High School). The 2000 team won the Group III championship, topping Paramus Catholic High School, 15-8 and 15–7. The 2001 team repeated, defeating Ramapo High School in the finals. The girls took the title again in 2003, over cross-district rival Northern Valley Regional High School at Old Tappan. The team took the 2006 Group II title over Chatham High School (25–17, 25–15). The 2001 team won the Group III state title over New Jersey State Interscholastic Athletic Association and lost in the Tournament of Champions final match to Immaculate Heart Academy, finishing the season with a 24–4 record. In 2012, the girls volleyball team won the state Group II championship in straight sets over Sterling High School, the program's eighth state group title.

The boys' basketball team won the 2004 North I, Group III title, edging Teaneck High School, 53–50.

The boys' swimming team won the Public C state championship in 2016–2019. Both swim teams won their respective North I Group B state titles in 2007, the girls defeating Kinnelon High School 103–67 in the finals and the boys topping Ramapo High School 104–66. The 2016 boys' swimming team won the state Group C championship, the program's first state title, topping Haddonfield Memorial High School 90–80 after going 13–0 in the season.

In 2018, the school's Ultimate Frisbee team, The Northern Valley Coalition, were ranked 5th statewide. In 2019, the team won the Division II New Jersey state championship.

== Music department ==
The music department presents five public concerts per academic year: The Fall Concert (October), The Holiday Concert (December), The Winter Instrumental Concert (March), The Spring Choral Concert (April), and The Awards Concert (June).

The Instrumental Department offers a Concert Band, Wind Symphony, Marching Band, Jazz Band, String Orchestra, Symphonic Orchestra, and Pit Orchestra. The department also has two instrumental jazz groups, the Jazz Band and the Jazz Ensemble.

The Vocal Department includes a Concert Choir and a Combined Choir. There are also two auditioned extracurricular ensembles, Valkyrie Voices (a select women's ensemble) and Barbershop, a men's choir.

The department has also won many awards, with all groups taking excellent or superior in their last music competition in Williamsburg, VA, competing against groups from all around America and Canada. The Marching Norsemen have also received many awards from the various competitions they have competed in, placing first in their class at all competitions of the 2025 season, and taking home the title of USBands New Jersey State Champions that same year. This victory was the first championship title the Marching Norsemen have achieved in school history.

Northern Valley Demarest additionally presents a Fall Play and Spring Musical annually.

== Notable alumni ==
- Lenny Cooke (born 1982), former professional basketball player
- Lisa Friel, former chief of the Manhattan District Attorney's Sex Crimes Prosecution Unit
- Elizabeth Gillies (born 1993), actress and singer known for her starring roles as Jade West in the Nickelodeon series Victorious and as Fallon Carrington on The CW revival of Dynasty
- Richard Hunt (1951–1992), actor and puppeteer, best known as a performer with the Muppets
- Alex Landi (born 1992), actor who has appeared on Grey's Anatomy and the Netflix original series Insatiable.
- Gregory T. Linteris (born 1957), scientist who flew as a payload specialist on two NASA Space Shuttle missions in 1997
- Sam Lipsyte (born 1968), author of Venus Drive, The Subject Steve and Home Land
- Ava Markham (born 1999), professional tennis player
- Regan Mizrahi (born 2000, class of 2018), actor and the voice of Boots the Monkey on Dora the Explorer
- Joey Pesce (born 1962), original keyboardist for 'Til Tuesday
- Simon Sinek (born 1973, class of 1991), motivational speaker and author of Start With Why: How Great Leaders Inspire Everyone to Take Action
- Trish Van Devere (born 1941, class of 1958), actress
- Tom Waddell (born 1958), former Major League Baseball right-handed pitcher who was one of only eight Scotland natives to ever play in the major leagues
- Gary Yost (born 1959), filmmaker, musician and software designer, best known for leading the team that created Autodesk 3ds Max

== See also ==
- Northern Valley Regional High School at Old Tappan, which serves students from Harrington Park, Northvale, Norwood, and Old Tappan. Students from Rockleigh attend the high school in Old Tappan as part of a sending/receiving relationship.

== Administration ==
The school's principal is Keith Johnson. His core administration team includes two assistant principals and the athletic director.
