= Orvil Township, New Jersey =

Former township in the United States

Coordinates: 40.989°N 74.082°W

Orvil Township was a township that existed in Bergen County, New Jersey, United States, from 1886 to 1919.

The township was created on January 1, 1886, from the western portion of Washington Township and the southern portion of Hohokus Township (now Mahwah). The township straddled both sides of the Saddle River, extending north to the New York state border and south to Ridgewood Township. The township was named for Orville James Victor, a journalist and author who lived in the area.

Boroughitis hit Orvil hard in 1894, with five new boroughs created from the nascent township. Montvale and Woodcliff (now Woodcliff Lake) were both formed on August 31, 1894. Allendale was incorporated on November 10, 1894, (referendum November 8, 1894) from portions of Orvil and from Franklin and Hohokus Townships. Saddle River was created by a referendum held on November 19, 1894 and incorporated on November 22, 1894. Upper Saddle River formed on November 22, 1894 (after a public referendum held on November 20, 1894) from area taken from both Orvil and Hohokus Townships.

A further portion of the township was taken to create the borough of Orvil (now Ho-Ho-Kus) on March 8, 1905.

On April 7, 1919, a council of citizens voted to incorporate as the borough of Waldwick from the remaining portions of Orvil Township. With the creation of the borough of Waldwick, Orvil Township was dissolved, after 33 years in existence.
