= Allendale, New Jersey =

Borough in Bergen County, New Jersey, US

- Borough
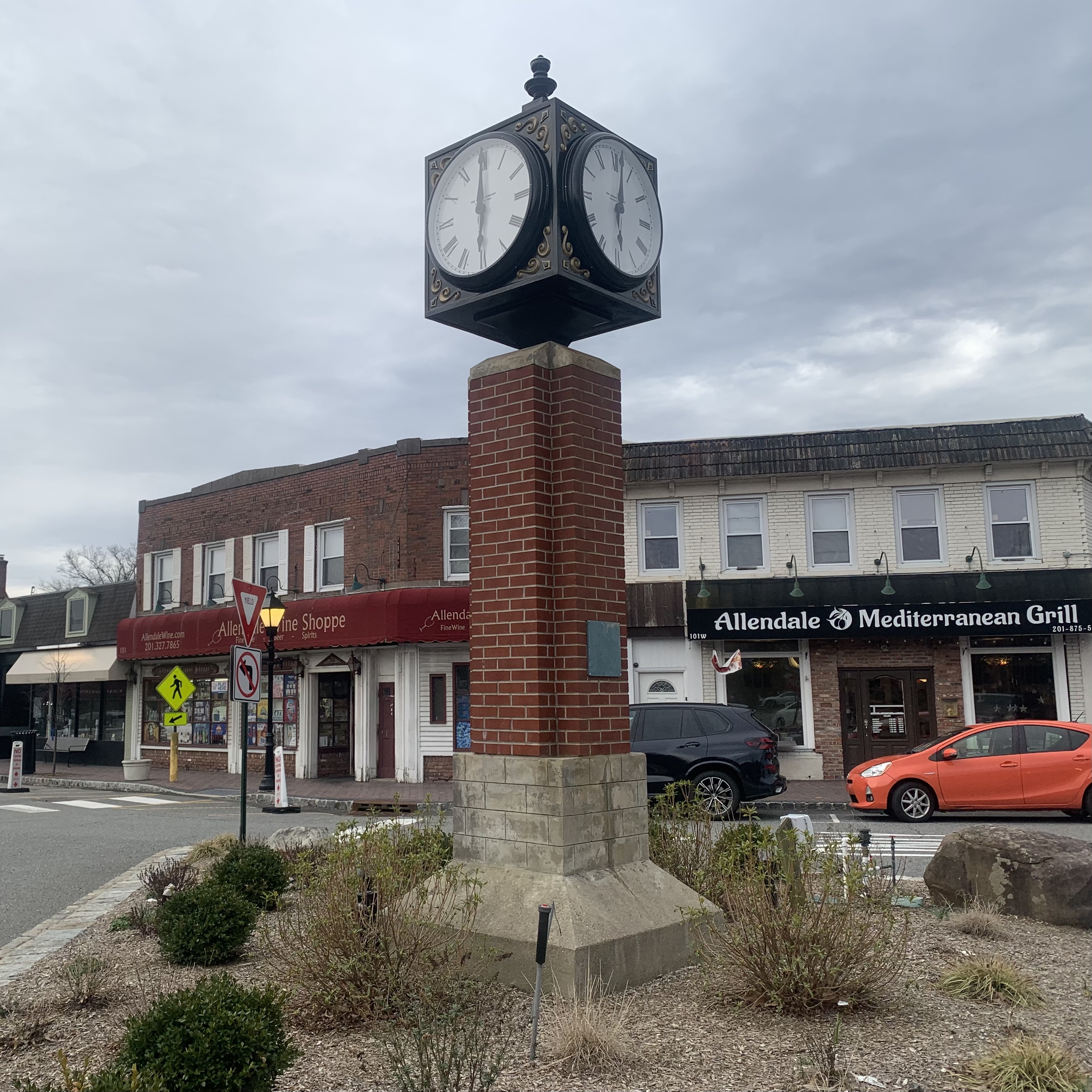
- Allendale Clocktower

- Seal
- Interactive map of Allendale, New Jersey
- Location in Bergen County Location in New Jersey Location in the United States
- Coordinates: 41.032669°N 74.133826°W
- Country: United States
- State: New Jersey
- County: Bergen
- Incorporated: November 8, 1894
- Named after: Joseph Warner Allen

Government
  - Type: Borough
  - Body: Borough Council
  - Mayor: Amy E. Wilczynski (R, term ends December 31, 2026)
  - Municipal clerk: Linda L. Cervino

Area
  - Total: 3.12 sq mi (8.08 km^{2})
  - Land: 3.10 sq mi (8.02 km^{2})
  - Water: 0.019 sq mi (0.05 km^{2}) 0.67%
  - Rank: 328th of 565 in state 25th of 70 in county
- Elevation: 292 ft (89 m)

Population (2020)
  - Total: 6,848
  - Estimate (2023): 6,791
  - Rank: 323rd of 565 in state 53rd of 70 in county
  - Density: 2,211.2/sq mi (853.7/km^{2})
  - Rank: 279th of 565 in state 55th of 70 in county
- Time zone: UTC−05:00 (Eastern (EST))
  - Summer (DST): UTC−04:00 (Eastern (EDT))
- ZIP Code: 07401
- Area codes: 201
- FIPS code: 3400300700
- GNIS feature ID: 0885135
- Website: www.allendalenj.gov

Allendale is a borough in Bergen County, in the U.S. state of New Jersey. As of the 2020 United States census, the borough's population was 6,848, the highest recorded in any decennial count and an increase of 343 (+5.3%) from the 2010 census count of 6,505, which in turn reflected a decline of 194 (−2.9%) from the 6,699 counted in 2000.

In 2012, Forbes.com listed Allendale as 481st in its listing of "America's Most Expensive ZIP Codes", with a median home price of $579,081.

== History ==
In 1888, Henry J. Appert, a Swiss immigrant, drained a bog for the cultivation of onions and celery. The business—Allendale Produce Gardens, or the "celery farm" to locals—supplied wholesale markets and Campbell Soup Company. Allendale was formed on November 8, 1894, from portions of Franklin Township (remainder now Wyckoff), Hohokus Township (remainder now Mahwah) and Orvil Township (remainder now Waldwick).

The borough was formed during the "Boroughitis" phenomenon then sweeping through Bergen County, in which 26 boroughs were formed in the county in 1894 alone. The borough was named for Joseph Warner Allen, a surveyor for the Erie Railroad.

Babe Ruth would frequently vacation at the Allendale Hotel, which remains in use as a rooming house.

== Geography ==
According to the United States Census Bureau, the borough had a total area of 3.12 square miles (8.08 km^{2}), including 3.10 square miles (8.02 km^{2}) of land and 0.02 square miles (0.05 km^{2}) of water (0.67%).

The borough borders the Bergen County municipalities of Mahwah, Ramsey, Saddle River, Waldwick and Wyckoff.

As of 2026, the borough is a member of Local Leaders for Responsible Planning in order to address the borough's Mount Laurel doctrine-based housing obligations.

== Demographics ==
Historical population
Census	Pop.	Note	%±
1900	694		—
1910	937		35.0%
1920	1,165		24.3%
1930	1,730		48.5%
1940	2,058		19.0%
1950	2,409		17.1%
1960	4,092		69.9%
1970	6,240		52.5%
1980	5,901		−5.4%
1990	5,900		0.0%
2000	6,699		13.5%
2010	6,505		−2.9%
2020	6,848		5.3%
2023 (est.)	6,791	▼	−0.8%
Population sources: 1900–1920; 1900–1910 1910–1930; 1900–2020 2000; 2010 2020

=== Racial and ethnic composition ===
Allendale borough, Bergen County, New Jersey – Racial and ethnic composition Note: the US Census treats Hispanic/Latino as an ethnic category. This table excludes Latinos from the racial categories and assigns them to a separate category. Hispanics/Latinos may be of any race.
Race / Ethnicity (NH = Non-Hispanic)	Pop 2000	Pop 2010	Pop 2020	% 2000	% 2010	% 2020
White alone (NH)	6,049	5,450	5,261	90.30%	83.78%	76.83%
Black or African American alone (NH)	26	29	42	0.39%	0.45%	0.61%
Native American or Alaska Native alone (NH)	4	0	1	0.06%	0.00%	0.01%
Asian alone (NH)	408	624	837	6.09%	9.59%	12.22%
Native Hawaiian or Pacific Islander alone (NH)	0	0	2	0.00%	0.00%	0.03%
Other race alone (NH)	11	12	22	0.16%	0.18%	0.32%
Mixed race or Multiracial (NH)	31	86	227	0.46%	1.32%	3.31%
Hispanic or Latino (any race)	170	304	456	2.54%	4.67%	6.66%
Total	6,699	6,505	6,848	100.00%	100.00%	100.00%

=== 2020 census ===
As of the 2020 census, Allendale had a population of 6,848. The median age was 45.6 years. 23.8% of residents were under the age of 18 and 19.5% of residents were 65 years of age or older. For every 100 females there were 92.6 males, and for every 100 females age 18 and over there were 88.4 males age 18 and over.

100.0% of residents lived in urban areas, while 0.0% lived in rural areas.

There were 2,327 households in Allendale, of which 39.1% had children under the age of 18 living in them. Of all households, 69.9% were married-couple households, 9.2% were households with a male householder and no spouse or partner present, and 18.8% were households with a female householder and no spouse or partner present. About 16.5% of all households were made up of individuals and 9.3% had someone living alone who was 65 years of age or older.

There were 2,450 housing units, of which 5.0% were vacant. The homeowner vacancy rate was 0.6% and the rental vacancy rate was 14.6%.

=== 2010 census ===
The 2010 United States census counted 6,505 people, 2,236 households, and 1,798 families in the borough. The population density was 2,100.7 per square mile (811.1/km^{2}). There were 2,388 housing units at an average density of 771.2 per square mile (297.8/km^{2}). The racial makeup was 87.41% (5,686) White, 0.51% (33) Black or African American, 0.05% (3) Native American, 9.64% (627) Asian, 0.00% (0) Pacific Islander, 0.83% (54) from other races, and 1.57% (102) from two or more races. Hispanic or Latino of any race were 4.67% (304) of the population.

Of the 2,236 households, 42.8% had children under the age of 18; 70.8% were married couples living together; 8.1% had a female householder with no husband present and 19.6% were non-families. Of all households, 17.5% were made up of individuals and 10.9% had someone living alone who was 65 years of age or older. The average household size was 2.86 and the average family size was 3.25.

28.4% of the population were under the age of 18, 5.8% from 18 to 24, 18.6% from 25 to 44, 32.7% from 45 to 64, and 14.5% who were 65 years of age or older. The median age was 43.5 years. For every 100 females, the population had 93.4 males. For every 100 females ages 18 and older there were 89.0 males.

The Census Bureau's 2006–2010 American Community Survey showed that (in 2010 inflation-adjusted dollars) median household income was $131,563 (with a margin of error of +/− $22,630) and the median family income was $150,268 (+/− $26,670). Males had a median income of $121,089 (+/− $19,180) versus $71,534 (+/− $36,833) for females. The per capita income for the borough was $60,466 (+/− $8,969). About 1.0% of families and 1.0% of the population were below the poverty line, including none of those under age 18 and 6.5% of those age 65 or over.

Same-sex couples headed 17 households in 2010, an increase from the 1 counted in 2000.

=== 2000 census ===
As of the 2000 United States census there were 6,699 people, 2,110 households, and 1,795 families residing in the borough. The population density was 2,143.9 inhabitants per square mile (827.8/km^{2}). There were 2,143 housing units at an average density of 685.8 per square mile (264.8/km^{2}). The racial makeup of the borough was 92.48% White, 0.39% African American, 0.06% Native American, 6.09% Asian, 0.46% from other races, and 0.52% from two or more races. Hispanic or Latino of any race were 2.54% of the population.

There were 2,110 households, out of which 47.4% had children under the age of 18 living with them, 77.5% were married couples living together, 6.1% had a female householder with no husband present, and 14.9% were non-families. 13.1% of all households were made up of individuals, and 5.5% had someone living alone who was 65 years of age or older. The average household size was 3.03 and the average family size was 3.33.

In the borough the population was spread out, with 30.4% under the age of 18, 4.2% from 18 to 24, 25.9% from 25 to 44, 25.4% from 45 to 64, and 14.1% who were 65 years of age or older. The median age was 40 years. For every 100 females, there were 93.9 males. For every 100 females age 18 and over, there were 86.8 males.

The median income for a household in the borough was $105,704, and the median income for a family was $113,390. Males had a median income of $88,210 versus $50,781 for females. The per capita income for the borough was $47,772. About 1.6% of families and 1.8% of the population were below the poverty line, including 2.7% of those under age 18 and none of those age 65 or over.

== Culture ==
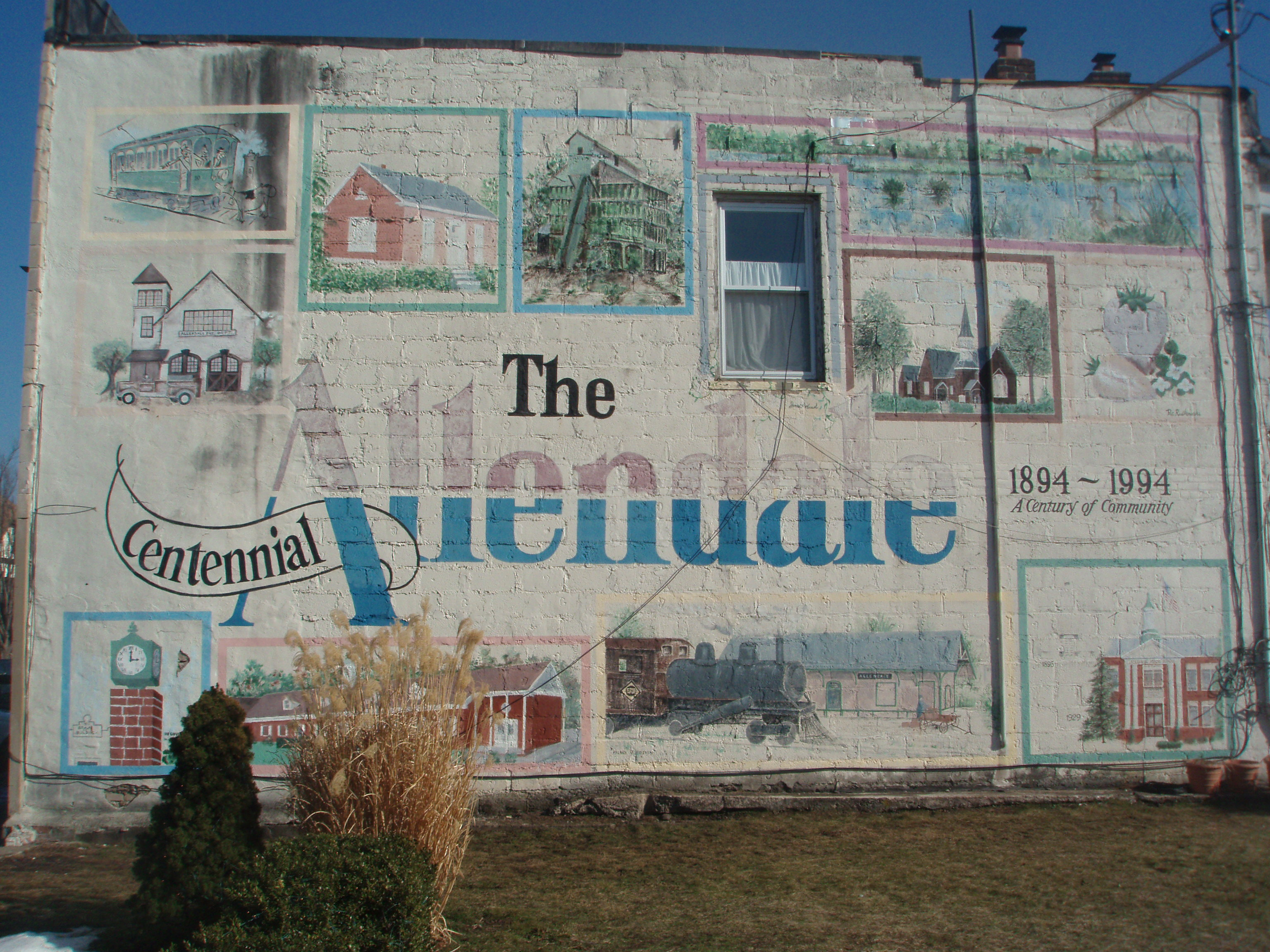
Building In Allendale covered with artwork by local artists

Allendale is home to the Celery Farm, a nature preserve that is home to hundreds of animals, including fox, deer, rabbits, frogs, turtles, rodents, and most notably exotic birds. Many rare birds have been observed by ornithologists including bald eagles, common ravens, and pileated woodpeckers. A full list of birds and their frequency of appearance can be found online.

There is a variety of recreation opportunities throughout the borough, including Crestwood Park, which covers 71 acres (29 ha) and includes a man-made lake with three diving boards, three beaches, and six swim lanes. Included in the Park is a recreational barn, three baseball / softball fields, two soccer / football fields, a lacrosse field, and four tennis courts.

Several episodes of the television show Ed were filmed in Allendale, including a Thanksgiving Day Parade episode. Scenes from the movie Presumed Innocent, starring Harrison Ford and Bonnie Bedelia, were filmed in Allendale.

== Government ==
=== Local government ===
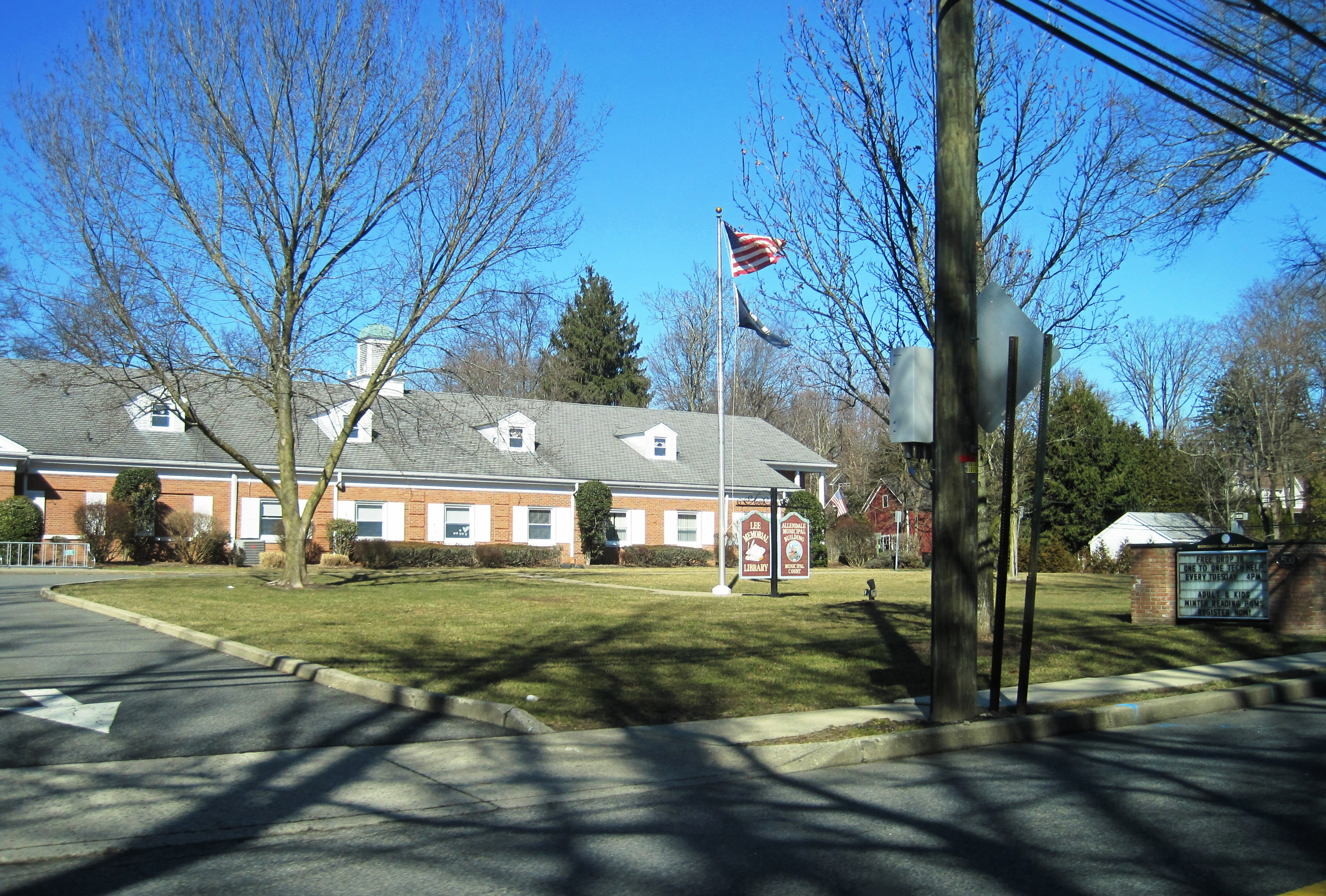
Allendale municipal building

Allendale is governed under the borough form of New Jersey municipal government, which is used in 218 municipalities (of the 564) statewide, making it the most common form of government in New Jersey. The governing body is comprised of a mayor and a borough council, with all positions elected at-large on a partisan basis as part of the November general election. A mayor is elected directly by the voters to a four-year term of office. The borough council includes six members elected to serve three-year terms on a staggered basis, with two seats coming up for election each year in a three-year cycle. The borough form of government used by Allendale is a "weak mayor / strong council" government in which council members act as the legislative body with the mayor presiding at meetings and voting only in the event of a tie. The mayor can veto ordinances subject to an override by a two-thirds majority vote of the council. The mayor makes committee and liaison assignments for council members, and most appointments are made by the mayor with the advice and consent of the council. The mayor and borough council conduct all of their business during monthly meetings open to the public. All Legislative powers of the borough are exercised by the mayor and council. These powers can take the form of a resolution, ordinance or proclamation. The mayor presides at all meetings of the council. At Workshop meetings, the governing body discusses and debates proposed resolutions, ordinances and other policy matters. These meetings are open to the public, and members of the public may participate at an appropriate time at the meeting.

As of 2026, the mayor of Allendale is Republican Amy E. Wilczynski, whose term of office ends December 31, 2026. Members of the Borough Council are Council President Susanne C. Lovisolo (R, 2027), Joseph Daloisio (R, 2026), Elizabeth C. "Liz" Homan (R, 2027), Edward O'Connell (R, 2026), Matthew J. O'Toole (R, 2028) and Tyler Yaccarino (R, 2028).

In January 2019, the borough council appointed Matthew O'Toole to fill the seat expiring in December 2019 that had been held by Ari Bernstein until he resigned to take office as mayor.

In January 2015, the borough council selected Liz Homan to fill Liz White's vacant council seat on an interim basis until the November 2015 general election.

=== Federal, state and county representation ===
Allendale is located in the 5th Congressional District and is part of New Jersey's 39th state legislative district.

For the 119th United States Congress, New Jersey's 5th congressional district is represented by Josh Gottheimer (D, Wyckoff). New Jersey is represented in the United States Senate by Democrats Cory Booker (Newark, term ends 2027) and Andy Kim (Moorestown, term ends 2031).

For the 2026–2027 session, the 39th legislative district of the New Jersey Legislature is represented in the State Senate by Holly Schepisi (R, River Vale) and in the General Assembly by Robert Auth (R, Old Tappan) and John V. Azzariti (R, Saddle River).

Bergen County is governed by a directly elected County Executive, with legislative functions performed by a Board of County Commissioners comprised of seven members who are elected at-large to three-year terms in partisan elections on a staggered basis, with either two or three seats coming up for election each November; a Chairman and Vice Chairman are selected from among its seven members at a reorganization meeting held every January. As of 2025, the county executive is James J. Tedesco III (D, Paramus), whose four-year term of office ends December 31, 2026.

Bergen County's Commissioners are Chair Mary J. Amoroso (D, Mahwah, 2025), Vice Chair Steven A. Tanelli (D, North Arlington, 2027), Chair Pro Tem Joan Voss (D, Fort Lee, 2026), Rafael Marte (D, Bergenfield, 2026), Germaine M. Ortiz (D, Emerson, 2025), Thomas J. Sullivan Jr. (D, Montvale, 2025) and Tracy Silna Zur (D, Franklin Lakes, 2027).

Bergen County's elected constitutional officials are Clerk John S. Hogan (D, Northvale, 2026), Sheriff Anthony Cureton (D, Englewood, 2027) and Surrogate Michael R. Dressler (D, Cresskill, 2026).

=== Politics ===
Presidential election results

United States presidential election results for Allendale
Year	Republican		Democratic		Third party(ies)	
Year	No.	%	No.	%	No.	%
2024	1,877	47.68%	2,008	51.00%	52	1.32%
2020	1,945	43.30%	2,458	54.72%	89	1.98%
2016	1,756	47.34%	1,759	47.43%	194	5.23%
2012	2,057	60.38%	1,322	38.80%	28	0.82%
2008	2,033	56.61%	1,537	42.80%	21	0.58%
2004	2,108	59.58%	1,398	39.51%	32	0.90%
2000	1,944	58.68%	1,249	37.70%	120	3.62%
1996	1,783	56.86%	1,114	35.52%	239	7.62%
1992	1,810	55.95%	971	30.02%	454	14.03%
1988	2,269	72.63%	844	27.02%	11	0.35%
1984	2,418	76.93%	720	22.91%	5	0.16%
1980	1,951	64.56%	601	19.89%	470	15.55%
1976	2,098	71.63%	771	26.32%	60	2.05%
1972	2,204	76.69%	641	22.30%	29	1.01%
1968	1,946	71.02%	695	25.36%	99	3.61%
1964	1,296	56.52%	992	43.26%	5	0.22%
1960	1,522	76.83%	457	23.07%	2	0.10%

As of March 2011, there were a total of 4,537 registered voters in Allendale, of which 860 (19.0% vs. 31.7% countywide) were registered as Democrats, 1,690 (37.2% vs. 21.1%) were registered as Republicans and 1,983 (43.7% vs. 47.1%) were registered as Unaffiliated. There were 4 voters registered as Libertarians or Greens. Among the borough's 2010 Census population, 69.7% (vs. 57.1% in Bergen County) were registered to vote, including 97.4% of those ages 18 and over (vs. 73.7% countywide).

Gubernatorial election results for Allendale
Year	Republican		Democratic		Third party(ies)	
Year	No.	%	No.	%	No.	%
2025	1,791	53.35%	1,560	46.47%	6	0.18%
2021	1,488	53.62%	1,273	45.87%	14	0.50%
2017	1,232	53.92%	1,013	44.33%	40	1.75%
2013	1,524	73.45%	517	24.92%	34	1.64%
2009	1,415	60.06%	795	33.74%	146	6.20%
2005	1,407	58.77%	950	39.68%	37	1.55%

In the 2020 presidential election, Democrat Joseph Biden received 2,458 votes (54.7%), ahead of Republican Donald Trump with 1,945 votes (43.3%), and other candidates with 89 votes (2.0%), among the 4,492 ballots cast. In the 2016 presidential election, Democrat Hillary Clinton received 1,759 votes (47.4% vs. 54.2% countywide), ahead of Republican Donald Trump with 1,756 votes (47.3% vs. 41.1% countywide) and other candidates with 194 votes (5.2% vs 2.9% countywide), among the 3,773 ballots cast by the borough's 5,162 registered voters for a turnout of 73.1% (vs. 73% in Bergen County). In the 2012 presidential election, Republican Mitt Romney received 2,057 votes (60.3% vs. 43.5% countywide), ahead of Democrat Barack Obama with 1,322 votes (38.7% vs. 54.8%) and other candidates with 25 votes (0.7% vs. 0.9%), among the 3,413 ballots cast by the borough's 4,834 registered voters, for a turnout of 70.6% (vs. 70.4% in Bergen County). In the 2008 presidential election, Republican John McCain received 2,033 votes (56.4% vs. 44.5% countywide), ahead of Democrat Barack Obama with 1,537 votes (42.7% vs. 53.9%) and other candidates with 16 votes (0.4% vs. 0.8%), among the 3,602 ballots cast by the borough's 4,613 registered voters, for a turnout of 78.1% (vs. 76.8% in Bergen County). In the 2004 presidential election, Republican George W. Bush received 2,108 votes (59.5% vs. 47.2% countywide), ahead of Democrat John Kerry with 1,398 votes (39.4% vs. 51.7%) and other candidates with 32 votes (0.9% vs. 0.7%), among the 3,545 ballots cast by the borough's 4,458 registered voters, for a turnout of 79.5% (vs. 76.9% in the whole county).

In the 2017 gubernatorial election, Republican Kim Guadagno received 53.9% of the vote (1,232 cast), ahead of Democrat Phil Murphy with 44.3% (1,013 votes), and other candidates with 1.8% (40 votes), among the 2,321 ballots cast by the borough's 4,892 registered voters (36 ballots were spoiled), for a turnout of 47.4%. In the 2013 gubernatorial election, Republican Chris Christie received 73.4% of the vote (1,524 cast), ahead of Democrat Barbara Buono with 24.9% (517 votes), and other candidates with 1.6% (34 votes), among the 2,104 ballots cast by the borough's 4,648 registered voters (29 ballots were spoiled), for a turnout of 45.3%. In the 2009 gubernatorial election, Republican Chris Christie received 1,415 votes (59.5% vs. 45.8% countywide), ahead of Democrat Jon Corzine with 795 votes (33.4% vs. 48.0%), Independent Chris Daggett with 137 votes (5.8% vs. 4.7%) and other candidates with 9 votes (0.4% vs. 0.5%), among the 2,378 ballots cast by the borough's 4,557 registered voters, yielding a 52.2% turnout (vs. 50.0% in the county).

United States Senate election results for Allendale1
Year	Republican		Democratic		Third party(ies)	
Year	No.	%	No.	%	No.	%
2024	1,832	48.47%	1,894	50.11%	54	1.43%
2018	1,640	56.15%	1,202	41.15%	79	2.70%
2012	1,916	60.42%	1,217	38.38%	38	1.20%
2006	1,433	59.83%	934	39.00%	28	1.17%

United States Senate election results for Allendale2
Year	Republican		Democratic		Third party(ies)	
Year	No.	%	No.	%	No.	%
2020	2,033	46.27%	2,312	52.62%	49	1.12%
2014	1,162	55.70%	896	42.95%	28	1.34%
2013	795	55.17%	639	44.34%	7	0.49%
2008	1,990	59.99%	1,292	38.95%	35	1.06%

== Education ==
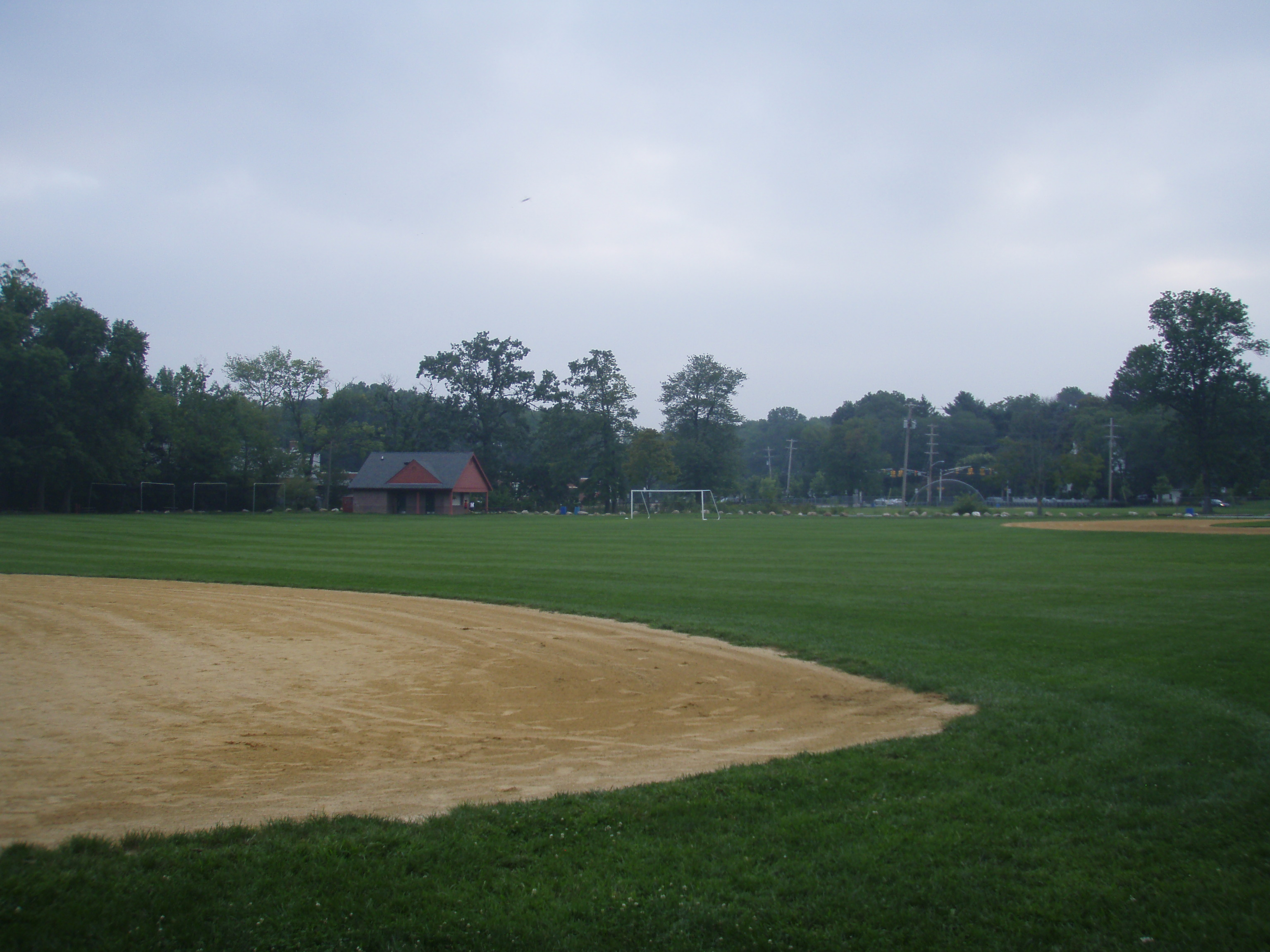
The field at Brookside School

The Allendale School District serves public school students in pre-kindergarten through eighth grade. As of the 2020–21 school year, the district, comprised of two schools, had an enrollment of 859 students and 69.0 classroom teachers (on an FTE basis), for a student–teacher ratio of 12.4:1. Schools in the district (with 2020–21 enrollment data from the National Center for Education Statistics.) are Hillside School with 343 students in pre-kindergarten to 3rd grade and Brookside School with 506 students from 4th to 8th grades.

Public school students in Allendale for ninth through twelfth grades attend Northern Highlands Regional High School, which also serves students from Ho-Ho-Kus, Upper Saddle River and some of Saddle River's students (who have the option of attending either Northern Highlands or Ramsey High School, as part of sending/receiving relationships with the two districts). As of the 2020–21 school year, the high school had an enrollment of 1,364 students and 106.3 classroom teachers (on an FTE basis), for a student–teacher ratio of 12.8:1. New Jersey Monthly magazine ranked the high school as the 22nd-best of 328 ranked schools in New Jersey in its 2012 rankings of the "Top Public High Schools" after being ranked 6th of 322 schools in 2010. The ten voting seats on the high school district's board of education are allocated based on a percentage of the enrollment coming from each constituent municipality, with four seats allocated to Allendale.

Public school students from the borough, and all of Bergen County, are eligible to attend the secondary education programs offered by the Bergen County Technical Schools, which include the Bergen County Academies in Hackensack, and the Bergen Tech campus in Teterboro or Paramus. The district offers programs on a shared-time or full-time basis, with admission based on a selective application process and tuition covered by the student's home school district.

== Transportation ==
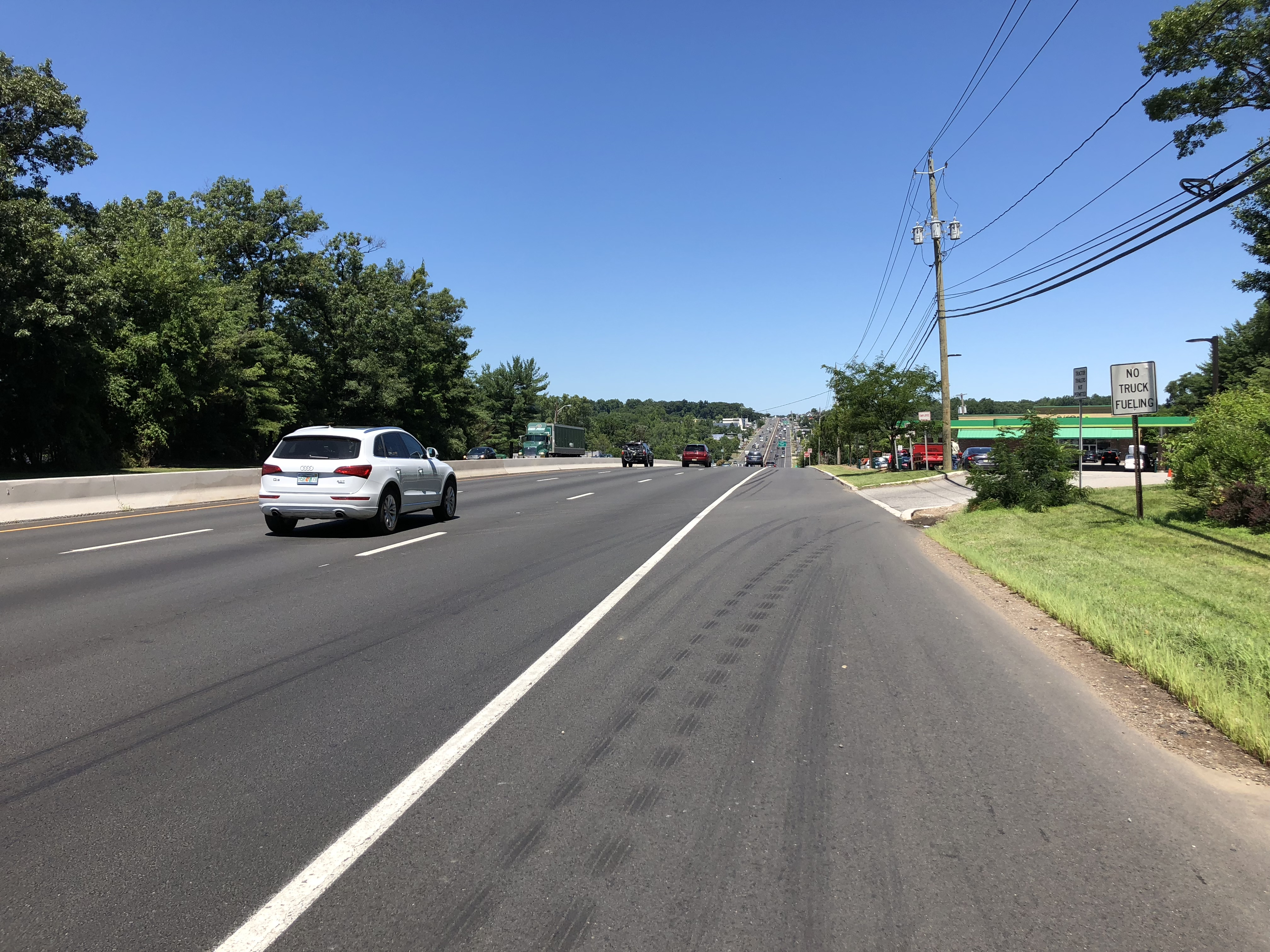
Route 17 northbound in Allendale

=== Roads and highways ===
As of May 2010, the borough had a total of 33.47 miles (53.86 km) of roadways, of which 24.99 miles (40.22 km) were maintained by the municipality, 8.10 miles (13.04 km) by Bergen County and 0.38 miles (0.61 km) by the New Jersey Department of Transportation.

A small section of Route 17 passes through the far eastern edge of Allendale. The main roads in Allendale are Franklin Turnpike, Allendale Avenue, Brookside Avenue, and Crescent Avenue.

Interstate 287 is accessible in Franklin Lakes and the neighboring township of Mahwah.

=== Public transportation ===
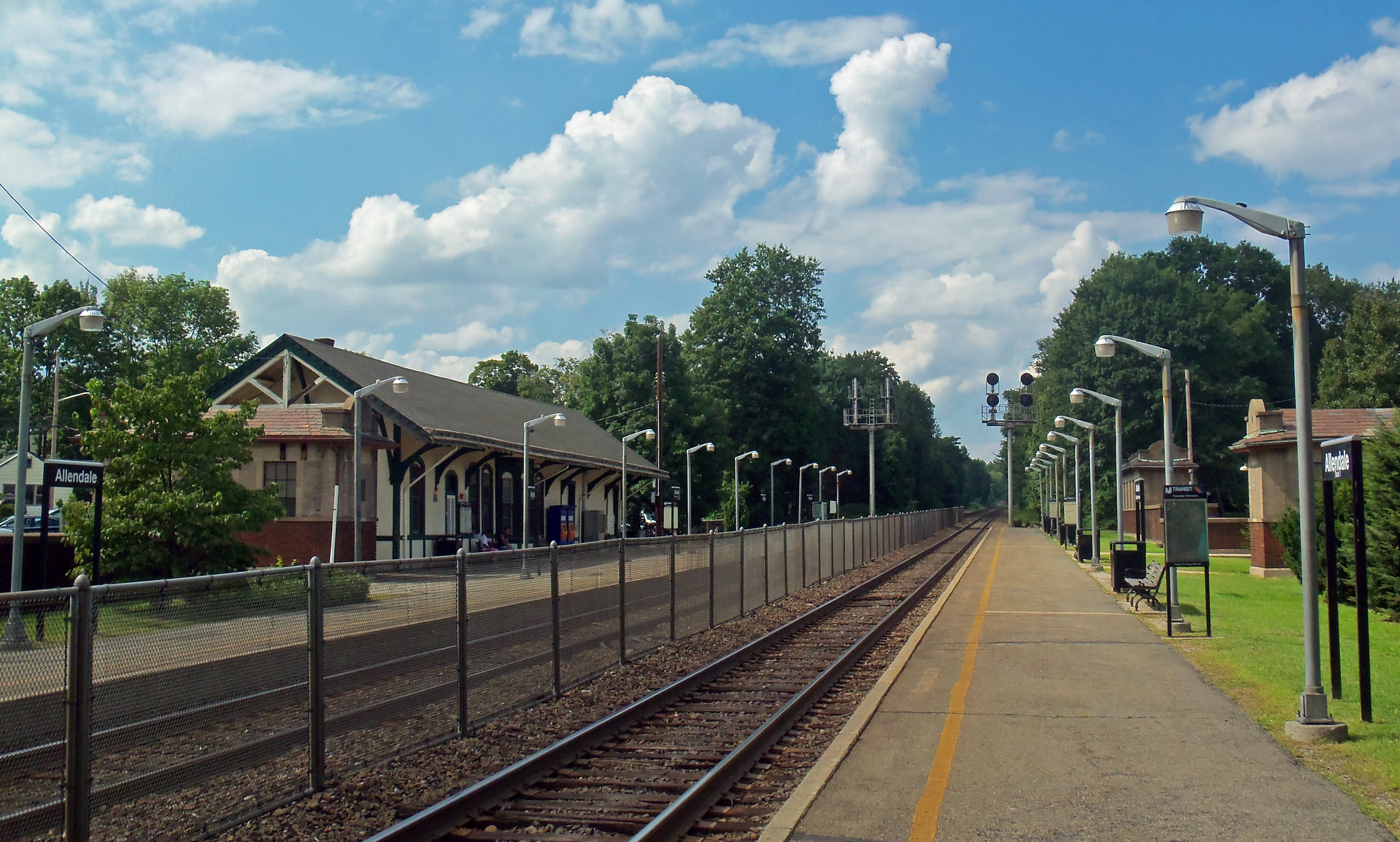
The Allendale New Jersey Transit Station is served by both Main Line and Bergen County Line trains.

NJ Transit provides train service at the Allendale station located at Allendale Avenue, Myrtle Avenue and Park Avenue. There are two ticket vending machines and a shelter at the southbound platform, with an underpass to transfer between the northbound and southbound platforms. The station provides service on both Main Line and Bergen County Line trains. The lines offer service to Hoboken Terminal, with transfers available at Secaucus Junction to New York Penn Station in Midtown Manhattan and to most of New Jersey Transit's other train lines.

Coach USA / Short Line offers bus service between Allendale and the Port Authority Bus Terminal in Midtown Manhattan.

There is no NJ Transit bus service in Allendale.

== Sister city ==
Allendale is a sister city of Ōmachi, Saga in Japan.

== Notable people ==
People who were born in, residents of, or otherwise closely associated with Allendale include:

- Jim Burt (born 1959), professional football player
- Phillip Chorba (born 1983), actor who has appeared in Silver Linings Playbook and Concussion
- James Comey (born 1960), former director of the Federal Bureau of Investigation
- John Fell (1721–1798), judge and member of the Continental Congress
- Richard Matheson (1926–2013), author and screenwriter
- Marion Clyde McCarroll (1891–1977), writer and journalist who was the first woman issued a press pass by the New York Stock Exchange and also penned "Advice for the Lovelorn," the nationally syndicated column she inherited from Dorothy Dix
- Patricia Peardon (1923/24-1993), actress who originated the title role in the Broadway play Junior Miss.
- Lou Piniella (born 1943), former baseball player and manager
- J. Parnell Thomas (1895–1970), Congressman who served as Mayor of Allendale from 1926 to 1930
- Tony Vlachos (born 1973), winner of Survivor: Cagayan and Survivor: Winners at War
- Chris Wylde (born 1976), actor and comedian

== Sources ==
- Municipal Incorporations of the State of New Jersey (according to Counties) prepared by the Division of Local Government, Department of the Treasury (New Jersey); December 1, 1958.
- History of Bergen and Passaic Counties, New Jersey, with Biographical Sketches of Many of its Pioneers and Prominent Men., Philadelphia: Everts and Peck, 1882.
- Harvey, Cornelius Burnham (ed.), Genealogical History of Hudson and Bergen Counties, New Jersey. New York: New Jersey Genealogical Publishing Co., 1900.
- Van Valen, James M. History of Bergen County, New Jersey. New York: New Jersey Publishing and Engraving Co., 1900.
- Westervelt, Frances A. (Frances Augusta), 1858–1942, History of Bergen County, New Jersey, 1630–1923, Lewis Historical Publishing Company, 1923.
