= Hohokus Township, New Jersey =

Coordinates: 41.10°N 74.14°W

Hohokus Township was a township that existed in Bergen County, New Jersey and was established in 1849 from the northern part of Franklin Township and extended from the Saddle River on the east to the western boundary of Bergen County with Passaic County and north to the New York border.

Hohokus Township was first subdivided in 1886 with the creation of Orvil Township on both sides of the Saddle River, consisting of the eastern portion of Hohokus Township and the western portion of Washington Township.

1894's outbreak of "Boroughitis" brought the creation of the Boroughs of Allendale and Upper Saddle River, both of which were created from portions of both Hohokus and Orvil Townships. Next to leave the fold was Ramsey, which was created in 1908.

Hohokus Township ceased to exist on November 7, 1944, when a referendum was passed creating Mahwah Township from the remaining portions of Hohokus Township.

== Sources ==
- "History of Bergen County, New Jersey, 1630-1923;" by "Westervelt, Frances A. (Frances Augusta), 1858-1942."
- "Municipal Incorporations of the State of New Jersey (according to Counties)" prepared by the Division of Local Government, Department of the Treasury (New Jersey); December 1, 1958.
