= Allendale School District =

School district in Bergen County, New Jersey, US

Address
- 100 Brookside Avenue Allendale, Bergen County, New Jersey, 07401; United States
- Coordinates: 41.029064°N 74.136664°W

District information
- Grades: PreK-8
- Superintendent: Michael J. Barcadepone
- Business administrator: Maria L. Engeleit
- Schools: 2

Students and staff
- Enrollment: 859 (as of 2020–21)
- Faculty: 69.0 FTEs
- Student–teacher ratio: 12.4:1

Other information
- District Factor Group: I
- Website: www.allendalek8.com
Ind.	Per pupil	District spending	Rank (*)	K-8 average	%± vs. average
1A	Total Spending	$16,576	29	$18,891	−12.3%
1	Budgetary Cost	16,365	80	14,159	15.6%
2	Classroom Instruction	8,600	45	8,659	−0.7%
6	Support Services	2,986	77	2,167	37.8%
8	Administrative Cost	1,960	82	1,547	26.7%
10	Operations & Maintenance	2,434	84	1,612	51.0%
13	Extracurricular Activities	130	72	104	25.0%
16	Median Teacher Salary	70,885	77	61,136
Data from NJDoE 2014 Taxpayers' Guide to Education Spending. *Of K-8 districts with more than 750 students. Lowest spending=1; Highest=84

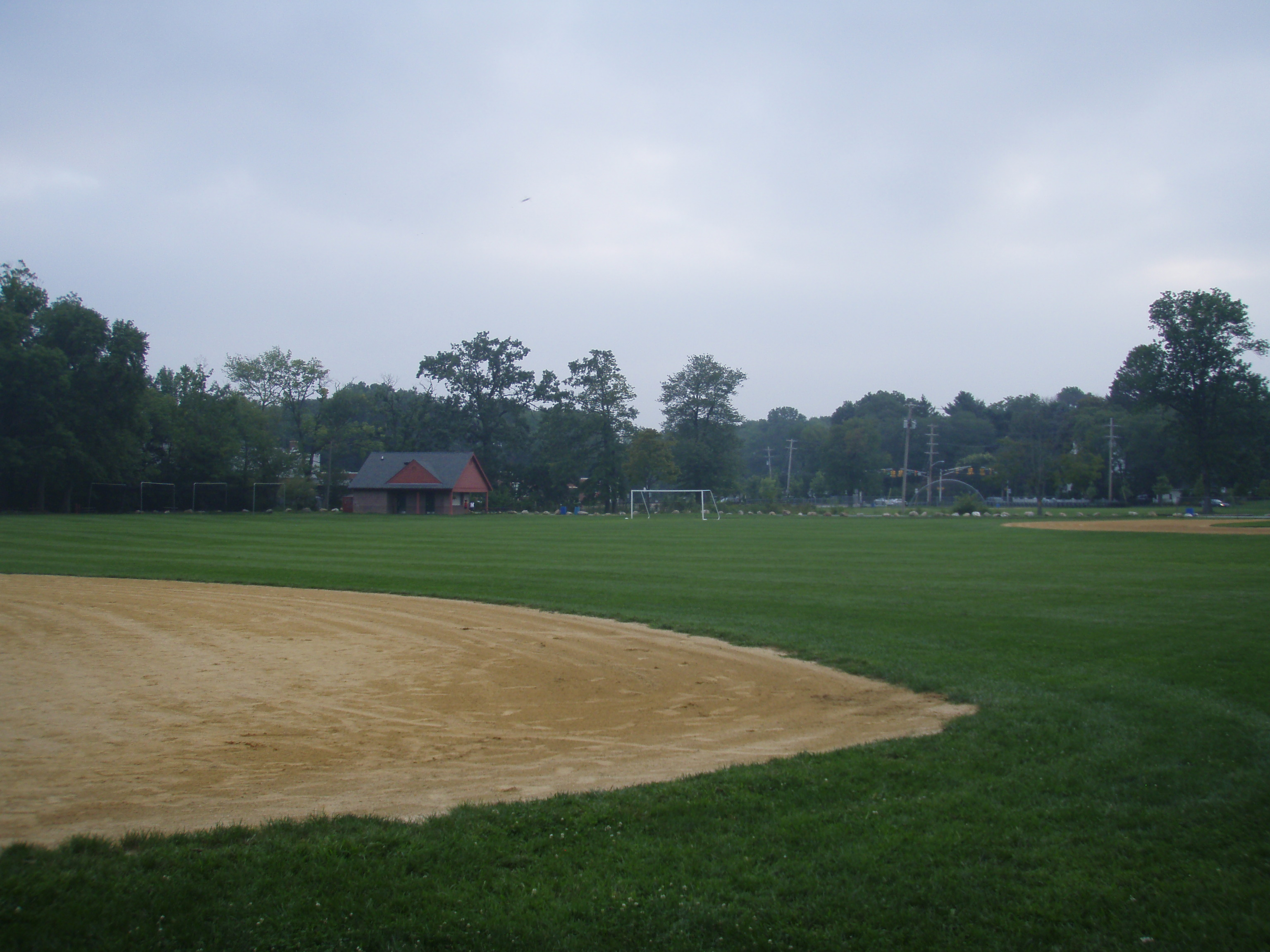
The field at Brookside School, August 2007

The Allendale School District is a community public school district that serves students in pre-kindergarten through eighth grade in the Borough of Allendale, in Bergen County, in the U.S. state of New Jersey.

As of the 2020–21 school year, the district, comprising two schools, had an enrollment of 859 students and 69.0 classroom teachers (on an FTE basis), for a student–teacher ratio of 12.4:1.

The district is classified by the New Jersey Department of Education as being in District Factor Group "I", the second-highest of eight groupings. District Factor Groups organize districts statewide to allow comparison by common socioeconomic characteristics of the local districts. From lowest socioeconomic status to highest, the categories are A, B, CD, DE, FG, GH, I and J.

There are two schools, one primary school for grades PreK-3 and one upper elementary school for grades 4-8, with the middle school program located within the Brookside building. The administration of the schools includes district-wide services through the superintendent of schools and the board secretary and business administrator. Additionally, in each school the administration includes a principal.

For high school, public school students in Allendale for grades nine through twelve attend Northern Highlands Regional High School, which also serves students from Ho-Ho-Kus, Upper Saddle River and some students from Saddle River (who have the option of attending either Northern Highlands or Ramsey High School, as part of sending/receiving relationships with the two districts). As of the 2020–21 school year, the high school had an enrollment of 1,364 students and 106.3 classroom teachers (on an FTE basis), for a student–teacher ratio of 12.8:1. New Jersey Monthly magazine ranked the high school as the 22nd-best of 328 ranked schools in New Jersey in its 2012 rankings of the "Top Public High Schools" after being ranked 6th of 322 schools in 2010.

== History ==
Through the start of the 1957-58 school year, students from Allendale, Mahwah, Saddle River and Upper Saddle River all attended Ramsey High School as part of sending/receiving relationships with the respective districts and the Ramsey Public School District. Allendale, Mahwah and Upper Saddle River left the Ramsey district in September 1958 once Mahwah High School was completed; Allendale and Upper Saddle River joined the Northern Highlands District once the school was opened in 1965.

== Awards and recognition ==
The NAMM Foundation named the district in its 2008 survey of the "Best Communities for Music Education", which included 110 school districts nationwide.

== Schools ==
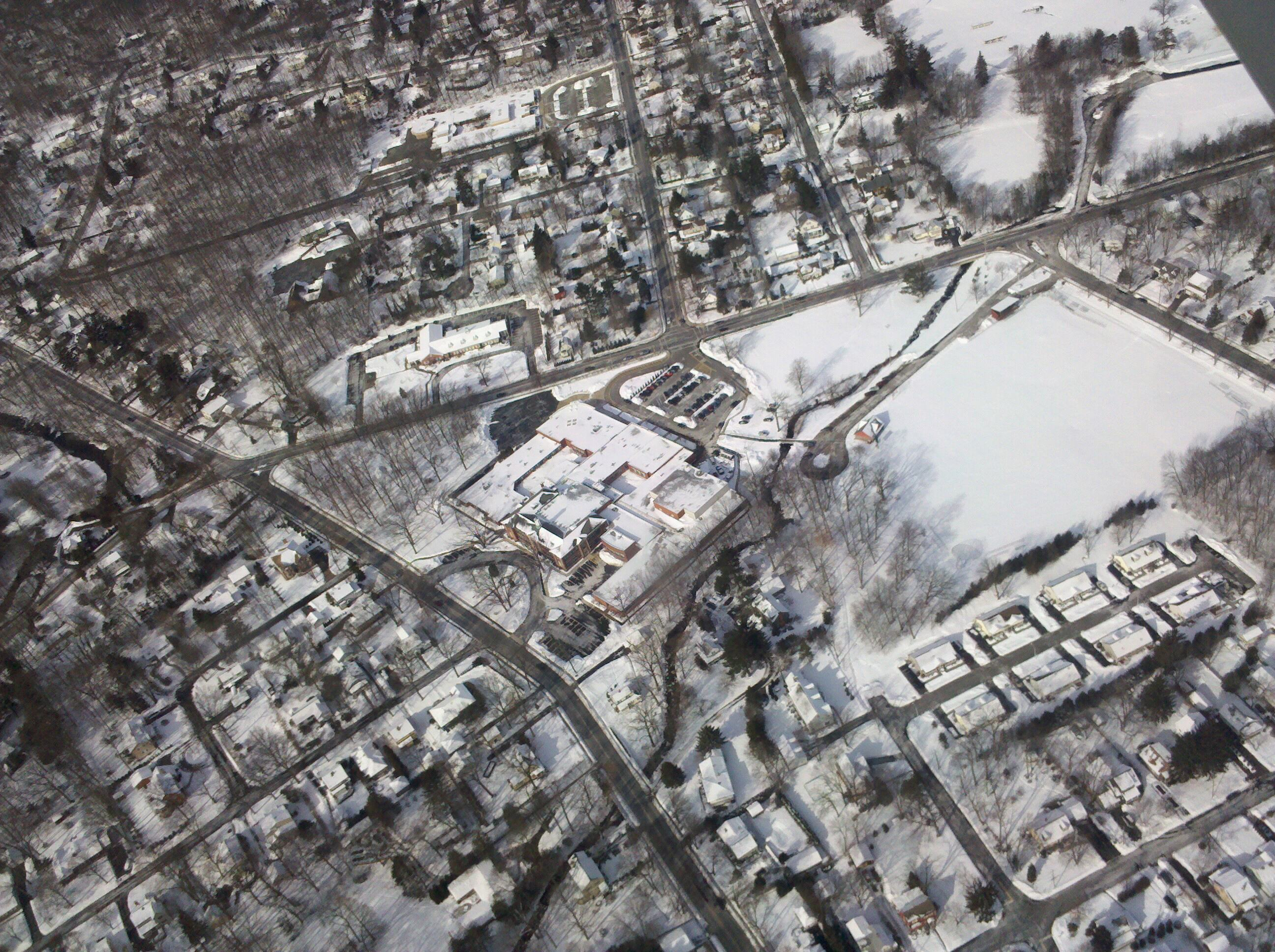
Aerial view of Brookside School, January 2011

Schools in the district (with 2020–21 enrollment data from the National Center for Education Statistics.) are:

- Hillside School with 343 students in pre-kindergarten to 3rd grade
  - Anastasia Maroulis, principal
- Brookside School with 506 students from 4th to 8th grades
  - Bruce Winkelstein, principal

== Administration ==
Core members of the district's administration are:

- Michael J. Barcadepone, superintendent
- Maria L. Engeleit, business administrator and board secretary

== Board of education ==
The district's board of education is comprised of five members who set policy and oversee the fiscal and educational operation of the district through its administration. As a Type II school district, the board's trustees are elected directly by voters to serve three-year terms of office on a staggered basis, with either one or two seats up for election each year held (since 2012) as part of the November general election. The board appoints a superintendent to oversee the district's day-to-day operations and a business administrator to supervise the business functions of the district.

In 2012, school elections were shifted from April to the November general election as part of an effort to reduce the costs of a standalone April vote.
