= Pompton Township, New Jersey =

Coordinates: 40.991°N 74.279°W

Historical population
Census	Pop.	Note	%±
1810	2,060		—
1820	2,818		36.8%
1830	3,085		9.5%
1840	1,437	*	−53.4%
1850	1,720		19.7%
1860	1,591		−7.5%
1870	1,840		15.7%
1880	2,251		22.3%
1890	2,153		−4.4%
1900	2,404	*	11.7%
1910	4,044		68.2%
Population sources: 1790-1920 1840 1850-1870; 1850 1870 1880-1890; 1890-1910 1910 * = Territory change in previous decade.

Pompton Township is a defunct township in Passaic County, New Jersey, United States, that existed from 1797 until it was dissolved in 1918.

== History ==
The township was originally formed on April 10, 1797, from portions of Saddle River Township and Franklin Township in Bergen County, and incorporated on February 21, 1798, as one of the state's initial group of 104 townships.

On March 10, 1834, West Milford was created from portions of the township.

When Passaic County, New Jersey was established on February 7, 1837, it included Pompton Township.

The borough of Pompton Lakes, New Jersey was formed on February 26, 1895, during the peak of the "Boroughitis" phenomenon, as the second municipality to split from the township. The township was divided on February 23, 1918, into three boroughs: Bloomingdale, Ringwood and Wanaque, with the remaining portion passing to Pompton Lakes. This ended the existence of the township.

According to news accounts at the time of the split, local leaders from the various communities felt that the population growth within the township was a hindrance to the ability of the Township Committee to govern. Citizens of Haskell (now part of Wanaque) had begun to discuss the formation of their own borough and this prompted citizens in the other sections to follow their lead. A significant portion of the land was sparsely populated and the split off of one community would leave a larger tax burden on those that remained.

A meeting was called for January 12, 1918, to discuss the pros and cons of splitting the township. From that, a committee representing the various sections was formed and eventually three boroughs were agreed on, the boundaries established and finances settled (share of debt, distribution of assets). In addition, the township school district was similarly divided into the separate districts for each borough. The vote to split was approved in all three sections in February.

The final Township Committee meeting took place on May 14, 1918, in Midvale to finalize the disbursement of cash in the township treasury to the three boroughs and pay off remaining debt owed to the county.

Based on data from the 2010 United States census, the combined population of the five municipalities that were formed from Pompton Township—Bloomingdale (7,656), Pompton Lakes (11,097), Ringwood (12,228), Wanaque (11,116) and West Milford (25,850) -- was 67,947, which would have made Pompton the 16th largest municipality in the state (and fourth largest in Passaic County, not far behind Passaic) if it still existed today.

== Sources ==
- Argus Newspaper, Jan 10, 1918 & May 17, 1918
