= Mahwah, New Jersey =

Township in Bergen County, New Jersey, US

- Township
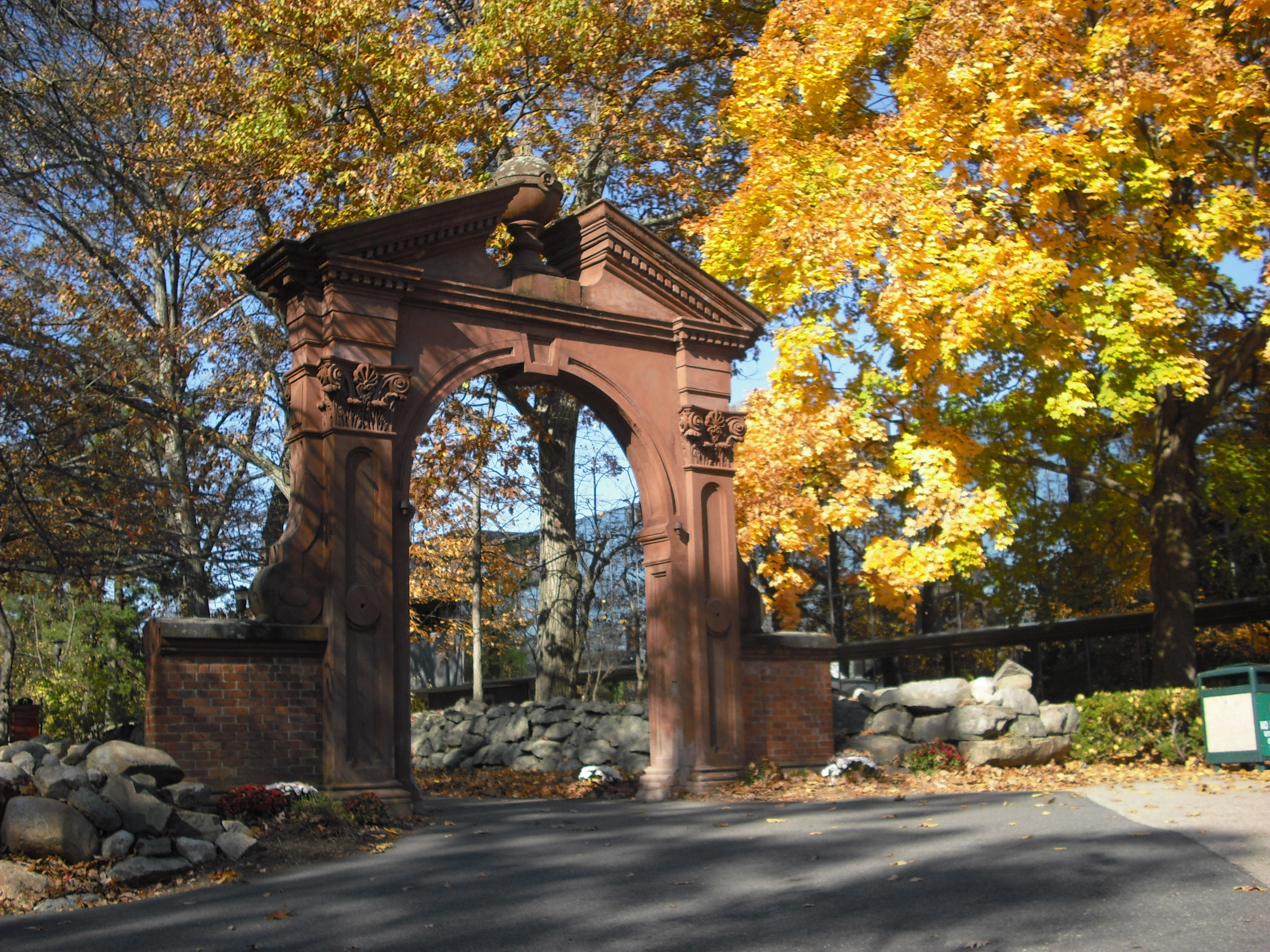
- Ramapo College arch

- Seal

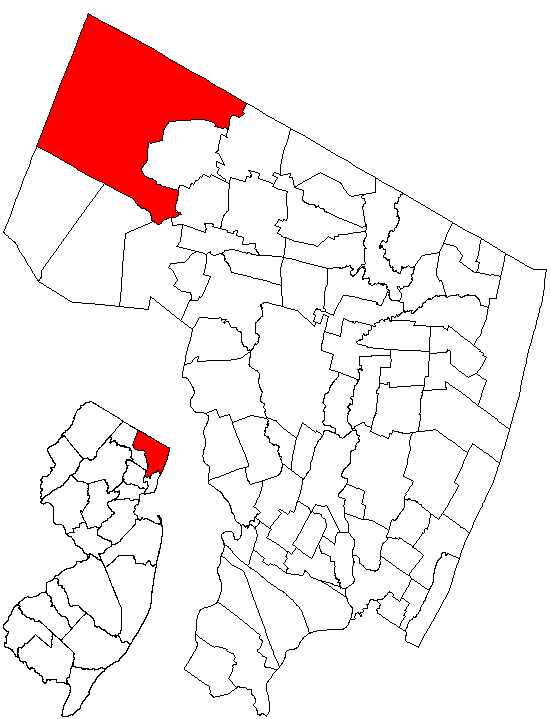
- Location of Mahwah in Bergen County highlighted in red (right). Inset map: Location of Bergen County in New Jersey highlighted in red (left).

- Location in Bergen County Location in New Jersey Location in the United States
- Coordinates: 41.082067°N 74.183061°W
- Country: United States
- State: New Jersey
- County: Bergen
- Incorporated: April 9, 1849 (as Hohokus Township)
- Reincorporated: November 7, 1944 (as Mahwah)

Government
  - Type: Faulkner Act (mayor–council)
  - Body: Township Council
  - Mayor: Jim Wysocki (term ends December 31, 2028)
  - Administrator: Ben Kezmarsky
  - Municipal clerk: Carolyn George

Area
  - Total: 25.88 sq mi (67.04 km^{2})
  - Land: 25.39 sq mi (65.76 km^{2})
  - Water: 0.49 sq mi (1.27 km^{2}) 1.90%
  - Rank: 102nd of 565 in state 1st of 70 in county
- Elevation: 246 ft (75 m)

Population (2020)
  - Total: 25,487
  - Estimate (2023): 25,344
  - Rank: 102nd of 565 in state 12th of 70 in county
  - Density: 1,003.7/sq mi (387.5/km^{2})
  - Rank: 385th of 565 in state 66th of 70 in county
- Time zone: UTC−05:00 (Eastern (EST))
  - Summer (DST): UTC−04:00 (Eastern (EDT))
- ZIP Code: 07430, 07495
- Area code: 201
- FIPS code: 3400342750
- GNIS feature ID: 0882312
- Website: www.mahwahtwp.org

Mahwah is the northernmost and largest municipality by geographic area (26.19 square miles (67.8 km^{2})) in Bergen County, in the U.S. state of New Jersey. As of the 2020 United States census, the township's population was 25,487, a decrease of 403 (−1.6%) from the 2010 census count of 25,890, which in turn reflected an increase of 1,828 (+7.6%) from the 24,062 counted in the 2000 census. The name "Mahwah" is derived from the Lenape language word "mawewi" which means "Meeting Place" or "Place Where Paths Meet".

The area that is now Mahwah was originally formed as Hohokus Township on April 9, 1849, from portions of the former Franklin Township (now Wyckoff). While known as Hohokus Township, territory was taken to form Orvil Township (on January 1, 1886; remainder of township is now Waldwick), Allendale (November 10, 1894), Upper Saddle River (November 22, 1894), and Ramsey (March 10, 1908). On November 7, 1944, the area was incorporated by an act of the New Jersey Legislature as the Township of Mahwah, based on the results of a referendum held that day, replacing Hohokus Township. New Jersey Monthly magazine ranked Mahwah as its ninth best place to live in its 2008 rankings of the "Best Places To Live" in New Jersey.

== History ==
The Lenape and ancestral Indigenous peoples were the original inhabitants of Mahwah (the meeting place) and surrounding area.

In 1849, Hohokus Township was established from the northern part of Franklin Township in Bergen County. It extended from the Saddle River on the east to the western boundary of Bergen County with Passaic County and north to the New York border. Hohokus Township was first subdivided in 1886 with the creation of Orvil Township on both sides of the Saddle River, consisting of the eastern portion of Hohokus Township and the western portion of Washington Township. 1894's outbreak of "Boroughitis" brought the creation of the boroughs of Allendale and Upper Saddle River, both of which were created from portions of Hohokus and Orvil Townships. Next to leave was Ramsey, which was created in 1908.

Hohokus Township ceased to exist on November 7, 1944, when a referendum was passed creating Mahwah Township from the remaining portions of Hohokus Township.

For twenty-five years, beginning in 1976, Mahwah hosted the A&P Tennis Classic, a tune-up for the U.S. Open tennis tournament held at the USTA Billie Jean King National Tennis Center in New York City's Flushing Meadows–Corona Park.

The 75-room, three-story Crocker-McMillin Mansion, also known as Darlington, was built in 1901 for George Crocker, son of railroad magnate Charles Crocker. The estate, located at Crocker Mansion Drive, is one of New Jersey's historical landmarks.

Ford Motor Company operated the Mahwah Assembly plant from 1955, producing 6 million cars in the 25 years it operated before the last car rolled off the line on June 20, 1980. At the time of its completion, it was the largest motor vehicle assembly plant in the United States. The Ford plant, along with other businesses such as American Brake Shoe and Foundry Company, helped contribute to the economic development of the township and its reputation for low home property taxes. The Mahwah town sports teams remain named Thunderbirds in honor of the Ford plant.

Due to contractors' dumping of hazardous wastes at the Ringwood Mines landfill site before federal regulation, it has been designated as an EPA Superfund site which needs extensive environmental cleanup. In 2006, some 600 Ramapough Indians filed a mass tort claim against Ford for damages. Mahwah, and the closure of the Ford plant, is mentioned in the opening line of the 1982 Bruce Springsteen song "Johnny 99".

In July 2017, while holding the position of Bergen County prosecutor prior to becoming New Jersey Attorney General, Gurbir Grewal ordered the Mahwah police department not to enforce a ban on non-New Jersey residents using parks in Mahwah, stating his concern that a ban could lead to anti-Semitic religious profiling against the growing population of Orthodox Jews in Mahwah and those visiting from neighboring Rockland County, New York. On December 14, 2017, following the advice of legal counsel, the Mahwah council repealed the still-unenforced ban on out-of-state park users, and abandoned an attempt to amend the sign ordinance to bar "other matter" (the lechis) from being affixed to utility poles to form an Orthodox Jewish eruv.

== Geography ==
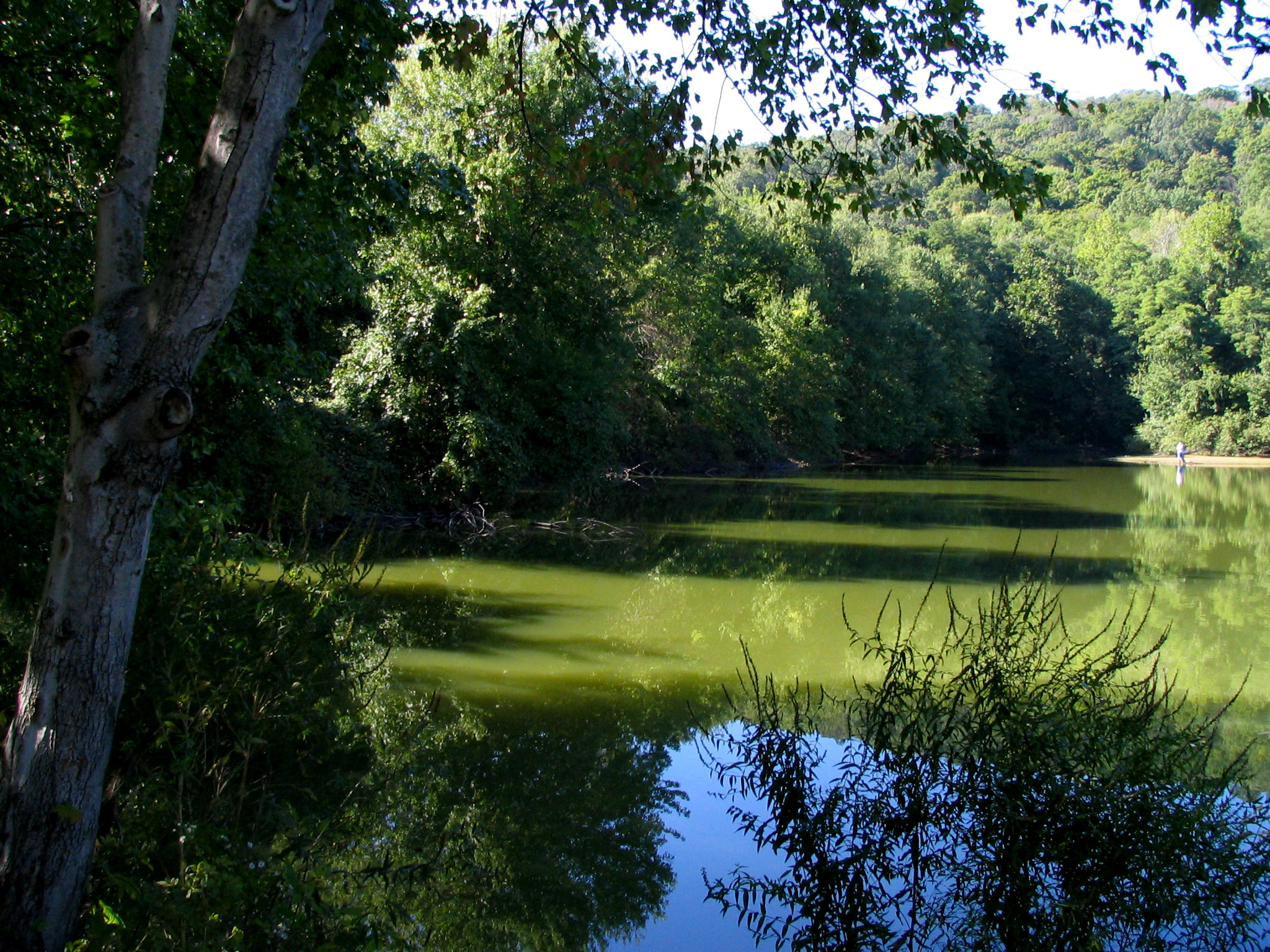
Scarlet Oak Pond, Ramapo Valley County Reservation

According to the United States Census Bureau, the township had a total area of 25.88 square miles (67.04 km^{2}), including 25.39 square miles (65.76 km^{2}) of land and 0.49 square miles (1.27 km^{2}) of water (1.90%). It is the largest municipality in Bergen County by area, more than 2½ times larger than the next-largest municipality, Paramus, and covering 10.6% of the total area of the entire county.

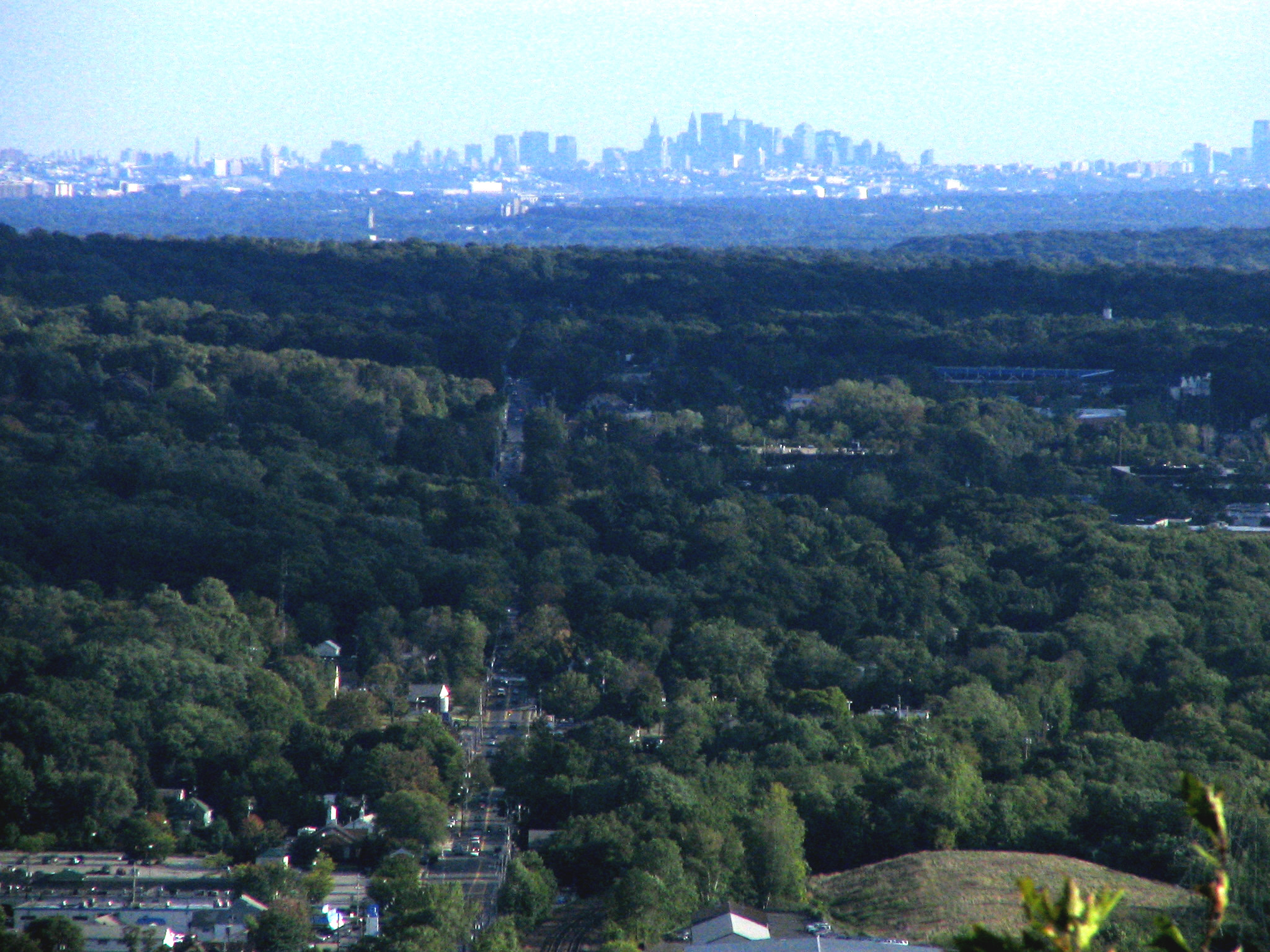
Franklin Turnpike in Mahwah with the Manhattan skyline 30 miles (48 km) distant.

Mahwah is near the Ramapo Mountains and the Ramapo River. Interstate 287 passes through Mahwah, but the only point of access is at the New Jersey–New York border, where 287 meets Route 17. U.S. Route 202 runs through Mahwah from Oakland to Suffern, across the state line.

Several county parks are located in Mahwah, including Campgaw Mountain Reservation, Darlington County Park and Ramapo Valley County Reservation, all operated by Bergen County. The Ramapo River runs through the western section of Mahwah.

Mahwah is bordered by the municipalities of Allendale, Franklin Lakes, Oakland, Ramsey, Upper Saddle River and Wyckoff in Bergen County; Ringwood in Passaic County; and Airmont, Hillburn, Ramapo and Suffern in Rockland County, New York.

Unincorporated communities, localities, and place names located partially or completely within the township include the residential areas of Ackermans Mills, Bear Swamp, Bogerts Ranch Estates, Cragmere, Cragmere Park, Darlington, Fardale, Halifax, Havemeyers Reservoir, Masonicus, Mountainside Farm, Pulis Mills, Ramapo Farm and Wanamakers Mills, along with the mixed residential and commercial area of West Mahwah.

=== Climate ===
Mahwah has a humid continental climate (Köppen climate classification Dfa).

Climate data for Mahwah
Month	Jan	Feb	Mar	Apr	May	Jun	Jul	Aug	Sep	Oct	Nov	Dec	Year
Mean daily maximum °F (°C)	36 (2)	39 (4)	49 (9)	60 (16)	71 (22)	79 (26)	84 (29)	82 (28)	75 (24)	64 (18)	53 (12)	41 (5)	61 (16)
Mean daily minimum °F (°C)	18 (−8)	20 (−7)	29 (−2)	39 (4)	48 (9)	57 (14)	62 (17)	61 (16)	53 (12)	41 (5)	33 (1)	24 (−4)	40 (5)
Average precipitation inches (mm)	3.11 (79)	2.99 (76)	3.85 (98)	4.21 (107)	4.09 (104)	4.64 (118)	4.42 (112)	4.41 (112)	4.42 (112)	4.49 (114)	4.06 (103)	3.92 (100)	48.61 (1,235)

== Economy ==
Corporate residents of Mahwah include:

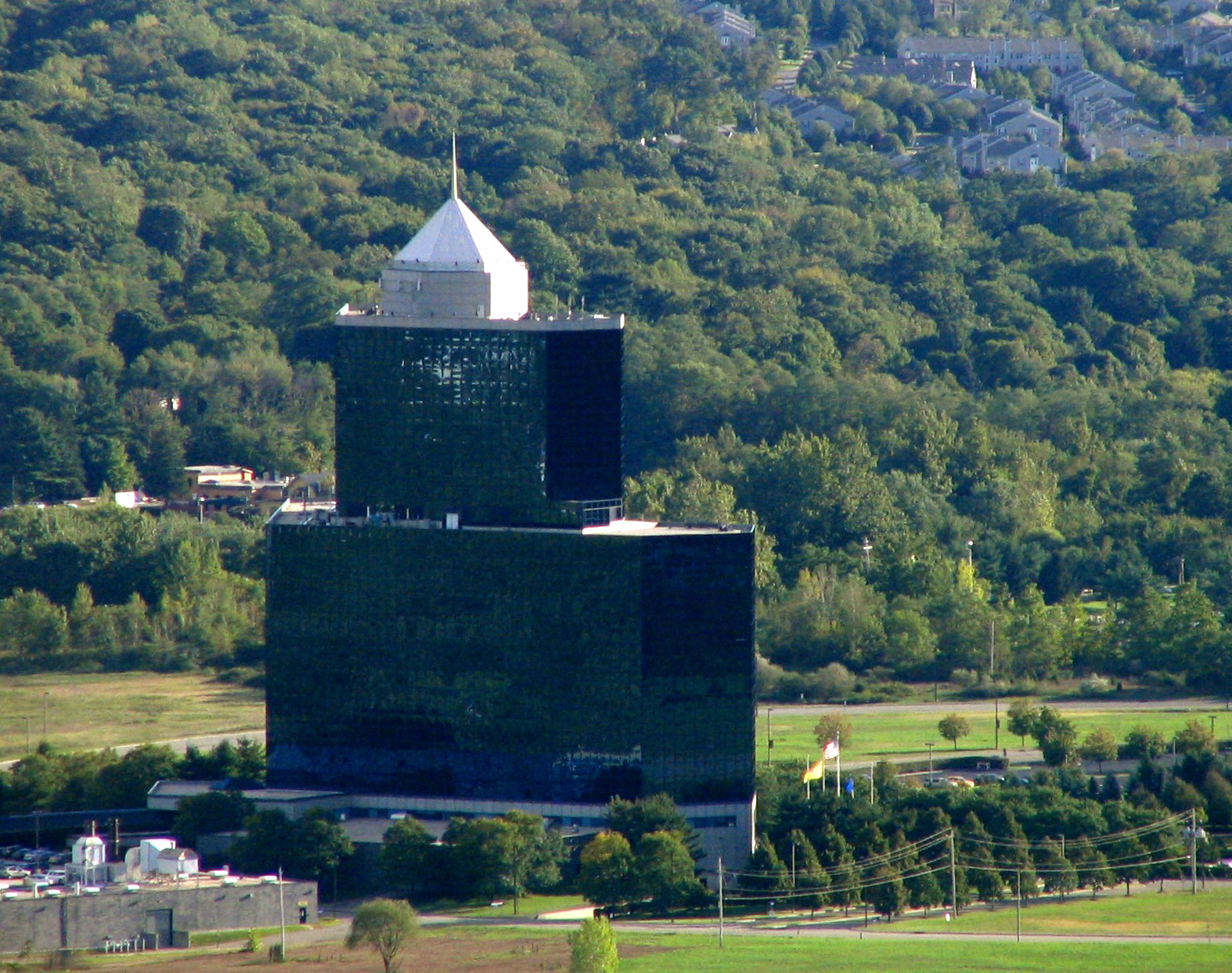
Sheraton Crossroads (closed in late 2023 and was demolished by implosion on May 10, 2025)

- Nuance Communications, voice, natural language understanding, reasoning and systems integration
- DialAmerica Marketing corporate headquarters.
- Inserra Supermarkets, a member of the ShopRite retail cooperative, operating approximately 22 stores. It is a family-owned business and is one of the 500 largest private companies in the United States.
- Jaguar Cars and Land Rover vehicles North American Headquarters.
- Lawrence Erlbaum Associates, book publisher.
- Maquet Datascope Corporation – manufacturer of intra-aortic balloon pumps and sterile collagen products.
- Mindray Medical North America headquarters – manufacturer of patient monitoring devices.
- New York – New Jersey Trail Conference headquarters, Darlington Schoolhouse
- New York Stock Exchange Data Center – one of the world's most robust and secure data centers.
- Radware Inc. North American headquarters.
- Radwin North American headquarters.
- Stryker Corporation's orthopedic business.
- UPS world technology headquarters.
- Volvo Cars North America headquarters.
- Mahwah Mall, which is to be built at the site of the Sheraton Crossroads Hotel. Many Mahwah citizens were against the mall being built out of concern that the mall would cause increased congestion, crime, and pollution, but the planning board approved the plan in January 2014 for a mall that would include 600,000 square feet (56,000 m^{2}) of selling space.

== Parks and recreation ==
Campgaw Mountain Reservation is a Bergen County accredited park, covering 1,351 acres (547 ha) in Mahwah and portions of Oakland, that has campgrounds and ski slopes for skiing.

== Demographics ==
Historical population
Census	Pop.	Note	%±
1850	2,274	*	—
1860	2,352		3.4%
1870	2,632		11.9%
1880	2,920		10.9%
1890	2,373	*	−18.7%
1900	2,610	*	10.0%
1910	1,881	*	−27.9%
1920	2,081		10.6%
1930	3,536		69.9%
1940	3,908		10.5%
1950	4,880		24.9%
1960	7,376		51.1%
1970	10,800		46.4%
1980	12,127		12.3%
1990	17,905		47.6%
2000	24,062		34.4%
2010	25,890		7.6%
2020	25,487		−1.6%
2023 (est.)	25,344		−0.6%
Population sources: 1850–1920; 1850–1870 1850 1870; 1880–1890 1890–1910; 1910–1930 1900–2020; 2000 2010 2020 * = Lost territory in previous decade.

=== 2020 census ===
Mahwah township, Bergen County, New Jersey – Racial and ethnic composition Note: the US Census treats Hispanic/Latino as an ethnic category. This table excludes Latinos from the racial categories and assigns them to a separate category. Hispanics/Latinos may be of any race.
Race / Ethnicity (NH = Non-Hispanic)	Pop 2000	Pop 2010	Pop 2020	% 2000	% 2010	% 2020
White alone (NH)	20,555	21,088	18,840	85.43%	81.45%	73.92%
Black or African American alone (NH)	510	616	686	2.12%	2.38%	2.69%
Native American or Alaska Native alone (NH)	152	121	93	0.63%	0.47%	0.36%
Asian alone (NH)	1,510	2,014	2,830	6.28%	7.78%	11.10%
Native Hawaiian or Pacific Islander alone (NH)	7	0	2	0.03%	0.00%	0.01%
Other race alone (NH)	29	20	103	0.12%	0.08%	0.40%
Mixed race or Multiracial (NH)	271	409	729	1.13%	1.58%	2.86%
Hispanic or Latino (any race)	1,028	1,622	2,204	4.27%	6.26%	8.65%
Total	24,062	25,890	25,487	100.00%	100.00%	100.00%

=== 2010 census ===
The 2010 United States census counted 25,890 people, 9,505 households, and 6,245 families in the township. The population density was 1,007.7 per square mile (389.1/km^{2}). There were 9,868 housing units at an average density of 384.1 per square mile (148.3/km^{2}). The racial makeup was 85.67% (22,180) White, 2.62% (678) Black or African American, 0.56% (146) Native American, 7.81% (2,021) Asian, 0.01% (2) Pacific Islander, 1.40% (363) from other races, and 1.93% (500) from two or more races. Hispanic or Latino of any race were 6.26% (1,622) of the population.

Of the 9,505 households, 28.9% had children under the age of 18; 54.1% were married couples living together; 8.8% had a female householder with no husband present and 34.3% were non-families. Of all households, 30.1% were made up of individuals and 11.1% had someone living alone who was 65 years of age or older. The average household size was 2.42 and the average family size was 3.05.

19.8% of the population were under the age of 18, 16.2% from 18 to 24, 20.3% from 25 to 44, 29.4% from 45 to 64, and 14.2% who were 65 years of age or older. The median age was 40.4 years. For every 100 females, the population had 87.1 males. For every 100 females ages 18 and older there were 82.6 males.

The Census Bureau's 2006–2010 American Community Survey showed that (in 2010 inflation-adjusted dollars) median household income was $92,971 (with a margin of error of +/− $5,209) and the median family income was $107,977 (+/− $7,049). Males had a median income of $85,873 (+/− $6,728) versus $54,111 (+/− $3,935) for females. The per capita income for the borough was $53,375 (+/− $3,851). About 2.2% of families and 3.1% of the population were below the poverty line, including 1.7% of those under age 18 and 4.3% of those age 65 or over.

Same-sex couples headed 49 households in 2010, an increase from the 27 counted in 2000.

=== 2000 census ===
As of the 2000 United States census there were 24,062 people, 9,340 households, and 6,285 families residing in the township. The population density was 927.9 inhabitants per square mile (358.3/km^{2}). There were 9,577 housing units at an average density of 369.3 per square mile (142.6/km^{2}). The racial makeup of the township was 87.93% White, 2.16% African American, 0.70% Native American, 6.31% Asian, 0.03% Pacific Islander, 1.50% from other races, and 1.38% from two or more races. Hispanic or Latino of any race were 4.27% of the population.

There were 9,340 households, out of which 30.4% had children under the age of 18 living with them, 56.8% were married couples living together, 8.4% had a female householder with no husband present, and 32.7% were non-families. 28.0% of all households were made up of individuals, and 7.3% had someone living alone who was 65 years of age or older. The average household size was 2.43 and the average family size was 3.01.

In the township the population was spread out, with 22.2% under the age of 18, 9.7% from 18 to 24, 32.2% from 25 to 44, 25.2% from 45 to 64, and 10.7% who were 65 years of age or older. The median age was 37 years. For every 100 females, there were 90.6 males. For every 100 females age 18 and over, there were 86.4 males.

The median income for a household in the township was $79,500, and the median income for a family was $94,484. Males had a median income of $62,326 versus $42,527 for females. The per capita income for the township was $44,709. About 1.2% of families and 2.0% of the population were below the poverty line, including 1.8% of those under age 18 and 4.2% of those age 65 or over.

== Government ==
=== Local government ===
Mahwah is governed within the Faulkner Act (formally known as the Optional Municipal Charter Law) under the Mayor-Council system of municipal government (Plan B), implemented by direct petition as of July 1, 1984. The township is one of 71 municipalities (of the 564) statewide that use this form of government. The governing body is comprised of the Mayor and the seven-member Township Council, with all members elected at-large to staggered four-year terms of office on a non-partisan basis as part of the November general election in even-numbered years. Four council seats are up for vote together and then three seats and the mayoral seat are up for vote together two years later. The legislative powers of the township are exercised by the Township Council. In September 2010, the township council voted to shift the township's non-partisan elections from May to November, citing increased voter participation and prospective savings of $30,000 associated with supporting each election, with the first November election taking place in 2012.

As of 2023, the Mayor of Mahwah is Jim Wysocki, who was elected to succeed John Roth, and whose term of office ends December 31, 2028. Roth had been elected in November 2018 following the recall of the former mayor, William Laforet. Members of the Township Council are Council President Rob Ferguson (2026), Council Vice President Michelle Paz (2028), Janet Ariemma (2026), George Ervin (2028), Ward Donigian (2026), Dave May (2028) and Jonathan Wong (2026).

Then-Mayor Bill Laforet faced a recall election in November 2018, after a resident group submitted in June a list of 5,000 petition signatures that they had collected calling for the action, in excess of the 25% needed to place the measure in front of voters. In the November 2018 general election, Laforet was recalled from office and John Roth was elected mayor. The successful recall was the first in the county for at least 25 years.

Michelle Paz, a Republican, was appointed to fill the seat expiring in December 2020 that was vacated following the resignation of Steven Sbarra that became effective at the end of December 2017, and was elected in her own right in November 2018 to fill the unexpired term.

At the January 2017 reorganization meeting, David May was sworn in to fill the seat expiring in December 2020 that had been won by Jonathan Marcus in the November 2016 general election, but which Marcus decided not to accept; May was elected in his own right in the November 2017 general election, to serve the balance of the term.

In December 2016, the Township Council selected George Ervin to fill the seat that had been held by Mary Amoroso expiring in December 2018 that became vacant after she was elected the Bergen County Board of Chosen Freeholders; Ervin served on an interim basis until the November 2017 general election, when voters elected him in his own right to fill the balance of the term. Ervin was re-elected in the November 2018 election to fill a full four-year term, expiring in 2022.

In August 1997, due to personal debt, then-Mayor David J. Dwork shot and killed himself in the town's mayoral offices. There were also unverified allegations of corruption. Dwork was memorialized with a tree dedicated to him at the site of the Mahwah Public Library. Dwork was succeeded by Richard J. Martel, then a township council member, who served for 14 years until his own death, of natural causes, on March 7, 2011. Martel himself was succeeded by Council President John DaPuzzo as acting mayor.

=== Federal, state and county representation ===
Mahwah is located in the 5th Congressional District and is part of New Jersey's 39th state legislative district.

For the 119th United States Congress, New Jersey's 5th congressional district is represented by Josh Gottheimer (D, Wyckoff). New Jersey is represented in the United States Senate by Democrats Cory Booker (Newark, term ends 2027) and Andy Kim (Moorestown, term ends 2031).

For the 2026–2027 session, the 39th legislative district of the New Jersey Legislature is represented in the State Senate by Holly Schepisi (R, River Vale) and in the General Assembly by Robert Auth (R, Old Tappan) and John V. Azzariti (R, Saddle River).

Bergen County is governed by a directly elected County Executive, with legislative functions performed by a Board of County Commissioners comprised of seven members who are elected at-large to three-year terms in partisan elections on a staggered basis, with either two or three seats coming up for election each November; a Chairman and Vice Chairman are selected from among its seven members at a reorganization meeting held every January. As of 2025, the county executive is James J. Tedesco III (D, Paramus), whose four-year term of office ends December 31, 2026.

Bergen County's Commissioners are Chair Mary J. Amoroso (D, Mahwah, 2025), Vice Chair Steven A. Tanelli (D, North Arlington, 2027), Chair Pro Tem Joan Voss (D, Fort Lee, 2026), Rafael Marte (D, Bergenfield, 2026), Germaine M. Ortiz (D, Emerson, 2025), Thomas J. Sullivan Jr. (D, Montvale, 2025) and Tracy Silna Zur (D, Franklin Lakes, 2027).

Bergen County's elected constitutional officials are Clerk John S. Hogan (D, Northvale, 2026), Sheriff Anthony Cureton (D, Englewood, 2027) and Surrogate Michael R. Dressler (D, Cresskill, 2026).

=== Politics ===
As of March 2011, there were a total of 15,168 registered voters in Mahwah Township, of which 3,410 (22.5% vs. 31.7% countywide) were registered as Democrats, 4,349 (28.7% vs. 21.1%) were registered as Republicans and 7,399 (48.8% vs. 47.1%) were registered as Unaffiliated. There were 10 voters registered as Libertarians or Greens. Among the township's 2010 Census population, 58.6% (vs. 57.1% in Bergen County) were registered to vote, including 73.1% of those ages 18 and over (vs. 73.7% countywide).

Gubernatorial election results for Mahwah
Year	Republican		Democratic		Third party(ies)	
Year	No.	%	No.	%	No.	%
2025	5,651	51.67%	5,258	48.08%	28	0.26%
2021	5,025	53.28%	4,149	43.99%	257	2.73%
2017	4,377	58.65%	2,946	39.47%	140	1.88%
2013	5,115	70.42%	2,070	28.50%	79	1.09%
2009	4,602	57.65%	2,942	36.86%	438	5.49%
2005	3,933	54.64%	3,134	43.54%	131	1.82%

In the 2016 presidential election, Republican Donald Trump received 6,811 votes (52.6% vs. 41.1% countywide), ahead of Democrat Hillary Clinton with 5,623 votes (43.4% vs. 54.2%) and other candidates with 525 votes (4.1% vs. 4.6%), among the 13,108 ballots cast by the township's 17,408 registered voters, for a turnout of 75.3% (vs. 72.5% in Bergen County). In the 2012 presidential election, Republican Mitt Romney received 6,862 votes (56.2% vs. 43.5% countywide), ahead of Democrat Barack Obama with 5,143 votes (42.1% vs. 54.8%) and other candidates with 99 votes (0.8% vs. 0.9%), among the 12,203 ballots cast by the township's 16,357 registered voters, for a turnout of 74.6% (vs. 70.4% in Bergen County). In the 2008 presidential election, Republican John McCain received 6,768 votes (54.3% vs. 44.5% countywide), ahead of Democrat Barack Obama with 5,501 votes (44.2% vs. 53.9%) and other candidates with 100 votes (0.8% vs. 0.8%), among the 12,457 ballots cast by the township's 15,705 registered voters, for a turnout of 79.3% (vs. 76.8% in Bergen County). In the 2004 presidential election, Republican George W. Bush received 6,829 votes (58.1% vs. 47.2% countywide), ahead of Democrat John Kerry with 4,829 votes (41.1% vs. 51.7%) and other candidates with 67 votes (0.6% vs. 0.7%), among the 11,758 ballots cast by the township's 14,759 registered voters, for a turnout of 79.7% (vs. 76.9% in the whole county).

Presidential elections results
Year	Republican	Democratic
2024	52.0% 7,119	45.4% 6,221
2020	49.0% 7,370	49.4% 7,423
2016	52.6% 6,811	43.4% 5,623
2012	56.2% 6,862	42.1% 5,143
2008	54.3% 6,768	44.2% 5,501
2004	58.1% 6,829	41.1% 4,829

In the 2013 gubernatorial election, Republican Chris Christie received 70.4% of the vote (5,115 cast), ahead of Democrat Barbara Buono with 28.5% (2,070 votes), and other candidates with 1.1% (79 votes), among the 7,391 ballots cast by the township's 15,601 registered voters (127 ballots were spoiled), for a turnout of 47.4%. In the 2009 gubernatorial election, Republican Chris Christie received 4,602 votes (57.4% vs. 45.8% countywide), ahead of Democrat Jon Corzine with 2,942 votes (36.7% vs. 48.0%), Independent Chris Daggett with 404 votes (5.0% vs. 4.7%) and other candidates with 34 votes (0.4% vs. 0.5%), among the 8,018 ballots cast by the township's 15,479 registered voters, yielding a 51.8% turnout (vs. 50.0% in the county).

United States Senate election results for Mahwah1
Year	Republican		Democratic		Third party(ies)	
Year	No.	%	No.	%	No.	%
2024	6,725	51.92%	5,986	46.21%	242	1.87%
2018	5,397	56.04%	3,950	41.02%	283	2.94%
2012	5,855	54.45%	4,727	43.96%	170	1.58%
2006	4,257	56.67%	3,165	42.13%	90	1.20%

United States Senate election results for Downe Township2
Year	Republican		Democratic		Third party(ies)	
Year	No.	%	No.	%	No.	%
2020	7,299	49.86%	7,121	48.65%	218	1.49%
2014	3,614	53.30%	3,058	45.10%	109	1.61%
2013	2,555	53.93%	2,155	45.48%	28	0.59%
2008	6,207	55.33%	4,849	43.22%	163	1.45%

=== Highlands protection ===
In 2004, the New Jersey Legislature passed the Highlands Water Protection and Planning Act, which regulates the New Jersey Highlands region. Mahwah was included in the highlands preservation area and is subject to the rules of the act and the Highlands Water Protection and Planning Council, a division of the New Jersey Department of Environmental Protection. Some of the territory in the protected region is classified as being in the highlands preservation area, and thus subject to additional rules.

== Education ==
=== Public schools ===
The Mahwah Township Public Schools provides public education for students in pre-kindergarten through twelfth grade. As of the 2019–20 school year, the district, comprised of six schools, had an enrollment of 2,913 students and 262.6 classroom teachers (on an FTE basis), for a student–teacher ratio of 11.1:1. Schools in the district, with 2019–20 enrollment data from the National Center for Education Statistics, are Lenape Meadows Elementary School with 328 students in grades Pre-K–3, Betsy Ross Elementary School with 241 students in grades K–3, George Washington Elementary School with 189 students in grades K–3, Joyce Kilmer Elementary School with 414 students in grades 4–5, Ramapo Ridge Middle School with 685 students in grades 6–8 and Mahwah High School with 900 students in grades 9–12.

The district's newest building, Lenape Meadows, was opened in 2002 and changed the way the district divided up grade levels. Since the K–3 grades are broken up by location in the township which determines the elementary school to attend, before Lenape Meadows was built, students of that section of town attended Commodore Perry School. Commodore Perry School, Betsy Ross, and George Washington originally only housed the K–2 grades and the entire 3rd grade class attended Joyce Kilmer. The construction of Lenape Meadows added enough room for 3rd grade students as well, allowing Betsy Ross and George Washington room to house their students for 3rd grade, too.

Public school students from the township, and all of Bergen County, are eligible to attend the secondary education programs offered by the Bergen County Technical Schools, which include the Bergen County Academies in Hackensack, and the Bergen Tech campus in Teterboro or Paramus. The district offers programs on a shared-time or full-time basis, with admission based on a selective application process and tuition covered by the student's home school district.

=== Private school ===
Young World Day School serves students in pre-kindergarten through fifth grade using Montessori and traditional educational methods.

=== Higher education ===
- Ramapo College is a public liberal arts college founded in 1969 with more than 6,000 students.

=== Vocational schools ===
- Lincoln Technical Institute

== Transportation ==
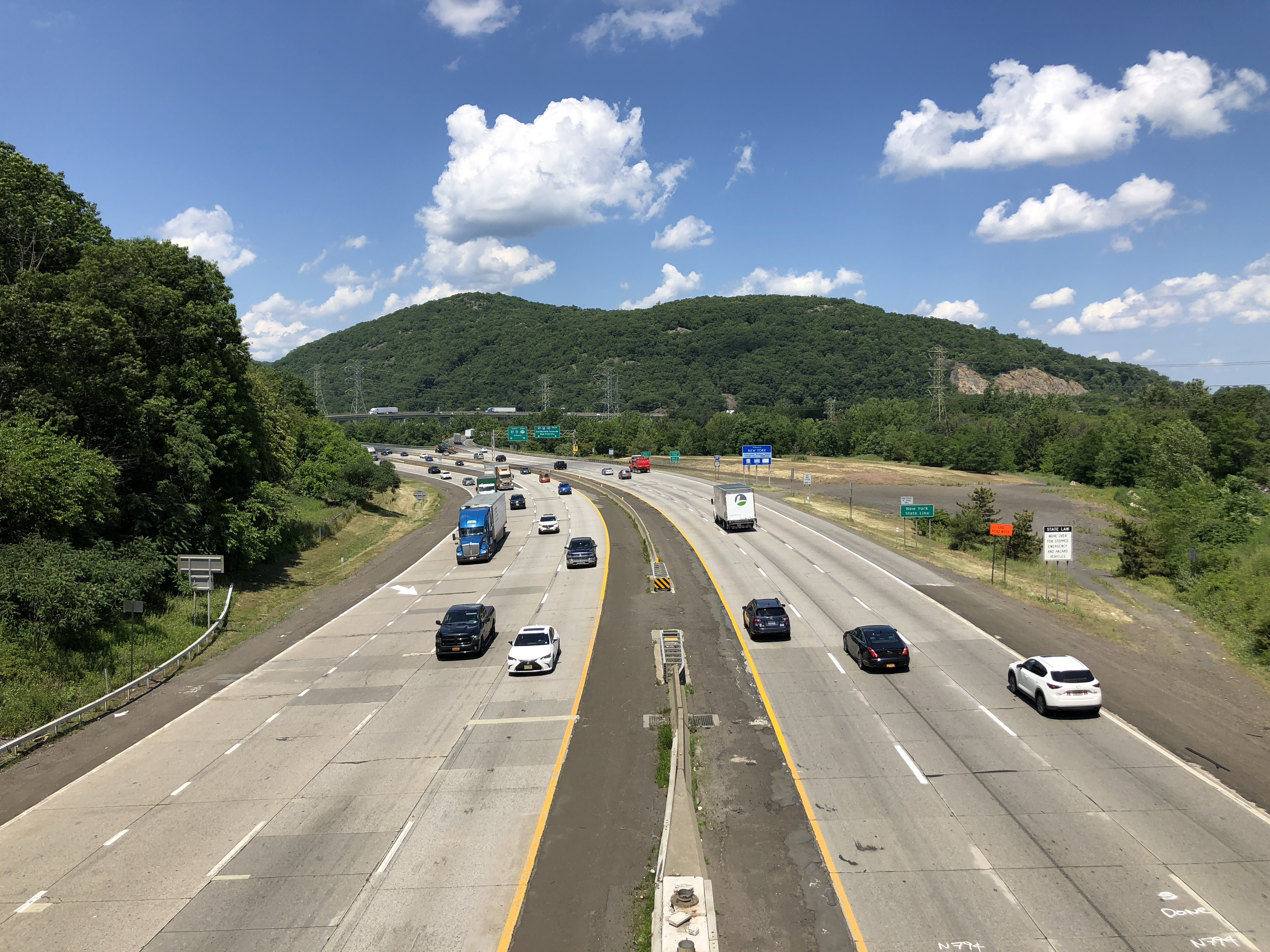
View north along Interstate 287 and Route 17 in Mahwah, just south of the New York state line

=== Roads and highways ===
As of May 2010, the township had a total of 110.29 miles (177.49 km) of roadways, of which 81.91 miles (131.82 km) were maintained by the municipality, 20.59 miles (33.14 km) by Bergen County and 7.79 miles (12.54 km) by the New Jersey Department of Transportation.

Interstate 287 and Route 17 merge in Mahwah, and U.S. Route 202 also passes through. The northern terminus of County Route 507 is also in Mahwah. Interstate 87 (the New York State Thruway) is just outside the state in Suffern, New York.

Interstate 287 heads north from Franklin Lakes, continuing for 5.3 miles (8.5 km) to the New York State border. U.S. Route 202 heads north for 5.7 miles (9.2 km), running from Oakland to the New York State border.

Route 17 extends 2.5 miles (4.0 km) from Ramsey until it forms a concurrency where it merges with Interstate 287. County Route 507 runs 2.0 miles (3.2 km) across the northeastern portion of the township, from Ramsey to an intersection with U.S. Route 202 near the state line.

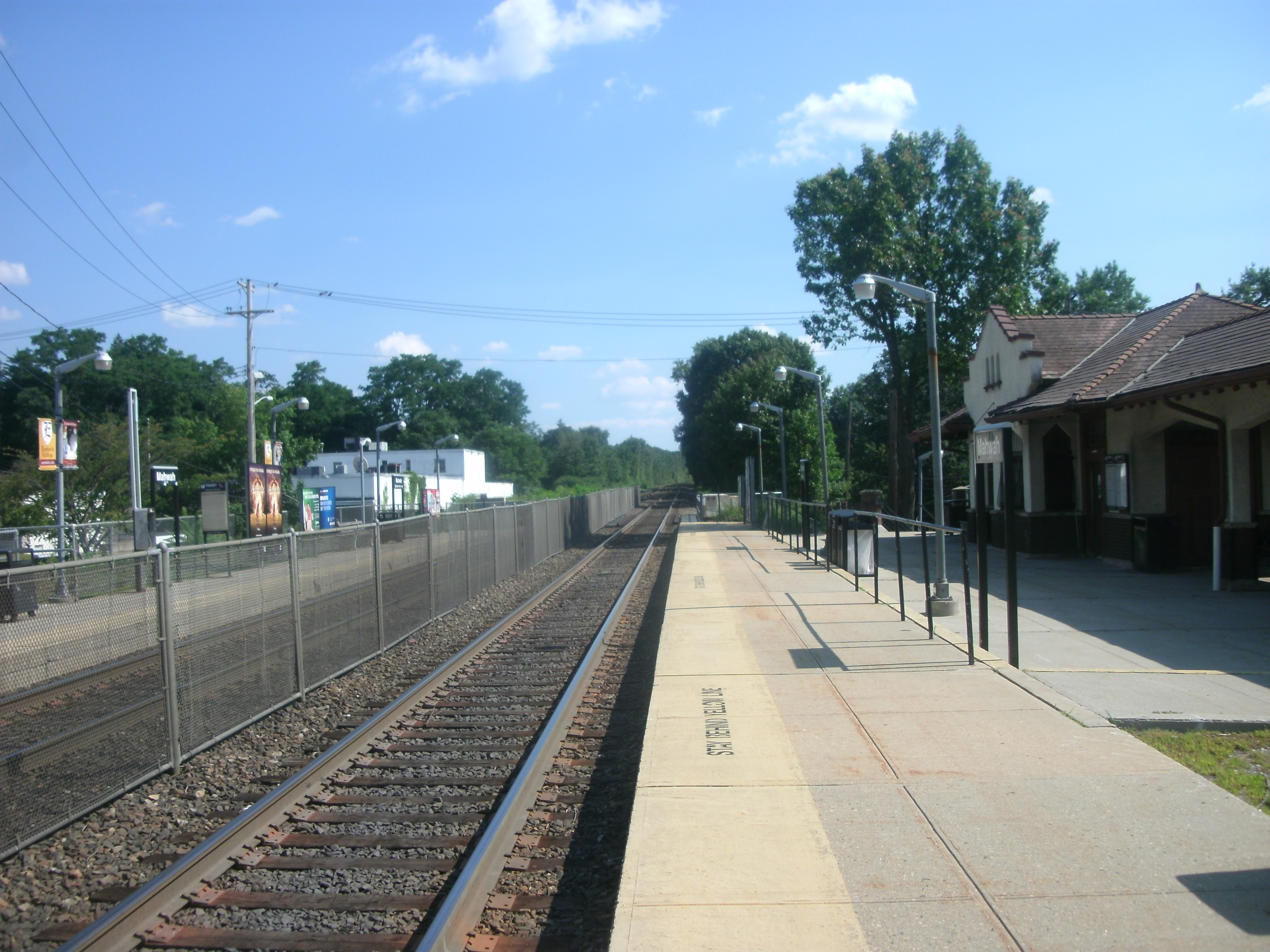
The 1913 Mahwah NJ Transit Station building is visible on the right.

=== Public transportation ===
NJ Transit rail service is available from the Mahwah station. Service is available to Secaucus Junction, Hoboken Terminal and Newark Penn Station on the Main Line and Bergen County Line. Passengers may also take advantage of express service on the same line from the Ramsey Route 17 station located on Route 17 south and the Suffern station, just across the New York state line.

Short Line Bus offers service to the Port Authority Bus Terminal in Midtown Manhattan and intermediate locations.

== State-recognized tribe ==
The State of Jersey named the Ramapough Mountain Indians, based in Mahwah, as a state-recognized tribe in 1980. They are not federally recognized.

== Notable people ==
People who were born in, residents of, or otherwise closely associated with Mahwah include:

- Roger Nash Baldwin (1884–1981), one of the founders of the American Civil Liberties Union (ACLU)
- Gilbert Wheeler Beebe (1912–2003), epidemiologist and statistician known for his studies of radiation-related mortality and morbidity among populations exposed to ionizing radiation from the atomic bombings of Hiroshima and Nagasaki and the Chernobyl reactor accident
- Jill Biden (born 1951), educator who was First Lady of the United States
- Stephen Birch (1872–1940), a leader of Kennecott Copper whose 730-acre (3.0 km^{2}) farm was sold to the state and became the site of Ramapo College
- Curt Blefary (1943–2001), American League Rookie of the Year, 1965
- Lawrence Boadt (1942–2010), Roman Catholic priest and publisher
- Foxy Brown (born 1978), rapper
- Chris Caffery (born 1967), musician and songwriter
- Don Cornell (1919-2004), pop singer
- Frank Chamberlin (1978–2013), NFL linebacker
- Alan Geisler (1931–2009), food chemist best known for creating a popular hot dog sauce
- Joe Graf Jr. (born 1998), race car driver in NASCAR and the ARCA Menards Series
- Jared Greenberg, basketball sideline reporter for the NBA on TNT
- Alice Guy-Blaché (1873–1968), filmmaker who has been considered the first woman director in the motion-picture industry.
- Kevin Haslam (born 1986), former NFL offensive tackle who played for the Oakland Raiders
- Henry Osborne Havemeyer (1847–1907), art collector and entrepreneur who founded the American Sugar Refining Company
- James Hoch, poet
- Vlad Holiday (born 1989), singer, songwriter, producer and multi-instrumentalist who is the lead singer and founder of the New York City-based indie band Born Cages
- John Hollinger (born 1971), basketball analyst and writer for ESPN.com
- Morgan Jay (born 1987), stand-up comedian, musician, actor and YouTuber
- Joyce Kilmer (1886–1918), poet who lived with his family in Mahwah until his service and death in World War I
- Bob Kratch (born 1966) former guard on the Super Bowl XXV Champion New York Giants
- Ernst Lieb (born 1955), President and CEO of Mercedes-Benz USA
- Carl "Spider" Lockhart (1943–1986), safety who played his entire career with the New York Giants
- Leonard Marshall (born 1961), former defensive end for the New York Giants
- Bill McCutcheon (1924–2002), Emmy and Tony Award-winning character actor
- Krysten Moore (born 1989), anti-bullying advocate who won the 2007 Miss Teen New Jersey International pageant and the 2008 National American Miss New Jersey Teen pageant
- Patrick Murray (born 1991), placekicker for the Tampa Bay Buccaneers of the National Football League
- Ariel Nicholson (born 2001/2002), fashion model and LGBT rights activist
- Les Paul (1915–2009), guitarist and inventor
- Maria Pitillo (born 1966), actress who appeared in the 1998 film Godzilla
- Randy Reutershan (born 1955), football player who played for a single NFL season with the Pittsburgh Steelers
- Al Sima (1921–1993), pitcher for the Washington Senators and other teams
- Edgar Smith (1934–2017), convicted murderer, who was once on death row for the 1957 murder of fifteen-year-old honor student and cheerleader Victoria Ann Zielinski
- Kyle Teel (born 2002), professional baseball catcher in the Chicago White Sox organization
- Evelyn Terhune (1932–1981), fencer and fencing coach who competed in the women's individual and team foil events at the 1960 Summer Olympics
- Charley Williams (born 1928), former professional boxer
- Maia Wojciechowska (1927–2000), children's author and winner of the Newbery Medal for her novel Shadow of a Bull
- Chris Wragge (born 1970), anchor, CBS News New York
- Walt Zembriski (born 1935), golfer who played on the PGA Tour and the Senior PGA Tour

== Sources ==
- Municipal Incorporations of the State of New Jersey (according to Counties) prepared by the Division of Local Government, Department of the Treasury (New Jersey); December 1, 1958.
- Bischoff, Henry; and Kahn, Mitchell. From Pioneer Settlement to Suburb, A History of Mahwah, New Jersey, 1700–1976, A.S. Barnes and Company, 1976?; re-print Mahwah Historical Society, 2005.
- Clayton, W. Woodford; and Nelson, William. History of Bergen and Passaic Counties, New Jersey, with Biographical Sketches of Many of its Pioneers and Prominent Men. Philadelphia: Everts and Peck, 1882.
- Harvey, Cornelius Burnham (ed.), Genealogical History of Hudson and Bergen Counties, New Jersey. New York: New Jersey Genealogical Publishing Co., 1900.
- Van Valen, James M. History of Bergen County, New Jersey. New York: New Jersey Publishing and Engraving Co., 1900.
- Westervelt, Frances A. (Frances Augusta), 1858–1942, History of Bergen County, New Jersey, 1630–1923, Lewis Historical Publishing Company, 1923.
