= Ridgewood Township, New Jersey =

Township in Bergen County, New Jersey, US

Coordinates: 40°58′17.77″N 74°7′14.29″W

Ridgewood Township existed in Bergen County, New Jersey, and was established on March 30, 1876, consisting of the easternmost third of what remained of Franklin Township, west of the Saddle River.

Ridgewood Township lasted a mere 18 years, before it was subdivided in 1894, at the peak of the "boroughitis" phenomenon that was sweeping through Bergen County at the time. Midland Park was incorporated as a borough on September 6, 1894, and also included portions of Franklin Township. Glen Rock was formed on September 12, 1894, and also included territory that had been part of Saddle River Township. The Village of Ridgewood was incorporated on November 20, 1894, replacing the municipal government of Ridgewood Township.
