= Boroughitis =

1890s boom of new boroughs in New Jersey, US

The 70 municipalities of Bergen County, New Jersey

Boroughitis (also borough fever or borough mania) was the creation in the 1890s, usually by referendum, of large numbers of small boroughs in the U.S. state of New Jersey, particularly in Bergen County. Attempts by the New Jersey Legislature to reform local government and school systems led to the breakup of most of Bergen County's townships into small boroughs, which still balkanize the state's political map. This occurred following the development of commuter suburbs in New Jersey, residents of which wanted more government services, whereas the long-time rural population feared the increases in taxation that would result.

In the late 19th century, much of New Jersey was divided into large townships. In Bergen County, several of these townships contained multiple commuter suburbs, often formed around railroad stations. Political disputes arose between the growing number of commuters, who wanted more government services for the new developments near railroad lines, and long-time residents such as farmers, who understood this to come with higher taxes. A previously little-used law permitted small segments of existing townships to vote by referendum to form independent boroughs. In late 1893, Republicans, backed by commuters, captured control of the legislature; the following year, they passed legislation allowing boroughs that were formed from parts of two or more townships to elect a representative to the county Board of Chosen Freeholders. This 1894 act, in combination with a second one the same year that consolidated school districts into one per municipality, made it easy and attractive for dissatisfied communities to break away and become boroughs, in order to gain a seat on the county board or to keep control of the local school.

Forty new boroughs were formed in 1894 and 1895, with the bulk in Bergen County, where most townships were broken up or greatly reduced in size; there are few there today. The state legislature scuttled the right to elect a freeholder in 1895, and ended the formation of boroughs by referendum the following year. Municipalities continued to be created by the legislature into the 20th century, and although there have been efforts at consolidation in recent years to lower the high cost of government, they have not been particularly effective.

== Background ==
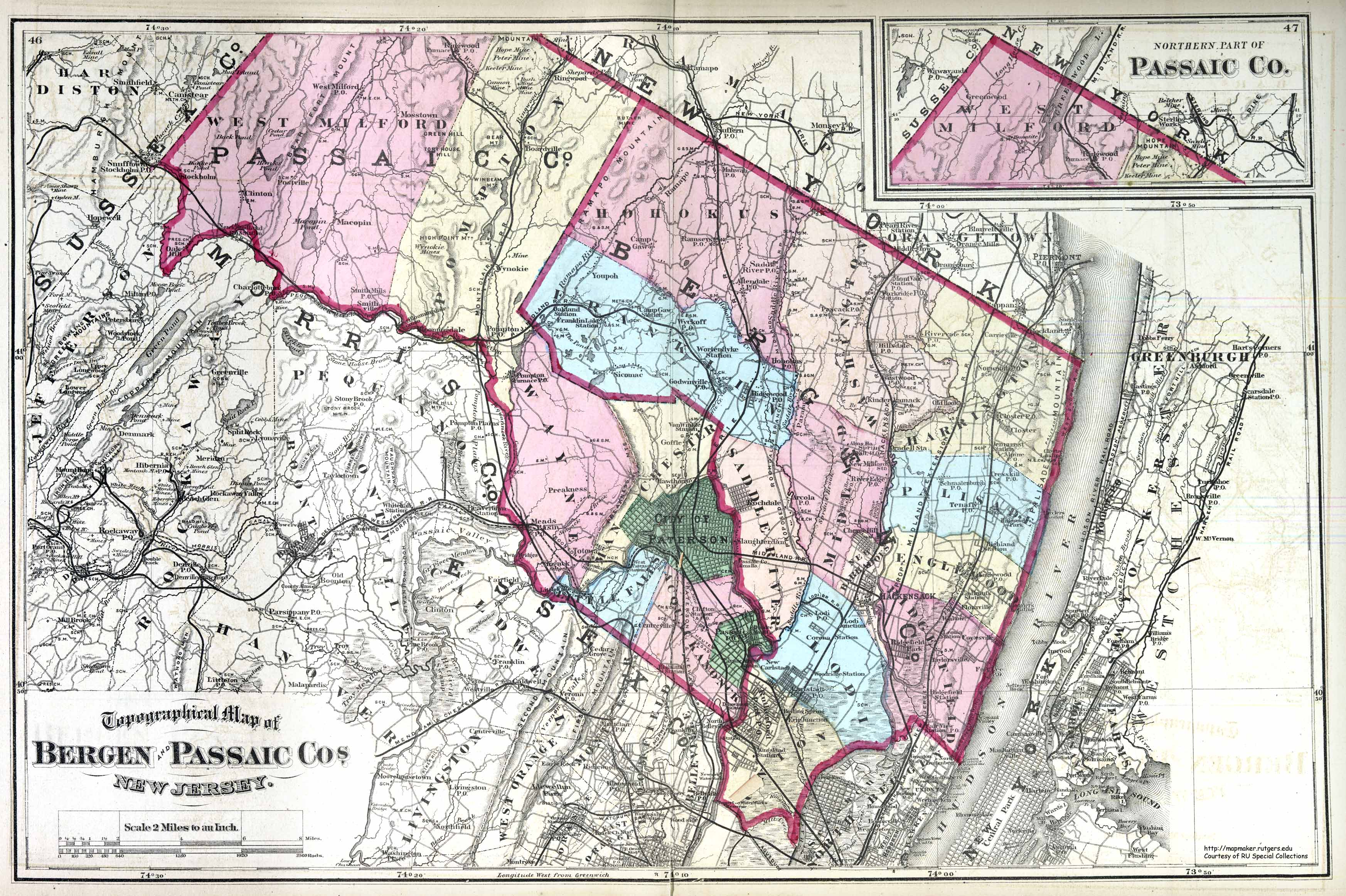
Bergen County (and neighboring Passaic County) in 1872

At the time of the union of East Jersey and West Jersey into the Province of New Jersey in 1702, there were about 24 townships; more were added under British government by letters patent, court decrees, or legislative action. Following the American Revolutionary War, the New Jersey Legislature confirmed all municipal charters, and granted new ones; by 1798, the state had 104 townships. Increased economic activity in Essex, Morris and Sussex counties, and the formation of Warren County, raised the number to 125 by 1834.

Most of the townships had low taxes and little government; the roads (mostly of dirt) were maintained by farmers in lieu of taxes. Township meetings occurred each February; the citizens would discuss concerns, voluntarily seek solutions, and collectively appoint agents to carry out their will. Voters in each township elected members of the county governing body, the Board of Chosen Freeholders.

The railroad brought major changes to New Jersey beginning in the mid-19th century. The state was mostly agricultural, and the new lines made it easier for farmers to get their crops to market. But they also made it easier for those employed in New York City or Philadelphia to live outside the urban core and yet commute to work each day. Even before the Civil War, the Brick Church station, in Orange, Essex County, about 15 miles (24 km) from New York City, became the center of the nation's first commuter suburb. New Jersey's townships acquired a new type of population, consisting of commuters, who formed communities near railroad stations, and who wanted good streets and roads, better funded schools, and a larger stake in the government. They were fiercely opposed on each issue by the existing rural, agricultural population, who understood that their taxes would need to be raised in order to pay for the services that they did not want.

Schools and school districts caused angry debate between commuters and long-time residents. School district lines were independent of those of townships, for every school formed its own school district. Accordingly, townships could contain a number of school districts: Bergen County's Franklin Township in the early 1890s contained eleven school districts serving 774 students. Of the 94 schools in Bergen County in 1893, 31 were one-room schoolhouses, though this was a decrease from 44 in 1880. Bergen County was sparsely populated when the railroad lines went through in the 1850s, making for a different pattern of development than other suburban counties, such as Union and Camden, which saw more planned development around railroad stations. Bergen's pattern of development was unique in New Jersey, with, until 1894, several commuter suburbs in a single township, something rare elsewhere in the state.

The town-meeting style of government then prescribed for townships proved ill-suited to those changing times. The New Jersey Constitution gave the state government in Trenton relatively weak powers over the townships, but from time to time the legislature attempted reform. The townships were divided into road districts, with residents appointed to see that maintenance was done; in 1859, the state allowed residents of each district to elect a road commissioner, who saw to it their road taxes were spent effectively. Many of these districts later became individual municipalities, with the road commissioner often the first mayor.

== Legislation ==
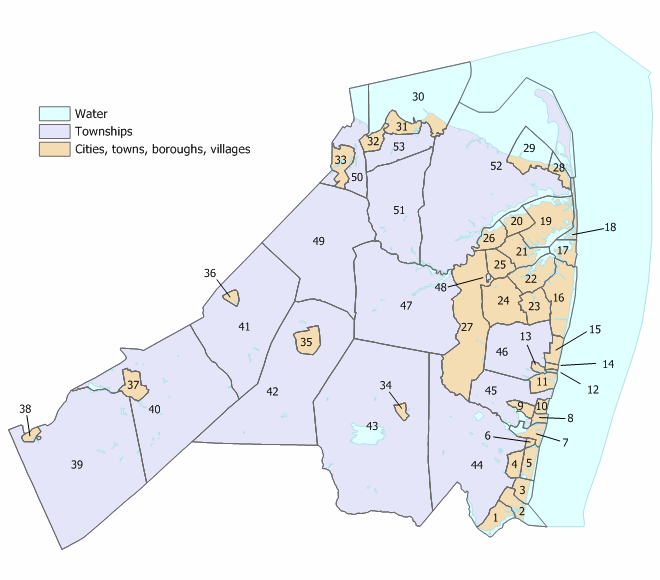
Monmouth County displays a number of "doughnut holes" where boroughs have seceded from the townships around them.

Until 1875, municipalities had been created or modified only by special acts of the legislature, but a state constitutional amendment that year abolished special laws for individual municipalities. Thereafter, lawmakers passed general laws regarding municipalities, and left incorporation of new ones to referendums in areas wanting redress, and to the courts. In 1878, the legislature passed the Borough Act, allowing landowners in an area less than 4 square miles (10 km^{2}) and with fewer than 1,000 people to seek a referendum on secession from the township to become a new borough. This referendum could take place on petition of the owners of 10 percent of the land, as measured by value, in the area in question, and 10 days' notice of the vote was required. In 1882, the legislature expanded this measure to allow areas of less than 2 square miles (5.2 km^{2}) to become borough commissions with some autonomy within the township. Another impetus towards more municipalities developed in the 1870s, with the New Jersey public soured on the railroads because of the Panic of 1873. The newly Democratic legislature passed laws that ended tax exemptions on railroad-owned lands. Much of the land, generally near stations, was sold off, and was transformed into communities that in the following years would secede from the township in which they lay, creating some of the "doughnut holes", with boroughs surrounded by the townships they were formerly part of, that mark the New Jersey municipal landscape today.

In the 1893 elections, Republicans recaptured control of the New Jersey Legislature. This was due in part to another economic depression, the Panic of 1893, which had occurred with Democrat Grover Cleveland in the White House, and in part because some Democrats, like Republicans before them, had proven corrupt. The increasing commuter population also played a role; Bergen County contained (and still does) many commuter communities because of its proximity to New York City. These new residents were strongly Republican, as contrasted with the Democratic farmers. According to Bergen County historian Kevin Wright, "Having gained sufficient numbers by 1893 to challenge Punkin Dusters at the polls, the Commuters of Bergen County led a political revolution in Home Rule that finally toppled the ancien régime." Legal disputes about control of the New Jersey Senate and the Republican desire to undo many Democratic policies occupied the legislature in the early part of its 1894 session. Nevertheless, interest groups such as local landowners pushed the legislature for permissive policies on municipal incorporation, hoping to gain power in the new governments.

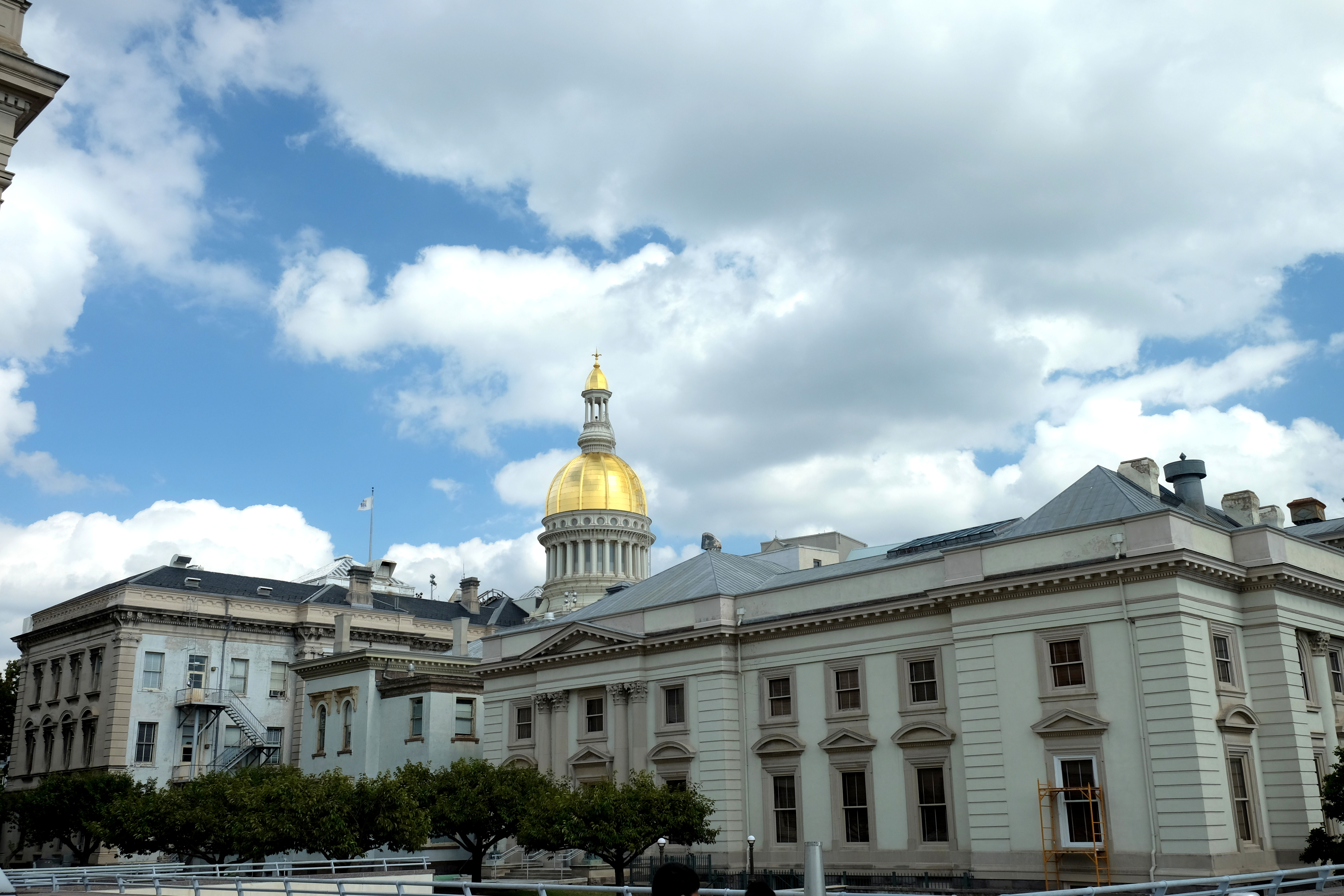
The New Jersey State House in Trenton, where the 1894 acts were passed

As the legislature sat, the townships of Bergen County fractured. The provision of the Borough Act allowing separation had been little used prior to 1893, and in 1893, Bergen County had only three boroughs. A year-long legal battle in Palisades Township, along the Hudson River, led to a referendum that saw Tenafly break away in January 1894. Some communities seceded in early 1894 because of disputes about how to pay for macadamized roads, which were first paved through much of Bergen County in the first half of the 1890s. The Hackensack Republican reported on March 1, "the chief reason why Delford [later Oradell], Westwood, Hillsdale and Park Ridge want to become boroughs is that they may avoid what is feared will be heavy macadam tax". The proposed borough of Delford would take land from multiple townships, uniting communities on both sides of the Hackensack River that shared a school, but incorporation was put on hold because of legal uncertainty as to whether a borough could be formed from parts of more than one township.

WHEREAS, doubts have arisen whether the provisions of the above-mentioned [Borough Act of 1878] apply to boroughs embracing within their territory parts of more than one township ... [it is enacted] that at the election for borough officers the legal voters of each such borough shall be entitled to vote for a chosen freeholder who shall represent such borough in the board of chosen freeholders of the county in which such borough is situated, and be a member of such board ...

— Chapter CLXXVI of the Public Laws of 1894, State of New Jersey (May 9, 1894)

In April, the Republican majority in Trenton let it be known they were working on a bill to solve Delford's problem by allowing boroughs to be formed from portions of two or more townships, and this became the Act of May 9, 1894. The act also granted such boroughs a seat on the county Board of Chosen Freeholders. According to Wright, "the consequences of casting special legislation under guise of a general law soon became patent". Since 1885, new boroughs had not gotten their own freeholder, with borough voters instead joining with those in the township they were formerly part of to elect one. Partisans saw the political possibilities of the 1894 law, and contested control of the Bergen County government through the formation of boroughs that would elect freeholders of their party.

The energetic legislators finally reached school reform with Chapter CCCXXXV of the Public Laws of 1894. That act, passed on May 25, provided that "the several school districts in each township shall be consolidated into one school district". The legislature's intent was to equalize funding between wealthier districts and poorer ones. This had the effect of eliminating more than 1,000 school districts statewide. Had the legislature done no more, according to former New Jersey General Assembly Speaker Alan Karcher, "New Jersey might have had fewer than 500 municipalities today". However, the legislature further enacted in the bill, "that each city, borough, and incorporated town, shall be a school district, separate and distinct from the township school district". Thus, if a community seceded from its township to form a borough, it would keep control of its school. The new township school districts would be responsible for the debts of their predecessors, meaning that some communities faced the prospect of paying off, in part, the debts of others, and seeing some of their tax dollars going to fund others' schools. Under the law, by becoming an incorporated borough, they could avoid these things.

The school legislation greatly fueled the borough craze in Bergen County. Wealthy communities that had had their own school districts now faced the prospect of sharing their school tax revenues with poorer areas, or of being divided up piecemeal in borough referendums. Allendale broke away, principally from Franklin Township, because of such fears. At 650 people, Allendale was one of the more populous boroughs formed in 1894. In commuter communities such as Park Ridge, the new residents often led the borough drives against the opposition of the old inhabitants who feared the improvements would not benefit them and that the new borough would quickly incur debt through issuance of municipal bonds.

Another new borough created by the residents to keep local school control was Woodcliff, which was formed around the settlement of Pascack from parts of Harrington Township and Orvil Township, and which in 1910 became Woodcliff Lake. Rural Upper Saddle River broke away from Orvil Township and Hohokus Township, taking one of Orvil Township's six schoolhouses – the press noted that the nascent borough would most likely go Democratic as only 16 Republicans could be found. Ridgewood, then a township, avoided further depredations by Midland Park and Glen Rock by incorporating as a village. The borough of Wood-Ridge was formed after the boundary lines were carefully drawn with an eye to the referendum, to exclude the home of a family of prominent landowners who were opposed to the incorporation – though not excluding their farmland. Once Wood-Ridge was successfully established, the farmhouse was annexed by borough ordinance. The secession of Wood-Ridge from Bergen Township, together with that of Carlstadt, Moonachie and Wallington, left Bergen Township with only a patch of low-lying swampland and 61 voters; the legislature in 1902 annexed it to Lodi Township.

Of the 40 boroughs created in 1894 and 1895, 26 were in Bergen County. The ones elsewhere included Roselle and Mountainside, in Union County. In September 1894, state Senator Henry D. Winton warned that the legislature at its next session was likely to amend if not gut the Borough Act because of the craze in Bergen County. Nine new members had been added to the Board of Chosen Freeholders from the previous sixteen, Winton noted, with a proportionate increase in the cost of government, which would be further inflated by the multiplicity of boroughs. The signal that the law might change did not slow the incorporations: Wood-Ridge, Carlstadt, Edgewater, Old Tappan and other boroughs trace their geneses to late 1894. There were some fistfights and hard feelings over the borough formations, and Russell Jones, whose house was on the newly drawn line between Teaneck and Bogota, saw it burn down as firefighters argued about who had jurisdiction.

== Aftermath and legacy ==
We believe that there are many boroughs in this State which have no sufficient excuse for existence, which were prompted by some local desire for extravagant improvement, or were a part of a scheme of speculation to encourage the sale of real estate, or were the outgrowth of sectional or local jealousy which found too easy a vent in the facility which the borough law afforded for the creation of a new municipality. We have not thought it advisable, however, to question in any way the existence of any of these boroughs or, in rehabilitating them, to make any distinction between those that ought to exist and those that ought not. It will be sufficient for the present, we trust, to guard against the increase of such boroughs.

— State Senator Foster M. Voorhees, report of the Joint Committee to Revise the Laws Concerning Boroughs, March 25, 1896

The wave of incorporations continued into 1895, with Cliffside Park gaining borough status in January. That month, Bergen County's school superintendent, John Terhune, wrote a report to Trenton, decrying that the law allowed borough petitioners to set the proposed lines to exclude opponents of incorporation, "The idea of allowing a bare majority the power to accept or reject a few that have dared to oppose the new fad, and for this simple expression of their rights to cut them from all school facilities is radically wrong and gross injustice. There is no defense for the injured, but they must meekly accept the situation. It is inconsistent with liberty, a term so dear to us all". Superintendent Terhune wrote that "until the boroughing is done", it would not be possible to assess the many problems that the rapid subdivision had caused: "I would not attempt to estimate, let alone approximate, the changes caused by the boroughs. It is simply inconceivable".

The Act of February 18, 1895, amended the previous year's borough bill to raise the requirement for incorporation petitions from owners of 10 percent of the land value to 50 percent. The rush was also slowed by the legislature deciding that no borough created thereafter could maintain a separate school system unless there were at least 400 children living within its limits. In February, though, Passaic County saw its only instance of boroughitis, with Pompton Lakes breaking away from Pompton Township, as residents of the new borough had felt they paid a disproportionate share of the township's tax burden. With the Bergen County Board of Chosen Freeholders by then at 28 members, divided evenly between the parties, the legislature passed a bill setting the number of members of such boards in third-class counties (including Bergen) at 9, with the freeholders elected from the Delford-style boroughs to go out of office on May 8. Nevertheless, on May 9, electors in what became the borough of Englewood Cliffs voted to secede from Englewood, 34–1.

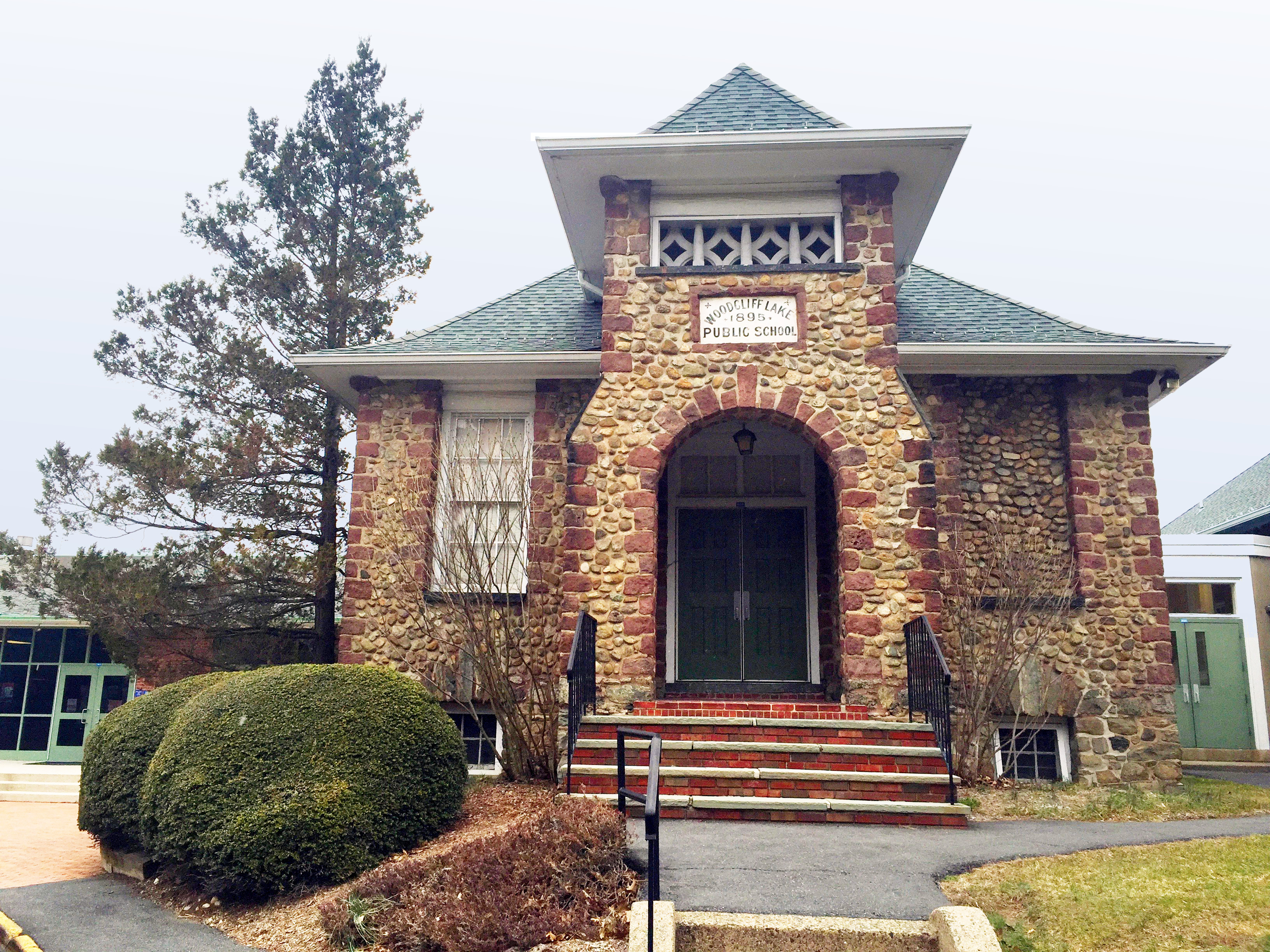
The Woodcliff School, Woodcliff Lake, Bergen County. The schoolhouse built for the new borough in 1895 is still part of its middle school.

North Arlington was incorporated as a borough by a referendum held on March 26, 1896, the day the state legislature passed a bill providing that, "no borough or village shall hereafter be incorporated in this state except by special act of the legislature." According to lawyer Alfred F. Skinner in his 1916 book on the law pertaining to New Jersey boroughs, the 1896 act "was intended to express a legislative policy, and was based upon the conclusion that the method of incorporation [of new boroughs] by petition and election, within a territory defined by the petitioners, was a dangerous delegation of a power that should be exercised by the legislature only". The following year, the legislature undertook a thorough revision of the laws relating to boroughs, and forbade incorporations, dissolutions, or boundary changes without its leave. This simply moved the venue for conflicts over schools from local referendums to the corridors of the State House in Trenton. Boroughs continued to be incorporated by legislative act, with a major burst in the 1920s. These 20th century increases in the number of boroughs were sometimes caused by conflicts over road funds, causing Caldwell Township, Essex County, to divide into six municipalities by 1908, and with Clementon Township, Camden County fracturing into nine between 1915 and 1929.

By the 1920s, the number of municipalities in Bergen County had reached 70, where it still stands. After the 1920s, the legislature did not create many new municipalities, but local officials used zoning to affect land use, making annexation less attractive. Because of boroughitis, the township as a form of government all but disappeared from Bergen County. One that remains is South Hackensack, the remnants of Lodi Township that no seceding borough wanted. Its three pieces are separated from each other by several miles.

A number of boroughs became townships in the early 1980s, though they did not necessarily change their form of government, as until 1986, more federal aid was available to municipalities called townships than to those styled boroughs. As of 2022, with the merger that year of Pine Valley into Pine Hill, New Jersey has 564 municipalities and the most municipalities per capita of any state. Its boroughs include Teterboro in Bergen County, site of an airport, industrial buildings, and the homes of fewer than a hundred residents, and Tavistock in Camden County, consisting primarily of a country club. Governor Chris Christie urged consolidation to lower the cost of government, and a number of municipalities have studied it, but there have been few recent mergers, with the other one being the merger of Princeton Borough with Princeton Township in 2012.

Karcher, both while Speaker and afterwards, promoted consolidation, but saw it fall victim to home rule advocates. He discussed the long-term effect of the boroughitis craze:

The ultimate cost to the state's taxpayers ... directly attributable to the Republican reforms of 1894, is incalculable. One need only take an afternoon drive through Bergen County. The only evidence that you have traversed one borough in the last five minutes and are now entering another, which may take only three minutes to cross, is a sign. Otherwise, it is virtually impossible to tell one fungible borough from the other. Yet each has its own most prized possession, and prized it should be considering its cost: its own school district.

== Sources ==
- Bruck, Andrew I.; Pinto III, H. Joseph (2008). "Overruled by Home Rule: The Problems with New Jersey's Latest Effort to Consolidate Municipalities". Seton Hall Legislative Journal. 32 (2): 287–350.
- Chazotte, Irma, ed. (1997). One Hundred Years of Woodcliff Lake Heritage, 1894–1994. Woodcliff Lake [New Jersey] Centennial Book Committee. OCLC 55524597.
- Cunningham, John T. (1998). This is New Jersey (4th ed.). Rutgers University Press. ISBN 978-0-8135-2141-1.
- Karcher, Alan (1998). New Jersey's Multiple Municipal Madness (Kindle ed.). Rutgers University Press. ISBN 978-0-8135-2566-2.
- Ridgewood, Bergen County, New Jersey, Past and Present. Citizens Semi-Centennial Association [Ridgewood, NJ]. 1916. OCLC 11745553.
- Skinner, Alfred F. (1916). The New Jersey Borough Law: Containing the Revision of 1897, Supplements and Amendments Thereto, Notes of the Decisions, and a collection of forms (4th ed.). Soney & Sage. OCLC 1048178376.
- Snyder, John P. (1969). The Story of New Jersey's Civil Boundaries, 1606–1968 (PDF). Department of Geology and Topography. OCLC 23824.
- Westervelt, Frances A., ed. (1923). History of Bergen County New Jersey 1630–1923. Vol. 1. Lewis Historical Publishing Company, Inc.
