= Franklin Township, Bergen County, New Jersey =

Coordinates: 41.020°N 74.183°W

Historical population
Census	Pop.	Note	%±
1900	2,139		—
1910	1,054		−50.7%
1920	1,671		58.5%

Franklin Township was a township that existed in Bergen County, New Jersey, United States from 1771 until 1926.

Franklin Township was established by Royal Charter on June 1, 1771, when Saddle River Township was subdivided. The Township was named after the colonial-era Governor of New Jersey William Franklin, the illegitimate son of Benjamin Franklin. By 1755, about 100 families lived in the Franklin Township area.

Pompton Township was formed from portions of the township on April 10, 1796, ultimately becoming part of Passaic County when it was created on February 7, 1837.

On April 9, 1849, Hohokus Township was created from the northern part of Franklin Township and extended from the Saddle River on the east to the western boundary of Bergen County with Passaic County and north to the New York border. On March 30, 1876, Ridgewood Township was created, consisting of the easternmost third of what remained of Franklin Township.

Franklin Township was further subdivided with the creation of Midland Park (September 6, 1894), Oakland (April 8, 1902) and Franklin Lakes (seceded March 11, 1922). The size of Franklin Township decreased as areas seceded and were incorporated as independent municipalities.

After Franklin Lakes was established, Franklin Township consisted only of the area known locally as Wyckoff. On November 2, 1926, residents voted in a referendum (243 positive votes out of 337) to change the name from Franklin Township to become the Township of Wyckoff.

== Sources ==
- "History of Bergen County, New Jersey, 1630-1923;" by "Westervelt, Frances A. (Frances Augusta), 1858-1942."
- "Municipal Incorporations of the State of New Jersey (according to Counties)" prepared by the Division of Local Government, Department of the Treasury (New Jersey); December 1, 1958.
