= Northvale, New Jersey =

Borough in Bergen County, New Jersey, US

- Borough
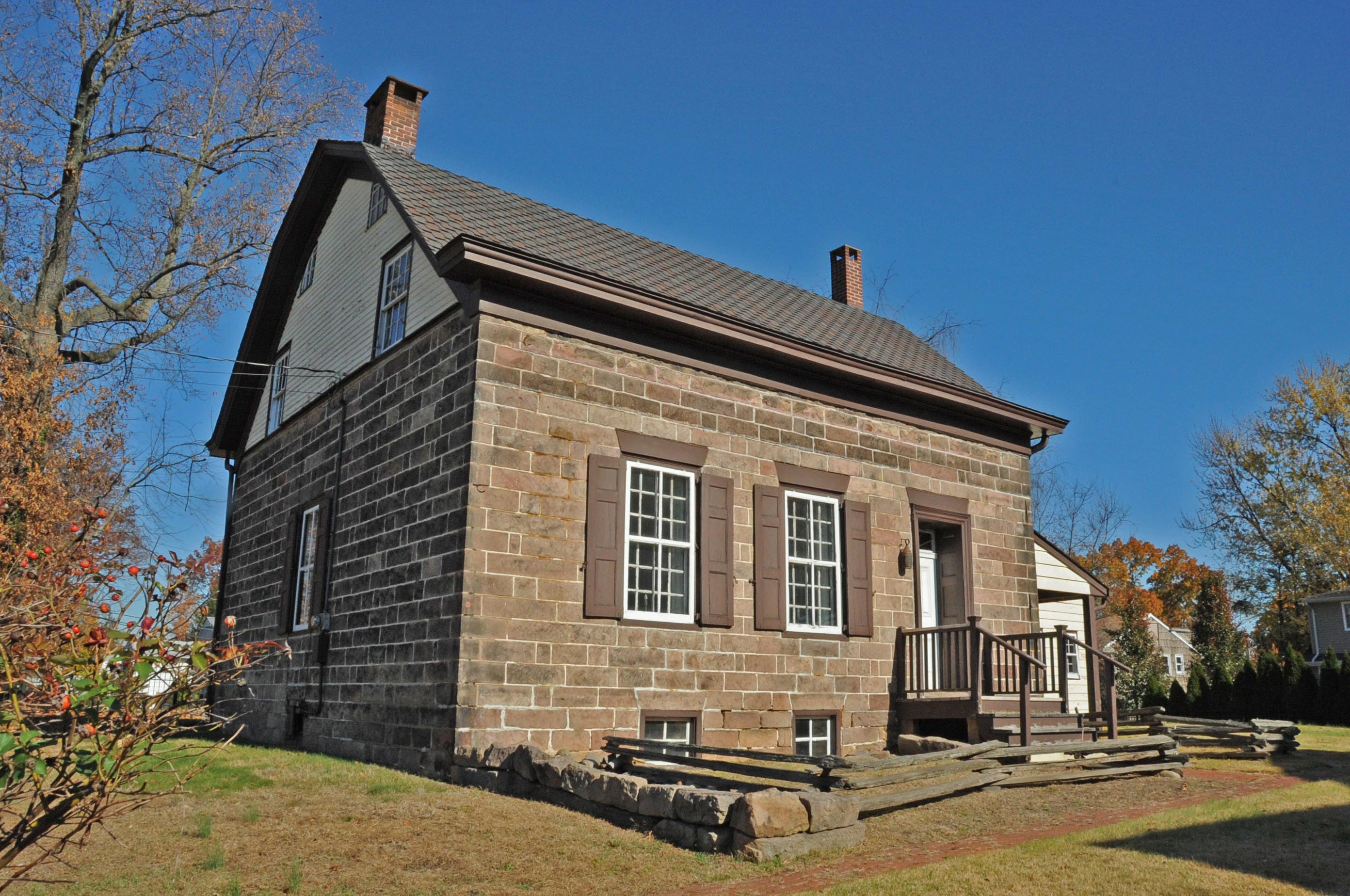
- Haring-Blauvelt House

- Seal

- Location of Northvale in Bergen County highlighted in red (left). Inset map: Location of Bergen County in New Jersey highlighted in orange (right).

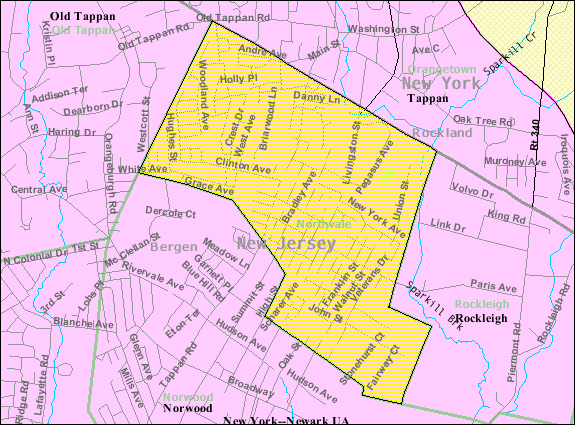
- Census Bureau map of Northvale, New Jersey

- Location in Bergen County Location in New Jersey Location in the United States
- Coordinates: 41.013004°N 73.948085°W
- Country: United States
- State: New Jersey
- County: Bergen
- Incorporated: March 15, 1916

Government
  - Type: Borough
  - Body: Borough Council
  - Mayor: Joseph E. McGuire (R, term ends December 31, 2026)
  - Municipal clerk: Frances Weston

Area
  - Total: 1.27 sq mi (3.28 km^{2})
  - Land: 1.27 sq mi (3.28 km^{2})
  - Water: 0.0039 sq mi (0.01 km^{2}) 0.24%
  - Rank: 478th of 565 in state 61st of 70 in county
- Elevation: 46 ft (14 m)

Population (2020)
  - Total: 4,761
  - Estimate (2023): 4,821
  - Rank: 387th of 565 in state 61st of 70 in county
  - Density: 3,763.8/sq mi (1,453.2/km^{2})
  - Rank: 176th of 565 in state 38th of 70 in county
- Time zone: UTC−05:00 (Eastern (EST))
  - Summer (DST): UTC−04:00 (Eastern (EDT))
- ZIP Code: 07647
- Area code: 201 exchanges: 750, 767, 768, 784
- FIPS code: 3400353430
- GNIS feature ID: 0885327
- Website: www.northvalenj.org

Northvale is a borough in Bergen County, in the U.S. state of New Jersey. As of the 2020 United States census, the borough's population was 4,761, an increase of 121 (+2.6%) from the 2010 census count of 4,640, which in turn reflected an increase of 180 (+4.0%) from the 4,460 counted in the 2000 census.

== History ==
The borough of Northvale was formed on March 15, 1916, from the remaining portions of Harrington Township, based on the results of a referendum held on April 4, 1916. With the creation of Northvale, Harrington Township was dissolved. Portions of Northvale were transferred to create the borough of Rockleigh, as of March 13, 1923. The borough's name derives from its location and topography.

== Geography ==
According to the United States Census Bureau, the borough had a total area of 1.27 square miles (3.28 km^{2}), including 1.27 square miles (3.28 km^{2}) of land and <0.01 square miles (0.01 km^{2}) of water (0.24%).

The borough borders Norwood, Old Tappan and Rockleigh in Bergen County; and Tappan (in the Town of Orangetown) in Rockland County, New York.

== Demographics ==
Historical population
| Census | Pop. | Note | %± |
|---|---|---|---|
| 1900 | 387 | | — |
| 1910 | 588 | | 51.9% |
| 1920 | 827 | | 40.6% |
| 1930 | 1,144 | * | 38.3% |
| 1940 | 1,159 | | 1.3% |
| 1950 | 1,455 | | 25.5% |
| 1960 | 2,892 | | 98.8% |
| 1970 | 5,177 | | 79.0% |
| 1980 | 5,046 | | −2.5% |
| 1990 | 4,563 | | −9.6% |
| 2000 | 4,460 | | −2.3% |
| 2010 | 4,640 | | 4.0% |
| 2020 | 4,761 | | 2.6% |
| 2023 (est.) | 4,821 | ▲ | 1.3% |
Population sources: 1920; 1910–1930 1900–2020; 2000 2010 2020 * = Lost territory in previous decade.

=== Racial and ethnic composition ===
Northvale borough, New Jersey – Racial and ethnic composition Note: the US Census treats Hispanic/Latino as an ethnic category. This table excludes Latinos from the racial categories and assigns them to a separate category. Hispanics/Latinos may be of any race.
| Race / Ethnicity (NH = Non-Hispanic) | Pop 2000 | Pop 2010 | Pop 2020 | % 2000 | % 2010 | % 2020 |
|---|---|---|---|---|---|---|
| White alone (NH) | 3,553 | 3,039 | 2,714 | 79.66% | 65.50% | 57.00% |
| Black or African American alone (NH) | 32 | 46 | 55 | 0.72% | 0.99% | 1.16% |
| Native American or Alaska Native alone (NH) | 0 | 3 | 0 | 0.00% | 0.06% | 0.00% |
| Asian alone (NH) | 626 | 1,110 | 1,278 | 14.04% | 23.92% | 26.84% |
| Native Hawaiian or Pacific Islander alone (NH) | 0 | 1 | 0 | 0.00% | 0.02% | 0.00% |
| Other race alone (NH) | 7 | 5 | 13 | 0.16% | 0.11% | 0.27% |
| Mixed race or Multiracial (NH) | 31 | 58 | 132 | 0.70% | 1.25% | 2.77% |
| Hispanic or Latino (any race) | 211 | 378 | 569 | 4.73% | 8.15% | 11.95% |
| Total | 4,460 | 4,640 | 4,761 | 100.00% | 100.00% | 100.00% |

=== 2020 census ===
As of the 2020 census, Northvale had a population of 4,761.

The median age was 43.5 years. 21.0% of residents were under the age of 18 and 17.6% were 65 years of age or older. For every 100 females, there were 98.4 males, and for every 100 females age 18 and over, there were 95.6 males age 18 and over.

100.0% of residents lived in urban areas, while 0.0% lived in rural areas.

There were 1,641 households, of which 37.2% had children under the age of 18 living in them. Of all households, 63.2% were married-couple households, 12.0% were households with a male householder and no spouse or partner present, and 21.7% were households with a female householder and no spouse or partner present. About 18.9% of all households were made up of individuals, and 11.7% had someone living alone who was 65 years of age or older.

There were 1,700 housing units, of which 3.5% were vacant. The homeowner vacancy rate was 1.2% and the rental vacancy rate was 4.9%.

=== 2010 census ===
The 2010 United States census counted 4,640 people, 1,564 households, and 1,265 families in the borough. The population density was 3,582.3 per square mile (1,383.1/km^{2}). There were 1,635 housing units at an average density of 1,262.3 per square mile (487.4/km^{2}). The racial makeup was 71.94% (3,338) White, 1.06% (49) Black or African American, 0.19% (9) Native American, 24.01% (1,114) Asian, 0.02% (1) Pacific Islander, 1.14% (53) from other races, and 1.64% (76) from two or more races. Hispanic or Latino of any race were 8.15% (378) of the population. Korean Americans accounted for 16.3% of the population.

Of the 1,564 households, 38.7% had children under the age of 18; 67.8% were married couples living together; 10.0% had a female householder with no husband present and 19.1% were non-families. Of all households, 16.3% were made up of individuals and 8.8% had someone living alone who was 65 years of age or older. The average household size was 2.96 and the average family size was 3.32.

25.2% of the population were under the age of 18, 6.7% from 18 to 24, 23.2% from 25 to 44, 30.3% from 45 to 64, and 14.6% who were 65 years of age or older. The median age was 42.2 years. For every 100 females, the population had 98.7 males. For every 100 females ages 18 and older there were 93.8 males.

The Census Bureau's 2006–2010 American Community Survey showed that (in 2010 inflation-adjusted dollars) median household income was $86,607 (with a margin of error of +/− $13,519) and the median family income was $89,125 (+/− $16,380). Males had a median income of $66,563 (+/− $14,582) versus $31,228 (+/− $7,496) for females. The per capita income for the borough was $35,404 (+/− $4,301). About 3.7% of families and 4.1% of the population were below the poverty line, including 1.7% of those under age 18 and 5.9% of those age 65 or over.

Same-sex couples headed 9 households in 2010, an increase of 50% from the 6 counted in 2000.

=== 2000 census ===
As of the 2000 United States census there were 4,460 people, 1,575 households, and 1,236 families residing in the borough. The population density was 3,381.2 inhabitants per square mile (1,305.5/km^{2}). There were 1,596 housing units at an average density of 1,210.0 per square mile (467.2/km^{2}). The racial makeup of the borough was 82.91% White, 0.76% African American, 0.07% Native American, 14.06% Asian, 1.17% from other races, and 1.03% from two or more races. Hispanic or Latino of any race were 4.73% of the population.

There were 1,575 households, out of which 33.6% had children under the age of 18 living with them, 66.2% were married couples living together, 8.1% had a female householder with no husband present, and 21.5% were non-families. 18.5% of all households were made up of individuals, and 10.3% had someone living alone who was 65 years of age or older. The average household size was 2.83 and the average family size was 3.21.

In the borough the population was spread out, with 22.5% under the age of 18, 6.4% from 18 to 24, 29.3% from 25 to 44, 25.9% from 45 to 64, and 16.0% who were 65 years of age or older. The median age was 40 years. For every 100 females, there were 99.3 males. For every 100 females age 18 and over, there were 94.2 males.

The median income for a household in the borough was $72,500, and the median income for a family was $81,153. Males had a median income of $50,901 versus $37,563 for females. The per capita income for the borough was $28,206. About 2.4% of families and 3.9% of the population were below the poverty line, including 6.9% of those under age 18 and 1.4% of those age 65 or over.

== Government ==
=== Local government ===
Northvale is governed under the borough form of New Jersey municipal government, which is used in 218 municipalities (of the 564) statewide, making it the most common form of government in New Jersey. The governing body is comprised of a mayor and a borough council, with all positions elected at-large on a partisan basis as part of the November general election. A mayor is elected directly by the voters to a four-year term of office. The borough council includes six members elected to serve three-year terms on a staggered basis, with two seats coming up for election each year in a three-year cycle. The borough form of government used by Northvale is a "weak mayor / strong council" government in which council members act as the legislative body with the mayor presiding at meetings and voting only in the event of a tie. The mayor can veto ordinances subject to an override by a two-thirds majority vote of the council. The mayor makes committee and liaison assignments for council members, and most appointments are made by the mayor with the advice and consent of the council.

As of 2023, the mayor of Northvale is Republican Joseph E. McGuire, whose term of office ends December 31, 2026. Members of the Borough Council are Thomas R. Argiro (D, 2023), John M. Hogan (D, 2023), Martin Mattessich (R, 2025), Kara McMorrow (R, 2024), Domenich Menafra (R, 2025), Roy Sokoloski (R, 2024; appointed to serve an unexpired term).

In February 2023, Roy Sokoloski was appointed to fill the seat expiring in December 2024 that had been held by Joseph McGuire until he resigned from office.

In December 2015, the borough council selected Michael Small from a list of three candidates nominated by the Democratic municipal committee to fill the seat vacated by Gloria Libby, who had left office earlier that month to follow her employer, Mercedes-Benz USA, which had relocated its headquarters from Bergen County to Atlanta.

In March 2014, Mayor Paul Bazela resigned from office after being convicted of theft in his role as operations manager for the Passaic Valley Sewerage Commission, after a jury found that he had used PVSC employees to repair the homes of individuals connected to him. Then-Borough Council President Ed Piehler was chosen to succeed him as acting mayor.

=== Federal, state and county representation ===
Northvale is located in the 5th Congressional District and is part of New Jersey's 39th state legislative district.

For the 119th United States Congress, New Jersey's 5th congressional district is represented by Josh Gottheimer (D, Wyckoff). New Jersey is represented in the United States Senate by Democrats Cory Booker (Newark, term ends 2027) and Andy Kim (Moorestown, term ends 2031).

For the 2026–2027 session, the 39th legislative district of the New Jersey Legislature is represented in the State Senate by Holly Schepisi (R, River Vale) and in the General Assembly by Robert Auth (R, Old Tappan) and John V. Azzariti (R, Saddle River).

Bergen County is governed by a directly elected County Executive, with legislative functions performed by a Board of County Commissioners comprised of seven members who are elected at-large to three-year terms in partisan elections on a staggered basis, with either two or three seats coming up for election each November; a Chairman and Vice Chairman are selected from among its seven members at a reorganization meeting held every January. As of 2025, the county executive is James J. Tedesco III (D, Paramus), whose four-year term of office ends December 31, 2026.

Bergen County's Commissioners are Chair Mary J. Amoroso (D, Mahwah, 2025), Vice Chair Steven A. Tanelli (D, North Arlington, 2027), Chair Pro Tem Joan Voss (D, Fort Lee, 2026), Rafael Marte (D, Bergenfield, 2026), Germaine M. Ortiz (D, Emerson, 2025), Thomas J. Sullivan Jr. (D, Montvale, 2025) and Tracy Silna Zur (D, Franklin Lakes, 2027).

Bergen County's elected constitutional officials are Clerk John S. Hogan (D, Northvale, 2026), Sheriff Anthony Cureton (D, Englewood, 2027) and Surrogate Michael R. Dressler (D, Cresskill, 2026).

=== Politics ===
United States presidential election results for Northvale 2024 2020 2016 2012 2008 2004
| Year | Republican | | Democratic | | Third party(ies) | |
| Year | No. | % | No. | % | No. | % |
|---|---|---|---|---|---|---|
| 2024 | 1,367 | 53.82% | 1,138 | 44.80% | 35 | 1.38% |
| 2020 | 1,351 | 49.11% | 1,362 | 49.51% | 38 | 1.38% |
| 2016 | 1,155 | 52.14% | 994 | 44.88% | 66 | 2.98% |
| 2012 | 1,100 | 53.79% | 924 | 45.18% | 21 | 1.03% |
| 2008 | 1,206 | 55.60% | 949 | 43.75% | 14 | 0.65% |
| 2004 | 1,188 | 56.20% | 912 | 43.14% | 14 | 0.66% |

As of March 2011, there were a total of 2,699 registered voters in Northvale, of which 701 (26.0% vs. 31.7% countywide) were registered as Democrats, 560 (20.7% vs. 21.1%) were registered as Republicans and 1,437 (53.2% vs. 47.1%) were registered as Unaffiliated. There was one voter registered to another party. Among the borough's 2010 Census population, 58.2% (vs. 57.1% in Bergen County) were registered to vote, including 77.7% of those ages 18 and over (vs. 73.7% countywide).

In the 2016 presidential election, Republican Donald Trump received 1,155 votes (51.3% vs. 41.6% countywide), ahead of Democrat Hillary Clinton with 994 votes (44.2% vs. 54.8%) and other candidates with 66 votes (2.9% vs. 3.0%), among the 2,250 ballots cast by the borough's 3,060 registered voters, for a turnout of 73.5% (vs. 72.5% in Bergen County). In the 2012 presidential election, Republican Mitt Romney received 1,100 votes (53.3% vs. 43.5% countywide), ahead of Democrat Barack Obama with 924 votes (44.8% vs. 54.8%) and other candidates with 21 votes (1.0% vs. 0.9%), among the 2,064 ballots cast by the borough's 2,825 registered voters, for a turnout of 73.1% (vs. 70.4% in Bergen County). In the 2008 presidential election, Republican John McCain received 1,206 votes (54.9% vs. 44.5% countywide), ahead of Democrat Barack Obama with 949 votes (43.2% vs. 53.9%) and other candidates with 14 votes (0.6% vs. 0.8%), among the 2,198 ballots cast by the borough's 2,798 registered voters, for a turnout of 78.6% (vs. 76.8% in Bergen County). In the 2004 presidential election, Republican George W. Bush received 1,188 votes (55.9% vs. 47.2% countywide), ahead of Democrat John Kerry with 912 votes (42.9% vs. 51.7%) and other candidates with 14 votes (0.7% vs. 0.7%), among the 2,125 ballots cast by the borough's 2,743 registered voters, for a turnout of 77.5% (vs. 76.9% in the whole county).

Gubernatorial election results for Northvale
| Year | Republican | | Democratic | | Third party(ies) | |
| Year | No. | % | No. | % | No. | % |
|---|---|---|---|---|---|---|
| 2025 | 1,020 | 51.52% | 957 | 48.33% | 3 | 0.15% |
| 2021 | 912 | 57.11% | 681 | 42.64% | 4 | 0.25% |
| 2017 | 563 | 47.63% | 594 | 50.25% | 25 | 2.12% |
| 2013 | 876 | 65.77% | 434 | 32.58% | 22 | 1.65% |
| 2009 | 842 | 55.18% | 606 | 39.71% | 78 | 5.11% |
| 2005 | 778 | 50.00% | 747 | 48.01% | 31 | 1.99% |

In the 2013 gubernatorial election, Republican Chris Christie received 65.8% of the vote (876 cast), ahead of Democrat Barbara Buono with 32.6% (434 votes), and other candidates with 1.7% (22 votes), among the 1,371 ballots cast by the borough's 2,739 registered voters (39 ballots were spoiled), for a turnout of 50.1%. In the 2009 gubernatorial election, Republican Chris Christie received 842 votes (54.1% vs. 45.8% countywide), ahead of Democrat Jon Corzine with 606 votes (38.9% vs. 48.0%), Independent Chris Daggett with 73 votes (4.7% vs. 4.7%) and other candidates with 5 votes (0.3% vs. 0.5%), among the 1,557 ballots cast by the borough's 2,722 registered voters, yielding a 57.2% turnout (vs. 50.0% in the county).

United States Senate election results for Northvale1
| Year | Republican | | Democratic | | Third party(ies) | |
| Year | No. | % | No. | % | No. | % |
|---|---|---|---|---|---|---|
| 2024 | 1,199 | 49.79% | 1,167 | 48.46% | 42 | 1.74% |
| 2018 | 907 | 53.29% | 736 | 43.24% | 59 | 3.47% |
| 2012 | 941 | 49.50% | 934 | 49.13% | 26 | 1.37% |
| 2006 | 858 | 54.44% | 704 | 44.67% | 14 | 0.89% |

United States Senate election results for Northvale2
| Year | Republican | | Democratic | | Third party(ies) | |
| Year | No. | % | No. | % | No. | % |
|---|---|---|---|---|---|---|
| 2020 | 1,237 | 46.19% | 1,397 | 52.17% | 44 | 1.64% |
| 2014 | 596 | 40.79% | 847 | 57.97% | 18 | 1.23% |
| 2013 | 349 | 46.41% | 400 | 53.19% | 3 | 0.40% |
| 2008 | 985 | 50.31% | 949 | 48.47% | 24 | 1.23% |

== Education ==
The Northvale Public Schools serve students in kindergarten through eighth grade at Northvale Public School. Students from Rockleigh, a non-operating school district, attend the district as part of a sending/receiving relationship. As of the 2020–21 school year, the district, comprised of one school, had an enrollment of 545 students and 48.5 classroom teachers (on an FTE basis), for a student–teacher ratio of 11.2:1. In the 2012–13 school year, Thomas Jefferson School (for grades K–4) and Nathan Hale School (for grades 5–8) were combined to create the Northvale Public School, as part of an effort to reduce costs associated with running two separate schools that shared a common campus and corridor.

Students in public school for ninth through twelfth grades attend Northern Valley Regional High School at Old Tappan, together with students from Harrington Park, Norwood and Old Tappan, along with students from Rockleigh who attend the high school as part of a sending/receiving relationship. As of the 2020–21 school year, the high school had an enrollment of 1,103 students and 94.6 classroom teachers (on an FTE basis), for a student–teacher ratio of 11.7:1. The school is one of the two schools of the Northern Valley Regional High School District, which also serves students from the neighboring communities of Closter, Demarest and Haworth at the Northern Valley Regional High School at Demarest. During the 1994–1996 school years, Northern Valley Regional High School at Old Tappan was awarded the Blue Ribbon School Award of Excellence by the United States Department of Education.

Public school students from the borough, and all of Bergen County, are eligible to attend the secondary education programs offered by the Bergen County Technical Schools, which include the Bergen County Academies in Hackensack, and the Bergen Tech campus in Teterboro or Paramus. The district offers programs on a shared-time or full-time basis, with admission based on a selective application process and tuition covered by the student's home school district.

== Transportation ==
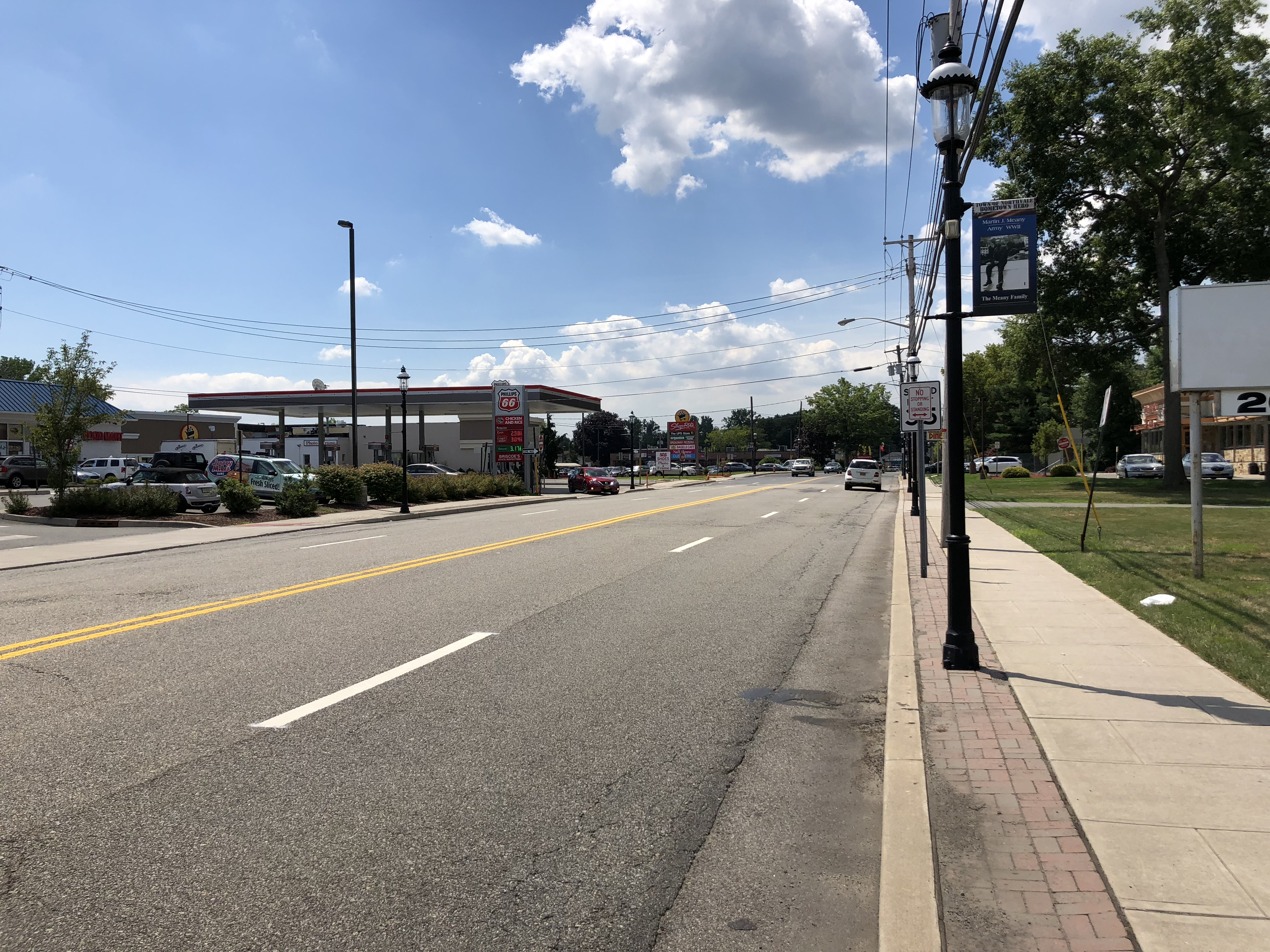
County Route 505 southbound in Northvale

=== Roads and highways ===
As of May 2010, the borough had a total of 22.67 miles (36.48 km) of roadways, of which 20.11 miles (32.36 km) were maintained by the municipality and 2.56 miles (4.12 km) by Bergen County.

County Route 505 passes through Northvale.

=== Public transportation ===
Rockland Coaches provides service on routes 20/20T to the Port Authority Bus Terminal in Midtown Manhattan.

== In popular culture ==
The television show Ed, which ran from 2000 to 2004, was filmed in Northvale. The interior and exterior shots for "Stuckeybowl" were filmed at the now closed and demolished bowling alley, formerly known as "Country Club Lanes". Housing for seniors ages 55+ now exists on the site.

In the 2008 USA Network series In Plain Sight, during the episode, Stan by Me, two FBI agents are murdered and a federally protected witness is kidnapped in Northvale.

== Notable people ==
People who were born in, residents of, or otherwise closely associated with Northvale include:

- John Calabro (1914–1994), artist and sculptor who has created coins, medals, plaques, busts, statutes and heroic-size works of famous events and notable figures from the world of politics, sports and entertainment
- L. D. Clawson (1885–1937), movie pioneer who founded the American Society of Cinematographers
- John O'Reilly (born 1995), professional baseball pitcher
- Bob Porter (1940–2021), record producer, discographer, writer, and radio presenter
- John E. Rooney (born 1939), politician who served in the New Jersey General Assembly, where he represented the 39th Legislative District, and as Mayor of Northvale
- Terese Terranova (born 1947), retired para table tennis player who won two gold medals at the 1988 Summer Paralympics
- Richard G. Zweifel (1926–2019), herpetologist, who has specialized in studying frogs

== Historic sites ==
Haring-Blauvelt House was built in 1810 and was added to the National Register of Historic Places on January 10, 1983.

== Related reading ==
- Municipal Incorporations of the State of New Jersey (according to Counties) prepared by the Division of Local Government, Department of the Treasury (New Jersey); December 1, 1958.
- Clayton, W. Woodford; and Nelson, William. History of Bergen and Passaic Counties, New Jersey, with Biographical Sketches of Many of its Pioneers and Prominent Men., Philadelphia: Everts and Peck, 1882.
- Harvey, Cornelius Burnham (ed.), Genealogical History of Hudson and Bergen Counties, New Jersey. New York: New Jersey Genealogical Publishing Co., 1900.
- Van Valen, James M. History of Bergen County, New Jersey. New York: New Jersey Publishing and Engraving Co., 1900.
- Westervelt, Frances A. (Frances Augusta), 1858–1942, History of Bergen County, New Jersey, 1630–1923, Lewis Historical Publishing Company, 1923.
