= Bob Schroeder =

American politician (born 1960)

Member of the New Jersey General Assembly from the 39th district
- In office January 12, 2010 – January 14, 2014
- Preceded by: John E. Rooney
- Succeeded by: Robert Auth

Personal details
- Born: February 16, 1960 (age 66)
- Party: Republican

Robert Schroeder (born February 16, 1960) is an American businessman and Republican Party politician who served in the New Jersey General Assembly from 2010 to 2014, where he represented the 39th Legislative District, having taken the seat of retiring incumbent John E. Rooney.

== Background ==
Schroeder was raised in Washington Township, Bergen County, New Jersey, where he was active in the local volunteer fire department starting as a teenager. He graduated from Westwood Regional High School in 1978; in 1982, he graduated from Fairleigh Dickinson University. Schroeder founded a company called All Points International Distributors, which supports international relief efforts by the United States government, the United Nations, and NATO.

== Political career ==
Since 1991, Schroeder has held public office as a Washington Township councilman. He has served as Council President twice and as Council Vice President three times. According to his legislature website, Schroeder remains active in the community, sitting on the boards of many civic organizations, and serving on the Consultative Board for Immaculate Heart Academy. He is also a Trustee for the Leo P. McGuire Public Safety and Education Foundation, a member of the New Jersey-New York Volunteer Fireman's Association, New Jersey State Fire Chief's Association, and the Bergen County 200 Club. He is past president of the Pascack Valley Police Vest Fund, and is on the advisory board of Directors for Lakeland Bank.

Schroeder spent $2.1 million on a largely self-financed campaign for Governor of New Jersey in 2005. He won the organization line in Ocean County and the endorsement of the Northeastern Republican Organization. However, he finished fifth in a field of seven candidates in the Republican primary, receiving only 5.5% of the vote, well behind victor Doug Forrester who won the race with 36% of the vote. In April 2005 Fairleigh Dickinson's PublicMind Poll found that Mr. Schroeder lacked statewide name recognition: 70% of voters reported that they hadn't heard of him. Of the voters who had heard of Schroeder, 23% responded that they had a "very favorable" or "somewhat favorable" opinion, while 16% reported that they had an "unfavorable" or "very unfavorable" opinion and 62% reported they were unsure.

In 2009, Republican Assemblyman John E. Rooney decided not to run for a fifteenth term. Schroeder and former River Edge Councilman John Felice both sought the endorsement of the Northeastern Republican Organization, which would determine who won the party line in the primary. The NERO overwhelmingly supported Schroeder over Felice, thus giving him the party line in the primary, along with incumbent Assemblywoman Charlotte Vandervalk. Felice did not run in the primary, thus securing the nomination for Schroeder.

Each of the forty districts in the New Jersey Legislature has one representative in the New Jersey Senate and two members in the New Jersey General Assembly. The other representatives from the 39th District for the 2012-2013 Legislative Session are:

- Senator Gerald Cardinale, and
- Assemblywoman Holly Schepisi

== Criminal charges and conviction ==
On August 3, 2012, Schroeder was charged by the New Jersey Attorney General's Office with passing bad checks, a second-degree felony that carries a potential prison term of up to 10 years and a $150,000 fine. The charges are related to Schroeder allegedly writing nearly $400,000 in bad checks to two investors in his distribution company, All Points International Distributors LLC, which sells tents and prefabricated buildings primarily to the U.S. military. Furthermore, creditors have filed at least six federal lawsuits against All Points, according to court records, and there are a half-dozen lawsuits against the company pending in state courts. At least three creditors, including the Internal Revenue Service, obtained judgments against Schroeder or his business totaling more than $200,000, according to court records. As reported in The Record in response to the charges, Schroeder that "I made a mistake, I apologize," and that the checks that bounced had been written under the assumption that a payment from the United States Army had been wired into his account. Schroeder said that his business had faced a drop in sales in recent years, stating that "Business has been in decline during the Obama administration."

On December 20, 2012, Schroeder was indicted by the state Attorney General on three charges, for deceiving five people who loaned him $1.9 million for a venture to provide housing for a North Dakota oil drilling project, and for writing 47 bad checks totaling $3.4 million to twelve other creditors. On October 7, 2016, soon before his trial was to begin, Schroeder entered a plea deal, pleading guilty to a charge of second-degree misconduct by a corporate official, and to a separate charge of issuing bad checks on behalf of his companies. A third charge of theft by deception was dismissed as part of the plea deal. Schroeder was required to pay back the entire $5.3 million to his victims, and he was barred from public office or public employment in New Jersey. On February 6, 2017, Schroeder was sentenced to eight years in state prison. Under his plea deal, he must serve at least three years before being eligible for parole. He was paroled in March 2020.
