= Greta Kiernan =

American politician (1933–2023)

Member of the New Jersey General Assembly from the 39th district
- In office January 10, 1978 – January 8, 1980
- Preceded by: John Markert
- Succeeded by: Gerald Cardinale; John Markert

Personal details
- Born: December 20, 1933 New York City, New York, U.S.
- Died: January 3, 2023 (aged 89)
- Party: Democratic

Greta Kiernan (née Spier, December 20, 1933 – January 3, 2023) was an American Democratic Party politician who served in the New Jersey General Assembly from the 39th Legislative District from 1978 to 1980.

Kiernan attended the Academy of the Holy Angels and Berkeley School of Business. She first worked as a lobbyist for the League of Women Voters. Prior to her elected Assembly term, she served as an aide to other Bergen County Democratic legislators Harold Martin, Matthew Feldman, and Albert Burstein. At the time a resident of Harrington Park, she ran for the General Assembly in 1977 where she and incumbent Democratic running mate Harold Martin defeated Republicans Demarest mayor Gerald Cardinale and John Inganamort among others. At the time of her election, she was the first Democratic woman elected to the legislature from Bergen County. While in the Assembly, she served on the Joint Appropriations Committee, the Legislative Oversight Committee, and the State Government Committee.

Kiernan served a single term in the General Assembly before she and Martin, were defeated by Cardinale and former Assemblyman John Markert in the 1979 elections. She later worked on the staff of State Senator Paul Contillo, U.S. Representative Rush Holt Jr., and Governors Jim McGreevey, Richard Codey, and Jon Corzine. In 1989, by now a resident of Hackensack, she ran for the General Assembly again (from the 38th District) but was defeated by Republican incumbents Patrick J. Roma and Pat Schuber. Kiernan moved to Plainsboro Township where she served on the township planning board and as a trustee of the township library.

Kiernan died on January 3, 2023, at the age of 89.
