= Joe Ferriero =

American lawyer (born 1957)

Joseph A. Ferriero

Bergen County Democratic Organization Chairman
- In office 1998 – January 22, 2009
- Preceded by: Gerald Calabrese
- Succeeded by: Michael Kasparian
- Constituency: Bergen County, New Jersey

Personal details
- Born: June 25, 1957 (age 69)
- Party: Democratic
- Education: Fordham University (B.A.); Hofstra University School of Law (J.D.)
- Occupation: Attorney

Joseph A. Ferriero (born June 25, 1957) is an American Democratic Party political leader from New Jersey and former chairman of the Bergen County Democratic Organization. Ferriero, an attorney by profession, resides in Old Tappan.

In September 2008, Ferriero and an associate, Dennis Oury, were indicted by a federal grand jury on seven counts of mail fraud and one count of conspiracy to commit mail fraud. On October 22, 2009, he was found guilty on three of the eight counts against him. On July 29, 2010, Ferriero's conviction was vacated by U.S. District Judge Stanley R. Chesler, citing a recent ruling by the United States Supreme Court narrowing the scope of honest services fraud. Judge Chesler added "what Mr. Ferriero had been charged with is not considered a crime". However, in 2013, a federal grand jury once again indicted Joe Ferriero again on charges of bribery, kickback and shakedown schemes, including a plot to extort $1.7 million from a prior developer of the New Jersey Meadowlands retail and entertainment project now known as American Dream Meadowlands.

== Personal life ==
Ferriero was born on June 25, 1957, in Holy Name Medical Center, Teaneck, New Jersey, to Joseph and Lucille Ferriero. His father was a factory worker. In 1996, Lucille died of Lou Gehrig's disease.

Ferriero has three siblings: Rosemary, Carol (deceased) and Barbara.

From the time he was three years old, young Ferriero was the mascot of Hose Company #3, where his father served as a volunteer firefighter. At the age of 16, Ferriero himself joined the Dumont Fire Patrol, eventually joining the Dumont Volunteer Fire Department after he turned 18 and worked his way up to the rank of captain.

Ferriero is the father of three children: Joseph (born c. 1992) and twins Christopher and Sophia (born c. 1995).

Ferriero is an avid runner, running the 2008 New York City Marathon in 4 hours, 30 minutes. Ferriero's eldest son, Joseph, joined Ferriero for the final ten miles.

== Education ==
After high school, Ferriero attended Fordham University in The Bronx. Ferriero graduated with a B.A. in Political Science, Economics and Public Administration. Ferriero went on to attend Hofstra University School of Law in Hempstead, New York.

Ferriero graduated from Hofstra with a Juris Doctor in 1982.

== Campaigns for state office ==
While in college, Ferriero was elected a county committeeman, representing District 6 of Dumont. At the age of 18 years, Ferriero was the youngest county committeeman in Dumont's history.

In 1977, Ferriero ran for Borough Councilman, and was the top vote getter. An incumbent Democrat Fred Lucas was defeated. He won election to the Borough Council with Richard Moloney, the incumbent who placed first in the June primary. Ferriero was the youngest elected Councilman in Dumont history.

In March 1985 at age 28 Ferriero ran as a Democrat for the State Assembly in the 39th legislative district in a special election against Elizabeth "Lisa" Randall. Ferriero was defeated by Randall.

In November 1985, Ferriero again ran unsuccessfully for the State Assembly in the 39th District.

== Career ==
Ferriero was admitted to the New Jersey Bar in 1982, and continued on with Galantucci & Patuto as an associate. Ferriero started his own law firm in 1984, building his practice to 14 employees. He would later be appointed to the bars of the United States District Court for the District of New Jersey (1982), the District of Columbia (1988), the State of New York (1994) and the United States Supreme Court (1988).

Ferriero merged his law firm with Wolf & Samson becoming a partner of that firm. He left Wolf & Sampson in 2002. Ferriero's portfolio included complex personal injury litigation, medical malpractice litigation, professional negligence, municipal administrative law, commercial litigation, land use/zoning law, and employment and environmental law.

Ferriero is a member of the New Jersey State Bar Association, American Trial Lawyers Association, and the American Bar Association. He has also been appointed to serve as a mediator and arbitrator for the American Arbitration Association.

== Bergen County Democratic Chairman ==
As Bergen County Democratic Chairman, Ferriero is credited with revitalizing a political party that had not won a county wide election in over 14 years. Prior to Ferriero's leadership the Republican Party had complete control of County Government. Within only a few years Ferriero led the Democratic Party to control of County Government and is credited with being the architect that led to the first Democrat being elected County Executive. Under his leadership the Democratic Party took complete control of every county office. Ferriero's progressive leadership led to the most diverse freeholder board and county administration. He created the Bergen County African American Democratic Conference to encourage diversity in the party, and was instrumental in electing one of the first African-American legislators in Bergen County. He was also an early supporter of Vernon Walton, the county's first ever African-American freeholder. In addition, Ferriero created the Latin American Democratic organization and worked to elect the first Hispanic freeholder. Ferriero also played a major role in the election of Democratic Governors James McGreevey and Jon Corzine. He was considered one of the most influential democratic leaders in the state who was known for his exceptional fundraising ability for federal, state and local political campaigns.

Critics have noted that Ferriero's position as County Chairman gave him extensive power to select hundreds of employees in county government and to award no-bid contracts, many of whom have been involved in pay to play, receiving contracts in exchange for contributions.

Ferriero has had a long-running feud with State Senator Loretta Weinberg, who has stood steadfastly independent from Ferriero's organization. In 2007, Ferriero endorsed a ticket of Englewood Mayor Michael Wildes for Senate, and Cid Wilson and Ken Zisa for Assembly, to face off in a primary challenge against incumbents Weinberg, and her Assembly running mates Valerie Huttle and Gordon M. Johnson. In the face of flagging poll figures for his slate, an April 2007 deal was brokered by Governor of New Jersey Jon Corzine, in which Ferriero pulled his three candidates off the ballot and agreed that he and the county party organization would support Weinberg and her running mates.

He also championed the Latin American Democratic Association (LADA) to encourage Hispanic participation in the Bergen County Democratic Party. LADA and Ferriero were influential in later electing Tomas J. Padilla as freeholder and supporting him for Freeholder Director. Padilla was the first Hispanic to serve as Freeholder Director in the county's history.

== 2008 corruption trial ==
In September 2008, Ferriero and Dennis J. Oury were indicted by a federal grand jury on charges of mail fraud and conspiracy to commit mail fraud. The indictment alleged that Ferriero and Oury had concealed ownership of a grant-writing business that did business with Bergenfield, one of several municipalities that had Oury on the payroll as municipal attorney; that they had used their political clout to steer $1.4 million in grants to that borough, then collected fees from their company; and that they had used the United States mail to execute this scheme to defraud Bergenfield of money, property, and Oury's honest services. Ferriero pleaded not guilty. He was eventually convicted on two counts of mail fraud and one count of conspiracy under the honest services theory of fraud; he was not found guilty of defrauding Bergenfield of money or property.

=== Crimes ===
Ferriero's indictment was dismissed in July 2010 by U.S. District Court Judge Stanley Chesler.

=== Trial ===
Dennis Oury, Ferriero's co-defendant, plea bargained with the prosecution prior to the trial; on September 29, 2009, he pleaded guilty to one count of conspiracy and a reduced charge of failing to file a tax return. Oury was called as a witness by the prosecution on October 6 and completed his testimony on October 7.

The trial began on October 1, 2009. Prosecutors opened by explaining the allegations against Ferriero to the jury, also informing them that Oury had pleaded guilty two days beforehand. Joseph Hayden, an attorney defending Ferriero, argued in his opening statement that unlike Oury, Ferriero was a private citizen who had a right to have created a legitimate grant-writing company and solicited on behalf of that company. He also noted that Ferriero had paid taxes on his income from GGC where Oury had not in an attempt to further conceal his conflict of interest. The prosecution called numerous witnesses to the stand, including former Bergenfield Mayor Robert Rivas, former Bergenfield councilmen, other individuals involved in GGC, and Dennis Oury himself.

Ferriero testified in his own defense on October 14–15. While on the witness stand, Ferriero stated that he had been under "absolutely no obligation" to reveal his ownership of GGC, and that he had "had the absolute right to reach out on behalf of the company." Ferriero also testified that he had believed that Oury was going to recuse himself from Bergenfield government matters regarding GGC, and that he had not been aware that Oury was offering legal advice to or doing legal work for Bergenfield in matters involving GGC. In their cross-examination of Ferriero, prosecutors pressed Ferriero for using his influence to secure the passage of the relevant grants, and for not directly asking Oury whether he had recused himself. Ferriero admitted that he had used his influence to facilitate the grants' passage, but insisted that doing so was "not a bad thing." Ferriero also admitted that he had never asked Oury whether he had recused himself, asserting that he did not think to do so because it was "so basic in the law." In his closing statement, Hayden asserted that the only individual whose conduct was improper was Oury, and that Ferriero had lacked an intent to defraud; he also asserted that, regarding the honest services fraud charge, the prosecution had failed to prove that Ferriero knew that his actions were resulting in Oury serving Bergenfield dishonestly.

=== Conviction ===
On October 22, 2009, Ferriero was found guilty on one count of conspiracy to defraud and two counts of mail fraud. He was acquitted on five other counts of mail fraud.

As a result of a decision by the United States Supreme Court, Ferriero was cleared of all charges against him. The law was deemed too vague and it was misused by over zealous prosecutors. On July 29, 2010, U.S. District Court Judge Stanley R. Chesler vacated all charges against Ferriero. "The court's ruling has now cleared Mr. Ferriero of all charges in the indictment returned against him two years ago".

== 2013 bribery trial ==
In September 2013, Ferriero was indicted by a federal grand jury on charges of bribery, kickback and shakedown schemes.

=== Trial ===
He was convicted and given three years. His appeal was denied in 2017.
