= Herbert M. Gladstone =

American politician (1915–2010)

Member of the New Jersey General Assembly from the 39th district
- In office January 8, 1974 – January 13, 1976
- Preceded by: District created
- Succeeded by: John Markert

Personal details
- Born: August 31, 1915 New York, New York, U.S.
- Died: January 12, 2010 (aged 94)
- Party: Democratic
- Spouse: Irma Jean
- Children: 3
- Education: New York University; University of Mississippi; University of Washington; Brooklyn College

Herbert M. Gladstone (August 31, 1915 – January 12, 2010) was an American Democratic Party politician who served on the township council of River Vale, New Jersey, and one term in the New Jersey General Assembly.

== Biography ==
Gladstone was born in New York City in 1915. He attended New York University, University of Mississippi, University of Washington, and Brooklyn College. Gladstone was a member of the Bergen County Democratic committee for 15 years. In 1958, he became the first Democrat to sit on the River Vale township council; he served there until 1958. He also served on various local boards and committees. Gladstone was married to Imra Jean and had three children.

In 1973, Gladstone was elected to the New Jersey General Assembly from the newly created, northern Bergen County-based 39th district alongside fellow Democrat Harold Martin. One of his opponents in the election was incumbent Republican Robert C. Veit. During his one term in the Assembly, he cast one of the final yes votes to create a state income tax in 1974. Gladstone decided to retire in 1975 after one term.

Gladstone later moved to Royal Palm Beach, Florida, where he twice ran unsuccessfully for mayor. He died there on January 12, 2012, at the age of 94.
