= Academy of the Holy Angels =

Catholic high school in Bergen County, New Jersey, US

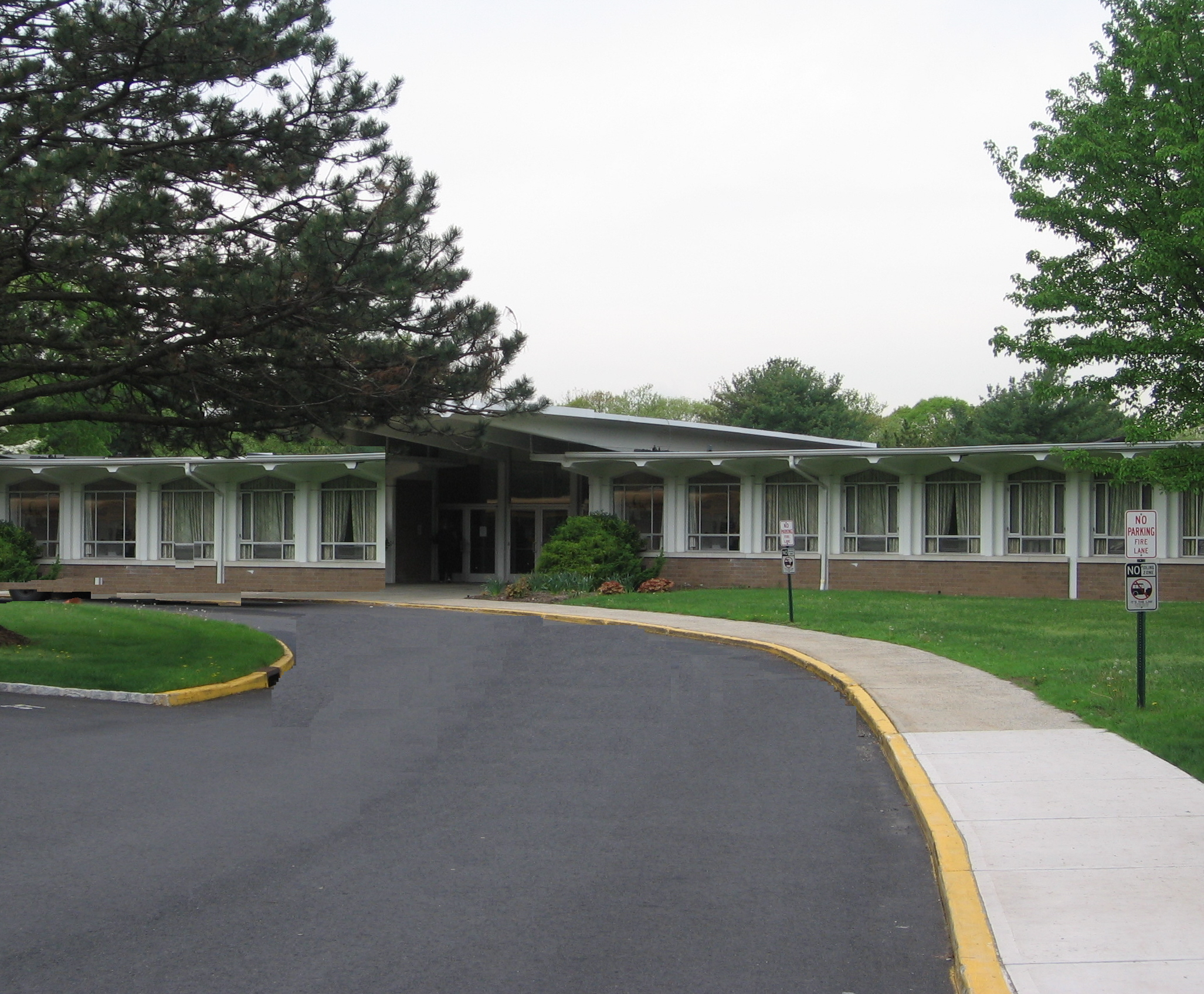

Location
- 315 Hillside Avenue; Demarest, Bergen County, New Jersey 07627; United States; 40°56′34″N 73°56′42″W

Information
- Type: Private, all-female, middle school and high school
- Motto: Vitae Via Virtus ("Let virtue be your way of life")
- Religious affiliation: Roman Catholic
- Established: 1879
- Founder: Sister Mary Nonna Dunphy, SSND
- Oversight: School Sisters of Notre Dame
- CEEB code: 310-390
- NCES School ID: 00864242
- President: Melinda A. Hanlon
- Principal: Jean Miller
- Faculty: 63.4 FTEs
- Grades: 6–12
- Enrollment: 519 (as of 2023–24)
- Average class size: 19
- Student to teacher ratio: 8.2:1
- Campus size: 25 acres (100,000 m^{2})
- Campus type: Suburban
- Colors: Royal Blue and white
- Song: AHA Alma Mater
- Athletics conference: Big North Conference
- Team name: Angels
- Rival: Immaculate Heart Academy, Paramus Catholic High School
- Accreditation: Middle States Association of Colleges and Schools
- Publication: Blueprint (literary magazine); AHA International (international events newsletter)
- Newspaper: The AHA Voice
- Yearbook: Echoes
- Tuition: $23,950 (2025–26)
- Affiliation: School Sisters of Notre Dame
- Dean of Students: Andrea Beyer
- Admissions Director: Stephanie Dowling
- Athletic Director: Lisa Musico
- Website: www.holyangels.org

The Academy of the Holy Angels is an all-female private middle school and college preparatory high school located in Demarest, in Bergen County, in the U.S. state of New Jersey, serving students in sixth through twelfth grade. The school is a sponsored work of the School Sisters of Notre Dame. The Academy of the Holy Angels draws students from North Jersey, Rockland County, New York, and surrounding areas.

As of the 2023–24 school year, the school had an enrollment of 519 students and 63.4 classroom teachers (on an FTE basis), for a student–teacher ratio of 8.2:1. The school's student body was 52.4% (272) White, 23.7% (123) Asian, 11.4% (59) Hispanic, 7.9% (41) two or more races, 4.0% (21) Black, 0.2% (1) American Indian / Alaska Native and 0.4% (2) Native Hawaiian / Pacific Islander.

The Academy of the Holy Angels is a member of the National Catholic Educational Association and the New Jersey Association of Independent Schools.

== History ==
The Academy of the Holy Angels is the oldest private school in Bergen County. Founded in 1879 by Sister Mary Nonna Dunphy, one of the School Sisters of Notre Dame, the school was opened in Fort Lee, New Jersey as a boarding and day school for girls from kindergarten to twelfth grade. In 1890 it was incorporated as Holy Angels, Collegiate Institute for Young Ladies and Preparatory School for Little Girls. Its motto was then and remains now "Vitae Via Virtus." The Holy Angels Board voted to change the name of the school to the Academy of the Holy Angels in 1934 when Sister M. Angeline Hughes was Principal. The school accepted a developer's offer for the school's location in Fort Lee and purchased a large property in Demarest. The school had operated a grammar school in addition to the high school for decades and many graduates were known as "12 year Angels." The grammar school was discontinued completely in 1964 prior to the move from Fort Lee. Building commenced and the school relocated to its current location in Demarest in 1965. The former site was replaced by Mediterranean Towers South at 2000 Linwood Avenue, on the northeast corner of Main Street and Linwood Avenue.

== Awards and recognition ==
During the 1999–2000 school year, the Academy of the Holy Angels was awarded the Blue Ribbon School Award of Excellence by the United States Department of Education, the highest award an American school can receive.

The Corporation for National Service selected the Academy of the Holy Angels as a National Service-Learning Leader School, due to its excellence in service learning. Holy Angels is one of two Catholic high schools nationwide to receive this honor.

=== Middle States accreditation ===
The school is accredited by the Middle States Association of Colleges and Schools Commission on Elementary and Secondary Schools. AHA chose Accreditation for Growth, a strategic planning method in which diverse constituent groups participate in discussions, which are then used as a method for growth and improvement, both academically by the students, as well as by the institution.

== Technology ==
Since 2005, upon entering the school, each student is required to buy a Fujitsu Tablet. Students use these tablets during school and at home to complete assignments, access the internet for research, take notes, and communicate with the faculty. Equipped with a pen and with a screen that can function as a notebook, students are able to use these tablets for all subjects such as History and Math. Features such as the Dropbox and Student Commons allow students to access notes and papers from the teachers on the school network, as well as place their own completed assignments within the folders on the network and, in effect, decrease the amount of paper used.

In addition, AHA is currently using Turnitin, a website that scans finished papers and assignments for plagiarism and helps prevent it as well. Beginning with the class of 2011, AHA began to use LiveText, an online storage site in which each student is able to upload their best papers and projects, ultimately creating their own 'online resume.'

== Art ==
AHA facilities include four art studios and a lab for digital media. Winter and Spring Art Shows are held annually to feature artists. The school also has an active chapter of the National Art Honor Society, Art Club, and Photography Club.

The AHA Dance Team competes annually at the UDA National Dance Team Championship, hosted at the ESPN Wide World of Sports in Orlando, FL. The squad has won five National Titles in Small Varsity Hip Hop as well as placed in the top 3 in Small Varsity Pom for the past three years.

== Activities ==
The Academy of the Holy Angels provides a range of clubs and organizations that students can join based on their own interests and availability. In addition to after-school activities, the schedule of AHA allows a 45-minute activity period at the end of the day once a cycle, during which students can participate in in-school clubs and organizations. There are two cycles that alternate, and students can, therefore, choose two in-school activities to participate in.

=== In-school activities ===
- AHAnime
- Armenian Club
- Art for the Community
- Asian Cultural Society
- Black and Hispanic Cultural Society
- Blueprint Literary Magazine
- Book Club
- Comic Book Heroes on Film
- CSI Angels
- Deep Relaxation
- Diversity Club
- Drama Club
- Echoes Yearbook
- Embroidery Club
- French Club
- French for Travelers
- Go Green
- History Society
- I'm Puzzled
- Instrumental Ensemble/Orchestra
- International Students Club
- Italian Club
- Japanese Club
- Latin Dancing
- Lean In
- Literature on Film
- Math Club/3D Design
- Math Tutoring
- M.E.D.S.
- Music Makers
- Outreach
- Pen Pals
- Project Greenhouse
- Quillow 101
- Quick and Easy Crafts
- Real Life 101
- Roman Personalities on Film
- SADD
- Scrabble, Checkers, Chess
- Spanish Club
- Student Athletic Association
- Student Council
- Study Period
- Ultimate Frisbee
- Yoga
- Young Entrepreneur

=== After-school activities ===
- Academy Chorus
- Advisory Council
- AHA Dance Team
- AHA Voice (newspaper)
- AHAnime
- Angel Ambassadors
- Angels for Animals
- Angels For Life
- Angels over Africa
- Art Club
- Asian Cultural Society
- Big/Little Sister
- Black & Hispanic Cultural Association
- Blueprint Literary Magazine
- Book Club
- Bridges
- Chess
- CSI Angels (Forensics)
- Dean's Council
- Debate
- Drama Club
- Drawing from Model
- Echoes (yearbook)
- Embroidery
- E-portfolio
- Equality Now
- Equestrian
- Eucharistic Ministers
- French Club
- Gaelic Society
- GO Green
- Habitat for Humanity
- Handbell
- Hellenic Angels
- Honduras Club
- Instrumental Ensemble
- Italian Club
- Jazz Band
- Jeweled Angels
- JOY (Joining Old & Young)
- Just Angels
- Knitwits
- Korean Club
- Liturgical Ministers
- Math Club
- MEDS
- Middle Eastern Club
- Mock Trial
- Model UN
- Music Makers
- Operation Smile
- Orchestra
- Outreach
- Photography
- Quidditch
- Quiz Bowl
- Retreat Leadership Teams
- SADD
- Service Organizations
- ScoliAngels
- Space Angels
- Spanish Club
- Stress Busters
- Student Athletic Association
- Student Council
- Theater Productions
- Vocal Ensemble
- Walking for Fitness
- Watercolor Painting
- Writers' Club

== Honors Societies ==
- National Honor Society
- Mu Alpha Theta (National Mathematics Honor Society)
- Thespian Honor Society (Performing Arts)
- National Science Honor Society
- Società Onoraria Italica (Italian Language)
- Societas Latina Honoris (Latin Language)
- Société Honoraire de Français (French Language)
- Sociedad Honoraria Hispánica (Spanish Language)
- Tri-M Honor Society (Music)
- Rho Kappa (National Social Studies Honor Society)
- NBEA (National Business Honor Society)
- National Art Honor Society

== Athletics ==
The Angels of the Academy of the Holy Angels compete in the Big North Conference, which is comprised of public and private high schools in Bergen and Passaic counties, and was established following a reorganization of sports leagues in Northern New Jersey by the New Jersey State Interscholastic Athletic Association. Prior to realignment in 2010, the school competed in the North Bergen Interscholastic Athletic League, which consisted of public and private high schools located in Bergen County. With 866 students in grades 10–12, the school was classified by the NJSIAA for the 2019–20 school year as Non-Public A for most athletic competition purposes, which included schools with an enrollment of 381 to 1,454 students in that grade range (equivalent to Group I for public schools).

The Academy of the Holy Angels has a long-standing rivalry with fellow Catholic school, Immaculate Heart Academy in Washington Township. In 2018, the varsity soccer team beat the Eagles 1-0 for the first time in history.

The cross country team won the Non-Public A state titles in both 2006 and 2009.

Basketball coach Susan Liddy was recognized in fall 2008 for having reached a milestone 600th win.

The tennis team won the Non-Public A state championship in 2015 (defeating Eustace Preparatory School in the final match of the tournament) and in 2018 (vs. Pingry School). The 2015 team ran their record for the season to 16–0 after winning the Non-Public A state title over Bishop Eustace 4–1 in the tournament finals at Mercer County Park.

The bowling team won the Group II state championship in 2015.

Sports offered to students at AHA include:

Fall sports

- Cross country running
- Gymnastics
- Soccer
- Tennis
- Volleyball
- Bergen Catholic Varsity Cheer
- St. Joseph's Varsity Cheer

Winter sports

- Basketball
- Bowling
- Fencing
- Indoor track

Spring sports

- Golf
- Lacrosse
- Softball
- Track and field

== Alma mater ==
The official alma mater for Holy Angels was written by Margaret Mary Powers Gidez (Class of 1942). The original lyrics of the first two lines were, "With stately dome arising high and golden cross above." When the Academy relocated to Demarest in 1965, the lyrics were changed to reflect the move.

== Notable alumnae ==
- Greta Kiernan (born 1933), politician who served in the New Jersey General Assembly from the 39th Legislative District from 1978 to 1980.
- Nita Naldi (1894–1961), stage performer and silent film actress
- Susie Wiles (born 1957, class of 1975), political consultant who was selected by Donald Trump to serve as the 32nd White House chief of staff in his second administration

== Notable faculty ==
- Herb Cohen (born 1940), fencing coach, two-time Olympian

== In popular culture ==
In the 1947 noir film Kiss of Death the Academy, then located in Fort Lee, was the setting of an orphanage where main character Nick Bianco (played by Victor Mature) visits his daughters. The film was directed by Henry Hathaway and the nun in the orphanage was portrayed by Eva Condon.
