= Elizabeth Randall =

American politician (born 1954)

Member of the Bergen County Board of Chosen Freeholders
- In office 2003–2007

Commissioner of the New Jersey Department of Banking and Insurance
- In office June 28, 1996 – August 24, 1998
- Appointed by: Christine Todd Whitman
- Succeeded by: Jaynee LaVecchia

Member of the New Jersey General Assembly from the 39th district
- In office April 5, 1985 – January 31, 1991 Serving with John E. Rooney
- Preceded by: John Markert
- Succeeded by: Charlotte Vandervalk

Personal details
- Born: 1954 (age 71–72) Teaneck, New Jersey, U.S.
- Education: Smith College; Wake Forest University School of Law

Elizabeth Randall (born 1954), is an American Republican Party politician who served as a Commissioner of the New Jersey Board of Public Utilities and served on the Bergen County Board of Chosen Freeholders from 2003 to 2007. She previously served as county counsel under the administration of former Bergen County Executive William "Pat" Schuber, where she oversaw efforts including the downsizing of county government and the preservation of thousands of acres of open space. Prior to serving in county government, Randall was elected to the New Jersey General Assembly in 1985 and served there until 1992, representing the 39th Legislative District.

== Early life and education ==
Born in 1954 in Teaneck, New Jersey, Randall is the daughter of Harry Randall Jr., who served as a Freeholder and as an Assemblyman from 1962 to 1966 and from 1968 to 1970. Raised in Westwood, New Jersey, Randall graduated from Westwood Regional High School in 1971, Smith College in 1975 and from Wake Forest University School of Law in 1978.

== Career ==
A resident of Westwood, New Jersey, she was appointed New Jersey Commissioner of Banking and Insurance under Governor Christine Todd Whitman. Prior to that, she served as assistant counsel in the office of Governor Thomas Kean. She also served as vice president of the New Jersey Sports and Exposition Authority, which manages the Meadowlands Sports Complex.

Randall was an adjunct professor of public policy at Ramapo College and sat as a member of the Rutgers Finance Advisory Board. She formerly worked as an attorney in the Westwood law firm of Randall, Randall and Stevens. Randall served on the Columbia Bank Board of Directors, and is the first woman to serve in this capacity in the history of the bank. She is a member of the Board of the Westwood Senior House and president of the Riley Senior Center, a senior activity center in Westwood.

She worked to improve budgeting to the county, reduce the county debt, and make Bergen County a leader in campaign finance reform. She worked for protections against so-called "Pay to Play" in Bergen County.

One of her first acts as Freeholder was to introduce an amendment to the county’s ethics code forcing full disclosure of campaign contributions given by vendors to officeholders, political parties and political action committees. She has worked to keep the Continental Airlines Arena open, help assure feasible transportation, and to protect Bergen County from overdevelopment.

Randall was defeated for reelection in the 2006 Republican primary for freeholder. Randall had accepted the county party's endorsement to run for reelection on a ticket headed by former Freeholder Todd Caliguire for county executive. After moderate County Clerk Kathleen Donovan entered the race against the conservative Caliguire, Randall, together with county surrogate candidate, Jae Y. Kim, switched to Donovan's ticket. Randall was defeated in the primary by Caliguire's running mates.

On February 26, 2008, Randall was nominated by Governor of New Jersey Jon Corzine to serve on the New Jersey Board of Public Utilities.
