= John V. Azzariti =

American politician from New Jersey

John V. Azzariti Jr

Member of the New Jersey General Assembly from the 39th district
- Incumbent
- Assumed office January 9, 2024 Serving with Robert Auth
- Preceded by: DeAnne DeFuccio

Personal details
- Born: February 1, 1966 (age 60)
- Party: Republican
- Education: Case Western Reserve University; University of Medicine and Dentistry of New Jersey - New Jersey Medical School
- Website: Legislative webpage

John V. Azzariti Jr. (born February 1, 1966) is an American physician and Republican Party politician serving as a member of the New Jersey General Assembly for the 39th legislative district, having taken office on January 9, 2024.

== Biography ==
A resident of Saddle River, New Jersey, Azzariti earned his undergraduate degree at Case Western Reserve University and received his medical degree at the University of Medicine and Dentistry of New Jersey - New Jersey Medical School. He completed a residency in Anesthesiology at New York University Medical Center. He is employed as a physician anesthesiologist.

== Elective office ==
Azzariti served on the Saddle River borough council from 2019 to 2023 after having served on the borough's board of health from 2009 to 2018 and on the zoning board of adjustment in 2018.

In 2021, after Holly Schepisi announced that she would leave her Assembly seat to run for the Senate seat that became vacant following the death of Gerald Cardinale, Azzariti ran to fill the second Assembly seat with Schepisi's support, but the Republicans chose DeAnne DeFuccio. After DeFuccio announced in 2023 that she would not run for re-election for a second term, Azzariti again received Schepisi's support and won the Republican convention for the second Assembly seat with incumbent Robert Auth. Auth and Azzariti defeated Democrats Damon J. Englese and John F. Vitale in the 2023 New Jersey General Assembly election. Azzariti was one of 27 members elected for the first time in 2023 to serve in the General Assembly, more than one-third of the seats.

== Electoral history ==
39th Legislative District General Election, 2025
Party	Candidate	Votes	%
Republican	Robert Auth (incumbent)	50,382	25.9
Republican	John V. Azzariti (incumbent)	49,650	25.6
Democratic	Andrew LaBruno	47,214	24.3
Democratic	Donna Abene	46,991	24.2
Total votes		156,732	100.0
Republican hold			
Republican hold			

39th Legislative District General Election, 2023
Party	Candidate	Votes	%
Republican	Robert Auth (incumbent)	33,061	27.0
Republican	John V. Azzariti	32,340	26.4
Democratic	John Vitale	29,046	23.7
Democratic	Damon Englese	28,183	23.0
Total votes		122,630	100.0
Republican hold			
Republican hold			
