= John O'Reilly (baseball) =

American baseball player (born 1995)

Free agent
- Pitcher
- Born: October 4, 1995 (age 30); Northvale, New Jersey, U.S.
- Bats: Right Throws: Right

John O'Reilly (born October 4, 1995) is an American professional baseball pitcher who is a free agent.

== Amateur career ==
Raised in Northvale, New Jersey, O'Reilly played prep baseball at Northern Valley Regional High School at Old Tappan. O'Reilly played college baseball at Rutgers from 2015 to 2018. In 2016, he played collegiate summer baseball with the Orleans Firebirds of the Cape Cod Baseball League.

== Professional career ==
=== Pittsburgh Pirates ===
On June 27, 2018, O'Reilly signed with the Pittsburgh Pirates as an undrafted free agent. He split his first professional season between the rookie-level Gulf Coast League Pirates and Bristol Pirates. O'Reilly split the 2019 campaign between the Single-A Greensboro Grasshoppers, High-A Bradenton Marauders, and Double-A Altoona Curve. In 30 relief appearances for the three affiliates, he accumulated a 1.46 ERA with 31 strikeouts and 5 saves across 49 1/3 innings pitched.

O'Reilly did not play in a game in 2020 due to the cancellation of the minor league season because of the COVID-19 pandemic. He returned to action in 2021 with Altoona and the Triple-A Indianapolis Indians. In 38 total appearances, O'Reilly logged a 3–5 record and 5.85 ERA with 35 strikeouts across 67 2/3 innings pitched.

O'Reilly spent the 2022 and 2023 seasons back with Indianapolis. He posted a 5–3 record and 5.84 ERA with 29 strikeouts over 41 games in 2022, and registered a 3–8 record and 5.74 ERA with 55 strikeouts across 50 contests in 2023. O'Reilly was released by the Pirates organization on September 28, 2023.

=== Los Angeles Angels ===
On March 25, 2024, O'Reilly signed with the Irish Wolfhounds Baseball Club, a barnstorming team made up of Irish-American players who either have or qualify for Irish citizenship. However, O'Reilly signed a minor league contract Los Angeles Angels organization April 16. In 27 games (12 starts) split between the Double-A Rocket City Trash Pandas and Triple-A Salt Lake Bees, he accumulated a 4.65 ERA with 69 strikeouts across 79 1/3 innings pitched. O'Reilly elected free agency following the season on November 4.
