= Haring–Blauvelt House =

Historic house in New Jersey, United States

- U.S. National Register of Historic Places
- New Jersey Register of Historic Places
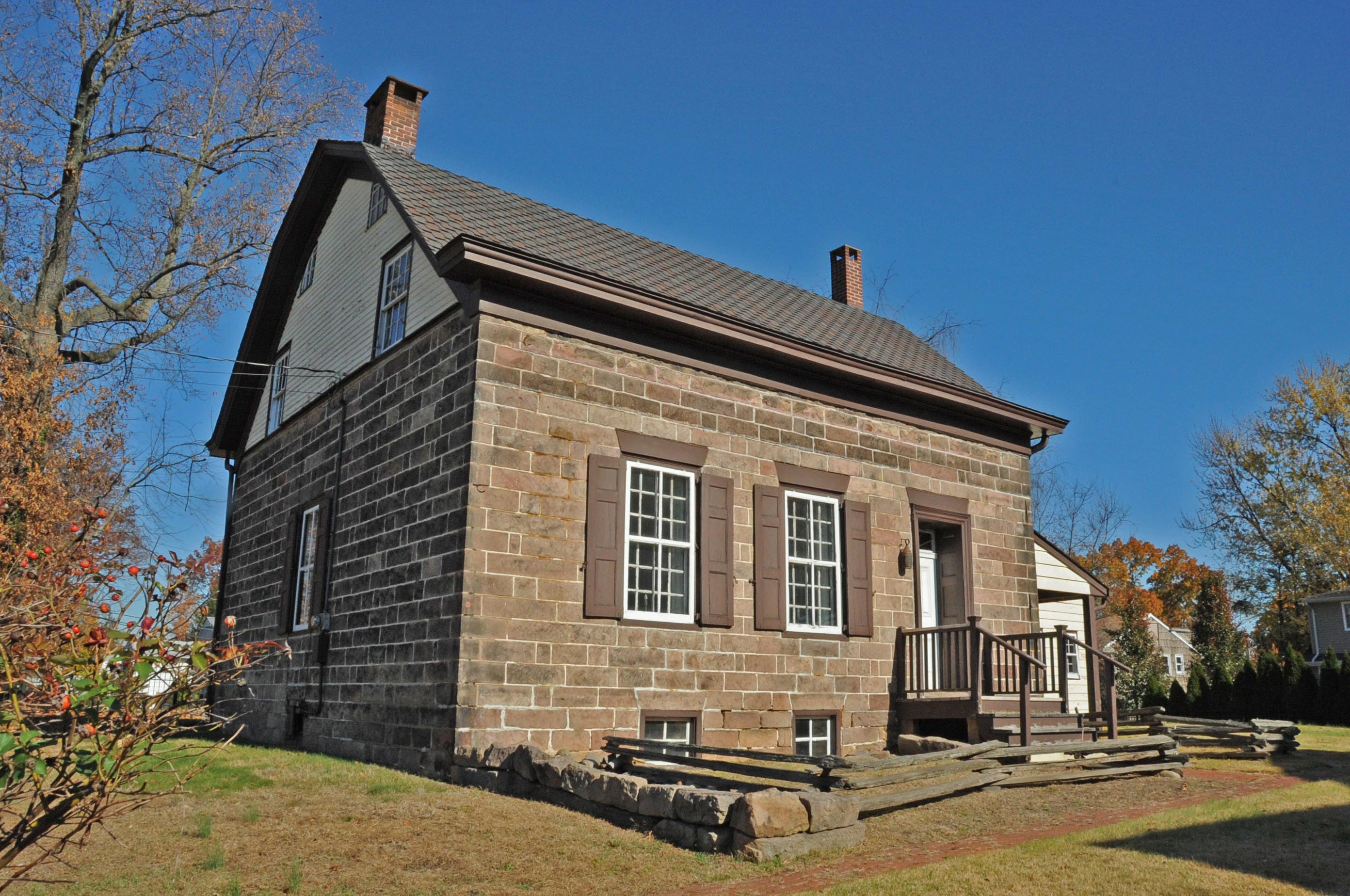

- Location within Bergen County, New Jersey Location within New Jersey Location within the United States
- Location: 454 Tappan Road, Northvale, New Jersey
- Coordinates: 41°0′47″N 73°57′7″W
- Built: c. 1810
- MPS: Stone Houses of Bergen County TR
- NRHP reference No.: 83001511
- NJRHP No.: 589

Significant dates
- Added to NRHP: January 10, 1983
- Designated NJRHP: October 3, 1980

The Haring–Blauvelt House is located at 454 Tappan Road in the borough of Northvale in Bergen County, New Jersey, United States. The historic stone house was built around 1810 based on architectural evidence and was added to the National Register of Historic Places on January 10, 1983, for its significance in architecture. It was listed as part of the Early Stone Houses of Bergen County Multiple Property Submission (MPS).

The land was owned by the Haring family. In 1809, Catharine Haring married John J. Blauvelt, who likely built the house, according to the nomination form. One side of the house is frame, the rest is rough cut sandstone.

== See also ==
- National Register of Historic Places listings in Bergen County, New Jersey
