= Robert Auth =

Member of the New Jersey General Assembly

Robert J. Auth
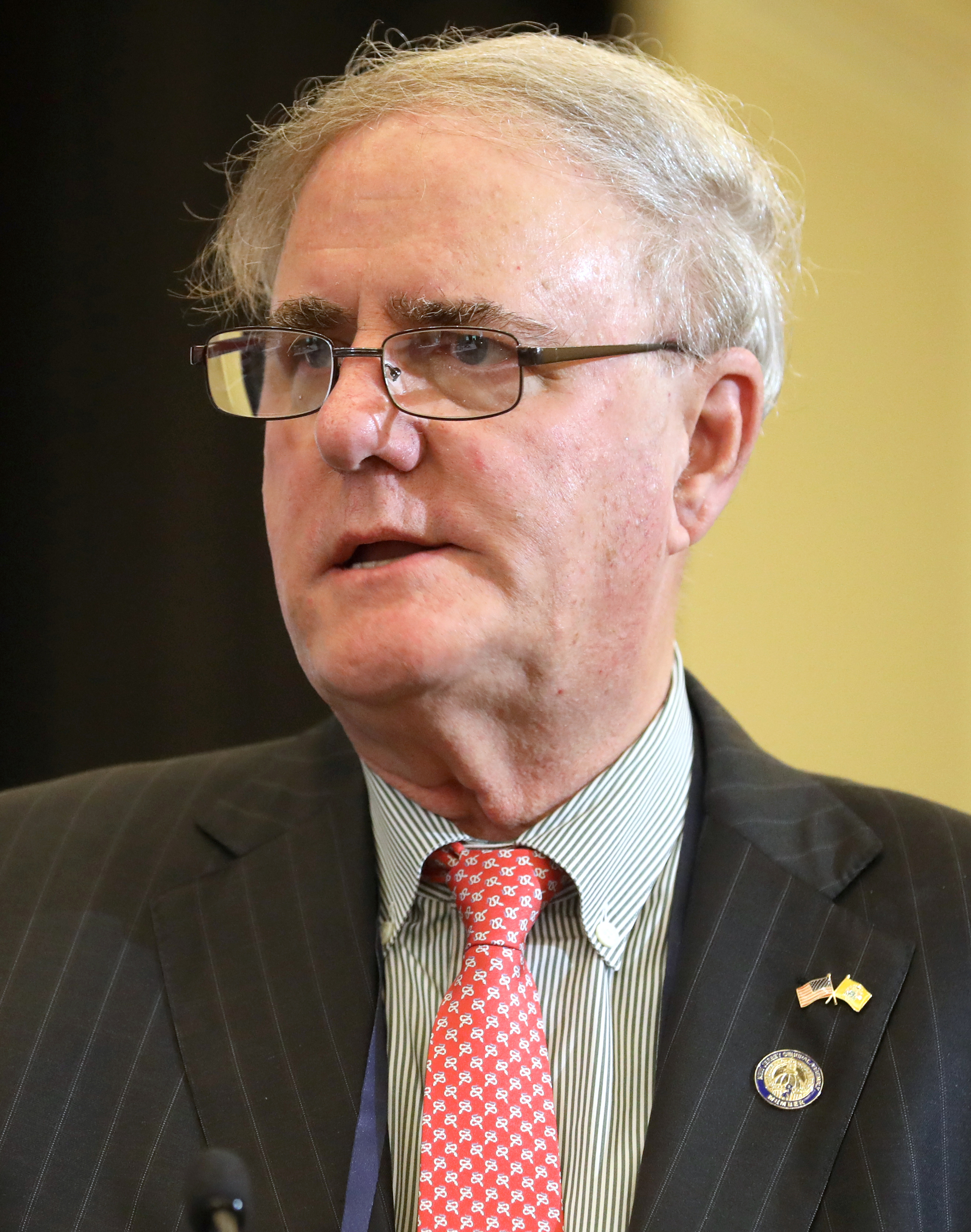
- Auth in 2023

Member of the New Jersey General Assembly from the 39th district
- Incumbent
- Assumed office January 14, 2014 Serving with John Azzariti
- Preceded by: Bob Schroeder

Personal details
- Born: July 4, 1956 (age 70) New York, New York, U.S.
- Party: Republican
- Children: 1
- Education: New York University (BA)
- Occupation: Insurance broker
- Website: Legislative webpage

Robert Joseph Auth (born July 4, 1956) is an American politician from New Jersey who represents the 39th Legislative District in the New Jersey General Assembly since taking office on January 14, 2014.

== Education ==
Auth earned his B.A. from New York University, where he studied History and Philosophy.

== Career ==
Replacing Bob Schroeder who did not run for re-election, Auth ran successfully in the 2013 general election. He was a delegate to the Republican National Committee in 2016. In the Assembly, he currently serves on the Financial Institutions and Insurance Committee, the Commerce and Economic Development Committee, and the Judiciary Committee

Auth is the Chief Executive Officer at Plaza Travel and Insurance Services Ltd., a company he founded in 1985. He previously served as an aide to Gerald Cardinale, advising on insurance and economic matters, and was a teacher for the North Bergen School District from 2004 to 2006. Auth also worked as an agency manager at the North Bergen office of the Motor Vehicle Commission.

Auth endorsed Donald Trump for President of the United States in 2016, the first legislator from New Jersey to do so. Auth was also invited to attend Trump's inauguration.

=== Committees ===
Committee assignments for the 2026—27 legislative session are:

- Appropriations
- Financial Institutions and Insurance
- Judiciary

=== District 39 ===
Each of the 40 districts in the New Jersey Legislature has one representative in the New Jersey Senate and two members in the New Jersey General Assembly. The representatives from the 39th District for the 2026—27 legislative session are:

- Senator Holly Schepisi (R)
- Assemblyman Robert Auth (R)
- Assemblywoman John V. Azzariti (R)

== Electoral history ==
39th Legislative District General Election, 2023
Party	Candidate	Votes	%
Republican	Robert Auth (incumbent)	33,061	27.0
Republican	John V. Azzariti	32,340	26.4
Democratic	John Vitale	29,046	23.7
Democratic	Damon Englese	28,183	23.0
Total votes		122,630	100.0
Republican hold			
Republican hold			

39th legislative district general election, 2021
Party	Candidate	Votes	%
Republican	Robert Auth (incumbent)	44,343	28.29%
Republican	DeAnne DeFuccio (incumbent)	43,791	27.94%
Democratic	Melinda J. Iannuzzi	34,890	22.26%
Democratic	Karlito A. Almeda	33,708	21.51%
Total votes		156,732	100.0
Republican hold			

39th Legislative District General Election, 2019
Party	Candidate	Votes	%
Republican	Holly Schepisi (incumbent)	27,125	28.54%
Republican	Robert Auth (incumbent)	25,494	26.82%
Democratic	John Birkner	21,434	22.55%
Democratic	Gerald Falotico	20,989	22.08%
Total votes		95,042	100%
Republican hold			

== Personal life ==
Auth has been a pilot since 1982. He and his wife Elsa have one grown son. Auth is a resident of Old Tappan, where he is the Republican Party municipal chairman.

New Jersey General Assembly
Preceded by Bob Schroeder	Member of the New Jersey General Assembly for the 39th District; January 14, 2014 – present With: Holly Schepisi	Succeeded by Incumbent
