= John Markert (politician) =

American politician (1929–2011)

Member of the New Jersey General Assembly from the 39th district
- In office January 8, 1980 – January 14, 1986
- Preceded by: Greta Kiernan; Harold Martin
- Succeeded by: Elizabeth Randall
- In office January 13, 1976 – January 10, 1978
- Preceded by: Herbert M. Gladstone
- Succeeded by: Greta Kiernan

Personal details
- Born: November 23, 1929 Union City, New Jersey
- Died: June 2, 2011 (aged 81) Hobe Sound, Florida
- Party: Republican

John Markert (November 23, 1929 – June 2, 2011) was an American Republican Party politician who served as Mayor of Washington Township, Bergen County, New Jersey before being elected to the New Jersey General Assembly, where he served four terms representing the 39th Legislative District.

Born in Union City, Markert graduated from Union Hill High School.

Markert ran a local tavern and won election to the Washington Township Council in 1961, becoming the township's mayor in 1964 on a platform based on paving the many dirt roads in the community.

After Democrat Herbert Gladstone chose not to run for re-election in 1975, Markert ran for and won the open Assembly seat.

With Brendan Byrne at the top of the ticket winning the race for Governor of New Jersey, having defeated 39th district state senator Raymond Garramone in the primary, Frank Herbert won the 1977 race for Senate in the 39th District, standing together with his running mates in support of the establishment of a state income tax to defeat Markert, who had hoped to pick up Garramone's now open seat.

In the 1979 election, Gerald Cardinale and Markert defeated incumbent Democrat Greta Kiernan, who had herself defeated Markert two years earlier.

Markert moved to Westwood, New Jersey, and later to Point Pleasant, New Jersey.

Markert died of cancer at his Florida home on June 2, 2011. He was survived by his wife Jean and by two daughters.
