= Frank Herbert (politician) =

American politician (1931–2018)

Member of the New Jersey Senate from the 39th district
- In office January 10, 1978 – January 12, 1982
- Preceded by: Raymond Garramone
- Succeeded by: Gerald Cardinale

Personal details
- Born: Francis Xavier Herbert; January 11, 1931 Jersey City, New Jersey, U.S.
- Died: September 25, 2018 (aged 87) Denville, New Jersey
- Party: Democratic

Francis Xavier Herbert (January 11, 1931 – September 25, 2018) was an American school teacher and Democratic Party politician who served a single term in the New Jersey Senate where he represented the 39th Legislative District. He is the only candidate in New Jersey history to win a Federal primary election as a write-in candidate.

== Biography ==
Herbert was born on January 11, 1931, in Greenville, Jersey City, New Jersey to a working class, Irish Catholic family. Herbert received his bachelor's degree from Fordham University in 1956 and his master's degree in education from Montclair State University. He taught English at the William L. Dickinson High School in Jersey City from September 1956 at least through June 1960.

Herbert lost his first race for office running for the Borough Council in Waldwick, but ran again the next year and won. In the wake of anti-Republican sentiment against Richard Nixon, Herbert won a seat on the Bergen County Board of Chosen Freeholders in 1973, but lost the seat when he ran for re-election in 1976.

With Brendan Byrne at the top of the ticket winning the race for Governor of New Jersey, Herbert won the 1977 race for Senate in the 39th District, standing together with his running mates in support of the establishment of a state income tax to defeat Republican John Markert. Herbert was the sponsor of the bill that created NJ Transit, the statewide public transit agency, in July 1979.

Gerald Cardinale defeated the incumbent Herbert in 1981. Herbert fell short again running against Cardinale in 1983, losing by about 1,000 votes.

In 1994, Democratic Party officials asked Herbert, then a resident of Sparta Township, to run in the primary against John Kucek in New Jersey's 11th congressional district. Kucek proclaimed himself as a "Christian populist" was a Holocaust denier and a public admirer of KKK Grand Wizard David Duke. New Jersey Democratic chairman Tom Byrne was elated by the success of the write-in campaign for Herbert that was organized in conjunction with Jewish organizations in the district, saying that "the first thing we had to do was convince people not to vote for the Nazi" before convincing voters to cast a write-in ballot for Herbert. In the general election, Herbert lost resoundingly to Republican Rodney Frelinghuysen by a margin of 71.2%-28.0%.

By then a resident of Rockaway Township, Herbert won the Democratic primary for the party's state senate nomination in the 25th Legislative District in 2007. Campaigning on a platform that included a proposal to use a portion of revenue from the state's toll roads to fund lower fares on New Jersey Transit and opposing Bucco's vote against state funding for stem cell research, Herbert lost to incumbent Anthony Bucco by 61.5%-38.5%.

He was married to the former Eleanor Gillen and has three adult children. He died at the age of 87 on September 25, 2018.
