= New Jersey's 39th legislative district =

American legislative district

- Senator: Holly Schepisi (R)
- Assembly members: Robert Auth (R); John V. Azzariti (R)
- Registration: 29.9% Republican; 29.8% Democratic; 39.9% unaffiliated
- Demographics: 74.5% White; 1.9% Black/African American; 0.3% Native American; 12.2% Asian; 0.0% Hawaiian/Pacific Islander; 3.5% Other race; 7.7% Two or more races; 10.5% Hispanic
- Population: 217,994
- Voting-age population: 172,439
- Registered voters: 185,890

New Jersey's 39th legislative district is one of 40 in the state, including portions of Bergen County. Included are the Bergen County municipalities of Allendale, Alpine, Cresskill, Closter, Demarest, Dumont, Emerson, Harrington Park, Haworth, Hillsdale, Ho-Ho-Kus, Mahwah, Midland Park, Montvale, Northvale, Norwood, Oakland, Old Tappan, Park Ridge, Ramsey, River Vale, Rockleigh, Saddle River, Upper Saddle River, Waldwick, Washington Township, Westwood, and Woodcliff Lake.

== Demographic characteristics ==
As of the 2020 United States census, the district had a population of 217,994, of whom 172,439 (79.1%) were of voting age. The racial makeup of the district was 162,440 (74.5%) White, 4,051 (1.9%) African American, 645 (0.3%) Native American, 26,509 (12.2%) Asian, 31 (0.0%) Pacific Islander, 7,565 (3.5%) from some other race, and 16,753 (7.7%) from two or more races. Hispanic or Latino people of any race were 22,937 (10.5%) of the population.

The district had 191,537 registered voters as of February 1, 2025, of whom 76,170 (39.9%) were registered as unaffiliated, 56,888 (29.8%) were registered as Democrats, 57,082 (29.9%) were registered as Republicans, and 1,387 (0.7%) were registered to other parties.

The district, which covers most of Northern Bergen County, has the smallest African-American population of any district in the state and ranks 31st in the number of Hispanic residents, while it has the ninth-highest percentage of Asian residents. At 0.3% it has the lowest percentage of children receiving Temporary Assistance for Needy Families aid, just over 5% of the state average. The district ranked second-highest in both equalized property value and personal income on a per capita basis.

== Political representation ==
For the 2026–2027 session, the 39th legislative district of the New Jersey Legislature is represented in the State Senate by Holly Schepisi (R, River Vale) and in the General Assembly by Robert Auth (R, Old Tappan) and John V. Azzariti (R, Saddle River).

The legislative district is located within New Jersey's 5th congressional district and New Jersey's 9th congressional district.

== Apportionment history ==
Throughout most of the district's history since 1973, the year the 40-district legislative map was created in New Jersey, the 39th district has encompassed the small affluent boroughs and townships in northeast Bergen County. In the redistricting of 1981 and 1991, only a few municipalities were added and removed to get the district's population close to one-fortieth of the state's population as required under the Reynolds v. Sims ruling.

Changes to the district made as part of the New Jersey Legislative apportionment in 2001 removed Englewood Cliffs and Tenafly (to the 37th legislative district added Oradell (from the 38th legislative district) and Waldwick and Washington Township (from the 40th legislative district).

With Democrat Brendan Byrne at the top of the ticket winning the race for Governor of New Jersey, Frank Herbert won the 1977 race for Senate in the 39th district, standing together with his running mates in support of the establishment of a state income tax to defeat Republican John Markert.

In the 1979 election, Gerald Cardinale and Markert defeated incumbent Democrat Greta Kiernan, who had herself defeated Markert two years earlier.

Cardinale knocked off the incumbent State Senator Frank Herbert in 1981 and Herbert fell short again running against Cardinale in 1983, losing by about 1,000 votes.

Citing recent hip replacement surgery as a factor, John E. Rooney announced in March 2009 that he would not seek another term of office and would retire after 26 years in the legislature. He endorsed Bob Schroeder, a Washington Township councilmember, who won election to succeed him. After Charlotte Vandervalk decided not to run for re-election in 2011, Holly Schepisi ran in her place and won together with the other Republican incumbents.

Changes to the district made as part of the New Jersey Legislative apportionment in 2011 removed several Bergen County municipalities and added portions of Passaic County and northwest Bergen County.

Gerald Cardinale died in office on February 20, 2021, after 12 terms in office. Holly Schepisi won a Republican Party special convention over Robert Auth to fill the vacant senate seat and was sworn in on March 25, 2021. Upper Saddle River council member DeAnne DeFuccio edged out John V. Azzariti and was chosen by Republicans to fill the Assembly seat vacated by Schepisi; she took office on April 9, 2021.

On February 2, 2023, DeFuccio announced that she would not seek re-election to the Assembly, despite previously announcing her candidacy, and John Azzariti was chosen to fill DeFuccio's slot in the 2023 New Jersey General Assembly election.

== Election history ==
Session	Senate	General Assembly	
1974–1975	Raymond Garramone (D)	Herbert M. Gladstone (D)	Harold Martin (D)
1976–1977	Raymond Garramone (D)	John Markert (R)	Harold Martin (D)
1978–1979	Frank Herbert (D)	Greta Kiernan (D)	Harold Martin (D)
1980–1981	Frank Herbert (D)	John Markert (R)	Gerald Cardinale (R)
1982–1983	Gerald Cardinale (R)	John Markert (R)	Joan M. Wright (R) (Note: Resigned February 28, 1983 to join the Department of Community Affairs Division of Women)
1982–1983	Gerald Cardinale (R)	John Markert (R)	John E. Rooney (R) (Note: Elected to the Assembly in April 1983 special election, sworn in on May 5, 1983)
1984–1985	Gerald Cardinale (R)	John Markert (R) (Note: Resigned February 4, 1985 to become deputy director of Alcoholic Beverage Control Commission)	John E. Rooney (R)
1984–1985	Gerald Cardinale (R)	Elizabeth Randall (R) (Note: Elected to the Assembly in a March 1985 special election, sworn in on April 5, 1985)	John E. Rooney (R)
1986–1987	Gerald Cardinale (R)	Elizabeth Randall (R)	John E. Rooney (R)
1988–1989	Gerald Cardinale (R)	Elizabeth Randall (R)	John E. Rooney (R)
1990–1991	Gerald Cardinale (R)	Elizabeth Randall (R) (Note: Resigned January 31, 1991 to become Bergen County counsel)	John E. Rooney (R)
1990–1991	Gerald Cardinale (R)	Charlotte Vandervalk (R) (Note: Appointed to the Assembly on February 21, 1991)	John E. Rooney (R)
1992–1993	Gerald Cardinale (R)	Charlotte Vandervalk (R)	John E. Rooney (R)
1994–1995	Gerald Cardinale (R)	Charlotte Vandervalk (R)	John E. Rooney (R)
1996–1997	Gerald Cardinale (R)	Charlotte Vandervalk (R)	John E. Rooney (R)
1998–1999	Gerald Cardinale (R)	Charlotte Vandervalk (R)	John E. Rooney (R)
2000–2001	Gerald Cardinale (R)	Charlotte Vandervalk (R)	John E. Rooney (R)
2002–2003	Gerald Cardinale (R)	Charlotte Vandervalk (R)	John E. Rooney (R)
2004–2005	Gerald Cardinale (R)	Charlotte Vandervalk (R)	John E. Rooney (R)
2006–2007	Gerald Cardinale (R)	Charlotte Vandervalk (R)	John E. Rooney (R)
2008–2009	Gerald Cardinale (R)	Charlotte Vandervalk (R)	John E. Rooney (R)
2010–2011	Gerald Cardinale (R)	Charlotte Vandervalk (R)	Bob Schroeder (R)
2012–2013	Gerald Cardinale (R)	Holly Schepisi (R)	Bob Schroeder (R)
2014–2015	Gerald Cardinale (R)	Holly Schepisi (R)	Robert Auth (R)
2016–2017	Gerald Cardinale (R)	Holly Schepisi (R)	Robert Auth (R)
2018–2019	Gerald Cardinale (R) (Note: Died February 20, 2021)	Holly Schepisi (R)	Robert Auth (R)
2020–2021	Gerald Cardinale (R)	Holly Schepisi (R) (Note: Appointed to the Senate on March 25, 2021)	Robert Auth (R)
2020–2021	Holly Schepisi (R)	DeAnne DeFuccio (R) (Note: Appointed to the Assembly on April 9, 2021)	Robert Auth (R)
2022–2023	Holly Schepisi (R)	DeAnne DeFuccio (R)	Robert Auth (R)
2024–2025	Holly Schepisi (R)	John V. Azzariti (R)	Robert Auth (R)
2026–2027	Holly Schepisi (R)	John V. Azzariti (R)	Robert Auth (R)

== Election results ==
=== Senate ===
2021 New Jersey general election
Party	Candidate	Votes	%	±%
Republican	Holly Schepisi	45,985	57.2	▲4.4
Democratic	Ruth Dugan	34,065	42.3	▼4.0
Libertarian	James Tosone	403	0.5	▼0.4
Total votes		80,453	100.0	

New Jersey general election, 2017
Party	Candidate	Votes	%	±%
Republican	Gerald Cardinale	33,752	52.8	▼10.8
Democratic	Linda H. Schwager	29,631	46.3	▲9.9
Libertarian	James Tosone	574	0.9	N/A
Total votes		63,957	100.0	

New Jersey general election, 2013
Party	Candidate	Votes	%	±%
Republican	Gerald Cardinale	37,836	63.6	▲0.1
Democratic	Jane “Jan” Bidwell	21,616	36.4	▼0.1
Total votes		59,452	100.0	

2011 New Jersey general election
Party	Candidate	Votes	%
Republican	Gerald Cardinale	28,041	63.5
Democratic	Lorraine M. Waldes	16,097	36.5
Total votes		44,138	100.0

2007 New Jersey general election
Party	Candidate	Votes	%	±%
Republican	S. Gerald Cardinale	27,623	55.4	▼6.9
Democratic	Joseph Ariyan	22,272	44.6	▲6.9
Total votes		48,895	100.0	

2003 New Jersey general election
Party	Candidate	Votes	%	±%
Republican	Gerald Cardinale	30,718	62.3	▼0.6
Democratic	Richard Muti	18,605	37.7	▲1.5
Total votes		49,323	100.0	

2001 New Jersey general election
Party	Candidate	Votes	%
Republican	S. Gerald Cardinale	42,717	62.9
Democratic	Alan Baskin	24,543	36.2
Conservative	George E. Soroka	616	0.9
Total votes		67,876	100.0

1997 New Jersey general election
Party	Candidate	Votes	%	±%
Republican	Gerald Cardinale	46,424	66.3	▲3.8
Democratic	Ilan Plawker	22,466	32.1	▼5.4
Conservative	Michael W. Koontz	1,166	1.7	N/A
Total votes		70,056	100.0	

1993 New Jersey general election
Party	Candidate	Votes	%	±%
Republican	Gerald Cardinale	48,803	62.5	▼4.4
Democratic	Stephen H. Jaffe	29,268	37.5	▲4.4
Total votes		78,071	100.0	

1991 New Jersey general election
Party	Candidate	Votes	%
Republican	Gerald Cardinale	37,135	66.9
Democratic	Mary Donohue	18,336	33.1
Total votes		55,471	100.0

1987 New Jersey general election
Party	Candidate	Votes	%	±%
Republican	Gerald Cardinale	31,585	67.1	▲15.9
Democratic	Louis B. Redisch	15,499	32.9	▼15.9
Total votes		47,084	100.0	

1983 New Jersey general election
Party	Candidate	Votes	%	±%
Republican	Gerald Cardinale	27,199	51.2	▼7.0
Democratic	Francis X. Herbert	25,942	48.8	▲7.0
Total votes		53,141	100.0	

1981 New Jersey general election
Party	Candidate	Votes	%
Republican	Gerald Cardinale	38,929	58.2
Democratic	Francis X. Herbert	27,948	41.8
Total votes		66,877	100.0

1977 New Jersey general election
Party	Candidate	Votes	%	±%
Democratic	Francis X. Herbert	28,658	52.8	▼1.5
Republican	John W. Markert	25,582	47.2	▲1.5
Total votes		54,240	100.0	

1973 New Jersey general election
Party	Candidate	Votes	%
Democratic	Raymond Garramone	31,999	54.3
Republican	Harry Randall Jr.	26,942	45.7
Total votes		58,941	100.0

=== General Assembly ===
2025 New Jersey general election
Party	Candidate	Votes	%	±%
Republican	Robert Auth	50,382	25.9	
Republican	John Azzariti	49,650	25.6	
Democratic	Andrew LaBruno	47,214	24.3	
Democratic	Donna Abene	46,991	24.2	
Total votes		156,732	100.0	

2021 New Jersey general election
Party	Candidate	Votes	%	±%
Republican	Robert Auth	44,343	28.3	▲1.8
Republican	DeAnne DeFuccio	43,791	27.9	▼0.3
Democratic	Melinda J. Iannuzzi	34,890	22.3	▼0.6
Democratic	Karlito A. Almeda	33,708	21.5	▼0.9
Total votes		194,237	100.0	

2019 New Jersey general election
Party	Candidate	Votes	%	±%
Republican	Holly T. Schepisi	30,705	28.2	▲0.8
Republican	Robert J. Auth	28,786	26.5	▲0.3
Democratic	John Birkner Jr.	24,898	22.9	▼0.4
Democratic	Gerald Falotico	24,302	22.4	▼0.7
Total votes		108,691	100.0	

New Jersey general election, 2017
Party	Candidate	Votes	%	±%
Republican	Holly Schepisi	34,158	27.4	▼3.9
Republican	Robert Auth	32,739	26.2	▼2.6
Democratic	Jannie Chung	29,126	23.3	▲3.0
Democratic	Annie Hausmann	28,862	23.1	▲3.4
Total votes		124,885	100.0	

New Jersey general election, 2015
Party	Candidate	Votes	%	±%
Republican	Holly Schepisi	22,016	31.3	▼1.1
Republican	Robert Auth	20,227	28.8	▼0.8
Democratic	John DeRienzo	14,258	20.3	▲0.6
Democratic	Jeffrey Goldsmith	13,840	19.7	▲1.4
Total votes		70,341	100.0	

New Jersey general election, 2013
Party	Candidate	Votes	%	±%
Republican	Holly Schepisi	36,873	32.4	▲2.1
Republican	Robert Auth	33,680	29.6	▼1.3
Democratic	Donna C. Abene	22,450	19.7	▲0.9
Democratic	Anthony N. Iannarelli Jr.	20,785	18.3	0.0
Total votes		113,788	100.0	

New Jersey general election, 2011
Party	Candidate	Votes	%
Republican	Robert Schroeder	26,572	30.9
Republican	Holly Schepisi	26,111	30.3
Democratic	Michael J. McCarthy	16,200	18.8
Democratic	Anthony N. Iannarelli Jr.	15,784	18.3
Independent	Clinton Bosca	1,425	1.7
Total votes		86,092	100.0

New Jersey general election, 2009
Party	Candidate	Votes	%	±%
Republican	Charlotte Vandervalk	44,612	33.0	▲2.3
Republican	Robert Schroeder	42,477	31.5	▲3.7
Democratic	Michael J. McCarthy	24,577	18.2	▼3.9
Democratic	John L. Shahdanian, II	23,356	17.3	▼2.1
Total votes		135,022	100.0	

New Jersey general election, 2007
Party	Candidate	Votes	%	±%
Republican	Charlotte Vandervalk	30,234	30.7	▲2.3
Republican	John E. Rooney	27,353	27.8	▲1.5
Democratic	Esther Fletcher	21,771	22.1	▼0.3
Democratic	Carl J. Manna	19,099	19.4	▼2.9
Total votes		98,457	100.0	

New Jersey general election, 2005
Party	Candidate	Votes	%	±%
Republican	Charlotte Vandervalk	37,910	28.4	▼4.6
Republican	John E. Rooney	35,062	26.3	▼6.1
Democratic	Josephine Higgins	29,885	22.4	▲5.1
Democratic	Dennis Testa	29,825	22.3	▲5.0
Libertarian	James P. Conway	793	0.6	N/A
Total votes		133,475	100.0	

New Jersey general election, 2003
Party	Candidate	Votes	%	±%
Republican	Charlotte Vandervalk	31,701	33.0	▲1.6
Republican	John E. Rooney	31,173	32.4	▲2.0
Democratic	John Dean DeRienzo	16,665	17.3	▼2.7
Democratic	Philip Peredo	16,652	17.3	▼0.9
Total votes		96,191	100.0	

New Jersey general election, 2001
Party	Candidate	Votes	%
Republican	Charlotte Vandervalk	41,586	31.4
Republican	John E. Rooney	40,277	30.4
Democratic	Linda Mercurio	26,447	20.0
Democratic	Jim Carroll	24,037	18.2
Total votes		132,347	100.0

New Jersey general election, 1999
Party	Candidate	Votes	%	±%
Republican	Charlotte Vandervalk	26,659	30.6	▼2.2
Republican	John E. Rooney	25,991	29.8	▼2.1
Democratic	Michael Kasparian	16,202	18.6	▲1.7
Democratic	Ilan Plawker	15,931	18.3	▲1.7
Spirit of Service	Linda A. Mercurio	1,076	1.2	N/A
Conservative	Judith Klein	394	0.5	▼0.2
Conservative	Michael Koontz	349	0.4	▼0.3
"Sworn to Reform"	George E. Soroka	266	0.3	N/A
"Sworn to Reform"	Jeffrey C. Hogue	239	0.3	N/A
Total votes		87,107	100.0	

New Jersey general election, 1997
Party	Candidate	Votes	%	±%
Republican	Charlotte Vandervalk	44,522	32.8	▲2.2
Republican	John E. Rooney	43,203	31.9	▲2.6
Democratic	Sherri Lippman	22,847	16.9	▼2.7
Democratic	Eric S. Aronson	22,446	16.6	▼2.1
Conservative	Pasquale Salimone	951	0.7	0.0
Conservative	Cynthia Soroka	926	0.7	0.0
Libertarian	Thomas Fischetti	666	0.5	N/A
Total votes		135,561	100.0	

New Jersey general election, 1995
Party	Candidate	Votes	%	±%
Republican	Charlotte Vandervalk	27,768	30.6	▼2.3
Republican	John E. Rooney	26,539	29.3	▼2.3
Democratic	Kay Palacios	17,727	19.6	▲1.1
Democratic	Alan Baskin	16,917	18.7	▲2.1
Conservative	Anthony Descisciolo	649	0.7	N/A
Conservative	Leroy A. Wolf	619	0.7	N/A
Equality To All	K.C. Tan	437	0.5	N/A
Total votes		90,656	100.0	

New Jersey general election, 1993
Party	Candidate	Votes	%	±%
Republican	Charlotte Vandervalk	49,531	32.9	▼8.8
Republican	John E. Rooney	47,593	31.6	▼6.7
Democratic	Mary R. Smith	27,869	18.5	▲1.5
Democratic	Donald W. Becker	25,057	16.6	N/A
Populist	Patricia Rainsford	537	0.4	▼1.1
Total votes		150,587	100.0	

1991 New Jersey general election
Party	Candidate	Votes	%
Republican	Charlotte Vandervalk	40,864	41.7
Republican	John E. Rooney	37,573	38.3
Democratic	Andrew Vaccaro	16,609	17.0
Populist	Patricia Rainsford	1,498	1.5
Populist	Robert Reiss	1,440	1.5
Total votes		97,984	100.0

1989 New Jersey general election
Party	Candidate	Votes	%	±%
Republican	Elizabeth E. Randall	36,010	30.1	▼2.2
Republican	John E. Rooney	34,271	28.6	▼2.7
Democratic	Gus D’Ercole	24,715	20.6	▲1.9
Democratic	Robert P. Contillo	24,709	20.6	▲2.8
Total votes		119,705	100.0	

1987 New Jersey general election
Party	Candidate	Votes	%	±%
Republican	Elizabeth E. Randall	29,548	32.3	▼1.0
Republican	John E. Rooney	28,619	31.3	▼0.3
Democratic	William J. Daly	17,083	18.7	▲1.0
Democratic	Robert P. Bonanno	16,264	17.8	▲0.5
Total votes		91,514	100.0	

1985 New Jersey general election
Party	Candidate	Votes	%	±%
Republican	Elizabeth E. Randall	35,172	33.3	▲4.4
Republican	John E. Rooney	33,358	31.6	▲2.9
Democratic	Joseph A. Ferriero	18,714	17.7	▼4.2
Democratic	Fay Yeager	18,257	17.3	▼3.2
Total votes		105,501	100.0	

Special election, March 26, 1985
Party	Candidate	Votes	%
Republican	Elizabeth Randall	7,183	59.8
Democratic	Joseph A. Ferriero	4,834	40.2
Total votes		12,017	100.0

New Jersey general election, 1983
Party	Candidate	Votes	%	±%
Republican	John W. Markert	29,676	28.9	▼1.3
Republican	John E. Rooney	29,509	28.7	▼2.8
Democratic	Lucy M. Heller	22,518	21.9	▲2.2
Democratic	Michael D’Antoni	21,075	20.5	▲1.9
Total votes		102,778	100.0	

Special election, April 26, 1983
Party	Candidate	Votes	%
Republican	John E. Rooney	5,461	56.5
Democratic	Lucy M. Heller	4,208	43.5
Total votes		9,669	100.0

New Jersey general election, 1981
Party	Candidate	Votes	%
Republican	Joan M. Wright	40,547	31.5
Republican	John W. Markert	38,781	30.2
Democratic	Raymond E. McKenna	25,353	19.7
Democratic	Harold Martin	23,916	18.6
Total votes		128,597	100.0

New Jersey general election, 1979
Party	Candidate	Votes	%	±%
Republican	Gerald Cardinale	27,608	28.1	▲4.8
Republican	John W. Markert	27,450	28.0	▲4.7
Democratic	Greta Kiernan	21,425	21.8	▼4.2
Democratic	Harold Martin	20,577	21.0	▼5.1
Libertarian	Henry Koch	809	0.8	▲0.2
U.S. Labor	Elliot Greenspan	308	0.3	0.0
Total votes		98,177	100.0	

New Jersey general election, 1977
Party	Candidate	Votes	%	±%
Democratic	Harold Martin	28,105	26.1	▲0.7
Democratic	Greta Kiernan	28,026	26.0	▲1.1
Republican	Gerald Cardinale	25,087	23.3	▼1.9
Republican	John F. Inganamort	25,041	23.3	▼1.2
Libertarian	Henry Koch	681	0.6	N/A
Libertarian	William J. Zelko, Jr.	432	0.4	N/A
U.S. Labor	Elliot I. Greenspan	276	0.3	N/A
Total votes		107,648	100.0	

New Jersey general election, 1975
Party	Candidate	Votes	%	±%
Democratic	Harold Martin	27,516	25.4	▼1.7
Republican	John W. Markert	27,226	25.2	▲1.9
Democratic	Frederick P. Sharkey	26,979	24.9	▼1.5
Republican	Harold F. Benel	26,521	24.5	▲1.3
Total votes		108,242	100.0	

New Jersey general election, 1973
Party	Candidate	Votes	%
Democratic	Harold Martin	30,982	27.1
Democratic	Herbert M. Gladstone	30,143	26.4
Republican	James Walker Ralph	26,642	23.3
Republican	Robert C. Veit	26,583	23.2
Total votes		114,350	100.0
