= John E. Rooney (politician) =

American politician (1939–2025)

Member of the New Jersey General Assembly from the 39th district
- In office May 5, 1983 – January 12, 2010
- Preceded by: Joan M. Wright
- Succeeded by: Bob Schroeder

Personal details
- Born: April 23, 1939 New York City, U.S.
- Died: March 18, 2025 (aged 85)
- Party: Republican

John E. Rooney (April 23, 1939 – March 18, 2025) was an American Republican Party politician, who served in the New Jersey General Assembly, where he represented the 39th Legislative District. He served in the Assembly from 1983 to 2010, which made him the longest-serving representative in the General Assembly. He retired from the Assembly after his term expired in January 2010 and endorsed Republican Washington Township Councilman Bob Schroeder in the 2009 election who won his seat. Rooney served as a council member in Northvale from 1976 to 1979. In 1979 he was elected Mayor of Northvale and served until 1988. He held dual office as Mayor of Northvale and state assemblyman during this period. After the residents of Northvale asked him to run again in 1992 he won that election and served again as Mayor of Northvale and state assemblyman.

== Biography ==
Rooney served in the Assembly on the Environment and Solid Waste Committee and the Telecommunications and Utilities Committee. He had served on the Regulatory Oversight Committees and on the Intergovernmental Relations Commission.

Rooney served as Mayor of Northvale, New Jersey from 1991 until his re-election defeat in 2006, when he was defeated by Democrat John Hogan. He also served as mayor from 1979 to 1986 and was a member of the borough council from 1976 to 1978. He was a commissioner serving on the Bergen County Utility Authority from 1983 to 1988.

Rooney graduated with an A.A.S. from Syracuse University (Language), received training at the Air Force Institute (Russian) and graduated with a B.S. degree from Rutgers University (Management). He served in the United States Air Force from 1961 to 1965 as an airman first class. Rooney worked as an independent consultant. He died on March 18, 2025, at the age of 85.
