= Charlotte Vandervalk =

American politician (born 1937)

Member of the New Jersey General Assembly from the 39th district
- In office February 21, 1991 – January 10, 2012
- Preceded by: Elizabeth Randall
- Succeeded by: Holly Schepisi

Personal details
- Born: July 31, 1937 (age 88) Allentown, Pennsylvania, U.S.
- Party: Republican

Charlotte Vandervalk (born July 31, 1937) is an American Republican Party politician who served in the New Jersey General Assembly from 1991 until 2012, representing the 39th legislative district. She served in the Assembly as Deputy Republican Leader from 2002 to 2003 and Assistant Majority Leader from 1992 to 1995.

Vandervalk served in the Assembly on the Higher Education Committee and the Housing and Local Government Committee.

Vandervalk worked in the legislature on health care policy, sponsoring legislation on HMO reform, appropriations of expanded funds to home health care and the Work First NJ welfare reform program. She has served on the Governor’s Advisory Council on AIDS since 2002, and on the Commission for Study of Pain Management Policy, since 2003. She served on the Certificate of Need Study Commission in 1999, the Governor’s Task Force on Welfare Reform in 1996 and the Capital Planning Commission from 1991-1992. Vandervalk served on the Bergen County Board of Chosen Freeholders from 1986-1991 and was a member of the Montvale Borough Council from 1980-1985.

On August 25, 2011, Vandervalk announced that she would not run for re-election in November, saying that she wanted to spend more time with her family, and would continue to serve until her term ended in January 2012. In January 2012 she was succeeded in the Assembly by Holly Schepisi.
