= Holly Schepisi =

American politician (born 1971)

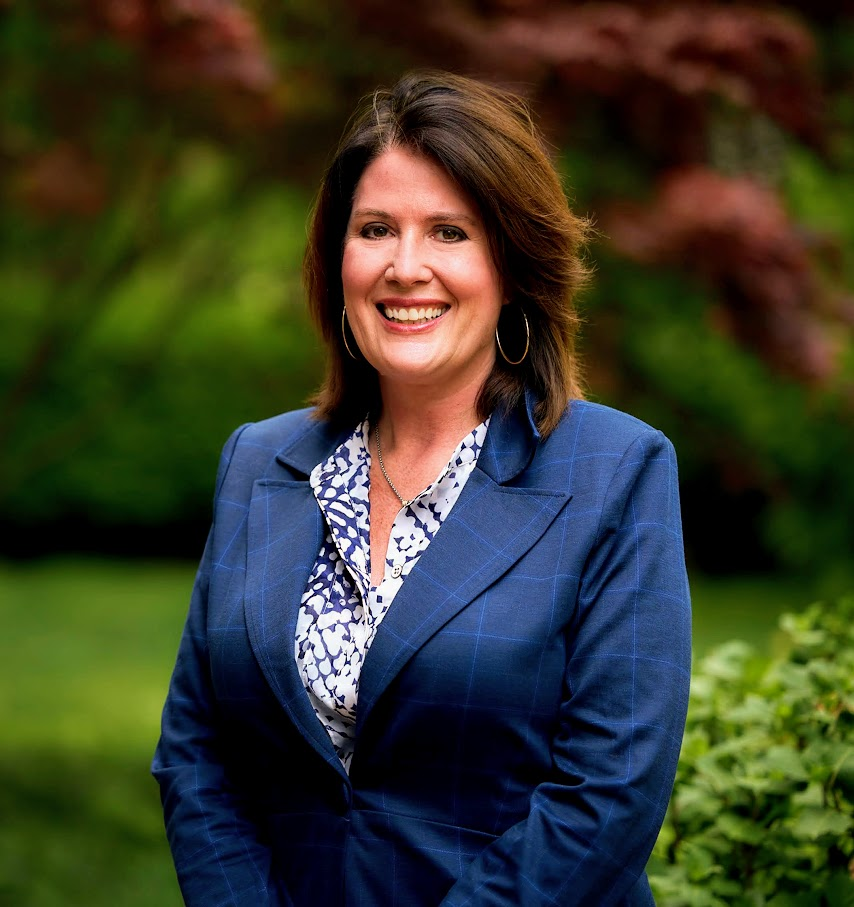

Member of the New Jersey Senate from the 39th district
- Incumbent
- Assumed office March 25, 2021
- Preceded by: Gerald Cardinale

Member of the New Jersey General Assembly from the 39th district
- In office January 10, 2012 – March 24, 2021
- Preceded by: Charlotte Vandervalk
- Succeeded by: DeAnne DeFuccio

Personal details
- Born: December 20, 1971 (age 54)
- Party: Republican
- Spouse: Paul Garfinkel
- Children: 2
- Education: Catholic University (BA); Fordham University (JD)
- Website: State Senate website

Holly T. Schepisi (born December 20, 1971) is an American lawyer, businesswoman, and Republican Party politician who is the New Jersey State Senator, representing the 39th legislative district, in office since 2021.

Schepisi previously served in the New Jersey General Assembly, from January 10, 2012, until March 24, 2021. She has served as Deputy Minority Leader since January 14, 2020, and served as Assistant Minority Leader for two years before then. On March 9, 2021, she was chosen to succeed long-serving Senator Gerald Cardinale in the State Senate, who died in office. She was sworn in on March 25, 2021.

== Background ==
Schepisi was born on December 20, 1971, the daughter of John A. Schepisi, a lawyer and former chairman of the Bergen County Republican Organization. She earned a Bachelor of Arts degree from The Catholic University of America in politics and psychology in 1993, and a Juris Doctor from Fordham University School of Law in 1997. While in college, she worked at the 1992 Republican National Convention, interned for Organization of American States, Congresswoman Marge Roukema, and a member of the British Parliament. In 2007, she began serving as the Township Attorney for River Vale, a position she held until 2011. In addition, she was also a public defender for Oakland (2012–2014) and an alternate prosecutor for Old Tappan (2010–2011) and Westwood (2002–2011).

As of 2015, Schepisi and her husband, Paul Garfinkel, live in River Vale, New Jersey; they have two children. In March 2015, she suffered a brain aneurysm but fully recovered after surgery in the summer of 2015.

== New Jersey Assembly ==
In August 2011, Charlotte Vandervalk announced her retirement from the General Assembly seat in the 39th district. A resident of River Vale, Schepisi was selected by the Bergen County Republican Organization to take Vandervalk's place on the ballot, and in the general election she and her running mate Bob Schroeder defeated the Democratic candidates, Anthony Iannarelli Jr. and Michael McCarthy. She was sworn in on January 10, 2012.

=== Tenure ===
In 2014, Schepisi introduced a bill that would have weakened vaccination requirements for school children. The bill would have allowed certain children under the age of six to attend school without receiving a Hepatitis B vaccine. Schepisi stated that the debunked link between vaccines and autism was not her "primary rationale" for introducing the bill. The bill did not become law. In the summer of 2017, Schepisi held the first of several planned public hearing in Paramus with various civic leaders on mandated affordable housing under the Mount Laurel Doctrine with local mayors and other state assembly members. In October 2018 Schepisi joined then-Republican State Senator Dawn Addiego and Republicans Kristin Corrado, Amy Handlin, DiAnne Gove, Serena DiMaso, BettyLou DeCroce, and Nancy Munoz in calling for an investigation into Governor Phil Murphy's hiring practices.

=== Committees ===
Committee assignments for the current session are:

- Community and Urban Affairs
- Health, Human Services and Senior Citizens

=== District 39 ===
Each of the 40 districts in the New Jersey Legislature has one representative in the New Jersey Senate and two members in the New Jersey General Assembly. The representatives from the 39th District for the 2024—25 Legislative Session are:

- Senator Holly Schepisi (R)
- Assemblyman Robert Auth (R)
- Assemblywoman John V. Azzariti (R)

== Electoral history ==
=== New Jersey Senate ===
39th Legislative District General Election, 2023
Party	Candidate	Votes	%
Republican	Holly Schepisi (incumbent)	34,448	54.9
Democratic	Jodi A. Murphy	28,264	45.1
Total votes		62,712	100.0
Republican hold			

2021 New Jersey general election
Party	Candidate	Votes	%	±%
Republican	Holly Schepisi (Incumbent)	45,985	57.2	
Democratic	Ruth Dugan	34,065	42.3	
Libertarian	James Tosone	403	0.01	
Total votes		80,453	100.0	

=== 2019 ===
In what was one of the most competitive races in 2019 Schepisi and her running mate Robert Auth won re-election by 6,000 and 4,000 votes respectively. During the campaign, controversy surrounding Assembly Minority Leader Jon Bramnick's law website drew their Democratic opponents, Gerald Falotico and John Birkner, to call on them to condemn the website.

2019 General Election in 39th District
Party	Candidate	Votes	%	±%
Republican	Holly Schepisi (Incumbent)	30,705	28.2%	▲1.1
Republican	Robert Auth (Incumbent)	28,786	26.4%	▲0.2
Democratic	John Birkner Jr.	17,557	22.9%	▼1.1
Democratic	Gerald Falotico	17,332	22.3%	▼0.2
Total votes		'108,691'	'100.0'	

=== 2017 ===
In the tightest election of Schepisi's career in the Assembly she won re-election.

2017 General Election in 39th District
Party	Candidate	Votes	%	±%
Republican	Holly Schepisi (Incumbent)	34,158	27.4	▼3.9
Republican	Robert Auth (Incumbent)	32,739	26.2	▼2.6
Democratic	Jannie Chung	29,126	23.3	▲3.0
Democratic	Annie Hausmann	28,862	23.1	▲3.4
Total votes		'124,885'	'100.0'	

=== 2015 ===
In a generally bad year for Republicans in New Jersey, Schepisi and Auth cruised to re-election.

2015 General Election in 39th District
Party	Candidate	Votes	%	±%
Republican	Holly Schepisi (Incumbent)	22,016	31.3	▼1.1
Republican	Robert Auth (Incumbent)	20,227	28.8	▼0.8
Democratic	John DeRienzo	14,258	20.3	▲0.6
Democratic	Jeffrey Goldsmith	13,840	19.7	▲1.4
Total votes		'70,341'	'100.0'	

=== 2013 ===
In 2013 Governor Chris Christie easily beat Democrat Barbara Buono and Schepisi and her new running mate Robert Auth easily beat their Democratic opponents.

2013 General Election in 39th District
Party	Candidate	Votes	%	±%
Republican	Holly Schepisi (Incumbent)	36,873	32.4	▲2.1
Republican	Robert Auth	33,680	29.6	▼1.3
Democratic	Donna C. Abene	22,450	19.7	▲0.9
Democratic	Anthony N. Iannarelli Jr.	20,785	18.3	0.0
Total votes		'113,788'	'100.0'	

=== 2011 ===
After the 2011 re-districting the 39th District was still widely considered "safe republican". Schepisi ran for the Assembly for the first time and easily placed second.

2011 General Election in 39th District
Party	Candidate	Votes	%
Republican	Robert Schroeder (Incumbent)	26,572	30.9
Republican	Holly Schepisi	26,111	30.3
Democratic	Michael J. McCarthy	16,200	18.8
Democratic	Anthony N. Iannarelli Jr.	15,784	18.3
Independent	Clinton Bosca	1,425	1.7
Total votes		86,092	100.0
