= DeAnne DeFuccio =

Member of the New Jersey General Assembly

Member of the New Jersey General Assembly from the 39th district
- In office April 9, 2021 – January 9, 2024
- Preceded by: Holly Schepisi
- Succeeded by: John Azzariti

Personal details
- Born: March 26, 1973 (age 53) Oakland, New Jersey, U.S.
- Party: Republican
- Education: Union College (BS); Suffolk University Law School (JD)
- Website: Legislative webpage

DeAnne DeFuccio (born March 26, 1973) is an American Republican Party politician who served in the New Jersey General Assembly from the 39th district from 2021 to 2024.

== Early life and education ==
Born in Oakland, DeFuccio grew up in nearby Franklin Lakes. She earned her undergraduate degree from Union College and was awarded a juris doctor degree from Suffolk University Law School.

== Political office ==
She had served as a member of the borough council in Upper Saddle River, New Jersey until she was chosen to fill the Assembly seat vacated by Holly Schepisi, who had moved up to the New Jersey Senate. She was the Assistant Minority Conference Leader in the Assembly from 2022 to 2024.

On February 2, 2023, DeFuccio announced that she would not seek re-election to the Assembly, despite previously announcing her candidacy.
