= Harold Martin (New Jersey politician) =

American politician (1918–2010)

Member of the New Jersey General Assembly from the 39th district
- In office January 8, 1974 – January 8, 1980
- Preceded by: District created
- Succeeded by: Gerald Cardinale; John Markert

Personal details
- Born: February 25, 1918 West New York, New Jersey
- Died: October 19, 2010 (aged 92) Cresskill, New Jersey
- Party: Democratic

Harold Martin (February 25, 1918 – October 19, 2010) was an American Democratic Party politician who served a single term on the Bergen County, New Jersey Board of Chosen Freeholders and was elected to three terms in the New Jersey General Assembly, where he represented the 39th Legislative District.

== Biography ==
Martin was born in West New York, New Jersey, and moved with his family as a child to Brooklyn where he attended New Utrecht High School. He attended both the University of Missouri and the University of Arizona, before attending Rutgers University where he earned bachelor's and master's degrees with majors in political science and economics. He later took courses in government at the New School for Social Research. He enlisted in the United States Army in 1943, where he ultimately achieved the rank of second lieutenant, serving in counterintelligence and in the design of amphibious assault vehicles.

After completing his military service, Martin worked as a research economist at the Federal Reserve Bank of New York and as an editor for the Shell Oil Company. He worked as a sales representative selling electronics and spent two years on Wall Street as an account executive at Shearson, Hammill & Co. He started attending council meetings in his hometown of Cresskill, New Jersey, and was chosen for a seat on the borough's planning board in addition to being chosen to serve on the Bergen County Planning Board. Martin has four children and eight grandchildren.

== Political career ==
He was elected to the Bergen County Board of Chosen Freeholders in 1964, making him the first Democrat to be elected to the board in 50 years, though he lost his re-election bid in 1967. He was elected to the New Jersey General Assembly in 1973 to represent the 39th District, promoting himself as "your full time Democratic assemblyman" and serving on the Education Committee and Appropriations Committee. A supporter of income taxes as a means of raising revenue in a more equitable manner, he voted in favor of the state income tax bill in the legislature. Governor of New Jersey Brendan Byrne recalled in an interview following Martin's death that "he not only supported [state income tax], he believed in it". Martin also supported legislation to protect the New Jersey Pinelands National Reserve and sponsored a bill to increase the amount of state loans offered to students in graduate school. He unsuccessfully advocated on behalf of a bill he sponsored to make willemite the official state mineral of New Jersey and Palisades diabase as the state rock, though by the time of his death New Jersey had still not chosen an official mineral or rock as many other states have. The Assembly passed a bill sponsored in 1977 by Martin, a former smoker, prohibiting smoking while in the Assembly chambers or during committee meetings.

A longtime resident of Cresskill, Martin died at the age of 92 on October 19, 2010. He was survived by his wife, the former Reba Lerner, as well as by their two daughters, two sons and eight grandchildren.
