= Gerald Cardinale =

American politician (1934–2021)

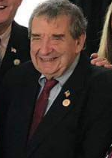

Member of the New Jersey Senate from the 39th district
- In office January 12, 1982 – February 20, 2021
- Preceded by: Frank Herbert
- Succeeded by: Holly Schepisi

Deputy Majority Leader of the New Jersey Senate
- In office January 11, 1994 – January 8, 2002
- Leader: Donald DiFrancesco
- Succeeded by: Wayne R. Bryant

Majority Whip of the New Jersey Senate
- In office January 14, 1992 – January 11, 1994
- Leader: Donald DiFrancesco
- Succeeded by: John A. Girgenti 2004

Assistant Minority Leader of the New Jersey Senate
- In office January 13, 1987 – January 10, 1989
- Leader: James R. Hurley

Minority Whip of the New Jersey Senate
- In office January 8, 1985 – January 13, 1987
- Leader: S. Thomas Gagliano

Member of the New Jersey General Assembly from the 39th district
- In office January 8, 1980 – January 12, 1982 Serving with John Markert
- Preceded by: Greta Kiernan; Harold Martin
- Succeeded by: Joan M. Wright

Personal details
- Born: February 27, 1934 Brooklyn, New York, U.S.
- Died: February 20, 2021 (aged 86) Westwood, New Jersey, U.S.
- Resting place: Brookside Cemetery
- Party: Republican
- Education: St. John's University (BS); New York University (DDS)
- Occupation: Legislator
- Website: Legislative Webpage

Gerald Cardinale (February 27, 1934 – February 20, 2021) was an American Republican Party politician, who served in the New Jersey State Senate from 1982 until his death in 2021, representing the 39th Legislative District. He also served one term in the New Jersey General Assembly from 1980 until 1982. At the time of his death, he was the second-most senior senator in the state, behind Richard Codey, who also came to office in January 1982, but had served in the General Assembly since 1974. Cardinale was a delegate to the Republican National Convention in 1984, 1988 and 1992 and served as a Delegate to the New Jersey Republican State Platform Committee in 1983.

== Early life ==
Cardinale was born in Brooklyn on February 27, 1934. He studied chemistry at St. John's University, obtaining Bachelor of Science in 1955. He subsequently earned a D.D.S. from the New York University College of Dentistry in 1959. He was a dentist by profession, and he had an office in Fort Lee, New Jersey. He resided in Demarest, where he served as mayor from 1975 to 1979. He was also a trustee of the Demarest Public Schools Board of Education from 1967 to 1973, serving as its president from 1969 to 1971.

== Political career ==
=== New Jersey Assembly ===
Before his service as State Senator, Cardinale spent one term in the lower house of the New Jersey Legislature, the General Assembly, from 1980 to 1981.

=== New Jersey Senate ===
Cardinale served in the State Senate as deputy majority leader from 1994 to 2001, as majority whip from 1992 to 1993, as assistant minority leader from 1987 to 1989 and as minority whip from 1985 to 1986. He served in the Senate on the Commerce Committee, the Judiciary Committee and the Legislative Oversight Committee.

In 2018, Cardinale sponsored a bill alongside Senators Paul Sarlo, Kristin Corrado, Loretta Weinberg, and Joseph Lagana that would push a special election to the following year if a vacancy for the County Sheriff, Clerk, or Surrogate posts if the vacancy occurs 70 days before election day. In March 2019 Cardinale expressed his opposition to marijuana legalization. He called the social justice argument in favor of legalization "B.S." as well as saying it wouldn't solve the budget problems that those in favor of legalization have argued.

After Cardinale's death in February 2021, Holly Schepisi won a Republican Party special convention over Robert Auth to fill the vacant senate seat and was sworn in on March 25, 2021.

=== Committee assignments ===
- Commerce
- Judiciary

=== Campaign for Congress ===
After 5th District Congresswoman Marge Roukema announced her retirement in 2002, she endorsed Cardinale as her successor in the Republican primary. However, Cardinale finished with 25%, a close third behind State Assemblyman Scott Garrett (the eventual winner, with 45%) and David C. Russo (who received 26% of votes cast).

== Personal life ==
Cardinale married Carole Petrullo in 1959. They attended the same preschool in Brooklyn, but only reconnected years later when three friends set them up on blind dates. They remained married for 62 years until his death. Together, they had five children: Marisa, Christine, Kara, Gary, and Nicole.

Cardinale died on the morning of February 20, 2021, at the Pascack Valley Medical Center in Westwood, New Jersey. He was 86, and suffered a brief illness prior to his death that was not related to COVID-19. At the time of his death, he was running for re-election to a thirteenth term in the state senate. Cardinale's funeral was on February 24 at Our Lady of Mount Carmel Church in Tenafly, New Jersey. He was buried at Brookside Cemetery in Englewood, New Jersey.

== Electoral history ==
=== 2017 ===
In 2017 Cardinale faced a challenge from Democrat Linda H. Schwager and Libertarian James Tosone. In his second closest election in that district since 1981 he beat Schwager by over 4,000 votes. Cardinale won Bergen, and Passaic Counties by about 4,000 and 2,000 votes respectively.

2017 General Election in the 39th District
Party	Candidate	Votes	%	±%
Republican	Gerald Cardinale (Incumbent)	33,752	52.8%	▼10.8
Democratic	Linda H. Schwager	29,631	46.3%	▲9.9
Libertarian	James Tosone	574	0.9%	▲0.9
Total votes		'63,957'	'100.0%'	

=== 2013 ===
In a year that was good, electorally, for incumbent State Senate Republicans, Cardinale won re-election by over 16,000 votes, and finishing with more than 60% of the vote in Bergen and Passaic Counties.

2013 General Election in the 39th District
Party	Candidate	Votes	%	±%
Republican	Gerald Cardinale (Incumbent)	37,836	63.6%	▲0.1
Democratic	Jane “Jan” Bidwell	21,616	36.4%	▼0.1
Total votes		'59,452'	'100.0%'	

=== 2011 ===
2011 re-redistricting put part of Passaic County in the district. Democrats nominated Lorraine M. Waldes. Cardinale easily defeated Waldes.

2011 General Election in the 39th District
Party	Candidate	Votes	%
Republican	Gerald Cardinale (Incumbent)	28,041	63.5%
Democratic	Lorraine M. Waldes	16,097	36.5%
Total votes		44,138	100.0

=== 2007 ===
In his second closest election since 1981 at that point, Cardinale defeated Democratic nominee Joseph Ariyan by 5,000 votes.

2007 General Election in the 39th District
Party	Candidate	Votes	%	±%
Republican	Gerald Cardinale (Incumbent)	27,623	55.4%	▼6.9
Democratic	Joseph Ariyan	22,272	44.6%	▲6.9
Total votes		'48,895'	'100.0'	

=== 2003 ===
During the 2003 general election in New Jersey Democrats gained a majority in the State Senate for the first time since 1992, however Cardinale still won re-election easily.

2003 General Election in the 39th District
Party	Candidate	Votes	%	±%
Republican	Gerald Cardinale (Incumbent)	30,718	62.3	▼0.6
Democratic	Richard Muti	18,605	37.7	▲1.5
Total votes		'49,323'	'100.0'	

=== 2001 ===
In 2001, Republicans lost two seats in the State Senate making the partisan makeup a 20–20 split. Republicans lost the Governorship with the retirement of Governor Donald DiFrancesco and the election of James McGreevey. Regardless, Cardinale won re-election in the then-safe Republican 39th District.

2001 General Election in the 39th District
Party	Candidate	Votes	%
Republican	Gerald Cardinale (Incumbent)	42,717	62.9
Democratic	Alan Baskin	24,543	36.2
Conservative	George E. Soroka	616	0.9
Total votes		67,876	100.0

=== 1997 ===
In 1997 Incumbent Republican Governor Christine Todd Whitman barely squeaked out a re-election win over State Senator and Woodbridge Township Mayor James McGreevey, Cardinale, who at this point was still serving as Deputy Majority Leader under the leadership of Majority Leader John O. Bennett and Senate President Donald DiFrancesco, cruised to re-election.

1997 General Election in the 39th District
Party	Candidate	Votes	%	±%
Republican	Gerald Cardinale (Incumbent)	46,424	66.3	▲3.8
Democratic	Ilan Plawker	22,466	32.1	▼5.4
Conservative	Michael W. Koontz	1,166	1.7	N/A
Total votes		'70,056'	'100.0'	

=== 1993 ===
Cardinale who was serving as Majority Whip easily beat Democratic nominee Stephen Jaffe.

1993 General Election in the 39th District
Party	Candidate	Votes	%	±%
Republican	Gerald Cardinale (Incumbent)	48,803	62.5	▼4.4
Democratic	Stephen H. Jaffe	29,268	37.5	▲4.4
Total votes		'78,071'	'100.0'	

=== 1991 ===
In the 1991 election, Republicans gained an overwhelming Majority in the State Senate. Cardinale was made Majority Whip following the election.

1991 General Election in the 39th District
Party	Candidate	Votes	%
Republican	Gerald Cardinale (Incumbent)	37,135	66.9
Democratic	Mary Donohue	18,336	33.1
Total votes		55,471	100.0

=== 1987 ===
Cardinale easily won re-election to a third term in 1987.

1987 General Election in the 39th District
Party	Candidate	Votes	%	±%
Republican	Gerald Cardinale (Incumbent)	31,585	67.1	▲15.9
Democratic	Louis B. Redisch	15,499	32.9	▼15.9
Total votes		'47,084'	'100.0'	

=== 1983 ===
In what was Cardinale's closest election since 1981 he faced now former State Senator Francis X. Herbert, who lost by a little under 2,000 votes.

1983 General Election in the 39th District
Party	Candidate	Votes	%	±%
Republican	Gerald Cardinale (Incumbent)	27,199	51.2	▼7.0
Democratic	Francis X. Herbert	25,942	48.8	▲7.0
Total votes		'53,141'	'100.0'	

=== 1981 ===
Then an Assemblyman, Cardinale ran for State Senate for the first time against incumbent Democratic State Senator Frank Herbert, Cardinale beat him by a wide margin.

1981 General Election in the 39th District
Party	Candidate	Votes	%
Republican	Gerald Cardinale	38,929	58.2
Democratic	Francis X. Herbert (Incumbent)	27,948	41.8
Total votes		66,877	100.0

=== 1979 ===
In 1979 Cardinale, again ran for General Assembly this time he won coming in first place.

1979 General Election in the 39th District
Party	Candidate	Votes	%	±%
Republican	Gerald Cardinale	27,608	28.1	▲4.8
Republican	John W. Markert	27,450	28.0	▲4.7
Democratic	Greta Kiernan (Incumbent)	21,425	21.8	▼4.2
Democratic	Harold Martin (Incumbent)	20,577	21.0	▼5.1
Libertarian	Henry Koch	809	0.8	▲0.2
U.S. Labor	Elliot Greenspan	308	0.3	0.0
Total votes		'98,177'	'100.0'	

=== 1977 ===
In 1977 Cardinale ran for General Assembly losing to Incumbent Harold Martin and newcomer Greta Kiernan.

1977 General Election in the 39th District
Party	Candidate	Votes	%	±%
Democratic	Harold Martin	28,105	26.1	▲0.7
Democratic	Greta Kiernan	28,026	26.0	▲1.1
Republican	Gerald Cardinale	25,087	23.3	▼1.9
Republican	John F. Inganamort	25,041	23.3	▼1.2
Libertarian	Henry Koch	681	0.6	N/A
Libertarian	William J. Zelko, Jr.	432	0.4	N/A
U.S. Labor	Elliot Greenspan	276	0.3	N/A
Total votes		'107,648'	'100.0'	

=== United States House of Representatives ===
2002 Republican Primary - United States House of Representatives 5th District
Party	Candidate	Votes	%
Republican	Scott Garrett	16,234	44.9%
Republican	David C. Russo	9,229	25.7%
Republican	Gerald Cardinale	9,109	25.5
Republican	Akram Yosri Abdelrahman	773	2.1
Republican	Brian Fox	665	1.8

=== New Jersey Governor ===
1989 Republican gubernatorial primary
Party	Candidate	Votes	%
Republican	James A. Courter	112,326	29.0%
Republican	W. Cary Edwards	85,313	22.0%
Republican	Chuck Hardwick	82.392	21.2%
Republican	William Gormley	66,430	17.1%
Republican	Gerald Cardinale	32,250	8.3%
Republican	Tom Blomquist	3,791	0.9%
Republican	Lois Rand	2,553	0.6%

New Jersey General Assembly
Preceded by Greta Kiernan; Harold Martin	Member of the New Jersey General Assembly from the 39th district January 8, 1980–January 12, 1982; Served alongside: John Markert	Succeeded by Joan M. Wright
New Jersey Senate
Preceded by Frank Herbert	Member of the New Jersey Senate from the 39th district January 12, 1982–February 20, 2021	Succeeded by Holly Schepisi
