= Westwood Junior High School =

Westwood Junior High School may refer to:

- Westwood Jr./Sr. High School - Westwood Regional School District - Washington Township, New Jersey

Westwood Junior High School - Richardson Independent School District - Dallas, Texas

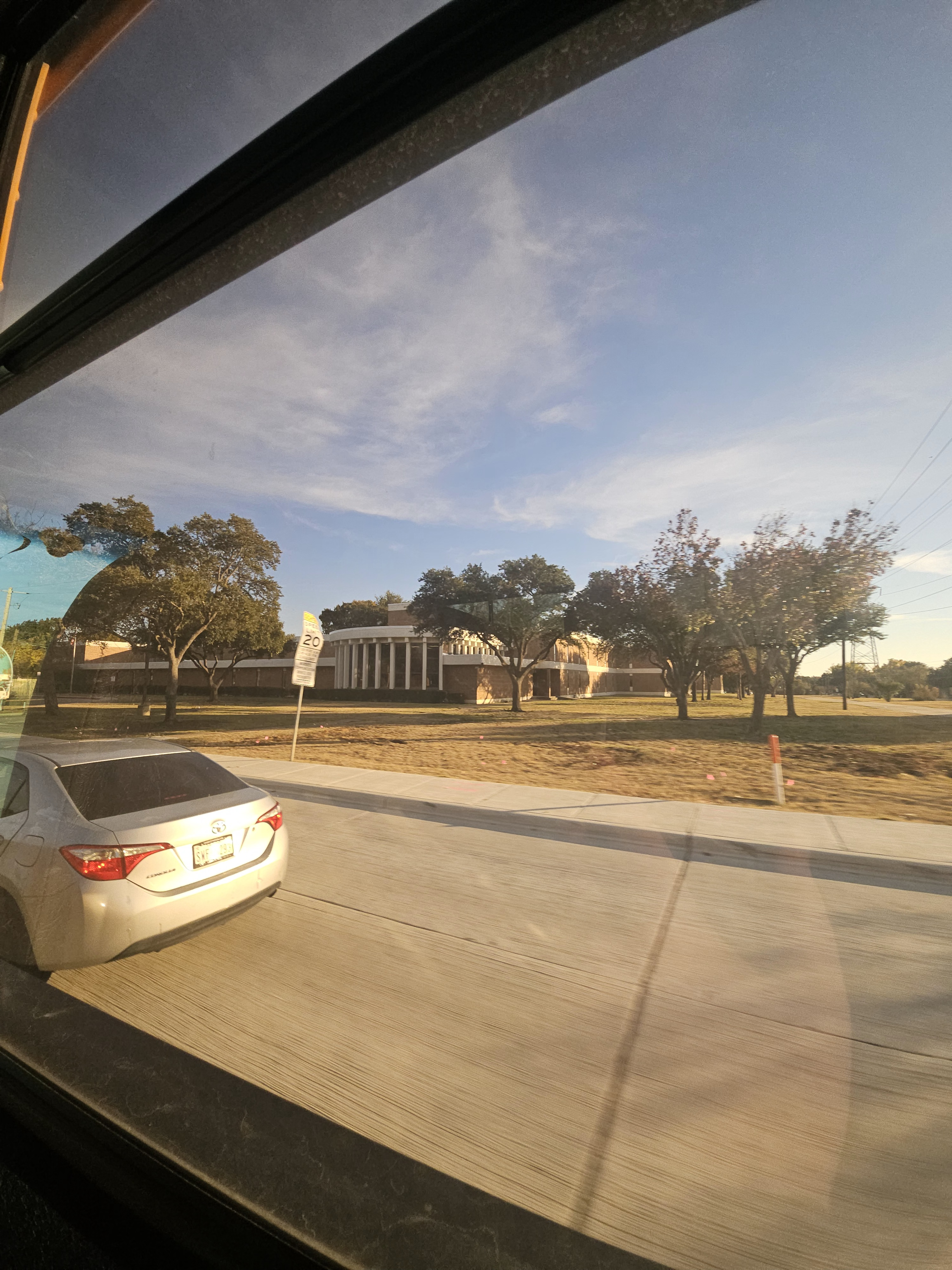
Westwood Jr High

- Westwood Junior High School - Westwood Independent School District - Palestine, Texas
