= Kevin Sampson (American football) =

American football player (born 1981)

No. 79
- Position: Offensive tackle

Personal information
- Born: June 19, 1981 (age 45); Westwood, New Jersey, U.S.
- Listed height: 6 ft 4 in (1.93 m)
- Listed weight: 312 lb (142 kg)

Career information
- High school: Washington (NJ) Westwood
- College: Syracuse
- NFL draft: 2004: 7th round, 231th overall pick

Career history
- Kansas City Chiefs (2004–2006); Carolina Panthers (2007)*; Washington Redskins (2007)
- * Offseason or practice squad member only

Career NFL statistics
- Games played: 16
- Games started: 7
- Fumble recoveries: 1
- Stats at Pro Football Reference

Kevin M. Sampson (born June 19, 1981) is an American former professional football player who was a tackle in the National Football League (NFL). He was selected by the Kansas City Chiefs in the seventh round of the 2004 NFL draft. He played college football for the Syracuse Orange. Sampson was also a member of the Carolina Panthers practice squad and of the Washington Redskins.

== Early life ==
Sampson was a standout football player and wrestler at Westwood Regional High School in Washington Township, New Jersey. As a football player, he was a three-time All-League, two-time All-County, All-Regional and All-State selection. He also played in the New Jersey Governors Bowl.

== College career ==
Sampson played on the Syracuse football team for four years. In his freshman year, he started one game and played in six. During his Sophomore year, Sampson played in all 13 games that were scheduled but started in none. As a Junior, Sampson started all twelve games of the season, on what finished as a 4–8 team. During his Senior year, the record of the football team improved to 6-6 and Sampson started in every game. Overall, he played in 44 games (24 starts) for Syracuse University, blocking for a 1,000-yard rusher all four years.

== Professional career ==
=== Kansas City Chiefs ===
Sampson debuted for the Chiefs during the 2004 season, during which he played in six games. In the next season, (2005) he made an appearance in four games and started in one. During the 2006 NFL season, Sampson played in six games and started in all of them.

== Health issues ==
On Thursday, October 4, 2005, Sampson suffered a seizure at 10:00 AM. Less than one week after coming off of his first start in the NFL, he was rushed into the emergency room, where he faded in and out of consciousness. Sampson fully recovered and went on to play football later in the season.
