= Reuven Ben-Yosef =

Israeli poet (1937–2001)

- ראובן בן יוסף
- Born: Robert Eliot Reiss; 31 May 1937; New York City, U.S.
- Died: 9 March 2001 (aged 63); Israel
- Occupations: Poet, writer
- Spouse: Yehudit Ben-Yosef
- Children: 3
- Writing career
- Notable works: The Endless Seed, Letters to America: Selected Poems of Reuven Ben-Yosef
- Notable awards: Jewish Book Council of America (1969, 1975); Moznaim Prize (1978); N.Y.U. Neuman Prize (1979); Peter Shiprert Prize (1982); Bar-Ilan University Prize (1986); Keren Hayasod Prize (1990); Prime Minister Levi Eshkol Prize (1996–97)

Reuven Ben-Yosef (Hebrew: ראובן בן יוסף; 1937–2001) was an Israeli poet.

== Biography ==
Ben-Yosef was born Robert Eliot Reiss, the son of Joseph and Cecilia Reiss, in New York City on May 31, 1937.

His childhood was spent in Manhattan, where he attended P.S. 187 and later, The High School of Music & Art, where he became a professional jazz musician. He went on to complete his secondary education at Westwood High School in New Jersey and attended Oberlin College in Ohio before serving in the U.S. Army in Heilbronn, Germany.

During 1957–59 he published poetry in American literary magazines and The New York Times.

Before he left America to emigrate to Israel he published his first book of poetry, the last he wrote in English, The Endless Seed.

During the Yom Kippur War he was with the first military units to launch the counter-offensive in the southern sector of the Golan Heights and was on front-line duty for 145 days.

In the summer of 1976 he moved to Jerusalem. He supported his family by translating and teaching creative writing to high-school students.

When the Lebanon War broke out in 1982, he was again called to duty and sent to the front for 41 days.

In 1996 he started a small publishing house called Sifre Bitzaron.

He died of lung cancer on March 9, 2001. He left his brother James Reiss, his sister Lucinda Luvaas, his wife, Yehudit, three children and seven grandchildren.

He wrote 19 books of Hebrew poetry, two novels, two books of essays, and a writer's diary. After his death, his wife published a book, In Memory of Reuven Ben-Yosef, which included critical articles by his colleagues (2002).

In 2015 Syracuse University Press published Letters to America: Selected Poems of Reuven Ben-Yosef, edited and translated by Michael Weingrad.

== Reviews ==
"Reuven Ben-Yosef left English and America behind to remake himself as a Hebrew poet in Israel. Now Michael Weingrad has returned him to us, in an English translation that captures the passion, pride, and angry beauty of his verse. Ben-Yosef's meditations on Jewish life in Israel and America—an opposition that split his own family—offer a powerful and unfashionable, counterpoint to the American Jewish literature that was produced to such acclaim during his lifetime. He offers a unique and challenging response to the question of what it means to be a Jewish poet."—Adam Kirsch, senior editor, The New Republic

"Michael Weingrad's Letters to America offers readers an exceptionally thoughtful introduction to the work of a complicated man. Reuven Ben-Yosef was an American and an Israeli, a soldier and a poet, a utopian and a skeptic, and Weingrad's sensitive essay and his intelligent translations included in the volume make the man and his work come alive."—Adam Rovner, author of In the Shadow of Zion: Promised Lands before Israel

== Awards ==
- Twice awarded The Jewish Book Council of America (1969, 1975)
- Moznaim Prize (1978)
- N.Y.U. Neuman Prize (1979)
- Peter Shiprert Prize (1982)
- Bar-Ilan University Prize (1986)
- Keren Hayasod Prize (1990)
- Prime Minister Levi Eshcol Prize (1996–97)

== Poems, stories, essays in periodicals ==
Molad, Moznaim, Amot, Apirion, 77, Bitzaron, Mibifnim, Maariv, Yediot, Haaretz, Davar, Al-Hamishmar, Ariel, Nativ, Psifas, Afikim and others and in the United States literary magazines such as Midstream, which recently published an article by the poet Esther Cameron and some of his poems translated into English.
