= Raymond E. Johns Jr. =

United States Air Force general

Raymond E. Johns, Jr.
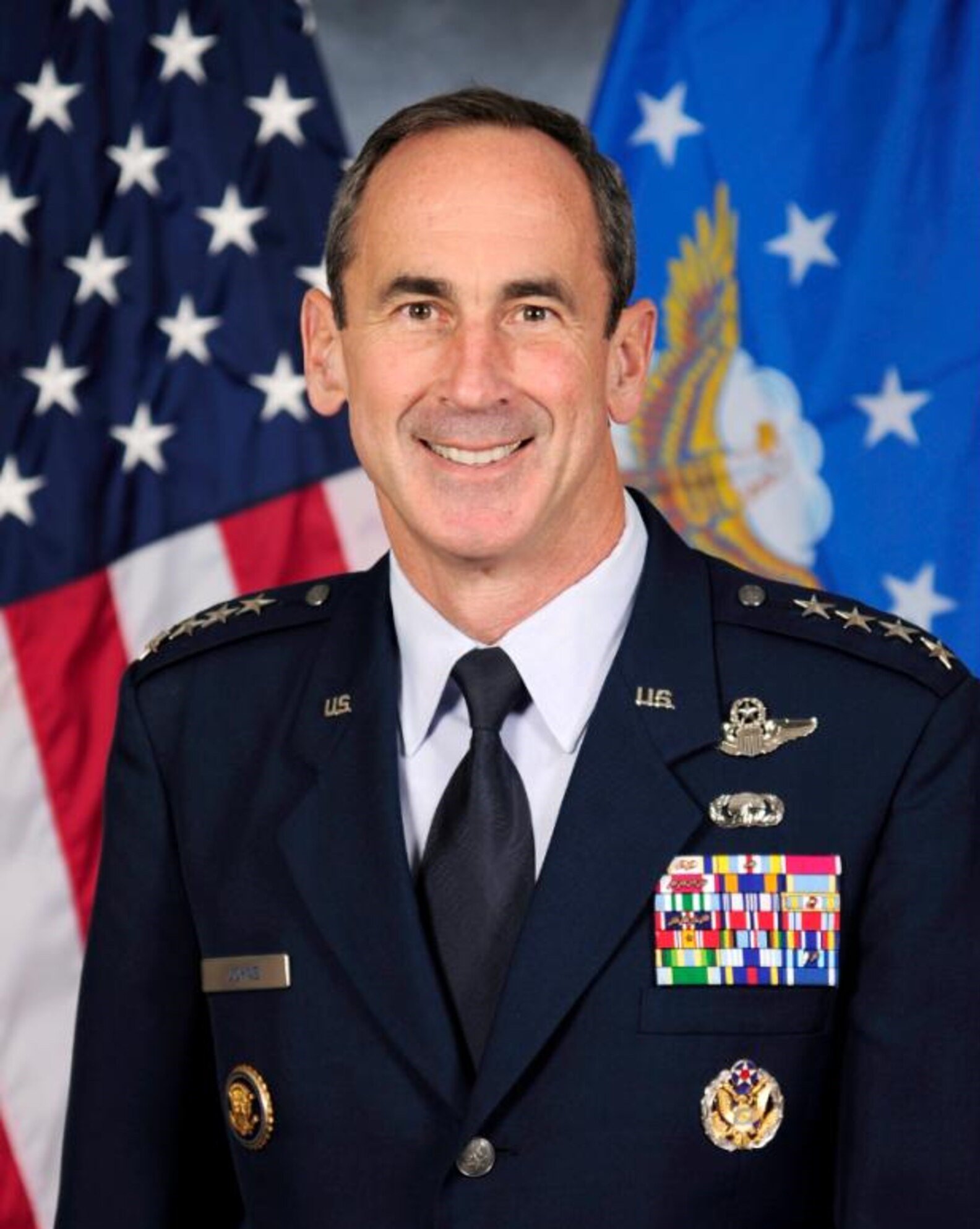
- General Raymond E. Johns, Jr.
- Born: December 7, 1954 (age 71); New Jersey, U.S.
- Military career
- Allegiance: United States
- Branch: United States Air Force
- Service years: 1977–2013
- Rank: General
- Commands: Air Mobility Command; 62nd Airlift Wing; 60th Operations Group; 4953rd Test Squadron
- Awards: Air Force Distinguished Service Medal (3); Defense Superior Service Medal (2); Legion of Merit

General Raymond Edward Johns Jr. (born December 7, 1954) is a retired United States Air Force officer who served as Commander, Air Mobility Command.

== Military career ==
Johns graduated from the United States Air Force Academy in 1977. His aviation career includes Northrop T-38 Talon and Lockheed C-141 Starlifter instructor pilot, as well as the chief test pilot and test program manager for the Boeing VC-25 Air Force One Replacement Program. He was chosen as a White House Fellow in 1991 where he was a senior staff member in the Office of National Service. The general has served at Headquarters United States European Command in security assistance and congressional affairs, and at Headquarters United States Pacific Command as Deputy Director of Strategic Plans and Policy. Within Headquarters United States Air Force, he served as Deputy Director and, later, Director of Air Force Programs. The general commanded a test squadron, operations group and airlift wing, and he was the Director of Mobility Forces for operations in Bosnia.

Johns served as the Air Force's Deputy Chief of Staff for Strategic Plans and Programs from October 2006 to November 16, 2009. Johns led Air Mobility Command's mission to provide rapid, global mobility and sustainment for America's armed forces. The command also plays a crucial role in providing humanitarian support at home and around the world. The men and women of AMC – active duty, Air National Guard, Air Force Reserve and civilians – provide airlift, aerial refueling, special air mission and aeromedical evacuation. Johns retired with an effective date of January 1, 2013. He currently serves as the Senior Vice President for Government Business, Flight Safety International at the National Commission on the Structure of the Air Force.

Johns is a command pilot and experimental test pilot with 4,500 flying hours in a variety of aircraft.

== Education ==
Johns grew up in Washington Township, Bergen County, New Jersey and attended Westwood Regional High School.

In 1977, Johns earned a Bachelor of Science in aeronautical engineering from the United States Air Force Academy in Colorado Springs, Colorado. He graduated from Squadron Officer School, Maxwell AFB, Alabama in 1982. In 1988, he completed a Master of Science in Administration from Central Michigan University. He has also received education and training at the Air Command and Staff College; the U.S. Air Force Test Pilot School at Edwards AFB in California; the Defense Systems Management College; the Industrial College of the Armed Forces at Fort Lesley J. McNair in Washington, D.C.; the National Security Management Course at Syracuse University; and the Program for Senior Executives in National and International Security Management at Harvard University's John F. Kennedy School of Government.

== Assignments ==
Johns began his undergraduate pilot training at Williams Air Force Base (AFB) in Arizona in June 1977. He completed the training in February 1979. Over the next three years, he served as an instructor pilot, academic instructor, class commander, and assistant wing executive officer. He left Williams AFB in June 1982 for McGuire AFB in New Jersey, where he served as squadron executive officer.

In August 1984, Johns moved to Washington, D.C. as an Air Staff Training Program officer with the Air Force Issues Team, part of the Office of the Vice Chief of Staff at U.S. Air Force Headquarters. For the next year, he was enrolled in the U.S. Air Force Test Pilot School at Edwards AFB in California. Upon completion in June 1985, he moved to Wright-Patterson AFB in Ohio, where he was an N/K/C-135A/E experimental test pilot for Air Force One, a position he held for five years. In May 1990, while still in Ohio, he became Commander of the 4953rd Test Squadron for the C-141, T-39, T-37 and Commercial Aircraft Derivative Testing.

In 1991, he received a White House Fellowship and spent one year with the Office of National Service and National Security Council in Washington, DC. After completing the program, he enrolled in the Industrial College of the Armed Forces at Fort Lesley J. McNair. His next appointment took him overseas to the U.S. European Command Headquarters in Stuttgart, Germany; he served as Chief of Security Assistance, Plans, Policy and Training Branch and as Logistics and Security Assistance Directorate. The following year, while still stationed in Germany, he served as Chief of Strategy, Congressional and Resources, Plans and Policy Directorate, and spent two months as U.S. Lead in a United Nations peacekeeping mission in Liberia.

In July 1995, Johns returned to the U.S. to serve as Senior Director of the Tanker Airlift Control Center at Scott AFB in Illinois. This was followed by a two year assignment as Commander of the 60th Operations Group out of Travis AFB in California, during which time he served as Director of Mobility Forces in Operation Joint Endeavor in Bosnia from October 1996 through January 1997. He then served as Commander of the 62nd Airlift Wing at McChord AFB in Washington State from August 1998 to July 2000, then transferred to U.S. Pacific Command Headquarters at Camp H.M. Smith in Hawaii, serving as Deputy Director of Strategic Plans and Policy until August 2002.

He returned to the Office of the Deputy Chief of Staff for Strategic Plans and Programs at U.S. Air Force Headquarters in Washington, D.C in August 2002. There he served as Deputy Director of Programs until July 2004, then Director of Programs until October 2006, then subsequently Deputy Chief of Staff for Strategic Plans and Programs until 2009. For the final four years of his career, he served as Commander of Air Mobility Command at Scott AFB in Illinois.

== Flight information ==
Johns is rated as a Command pilot and experimental test pilot with 4,500 flight hours. He has flown: C-17, C-141, T-38, VC-25 (Air Force One), N/K/C-135, KC-10 and C-5.

== Major awards and decorations ==
Command Pilot badge
Basic Acquisition and Financial Management Badge
Presidential Service Badge
Headquarters Air Force Badge

Air Force Distinguished Service Medal with two bronze oak leaf clusters
Defense Superior Service Medal with oak leaf cluster
Legion of Merit
Meritorious Service Medal with four oak leaf cluster
Air Medal
Aerial Achievement Medal
Joint Service Commendation Medal
Air Force Achievement Medal
Joint Meritorious Unit Award with bronze oak leaf cluster
Air Force Outstanding Unit Award with four oak leaf clusters
Air Force Organizational Excellence Award
Combat Readiness Medal
National Defense Service Medal with bronze service star
Armed Forces Expeditionary Medal
Global War on Terrorism Service Medal
Armed Forces Service Medal
Air Force Overseas Long Tour Service Ribbon
Air Force Longevity Service Award with silver and two bronze oak leaf clusters
Small Arms Expert Marksmanship Ribbon
Air Force Training Ribbon
NATO Medal for Former Yugoslavia

== Promotion dates ==
Rank	Date
Second Lieutenant	June 1, 1977
First Lieutenant	June 1, 1979
Captain	June 1, 1981
Major	May 1, 1986
Lieutenant Colonel	April 1, 1990
Colonel	February 1, 1994
Brigadier General	March 1, 2001
Major General	August 1, 2004
Lieutenant General	October 10, 2006
General	November 20, 2009

Military offices
Preceded by Arthur Lichte	Commander of Air Mobility Command; 2009–2012	Succeeded by Paul J. Selva
