= Eastwood, New Jersey =

Borough in Bergen County, New Jersey

Coordinates: 40.995°N 74.006°W

Eastwood (June 6, 1894 – March 20, 1896) was a borough that existed for a brief period of time in Bergen County, New Jersey, United States. It was formed at the height of the "boroughitis" fever that led to the creation of 26 new municipalities in the county during 1894.

Eastwood was formed largely from a portion of Washington Township in what is now the southern half of present-day River Vale, with a small section of what is now Westwood and bits of Harrington Township, New Jersey that are now in Harrington Park and Old Tappan, with a center on the intersection of CR 53 and CR 110. As stated in History of Bergen County, New Jersey, "Eastwood caught the borough fever in March, 1894, and was organized as a borough, but in a short time it became tired of borough life and returned to Washington township from which it was set off." Eastwood's demise made it the only borough in Bergen County to be dissolved after its creation.

Old Tappan gained portions from Harrington Township circa 1896 of what had been Eastwood. When River Vale was incorporated in 1906, it included area that had been part of the Borough of Eastwood.

== Sources ==
- History of Bergen County, New Jersey, 1630–1923; by Westervelt, Frances A., 1858–1942.
- Municipal Incorporations of the State of New Jersey (according to Counties) prepared by the Division of Local Government, Department of the Treasury (New Jersey); December 1, 1958.
