= Washington Township, Bergen County, New Jersey =

Township in Bergen County, New Jersey, US

Washington Township, New Jersey
- Township
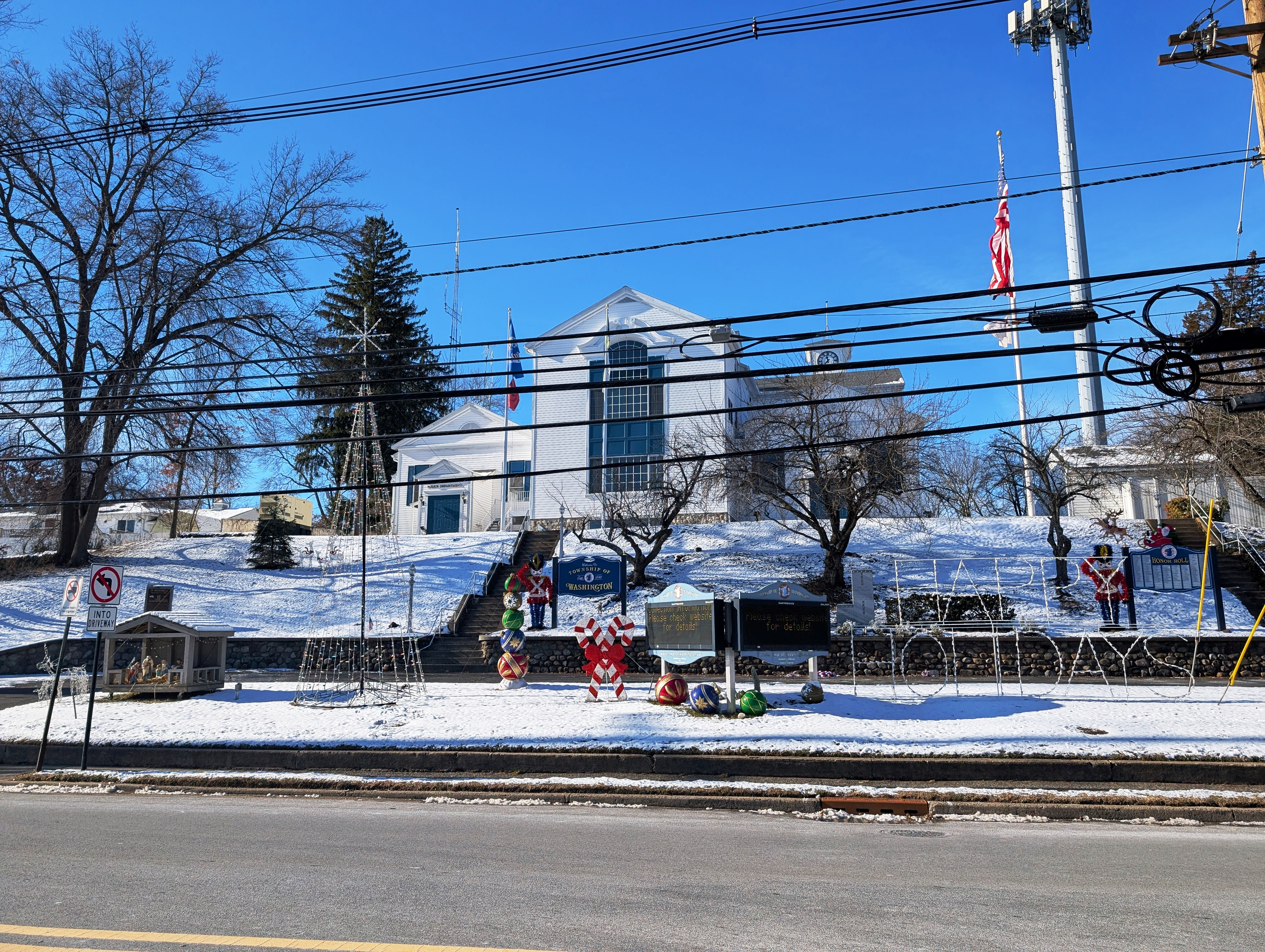
- Township of Washington Municipal Building

- Seal

- Location of Washington Township in Bergen County highlighted in red (left). Inset map: Location of Bergen County in New Jersey highlighted in orange (right).

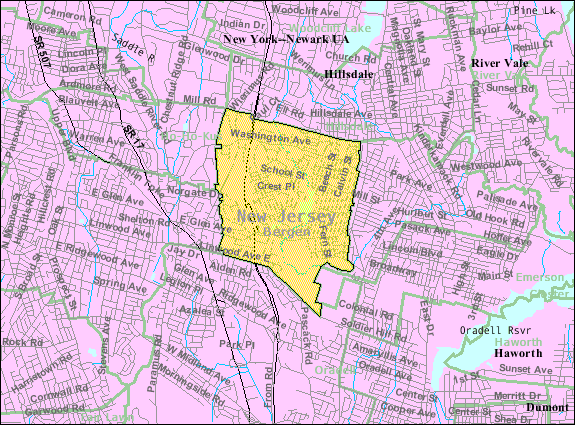
- Census Bureau map of the Township of Washington, Bergen County, New Jersey

- Location in Bergen County Location in New Jersey Location in the United States
- Coordinates: 40.988306°N 74.064693°W
- Country: United States
- State: New Jersey
- County: Bergen
- Incorporated: April 13, 1840
- Named for: George Washington

Government
  - Type: Faulkner Act (mayor–council)
  - Body: Township Council
  - Mayor: Peter Calamari (R, term ends December 31, 2025)
  - Administrator: Mark DiCarlo
  - Municipal clerk: Susan Witkowski

Area
  - Total: 3.00 sq mi (7.78 km^{2})
  - Land: 2.95 sq mi (7.65 km^{2})
  - Water: 0.050 sq mi (0.13 km^{2}) 1.67%
  - Rank: 334th of 565 in state 26th of 70 in county
- Elevation: 89 ft (27 m)

Population (2020)
  - Total: 9,285
  - Estimate (2023): 9,263
  - Rank: 256th of 565 in state 43rd of 70 in county
  - Density: 3,144.3/sq mi (1,214.0/km^{2})
  - Rank: 212th of 565 in state 44th of 70 in county
- Time zone: UTC−05:00 (Eastern (EST))
  - Summer (DST): UTC−04:00 (Eastern (EDT))
- ZIP Code: 07676
- Area code: 201
- FIPS code: 3400377135
- GNIS feature ID: 0882311
- Website: www.twpofwashington.us

Washington Township is a township in Bergen County, in the U.S. state of New Jersey. As of the 2020 United States census, the township's population was 9,285, an increase of 183 (+2.0%) of the 2010 census count of 9,102, reflecting an increase of 164 (+1.8%) from the 8,938 counted in the 2000 census.

== History ==
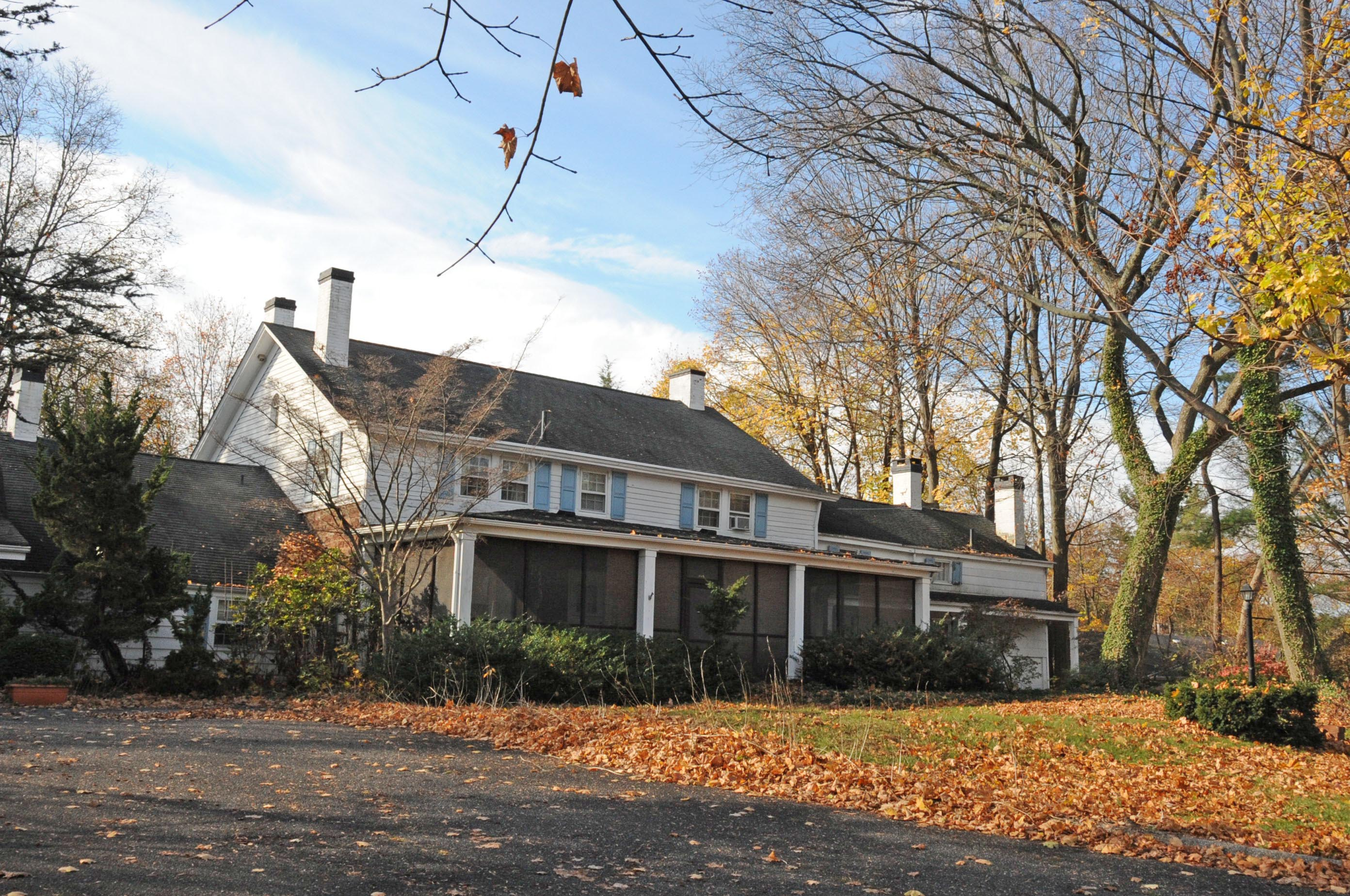
Seven Chimneys, built 1745–1750, is the oldest house in Washington Township and third oldest in Bergen County. Seven Chimneys was used as a stop for the Underground Railroad.

The Lenape Native Americans first inhabited the township and many names throughout the general area were passed down from the Lenape. Pascack and Kinderkamack are just two of these names. However, after Dutch and other European settlers began arriving in the 16th and 17th centuries, the Lenape population was decimated. It is estimated that by 1750, 90% of the Lenape population in and around present-day New Jersey was killed by European settlement through war and European diseases.

Washington Township was created by an act of the New Jersey Legislature on April 13, 1840, from the territories between the Hackensack River and Saddle River that had been part of Harrington Township. At the time of its creation, the township encompassed an area of 19,525 acre, more than 30 square miles (78 km^{2}). The township was named for George Washington, one of more than ten communities statewide named for the first president. It is one of five municipalities in the state of New Jersey with the name "Washington Township". Another municipality, Washington Borough, is completely surrounded by Washington Township, Warren County.

Growth in the area exploded after the Civil War with the completion of the New Jersey and New York Railway through the Pascack Valley, as communities were established near the railroad's stations.

Orvil Township was created on January 1, 1886, from the western portion of The Township of Washington and the southern portion of Hohokus Township.

The Borough Act resulted in a flurry of new boroughs created from portions of the township in 1894 as the "Boroughitis" phenomenon swept through the Township of Washington, with Westwood (May 8, 1894), Park Ridge (May 14, 1894), Eastwood (part; created June 6, 1894, borough lasted until 1896), Montvale (part; created August 31, 1894) and Woodcliff (part; created August 31, 1894, name changed to Woodcliff Lake in 1910) formed among the 26 boroughs created that year in the county. Hillsdale Township (now a borough) was created on March 25, 1898. Etna Borough, which ultimately became Emerson, was formed on April 8, 1903. River Vale (part) was the last to leave when it was created on April 30, 1906. The departures have taken the township from over 30 square miles (78 km^{2}) to its current 3-square-mile (7.8 km^{2}) size.

Seven Chimneys is a house with the described seven chimneys, located on Ridgewood Road atop a small hill. George Washington is said to have stayed at the house during the Revolutionary War. Seven Chimneys, the oldest house in the township, is an impressive example of eighteenth-century, regional, domestic architecture and is an important remnant of the community's early settlement period. The house is listed on the State Register and National Register of Historic Places. Notable visitors include Theodore Roosevelt. The house was used as a stop on the Underground Railroad during the Civil War. On November 3, 1968, the Bergen County Historical Society placed a historic-site marker on the property and was placed on the National Register of Historic Places in 1971.

During the mid-1950s, the completion of the 173-mile (278 km) Garden State Parkway split the township in two. The Parkway created two access routes with Exit 166 on the southern border closest to Paramus and Exit 168 on Washington Avenue. The northernmost toll plaza was built off of East Glen. During the decade after the Parkway was completed, the township dramatically increased in population.

Efforts to gain a ZIP Code for the township back to the mid-1970s, when efforts were made to have the unused 07676 code allocated to the Township of Washington. Previously, the township had been served by the Westwood post office as ZIP Code 07675, which also served Old Tappan, River Vale and Woodcliff Lake. ZIP Code 07676 for Township of Washington was established effective July 2000.

== Geography ==
According to the United States Census Bureau, the township had a total area of 3.00 square miles (7.8 km^{2}), including 2.95 square miles (7.6 km^{2}) of land and 0.05 square miles (0.13 km^{2}) of water (1.67%).

The township is located in the northern portion of Bergen County, which in turn is in the far northeastern corner of New Jersey, 15 miles (24 km) northwest of New York City. It is within the Hackensack River watershed, which comprises Musquapsink Brook, Schlegel Lake, Pascack Brook, Oradell Reservoir, Woodcliff Lake Reservoir, and Lake Tappan. The township borders the Bergen County municipalities of Emerson, Hillsdale, Ho-Ho-Kus, Paramus, Ridgewood, Saddle River and Westwood.

Located within the Pascack Valley of north-central Bergen County, elevations rise gradually in an east to west/south to north trajectory, and range anywhere from 50 feet (15 m) or less in the wooded swamplands behind Westwood Regional High School to approximately 360 feet (110 m) just west of Van Emburgh Avenue. Three hills are in the township: at the border of Westwood, west of Pascack Road, and another located west of Van Emburgh Avenue. Being higher in elevation, it is slightly cooler and less prone to flooding than the rest of the valley and other parts of northwestern Bergen County.

The southern end of the township bordering Emerson and Paramus is wooded wetlands at the convergence of Musquapsink Brook and three cemeteries, and has consistently the densest overnight and morning fog in the area.

As of 2026, the township is a member of Local Leaders for Responsible Planning in order to address the township's Mount Laurel doctrine-based housing obligations.

== Demographics ==
Historical population
Census	Pop.	Note	%±
1840	1,833		—
1850	1,807		−1.4%
1860	2,273		25.8%
1870	2,514		10.6%
1880	2,853		13.5%
1890	2,942	*	3.1%
1900	782	*	−73.4%
1910	100	*	−87.2%
1920	194		94.0%
1930	402		107.2%
1940	491		22.1%
1950	1,208		146.0%
1960	6,654		450.8%
1970	10,577		59.0%
1980	9,550		−9.7%
1990	9,245		−3.2%
2000	8,938		−3.3%
2010	9,102		1.8%
2020	9,285		2.0%
2023 (est.)	9,263		−0.2%
Population sources: 1840–1920; 1840 1850–1870 1850; 1870 1880–1890 1910–1930; 1900–2020 2000; 2010 2020 * = Lost territory in previous decade.

=== 2020 census ===
Washington township, Bergen County, New Jersey – Racial and ethnic composition Note: the US Census treats Hispanic/Latino as an ethnic category. This table excludes Latinos from the racial categories and assigns them to a separate category. Hispanics/Latinos may be of any race.
Race / Ethnicity (NH = Non-Hispanic)	Pop 2000	Pop 2010	Pop 2020	% 2000	% 2010	% 2020
White alone (NH)	7,981	7,839	7,585	89.29%	86.12%	81.69%
Black or African American alone (NH)	78	93	87	0.87%	1.02%	0.94%
Native American or Alaska Native alone (NH)	3	0	8	0.03%	0.00%	0.09%
Asian alone (NH)	496	581	566	5.55%	6.38%	6.10%
Native Hawaiian or Pacific Islander alone (NH)	0	1	0	0.00%	0.01%	0.00%
Other race alone (NH)	17	9	27	0.19%	0.10%	0.29%
Mixed race or Multiracial (NH)	64	84	212	0.72%	0.92%	2.28%
Hispanic or Latino (any race)	299	495	800	3.35%	5.44%	8.62%
Total	8,938	9,102	9,285	100.00%	100.00%	100.00%

=== 2010 Census ===
The 2010 United States census counted 9,102 people, 3,261 households, and 2,632 families in the township. The population density was 3,128.8 people per square mile (1,208.0 people/km^{2}). There were 3,341 housing units at an average density of 1,148.5 units per square mile (443.4 units/km^{2}). The racial makeup was 90.50% (8,237) White, 1.08% (98) Black or African American, 0.01% (1) Native American, 6.47% (589) Asian, 0.02% (2) Pacific Islander, 0.62% (56) from other races, and 1.31% (119) from two or more races. Hispanic or Latino of any race were 5.44% (495) of the population.

Of the 3,261 households, 33.1% had children under the age of 18; 71.0% were married couples living together; 7.3% had a female householder with no husband present and 19.3% were non-families. Of all households, 16.9% were made up of individuals and 11.4% had someone living alone who was 65 years of age or older. The average household size was 2.79 and the average family size was 3.15.

22.9% of the population were under the age of 18, 5.8% from 18 to 24, 21.2% from 25 to 44, 30.1% from 45 to 64, and 19.9% who were 65 years of age or older. The median age was 45.1 years. For every 100 females, the population had 91.7 males. For every 100 females ages 18 and older there were 90.7 males.

The Census Bureau's 2006–2010 American Community Survey showed that (in 2010 inflation-adjusted dollars) median household income was $117,394 (with a margin of error of +/− $14,960) and the median family income was $133,191 (+/− $10,285). Males had a median income of $91,038 (+/− $11,435) versus $56,599 (+/− $4,609) for females. The per capita income for the township was $48,415 (+/− $4,855). About 1.6% of families and 2.0% of the population were below the poverty line, including 1.8% of those under age 18 and 0.6% of those age 65 or over.

Same-sex couples headed 27 households in 2010, an increase from the 10 counted in 2000.

=== 2000 Census ===
As of the 2000 United States census there were 8,938 people, 3,219 households, and 2,687 families residing in the township. The population density was 3,071.1 inhabitants per square mile (1,185.8/km^{2}). There were 3,245 housing units at an average density of 1,115.0 units per square mile (430.5 units/km^{2}). The racial makeup of the township was 92.07% White, 0.98% African American, 0.04% Native American, 5.57% Asian, 0.44% from other races, and 0.90% from two or more races. Hispanic or Latino of any race were 3.35% of the population.

There were 3,219 households, out of which 33.9% had children under the age of 18 living with them, 74.2% were married couples living together, 7.0% had a female householder with no husband present, and 16.5% were non-families. 14.5% of all households were made up of individuals, and 7.7% had someone living alone who was 65 years of age or older. The average household size was 2.77 and the average family size was 3.07.

In the township, the population was spread out, with 22.7% under the age of 18, 4.8% from 18 to 24, 27.7% from 25 to 44, 27.8% from 45 to 64, and 16.9% who were 65 years of age or older. The median age was 42 years. For every 100 females, there were 92.3 males. For every 100 females age 18 and over, there were 89.9 males.

The median income for a household in the township was $83,694, and the median income for a family was $88,017. Males had a median income of $67,090 versus $41,699 for females. The per capita income for the township was $39,248. About 1.5% of families and 2.4% of the population were below the poverty line, including 2.5% of those under age 18 and 3.0% of those age 65 or over.

== Economy ==
Washington Town Center is a shopping mall located in the center of the township on Pascack Road. The privately held Washington Town Center is the township's single largest taxpayer. Through a quirk in the town's tax code, the not-for-profit Washington Township Recreation Club remains the township's second-largest taxpayer.

== Parks and recreation ==
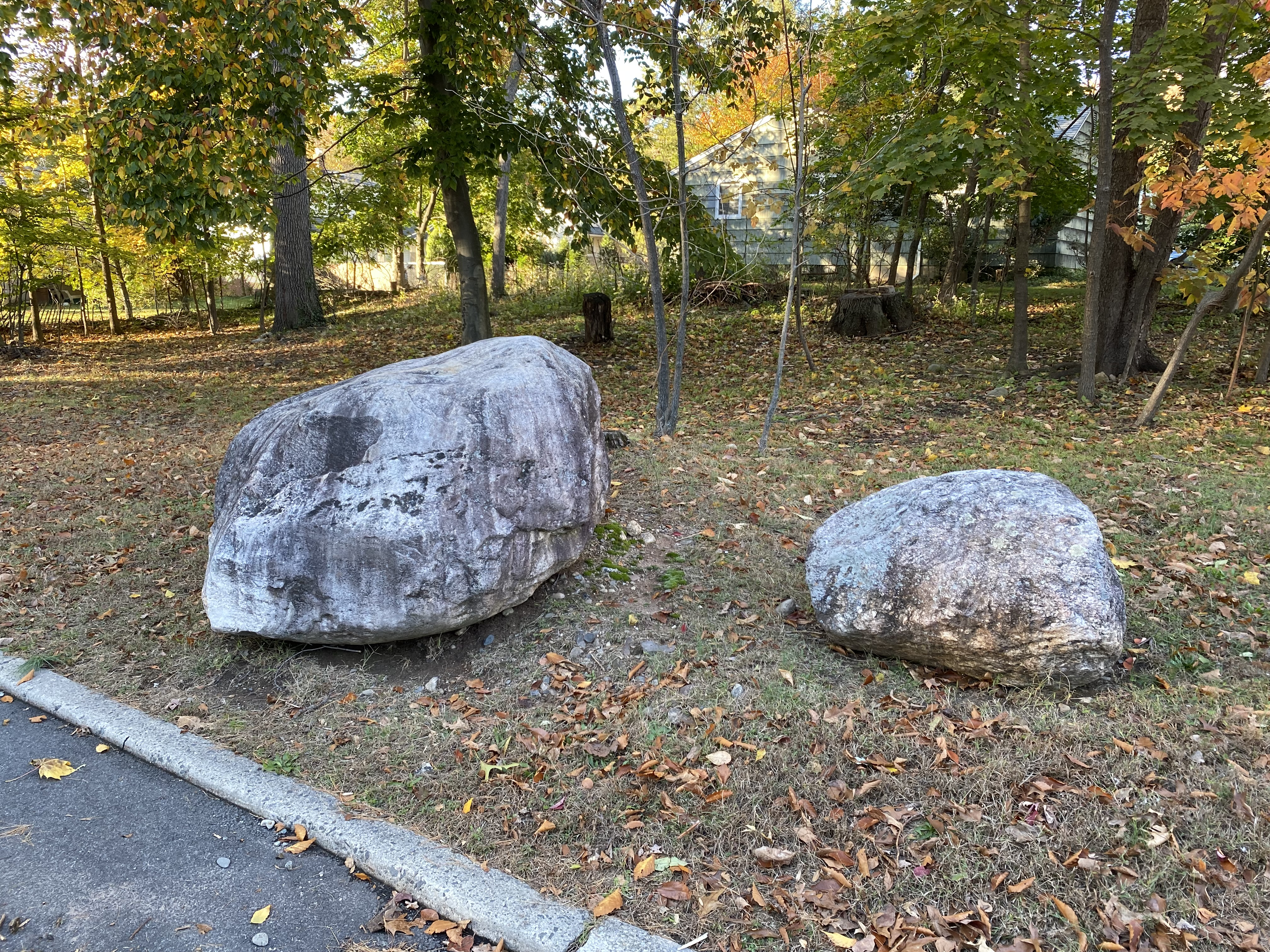
Big Rock and Little Rock, two small boulders at a public park

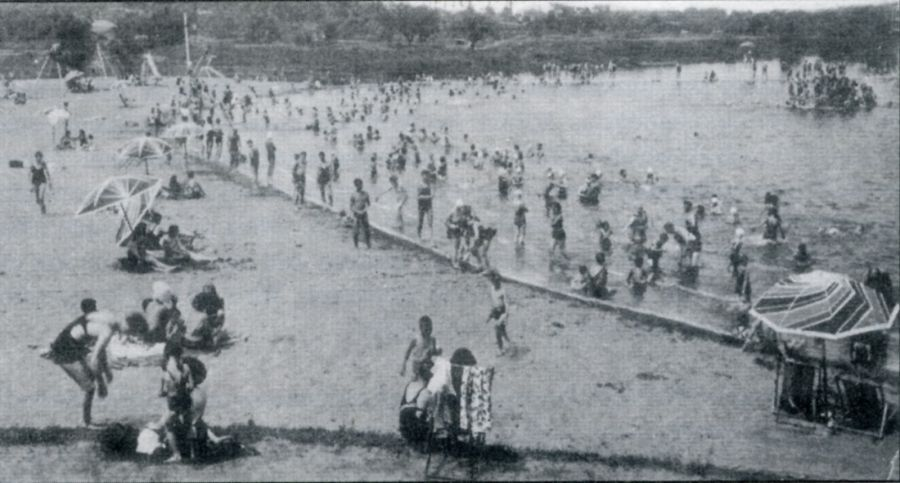
Pine Lake was a popular resort destination in the early to mid 1900s.

The Township of Washington offers various sports activities—baseball, softball, football, cheerleading, and soccer—which are played at the numerous parks and fields throughout the town. Clark Field includes a little league baseball field with two large dugouts and electronic scoreboard, a basketball court, a playground, sandbox, and a concession stand. The playground has many slides, monkey bars, games, gliders, fire poles, regular swings, baby swings, and a tire swing. Memorial Field is in the major recreation site in the township and provides facilities for multiple uses: baseball, softball, soccer and youth football. Adjacent to the Washington Elementary School, it also includes a recreation building with concession stand and a covered picnic pavilion. Other fields include Sherry Field which is close to the border of Westwood and township and offers a baseball field with two playing areas. The other field is Gardener Field which is a baseball field and also a playground. Both of these fields include a concession stand.

As the township does not provide for any recreational pool service, the Washington Township Recreation Club (WTRC) fills this void. Membership at the Washington Township Recreation Club, more commonly known as the 'swim club' or 'pool', is not limited to township residents and is open to any individual or family who wishes to join. In addition to the Olympic sized outdoor pool, the WTRC also offers a game room and picnic area. Additional recreational facilities include the Bethany Community Center which took over the 10-acre (4.0 ha) campus of the YJCC in 2017, including its 80,000-square-foot (7,400 m^{2}) building, offering fitness programs, indoor swimming and a variety of classes for all denominations. The town also has a privately owned Racquet and Health Club.

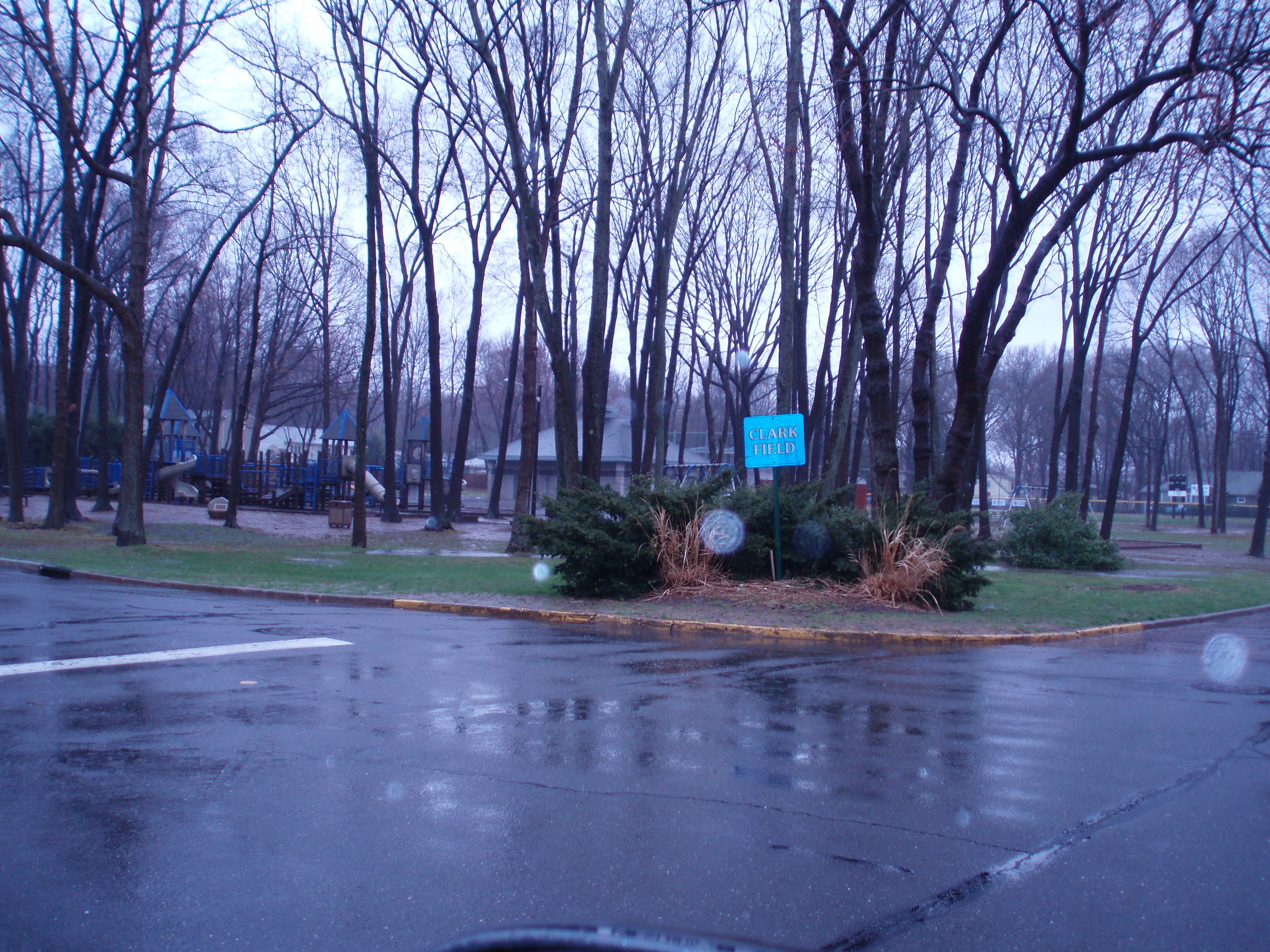
Clark Field

Schlegel Lake, once referred to as Schlegel's Pond and commonly referred to as Washington Lake, is a 28-acre (110,000 m^{2}) artificial body of water privately owned and managed by the Washington Lake Association (WLA) since 1947, whose members have exclusive rights to use of the pond and surrounding property. WLA members may enjoy fishing, boating, picnicking, nature observation and other outdoor activities.

== Government ==
=== Local government ===
The Township of Washington is governed within the Faulkner Act (formally known as the Optional Municipal Charter Law) under the Mayor-Council system of municipal government (Plan E), implemented based on the recommendations of a Charter Study Commission as of January 1, 1970. The township is one of 71 municipalities (of the 564) statewide that use this form of government. The governing body is comprised of a mayor and a five-member Township Council, all of whom are elected at-large on a partisan basis to four-year terms of office, as part of the November general election. Members of the Township Council are elected to serve four-year terms of office on a staggered basis, with three seats up for election together and the other two seats (along with the mayor) up for election two years later in odd-numbered years.

As of 2023, the Mayor of the Township of Washington is Republican Peter Calamari, whose term of office ends December 31, 2025. Members of the Township Council are Council President Desserie Morgan (R, 2023), Council Vice President Steven Cascio (R, 2023), Stacey Feeney (R, 2023), Tom Sears (R, 2025) and Daisy Velez (R, 2025).

=== Federal, state and county representation ===
The Township of Washington is located in the 5th Congressional District and is part of New Jersey's 39th state legislative district.

For the 119th United States Congress, New Jersey's 5th congressional district is represented by Josh Gottheimer (D, Wyckoff). New Jersey is represented in the United States Senate by Democrats Cory Booker (Newark, term ends 2027) and Andy Kim (Moorestown, term ends 2031).

For the 2026–2027 session, the 39th legislative district of the New Jersey Legislature is represented in the State Senate by Holly Schepisi (R, River Vale) and in the General Assembly by Robert Auth (R, Old Tappan) and John V. Azzariti (R, Saddle River).

Bergen County is governed by a directly elected County Executive, with legislative functions performed by a Board of County Commissioners comprised of seven members who are elected at-large to three-year terms in partisan elections on a staggered basis, with either two or three seats coming up for election each November; a Chairman and Vice Chairman are selected from among its seven members at a reorganization meeting held every January. As of 2025, the county executive is James J. Tedesco III (D, Paramus), whose four-year term of office ends December 31, 2026.

Bergen County's Commissioners are Chair Mary J. Amoroso (D, Mahwah, 2025), Vice Chair Steven A. Tanelli (D, North Arlington, 2027), Chair Pro Tem Joan Voss (D, Fort Lee, 2026), Rafael Marte (D, Bergenfield, 2026), Germaine M. Ortiz (D, Emerson, 2025), Thomas J. Sullivan Jr. (D, Montvale, 2025) and Tracy Silna Zur (D, Franklin Lakes, 2027).

Bergen County's elected constitutional officials are Clerk John S. Hogan (D, Northvale, 2026), Sheriff Anthony Cureton (D, Englewood, 2027) and Surrogate Michael R. Dressler (D, Cresskill, 2026).

=== Politics ===
As of March 2011, there were a total of 6,381 registered voters in the Township of Washington, of which 1,364 (21.4% vs. 31.7% countywide) were registered as Democrats, 2,412 (37.8% vs. 21.1%) were registered as Republicans and 2,601 (40.8% vs. 47.1%) were registered as Unaffiliated. There were 4 voters registered as Libertarians or Greens. Among the township's 2010 Census population, 70.1% (vs. 57.1% in Bergen County) were registered to vote, including 91.0% of those ages 18 and over (vs. 73.7% countywide).

Gubernatorial election results for Washington Township
Year	Republican		Democratic		Third party(ies)	
Year	No.	%	No.	%	No.	%
2025	2,707	56.51%	2,069	43.19%	14	0.29%
2021	2,394	59.79%	1,588	39.66%	22	0.55%
2017	1,730	55.99%	1,311	42.43%	49	1.59%
2013	2,079	69.32%	889	29.64%	31	1.03%
2009	2,329	57.88%	1,475	36.66%	220	5.47%
2005	1,870	55.72%	1,410	42.01%	76	2.26%

In the 2016 presidential election, Republican Donald Trump received 3,036 votes (56.1% vs. 41.1% countywide), ahead of Democrat Hillary Clinton with 2,184 votes (40.3% vs. 54.2%) and other candidates with 196 votes (3.6% vs. 4.6%), among the 5,484 ballots cast by the township's 7,010 registered voters, for a turnout of 78.2% (vs. 72.5% in Bergen County). In the 2012 presidential election, Republican Mitt Romney received 2,883 votes (58.3% vs. 43.5% countywide), ahead of Democrat Barack Obama with 2,000 votes (40.5% vs. 54.8%) and other candidates with 33 votes (0.7% vs. 0.9%), among the 4,941 ballots cast by the township's 6,619 registered voters, for a turnout of 74.6% (vs. 70.4% in Bergen County). In the 2008 presidential election, Republican John McCain received 3,146 votes (58.1% vs. 44.5% countywide), ahead of Democrat Barack Obama with 2,159 votes (39.8% vs. 53.9%) and other candidates with 42 votes (0.8% vs. 0.8%), among the 5,418 ballots cast by the township's 6,735 registered voters, for a turnout of 80.4% (vs. 76.8% in Bergen County). In the 2004 presidential election, Republican George W. Bush received 3,207 votes (59.6% vs. 47.2% countywide), ahead of Democrat John Kerry with 2,137 votes (39.7% vs. 51.7%) and other candidates with 27 votes (0.5% vs. 0.7%), among the 5,379 ballots cast by the township's 6,582 registered voters, for a turnout of 81.7% (vs. 76.9% in the whole county).

United States presidential election results for Washington Township 2024 2020 2016 2012 2008 2004
Year	Republican		Democratic		Third party(ies)	
Year	No.	%	No.	%	No.	%
2024	3,364	57.36%	2,380	40.58%	121	2.06%
2020	3,317	52.73%	2,910	46.26%	63	1.00%
2016	3,036	56.06%	2,184	40.32%	196	3.62%
2012	2,883	58.65%	2,000	40.68%	33	0.67%
2008	3,146	58.84%	2,159	40.38%	42	0.79%
2004	3,207	59.71%	2,137	39.79%	27	0.50%

In the 2013 gubernatorial election, Republican Chris Christie received 69.3% of the vote (2,079 cast), ahead of Democrat Barbara Buono with 29.6% (889 votes), and other candidates with 1.0% (31 votes), among the 3,067 ballots cast by the township's 6,527 registered voters (68 ballots were spoiled), for a turnout of 47.0%. In the 2009 gubernatorial election, Republican Chris Christie received 2,329 votes (56.7% vs. 45.8% countywide), ahead of Democrat Jon Corzine with 1,475 votes (35.9% vs. 48.0%), Independent Chris Daggett with 200 votes (4.9% vs. 4.7%) and other candidates with 20 votes (0.5% vs. 0.5%), among the 4,110 ballots cast by the township's 6,623 registered voters, yielding a 62.1% turnout (vs. 50.0% in the county).

United States Senate election results for Washington Township1
Year	Republican		Democratic		Third party(ies)	
Year	No.	%	No.	%	No.	%
2024	3,117	56.25%	2,302	41.54%	122	2.20%
2018	2,195	57.39%	1,528	39.95%	102	2.67%
2012	2,514	56.71%	1,872	42.23%	47	1.06%
2006	1,996	58.76%	1,368	40.27%	33	0.97%

United States Senate election results for Washington Township2
Year	Republican		Democratic		Third party(ies)	
Year	No.	%	No.	%	No.	%
2020	3,264	52.74%	2,860	46.21%	65	1.05%
2014	1,426	55.68%	1,100	42.95%	35	1.37%
2013	1,097	56.84%	825	42.75%	8	0.41%
2008	2,754	56.85%	2,024	41.78%	66	1.36%

== Education ==
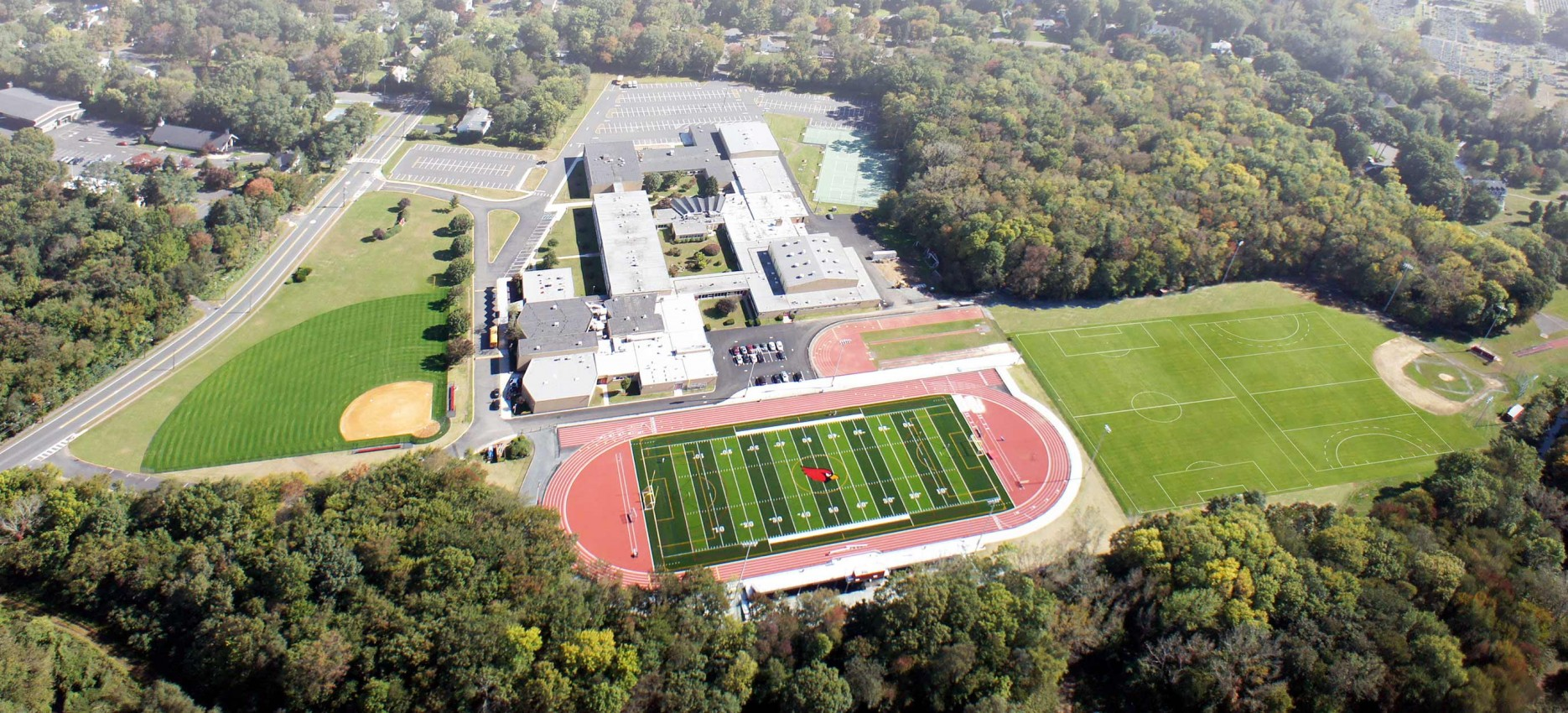
Aerial view of Westwood Regional High School.

Public school students in kindergarten through twelfth grade attend the Westwood Regional School District, a comprehensive regional school district serving students from both the Township of Washington and Westwood Borough. The district is the county's only regional district serving grades K-12. As of the 2023–24 school year, the district, comprised of six schools, had an enrollment of 2,828 students and 259.2 classroom teachers (on an FTE basis), for a student–teacher ratio of 10.9:1. Schools in the district (with 2023–24 enrollment data from the National Center for Education Statistics) are Berkeley Avenue Elementary School with 282 students in grades K–5, Brookside Elementary School with 375 students in grades K–5, Jessie F. George Elementary School with 283 students in grades K–5, Washington Elementary School with 322 students in grades K–5, Westwood Regional Middle School with 683 students in grades 6–8 and Westwood Regional High School with 839 students in grades 9–12. Seats on the nine-member board are allocated based on population of the constituent municipalities, with five allocated to Westwood and four to Washington Township.

Public school students from the township, and all of Bergen County, are eligible to attend the secondary education programs offered by the Bergen County Technical Schools, which include the Bergen County Academies in Hackensack, and the Bergen Tech campus in Teterboro or Bergen Tech campus in Paramus. The district offers programs on a shared-time or full-time basis, with admission based on a selective application process and tuition covered by the student's home school district.

Immaculate Heart Academy is a parochial, college preparatory, all-girls Catholic high school located on Van Emburgh Avenue, operating under the auspices of the Roman Catholic Archdiocese of Newark. The school was founded in 1960 as the first all-girls school operated by the Newark Archdiocese.

== Emergency services ==
The Washington Township Volunteer Fire Department was founded in 1934. The station is located at 656 Washington Avenue and is home to Rescue 40, Tower Ladder 41, Engine 43, and Engine 44.

The Washington Township Volunteer Ambulance Corps was founded in 1957. The station is located at 354 Hudson Avenue and is home to Ambulance 4–6.

The Washington Township Police Department was founded in 1934. The station is located at 350 Hudson Avenue in the municipal complex.

== Transportation ==
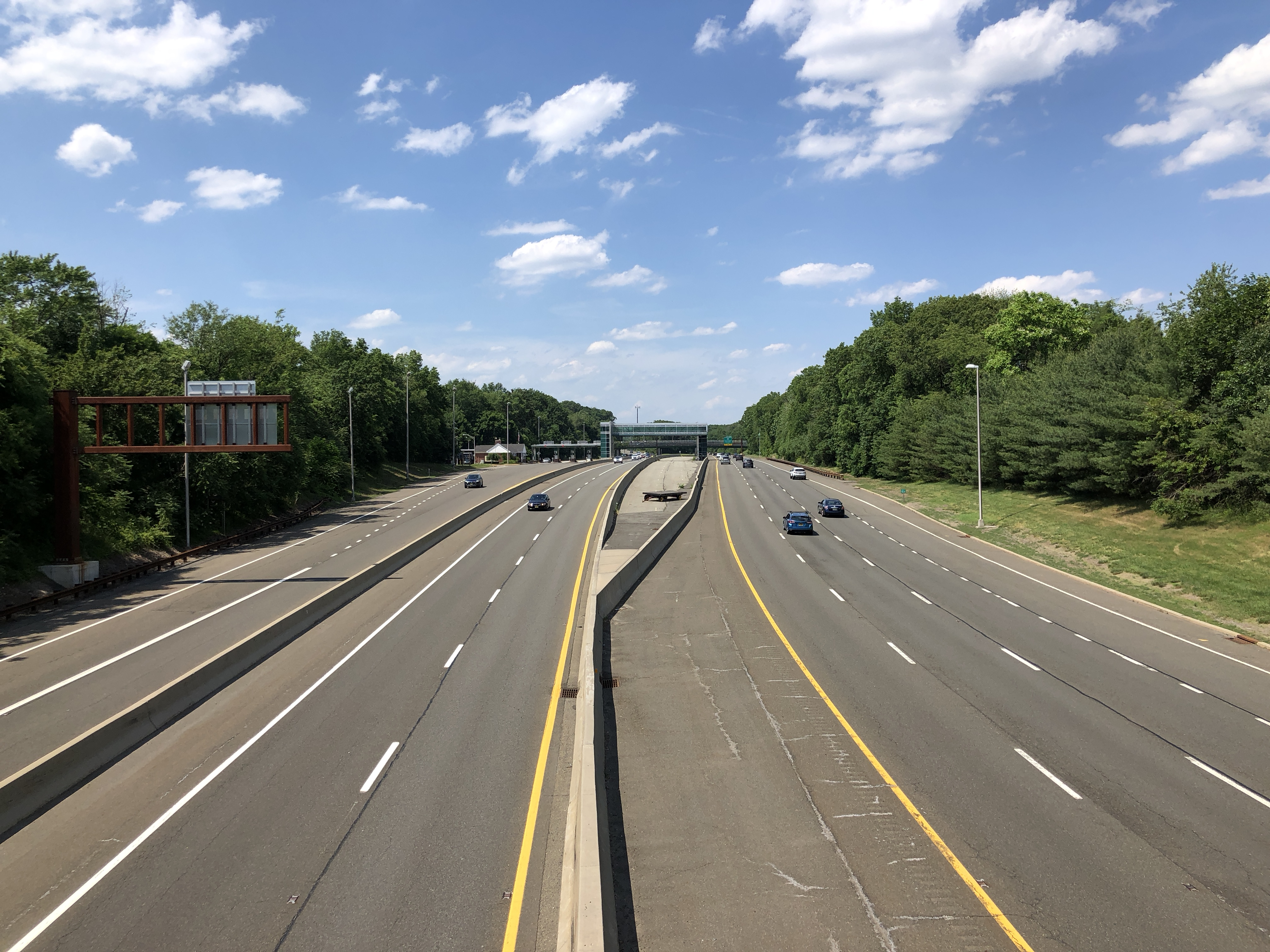
View north along the Garden State Parkway in Washington Township

=== Roads and highways ===
As of May 2010, the township had a total of 43.48 miles (69.97 km) of roadways, of which 34.76 miles (55.94 km) were maintained by the municipality, 6.90 miles (11.10 km) by Bergen County and 1.82 miles (2.93 km) by the New Jersey Turnpike Authority.

Located within the New York metropolitan area's arterial network, the township is easily accessible by car. The Garden State Parkway serves the Township with exits 166 (south) and 168 (north). The Parkway's final tool booth, the Pascack toll, is located in the township. County Route 502 also travels through the township. Route 17 is accessible nearby.

=== Public transportation ===
NJ Transit bus route 165 serves nearby Westwood with access to and from the Township of Washington to the Port Authority Bus Terminal in Midtown Manhattan and local service on the 752 route. Westwood train station can also be easily accessed from the township.

Rockland Coaches provides express service from Pascack Road and Washington Avenue via Garden State Parkway Exit 168, with weekday rush-hour service provided to the Port Authority Bus Terminal in Midtown Manhattan, heading to New York in the morning and returning to the township weekday evenings on routes 46, 47 and 49.

== Entertainment ==
The Township of Washington had a movie theater in the Washington Township Shopping Center, with three viewing screens. It closed in 2016 as Bowtie Cinemas, but reopened shortly thereafter as an independent cinema. On July 31, 2025, the theater closed down for good.

== Community ==
The Township of Washington has its own TV station, Washington Community Television (WCTV), run entirely by volunteers. The non-profit, community access group is funded by cable franchise fees and provides a 24/7 electronic bulletin board telecast over several cable systems in surrounding towns. WCTV provides live programming and coverage of high school sports, local events and activities on the Public, educational, and government access (PEG) cable TV channels as well as the Internet. Its volunteers have been honored for their efforts. Town Meetings are broadcast live and are archived on the WCTVNJ YouTube pages.

The Township of Washington Public Library offers a collection of 48,325 volumes with a circulation of over 80,000 items per year. It is a member of the Bergen County Cooperative Library System. In addition to traditional materials, the library offers an online collection and specialty items not typically found in a library setting, including technology, housewares and hobby equipment. Laura Rifkin is the current Library Director.

As the township does not provide residential trash pickup service, residents must pay for trash pickup services through a choice of two private garbage companies.

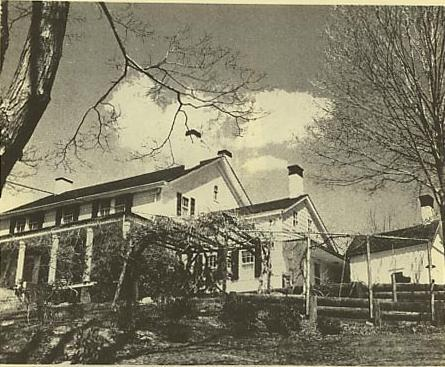
Seven Chimneys National Historic Site

== Notable people ==
People who were born in, residents of, or otherwise closely associated with the Township of Washington include:

- Beverly Bower (1925–2002), operatic soprano
- Carol Higgins Clark (1956–2023), mystery writer
- Robert Dow (born 1945), fencer who competed in the team saber event at the 1972 Summer Olympics
- Thomas Fitzpatrick (1940–2009), pilot known for two intoxicated flights where he flew from New Jersey and landed on the streets of New York City
- Damon Harrison (born 1988), defensive tackle for the New York Giants
- Mary Higgins Clark (1927–2020), best-selling author of suspense novels
- Raymond E. Johns Jr. (born 1955), General, Commander Air Mobility Command, United States Air Force
- Pert Kelton (1907–1968), vaudeville, movie, radio and television actress, who originated the role of Alice Kramden in The Honeymooners with Jackie Gleason
- John Markert (1929–2011), politician who served as Mayor of the Township of Washington before being elected to the New Jersey General Assembly, where he served three terms representing the 39th Legislative District
- Miriam Moskowitz (1916–2018), schoolteacher who served two years in prison after being convicted for conspiracy as an atomic spy for the Soviet Union
- Jeffrey Nordling (born 1962), actor who has appeared in the series Dirt
- B. J. Raji (born 1986), former NFL nose tackle who played for the Green Bay Packers
- Corey Raji (born 1988), professional basketball player
- Bob Schroeder (born 1960), member of the New Jersey General Assembly and former councilmember in the Township of Washington, who was sentenced in 2017 to eight years in state prison for deception, misconduct and passing bad checks
- Vito Trause (1925–2019), World War II United States Army veteran and prisoner of war

== Sources ==
- Municipal Incorporations of the State of New Jersey (according to Counties) prepared by the Division of Local Government, Department of the Treasury (New Jersey); December 1, 1958
- Clayton, W. Woodford; and Nelson, William. History of Bergen and Passaic Counties, New Jersey, with Biographical Sketches of Many of its Pioneers and Prominent Men., Philadelphia: Everts and Peck, 1882.
- Harvey, Cornelius Burnham (ed.), Genealogical History of Hudson and Bergen Counties, New Jersey. New York: New Jersey Genealogical Publishing Co., 1900.
- Van Valen, James M. History of Bergen County, New Jersey. New York: New Jersey Publishing and Engraving Co., 1900.
- Westervelt, Frances A. (Frances Augusta), 1858–1942, History of Bergen County, New Jersey, 1630–1923, Lewis Historical Publishing Company, 1923.
