= Harrington Township, New Jersey =

Coordinates: 41.003°N 73.958°W

Harrington Township was a township that existed in Bergen County, New Jersey, United States, from 1775 until 1916. It was named after the Harring family, who were early settlers to the region by 1633. The spelling was originally Harington Township, but was changed to Harrington Township in the latter part of the 19th century.

Harrington Township was formed by Royal Charter on June 22, 1775, and was created from the northern portions of both New Barbadoes Township and Hackensack Township. The new township stretched from the Hudson River on the east to the Saddle River in the west, and north to the New York border.

On April 13, 1840, the territories west of the Hackensack River were taken from Harrington Township to form Washington Township.

The passage of a revised Borough Act resulted in the "Boroughitis"-inspired subdivision of the township into new municipalities: Delford (now Oradell) on March 8, 1894; Eastwood (part, borough lasted until 1896 to become part of Old Tappan) on June 6, 1894; Schraalenburgh (now Dumont) on July 20, 1894; and Old Tappan on October 8, 1894. Portions of Harrington Township were taken on April 8, 1903, to form parts of both Demarest and Alpine. The final wave of departures saw the creation of Closter (January 1, 1904), Haworth (February 24, 1904), Harrington Park (March 29, 1904) and Norwood (March 14, 1905).

On March 15, 1916, the remainder of Harrington Township became Northvale. With the creation of Northvale, Harrington Township was dissolved.

== Sources ==
- Westervelt, Frances A. (Frances Augusta), 1858–1942, History of Bergen County, New Jersey, 1630-1923
- Municipal Incorporations of the State of New Jersey (according to Counties) prepared by the Division of Local Government, Department of the Treasury (New Jersey); December 1, 1958.
- The Origin of New Jersey Place Names, by The New Jersey Public Library Commission, 1945
