= Corey Raji =

American-Nigerian basketball player

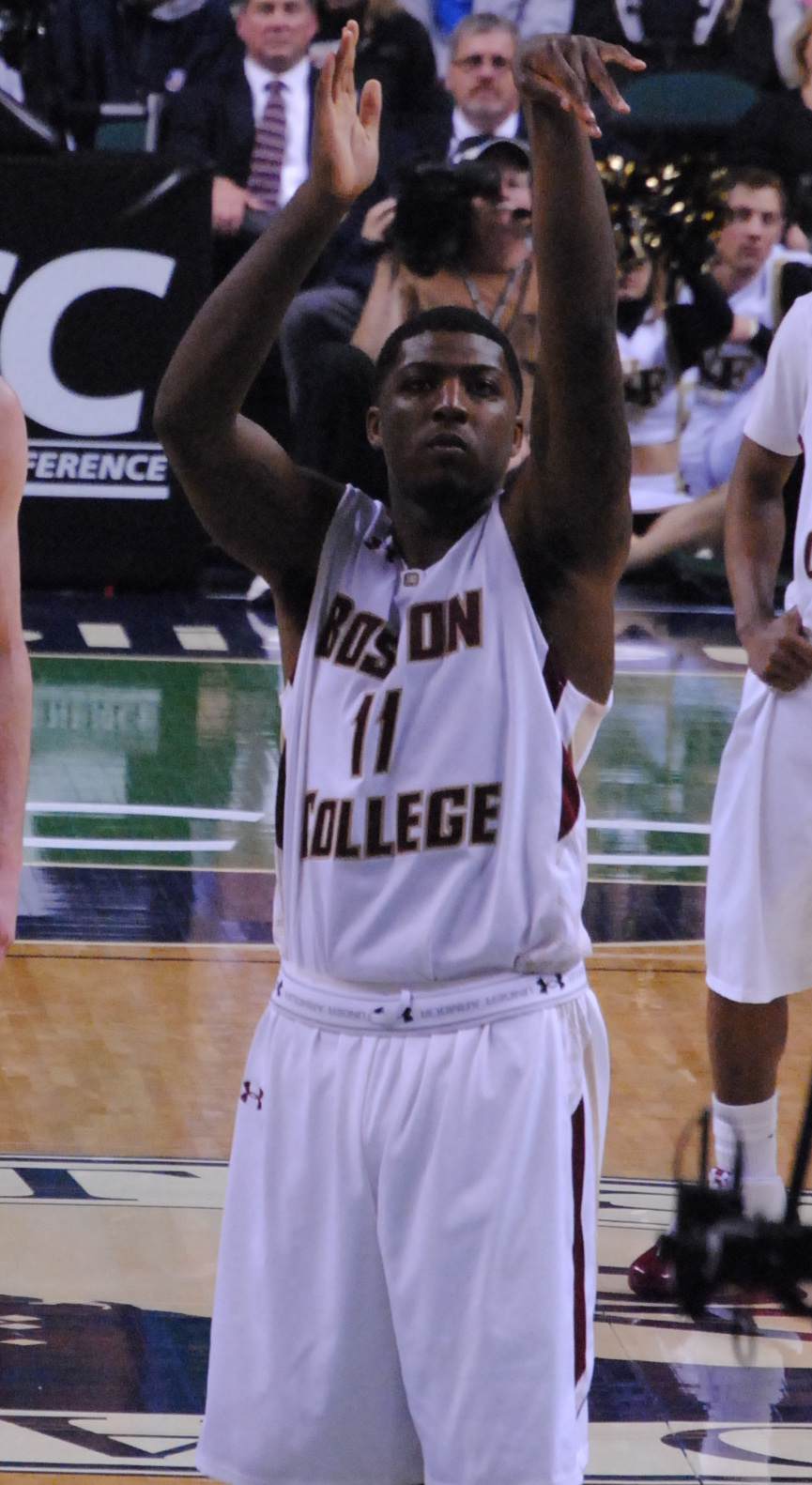

Free agent
- Position: Small forward

Personal information
- Born: November 7, 1988 (age 38) Washington Township, New Jersey
- Listed height: 6 ft 6 in (1.98 m)
- Listed weight: 220 lb (100 kg)

Career information
- High school: Westwood (Washington Township, New Jersey)
- College: Boston College (2007–2011)
- NBA draft: 2011: undrafted
- Playing career: 2011–present

Career history
- 2011–2012: Etzella Ettelbruck
- 2012–2013: Quimper
- 2013: ADA Blois Basket

Corey Raji (born November 7, 1988) is an American-Nigerian professional basketball player. He played college basketball for Boston College.

== High school career ==
Raji attended Westwood Regional High School in Washington Township, New Jersey where he played for head coach Frank Connelly and was a two-time first-team All-Group 2 honoree. As a junior in 2005–06, he averaged 25.7 points and 15.6 rebounds per game.

On November 22, 2006, Raji signed a National Letter of Intent to play college basketball for Boston College.

As a senior in 2006–07, Raji averaged 28.7 points, 16.7 rebounds, 4.4 blocks and 3.4 assists per game and was subsequently named the North Jersey Player of the Year by The Record. He also earned first-team All-State honors from The Star-Ledger. He finished his career as Westwood's career scoring leader with 2,497 points; also recorded 1,757 career rebounds.

== College career ==
In his freshman season, Raji played in all 31 games with six starting assignments while averaging 8.3 points and 4.3 rebounds per game. The Eagles struggled in 2007–08, going 14-17 and missing the NCAA Tournament.

The Eagles were much improved during Raji's second season, thanks in part to the emergence of freshman Reggie Jackson, and made the NCAA Tournament. Raji averaged 9.9 points, 6.1 rebounds and 1.5 assists in 34 games (all starts). Raji scored 15 points in a season-ending loss to USC in the NCAA Tournament.

The Eagles came into Raji's junior season without Tyrese Rice after he graduated, but Reggie Jackson and Rakim Sanders returned along with Raji. Raji and the Eagles both got off to quick starts. Raji scored over 10 points per game in his first ten appearances. Meanwhile, the Eagles won six of their first eight games, recording wins over Michigan, Miami and Providence. The Eagles struggled the rest of the season, however, finishing with a losing record. Raji finished the season with averages of 11.4 points and 5.8 rebounds in 29 games (all starts).

The 2010–11 Eagles entered the season in a state of transition, following a coaching change and the departure of Rakim Sanders to Fairfield University. The season started with a win before losing in an upset to the Yale Bulldogs despite a 12-point performance from Raji. The Eagles more or less neutralized star Greg Mangano, who scored only eight points, but they could only muster 67 points in the loss. BC went on to win nine of their next ten games. Later in the season, Raji scored 22 points in a win over Georgia Tech and 21 points in a win over Wake Forest. The Eagles made the NIT but lost in the second round to the John Shurna-led Northwestern Wildcats. The Eagles finished the season with 20 wins. Raji's senior season was more or less successful. He had career highs in points per game (12.1), rebounds per game (6.7) and three-pointers made (39).

== Professional career ==
In September 2011, Raji signed with Etzella Ettelbruck of Luxembourg for the 2011–12 season.

In 2012, Raji signed with Quimper of the French Nationale 1 league for the 2012–13 season.

In June 2013, Raji signed with ADA Blois Basket also of the French Nationale 1 league for the 2013–14 season. In December 2013, he left Blois after 14 games.

On November 1, 2014, Raji was selected by the Austin Spurs in the fifth round of the 2014 NBA D-League draft. However, he was waived by the Spurs five days later.

== Personal ==
Raji is the son of Busari Sr. and Mamie Raji. His older brother, B. J., was a defensive tackle for the Green Bay Packers and since 2014 has retired from the NFL.
