= Pascack =

Pascack may refer to the following in New Jersey:

- Pascack Brook, a tributary of the Hackensack River
- Pascack Hills High School, in Montvale
- Pascack Press, a weekly newspaper

== See also ==
- Pascack Valley (disambiguation)
