= Westwood Regional High School =

High school in Bergen County, New Jersey, US

Location
- 701 Ridgewood Road; Township of Washington, Bergen County, New Jersey 07676; United States; 40.981009°N 74.062298°W

Information
- Type: Public high school
- Motto: Crescat Scientia (Let knowledge grow from more to more)
- Established: 1967
- School district: Westwood Regional School District
- NCES School ID: 341782000906
- Principal: Frank Connelly
- Faculty: 81.8 FTEs
- Grades: 9-12
- Enrollment: 839 (as of 2023–24)
- Student to teacher ratio: 10.3:1
- Colors: Scarlet; Black and white
- Athletics: 20 teams
- Athletics conference: Big North Conference
- Team name: Cardinals
- Rival: River Dell High School
- Newspaper: The Cardinal Chronicle
- Yearbook: Cardinal Chronicle
- Website: www.wwrsd.org/o/westwood-hs
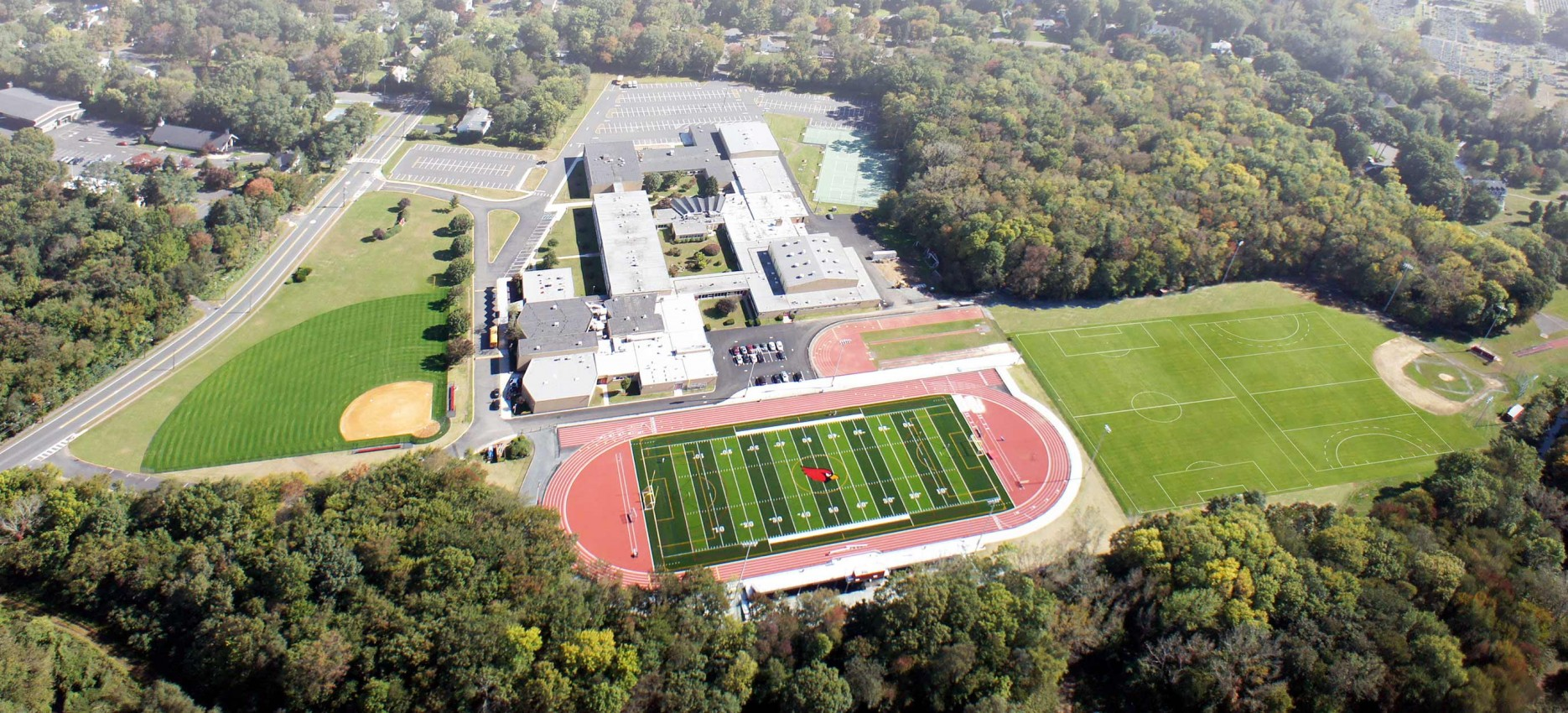
- An aerial view of the school's campus

Westwood Regional High School (formerly Westwood Regional Jr./Sr. High School) is a four-year comprehensive regional public high school that serves students in ninth through twelfth grades from Borough of Westwood and the Township of Washington, in Bergen County, in the U.S. state of New Jersey, operating as the lone secondary school of the Westwood Regional School District. Beginning in the 2019–20 school year, students in eighth grade who had previously attended the then junior-senior high school began attending the new Westwood Middle School.

As of the 2023–24 school year, the school had an enrollment of 839 students and 81.8 classroom teachers (on an FTE basis), for a student–teacher ratio of 10.3:1. There were 79 students (9.4% of enrollment) eligible for free lunch and 18 (2.1% of students) eligible for reduced-cost lunch.

== Awards and recognition ==
The school was the 106th-ranked public high school in New Jersey out of 339 schools statewide in New Jersey Monthly magazine's September 2014 cover story on the state's "Top Public High Schools", using a new ranking methodology. The school had been ranked 58th in the state of 328 schools in 2012, after being ranked 92nd in 2010 out of 322 schools listed. The magazine ranked the school 56th in 2008 out of 316 schools. The school was ranked 81st in the magazine's September 2006 issue, which included 316 schools across the state. Schooldigger.com ranked the school tied for 128th out of 381 public high schools statewide in its 2011 rankings (a decrease of 9 positions from the 2010 ranking) which were based on the combined percentage of students classified as proficient or above proficient on the mathematics (83.8%) and language arts literacy (95.9%) components of the High School Proficiency Assessment (HSPA).

The school has been named as one of the Best Communities for Music Education by the NAMM Foundation for more than 10 years.

== Curriculum ==
A dual enrollment program with Bergen Community College allows students to obtain college credit while fulfilling the high school requirements.

Students may opt to enroll at the Bergen County Technical Schools and split their time between the high school general education coursework and the vocational coursework.

Advanced Placement (AP) courses offered include AP English Language and Composition, AP English Literature and Composition, AP Statistics, AP Calculus AB, AP Calculus BC, AP Computer Science Principles, AP Computer Science A, AP Chemistry, AP Biology, AP Physics 2, AP Physics C: Mechanics AP Environmental Science, AP United States History, AP United States Government & Politics, AP Psychology, AP Spanish, AP French, AP Italian, AP Studio Art, AP Art History.

== Extracurricular activities ==
Students have opportunities to participate in activities that have included as a student exchange program with France and multiple day field trips (previous trips have been to Spain, France, Hawaii, and US National Parks)

Activities and clubs for students to participate in include:

=== Academic Decathlon ===
In 2025, the Westwood Regional High School WACADECA won the NJ State Academic Decathlon competition.

In 2024, the Westwood Regional High School WACADECA (the school's abbreviation for their academic decathlon team) came in 3rd place at the National United States Academic Decathlon for Division II school.

=== eSports ===
The Westwood Regional High School eSports team came in 2nd place at the National High School Rocket League Championship in 2024. The Cardinals were the Garden State eSports state champions for Rocket League in the spring 2024 champions league.

=== Garden State Film Festival ===
In 2025, WRHS student Emma Lagatol won the New Jersey Hometown Documentary Short- High School category for her film "Forever a Cardinal'.

== Athletics ==
The Westwood Regional High School Cardinals compete in the Big North Conference, which is comprised of public and private high schools in Bergen and Passaic counties, and was established following a reorganization of sports leagues in Northern New Jersey by the New Jersey State Interscholastic Athletic Association (NJSIAA). Before the NJSIAA's 2009 realignment, the school had previously participated in the Bergen County Scholastic League (BCSL) American Conference, which included public and private high schools located in Bergen and Hudson counties. With 628 students in grades 10–12, the school was classified by the NJSIAA for the 2019–20 school year as Group II for most athletic competition purposes, which included schools with an enrollment of 486 to 758 students in that grade range. The football team competes in the American Red division of the North Jersey Super Football Conference, which includes 112 schools competing in 20 divisions, making it the nation's biggest football-only high school sports league. The school was classified by the NJSIAA as Group II North for football for 2024–2026, which included schools with 484 to 683 students. Westwood Regional High School athletic teams are called the Cardinals. They wear school colors scarlet, white and black. The school's original colors were scarlet and white, with black added later as an official school color.

Dan Vivino, the school's athletic director, was selected in 2024 as the Jim Grasso Athletic Director of the Year for Bergen County.

The school participates in joint cooperative boys / girls swimming teams with River Dell High School as the host school / lead agency. River Dell also hosts a co-op ice hockey team that includes Emerson Junior-Senior High School and Westwood. These co-op programs operate under agreements scheduled to expire at the end of the 2023–24 school year.

Sports offered by the school include:

- Fall sports: cross country (boys and girls), field hockey, football, soccer (boys and girls), tennis (girls), volleyball (girls)
- Winter sports: basketball (boys and girls), bowling (boys), indoor track (boys and girls), wrestling
- Spring sports: baseball, golf, lacrosse (boys and girls), outdoor track (boys and girls), softball, tennis (boys)

The boys' basketball team finished the 1951 season with a 21–1 record after winning the Group II state championship with a 68–48 victory against runner-up Ocean City High School in the tournament final.

The boys cross country team won the Group II state title in 1963.

The softball team won the North I state sectional championship in 1974 and 1975.

The field hockey team won the North I Group II state sectional title in 1987 and won the Group II state title that year as co-champion after a 1–1 tie in the finals against Moorestown High School to finish the season with a record of 18-2-1.

The girls volleyball team won the Group II state championship in 1989 (defeating runner-up Lyndhurst High School in the final match of the playoffs) and 1997 (vs. New Milford High School).

The boys track team won the indoor relay championship in Group I in 1998

The football team won the NJSIAA North I Group II state sectional championship in 2000, 2006, 2013, 2014, 2022 and 2023 and won the North I Group I title in 2004. The 2000 team won the North II Group I state sectional title with a 33–7 win against Pompton Lakes High School in the championship final played at Kean University. The 2006 team went to Giants Stadium in East Rutherford where they played the Indians of Pascack Valley High School in the North I Group II finals, beating them 9–8. The school has had a football rivalry since 1976 with River Dell High School called the "Bird Bowl", in which the winner receives a trophy with a football inside of a bird cage. Westwood leads the series with an overall record of 20-18 through the 2017 season. NJ.com listed the rivalry as 28th on its 2017 list "Ranking the 31 fiercest rivalries in N.J. HS football". The team won the North I Group II sectional title in 2022, stopping a two-point conversion by Rutherford High School with seconds left on the clock to win 21-20 and repeated in 2023 with a 20-7 victory in the North I Group II sectional finals against Rutherford.

The boys' spring track team won three consecutive Bergen County Tournament championships from 2004 to 2006. In Spring 2005 the team went undefeated in Bergen County, and won the North I Group II state championship by a record margin.

In 2007, the boys' basketball team played in the North I, Group II state championship, falling to Pascack Hills High School by 66–65 in overtime, in a game played at River Dell High School.

The girls spring track team was the Group I co-champion in 2010.

== Administration ==
The school's principal is Frank Connelly. The administrative team includes two assistant principals.

== Notable alumni ==
- Reuven Ben-Yosef (1937–2001), poet and author
- Frank Ackerman Hill (1919–2012), military veteran and World War II fighter ace
- Raymond E. Johns Jr. (born 1955), General, Commander Air Mobility Command, United States Air Force
- James O'Keefe (born 1984), activist-filmmaker who targeted ACORN
- B. J. Raji (born 1986), the ninth overall pick in 2009 NFL Draft by the Green Bay Packers
- Corey Raji (born 1988), professional basketball player
- Elizabeth Randall (born 1954, class of 1971), politician who represented the 39th Legislative Districtin the New Jersey General Assembly from 1986 to 1992
- Kevin Sampson (born 1981), tackle for the Kansas City Chiefs
- Kyle Scatliffe (born 1986), stage actor who appeared on Broadway in Les Misérables and The Color Purple
- Bob Schroeder (born 1960), businessman, politician and convicted felon who served in the New Jersey General Assembly from 2010 to 2014, where he represented the 39th Legislative District.
