= Pascack Valley (disambiguation) =

Pascack Valley is the name for a region of Bergen County, New Jersey in the United States. It is named for the Pascack Brook, which defines the valley. The region consists of eight municipalities: Montvale, Park Ridge, Woodcliff Lake, Hillsdale, Westwood, River Vale, Washington Township and Emerson.

Pascack Valley may also refer to the following locations in New Jersey:

- Pascack Valley Hospital, a former hospital in Westwood
- Pascack Valley Line, a commuter rail line
- Pascack Valley Regional High School District
  - Pascack Hills High School, in Montvale
  - Pascack Valley High School, in Hillsdale
