= Westwood Regional School District =

School district in Bergen County, New Jersey, US

Address
- 701 Ridgewood Road Washington Township, Bergen County, New Jersey, 07676; United States
- Coordinates: 40.981009°N 74.062298°W

District information
- Grades: K-12
- Superintendent: Patrick McQueeney
- Business administrator: Keith Rosado
- Schools: 6

Students and staff
- Enrollment: 2,828 (as of 2023–24)
- Faculty: 259.2 FTEs
- Student–teacher ratio: 10.9:1

Other information
- District Factor Group: GH
- Website: www.wwrsd.org
Ind.	Per pupil	District spending	Rank (*)	K-12 average	%± vs. average
1A	Total Spending	$20,148	58	$18,891	6.7%
1	Budgetary Cost	16,254	60	14,783	10.0%
2	Classroom Instruction	8,541	47	8,763	−2.5%
6	Support Services	3,681	66	2,392	53.9%
8	Administrative Cost	1,912	64	1,485	28.8%
10	Operations & Maintenance	1,606	36	1,783	−9.9%
13	Extracurricular Activities	504	58	268	88.1%
16	Median Teacher Salary	60,913	21	64,043
Data from NJDoE 2014 Taxpayers' Guide to Education Spending. *Of K-12 districts with 1,800-3,500 students. Lowest spending=1; Highest=68

The Westwood Regional School District is a comprehensive regional public school district serving students in kindergarten through twelfth grade from the communities of the Borough of Westwood and Washington Township in Bergen County, in the U.S. state of New Jersey, two communities located approximately 15 miles (24 km) northwest of Midtown Manhattan. The district is the county's only regional district serving grades K-12. The district operates with a 1:1 ratio for students and computers.

As of the 2023–24 school year, the district, comprised of six schools, had an enrollment of 2,828 students and 259.2 classroom teachers (on an FTE basis), for a student–teacher ratio of 10.9:1.

== History ==
For the 2010–11 school year, Ketler Elementary School, which had served K–4, was shifted to become Westwood Regional Middle School for grades 6 and 7, while the other elementary schools would all serve K through 5, and the high school was shifted to grades 8–12 (from 7–12).

In December 2017, voters in the two municipalities approved a referendum by a 61–39% margin that would allocate $24 million in bonds to be used for the construction of a 50,000-square-foot (4,600 m^{2}) expansion of Westwood Regional Middle School so that eighth grade students would be shifted from the high school and served at the middle school.

The district had been classified by the New Jersey Department of Education as being in District Factor Group "GH", the third-highest of eight groupings. District Factor Groups organize districts statewide to allow comparison by common socioeconomic characteristics of the local districts. From lowest socioeconomic status to highest, the categories are A, B, CD, DE, FG, GH, I and J.

== Awards and recognition ==
Berkeley Avenue Elementary School was one of nine public schools recognized in 2017 as Blue Ribbon Schools by the United States Department of Education.

For the 2000–01 school year, Brookside Elementary School was named a "Star School" by the New Jersey Department of Education, the highest honor that a New Jersey school can achieve.

== Schools ==
Schools in the district (with 2023–24 enrollment data from the National Center for Education Statistics) are:

Elementary schools

- Berkeley Elementary School with 282 students in grades K–5
  - Michael J. Fiorello, principal
- Brookside Elementary School with 375 students in grades K–5
  - Kelly Hughes, principal
- Jessie F. George Elementary School with 283 students in grades K–5
  - Christina Scaduto, principal
- Washington Elementary School with 322 students in grades K–5
  - Melissa Palianto, principal

Middle school

- Westwood Regional Middle School with 683 students in grades 6–8
  - Nicole Suntino, principal

High school

- Westwood Regional High School with 839 students in grades 9–12
  - Frank Connelly, principal

== Administration ==
Core members of the district's administration are:

- Patrick McQueeney, superintendent
- Keith A. Rosado, business administrator and board secretary

== Board of education ==
The district's board of education, comprised of nine members, sets policy and oversees the fiscal and educational operation of the district through its administration. As a Type II school district, the board's trustees are elected directly by voters to serve three-year terms of office on a staggered basis, with three seats up for election each year held (since 2012) as part of the November general election. The board appoints a superintendent to oversee the district's day-to-day operations and a business administrator to supervise the business functions of the district. Seats on the nine-member board are allocated based on population of the constituent municipalities, with five allocated to Westwood and four to Washington Township.
