= Adam Vandelinda House =

Historic house in New Jersey, U.S.

- U.S. National Register of Historic Places
- New Jersey Register of Historic Places
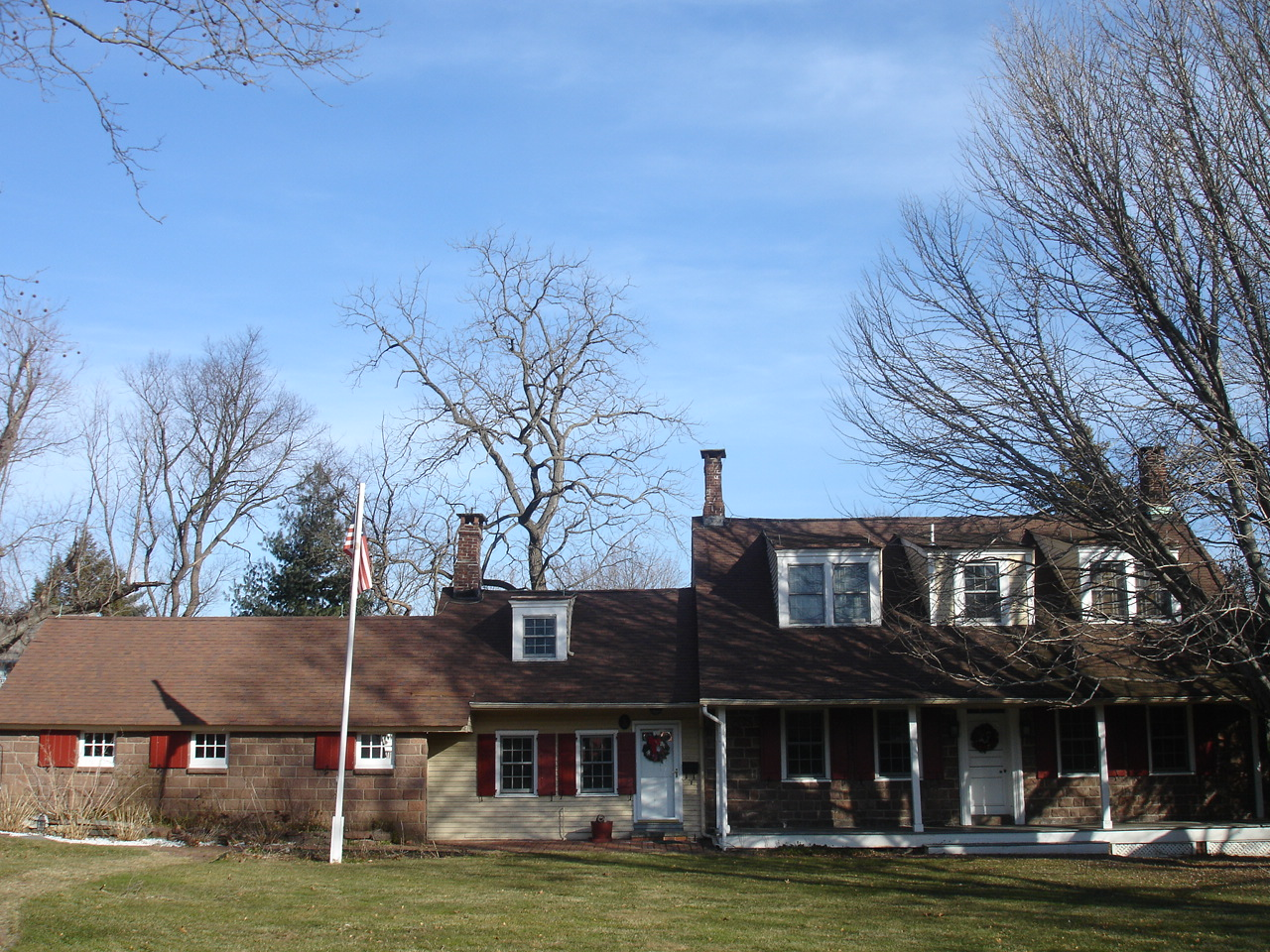
- The Adam Vandelinda House in 2012

- Location within Bergen County, New Jersey Location within New Jersey Location within the United States
- Location: 586 Teaneck Road, Teaneck, New Jersey
- Coordinates: 40°52′43″N 74°0′42″W
- Area: less than one acre
- Built: 1780
- MPS: Stone Houses of Bergen County TR
- NRHP reference No.: 83001562
- NJRHP No.: 699

Significant dates
- Added to NRHP: January 10, 1983
- Designated NJRHP: October 3, 1980

Adam Vandelinda House is located in Teaneck, Bergen County, New Jersey, United States. The house was built in 1780 and was added to the National Register of Historic Places on January 10, 1983.

== See also ==
- National Register of Historic Places listings in Bergen County, New Jersey
