= Richard Outwater House =

Historic house in New Jersey, United States

- U.S. National Register of Historic Places
- New Jersey Register of Historic Places
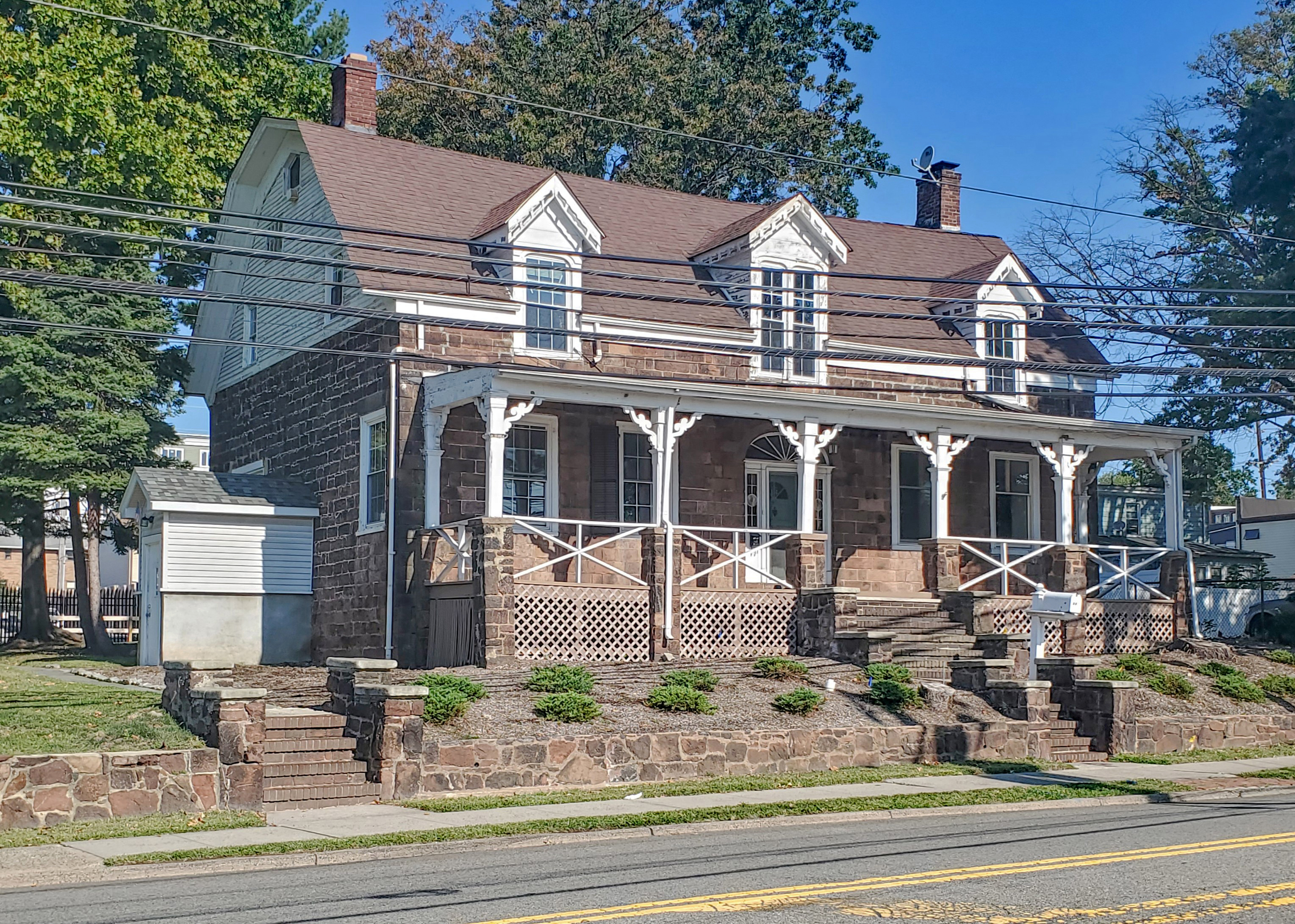
- The Richard Outwater House, September 2024.

- Location within Bergen County, New Jersey Location within New Jersey Location within the United States
- Location: 231 Hackensack Street, East Rutherford, New Jersey
- Coordinates: 40°49′43″N 74°5′54″W
- Built: 1821
- NRHP reference No.: 83001539
- NJRHP No.: 462

Significant dates
- Added to NRHP: January 9, 1983
- Designated NJRHP: October 3, 1980

The Richard Outwater House is located in East Rutherford, Bergen County, New Jersey. The house was built in 1821 for Richard and Catherine Outwater. It is a late example of a stone Dutch Colonial house and has Federalist influences. It was added to the New Jersey Register of Historic Places on October 3, 1980, and the National Register of Historic Places on January 9, 1983.

The house was purchased by the Borough of East Rutherford in 2023.

== See also ==
- National Register of Historic Places listings in Bergen County, New Jersey
