= Vanderbeck House (Mahwah, New Jersey) =

Historic house in New Jersey, United States

- U.S. National Register of Historic Places
- New Jersey Register of Historic Places
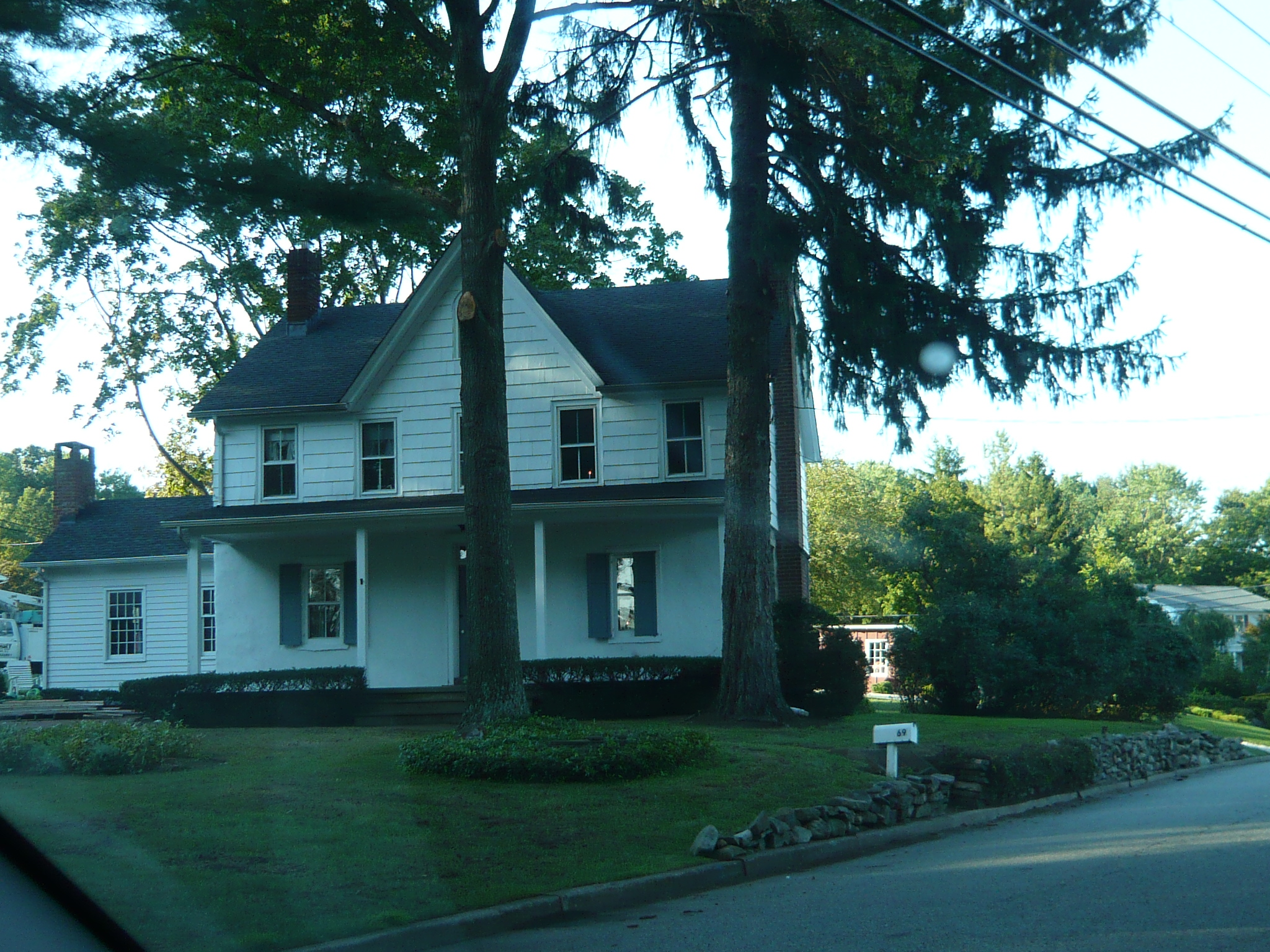

- Location within Bergen County, New Jersey Location within New Jersey Location within the United States
- Location: 69 Vanderbeck Avenue, Mahwah, New Jersey
- Coordinates: 41°2′2″N 74°9′17″W
- Area: less than one acre
- Built: 1760
- MPS: Stone Houses of Bergen County TR
- NRHP reference No.: 83001565
- NJRHP No.: 570

Significant dates
- Added to NRHP: January 10, 1983
- Designated NJRHP: October 3, 1980

Vanderbeck House is a historic house located in Mahwah, Bergen County, New Jersey, United States. Built in 1760, it was added to the National Register of Historic Places on January 10, 1983.

== See also ==
- National Register of Historic Places listings in Bergen County, New Jersey
