= Civil War Drill Hall and Armory =

Historic building in New Jersey, US

- U.S. National Register of Historic Places
- New Jersey Register of Historic Places
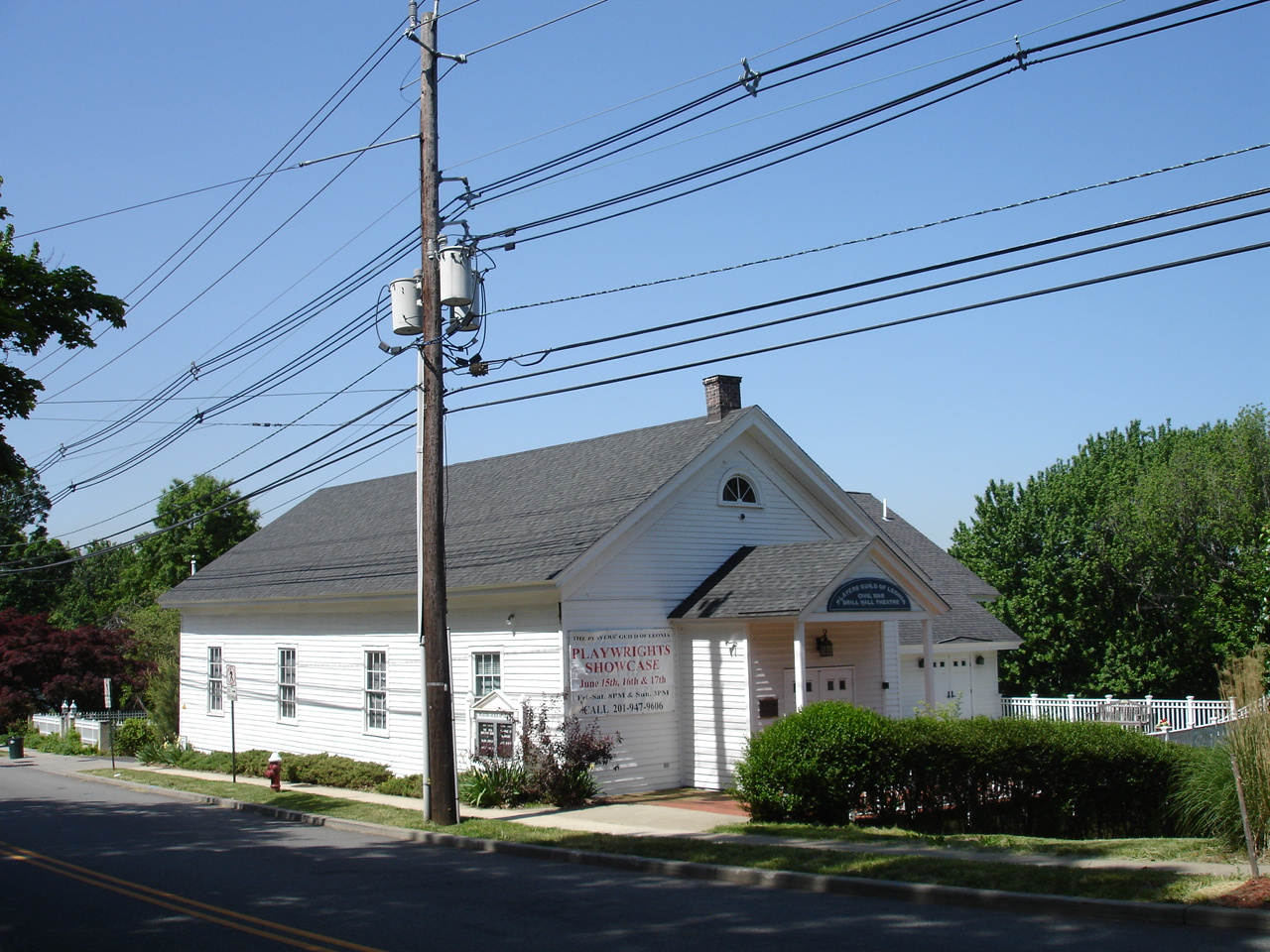
- The Leonia Civil War Drill Hall in spring 2007

- Location within Bergen County, New Jersey Location within New Jersey Location within the United States
- Location: 130 Grand Avenue, Leonia, New Jersey
- Coordinates: 40°51′22″N 73°59′53″W
- Area: 0.3 acres (0.12 ha)
- Built: 1859
- NRHP reference No.: 78001737
- NJRHP No.: 544

Significant dates
- Added to NRHP: October 19, 1978
- Designated NJRHP: April 27, 1978

Civil War Drill Hall and Armory is located in Leonia, Bergen County, New Jersey, United States. The armory was built in 1859 and was added to the National Register of Historic Places on October 19, 1978.

== See also ==
- National Register of Historic Places listings in Bergen County, New Jersey
