= John Bartholf House =

Historic house in New Jersey, US

- U.S. National Register of Historic Places
- New Jersey Register of Historic Places
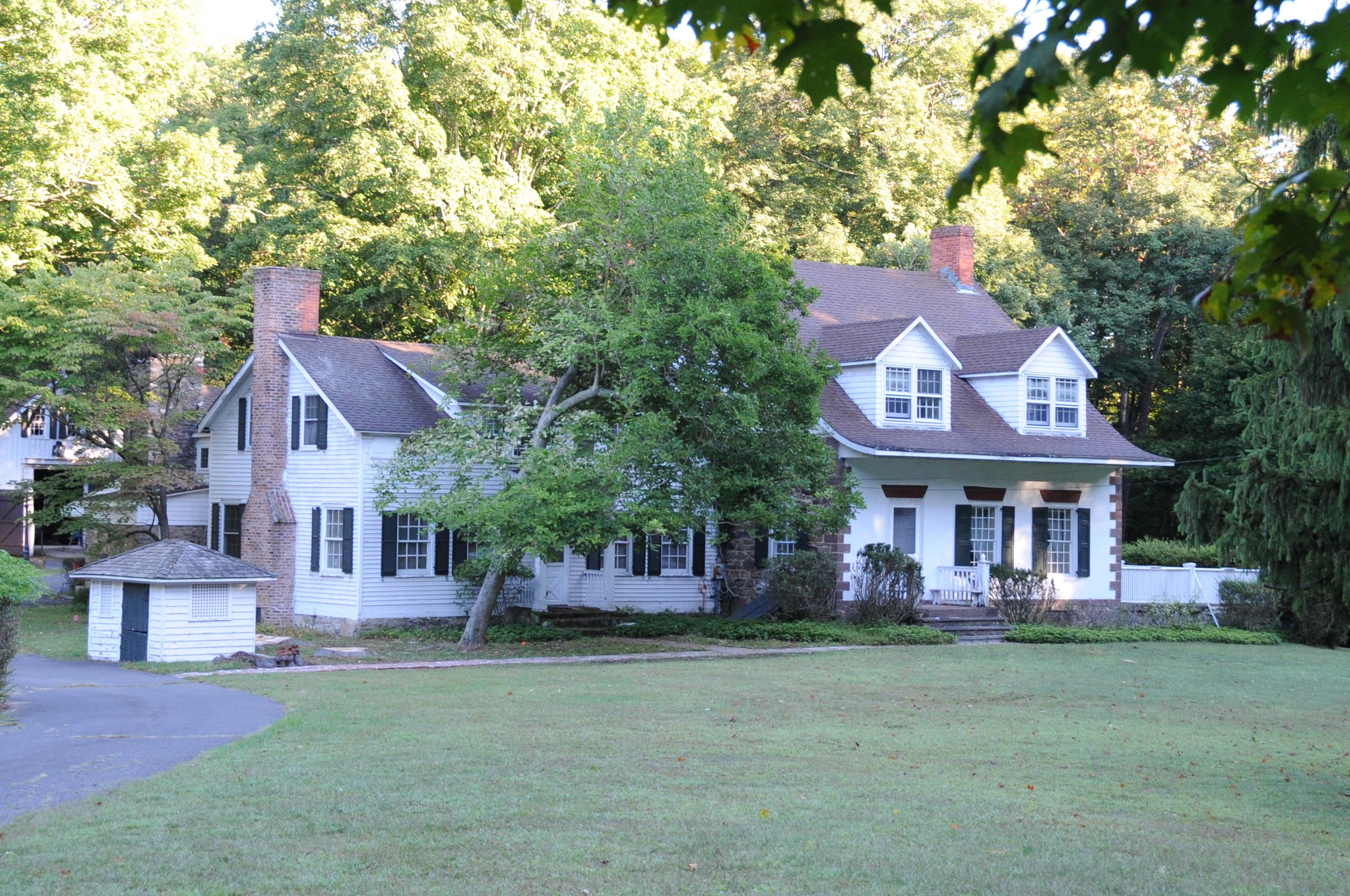
- John Bartholf House seen in 2015

- Location within New Jersey Location within the United States
- Location: 1122 Ramapo Valley Rd., Mahwah, New Jersey
- Coordinates: 41°03′22″N 74°12′52″W
- Area: 21.2 acres (8.6 ha)
- MPS: Stone Houses of Bergen County TR
- NRHP reference No.: 83001463
- NJRHP No.: 557

Significant dates
- Added to NRHP: January 9, 1983
- Designated NJRHP: October 3, 1980

The Bartholf House, also known as Amberfields, is a historic Dutch Colonial house located at 1122 Ramapo Valley Road in Mahwah, Bergen County, New Jersey.

Built in the mid-18th century, it represents a typical Bergen Dutch sandstone farmhouse.

While the exact construction date and builder remain uncertain, the house is named after John Bartholf, a prominent member of a family that settled in the Mahwah area in the early 18th century. The Bartholfs were farmers and landowners, and their descendants continued to occupy the house and surrounding property for several generations.

== Later years ==
Over the years, the John Bartholf House underwent several alterations and additions. In the 20th century, it was converted into apartments. Despite these modifications, the house retains much of its original character and historic fabric.

The John Bartholf House was added to the National Register of Historic Places in 1983.

== See also ==
- National Register of Historic Places listings in Bergen County, New Jersey
