= David Van Gelder House =

Historic house in New Jersey, United States

- U.S. National Register of Historic Places
- New Jersey Register of Historic Places
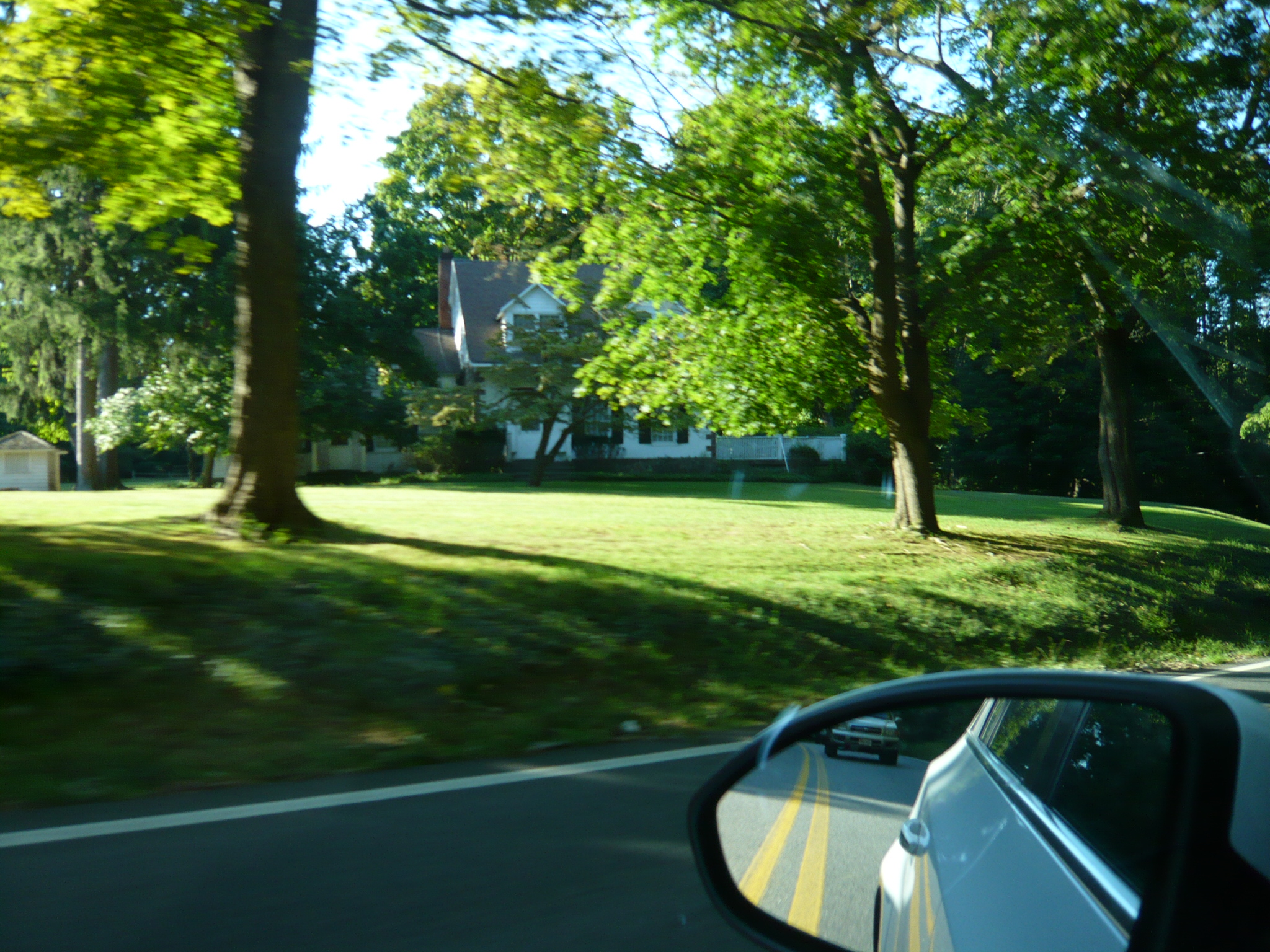

- Location within Bergen County, New Jersey Location within New Jersey Location within the United States
- Location: 37 West Crescent Avenue, Ramsey, New Jersey
- Coordinates: 41°2′37″N 74°9′53″W
- Area: 1.9 acres (0.77 ha)
- Built: 1810
- MPS: Stone Houses of Bergen County TR
- NRHP reference No.: 83001570
- NJRHP No.: 635

Significant dates
- Added to NRHP: January 10, 1983
- Designated NJRHP: October 3, 1980

David Van Gelder House is located in Ramsey, Bergen County, New Jersey, United States. The house was built in 1810 and was added to the National Register of Historic Places on January 10, 1983.

== See also ==
- National Register of Historic Places listings in Bergen County, New Jersey
