= Paulison-Christie House =

Historic house in New Jersey, United States

- U.S. National Register of Historic Places
- New Jersey Register of Historic Places
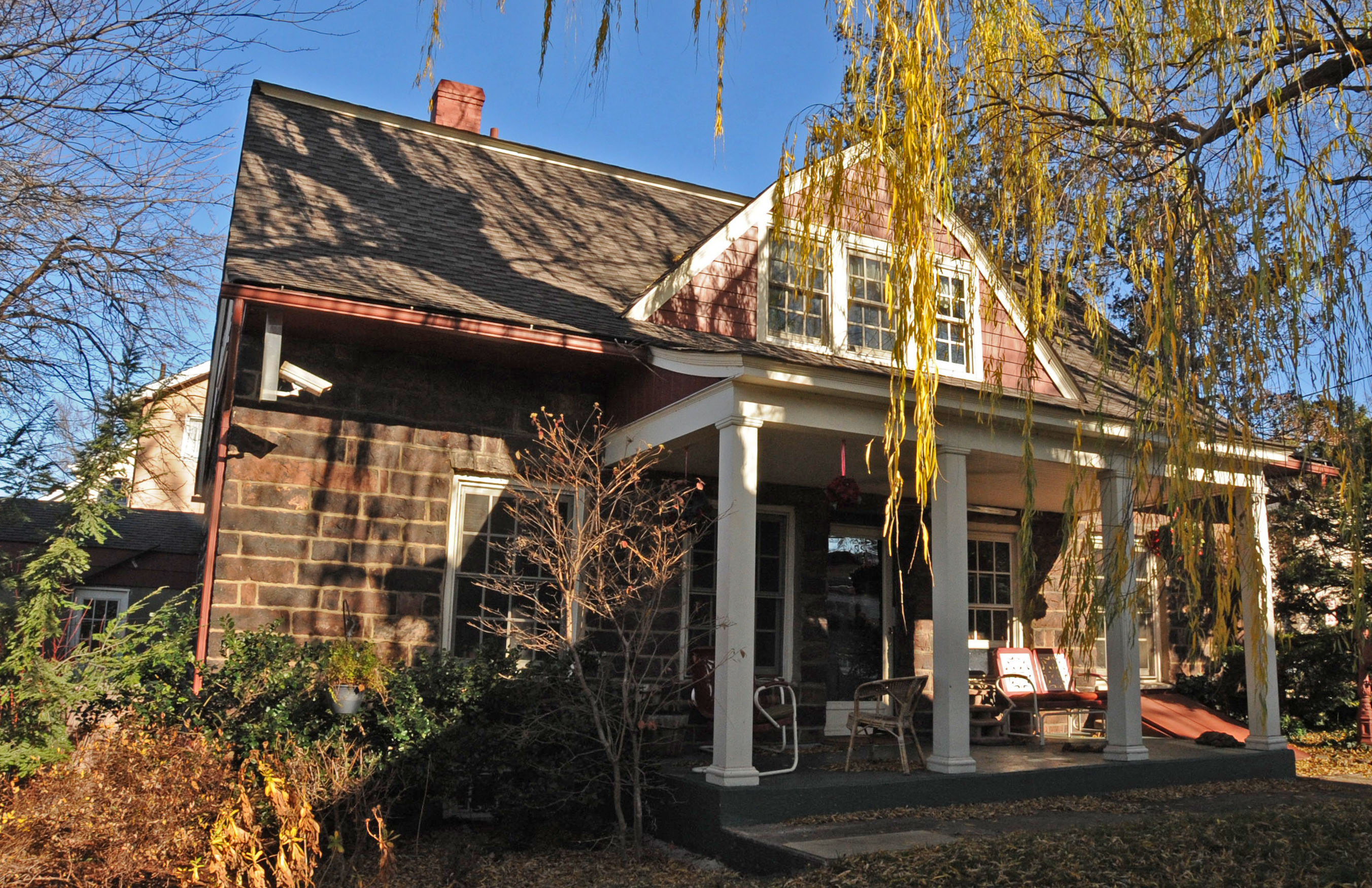
- Paulison–Christie House in 2015

- Location within Bergen County, New Jersey Location within New Jersey Location within the United States
- Location: 8 Homestead Place, Ridgefield Park, New Jersey
- Coordinates: 40°51′10″N 74°1′39″W
- Area: less than one acre
- MPS: Stone Houses of Bergen County TR
- NRHP reference No.: 83001541
- NJRHP No.: 639

Significant dates
- Added to NRHP: January 10, 1983
- Designated NJRHP: October 3, 1980

Paulison-Christie House is located in Ridgefield Park, Bergen County, New Jersey, United States. The house was added to the National Register of Historic Places on January 10, 1983.

The house was built about 1775 by John Paulison who owned 150 acres in what was then known as "Old Hackensack." John Paulison was a Tory during the Revolutionary War and was known to have sold cattle from his farm to the British army. He was declared by the New Jersey Council of Safety to be a "disaffected person" on July 11, 1777 and was arrested for his suspected Tory sympathies. He spent months confined to the jail in Morristown, being freed in a prisoner exchange in New York City.

In 1779, the farm was raided by the British, who made no distinction between patriots and Torys in such instances. In 1826, John Paulison's son, Paul Paulison, inherited the house. In 1844, David Christie purchased the property for his son Albert Brinkerhoff Christie. The farmhouse remained in the Christie family for 140 years.

== See also ==
- National Register of Historic Places listings in Bergen County, New Jersey
