= Beauclaire-Vreeland House =

Historic house in New Jersey, US

- U.S. National Register of Historic Places
- New Jersey Register of Historic Places
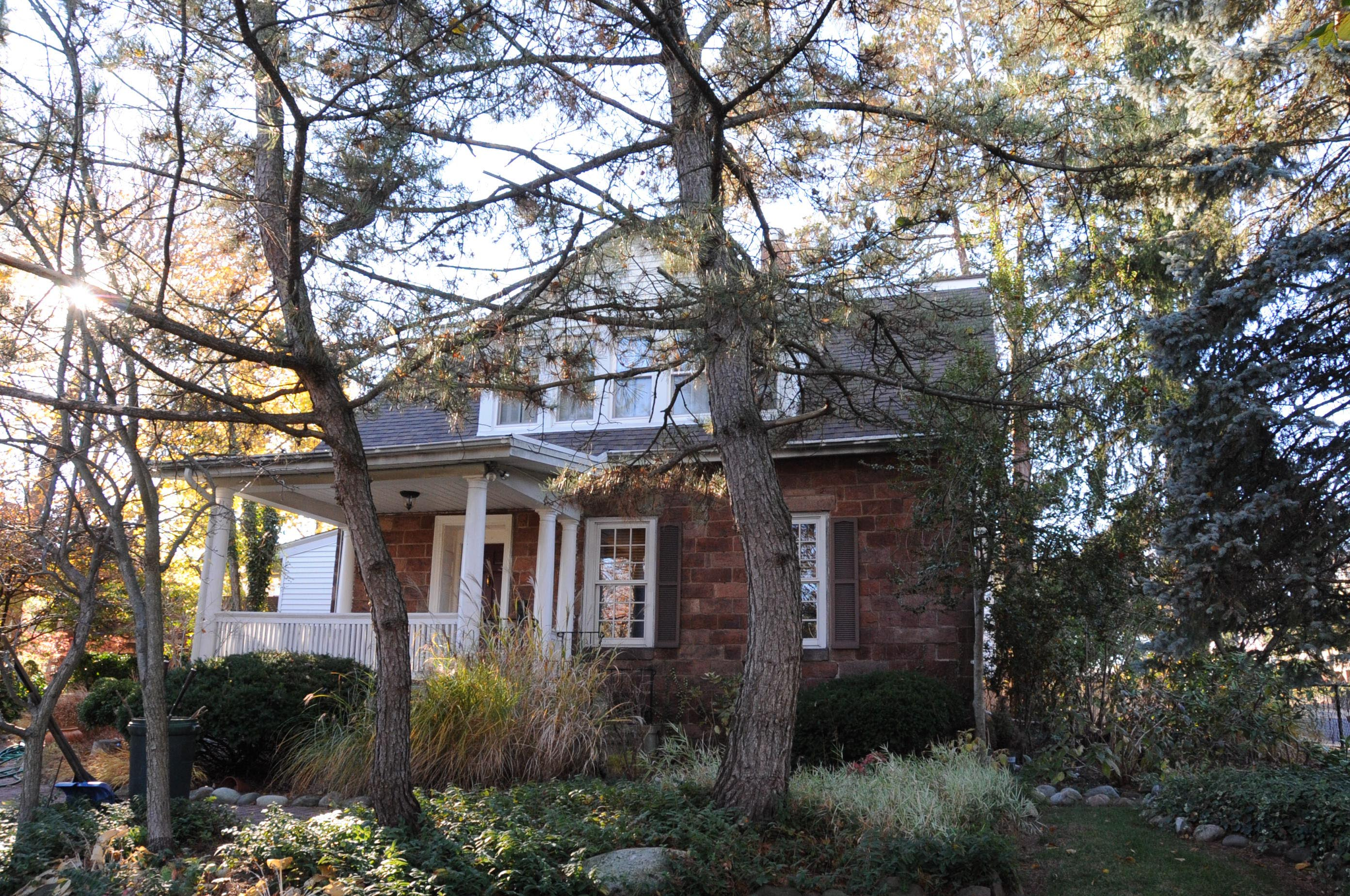

- Location within Bergen County, New Jersey Location within New Jersey Location within the United States
- Location: 88 East Clinton Avenue, Bergenfield, New Jersey
- Coordinates: 40°55′25″N 73°59′37″W
- Area: less than one acre
- MPS: Stone Houses of Bergen County TR
- NRHP reference No.: 83001464
- NJRHP No.: 432

Significant dates
- Added to NRHP: January 9, 1983
- Designated NJRHP: October 3, 1980

Beauclaire-Vreeland House is located in Bergenfield, Bergen County, New Jersey, United States. The house was added to the National Register of Historic Places on January 9, 1983.

== See also ==
- National Register of Historic Places listings in Bergen County, New Jersey
