= Presbyterian Church of Norwood =

Historic church in New Jersey, United States

- U.S. National Register of Historic Places
- New Jersey Register of Historic Places
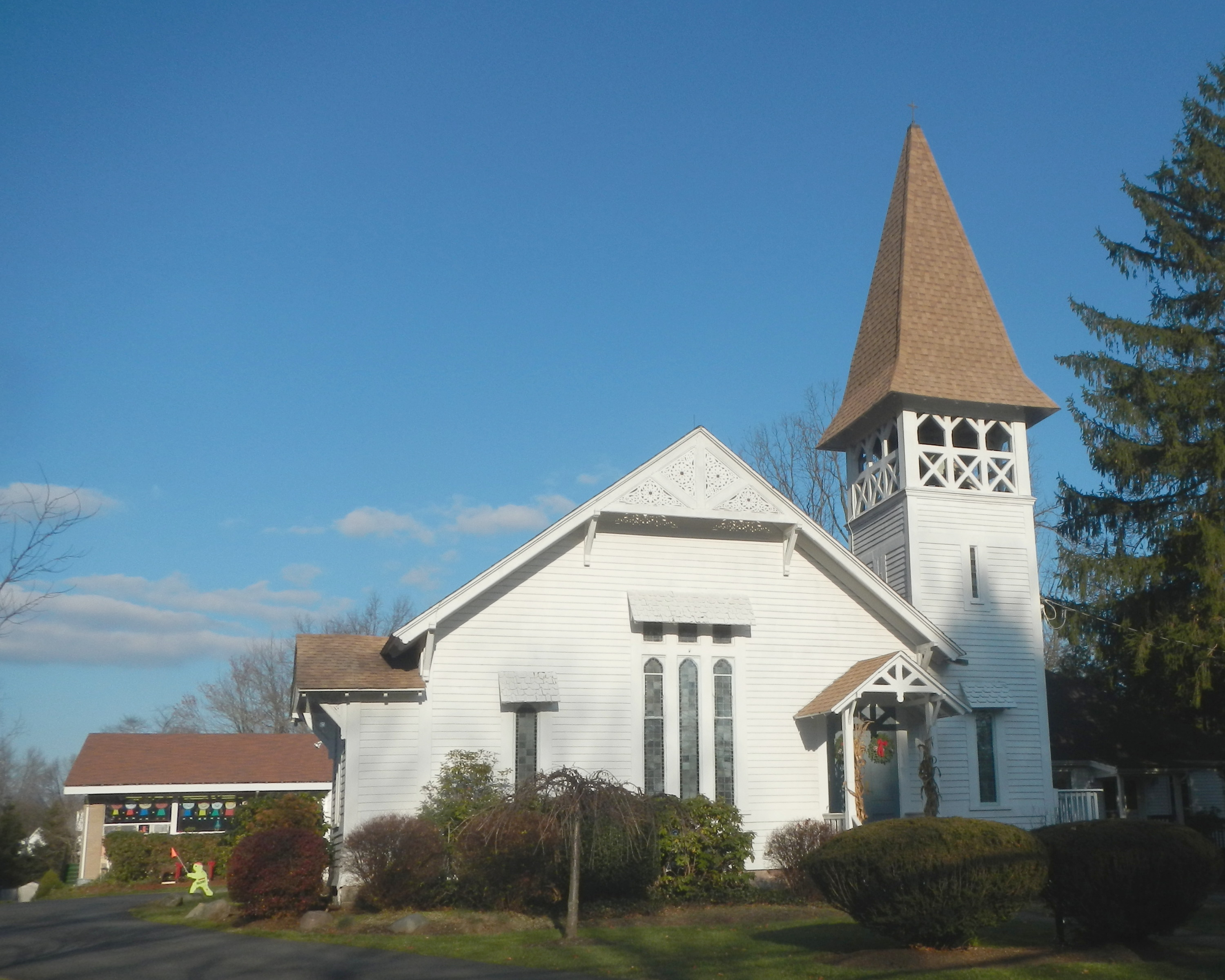

- Location within Bergen County, New Jersey Location within New Jersey Location within the United States
- Location: 701 Broadway, Norwood, New Jersey
- Coordinates: 40°59′54″N 73°57′39″W
- Area: less than one acre
- Built: 1868
- Architects: Smith, R.C.
- Architectural style: Stick/Eastlake
- NRHP reference No.: 05001567
- NJRHP No.: 4266

Significant dates
- Added to NRHP: February 1, 2006
- Designated NJRHP: December 7, 2005

The Presbyterian Church of Norwood is a historic church at 701 Broadway in Norwood, Bergen County, New Jersey, United States. The church was built in 1868 and added to the National Register of Historic Places on February 1, 2006.

== See also ==
- National Register of Historic Places listings in Bergen County, New Jersey
