= Midland School (Paramus, New Jersey) =

- U.S. National Register of Historic Places
- New Jersey Register of Historic Places
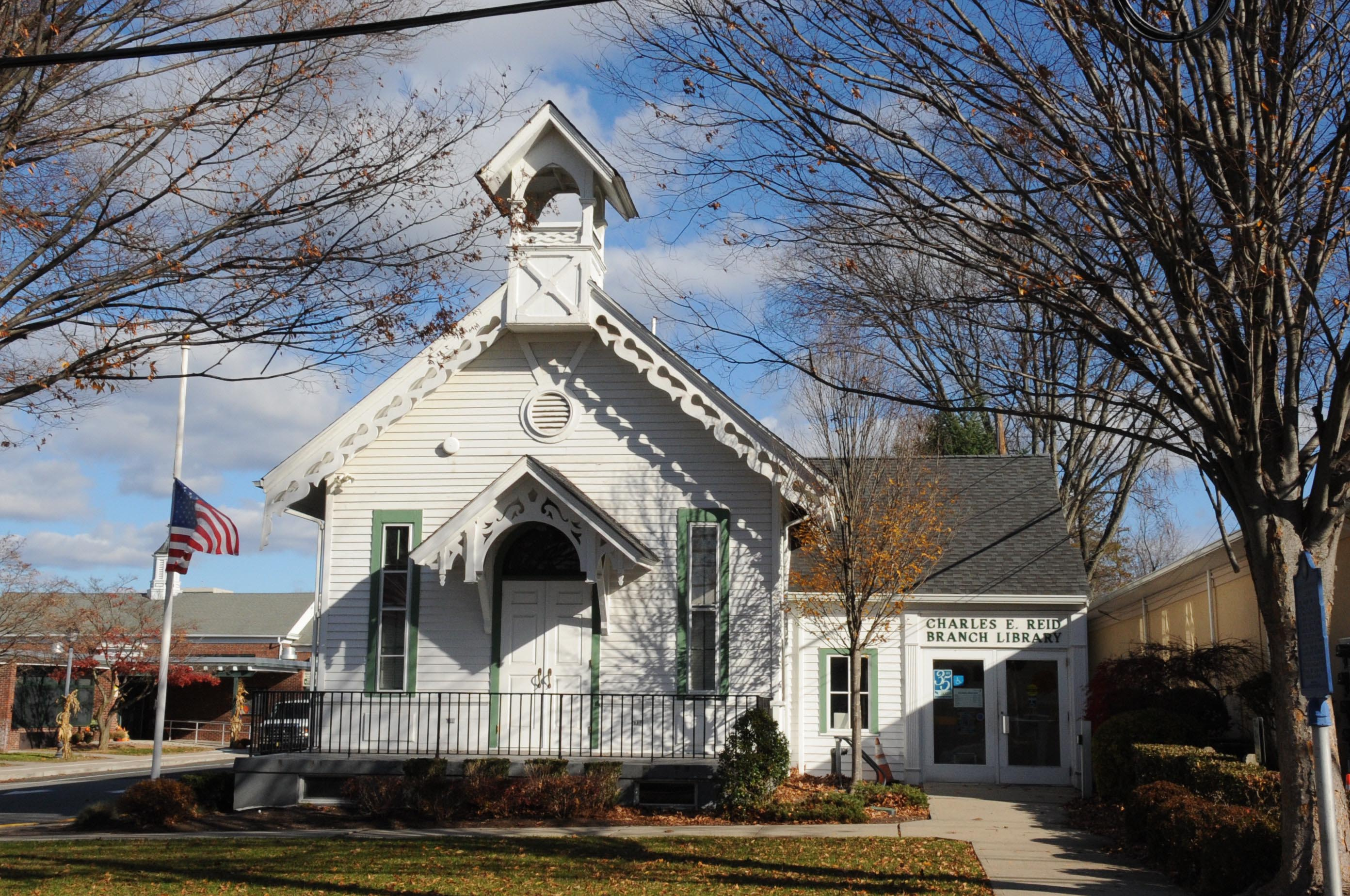
- Midland School in 2015

- Location within Bergen County, New Jersey Location within New Jersey Location within the United States
- Location: 239 West Midland Avenue, Paramus, New Jersey
- Coordinates: 40°57′38″N 74°5′23″W
- Area: 0.5 acres (0.20 ha)
- Built: 1876
- NRHP reference No.: 78001740
- NJRHP No.: 616

Significant dates
- Added to NRHP: April 7, 1978
- Designated NJRHP: April 4, 1977

The Midland School is located in Paramus, Bergen County, New Jersey, United States. The schoolhouse was built in 1876 and added to the National Register of Historic Places on April 7, 1978. The building is currently used as the Charles E. Reid branch of the Paramus Public Library and should not be confused with the later-built elementary school next door which is also named Midland School.

== See also ==
- National Register of Historic Places listings in Bergen County, New Jersey
