= William Holdrum House =

Historic house in New Jersey, United States

- U.S. National Register of Historic Places
- New Jersey Register of Historic Places
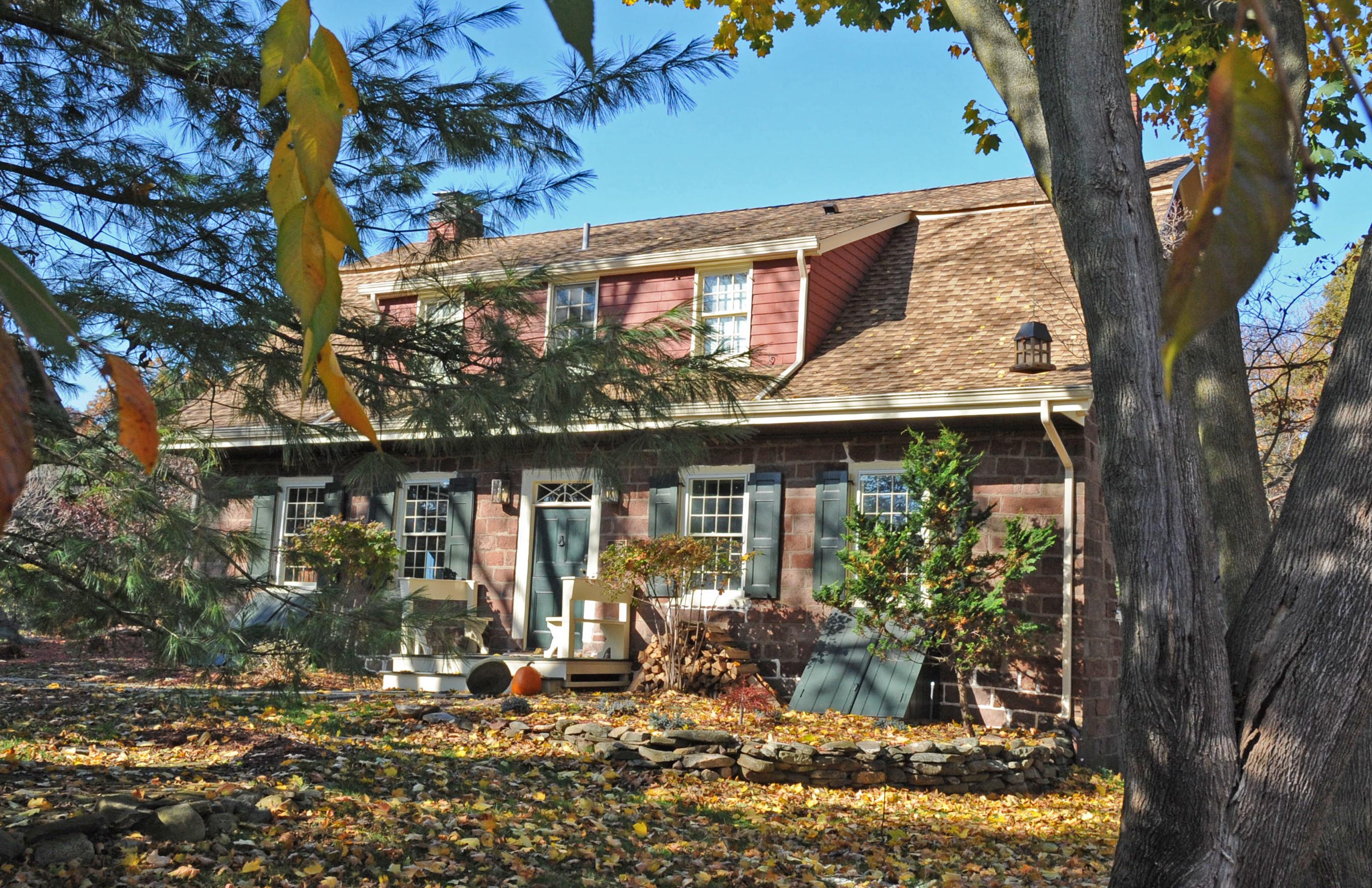
- William Holdrum House in 2008.

- Location within Bergen County, New Jersey Location within New Jersey Location within the United States
- Location: 634 Midvale Court, River Vale, New Jersey
- Coordinates: 41°1′22″N 74°0′39″W
- Area: 6 acres (2.4 ha)
- Built: 1763
- Architect: William Holdrum
- MPS: Stone Houses of Bergen County TR
- NRHP reference No.: 83001519
- NJRHP No.: 658

Significant dates
- Added to NRHP: January 10, 1983
- Designated NJRHP: October 3, 1980

William Holdrum House is located in River Vale, Bergen County, New Jersey, United States. The house was built in 1763 by William Holdrum and was added to the National Register of Historic Places on January 10, 1983.

== See also ==
- National Register of Historic Places listings in Bergen County, New Jersey
