= Van Horn–Newcomb House =

- U.S. National Register of Historic Places
- New Jersey Register of Historic Places
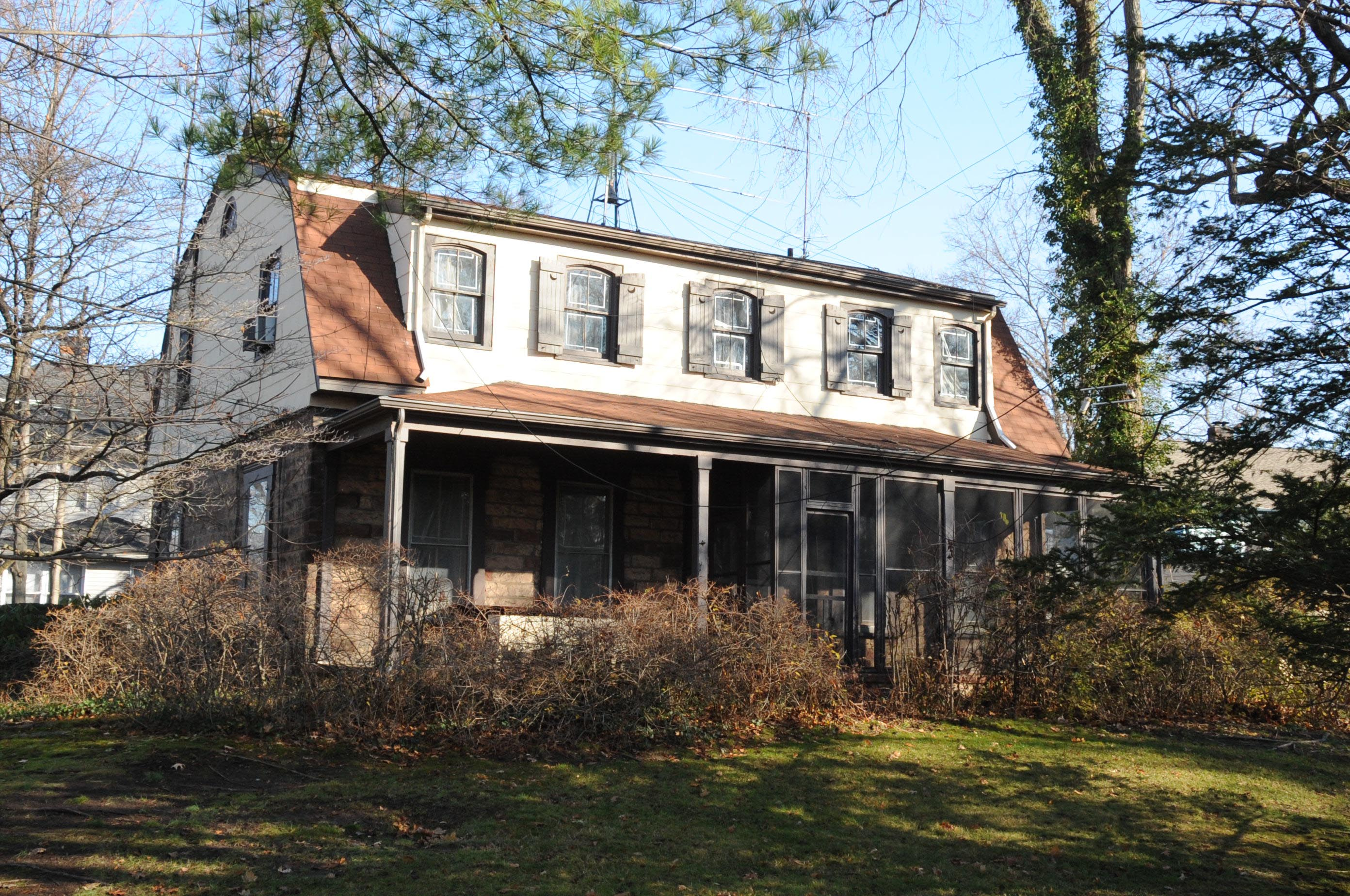

- Location within Bergen County, New Jersey Location within New Jersey Location within the United States
- Location: 303 Tenafly Road, Englewood, New Jersey
- Coordinates: 40°54′16″N 73°58′31″W
- MPS: Stone Houses of Bergen County TR
- NRHP reference No.: 84002590
- NJRHP No.: 475

Significant dates
- Added to NRHP: July 24, 1984
- Designated NJRHP: October 3, 1980

The Van Horn–Newcomb House is located at 303 Tenafly Road in the city of Englewood in Bergen County, New Jersey, United States. The historic stone house was added to the National Register of Historic Places on July 24, 1984, for its significance in architecture and exploration/settlement. It was listed as part of the Early Stone Houses of Bergen County Multiple Property Submission (MPS). According to the nomination form, the roughly cut sandstone house may have been built by a member of the Durie family. The 1861 Hopkins–Corey map lists D. Van Horn living here.

== See also ==
- National Register of Historic Places listings in Bergen County, New Jersey
