= John Banta House =

Historic house in New Jersey, US

- U.S. National Register of Historic Places
- New Jersey Register of Historic Places
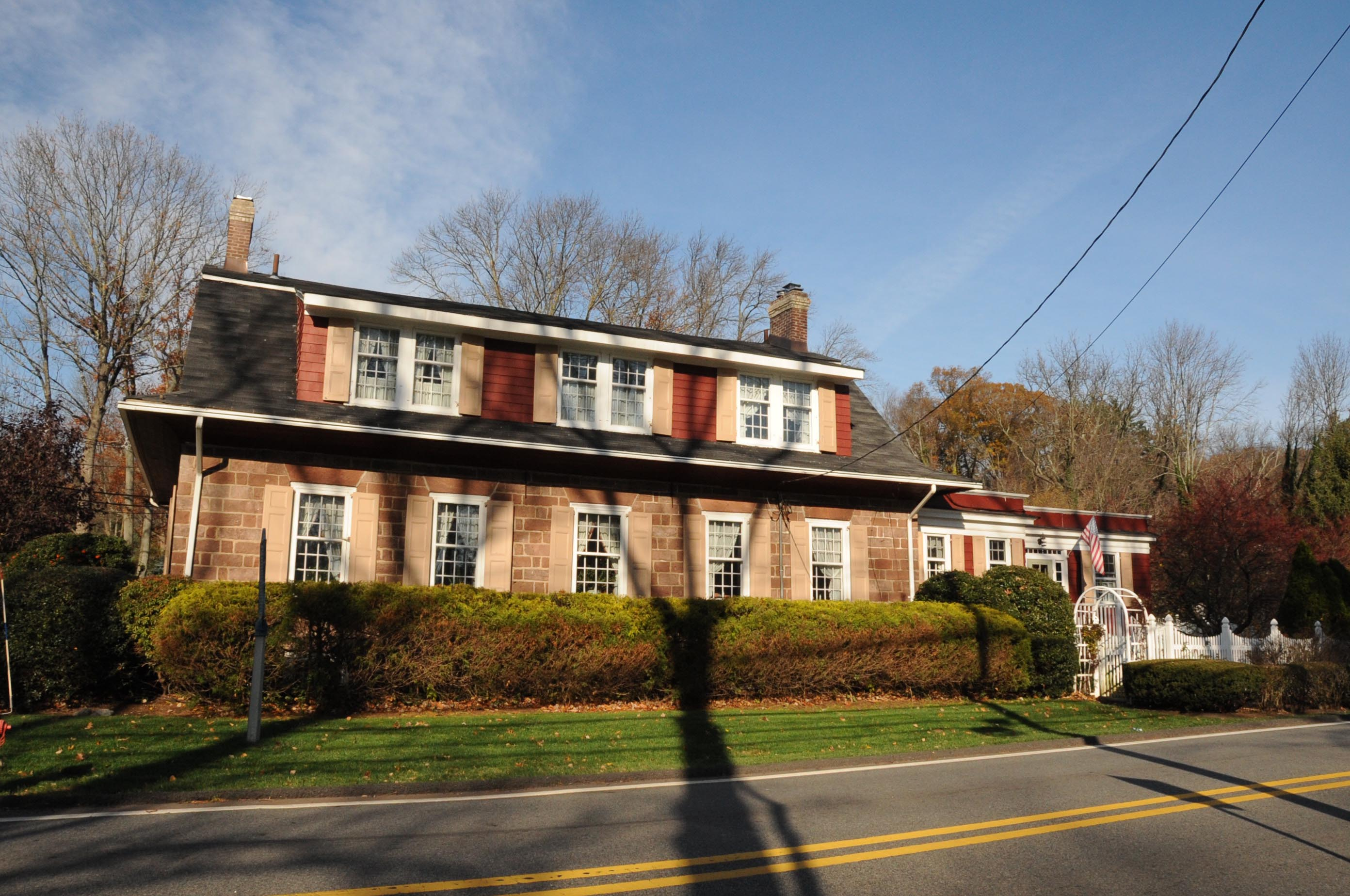
- John Banta House in 2015

- Location within Bergen County, New Jersey Location within New Jersey Location within the United States
- Location: 211 Pascack Road, Hillsdale, New Jersey
- Coordinates: 41°0′29″N 74°3′23″W
- Area: less than one acre
- MPS: Stone Houses of Bergen County TR
- NRHP reference No.: 83001462
- NJRHP No.: 534

Significant dates
- Added to NRHP: January 9, 1983
- Designated NJRHP: October 3, 1980

John Banta House is located in Hillsdale, Bergen County, New Jersey, United States. The house was added to the National Register of Historic Places on January 9, 1983. It was built in 1796.

== See also ==
- National Register of Historic Places listings in Bergen County, New Jersey
