= Anderson Outkitchen =

Historic building in New Jersey, US

- U.S. National Register of Historic Places
- New Jersey Register of Historic Places
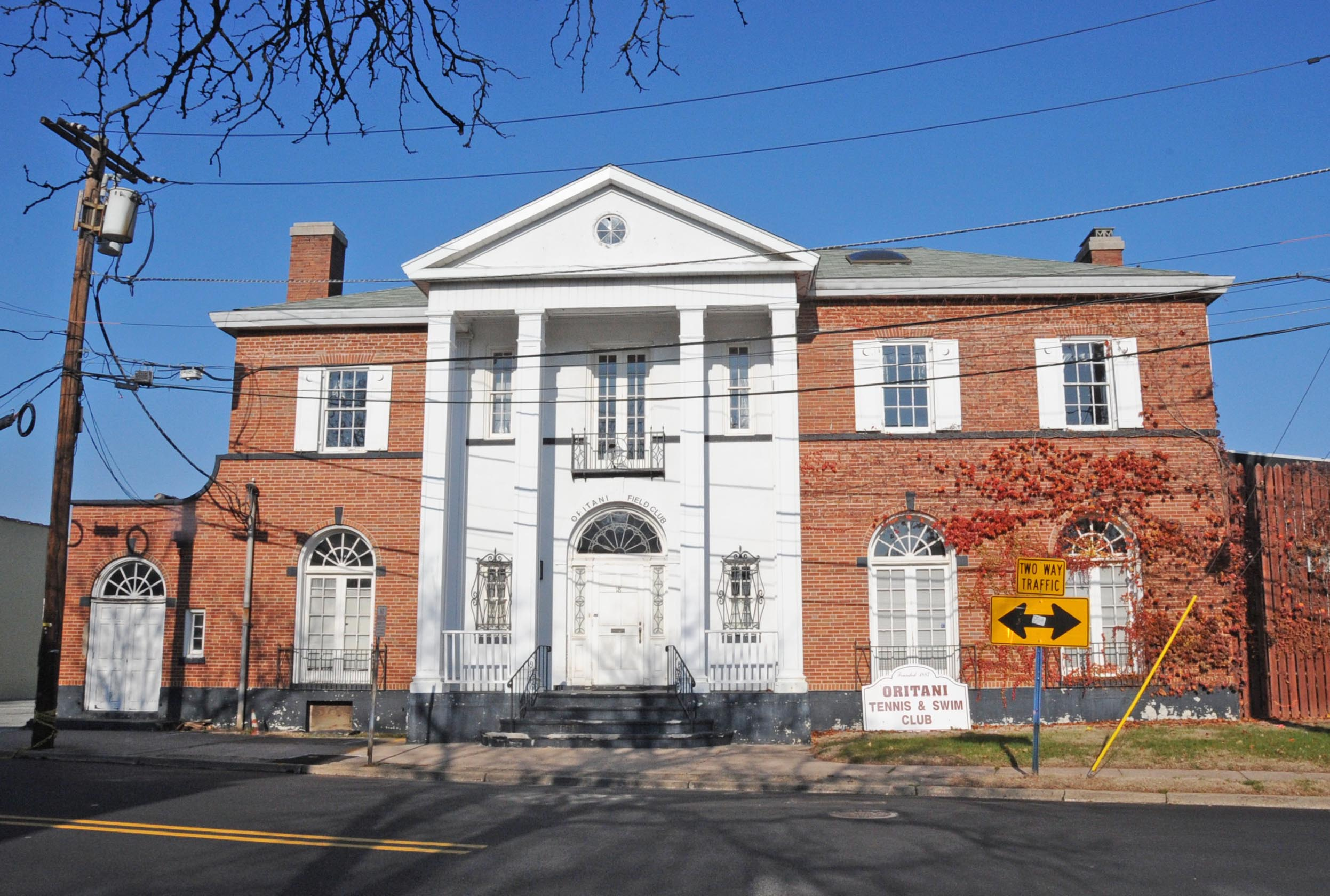

- Location within Bergen County, New Jersey Location within New Jersey Location within the United States
- Location: 18 East Camden Street, Hackensack, New Jersey
- Coordinates: 40°53′15″N 74°2′25″W
- Area: less than one acre
- MPS: Stone Houses of Bergen County TR
- NRHP reference No.: 85002591
- NJRHP No.: 518

Significant dates
- Added to NRHP: August 8, 1985
- Designated NJRHP: October 3, 1980

The Anderson Outkitchen is located in Hackensack, Bergen County, New Jersey, United States. The outkitchen was added to the National Register of Historic Places on August 8, 1985.

== See also ==
- National Register of Historic Places listings in Bergen County, New Jersey
