= Eckerson House =

Historic house in New Jersey, United States

- U.S. National Register of Historic Places
- New Jersey Register of Historic Places
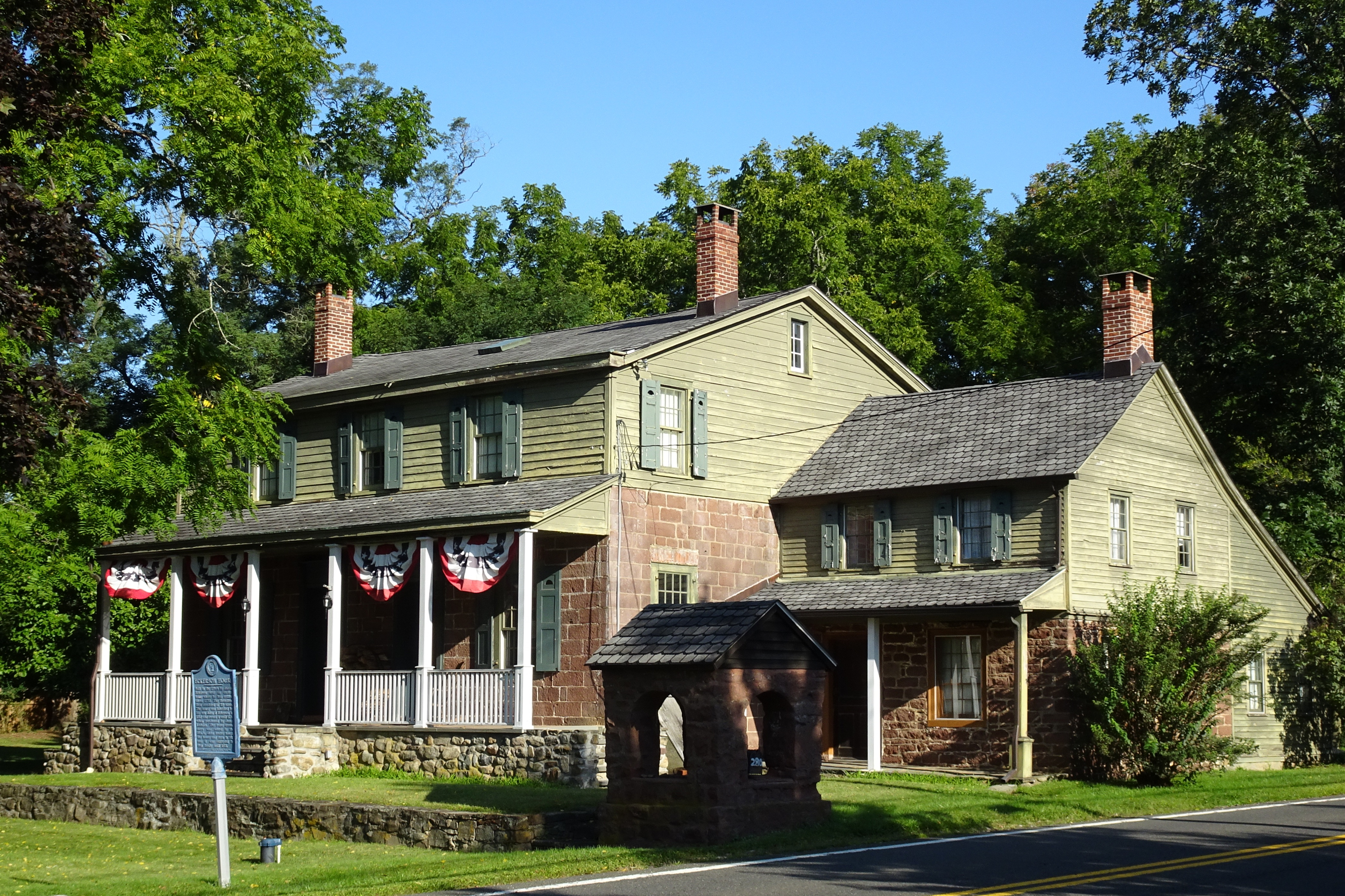
- Eckerson House in 2017

- Location within Bergen County, New Jersey Location within New Jersey Location within the United States
- Location: 280 Chestnut Ridge Road, Montvale, New Jersey
- Coordinates: 41°4′14″N 74°4′5″W
- Built: 1796
- MPS: Early Stone Houses of Bergen County
- NRHP reference No.: 83001504
- NJRHP No.: 580

Significant dates
- Added to NRHP: January 10, 1983
- Designated NJRHP: October 3, 1980

The Eckerson House is a historic stone house located at 280 Chestnut Ridge Road in the borough of Montvale in Bergen County, New Jersey, United States. The oldest section of the house dates to 1796, with an addition in 1799, and a second story in 1890. It was documented as the Abram G. Eckerson House by the Historic American Buildings Survey (HABS) in 1937. The house was added to the National Register of Historic Places on January 10, 1983, for its significance in architecture. It was listed as part of the Early Stone Houses of Bergen County Multiple Property Submission (MPS).

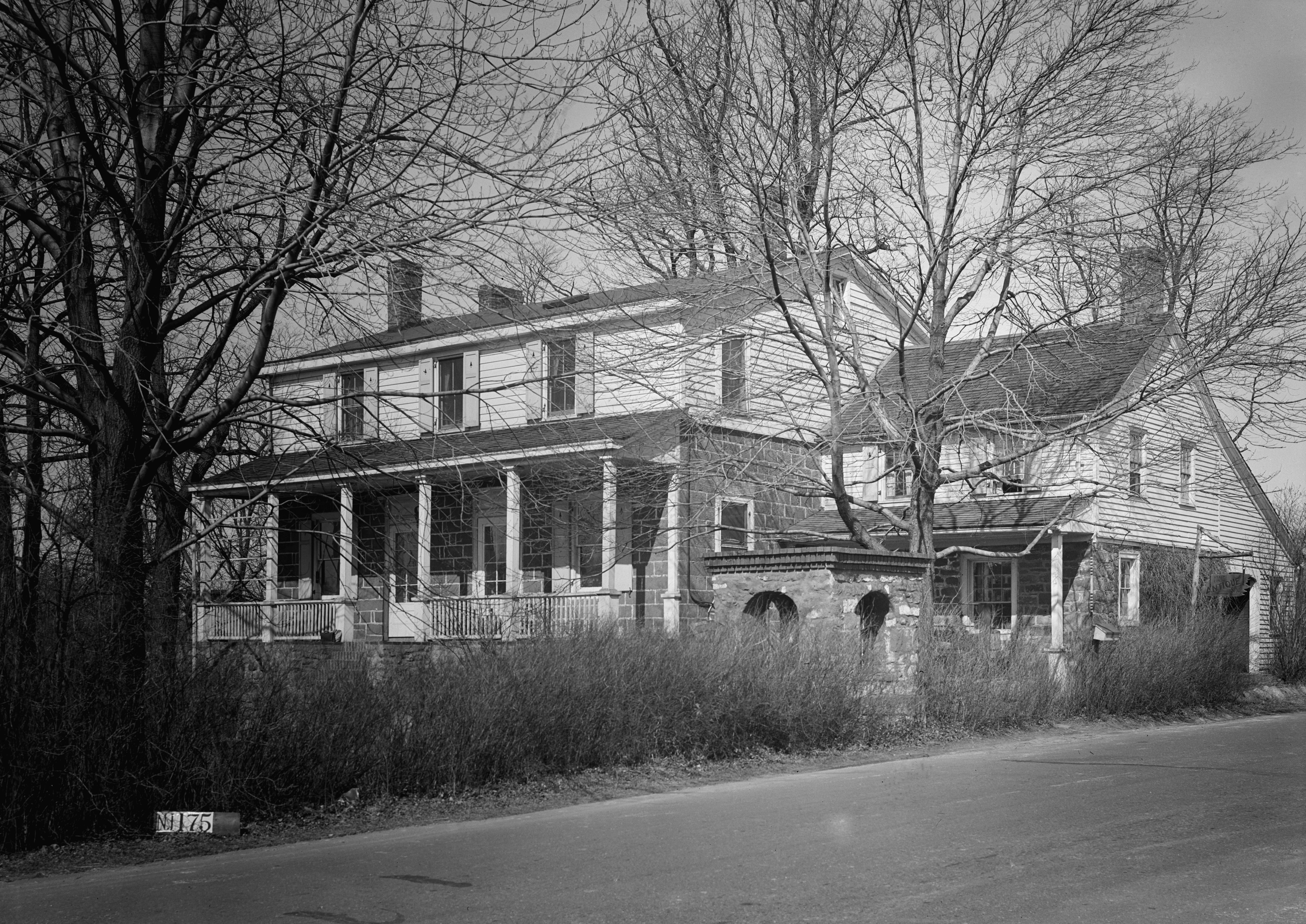
HABS photo from 1937

== See also ==
- National Register of Historic Places listings in Bergen County, New Jersey
