= Concklin–Sneden House =

Historic house in New Jersey, US

- U.S. National Register of Historic Places
- New Jersey Register of Historic Places
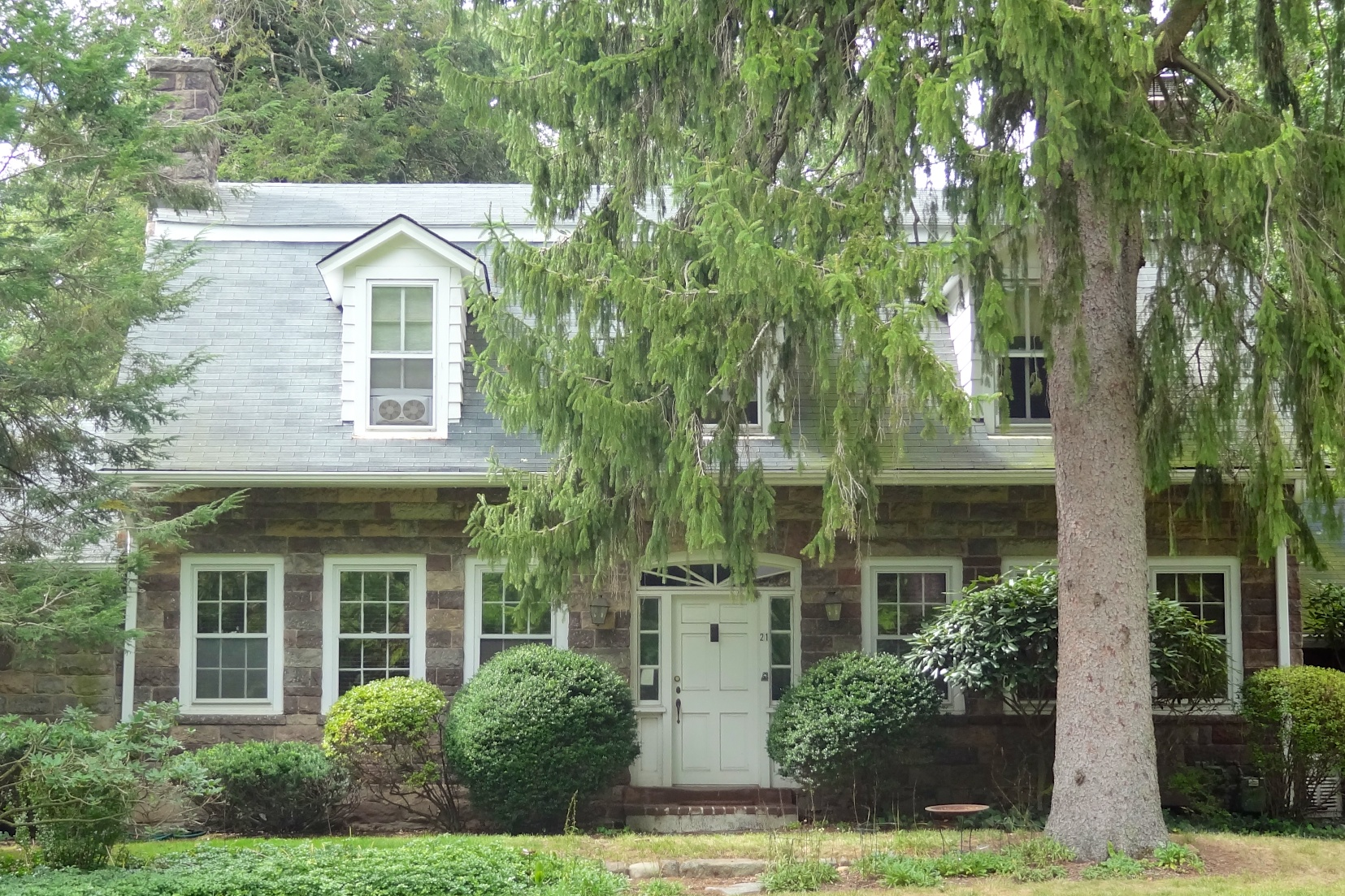

- Location within Bergen County, New Jersey Location within New Jersey Location within the United States
- Location: 21 Rockleigh Road, Rockleigh, New Jersey
- Coordinates: 41°0′11″N 73°55′38″W
- Area: 2.8 acres (1.1 ha)
- Built: c. 1796
- Architects: Concklin, Jacob; Sneden, Samuel
- MPS: Stone Houses of Bergen County TR
- NRHP reference No.: 83001484
- NJRHP No.: 660

Significant dates
- Added to NRHP: January 10, 1983
- Designated NJRHP: October 3, 1980

The Concklin–Sneden House is located in Rockleigh, Bergen County, New Jersey, United States. The house was built in 1796 and was added to the National Register of Historic Places on January 10, 1983.

Built about 1796 by Jacob Concklin Jr., a "wheelwright", the house is an example of Dutch Colonial architecture. Erected on the site of an earlier Conklin homestead, it stands on a 166 ½ acre farm purchased in 1748 by Jacob Conklin Sr. Later owners, all descendants of Conklin's, were the Samuel Sneden and Samuel Beasley families who lived here until 1902. The house since has been enlarged and remodeled.

The dwelling is a spacious, rectangular, five-bay, 1½ story gambrel-roof sandstone structure. The architectural style is "Dutch Colonial" with a gambrel roof. The side and rear walls are the original. The exterior sandstone front wall was refaced circa 1961. A small one-story sandstone wing on the south side of the main structure houses the present-day kitchen. A similar sandstone wing on the north side has been converted into a garage.

The front door opens into a center hall which traverses the dwelling to a rear door. There were one or two rooms on each side of the center hall. The main floor includes living room, dining room and small rear chamber. The garret above is finished into four bedrooms and two baths. The house has its original floorboards. Above the eaves the gable ends are clapboard. The large open garret was divided into rooms. Later alterations include front dormers, additional windows on the front facade, exterior chimney, and a full-length rear shed dormer.

The cellar, fully excavated, was another large, open space and at each end were stone arches to support the weight of the fireplaces and chimneys above. Access to the cellar, for storage of crops, was by way of two outside hatchways (since removed) built into the front foundation.

The present south wing is a modern addition that partially stands over a previous smaller wing (possibly dating to circa 1750) of which only he cellar excavation remains. The original small wing may have served as the kitchen for the main house. This small wing also may have been the older original structure before the main house was built circa 1796.

Sited in an easterly direction on two acres of land on the west side of lower Rockleigh Road, the dwelling is in good condition.

In recent times, the facade was altered by placing three windows at each side of the entrance. In addition, the sandstone wall was refaced, probably "in situ", from the usual smooth dressed stone to what is now "rock-faced". Roof dormers were added as well as a rear addition which widened the original structure.

== See also ==
- National Register of Historic Places listings in Bergen County, New Jersey
