= Derick Banta House =

Historic house in New Jersey, US

- U.S. National Register of Historic Places
- New Jersey Register of Historic Places
- Location within Bergen County, New Jersey Location within New Jersey Location within the United States
- Location: 180 Washington Avenue, Dumont, New Jersey
- Coordinates: 40°56′30″N 73°59′39″W
- Built: 1780
- Architects: Banta, Derick
- MPS: Stone Houses of Bergen County TR
- NRHP reference No.: 83001461
- NJRHP No.: 456

Significant dates
- Added to NRHP: January 9, 1983
- Designated NJRHP: October 3, 1980

Derick Banta House is a historic house located in Dumont, Bergen County, New Jersey, United States. The house was built in 1780 and was added to the National Register of Historic Places on January 9, 1983.

== See also ==
- National Register of Historic Places listings in Bergen County, New Jersey
