= Forshee-Van Orden House =

Historic house in New Jersey, United States

- U.S. National Register of Historic Places
- New Jersey Register of Historic Places
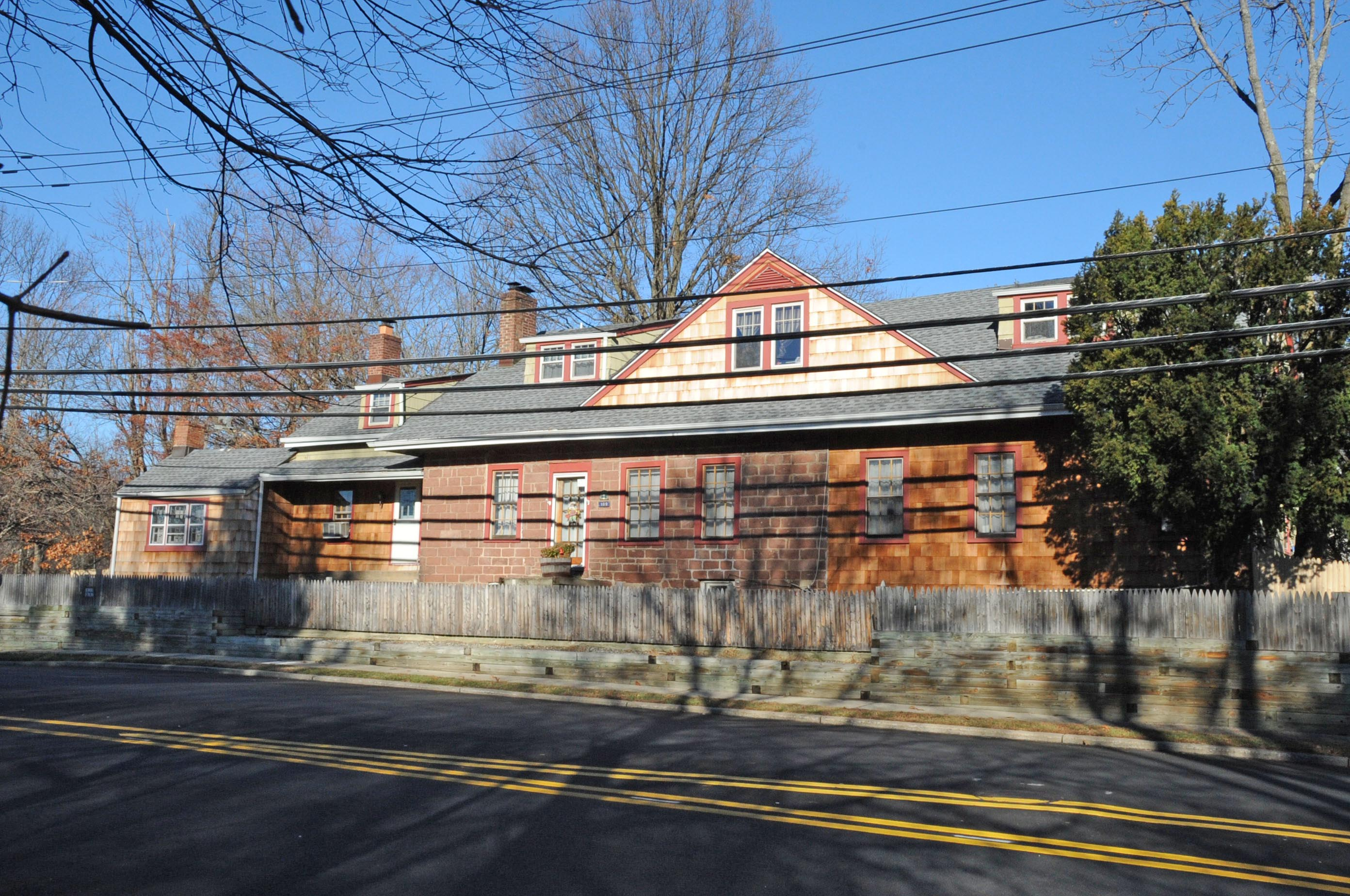

- Location within Bergen County, New Jersey Location within New Jersey Location within the United States
- Location: 109 Summit Avenue, Montvale, New Jersey
- Coordinates: 41°3′34″N 74°3′27″W
- Area: 6 acres (2.4 ha)
- Built: 1765
- Architects: Forshee, Barent
- MPS: Stone Houses of Bergen County TR
- NRHP reference No.: 84002563
- NJRHP No.: 581

Significant dates
- Added to NRHP: July 24, 1984
- Designated NJRHP: October 3, 1980

Forshee-Van Orden House is located in Montvale, Bergen County, New Jersey, United States. The house was built in 1765 and was added to the National Register of Historic Places on July 24, 1984.

== See also ==
- National Register of Historic Places listings in Bergen County, New Jersey
