= National Register of Historic Places listings in Bergen County, New Jersey =

Location of Bergen County in New Jersey

List of the National Register of Historic Places listings in Bergen County, New Jersey

Contents: Counties and communities in New Jersey
Atlantic – Bergen (Closter, Franklin Lakes, Ridgewood, Saddle River, Wyckoff) – Burlington – Camden – Cape May – Cumberland – Essex – Gloucester – Hudson – Hunterdon – Mercer – Middlesex – Monmouth – Morris – Ocean – Passaic – Salem – Somerset – Sussex – Union – Warren

This is intended to be a complete list of properties and districts listed on the National Register of Historic Places in Bergen County, New Jersey, except for those in the communities of Closter, Franklin Lakes, Ridgewood, Saddle River and Wyckoff, which are listed separately. Latitude and longitude coordinates of the sites listed on this page may be displayed in an online map.

This National Park Service list is complete through NPS recent listings posted November 6, 2026.

== Current listings ==
	Name on the Register	Image	Date listed	Location	City or town	Description
1	Ackerman–Demarest House	Ackerman–Demarest House	January 10, 1983 (#83001454)	605 E. Saddle River Road; 40°59′30″N 74°05′17″W	Ho-Ho-Kus	Part of the Early Stone Houses of Bergen County Multiple Property Submission (MPS)
2	Ackerman–Hopper House	Ackerman–Hopper House	January 9, 1983 (#83001455)	652 Ackerman Avenue; 40°57′38″N 74°06′58″W	Glen Rock	Part of the Early Stone Houses of Bergen County MPS
3	Ackerman–Zabriskie–Steuben House	Ackerman–Zabriskie–Steuben House	January 10, 1983 (#83001457)	1209 Main Street; 40°54′46″N 74°01′55″W	River Edge	Part of the Early Stone Houses of Bergen County MPS
4	John G. Ackerson House	John G. Ackerson House	January 10, 1983 (#83001458)	142 Pascack Rd. 41°02′14″N 74°02′27″W	Park Ridge	
5	Alcoa Edgewater Works	Alcoa Edgewater Works	August 10, 1978 (#78001735)	700 River Rd. 40°49′12″N 73°58′46″W	Edgewater	Demolished.
6	Anderson Outkitchen	Anderson Outkitchen	August 8, 1985 (#85002591)	18 E. Camden St. 40°53′15″N 74°02′25″W	Hackensack	
7	Fridolin Arnault House	Fridolin Arnault House	December 23, 2009 (#09001153)	111 First St. 40°50′44″N 74°05′13″W	Wood-Ridge	
8	David Baldwin House	David Baldwin House	January 10, 1983 (#83001459)	60 Lake Ave. 40°58′56″N 74°08′16″W	Midland Park	
9	Derick Banta House	Derick Banta House	January 9, 1983 (#83001461)	180 Washington Ave. 40°56′30″N 73°59′39″W	Dumont	
10	John Banta House	John Banta House	January 9, 1983 (#83001462)	211 Pascack Rd. 41°00′29″N 74°03′23″W	Hillsdale	
11	Banta-Coe House	Banta-Coe House	January 10, 1983 (#83001460)	884 Lone Pine Lane; 40°53′40″N 74°01′57″W	Teaneck	
12	John Bartholf House	John Bartholf House	January 9, 1983 (#83001463)	1122 Ramapo Valley Rd. 41°03′22″N 74°12′52″W	Mahwah	
13	Beauclaire-Vreeland House	Beauclaire-Vreeland House	January 9, 1983 (#83001464)	88 E. Clinton Ave. 40°55′25″N 73°59′37″W	Bergenfield	
14	John G. Benson House	John G. Benson House	January 9, 1983 (#83001465)	60 Grand Avenue; 40°53′27″N 73°58′30″W	Englewood	Part of the Early Stone Houses of Bergen County MPS
15	G. V. H. Berdan House	G. V. H. Berdan House	January 9, 1983 (#83001466)	1219 River Rd. 40°55′53″N 74°07′56″W	Fair Lawn	
16	Richard J. Berdan House	Richard J. Berdan House	January 9, 1983 (#83001467)	24-07 Fair Lawn Ave. 40°56′23″N 74°07′11″W	Fair Lawn	
17	Bergen County Court House Complex	Bergen County Court House Complex	January 11, 1983 (#83001468)	Court, Main and Essex Sts. 40°52′41″N 74°02′38″W	Hackensack	
18	BINGHAMTON (ferryboat)	BINGHAMTON (ferryboat)	July 9, 1982 (#82003262)	725 River Rd. 40°49′10″N 73°58′33″W	Edgewater	
19	Blackledge-Gair House	Blackledge-Gair House	January 9, 1983 (#83001469)	111 Madison Ave. 40°56′31″N 73°58′04″W	Cresskill	
20	Blackledge–Kearney House	Blackledge–Kearney House	July 24, 1984 (#84002537)	Alpine Landing; 40°56′49″N 73°55′08″W	Alpine	Part of the Early Stone Houses of Bergen County MPS
21	Capt. Thomas Blanch House	Capt. Thomas Blanch House	January 10, 1983 (#83001470)	130 Tappan Rd. 40°59′39″N 73°57′55″W	Norwood	Destroyed by fire in 1997.
22	Blanch–Haring House	Blanch–Haring House	January 9, 1983 (#83001471)	341 Lafayette Road; 40°59′27″N 73°58′33″W	Harrington Park	Part of the Early Stone Houses of Bergen County MPS
23	Blauvelt House	Blauvelt House	January 9, 1983 (#83001473)	622 Lafayette Road; 41°00′00″N 73°58′29″W	Harrington Park	Part of the Early Stone Houses of Bergen County MPS
24	Blauvelt House	Blauvelt House	January 10, 1983 (#83001474)	54 Tappan Road; 40°59′33″N 73°57′59″W	Norwood	Part of the Early Stone Houses of Bergen County MPS
25	Blauvelt–Demarest House	Blauvelt–Demarest House	January 9, 1983 (#83001472)	230 Broadway; 41°00′25″N 74°02′28″W	Hillsdale	Part of the Early Stone Houses of Bergen County MPS
26	Bogert House	Bogert House	January 9, 1983 (#83001475)	4 Lynn Court; 40°53′00″N 74°01′58″W	Bogota	Part of the Early Stone Houses of Bergen County MPS
27	Bogert House	Bogert House	January 9, 1983 (#83001476)	324 County Rd. 40°57′43″N 73°57′39″W	Demarest	
28	Isaac Bogert House	Isaac Bogert House	January 10, 1983 (#83001477)	640 Campgaw Rd. 41°02′18″N 74°11′16″W	Mahwah	
29	John Jacob Bogert House	John Jacob Bogert House	November 26, 2004 (#04001259)	163 Bogert's Mill Rd. 40°59′05″N 73°59′33″W	Harrington Park	
30	Brinkerhoff House	Brinkerhoff House	July 24, 1984 (#84002541)	231 Hackensack Ave. 40°50′52″N 74°04′56″W	Wood-Ridge	
31	Brinkerhoff–Demarest House	Brinkerhoff–Demarest House	January 10, 1983 (#83001478)	493 Teaneck Road; 40°52′34″N 74°00′43″W	Teaneck	Part of the Early Stone Houses of Bergen County MPS
32	Cadmus House	Cadmus House	July 24, 1984 (#84002544)	264 Glen Rd. 41°02′08″N 74°03′58″W	Woodcliff Lake	
33	Cadmus-Folly House	Cadmus-Folly House	January 10, 1983 (#83001479)	19–21 Fair Lawn Ave. 40°56′19″N 74°07′24″W	Fair Lawn	
34	Campbell-Christie House	Campbell-Christie House	January 10, 1983 (#83001481)	1201 Main Street; 40°54′47″N 74°01′58″W	River Edge	Part of the Early Stone Houses of Bergen County MPS
35	Christie-Parsels House	Christie-Parsels House	January 10, 1983 (#83001482)	195 Jefferson Ave. 40°55′55″N 73°58′19″W	Tenafly	
36	Church of the Holy Communion	Church of the Holy Communion	June 23, 1988 (#88000928)	Summit Ave. 40°59′44″N 73°57′39″W	Norwood	
37	Church of the Madonna	Church of the Madonna	April 8, 1976 (#76001145)	Hoefley's Lane; 40°51′37″N 73°58′44″W	Fort Lee	
38	Civil War Drill Hall and Armory	Civil War Drill Hall and Armory	October 19, 1978 (#78001737)	130 Grand Ave. 40°51′22″N 73°59′53″W	Leonia	
39	Cole-Allaire House	Cole-Allaire House	January 10, 1983 (#83001483)	112 Prospect St. 40°51′45″N 73°59′38″W	Leonia	
40	Concklin–Sneden House	Concklin–Sneden House	January 10, 1983 (#83001484)	21 Rockleigh Road; 41°00′11″N 73°55′38″W	Rockleigh	Part of the Early Stone Houses of Bergen County MPS. Built about 1796 by Jacob Concklin, Jr.
41	Thunise & Richard Cooper House	Thunise & Richard Cooper House	September 12, 1985 (#85002182)	608–610 Brookside Ave. 40°56′55″N 74°01′53″W	Oradell	
42	Tunis R. Cooper House	Tunis R. Cooper House	September 6, 1995 (#95001046)	83 Cooper St. 40°55′50″N 74°00′09″W	Bergenfield	
43	Crim-Tice House	Crim-Tice House	January 10, 1983 (#83001485)	16 County Rd. 41°02′22″N 74°04′33″W	Woodcliff Lake	Apparently demolished.
44	Crocker-McMillin Mansion-Immaculate Conception Seminary	Crocker-McMillin Mansion-Immaculate Conception Seminary	May 23, 1997 (#96001562)	Ramapo Valley Rd., jct. of Campgaw Rd., Mahwah Township; 41°04′20″N 74°11′26″W	Ramsey	
45	Darlington Schoolhouse	Darlington Schoolhouse	March 14, 2008 (#08000175)	600 Ramapo Valley Rd. 41°04′46″N 74°11′04″W	Mahwah	
46	Isaac Debaun House	Isaac Debaun House	January 10, 1983 (#83001487)	124 Rivervale Rd. 41°01′37″N 74°01′40″W	Park Ridge	
47	Debaun–Demarest House	Debaun–Demarest House	January 10, 1983 (#83001486)	56 Spring Valley Road; 40°56′21″N 74°01′44″W	River Edge	Part of the Early Stone Houses of Bergen County MPS
48	Demarest House	Demarest House	January 10, 1983 (#83001491)	213 Ramapo Valley Road; 41°01′04″N 74°15′01″W	Oakland	Also known as the Abraham Demarest House. Part of the Early Stone Houses of Bergen County MPS
49	Demarest House	Demarest House	January 10, 1983 (#83001492)	Main Street; 40°54′47″N 74°01′54″W	River Edge	Part of the Early Stone Houses of Bergen County MPS
50	Demarest House	Demarest House	January 10, 1983 (#83001496)	268 Grove Street; 40°57′00″N 74°01′35″W	Oradell	Part of the Early Stone Houses of Bergen County MPS
51	Demarest Railroad Depot	Demarest Railroad Depot	July 7, 2004 (#04000671)	38 Park St. 40°57′31″N 73°57′48″W	Demarest	
52	Cornelius Demarest House	Cornelius Demarest House	January 10, 1983 (#83001495)	12 Rochelle Avenue; 40°53′43″N 74°04′43″W	Rochelle Park	Part of the Early Stone Houses of Bergen County MPS
53	Daniel Demarest House	Daniel Demarest House	January 9, 1983 (#83001499)	404 Washington Avenue; 40°56′53″N 73°59′27″W	Dumont	Part of the Early Stone Houses of Bergen County MPS
54	Jacobus Demarest House	Jacobus Demarest House	February 17, 1978 (#78001739)	618 River Road; 40°56′04″N 74°01′32″W	New Milford	Also known as the Jacobus DesMarest House and the Demarest–Gurd–Casey House
55	Jacobus Demarest House	Jacobus Demarest House	January 10, 1983 (#83001493)	252 Ramapo Valley Road / 3 Dogwood Drive; 41°01′08″N 74°14′53″W	Oakland	Part of the Early Stone Houses of Bergen County MPS
56	John R. Demarest House	John R. Demarest House	January 9, 1983 (#83001497)	35 County Road; 40°56′49″N 73°57′16″W	Demarest	Part of the Early Stone Houses of Bergen County MPS
57	Samuel R. Demarest House	Samuel R. Demarest House	July 24, 1984 (#84002552)	212 County Road; 40°57′20″N 73°57′44″W	Demarest	Part of the Early Stone Houses of Bergen County MPS
58	Thomas Demarest House	Thomas Demarest House	January 9, 1983 (#83001498)	370 Grand Avenue; 40°53′08″N 73°58′41″W	Englewood	Demolished May 1995. Part of the Early Stone Houses of Bergen County MPS
59	Demarest–Bloomer–Hart House	Demarest–Bloomer–Hart House	November 7, 1985 (#85002775)	147 River Edge Avenue; 40°56′06″N 74°01′41″W	New Milford	
60	Demarest–Atwood House	Demarest–Atwood House	July 24, 1984 (#84002548)	84 Jefferson Avenue; 40°56′14″N 73°58′13″W	Cresskill	Part of the Early Stone Houses of Bergen County MPS
61	Demarest–Hopper House	Demarest–Hopper House	January 10, 1983 (#83001490)	21 Breakneck Road; 41°00′03″N 74°14′46″W	Oakland	Part of the Early Stone Houses of Bergen County MPS
62	Demarest–Lyle House	Demarest–Lyle House	January 10, 1983 (#83001494)	91 W. Clinton Avenue; 40°55′30″N 73°58′13″W	Tenafly	Part of the Early Stone Houses of Bergen County MPS
63	Demott–Westervelt House	Demott–Westervelt House	January 9, 1983 (#83001500)	850 Grand Avenue; 40°53′00″N 73°58′40″W	Englewood	Part of the Early Stone Houses of Bergen County MPS
64	Doremus House	Doremus House	July 24, 1984 (#84002561)	73 Main St. 40°52′50″N 74°02′40″W	Hackensack	
65	Draw Bridge at New Bridge	Draw Bridge at New Bridge	July 5, 1989 (#89000775)	Main St. and Old New Bridge Rd. over Hackensack River; 40°54′51″N 74°01′48″W	River Edge, New Milford and Teaneck	
66	Garret J. Durie House	Garret J. Durie House	January 9, 1983 (#83001502)	371 Schraalenburgh Rd. 40°58′00″N 73°59′00″W	Haworth	
67	Garret Durie House	Garret Durie House	January 9, 1983 (#83001501)	156 Ell Rd. 41°00′03″N 74°03′25″W	Hillsdale	
68	John P. Durie House	John P. Durie House	January 9, 1983 (#83001503)	265 Schraalenburgh Rd. 40°57′49″N 73°59′01″W	Haworth	
69	Dutch Reformed Church at Romopock	Dutch Reformed Church at Romopock	September 5, 1985 (#85002000)	Island Rd. at W. Ramapo Ave. 41°05′41″N 74°09′09″W	Mahwah	
70	Dutch Reformed Church in the English Neighborhood	Dutch Reformed Church in the English Neighborhood	September 18, 1998 (#98001181)	1040 Edgewater Ave. 40°50′03″N 74°00′46″W	Ridgefield	
71	Eckerson House	Eckerson House	January 10, 1983 (#83001504)	200 Chestnut Ridge Rd. 41°04′14″N 74°04′05″W	Montvale	Part of the Early Stone Houses of Bergen County MPS
72	Edgewater Borough Hall	Edgewater Borough Hall	January 16, 2008 (#07001401)	916 River Rd. 40°49′38″N 73°58′26″W	Edgewater	
73	Edgewater Public Library	Edgewater Public Library	December 23, 2009 (#09001154)	49 Hudson Ave. 40°49′47″N 73°58′28″W	Edgewater	
74	Erie Railroad Signal Tower, Waldwick Yard	Erie Railroad Signal Tower, Waldwick Yard	December 23, 1987 (#87000847)	NE end of Bohnert Pl., W side of RR Tracks; 41°00′55″N 74°07′29″W	Waldwick	
75	Ferdon House	Ferdon House	January 10, 1983 (#83001505)	366 14th St. 40°59′18″N 73°56′32″W	Norwood	
76	Ford Motor Company Edgewater Assembly Plant	Ford Motor Company Edgewater Assembly Plant	September 15, 1983 (#83001507)	309 River Rd. 40°48′33″N 73°59′09″W	Edgewater	Demolished in 2006.
77	Forshee-Van Orden House	Forshee-Van Orden House	July 24, 1984 (#84002563)	109 Summit Ave. 41°03′34″N 74°03′27″W	Montvale	
78	Peter Garretson House	Peter Garretson House	November 19, 1974 (#74001153)	4-02 River Rd. 40°55′26″N 74°07′50″W	Fair Lawn	
79	Garret Garrison House	Garret Garrison House	January 10, 1983 (#83001508)	980 Ramapo Valley Rd. 41°03′51″N 74°12′36″W	Mahwah	
80	Gethsemane Cemetery	Gethsemane Cemetery	April 20, 1994 (#94000330)	360–370 Liberty St. 40°51′20″N 74°02′29″W	Little Ferry	
81	Hardenburgh Avenue Bridge	Hardenburgh Avenue Bridge	March 12, 2001 (#01000237)	Hardenburgh Avenue over the Tenakill Brook; 40°57′24″N 73°57′48″W	Demarest	
82	Abraham A. Haring House	Abraham A. Haring House	January 10, 1983 (#83001510)	Piermont Rd. 40°59′50″N 73°55′56″W	Rockleigh	
83	Frederick Haring House	Frederick Haring House	January 10, 1983 (#83001513)	Old Tappan and De Wolf Rds. 41°01′04″N 73°58′44″W	Old Tappan	
84	Gerrit Haring House	Gerrit Haring House	January 10, 1983 (#83001514)	224 Old Tappan Rd. 41°00′47″N 73°59′12″W	Old Tappan	
85	Nicholas Haring House	Nicholas Haring House	January 10, 1983 (#83001515)	5 Piermont Road; 40°59′45″N 73°55′53″W	Rockleigh	Part of the Early Stone Houses of Bergen County MPS
86	Teunis Haring House	Teunis Haring House	April 20, 1979 (#79001473)	70 Old Tappan Rd. 41°01′14″N 73°58′05″W	Old Tappan	
87	Haring–Blauvelt House	Haring–Blauvelt House	January 10, 1983 (#83001511)	454 Tappan Road; 41°00′47″N 73°57′07″W	Northvale	Part of the Early Stone Houses of Bergen County MPS
88	Haring–Blauvelt–Demarest House	Haring–Blauvelt–Demarest House	January 10, 1983 (#83001509)	525 Rivervale Road; 41°00′57″N 74°00′39″W	River Vale	Part of the Early Stone Houses of Bergen County MPS
89	Haring–Corning House	Haring–Corning House	August 8, 1985 (#85002589)	Rockleigh Road; 40°59′58″N 73°55′48″W	Rockleigh	Part of the Early Stone Houses of Bergen County MPS
90	Haring–DeWolf House	Haring–DeWolf House	January 10, 1983 (#83001512)	95 De Wolf Road; 41°01′28″N 73°58′42″W	Old Tappan	Part of the Early Stone Houses of Bergen County MPS
91	Haring–Vervalen House	Haring–Vervalen House	January 10, 1983 (#83001517)	200 Tappan Road; 40°59′48″N 73°57′46″W	Norwood	Part of the Early Stone Houses of Bergen County MPS. Demolished in 2013.
92	Hennion House	Hennion House	January 10, 1983 (#83001518)	54 Pleasant Ave. 41°02′53″N 74°06′35″W	Upper Saddle River	Part of the Early Stone Houses of Bergen County MPS
93	The Hermitage	The Hermitage	August 29, 1970 (#70000379)	335 N. Franklin Tpke. 41°00′24″N 74°07′10″W	Ho-Ho-Kus	
94	Hillsdale Station	Hillsdale Station	June 22, 1984 (#84002566)	Broadway and Hillsdale Ave. 41°00′09″N 74°02′28″W	Hillsdale	part of the Operating Passenger Railroad Stations TR
95	William Holdrum House	William Holdrum House	January 10, 1983 (#83001519)	606 Prospect St. 41°01′22″N 74°00′39″W	River Vale	
96	Holdrum–Van Houten House	Holdrum–Van Houten House	January 9, 1983 (#83001520)	43 Spring Valley Road; 41°03′09″N 74°03′05″W	Montvale	Part of the Early Stone Houses of Bergen County MPS
97	Hopper Gristmill Site	Hopper Gristmill Site	March 3, 1983 (#83001524)	N. Ramapo Valley Rd. at Ramapo River; 41°06′00″N 74°09′31″W	Mahwah	
98	Hopper House	Hopper House	January 10, 1983 (#83001525)	72 Hopper Farm Rd. 41°04′22″N 74°05′24″W	Upper Saddle River	Part of the Early Stone Houses of Bergen County MPS
99	Andrew H. Hopper House	Andrew H. Hopper House	January 9, 1983 (#83001521)	762 Prospect Street; 40°57′24″N 74°06′36″W	Glen Rock	Part of the Early Stone Houses of Bergen County MPS
100	Garret Hopper House	Garret Hopper House	January 9, 1983 (#83001522)	470 Prospect Street; 40°57′57″N 74°06′50″W	Glen Rock	Part of the Early Stone Houses of Bergen County MPS
101	Hendrick Hopper House	Hendrick Hopper House	January 9, 1983 (#83001526)	724 Ackerman Avenue; 40°57′32″N 74°06′48″W	Glen Rock	Part of the Early Stone Houses of Bergen County MPS
102	John Hopper House	John Hopper House	January 9, 1983 (#83001527)	231 Polifly Road; 40°52′30″N 74°03′41″W	Hackensack	Built in 1818. Part of the Early Stone Houses of Bergen County MPS
103	Hopper–Goetschius House	Hopper–Goetschius House	January 10, 1983 (#83001523)	363 E. Saddle River Road; 41°03′31″N 74°05′34″W	Upper Saddle River	Part of the Early Stone Houses of Bergen County MPS
104	Hopper–Van Horn House	Hopper–Van Horn House	April 11, 1973 (#73001079)	398 Ramapo Valley Road; 41°05′19″N 74°10′22″W	Mahwah	Part of the Early Stone Houses of Bergen County MPS
105	Peter Huyler House	Peter Huyler House	January 9, 1983 (#83001528)	50 County Rd. 40°56′10″N 73°57′23″W	Cresskill	
106	Iviswold	Iviswold	November 4, 2004 (#04001213)	223 Montross Ave. 40°49′51″N 74°06′42″W	Rutherford	
107	Kip Homestead	Kip Homestead	January 10, 1983 (#83001529)	12 Meadow Rd. 40°49′30″N 74°06′02″W	Rutherford	
108	Lozier House and Van Riper Mill	Lozier House and Van Riper Mill	October 10, 1975 (#75001119)	34 Goffle Rd. and 11 Paterson Ave. 40°59′03″N 74°08′28″W	Midland Park	
109	Garret Lydecker House	Garret Lydecker House	January 9, 1983 (#83001530)	228 Grand Avenue; 40°53′08″N 73°58′39″W	Englewood	Part of the Early Stone Houses of Bergen County MPS
110	Maywood Railroad Station	Maywood Railroad Station	May 29, 2003 (#03000487)	271 Maywood Ave. 40°53′46″N 74°03′58″W	Maywood	
111	John Meyerhoff House	John Meyerhoff House	January 9, 1983 (#83001532)	279 County Rd. 40°57′37″N 73°57′45″W	Demarest	
112	Midland School	Midland School	April 7, 1978 (#78001740)	239 W. Midland Ave. 40°57′38″N 74°05′25″W	Paramus	
113	Myers-Masker House	Myers-Masker House	January 9, 1983 (#83001533)	179 Park Ave. 41°00′03″N 74°08′53″W	Midland Park	
114	Naugle House	Naugle House	January 9, 1983 (#83001536)	42–49 Dunkerhook Rd. 40°56′44″N 74°05′58″W	Fair Lawn	
115	New Milford Plant of the Hackensack Water Company	New Milford Plant of the Hackensack Water Company	August 22, 2001 (#01000891)	New Milford Ave. 40°56′49″N 74°01′30″W	Oradell	
116	New North Reformed Low Dutch Church	New North Reformed Low Dutch Church	April 15, 1982 (#82003263)	E. Saddle River Road at Old Stone Church Road; 41°04′14″N 74°05′12″W	Upper Saddle River	Known as The Old Stone Church
117	New York, Susquehanna & Western Railroad ALCO Type S-2 Locomotive	New York, Susquehanna & Western Railroad ALCO Type S-2 Locomotive	March 19, 2010 (#09001072)	Maywood Station Museum, 271 Maywood Ave. 40°53′47″N 74°03′55″W	Maywood	
118	North Church	North Church	May 26, 1983 (#83001538)	120 Washington Ave. and 191 Washington Ave. 40°56′24″N 73°59′43″W	Dumont	Also known as Schraalenburgh North Church
119	Oradell Station	Oradell Station	June 22, 1984 (#84002575)	400 Maple Ave. 40°57′13″N 74°01′50″W	Oradell	part of the Operating Passenger Railroad Stations TR
120	Richard Outwater House	Richard Outwater House	January 9, 1983 (#83001539)	231 Hackensack St. 40°49′43″N 74°05′54″W	East Rutherford	
121	Palisades Interstate Parkway	Palisades Interstate Parkway	August 2, 1999 (#99000940)	Palisade Interstate Parkway; 40°51′29″N 73°57′40″W	Fort Lee	
122	Palisades Interstate Park	Palisades Interstate Park	October 15, 1966 (#66000890)	W bank of the Hudson River; 40°57′19″N 73°55′54″W	Fort Lee and vicinity	
123	Park Ridge Station	Park Ridge Station	June 22, 1984 (#84002577)	Hawthorne and Park Ave. 41°01′58″N 74°02′11″W	Park Ridge	part of the Operating Passenger Railroad Stations TR
124	Paulison-Christie House	Paulison-Christie House	January 10, 1983 (#83001541)	8 Homestead Pl. 40°51′10″N 74°01′39″W	Ridgefield Park	
125	Peter D. Perry House	Peter D. Perry House	January 10, 1983 (#83001542)	107 Rivervale Rd. 41°01′42″N 74°01′41″W	Park Ridge	
126	Peter P. Post House	Peter P. Post House	January 10, 1983 (#83001543)	259 Pascack Rd. 41°01′03″N 74°02′53″W	Woodcliff Lake	
127	Presbyterian Church of Norwood	Presbyterian Church of Norwood	February 1, 2006 (#05001567)	701 Broadway; 41°00′00″N 73°57′39″W	Norwood	
128	Radburn	Radburn	April 16, 1975 (#75001118)	Irregular pattern between Radburn Rd. and Erie RR. tracks 40°56′28″N 74°07′07″W	Fair Lawn	
129	Radburn-Fair Lawn Station	Radburn-Fair Lawn Station	June 22, 1984 (#84002580)	Pollitt Dr. 40°56′22″N 74°07′19″W	Fair Lawn	part of the Operating Passenger Railroad Stations TR
130	Reformed Dutch Church and Green	Reformed Dutch Church and Green	June 9, 1983 (#83001546)	42 Court St. 40°52′45″N 74°02′34″W	Hackensack	
131	Ridgewood Country Club	Ridgewood Country Club	May 29, 2015 (#14000222)	96 W. Midland Ave. 40°56′49″N 74°04′41″W	Paramus	
132	River Road School	River Road School	November 11, 1977 (#77000844)	400 Riverside Ave. 40°48′52″N 74°08′04″W	Lyndhurst	
133	Rockleigh Historic District	Rockleigh Historic District	June 29, 1977 (#77000845)	Willow Avenue, Rockleigh and Piermont Roads; 41°00′11″N 73°55′42″W	Rockleigh	
134	Romeyn-Oldis-Brinkerhoff House	Romeyn-Oldis-Brinkerhoff House	January 10, 1983 (#83001548)	279 Maywood Ave. 40°53′48″N 74°03′57″W	Maywood	
135	Romine-Van Voorhis House	Romine-Van Voorhis House	January 10, 1983 (#83001547)	306 Maywood Ave. 40°53′51″N 74°03′54″W	Maywood	
136	Rutherford Station	Rutherford Station	June 22, 1984 (#84002584)	Station Sq. 40°49′42″N 74°06′06″W	Rutherford	part of the Operating Passenger Railroad Stations TR
137	Woman's Club of Rutherford Clubhouse	Woman's Club of Rutherford Clubhouse	April 10, 2017 (#100000852)	201 Fairview Avenue; 40°49′54″N 74°06′42″W	Rutherford	
138	St. Paul's Episcopal Church	St. Paul's Episcopal Church	May 5, 2014 (#14000189)	113 Engle St. 40°53′47″N 73°58′13″W	Englewood	
139	Seven Chimneys	Seven Chimneys	August 12, 1971 (#71000494)	25 Chimney Ridge Ct. 40°58′56″N 74°03′55″W	Washington Township	Also known as the Nicholas Zabriskie House
140	Albert Smith House	Albert Smith House	January 10, 1983 (#83004870)	289 Wyckoff Ave. 41°00′43″N 74°08′42″W	Waldwick	
141	John Smith House	John Smith House	January 10, 1983 (#83001549)	290 Forest Rd. 41°01′47″N 74°09′24″W	Mahwah	
142	South Church Manse	South Church Manse	August 24, 1979 (#79001470)	138 W. Church St. 40°55′44″N 74°00′10″W	Bergenfield	
143	South Schraalenburgh Church	South Schraalenburgh Church	December 6, 1975 (#75001116)	Prospect Ave. and W. Church St. 40°55′46″N 74°00′13″W	Bergenfield	
144	Elizabeth Cady Stanton House	Elizabeth Cady Stanton House	May 15, 1975 (#75001122)	135 Highwood Ave. 40°55′33″N 73°57′16″W	Tenafly	
145	Steuben Estate Complex	Steuben Estate Complex	December 9, 1980 (#80004403)	New Bridge Road, Main Street and Hackensack River; 40°54′49″N 74°01′55″W	River Edge	Includes Ackerman–Zabriskie–Steuben House, Campbell-Christie House, and Demarest House
146	Steuben House	Steuben House	December 18, 1970 (#70000381)	Old New Bridge Rd., at the Hackensack River; 40°54′49″N 74°01′51″W	River Edge	Built in 1752.
147	Joseph Taylor House	Joseph Taylor House	January 14, 2015 (#14000464)	475 Franklin Tpk. 41°01′58″N 74°07′38″W	Allendale	aka Fell-Ackerman-Cable-Taylor House
148	Tenafly Station	Tenafly Station	January 25, 1979 (#79001476)	Off Hillside Ave. 40°55′29″N 73°57′54″W	Tenafly	
149	Terhune House	Terhune House	February 28, 1996 (#82005390)	470 Paramus Rd. 40°57′28″N 74°05′35″W	Paramus	
150	Terhune-Gardner-Lindenmeyr House	Terhune-Gardner-Lindenmeyr House	February 7, 1972 (#72000769)	218 Paramus Rd. 40°56′27″N 74°05′33″W	Paramus	
151	Terhune–Hopper House	Terhune–Hopper House	January 10, 1983 (#83001554)	825 E. Saddle River Road; 40°59′51″N 74°05′30″W	Ho-Ho-Kus	Part of the Early Stone Houses of Bergen County MPS
152	Terhune–Hopper House	Terhune–Hopper House	January 10, 1983 (#83001553)	349 W. Saddle River Road; 41°03′30″N 74°05′56″W	Upper Saddle River	Part of the Early Stone Houses of Bergen County MPS
153	Terhune–Ranlett House	Terhune–Ranlett House	January 10, 1983 (#83001555)	933 E. Saddle River Road; 41°00′05″N 74°05′36″W	Ho-Ho-Kus	Part of the Early Stone Houses of Bergen County MPS
154	Texwipe Corporation Headquarters	Texwipe Corporation Headquarters	March 7, 2025 (#100011489)	650 E. Crescent Avenue; 41°04′09″N 74°07′13″W	Upper Saddle River	Landscape architecture by James C. Rose
155	Theodore Roosevelt Monument	Theodore Roosevelt Monument	September 20, 2006 (#06000870)	Roosevelt Common, Riveredge Rd. 40°55′42″N 73°58′07″W	Tenafly	
156	U.S.S. LING	U.S.S. LING	October 19, 1978 (#78001736)	Hackensack River at 150 River St. 40°52′47″N 74°02′26″W	Hackensack	
157	Upper Closter-Alpine Historic District	Upper Closter-Alpine Historic District	May 8, 1985 (#85001013)	Roughly bounded by Forest St., Old Dock Rd., School House Ln., Church St. and Closter Dock Rd. 40°56′57″N 73°55′37″W	Alpine	
158	Edward W. Vaill House	Edward W. Vaill House	January 18, 1990 (#89001595)	863 Midland Rd. 40°57′27″N 74°02′30″W	Oradell	
159	Van Allen House	Van Allen House	July 24, 1973 (#73001080)	Corner of U.S. 202 and Franklin Ave. 41°01′47″N 74°14′11″W	Oakland	
160	Van Buskirk-Oakley House	Van Buskirk-Oakley House	July 3, 1979 (#79001474)	467 Kinderkamack Rd. 40°57′23″N 74°01′55″W	Oradell	
161	Harmon Van Dien House	Harmon Van Dien House	January 10, 1983 (#83001561)	449 Paramus Rd. 40°57′23″N 74°05′40″W	Paramus	
162	Van Gelder Studio and Home	Van Gelder Studio and Home	April 25, 2022 (#100007644)	445 Sylvan Ave. 40°52′34″N 73°57′07″W	Englewood Cliffs	
163	Abraham Van Gelder House	Abraham Van Gelder House	January 10, 1983 (#83001569)	86 W. Crescent Ave. 41°02′40″N 74°09′59″W	Mahwah	
164	David Van Gelder House	David Van Gelder House	January 10, 1983 (#83001570)	37 W. Crescent Ave. 41°02′37″N 74°09′53″W	Ramsey	
165	Van Horn–Newcomb House	Van Horn–Newcomb House	July 24, 1984 (#84002590)	303 Tenafly Road; 40°54′16″N 73°58′31″W	Englewood	Part of the Early Stone Houses of Bergen County MPS
166	Van Houten–Hillman House	Van Houten–Hillman House	January 9, 1983 (#83001575)	891 River Road; 40°53′26″N 74°07′40″W	Elmwood Park	Part of the Early Stone Houses of Bergen County MPS
167	Jacob W. Van Winkle House	Jacob W. Van Winkle House	January 10, 1983 (#83001588)	316 Riverside Ave. 40°48′59″N 74°07′57″W	Lyndhurst	
168	Van Winkle-Fox House	Van Winkle-Fox House	January 10, 1983 (#83001578)	669 Ramapo Valley Rd. 41°02′28″N 74°13′45″W	Oakland	
169	Van Zile House	Van Zile House	January 10, 1983 (#83001579)	714 Godwin Ave. 41°00′03″N 74°09′20″W	Midland Park	
170	Adam Vandelinda House	Adam Vandelinda House	January 10, 1983 (#83001562)	586 Teaneck Rd. 40°52′43″N 74°00′42″W	Teaneck	
171	James Vandelinda House	James Vandelinda House	January 10, 1983 (#83001563)	566 Teaneck Rd. 40°52′38″N 74°00′43″W	Teaneck	
172	Vanderbeck House	Vanderbeck House	January 10, 1983 (#83001565)	69 Vanderbeck Ave. 41°02′02″N 74°09′17″W	Mahwah	
173	Jacob Vanderbeck Jr. House	Jacob Vanderbeck Jr. House	January 9, 1983 (#83001566)	41-25 Dunderhook Rd. 40°56′46″N 74°06′02″W	Fair Lawn	
174	Vanderbeek House	Vanderbeek House	July 24, 1984 (#84002589)	6 Arigot Court; 41°00′20″N 74°04′22″W	Hillsdale	
175	Vreeland House	Vreeland House	November 17, 1978 (#78001738)	125 Lakeview Avenue; 40°52′26″N 73°59′06″W	Leonia	Part of the Early Stone Houses of Bergen County MPS
176	Waldwick Railroad Station	Waldwick Railroad Station	February 23, 1978 (#78001742)	Hewson Ave. and Prospect St. 41°00′44″N 74°07′26″W	Waldwick	Original 1887 depot to be restored for use as local museum
177	Westervelt House	Westervelt House	August 15, 1983 (#83001586)	81 Westervelt Ave. 40°55′17″N 73°58′08″W	Tenafly	
178	Benjamin P. Westervelt House	Benjamin P. Westervelt House	January 9, 1983 (#83001583)	235 County Rd. 40°56′33″N 73°57′27″W	Cresskill	
179	Caspar Westervelt House	Caspar Westervelt House	January 10, 1983 (#83001584)	20 Sherwood Rd. 40°52′09″N 74°00′54″W	Teaneck	
180	John Westervelt House	John Westervelt House	January 9, 1983 (#83001585)	29 The Parkway; 40°59′11″N 73°58′33″W	Harrington Park	Part of the Early Stone Houses of Bergen County MPS
181	Westervelt–Ackerson House	Westervelt–Ackerson House	July 20, 1977 (#77000846)	538 Island Road; 41°04′25″N 74°08′39″W	Ramsey	
182	Westervelt–Lydecker House	Westervelt–Lydecker House	January 10, 1983 (#83001582)	Weirmus and Old Mill Roads; 41°01′18″N 74°03′57″W	Woodcliff Lake	
183	Westwood Railroad Station	Westwood Railroad Station	January 28, 2020 (#100003609)	Broadway & Westwood Ave. 40°59′27″N 74°01′58″W	Westwood	1870 stone building
184	White Tenant House	White Tenant House	January 10, 1983 (#83001587)	16 White's Lane; 41°00′23″N 74°07′38″W	Waldwick	Demolished.
185	William Carlos Williams House	William Carlos Williams House	June 4, 1973 (#73001082)	9 Ridge Rd. 40°50′00″N 74°06′30″W	Rutherford	
186	William A. Wittmer Lustron House	William A. Wittmer Lustron House	July 25, 2000 (#00000797)	19 Dubois Avenue; 40°56′50″N 73°55′44″W	Alpine	Part of the Lustrons in New Jersey MPS
187	Woman's Club of Englewood	Woman's Club of Englewood	September 29, 2025 (#100012317)	187 Brinkerhoff Court; 40°53′28″N 73°58′01″W	Englewood	
188	World War I Monument	World War I Monument	April 24, 2013 (#13000201)	Intersection of Park Avenue, Chestnut Street and Passaic Avenue and Lincoln Ave., Rutherford Borough; 40°49′34″N 74°06′26″W	Rutherford	
189	Wortendyke Barn	Wortendyke Barn	May 7, 1973 (#73001081)	13 Pascack Rd. 41°01′43″N 74°02′45″W	Park Ridge	Now a county museum.
190	Frederick Wortendyke House	Frederick Wortendyke House	January 10, 1983 (#83001591)	168 Pascack Rd. 41°01′16″N 74°02′56″W	Woodcliff Lake	
191	Frederick Wortendyke House	Frederick Wortendyke House	January 10, 1983 (#83001592)	12 Pascack Rd. 41°01′43″N 74°02′46″W	Park Ridge	
192	Jacob Wortendyke House	Jacob Wortendyke House	January 10, 1983 (#83001593)	445 Chestnut Ridge; 41°02′30″N 74°04′28″W	Woodcliff Lake	Apparently demolished.
193	Wortendyke-Demund House	Wortendyke-Demund House	January 10, 1983 (#83001590)	57 Demund Lane; 40°59′45″N 74°08′43″W	Midland Park	
194	Jeremiah J. Yeareance House	Jeremiah J. Yeareance House	April 3, 1986 (#86000628)	410 Riverside Ave. 40°48′51″N 74°08′05″W	Lyndhurst	
195	Yereance-Berry House	Yereance-Berry House	January 10, 1983 (#83001594)	91 Crane Ave. 40°48′56″N 74°06′16″W	Rutherford	
196	Zabriskie House	Zabriskie House	January 10, 1983 (#83001598)	Franklin Turnpike & Sheridan Ave. 40°59′51″N 74°06′37″W	Ho-Ho-Kus	
197	Zabriskie Tenant House	Zabriskie Tenant House	July 24, 1984 (#84002602)	273 Dunkerhook Rd. 40°56′53″N 74°05′50″W	Paramus	Demolished in 2012.
198	Albert J. Zabriskie Farmhouse	Albert J. Zabriskie Farmhouse	November 7, 1977 (#77000847)	7 E. Ridgewood Ave. 40°58′12″N 74°04′39″W	Paramus	Some listings misreport this location as Ridgewood, NJ.
199	Garret Zabriskie House	Garret Zabriskie House	January 9, 1983 (#83001596)	317 Massachusetts Ave. 40°57′19″N 73°59′25″W	Haworth	
200	Henry Zabriskie House	Henry Zabriskie House	January 9, 1983 (#83001597)	58 Schraalenburgh Rd. 40°57′25″N 73°59′05″W	Haworth	
201	Zabriskie-Christie House	Zabriskie-Christie House	January 9, 1983 (#83001595)	2 Colonial Court; 40°56′32″N 74°00′27″W	Dumont	
202	Zabriskie-Kipp-Cadmus House	Zabriskie-Kipp-Cadmus House	December 13, 1978 (#78001741)	664 River Rd. 40°53′17″N 74°01′55″W	Teaneck	

== Former listings ==
	Name on the Register	Image	Date listed	Date removed	Location	City or town	Description
1	Anderson Street Station	Anderson Street Station	June 22, 1984 (#84002520)	May 18, 2011	Anderson St. 40°53′39″N 74°02′40″W	Hackensack	Destroyed by fire on January 10, 2009.
