= Garret J. Durie House =

Historic house in New Jersey, United States

- U.S. National Register of Historic Places
- New Jersey Register of Historic Places
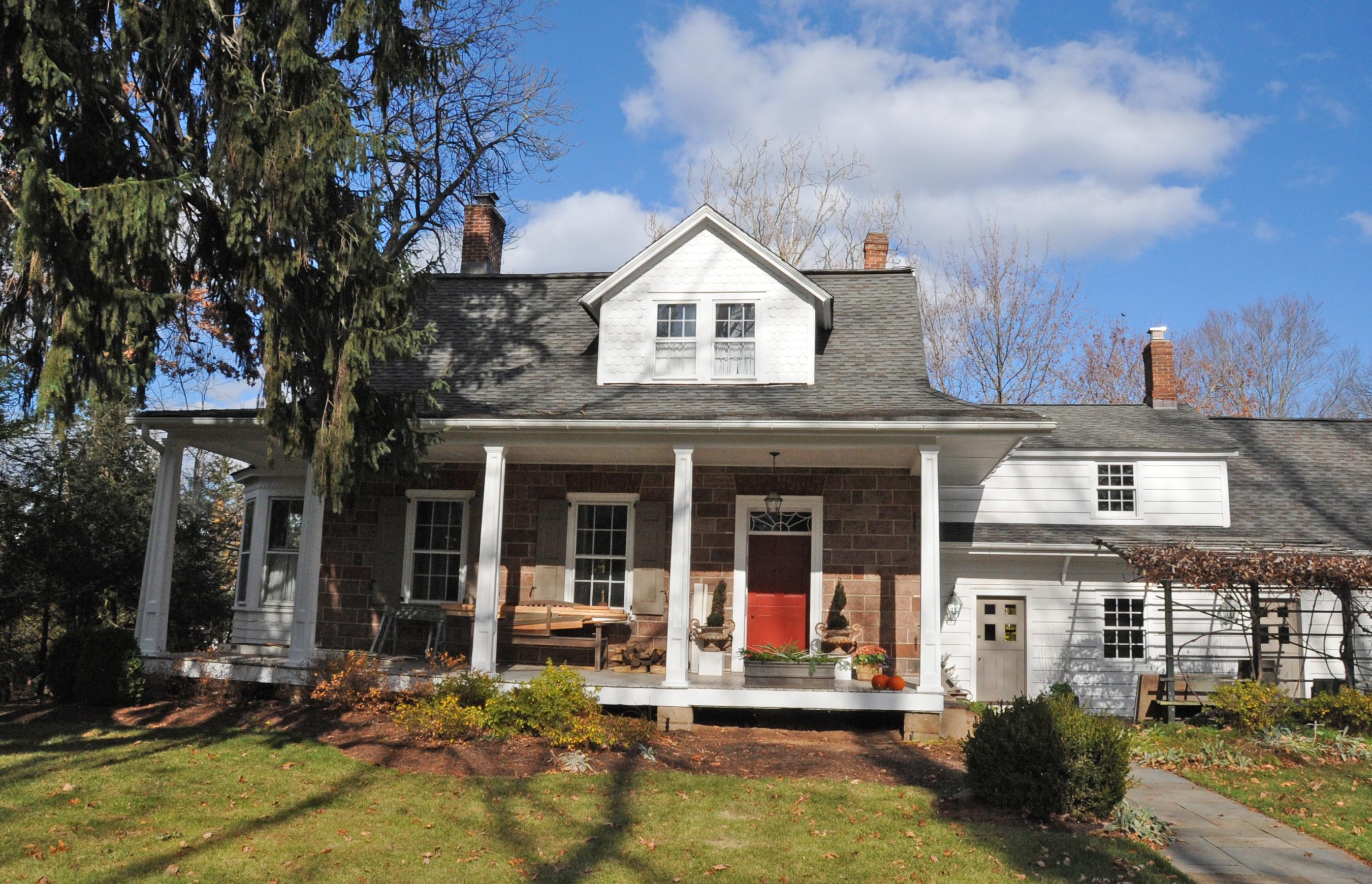
- Garret J. Durie House in 2015

- Location within Bergen County, New Jersey Location within New Jersey Location within the United States
- Location: 371 Schraalenburgh Road, Haworth, New Jersey
- Coordinates: 40°58′0″N 73°59′0″W
- Area: 1.3 acres (0.53 ha)
- Built: 1811
- Architects: Durie, Garret
- Architectural style: Colonial, Dutch Colonial
- MPS: Stone Houses of Bergen County TR
- NRHP reference No.: 83001502
- NJRHP No.: 530

Significant dates
- Added to NRHP: January 9, 1983
- Designated NJRHP: October 3, 1980

Garret J. Durie House is located in Haworth, Bergen County, New Jersey, United States. The house was built in 1811 and was added to the National Register of Historic Places on January 9, 1983.

== See also ==
- National Register of Historic Places listings in Bergen County, New Jersey
