= James Vandelinda House =

Historic house in New Jersey, United States

- U.S. National Register of Historic Places
- New Jersey Register of Historic Places
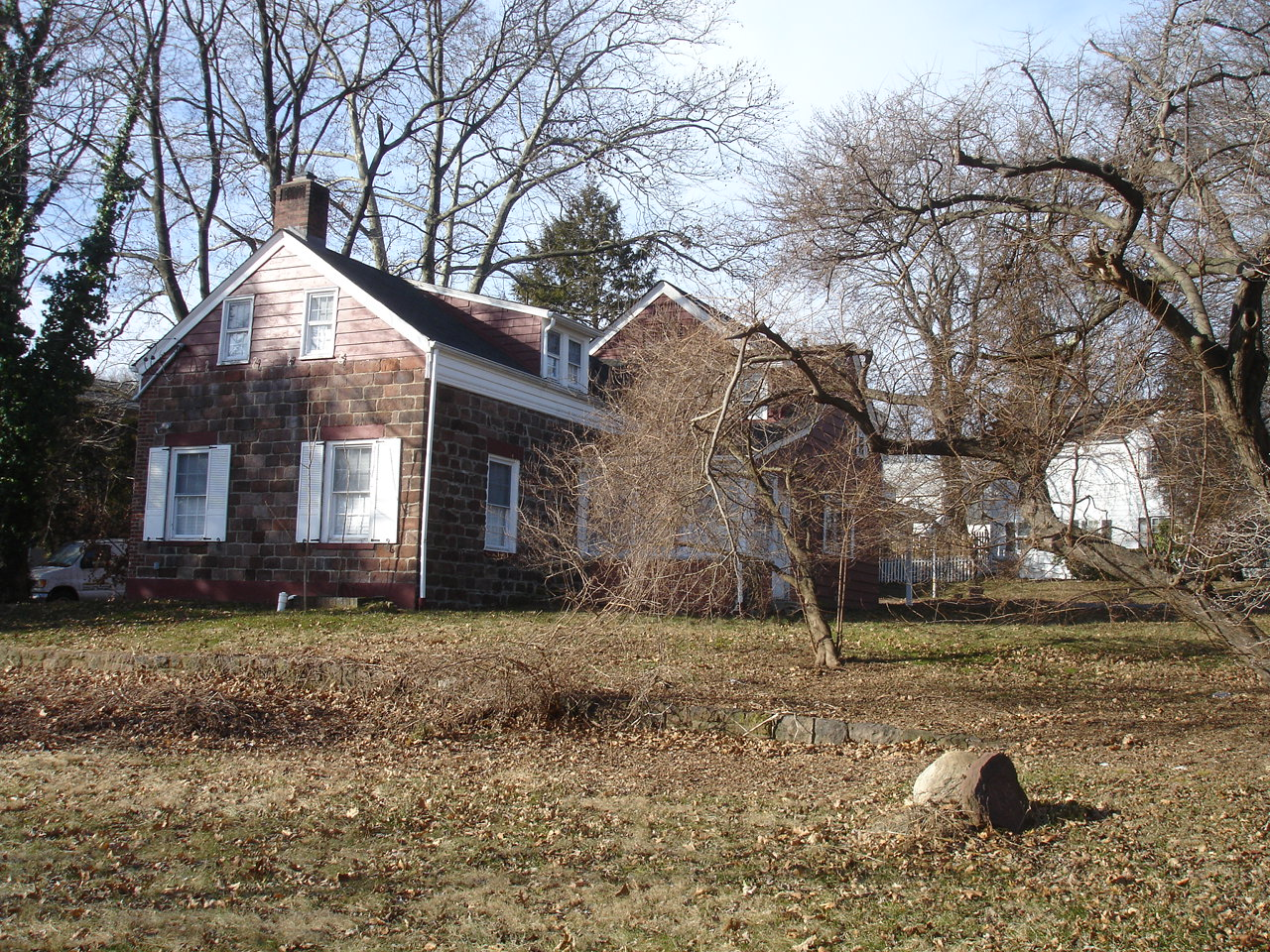
- The James Vandelinda House in 2012

- Location within Bergen County, New Jersey Location within New Jersey Location within the United States
- Location: 566 Teaneck Road, Teaneck, New Jersey
- Coordinates: 40°52′38″N 74°0′43″W
- Area: less than one acre
- Built: 1805
- Built by: James Vandelinda
- MPS: Stone Houses of Bergen County TR
- NRHP reference No.: 83001563
- NJRHP No.: 700

Significant dates
- Added to NRHP: January 10, 1983
- Designated NJRHP: October 3, 1980

James Vandelinda House is located in Teaneck, Bergen County, New Jersey, United States. The house was built in 1805 and was added to the National Register of Historic Places on January 10, 1983.

== See also ==
- National Register of Historic Places listings in Bergen County, New Jersey
