= Isaac Bogert House =

Historic house in New Jersey, US

- U.S. National Register of Historic Places
- New Jersey Register of Historic Places
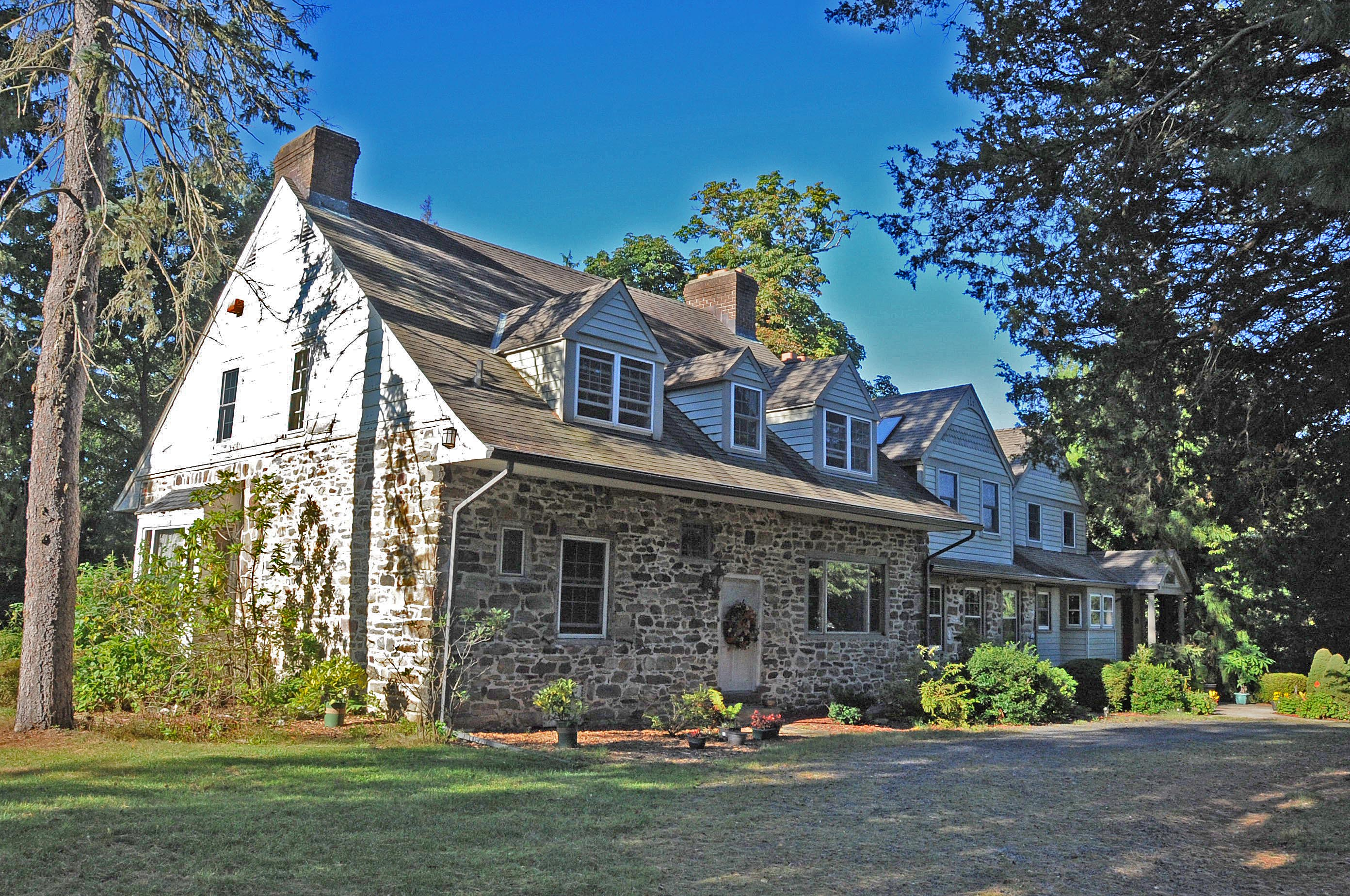
- Isaac Bogert House, seen in 2015

- Location within New Jersey Location within the United States
- Location: 640 Campgaw Rd., Mahwah, New Jersey
- Coordinates: 41°02′18″N 74°11′16″W
- Area: 7.1 acres (2.9 ha)
- MPS: Stone Houses of Bergen County TR
- NRHP reference No.: 83001477
- NJRHP No.: 436

Significant dates
- Added to NRHP: January 10, 1983
- Designated NJRHP: October 3, 1980

Isaac Bogert House, also known as Melody Farms, is a historic Dutch Colonial farmhouse located at 640 Campgaw Road in Mahwah, Bergen County, New Jersey. Since 1983, it is listed in the United States National Register of Historic Places and protected by the Mahwah municipality's historic preservation ordinance (Ordinance 1313) from suburban development transformation.

== History ==
In 1730, the original part of the house was constructed by Isaac Bogert, a member of a Dutch immigrant family that settled in northern New Jersey in the 17th century. The Bogert family were early settlers in the Mahwah area and purchased farmland. The house is considered as a relic of American colonial-era architecture that reflects a common building style for European settlers in what would become the northeastern United States.

The house and adjacent land were owned by Isaac Bogert's descendants for more than 200 years, being sold to the Hackensack Land Company in 1889. The house's ownership changed hands several times among individual and corporate owners over the next few decades, including use as a dairy farms under the Melody Farms brand. It eventually was acquired by the Township of Mahwah.

== See also ==
- National Register of Historic Places listings in Bergen County, New Jersey
