= Capt. Thomas Blanch House =

Destroyed house in New Jersey, US

- U.S. National Register of Historic Places
- New Jersey Register of Historic Places
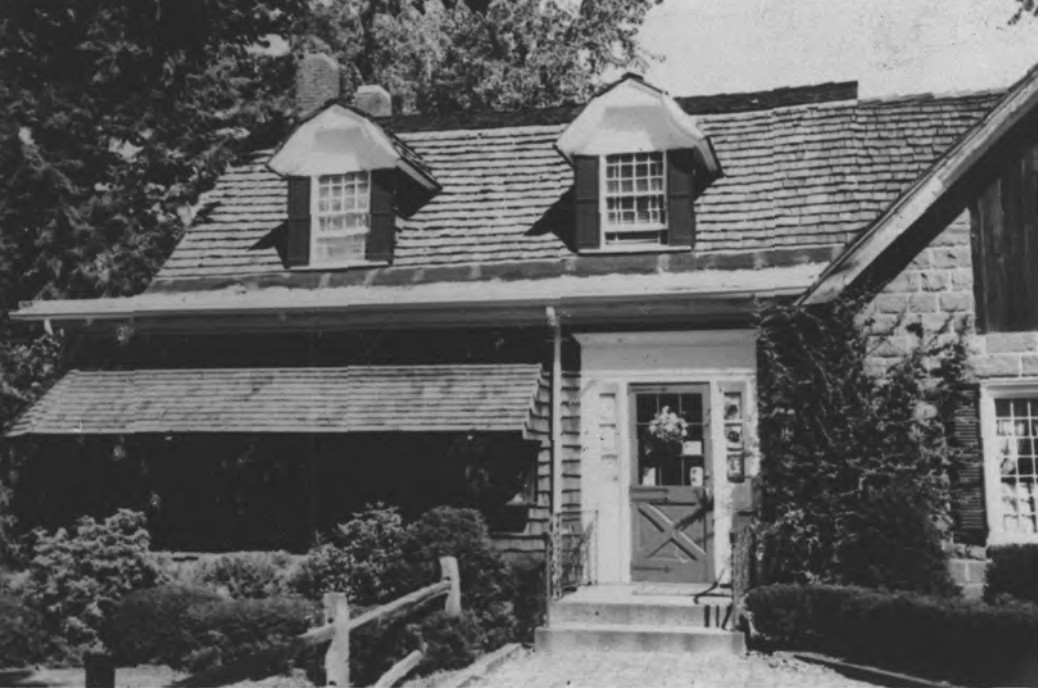
- c. 1983 photo

- Location within Bergen County, New Jersey Location within New Jersey Location within the United States
- Location: 130 Tappan Road, Norwood, New Jersey
- Coordinates: 40°59′39″N 73°57′55″W
- Area: 1.8 acres (0.73 ha)
- Built: 1790
- MPS: Stone Houses of Bergen County TR
- NRHP reference No.: 83001470
- NJRHP No.: 590

Significant dates
- Added to NRHP: January 10, 1983
- Designated NJRHP: October 3, 1980

The Capt. Thomas Blanch House was a historic house at 130 Tappan Road in Norwood, Bergen County, New Jersey, United States. The house was built in 1790 and was added to the National Register of Historic Places on January 10, 1983. The house was destroyed by fire on May 26, 1997.

== See also ==
- National Register of Historic Places listings in Bergen County, New Jersey
