= Hopper Gristmill Site =

- U.S. National Register of Historic Places
- New Jersey Register of Historic Places
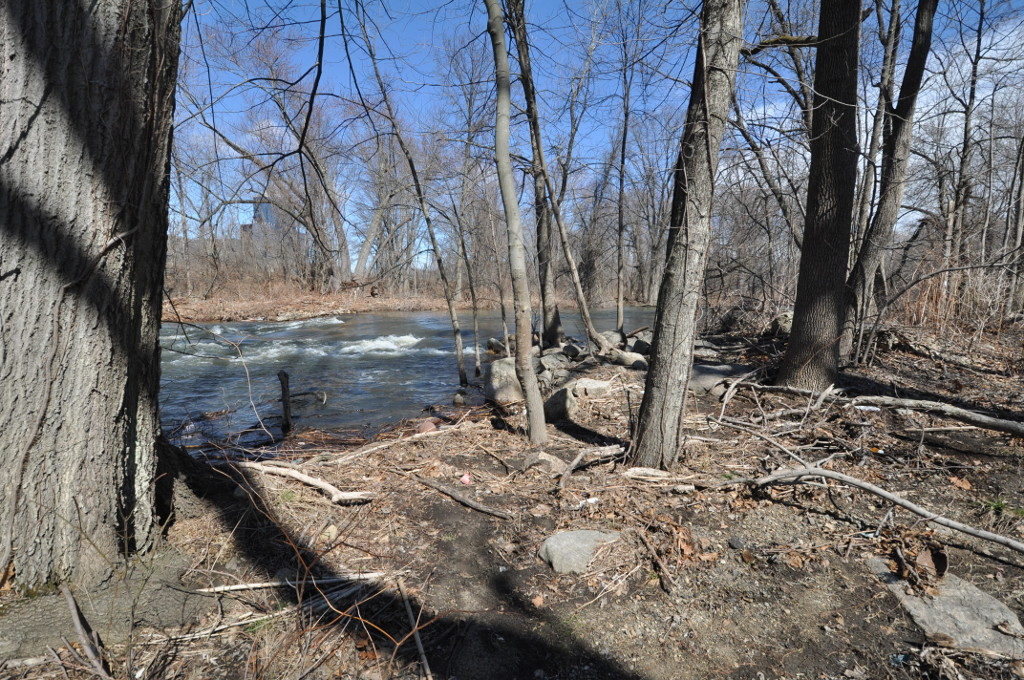
- View of the Ramapo River near the site marker

- Location within Bergen County, New Jersey Location within New Jersey Location within the United States
- Location: near 156 Ramapo Valley Rd., Mahwah, New Jersey
- Coordinates: 41°6′0″N 74°9′31″W
- Area: 0.5 acres (0.20 ha)
- Built: 1764
- NRHP reference No.: 83001524
- NJRHP No.: 564

Significant dates
- Added to NRHP: March 3, 1983
- Designated NJRHP: November 6, 1980

Hopper Gristmill Site is located near 156 Ramapo Valley Road in Mahwah, Bergen County, New Jersey, United States. The gristmill was built in 1764 and was added to the National Register of Historic Places on March 3, 1983.

== See also ==
- National Register of Historic Places listings in Bergen County, New Jersey
