= Haring House =

Haring House may refer to:

- Haring–Auryanson House, Closter, New Jersey, listed on the NRHP in Bergen County
- Blanch–Haring House, Harrington Park, New Jersey, listed on the NRHP in Bergen County
- Haring–Blauvelt House, Northvale, New Jersey, listed on the NRHP in Bergen County
- Haring–Vervalen House, Norwood, New Jersey, listed on the NRHP in Bergen County
- Frederick Haring House, Old Tappan, New Jersey, listed on the NRHP in Bergen County
- Gerrit Haring House, Old Tappan, New Jersey, listed on the NRHP in Bergen County
- Teunis Haring House, Old Tappan, New Jersey, listed on the NRHP in Bergen County
- Haring–DeWolf House, Old Tappan, New Jersey, listed on the NRHP in Bergen County
- Haring–Blauvelt–Demarest House, River Vale, New Jersey, listed on the NRHP in Bergen County
- Abraham A. Haring House, Rockleigh, New Jersey, listed on the NRHP in Bergen County
- Nicholas Haring House, Rockleigh, New Jersey, listed on the NRHP in Bergen County
- Haring–Corning House, Rockleigh, New Jersey, listed on the NRHP in Bergen County
- Haring-Eberle House, Palisades, New York, listed on the NRHP in Rockland County
