= Blauvelt House =

Blauvelt House may refer to:

- Blauvelt House (Franklin Lakes, New Jersey), listed on the National Register of Historic Places in Bergen County, New Jersey
- Blauvelt House (Harrington Park, New Jersey), listed on the National Register of Historic Places in Bergen County, New Jersey
- Blauvelt House (Norwood, New Jersey), listed on the National Register of Historic Places in Bergen County, New Jersey
- Blauvelt–Demarest House, Hillsdale, New Jersey, listed on the National Register of Historic Places in Bergen County, New Jersey
- Cairns–Whitten–Blauvelt House, Wyckoff, New Jersey, listed on the National Register of Historic Places in Bergen County, New Jersey
- Haring–Blauvelt House, Northvale, New Jersey, listed on the National Register of Historic Places in Bergen County, New Jersey
- Haring–Blauvelt–Demarest House, River Vale, New Jersey, listed on the National Register of Historic Places in Bergen County, New Jersey
- Blauvelt House (New City, New York), listed on the National Register of Historic Places in Rockland County, New York
