= Rockleigh Historic District =

Historic district in New Jersey, United States

- U.S. National Register of Historic Places
- U.S. Historic district
- New Jersey Register of Historic Places
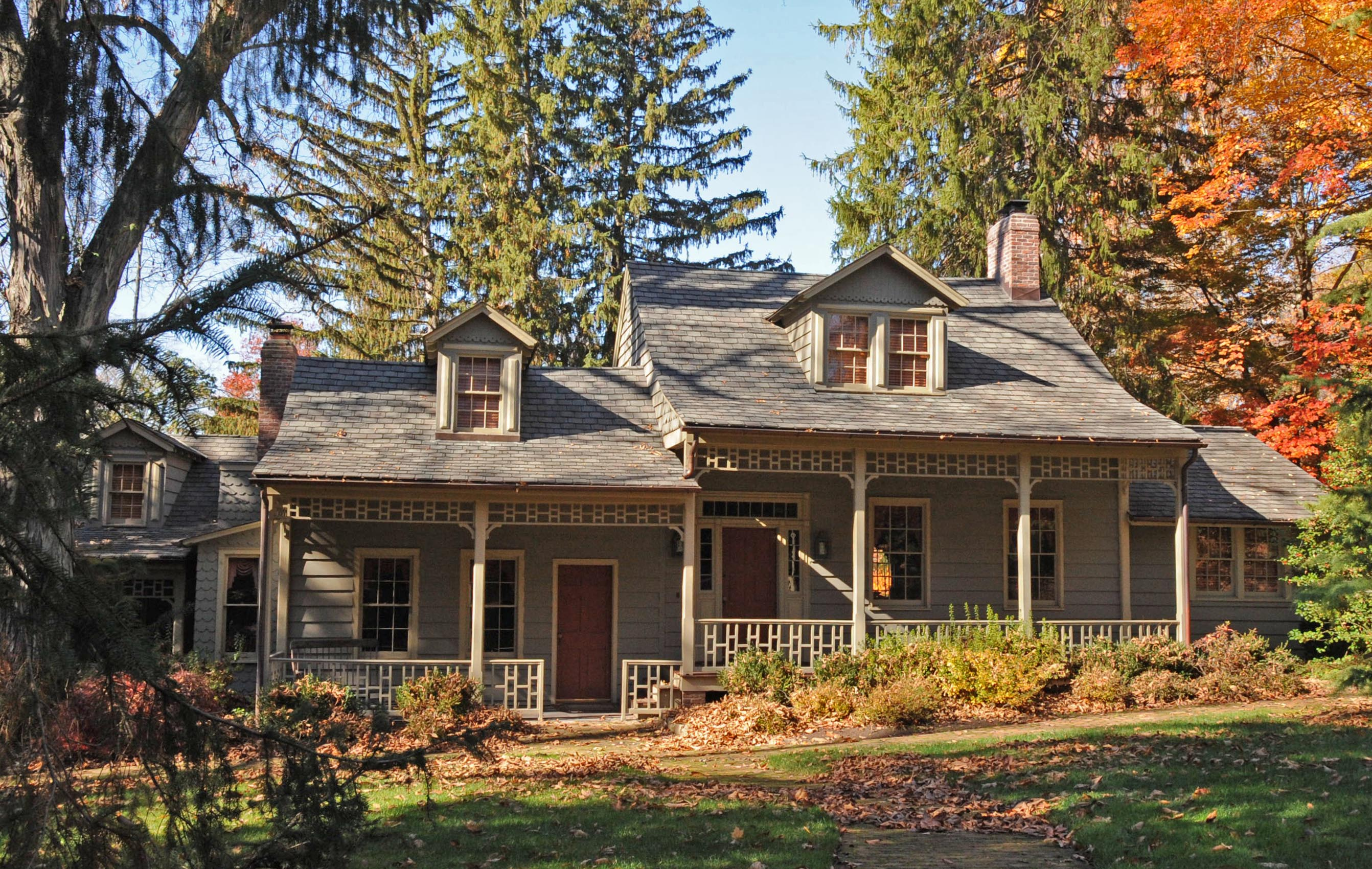
- Joseph DuBois House

- Location within Bergen County, New Jersey Location within New Jersey Location within the United States
- Location: Willow Avenue, Rockleigh and Piermont Roads, Rockleigh, New Jersey
- Coordinates: 41°0′11″N 73°55′42″W
- Area: 157 acres (64 ha)
- Architectural style: Greek Revival, Late Victorian, Colonial
- NRHP reference No.: 77000845
- NJRHP No.: 664

Significant dates
- Added to NRHP: June 29, 1977
- Designated NJRHP: July 2, 1976

The Rockleigh Historic District is a 157-acre (64 ha) historic district located along Willow Avenue, Rockleigh and Piermont Roads in the borough of Rockleigh in Bergen County, New Jersey, United States. The district was added to the National Register of Historic Places on June 29, 1977, for its significance in agriculture and architecture. The district includes 19 contributing buildings and two contributing sites. The individually listed Concklin–Sneden House, Abraham A. Haring House, Nicholas Haring House, and Haring–Corning House contribute to the district.

== History and description ==
The Joseph Dubois House was built from around 1823 to 1833. It features Victorian style on the exterior trim. The oldest section of the Jacob Haring House was built in 1820. It was extended in 1865 and features Greek Revival and Victorian architecture.

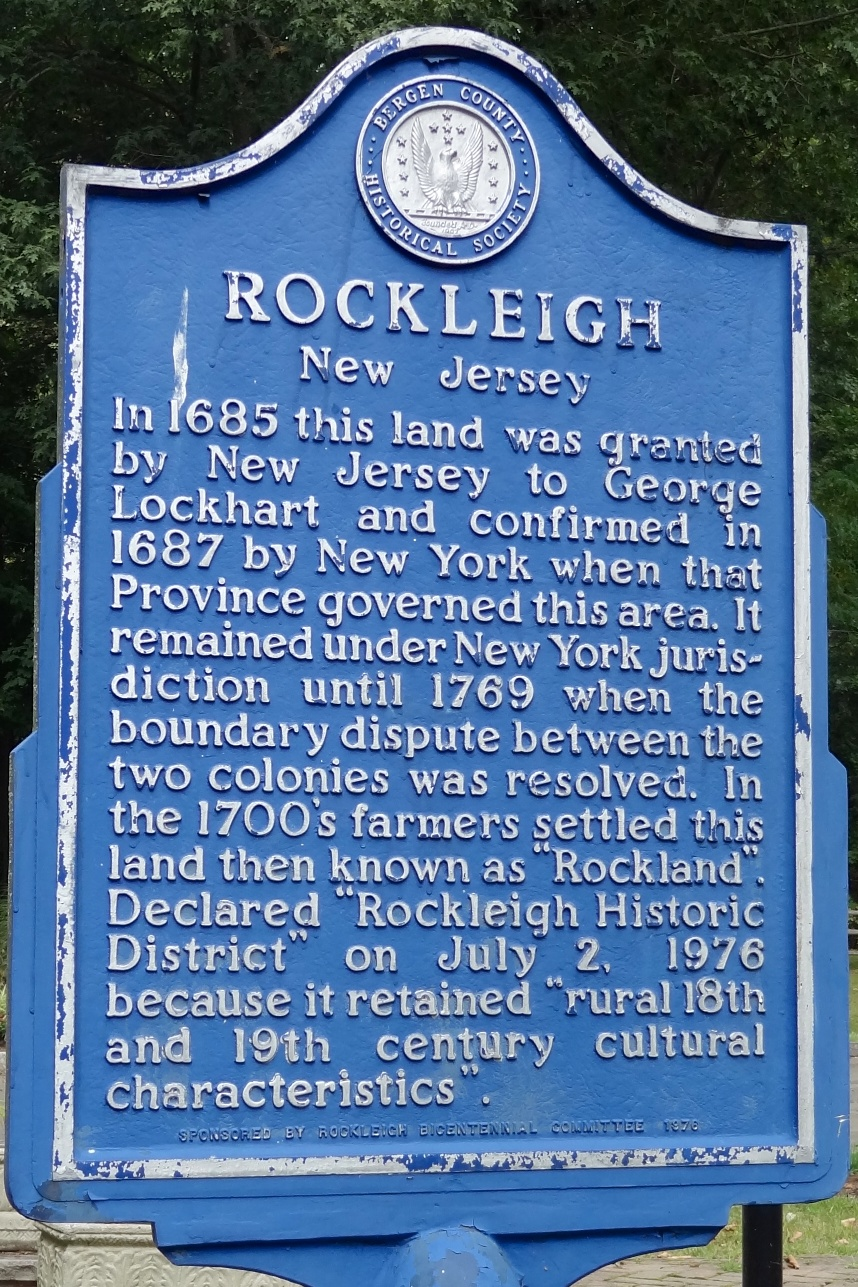
Information sign

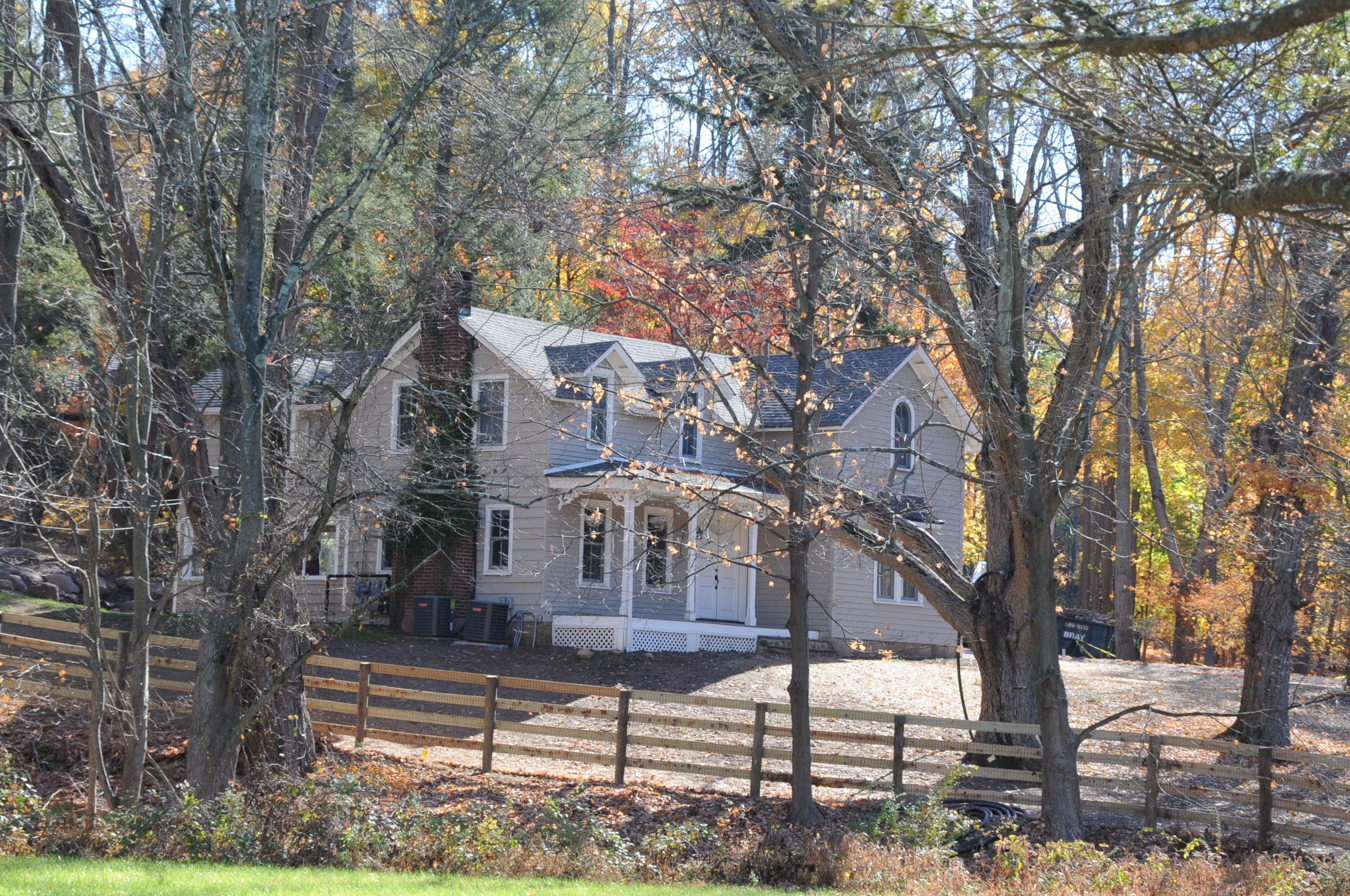
Jacob Haring House

== See also ==
- National Register of Historic Places listings in Bergen County, New Jersey
