= Sophia Eckerson =

American botanist and academic (c. 1880–1954)

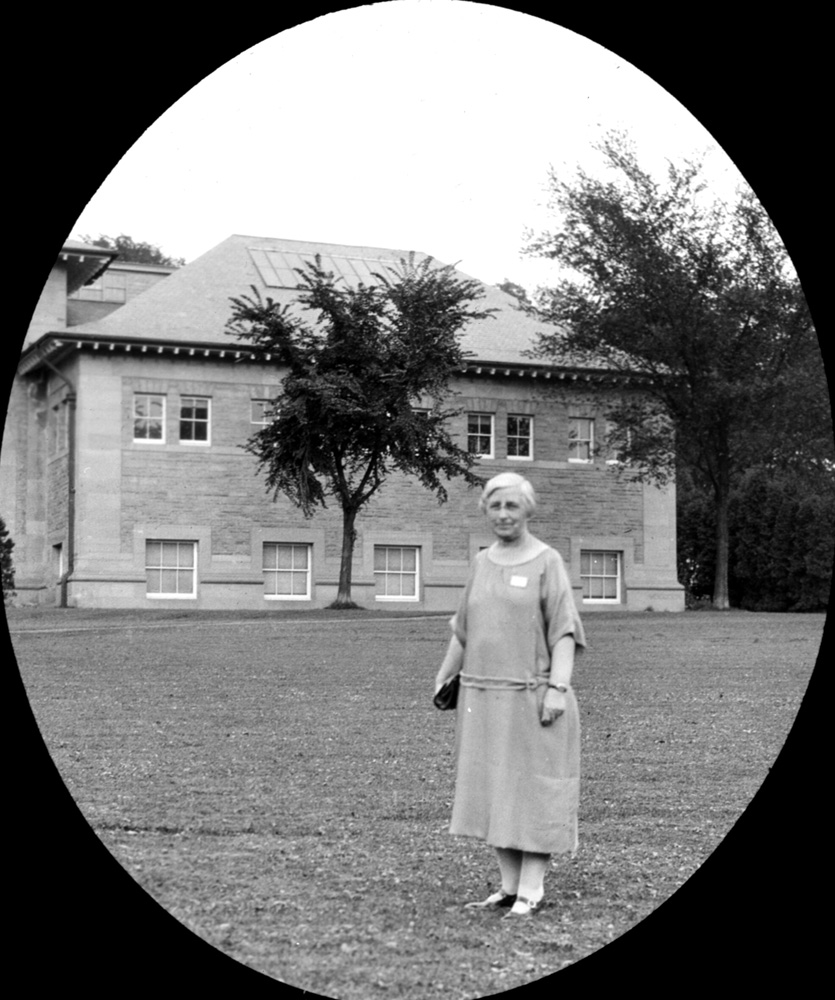
- Dr. Eckerson at the International Congress of Plant Sciences in Ithaca, New York (August 1926)
- Born: c. 1880; Old Tappan, New Jersey, United States
- Died: July 19, 1954 (aged 73–74); Pleasant Valley, Connecticut
- Education: Smith College
- Scientific career
- Fields: Botany; Microchemistry
- Workplaces: Boyce Thompson Institute; University of Wisconsin; Washington State University; University of Chicago
- Thesis: A Physiological and Chemical Study of After-Ripening (1911)

Sophia Hennion Eckerson (c. 1880 – July 19, 1954) was an American botanist and microchemist known for her work tracking chemical changes during plant development.

== Biography ==
Sophia Eckerson was born around 1880 (her exact date of birth is unknown) in Old Tappan, New Jersey, to Albert Bogert Eckerson and Ann Hennion Eckerson. After graduating from secondary school, Eckerson did not immediately go to university and instead helped her brothers in college. By 1901, however, she had enrolled in Smith College in Massachusetts where she was inspired by William Francis Ganong to study and pursue a career in botany and plant physiology. Eckerson completed her bachelor's degree in 1905 and stayed at Smith College for her master's degree which she completed in 1907. During her time at Smith College Eckerson taught botany and plant microchemistry, working as a demonstrator and assistant in the botany department between 1905 and 1909. Traveling to the University of Chicago in 1909, Eckerson was awarded her Ph.D. in 1911.

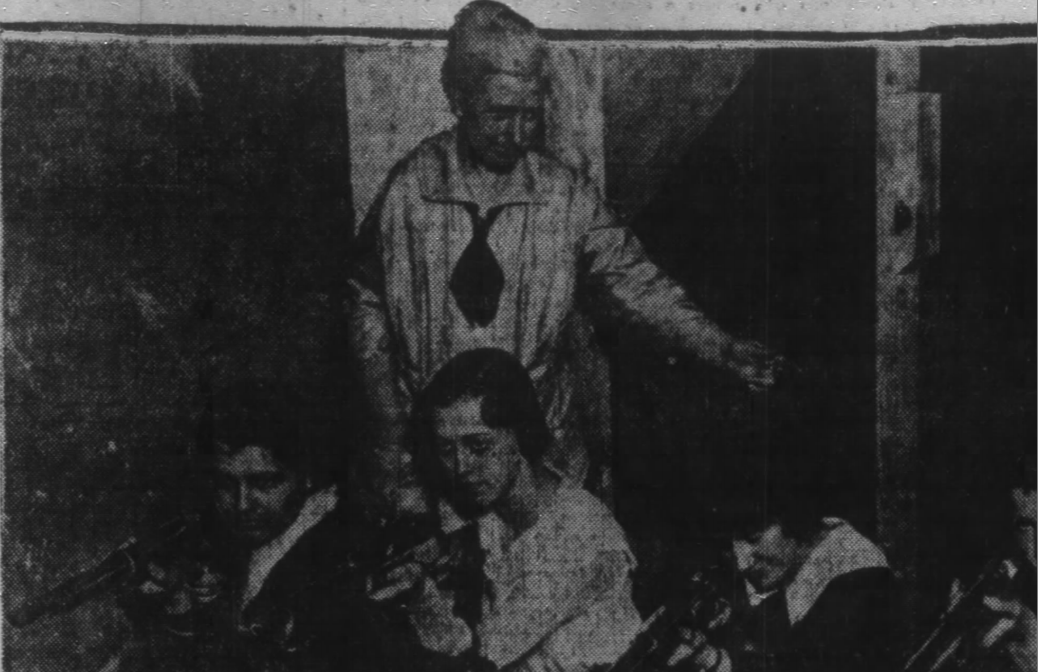
American botanist, Sophia Eckerson, teaching female University of Chicago staff to fire rifles in 1917.

Following her doctorate, Eckerson obtained the post of assistant plant physiologist at the University of Chicago until 1915 when she became an instructor of plant microchemistry. During this time, she was also working as a microchemist with Washington State College. She continued her work as a microchemist with the U.S. Department of Agriculture's Bureau of Plant Industry in 1919 and furthermore in partnership with the University of Wisconsin in 1921 until 1923. Eckerson also taught and did research at the University of Wisconsin, before taking a job as plant microchemist at the Boyce Thompson Institute for Plant Research in Yonkers, New York, in 1924; a position in which she remained for the rest of her career, eventually becoming chair of the institute's Department of Microchemistry. Eckerson also served as vice-chair (1934) and chair (1935) of the physiological section of the Botanical Society of America; a rare position for a woman at that time. She was awarded Graduate Women In Science (GWIS) Honorary Membership Award for Research in 1941 and the GWIS Certificate for Outstanding Service to Science in 1951

Due to often moving around the country with her work, Eckerson never married. She retired from active work in 1940, and died on July 19, 1954, in Pleasant Valley, Connecticut following a week's illness.

== Research ==
Eckerson's work on plant chemistry began with her Ph.D. on the topic of how seed embryos change during germination. This work was conducted using different species of Crataegus, more commonly known as hawthorn. She stained sections of living tissue for a variety of biomolecules and found an increase in enzyme activity and acidity during the after-ripening period.

At Washington State College, her work in development continued, where she worked on the progressive development of wheat plants. She tracked the chemical and morphological changes of wheat through its lifetime, similar to her graduate work, noting the chemical changes that take place during the ripening of grain.

During her short tenure at the University of Wisconsin, she continued working on wheat plants. This time included a unique discovery of intracellular bodies associated with rosette disease in wheat. In this study, the group looked for the causal agent of rosette disease and additional leaf mottling in wheat. Unlike other mosaic diseases, leaf mottling of wheat continued over several years. The soil was found to be heavily infected with the fungus, Helminthosporium sativum, which caused mottling on up to 98% of the wheat in the plot. When the soil was disinfected with formaldehyde or steam, mottling was no longer present, suggesting that the fungus had caused the mottling. As a microchemist, Eckerson conducted microscopic studies of plant tissues affected by the rosette disease and documented intracellular bodies in these tissues, which are not found in healthy wheat plants.

Her early work at the Boyce Thompson Institute was a continuation of the study of mottling leaves of mosaic plants, however, this experiment was in a new model organism, tomato. Later, in 1931, her work shifted back towards microchemical assays. She published a study examining the influence of phosphorus deficiency on metabolism in tomatoes, the distribution of reductase in apple trees, and the conditions that affect nitrate reduction in plants.

Later in her tenure at the Boyce Thompson Institute, she conducted experiments on how plants synthesize proteins found in the soil, and later on the processes by which cotton and other plants produce cellulose particles before later retiring in 1940.
