= Blauvelt House (Harrington Park, New Jersey) =

Historic house in New Jersey, US

- U.S. National Register of Historic Places
- New Jersey Register of Historic Places
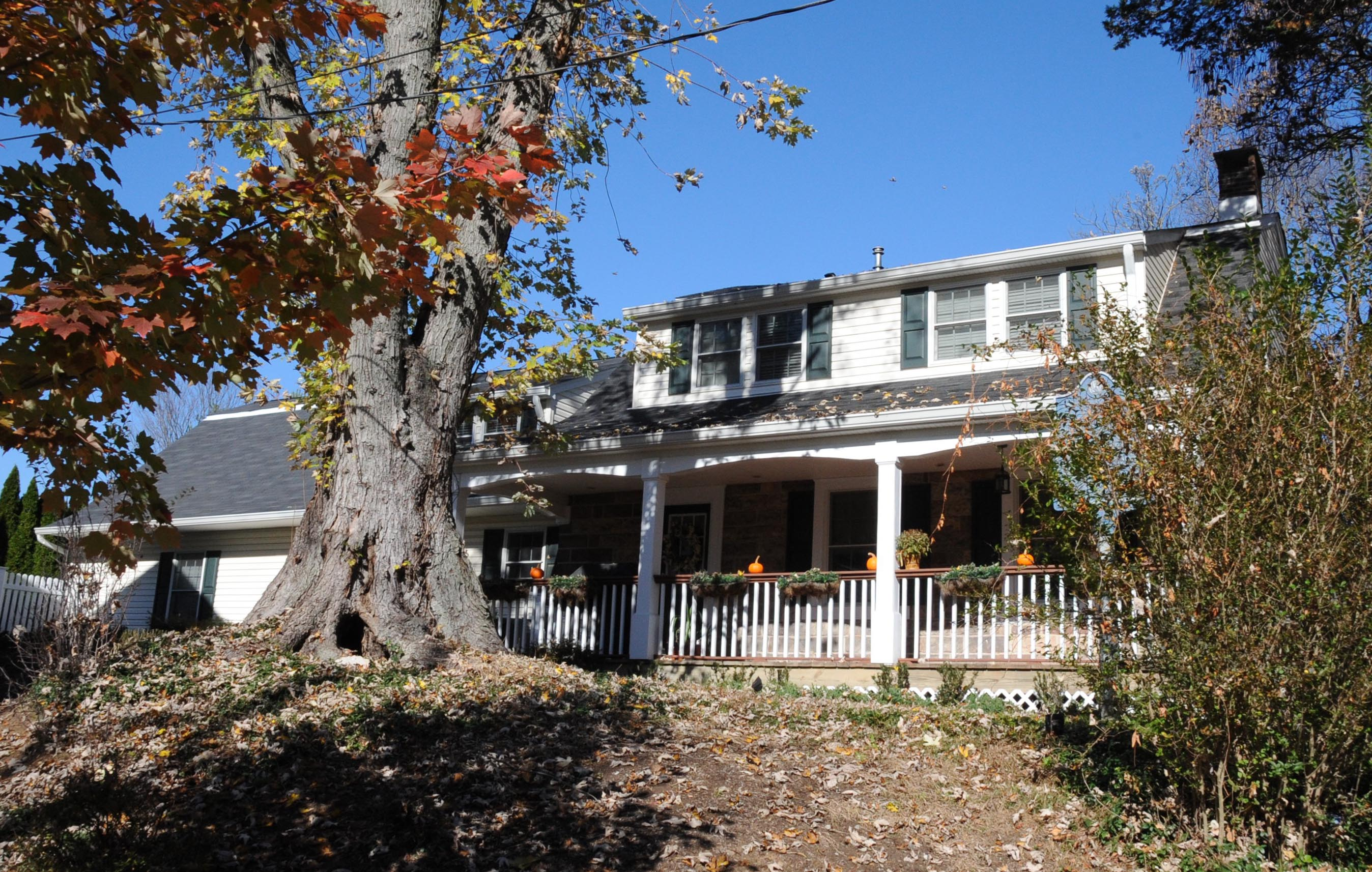
- Blauvelt House in 2015

- Location within Bergen County, New Jersey Location within New Jersey Location within the United States
- Location: 622 Lafayette Road, Harrington Park, New Jersey
- Coordinates: 41°0′0″N 73°58′29″W
- Area: 2.5 acres (1.0 ha)
- MPS: Stone Houses of Bergen County TR
- NRHP reference No.: 83001473
- NJRHP No.: 527

Significant dates
- Added to NRHP: January 9, 1983
- Designated NJRHP: October 3, 1980

The Blauvelt House is located at 622 Lafayette Road in the borough of Harrington Park in Bergen County, New Jersey, United States. The historic stone house was added to the National Register of Historic Places on January 9, 1983, for its significance in architecture and exploration/settlement. It was listed as part of the Early Stone Houses of Bergen County Multiple Property Submission (MPS).

According to the nomination form, the house was built by a member of the Blauvelt family in 1800, supported by architectural evidence. Two other houses listed on the NRHP in Bergen County have similar names: the Blauvelt House at 54 Tappan Road in Norwood, and the Blauvelt–Demarest House at 230 Broadway in Hillsdale.

== See also ==
- National Register of Historic Places listings in Bergen County, New Jersey
