= Old Tappan, New Jersey =

Borough in Bergen County, New Jersey, US

- Borough
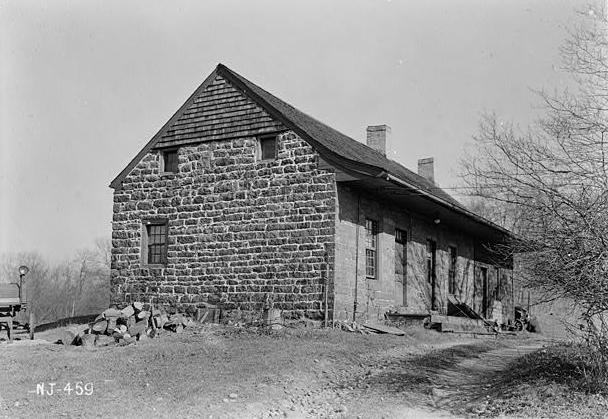
- Gerrit Haring House in 1937

- Seal

- Location of Old Tappan in Bergen County highlighted in red (left). Inset map: Location of Bergen County in New Jersey highlighted in orange (right).

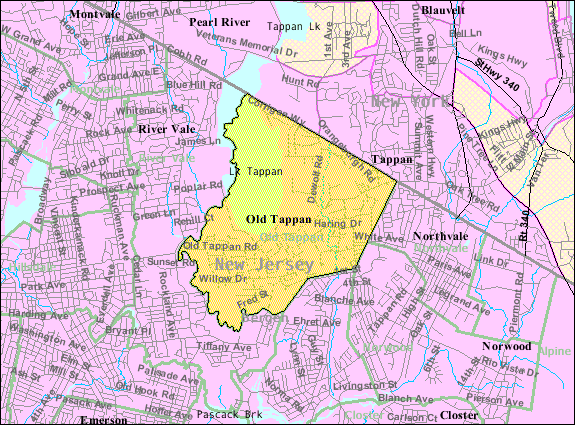
- Census Bureau map of Old Tappan, New Jersey

- Location in Bergen County Location in New Jersey Location in the United States
- Coordinates: 41.023305°N 73.984223°W
- Country: United States
- State: New Jersey
- County: Bergen
- Incorporated: October 18, 1894
- Named for: Tappan tribe

Government
  - Type: Borough
  - Body: Borough Council
  - Mayor: Thomas Gallagher (R, term ends December 31, 2027)
  - Administrator: Anna Haverilla
  - Municipal clerk: Jean M. Donch

Area
  - Total: 4.16 sq mi (10.78 km^{2})
  - Land: 3.32 sq mi (8.59 km^{2})
  - Water: 0.85 sq mi (2.20 km^{2}) 20.37%
  - Rank: 293rd of 565 in state 19th of 70 in county
- Elevation: 52 ft (16 m)

Population (2020)
  - Total: 5,888
  - Estimate (2023): 6,074
  - Rank: 353rd of 565 in state 56th of 70 in county
  - Density: 1,776.2/sq mi (685.8/km^{2})
  - Rank: 310th of 565 in state 60th of 70 in county
- Time zone: UTC−05:00 (Eastern (EST))
  - Summer (DST): UTC−04:00 (Eastern (EDT))
- ZIP Code: 07675
- Area code: 201
- FIPS code: 3400354870
- GNIS feature ID: 0885336
- Website: www.oldtappan.net

Old Tappan (English pronunciation: /tæˈpæːn/) is a borough in northern Bergen County, in the U.S. state of New Jersey. As of the 2020 United States census, the borough's population was 5,888, an increase of 138 (+2.4%) from the 2010 census count of 5,750, which in turn reflected an increase of 268 (+4.9%) from the 5,482 counted in the 2000 census.

Old Tappan was incorporated as a borough by an act of the New Jersey Legislature on October 18, 1894, from portions of Harrington Township, based on the results of a referendum held two days earlier. The borough was formed during the "Boroughitis" phenomenon then sweeping through Bergen County, in which 26 boroughs were formed in the county in 1894 alone. On April 23, 1896, additional territory was annexed from Harrington Township. The borough's name is derived from the Tappan tribe of Native Americans.

== Geography ==
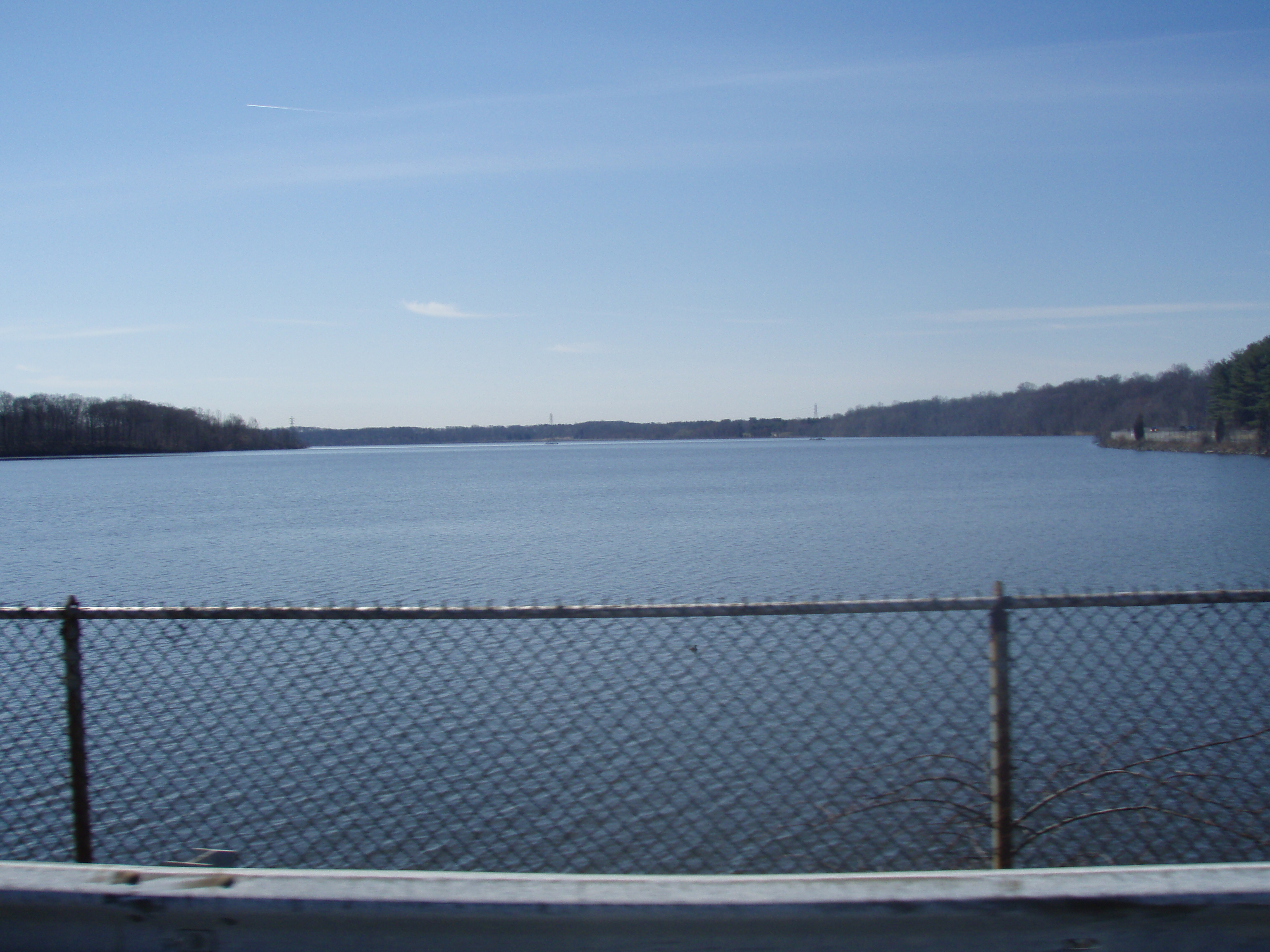
The Lake Tappan reservoir straddles the Bergen County municipalities of Old Tappan and River Vale, as well as a smaller portion within adjacent Rockland County, New York.

According to the United States Census Bureau, the borough had a total area of 4.163 square miles (10.78 km^{2}), including 3.315 square miles (8.59 km^{2}) of land and 0.848 square miles (2.20 km^{2}) of water (20.38%).

One of only four confluence points in New Jersey, the 41°N 74°W crossing, is in Old Tappan on watershed property owned by United Water.

The borough is bordered to the north by the hamlets of Pearl River and Tappan in the town of Orangetown in Rockland County, New York. Lake Tappan and the Hackensack River are on the western side of the town, bordering River Vale. Harrington Park is to the south and Northvale and Norwood are to the east.

As of 2026, the borough is a member of Local Leaders for Responsible Planning in order to address the borough's Mount Laurel doctrine-based housing obligations.

== Demographics ==
Historical population
Census	Pop.	Note	%±
1900	269		—
1910	305		13.4%
1920	404		32.5%
1930	600		48.5%
1940	609		1.5%
1950	828		36.0%
1960	2,330		181.4%
1970	3,917		68.1%
1980	4,168		6.4%
1990	4,254		2.1%
2000	5,482		28.9%
2010	5,750		4.9%
2020	5,888		2.4%
2023 (est.)	6,074	▲	3.2%
Population sources: 1900–1920 1900–1910; 1910–1930 1900–2020; 2000 2010 2020

=== Racial and ethnic composition ===
Old Tappan borough, New Jersey – Racial and ethnic composition Note: the US Census treats Hispanic/Latino as an ethnic category. This table excludes Latinos from the racial categories and assigns them to a separate category. Hispanics/Latinos may be of any race.
Race / Ethnicity (NH = Non-Hispanic)	Pop 2000	Pop 2010	Pop 2020	% 2000	% 2010	% 2020
White alone (NH)	4,412	4,072	3,673	80.48%	70.82%	62.38%
Black or African American alone (NH)	30	40	59	0.55%	0.70%	1.00%
Native American or Alaska Native alone (NH)	3	4	3	0.05%	0.07%	0.05%
Asian alone (NH)	857	1,276	1,600	15.63%	22.19%	27.17%
Native Hawaiian or Pacific Islander alone (NH)	0	0	0	0.00%	0.00%	0.00%
Other race alone (NH)	2	2	15	0.04%	0.03%	0.25%
Mixed race or Multiracial (NH)	27	68	158	0.49%	1.18%	2.68%
Hispanic or Latino (any race)	151	288	380	2.75%	5.01%	6.45%
Total	5,482	5,750	5,888	100.00%	100.00%	100.00%

=== 2020 census ===
As of the 2020 census, the borough had a population of 5,888. The median age was 46.6 years. Of residents, 22.7% were under age 18 and 19.9% were age 65 or older. For every 100 females, there were 96.9 males, and for every 100 females age 18 and over, there were 92.3 males.

All residents were counted in urban areas (100.0%), with 0.0% in rural areas.

There were 1,982 households, of which 37.1% had children under age 18 living in them. Of all households, 71.7% were married-couple households, 8.2% were households with a male householder and no spouse or partner present, and 17.6% were households with a female householder and no spouse or partner present. About 15.0% of households were made up of individuals, and 11.1% had someone living alone who was age 65 or older.

There were 2,083 housing units, of which 4.8% were vacant. The homeowner vacancy rate was 1.0%, and the rental vacancy rate was 11.3%.

=== 2010 census ===
The 2010 United States census counted 5,750 people, 1,931 households, and 1,593 families in the borough. The population density was 1,725.8 per square mile (666.3/km^{2}). There were 1,995 housing units at an average density of 598.8 per square mile (231.2/km^{2}). The racial makeup was 74.78% (4,300) White, 0.73% (42) Black or African American, 0.09% (5) Native American, 22.24% (1,279) Asian, 0.00% (0) Pacific Islander, 0.63% (36) from other races, and 1.53% (88) from two or more races. Hispanic or Latino of any race were 5.01% (288) of the population. Korean Americans accounted for 17.1% of the population.

Of the 1,931 households, 40.0% had children under the age of 18; 73.1% were married couples living together; 7.5% had a female householder with no husband present and 17.5% were non-families. Of all households, 16.1% were made up of individuals and 10.8% had someone living alone who was 65 years of age or older. The average household size was 2.98 and the average family size was 3.35.

27.4% of the population were under the age of 18, 6.0% from 18 to 24, 18.0% from 25 to 44, 32.5% from 45 to 64, and 16.1% who were 65 years of age or older. The median age was 44.2 years. For every 100 females, the population had 93.1 males. For every 100 females ages 18 and older there were 88.2 males.

The Census Bureau's 2006–2010 American Community Survey showed that (in 2010 inflation-adjusted dollars) median household income was $125,435 (with a margin of error of +/− $30,643) and the median family income was $158,140 (+/− $27,026). Males had a median income of $90,536 (+/− $18,555) versus $61,875 (+/− $9,686) for females. The per capita income for the borough was $58,673 (+/− $7,319). About 2.4% of families and 2.4% of the population were below the poverty line, including 0.8% of those under age 18 and none of those age 65 or over.

Same-sex couples headed 8 households in 2010, an increase from the 6 counted in 2000.

=== 2000 census ===
As of the 2000 United States census there were 5,482 people, 1,778 households, and 1,541 families residing in the borough. There were 1,804 housing units at an average density of 558.6 per square mile (215.7/km^{2}). The racial makeup of the borough was 82.69% Caucasian, 15.63% Asian, 0.60% African American, 0.05% Native American, 0.44% from other races, and 0.58% from two or more races. Hispanics or Latinos of any race were 2.75% of the population.

In 2000, there were 1,778 households, out of which 42.6% had children under the age of 18 living with them, 77.7% were married couples living together, 6.7% had a female householder with no husband present, and 13.3% were non-families. 12.1% of all households were made up of individuals, and 6.1% had someone living alone who was 65 years of age or older. The average household size was 3.02 and the average family size was 3.28.

In the borough the population was spread out, with 27.0% under the age of 18, 5.9% from 18 to 24, 24.3% from 25 to 44, 28.3% from 45 to 64, and 14.6% who were 65 years of age or older. The median age was 41 years. For every 100 females, there were 92.4 males. For every 100 females age 18 and over, there were 89.0 males.

The median income for a household in the borough was $102,127, and the median income for a family was $106,772. Males had a median income of $77,635 versus $48,047 for females. The per capita income for the borough was $48,367. About 1.0% of families and 1.8% of the population were below the poverty line, including 0.9% of those under age 18 and 3.1% of those age 65 or over.

== Parks and recreation ==
Old Tappan Golf Course is a nine-hole golf course located on DeWolf Road. The golf course is a private club that is open to the public. Stone Point Park is located on Westwood Avenue and is the site of many community events such as Town Day. Stone Point has four baseball fields, two basketball courts, a playground, a seasonal skate park, and four soccer fields. Oaks Park is a small park on Central Avenue with a small walking trail. It is the site of the borough's annual Halloween Parade. There is also a little league field called Gallagher Field, which was renamed in 2006 for Edward J. Gallagher, who had served as the borough's mayor for 16 years; The field is located on Charles Place near the elementary and middle school. There is also a track and football field as well as a dozen tennis courts at the high school that are open to the general public.

== Government ==
=== Local government ===
Old Tappan is governed under the borough form of New Jersey municipal government, which is used in 218 municipalities (of the 564) statewide, making it the most common form of government in New Jersey. The governing body is comprised of a mayor and a borough council, with all positions elected at-large on a partisan basis as part of the November general election. A mayor is elected directly by the voters to a four-year term of office. The borough council is comprised of six members elected to serve three-year terms on a staggered basis, with two seats coming up for election each year in a three-year cycle. The borough form of government used by Old Tappan is a "weak mayor / strong council" government in which council members act as the legislative body with the mayor presiding at meetings and voting only in the event of a tie. The mayor can veto ordinances subject to an override by a two-thirds majority vote of the council. The mayor makes committee and liaison assignments for council members, and most appointments are made by the mayor with the advice and consent of the council. This seven-member governing body enacts local ordinances, levies municipal taxes, conducts the affairs of the borough and in almost all cases, can review and approve the actions of other borough boards, committees and agencies. The mayor and borough council conduct all of its business during monthly meetings open to the public. All legislative powers of the borough are exercised by the mayor and council in the form of a resolution, ordinance or proclamation.

As of 2024, the mayor of Old Tappan is Republican Thomas E. Gallagher, whose term of office ends December 31, 2027. Members of the Old Tappan Borough Council are Council President Jin Yhu (R, 2024), Ron E. Binaghi Jr. (R, 2026), William R. Boyce IV (R, 2025), Guy J. Carnazza (R, 2024), Cort Gwon (R, 2025) and Christine P. Massaro (R, 2026).

In June 2019, the borough council selected Jin Yhu from three candidates nominated by the Republican municipal committee to fill the seat expiring in December 2021 that had become vacant following the resignation of Anna Haverilla, who took office as the Borough Administrator; Yhu, the borough's first Korean-American councilmember, served on an interim basis until the November 2019 general election, when voters elected him to serve the balance of the term of office.

In February 2016, the borough council selected Thomas Gallagher from three candidates nominated by the Republican municipal committee to fill the council seat expiring in December 2017 that was vacated by John Kramer when he took office as mayor. Gallagher will serve until the November 2016 general election, when voters will select a replacement to fill the balance of the term of office.

=== Federal, state and county representation ===
Old Tappan is located in the 5th Congressional District and is part of New Jersey's 39th state legislative district.

For the 119th United States Congress, New Jersey's 5th congressional district is represented by Josh Gottheimer (D, Wyckoff). New Jersey is represented in the United States Senate by Democrats Cory Booker (Newark, term ends 2027) and Andy Kim (Moorestown, term ends 2031).

For the 2026–2027 session, the 39th legislative district of the New Jersey Legislature is represented in the State Senate by Holly Schepisi (R, River Vale) and in the General Assembly by Robert Auth (R, Old Tappan) and John V. Azzariti (R, Saddle River).

Bergen County is governed by a directly elected County Executive, with legislative functions performed by a Board of County Commissioners comprised of seven members who are elected at-large to three-year terms in partisan elections on a staggered basis, with either two or three seats coming up for election each November; a Chairman and Vice Chairman are selected from among its seven members at a reorganization meeting held every January. As of 2025, the county executive is James J. Tedesco III (D, Paramus), whose four-year term of office ends December 31, 2026.

Bergen County's Commissioners are Chair Mary J. Amoroso (D, Mahwah, 2025), Vice Chair Steven A. Tanelli (D, North Arlington, 2027), Chair Pro Tem Joan Voss (D, Fort Lee, 2026), Rafael Marte (D, Bergenfield, 2026), Germaine M. Ortiz (D, Emerson, 2025), Thomas J. Sullivan Jr. (D, Montvale, 2025) and Tracy Silna Zur (D, Franklin Lakes, 2027).

Bergen County's elected constitutional officials are Clerk John S. Hogan (D, Northvale, 2026), Sheriff Anthony Cureton (D, Englewood, 2027) and Surrogate Michael R. Dressler (D, Cresskill, 2026).

=== Politics ===
United States presidential election results for Old Tappan 2024 2020 2016 2012 2008 2004
Year	Republican		Democratic		Third party(ies)	
Year	No.	%	No.	%	No.	%
2024	1,918	55.10%	1,501	43.12%	62	1.78%
2020	1,888	51.30%	1,764	47.93%	28	0.76%
2016	1,663	53.59%	1,365	43.99%	75	2.42%
2012	1,792	62.07%	1,072	37.13%	23	0.80%
2008	1,736	56.69%	1,309	42.75%	17	0.56%
2004	1,690	56.35%	1,289	42.98%	20	0.67%

As of March 2011, there were a total of 3,821 registered voters in Old Tappan, of which 749 (19.6% vs. 31.7% countywide) were registered as Democrats, 1,015 (26.6% vs. 21.1%) were registered as Republicans and 2,057 (53.8% vs. 47.1%) were registered as Unaffiliated. There were no voters registered to other parties. Among the borough's 2010 Census population, 66.5% (vs. 57.1% in Bergen County) were registered to vote, including 91.5% of those ages 18 and over (vs. 73.7% countywide).

In the 2016 presidential election, Republican Donald Trump received 1,663 votes (53.3% vs. 41.6% countywide), ahead of Democrat Hillary Clinton with 1,365 votes (43.7% vs. 54.8%) and other candidates with 94 votes (3.0% vs. 3.0%), among the 3,150 ballots cast by the borough's 4,318 registered voters (28 ballots were spoiled), for a turnout of 72.9% (vs. 73.0% in Bergen County). In the 2012 presidential election, Republican Mitt Romney received 1,792 votes (61.8% vs. 43.5% countywide), ahead of Democrat Barack Obama with 1,072 votes (37.0% vs. 54.8%) and other candidates with 23 votes (0.8% vs. 0.9%), among the 2,898 ballots cast by the borough's 4,040 registered voters, for a turnout of 71.7% (vs. 70.4% in Bergen County). In the 2008 presidential election, Republican John McCain received 1,736 votes (56.3% vs. 44.5% countywide), ahead of Democrat Barack Obama with 1,309 votes (42.4% vs. 53.9%) and other candidates with 17 votes (0.6% vs. 0.8%), among the 3,084 ballots cast by the borough's 3,986 registered voters, for a turnout of 77.4% (vs. 76.8% in Bergen County). In the 2004 presidential election, Republican George W. Bush received 1,690 votes (56.2% vs. 47.2% countywide), ahead of Democrat John Kerry with 1,289 votes (42.9% vs. 51.7%) and other candidates with 20 votes (0.7% vs. 0.7%), among the 3,006 ballots cast by the borough's 3,848 registered voters, for a turnout of 78.1% (vs. 76.9% in the whole county).

Gubernatorial election results for Old Tappan
Year	Republican		Democratic		Third party(ies)	
Year	No.	%	No.	%	No.	%
2025	1,485	57.65%	1,085	42.12%	6	0.23%
2021	1,285	59.27%	873	40.27%	10	0.46%
2017	770	55.56%	605	43.65%	11	0.79%
2013	1,174	74.78%	386	24.59%	10	0.64%
2009	1,201	61.59%	671	34.41%	78	4.00%
2005	957	54.50%	774	44.08%	25	1.42%

In the 2013 gubernatorial election, Republican Chris Christie received 74.8% of the vote (1,174 cast), ahead of Democrat Barbara Buono with 24.6% (386 votes), and other candidates with 0.6% (10 votes), among the 1,590 ballots cast by the borough's 3,933 registered voters (20 ballots were spoiled), for a turnout of 40.4%. In the 2009 gubernatorial election, Republican Chris Christie received 1,201 votes (61.0% vs. 45.8% countywide), ahead of Democrat Jon Corzine with 671 votes (34.1% vs. 48.0%), Independent Chris Daggett with 72 votes (3.7% vs. 4.7%) and other candidates with 6 votes (0.3% vs. 0.5%), among the 1,969 ballots cast by the borough's 3,921 registered voters, yielding a 50.2% turnout (vs. 50.0% in the county).

United States Senate election results for Old Tappan1
Year	Republican		Democratic		Third party(ies)	
Year	No.	%	No.	%	No.	%
2024	1,800	54.35%	1,466	44.26%	46	1.39%
2018	1,236	59.00%	827	39.47%	32	1.53%
2012	1,594	60.56%	1,014	38.53%	24	0.91%
2006	1,159	57.46%	831	41.20%	27	1.34%

United States Senate election results for Old Tappan2
Year	Republican		Democratic		Third party(ies)	
Year	No.	%	No.	%	No.	%
2020	1,810	50.29%	1,761	48.93%	28	0.78%
2014	785	51.68%	719	47.33%	15	0.99%
2013	586	49.49%	588	49.66%	10	0.84%
2008	1,582	56.72%	1,176	42.17%	31	1.11%

== Emergency services ==
=== Police ===
The Old Tappan Police Department is a full-time professional department that provides police services to the Borough of Old Tappan. As of 2016, there are a total of 13 members of the department: one Chief, one Lieutenant, two Sergeants, and nine Officers.

The force is responsible for all aspects of policing in the borough, including responding to fire and medical emergency calls. Each patrol car is equipped with a first aid kit, oxygen tank, and an automated external defibrillator.

Dispatching is provided by the 9-1-1 call center at the River Vale Police Department as part of an interlocal arrangement that dates back to the early 1970s or earlier.

Officers of the Old Tappan Police Department are members of Pascack Valley Local 206 of the New Jersey State Policemen's Benevolent Association.

=== Fire ===
The Old Tappan Volunteer Fire Department (OTVFD) is an all-volunteer fire department. Established in 1932, the department consists of one Chief, one deputy chief, one Captain, and four Lieutenants. In addition, there is a Fire Marshal who heads the Old Tappan Bureau of Fire Prevention. The department is staffed by approximately 55 fully trained firefighters, and is a municipal-run public volunteer fire department that is funded by taxes.

The OTVFD has one station, located at 231 Old Tappan Road. The station houses one pumpers, Engine 64 (first due), one Squad, one tower ladder, Ladder 63, and one rescue unit, Rescue 61.

=== Ambulance ===
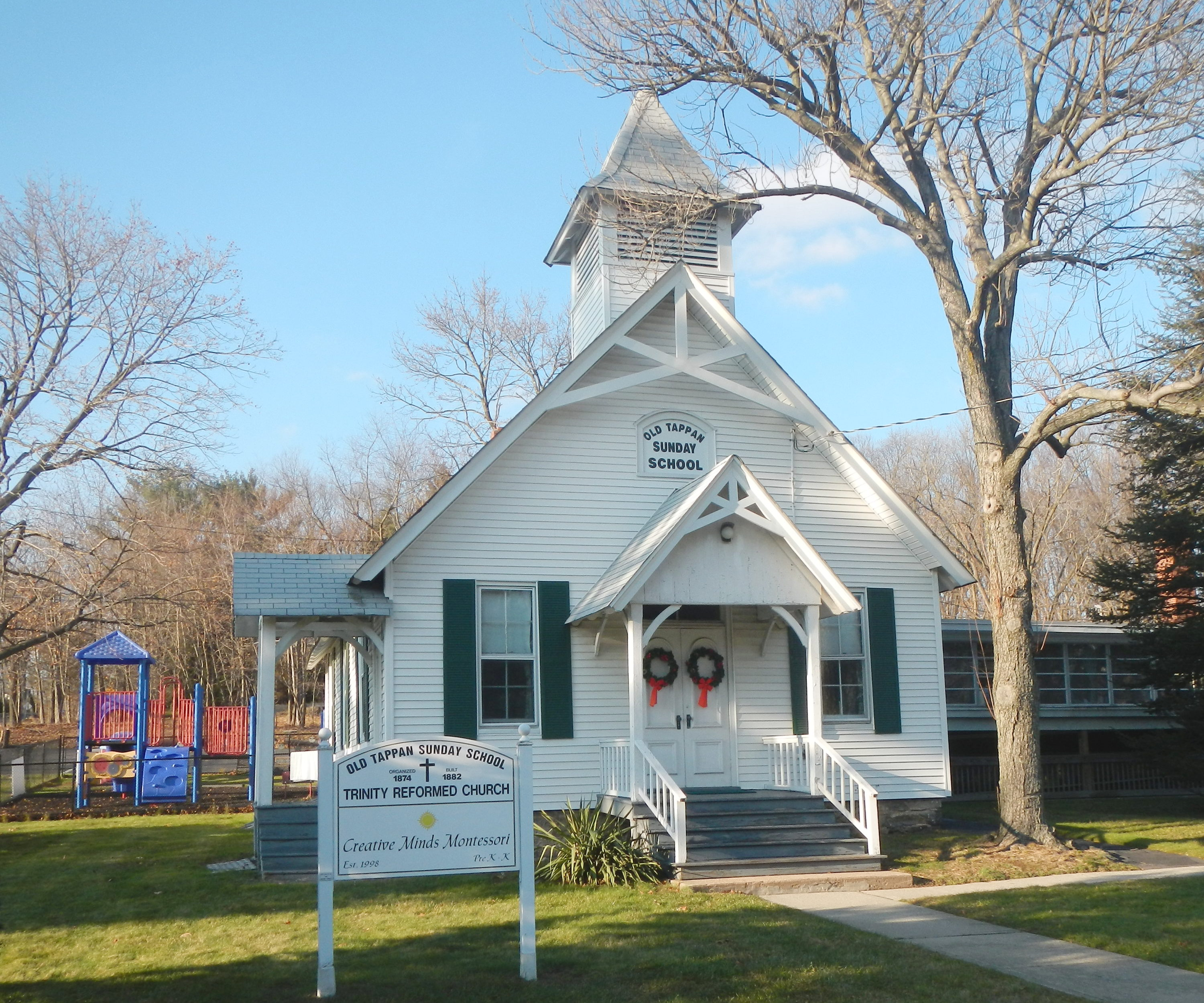
Old Tappan Sunday School, Old Tappan Road

The Old Tappan First Aid Corps (OTFAC) was started in 1939, and is located at 4 Russell Avenue. The corps is run by administrative officers, line officers, and Trustees. The administrative officers are the president, vice president, treasurer, Assistant Treasurer, Recording Secretary, Corresponding Secretary, and Financial Secretary. The line officers are the Captain, 1st Lieutenant, and 2nd Lieutenant. The OTFAC is an all-volunteer independent public emergency medical service. As such, they do not bill for services, and their equipment is not directly paid for by the borough. Funding is provided by donations and support from the borough.

The corps provides basic life support, and is staffed primarily by certified Emergency Medical Technicians. CPR-trained drivers are also sometimes on duty. They have two Type III ambulances, Ambulance 66 and Ambulance 68. Dispatching is provided by the 9-1-1 call center at the River Vale Police Department.

The primary jurisdiction of the OTFAC is the Borough of Old Tappan, but the corps also regularly responds to requests for mutual aid from the neighboring First Aid Squads of River Vale, Emerson, Washington Township, Westwood, Hillsdale, and Tri-Boro (Park Ridge, Woodcliff Lake, and Montvale).

The OTFAC is a member of the New Jersey State First Aid Council, the Pascack Valley Volunteer Ambulance Association and the Pascack Valley Mutual Aid Group.

== Education ==
The Old Tappan Public Schools serve students in pre-kindergarten through eighth grade. As of the 2023–24 school year, the district, comprised of two schools, had an enrollment of 771 students and 65.9 classroom teachers (on an FTE basis), for a student–teacher ratio of 11.7:1. Schools in the district (with 2023–24 enrollment data from the National Center for Education Statistics) are T. Baldwin Demarest Elementary School with 399 students in grades PreK–4 and Charles DeWolf Middle School with 359 students in grades 5–8.

Students in public school for ninth through twelfth grades attend Northern Valley Regional High School at Old Tappan, together with students from Harrington Park, Northvale and Norwood, along with students from Rockleigh who attend the high school as part of a sending/receiving relationship. As of the 2023–24 school year, the high school had an enrollment of 1,068 students and 102.3 classroom teachers (on an FTE basis), for a student–teacher ratio of 10.4:1. The school is one of the two schools of the Northern Valley Regional High School District, which also serves students from the neighboring communities of Closter, Demarest and Haworth at the Northern Valley Regional High School at Demarest.

Public school students from the borough, and all of Bergen County, are eligible to attend the secondary education programs offered by the Bergen County Technical Schools, which include the Bergen County Academies in Hackensack, and the Bergen Tech campus in Teterboro or Paramus. The district offers programs on a shared-time or full-time basis, with admission based on a selective application process and tuition covered by the student's home school district.

== Transportation ==
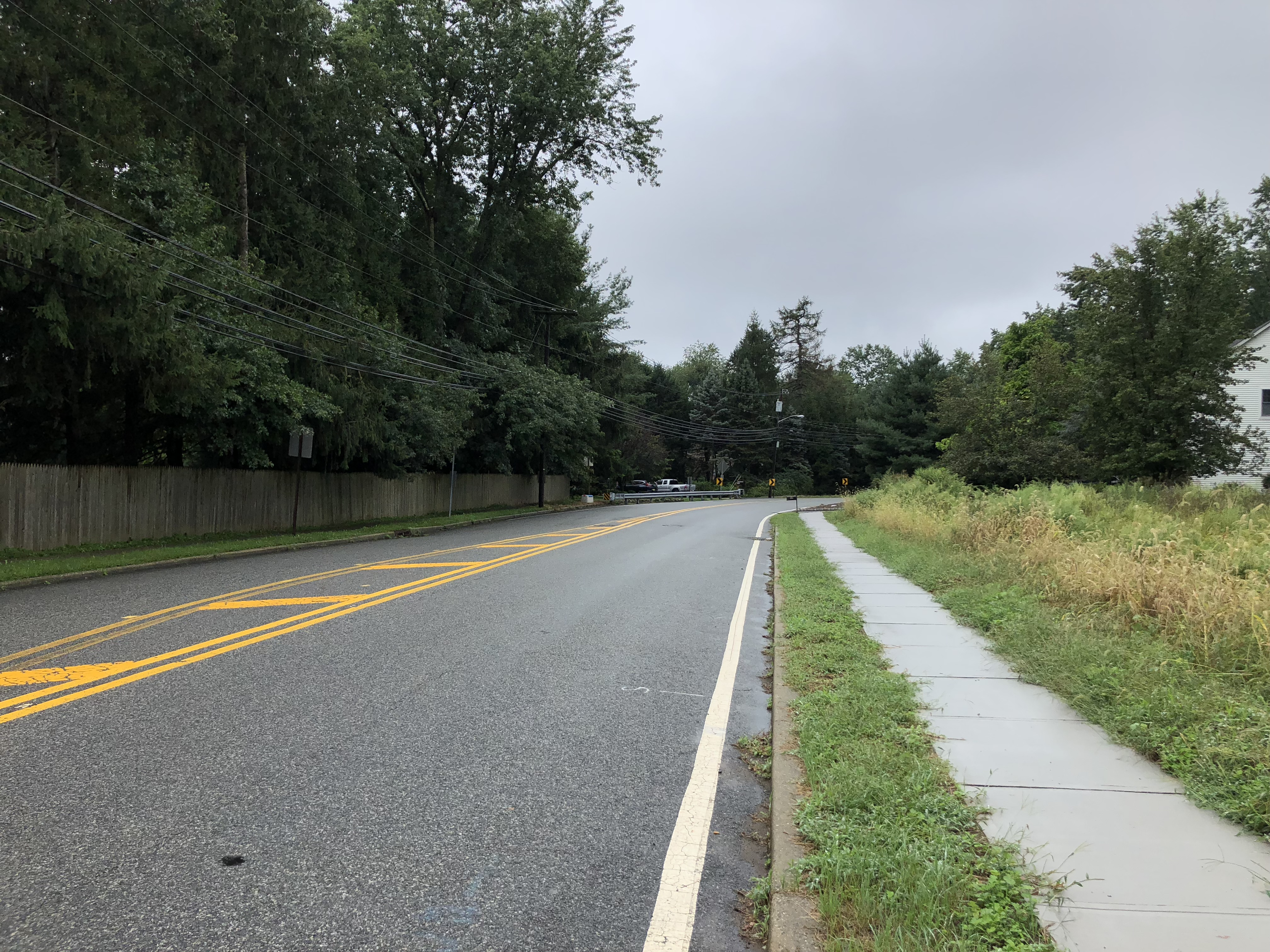
County Route 116 (Old Tappan Road) in Old Tappan

=== Roads and highways ===
As of May 2010, the borough had a total of 32.72 miles (52.66 km) of roadways, of which 27.54 miles (44.32 km) were maintained by the municipality and 5.18 miles (8.34 km) by Bergen County.

Main roads include Old Tappan Road, Washington Avenue, Westwood Avenue, and Orangeburg Road.

== Notable people ==
People who were born in, residents of, or otherwise closely associated with Old Tappan include:

- Brooke Alexx (born 1994/95), singer-songwriter
- Robert Auth (born 1956), politician who represents the 39th Legislative District in the New Jersey General Assembly
- Joe Benigno (born 1953), sports radio personality on WFAN
- David Berkowitz (born 1949), professional bridge player
- Lisa Berkowitz (born 1952), professional bridge player
- P. J. Byrne (born 1974), film and television actor of Horrible Bosses, Final Destination 5 and The Legend of Korra
- Al Di Meola (born 1954), jazz fusion guitarist
- Sophia Eckerson (c. 1880–1954), botanist and microchemist
- Joe Ferriero (born 1957), former chairman of the Bergen County Democratic Organization
- Vincent "The Chin" Gigante (1928–2005), a New York mobster who headed the Genovese crime family
- Jon Hensley (born 1965) and Kelley Menighan Hensley (born 1967), husband and wife actors who had appeared together on the daytime soap opera As the World Turns
- Jack Langer (born 1948/49), basketball player and investment banker
- Robert A. Lewis (1918–1983), co-pilot of the Enola Gay
- Jeffrey Maier (born 1984), best known as the young fan who deflected a ball in play during Game 1 of the 1996 American League Championship Series between the New York Yankees and the Baltimore Orioles
- Kenyon Martin (born 1977), professional basketball player for the Denver Nuggets
- Mike Milo (born 1965), Emmy Award-winning animator, director, storyboard artist, writer and producer in the television industry
- Rob Segedin (born 1988), professional baseball player for the Los Angeles Dodgers

== Historic sites ==
Old Tappan is home to the following locations on the National Register of Historic Places:

- Frederick Haring House – Old Tappan and De Wolf Roads (added 1983)
- Gerrit Haring House – 224 Old Tappan Road (added 1983)
- Teunis Haring House – 70 Old Tappan Road (added 1979)
- Haring-DeWolf House – 95 De Wolf Road (added 1983)

== See also ==
- List of U.S. cities with significant Korean-American populations

== Sources ==
- Municipal Incorporations of the State of New Jersey (according to Counties) prepared by the Division of Local Government, Department of the Treasury (New Jersey); December 1, 1958.
- Clayton, W. Woodford; and Nelson, William. History of Bergen and Passaic Counties, New Jersey, with Biographical Sketches of Many of its Pioneers and Prominent Men., Philadelphia: Everts and Peck, 1882.
- Harvey, Cornelius Burnham (ed.), Genealogical History of Hudson and Bergen Counties, New Jersey. New York: New Jersey Genealogical Publishing Co., 1900.
- Van Valen, James M. History of Bergen County, New Jersey. New York: New Jersey Publishing and Engraving Co., 1900.
- Westervelt, Frances A. (Frances Augusta), 1858–1942, History of Bergen County, New Jersey, 1630–1923, Lewis Historical Publishing Company, 1923.
