= Brooke Alexx =

Singer-songwriter from New Jersey, US

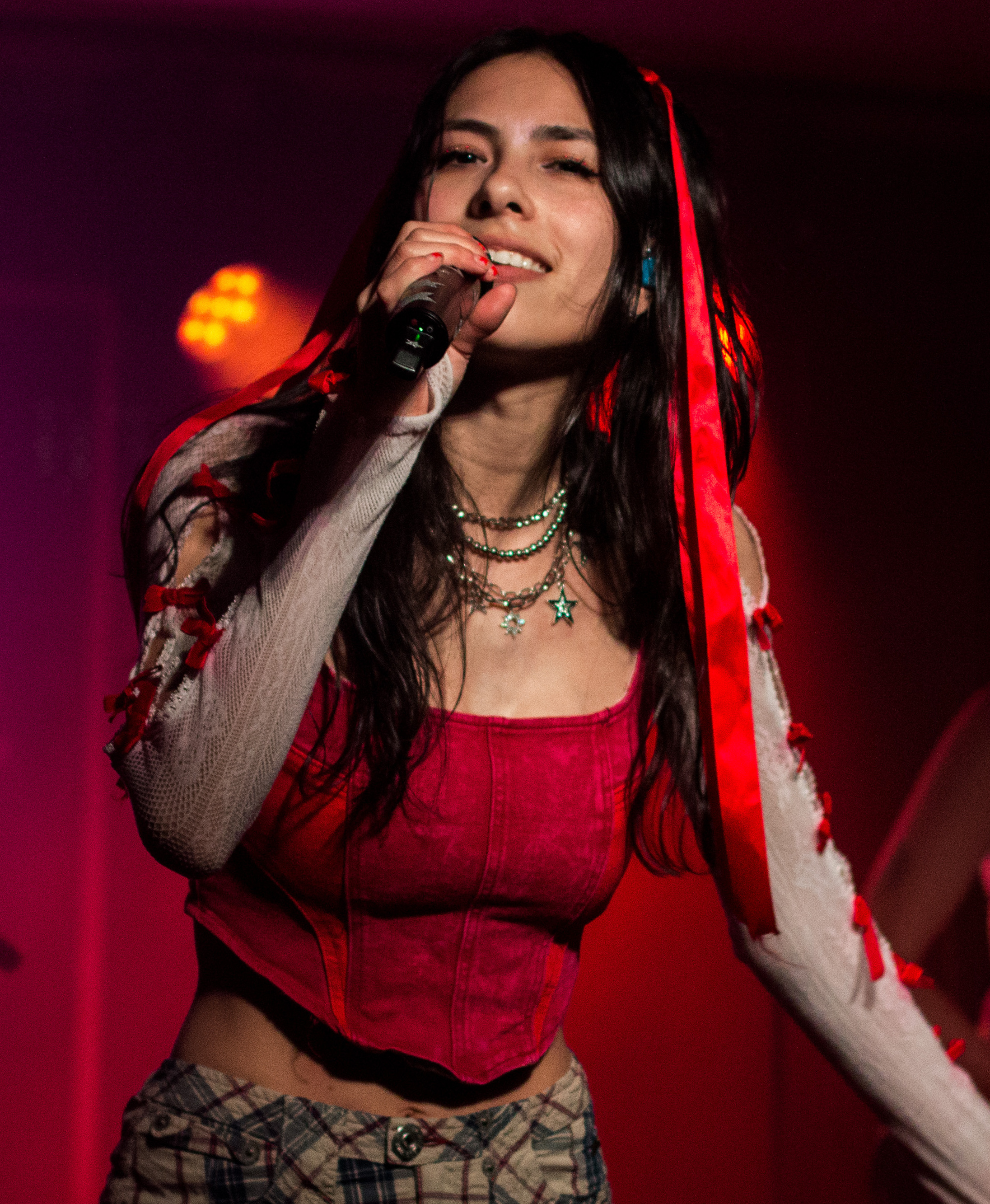
- Alexx in 2025

Background information
- Born: Brooke Greenberg; 1994 or 1995 (age 30–31); Old Tappan, New Jersey, U.S.
- Genre: Pop
- Occupation: Singer-songwriter
- Years active: 2019–present
- Label: Independent
- Website: www.brookealexx.com

Brooke Alexx (born Brooke Greenberg) is an American singer-songwriter. A New Jersey native of Japanese and Jewish descent, she gained prominence through social media and her participation in NBC's American Song Contest in 2022. Her breakthrough single "All My Exes' Moms" (2022) won first place in the Pop category of the 2023 American Songwriter Song Contest and amassed over 27 million streams on Spotify. Alexx released her debut album, Big Mouth, in October 2024. She is currently based in Los Angeles.

== Early life ==
Alexx was raised in Old Tappan, New Jersey, to a Japanese-American mother and Jewish-American father. She grew up in a musical family with two younger sisters, performing in talent shows and school musicals at Northern Valley Regional High School at Old Tappan, including a role in The Wedding Singer.

At age 13, Alexx was inspired by Taylor Swift's "Love Story" (2008) to begin writing pop songs and learning guitar, crediting Swift with changing her life's trajectory. She studied music production and recording arts at Elon University in North Carolina. After graduating, she moved to Nashville, Tennessee, around 2017 with the musician Rosemary Joaquin.

== Career ==
=== Early career ===
In Nashville, Alexx worked as a video editor for Big Machine Records and Warner Music Nashville while building her music career independently. In 2019, Alexx released her debut EP Me, a five-track project featuring the single "Bored". She grew a following on TikTok by sharing music videos and content, including dating stories, reaching over 255,000 followers by 2022. In August 2021, she performed at Lollapalooza in Chicago as part of a Bumble-sponsored program for women.

In January 2022, she released the EP I'm Sorry, Tokyo, featuring the single "Oldest," which draws on her New Jersey childhood.

=== American Song Contest and breakthrough ===
Alexx represented New Jersey in the debut season of NBC's American Song Contest in 2022, performing the original song "I Don't Take Pictures Anymore." The Eurovision-inspired competition, hosted by Kelly Clarkson and Snoop Dogg, featured state representatives competing with original songs.

Her 2022 single "All My Exes' Moms," co-written during a 2021 AAPI songwriting camp in Los Angeles, went viral via a TikTok reaction video by Joaquin, leading to over a million views for its music video. The song won first place in the Pop category of the 2023 American Songwriter Song Contest. She opened for artists including Lostboycrow, Arrows in Action, and Nicotine Dolls, and quit her editing job in 2023 to focus on music full-time. In 2024, she was named one of the Recording Academy's 10 emerging AAPI artists to watch.

=== Debut album ===
On October 4, 2024, Alexx released her debut album Big Mouth, an 11-track pop collection described as a "goodbye letter to her 20s" with themes of gossip, secrets, and personal angst, influenced by artists like Olivia Rodrigo and Alanis Morissette. Tracks include "Super Famous," "Move to LA (I Don't Wanna)," and "Girlfriend," alongside "All My Exes' Moms." Atwood Magazine conducted an interview with Alexx about the album where she revealed the songs are about her life and "are in chronological order on the album."

=== Second album ===
In August 28, 2026, Alexx released her second album "Dream Girl" an 11- track album with songs like "Dream Girl", "Housewife", "15 late" and eight more.

== Touring ==
Alexx launched her first headlining tour, the Big Mouth Tour, on October 12, 2024, in Saint Paul, Minnesota, sponsored by Mastercard and Ones to Watch. The tour included stops in Chicago, Denver, Seattle, Los Angeles, Austin, Nashville (with opener Joaquin), New York City, Washington D.C. (sold out), and Toronto, concluding on November 9, 2024. Earlier performances included a June 2022 show at White Eagle Hall in Jersey City.

== Discography ==
=== Studio albums ===
- Big Mouth (2024)
- Dream girl (2026)

=== Extended plays ===
- Me (2020)
- I'm Sorry, Tokyo (2022)
