= Gerrit Haring House =

Historic house in New Jersey, United States

- U.S. National Register of Historic Places
- New Jersey Register of Historic Places
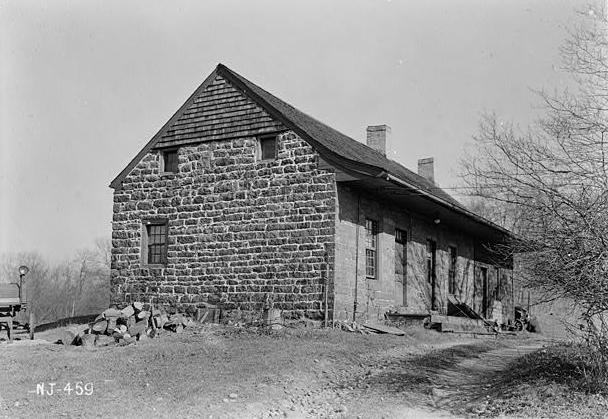

- Location within Bergen County, New Jersey Location within New Jersey Location within the United States
- Location: 224 Old Tappan Road, Old Tappan, New Jersey
- Coordinates: 41°0′47″N 73°59′12″W
- Area: 5.5 acres (2.2 ha)
- MPS: Stone Houses of Bergen County TR
- NRHP reference No.: 83001514
- NJRHP No.: 607

Significant dates
- Added to NRHP: January 10, 1983
- Designated NJRHP: October 3, 1980

Gerrit Haring House is a historic house at 224 Old Tappan Road in Old Tappan, Bergen County, New Jersey, United States.

This mid-eighteenth-century house was added to the National Register of Historic Places in 1983.

== See also ==
- National Register of Historic Places listings in Bergen County, New Jersey
