= Haring–Vervalen House =

Historic house in New Jersey, United States

- U.S. National Register of Historic Places
- New Jersey Register of Historic Places
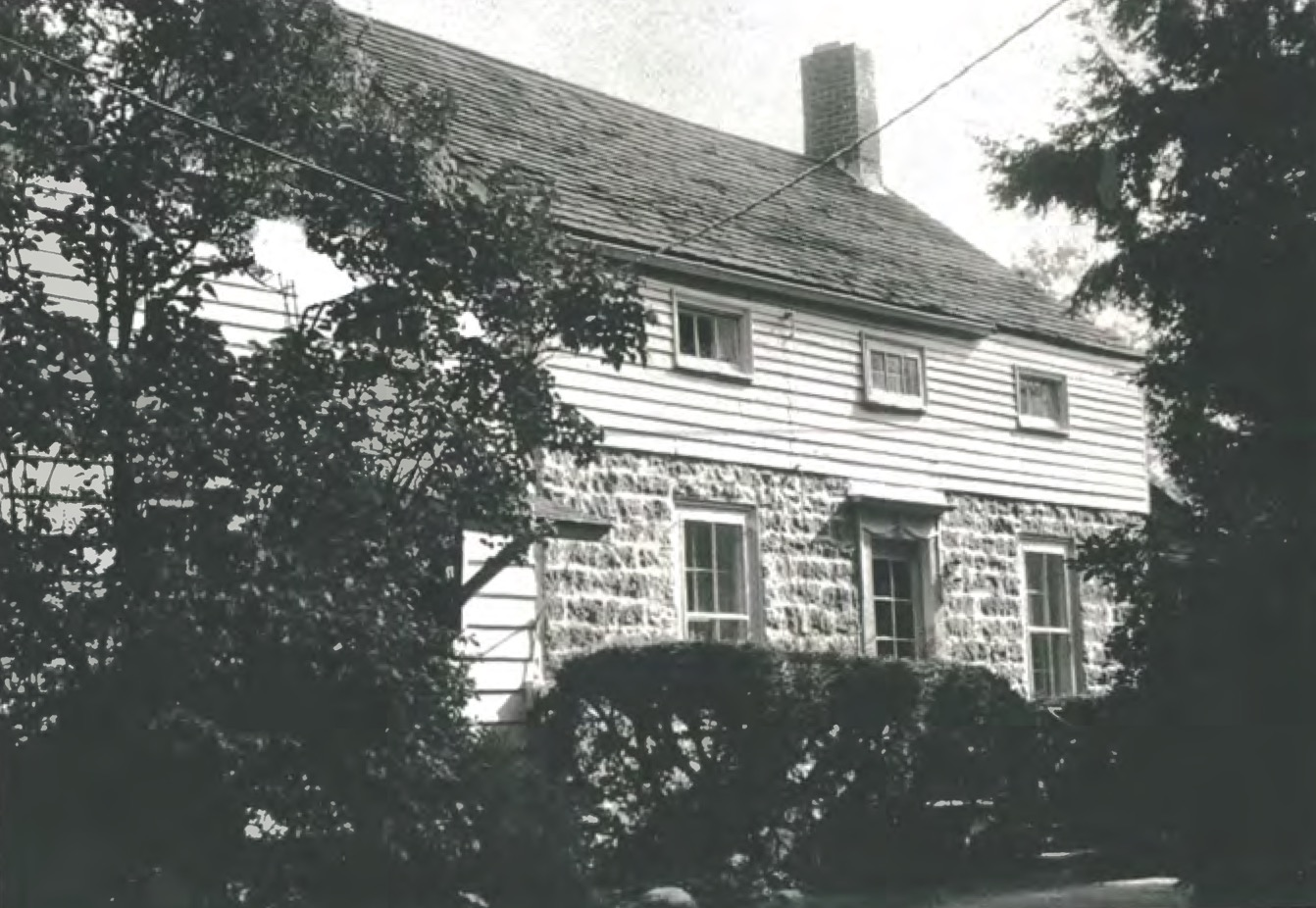

- Location within Bergen County, New Jersey Location within New Jersey Location within the United States
- Location: 200 Tappan Road, Norwood, New Jersey
- Coordinates: 40°59′48″N 73°57′46″W
- Built: c. 1757
- MPS: Stone Houses of Bergen County TR
- NRHP reference No.: 83001517
- NJRHP No.: 594

Significant dates
- Added to NRHP: January 10, 1983
- Designated NJRHP: October 3, 1980

The Haring–Vervalen House was located at 200 Tappan Road in the borough of Norwood in Bergen County, New Jersey, United States. The historic stone house was built around 1757 based on history and architectural evidence. It was added to the National Register of Historic Places on January 10, 1983, for its significance in architecture. It was listed as part of the Early Stone Houses of Bergen County Multiple Property Submission (MPS). It was demolished in 2013.

Peter Haring bought 236 acres (96 ha) here in 1721. He sold the property to his son, Abraham Haring, in 1738. His son, Peter Haring, inherited it. He married Catharina Blauvelt in 1757 and likely built the house then. Henry Vervalen bought the property in 1819.

== See also ==
- National Register of Historic Places listings in Bergen County, New Jersey
