= Teunis Haring House =

Historic house in New Jersey, United States

- U.S. National Register of Historic Places
- New Jersey Register of Historic Places
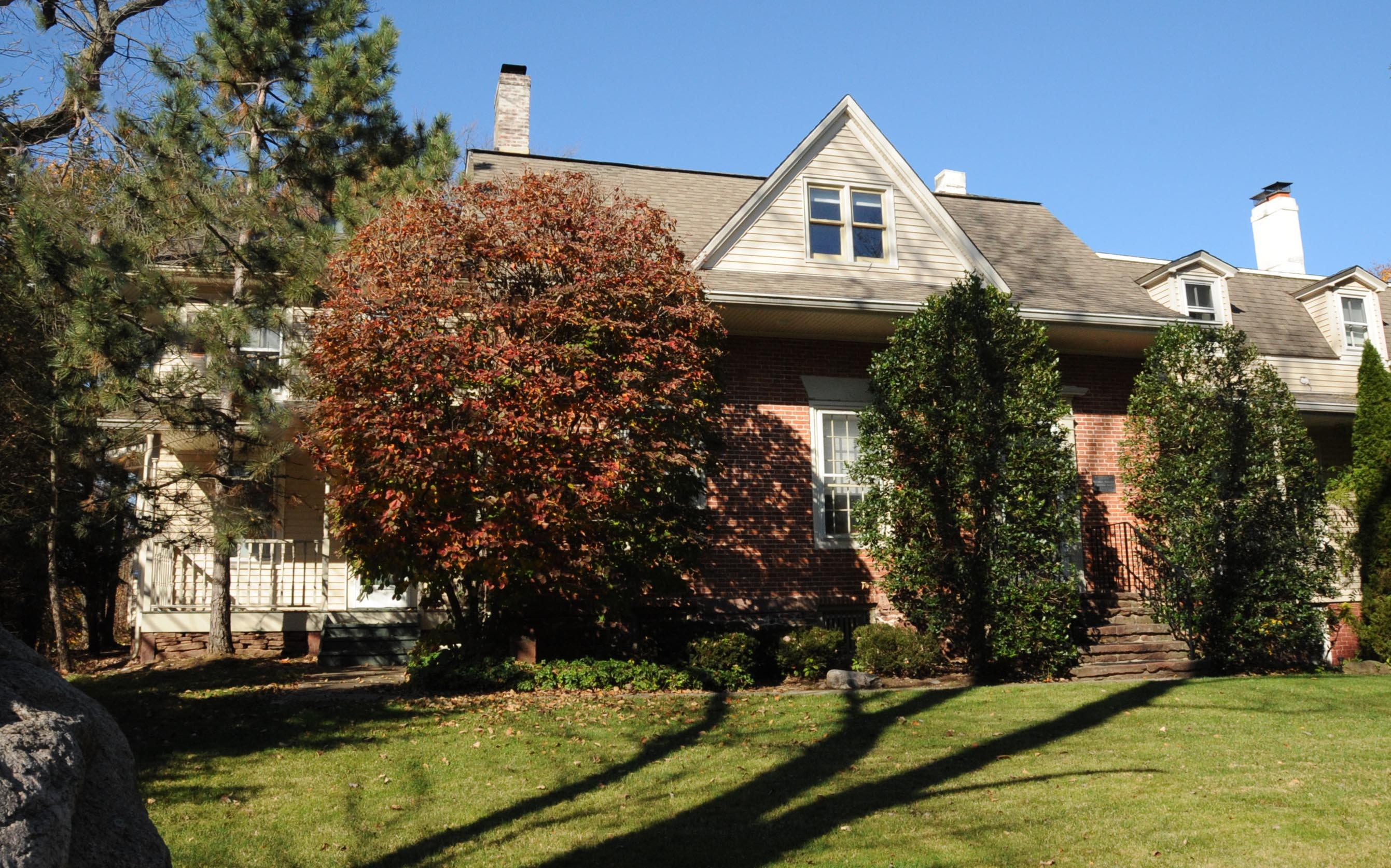

- Location within Bergen County, New Jersey Location within New Jersey Location within the United States
- Location: 70 Old Tappan Road, Old Tappan, New Jersey
- Coordinates: 41°1′14″N 73°58′5″W
- Area: 1.8 acres (0.73 ha)
- Built: 1810
- NRHP reference No.: 79001473
- NJRHP No.: 608

Significant dates
- Added to NRHP: April 20, 1979
- Designated NJRHP: July 12, 1978

Teunis Haring House is located in Old Tappan, Bergen County, New Jersey, United States. The house was built in 1810 and was added to the National Register of Historic Places on April 20, 1979.

== See also ==
- National Register of Historic Places listings in Bergen County, New Jersey
