= Nicholas Haring House =

Historic house in New Jersey, United States

- U.S. National Register of Historic Places
- U.S. Historic district – Contributing property
- New Jersey Register of Historic Places
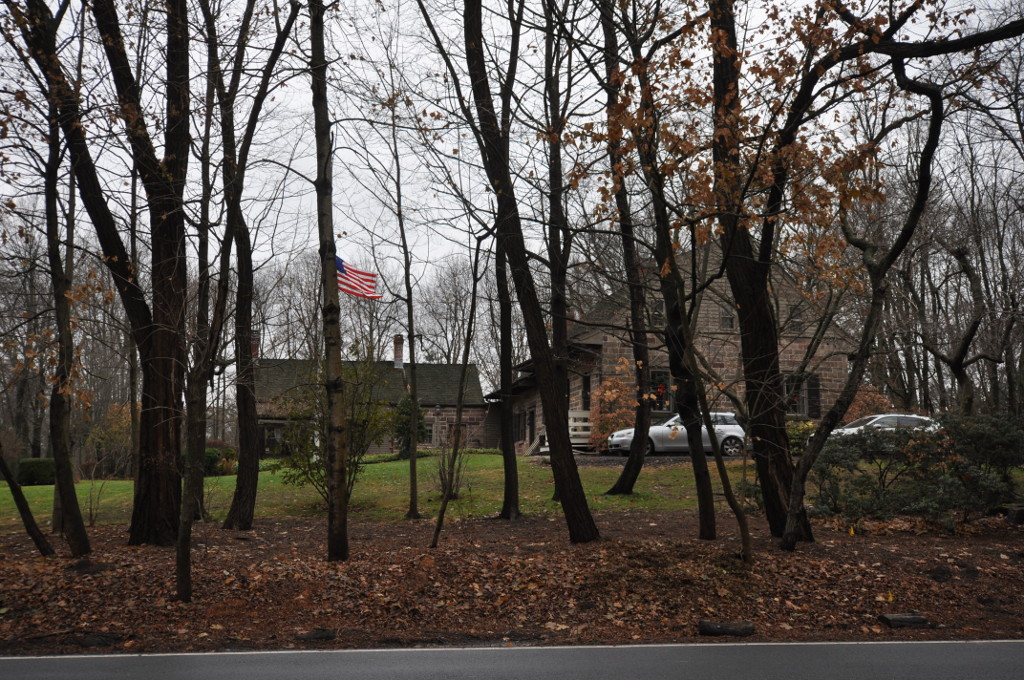

- Location within Bergen County, New Jersey Location within New Jersey Location within the United States
- Location: 5 Piermont Road, Rockleigh, New Jersey
- Coordinates: 40°59′45″N 73°55′53″W
- Built: 1805
- Part of: Rockleigh Historic District (ID77000845)
- MPS: Stone Houses of Bergen County TR
- NRHP reference No.: 83001515
- NJRHP No.: 662

Significant dates
- Added to NRHP: January 10, 1983
- Designated CP: June 29, 1977
- Designated NJRHP: October 10, 1980

The Nicholas Haring House, also known as the John A. Haring House, is located at 5 Piermont Road in the borough of Rockleigh in Bergen County, New Jersey, United States. The historic stone house was built in 1805 and was documented by the Historic American Buildings Survey (HABS) in 1936. It was listed as a contributing property of the Rockleigh Historic District on June 29, 1977. It was later added individually to the National Register of Historic Places on January 10, 1983, for its significance in architecture and exploration/settlement. It was listed as part of the Early Stone Houses of Bergen County Multiple Property Submission (MPS).

According to the nomination form, the house was built by Nicholas Haring in 1805 and the barn was built in 1806.

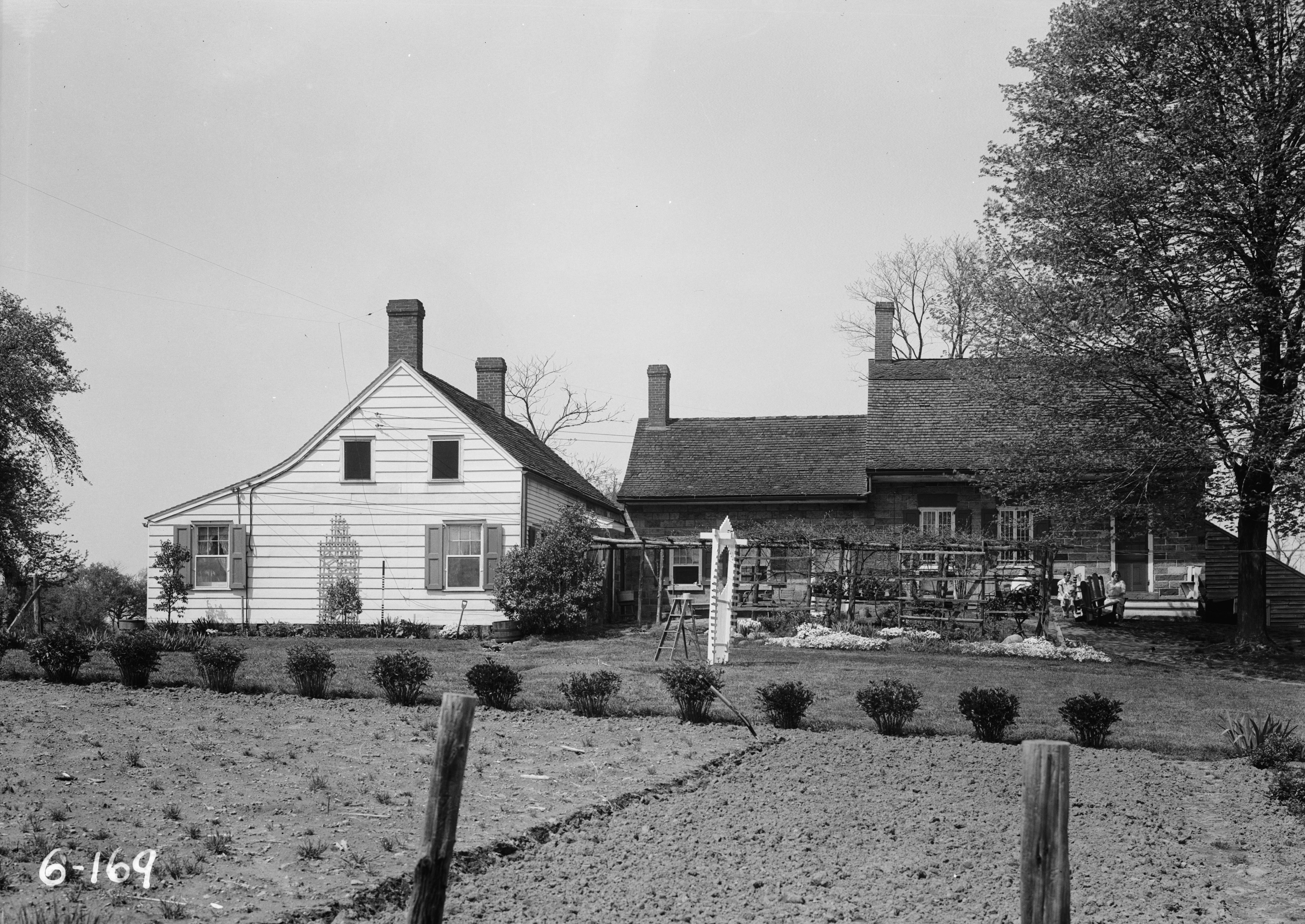
HABS photo from 1936

== See also ==
- National Register of Historic Places listings in Bergen County, New Jersey
