= Haring–DeWolf House =

Historic house in New Jersey, United States

- U.S. National Register of Historic Places
- New Jersey Register of Historic Places
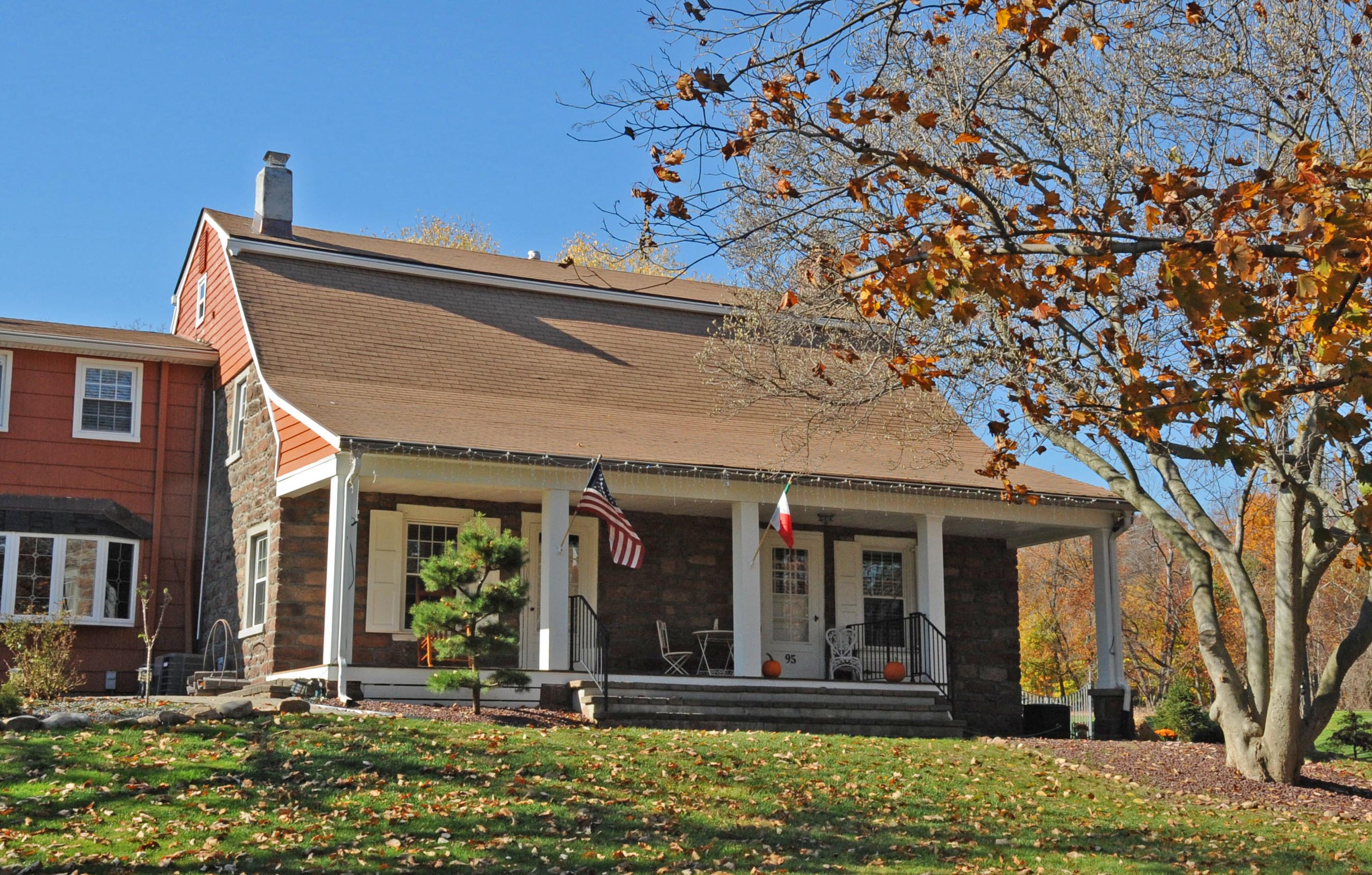

- Location within Bergen County, New Jersey Location within New Jersey Location within the United States
- Location: 95 De Wolf Road, Old Tappan, New Jersey
- Coordinates: 41°1′28″N 73°58′42″W
- MPS: Stone Houses of Bergen County TR
- NRHP reference No.: 83001512
- NJRHP No.: 609

Significant dates
- Added to NRHP: January 10, 1983
- Designated NJRHP: October 3, 1980

The Haring–DeWolf House is located at 95 De Wolf Road in the borough of Old Tappan in Bergen County, New Jersey, United States. The historic stone house was documented as the Dewerk Peter Herring House by the Historic American Buildings Survey (HABS) in 1936. It was added to the National Register of Historic Places on January 10, 1983, for its significance in architecture. It was listed as part of the Early Stone Houses of Bergen County Multiple Property Submission (MPS).

According to the nomination form, the house was built around 1704–1712 by Cosyn Haring. A frame wing was added in 1776. Martin De Wolf was living here in 1876.

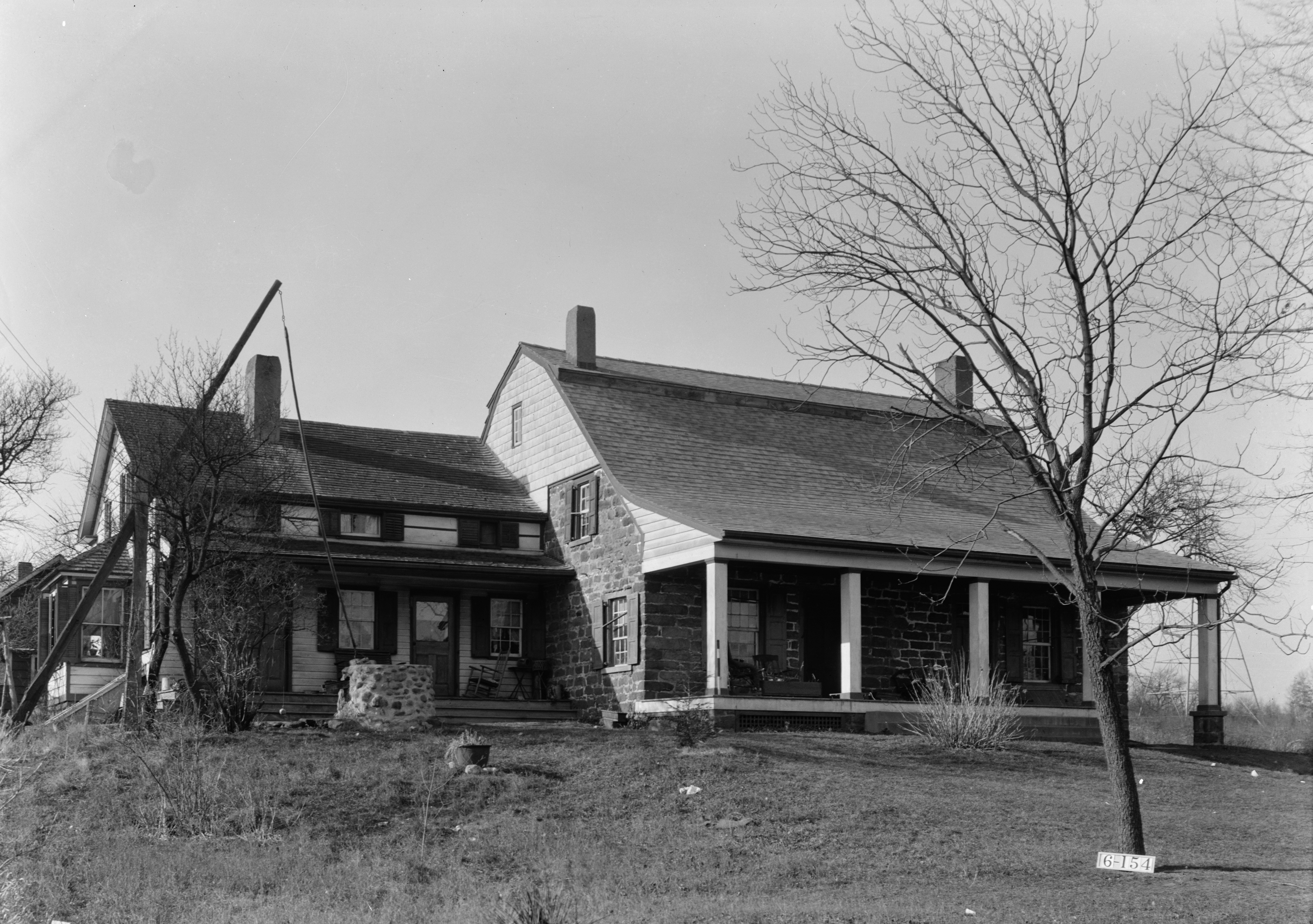
HABS photo from 1936

== See also ==
- National Register of Historic Places listings in Bergen County, New Jersey
