= Blanch–Haring House =

Historic house in New Jersey, US

- U.S. National Register of Historic Places
- New Jersey Register of Historic Places
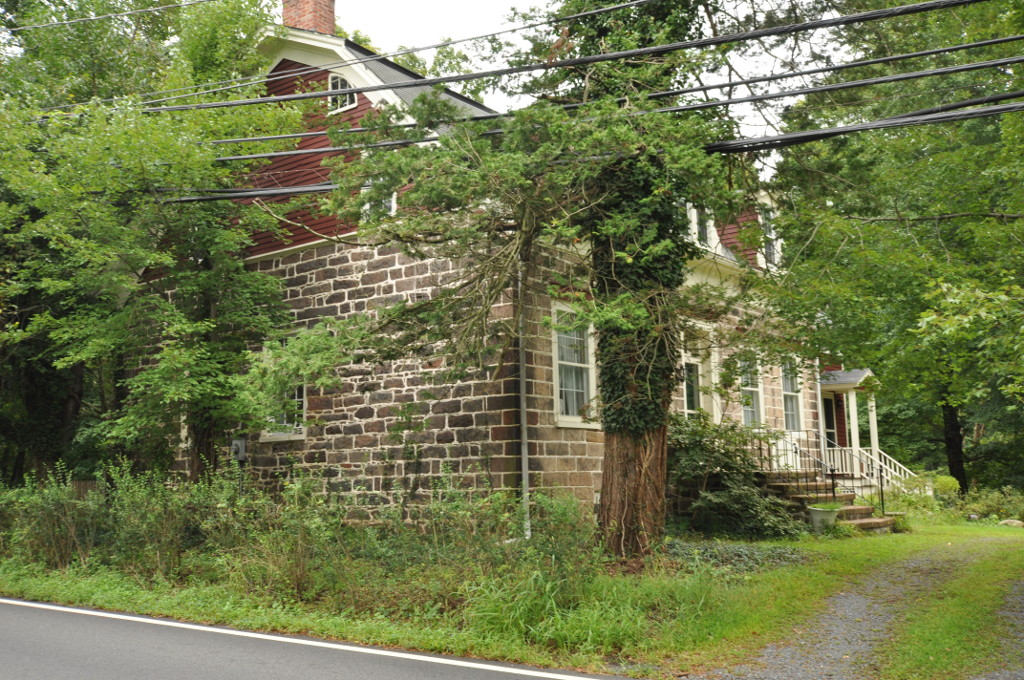
- Blanch–Haring House in 2008

- Location within Bergen County, New Jersey Location within New Jersey Location within the United States
- Location: 341 Lafayette Road, Harrington Park, New Jersey
- Coordinates: 40°59′27″N 73°58′33″W
- MPS: Stone Houses of Bergen County TR
- NRHP reference No.: 83001471
- NJRHP No.: 526

Significant dates
- Added to NRHP: January 9, 1983
- Designated NJRHP: October 3, 1980

The Blanch–Haring House is located at 341 Lafayette Road in the borough of Harrington Park in Bergen County, New Jersey, United States. The historic stone house was added to the National Register of Historic Places on January 9, 1983, for its significance in architecture and exploration/settlement. It was listed as part of the Early Stone Houses of Bergen County Multiple Property Submission (MPS).

According to the nomination form, the house was likely built after the American Revolutionary War and features Federal architecture. A frame wing was added in 1967. Richard Blanch bought a tract of land here from Isaac Blauvelt around 1745–1747. His son, Isaac Blanch, inherited the property in 1767. He sold it to David Haring in 1778. Rachel Haring married Peter A. Demarest in 1850 and were living here in 1861.

== See also ==
- National Register of Historic Places listings in Bergen County, New Jersey
