= Microscale chemistry =

Microscale chemistry (often referred to as small-scale chemistry, in German: Chemie im Mikromaßstab) is an analytical method and also a teaching method widely used at school and at university levels, working with small quantities of chemical substances. While much of traditional chemistry teaching centers on multi-gramme preparations, milligrammes of substances are sufficient for microscale chemistry. In universities, modern and expensive lab glassware is used and modern methods for detection and characterization of the produced substances are very common. In schools and in many countries of the Southern hemisphere, small-scale working takes place with low-cost and even no-cost material. There has always been a place for small-scale working in qualitative analysis, but the new developments can encompass much of chemistry a student is likely to meet.

== History ==
There are two main strands of the modern approach. One is based on the idea that many of the experiments associated with general chemistry (acids and bases, oxidation and reduction, electrochemistry, etc.) can be carried out in equipment much simpler (injection bottles, dropper bottles, syringes, wellplates, plastic pipettes) and therefore cheaper than the traditional glassware in a laboratory, thus enabling the expansion of the laboratory experiences of students in large classes and to introduce laboratory work into institutions too poorly equipped for standard-type work. Pioneering development in this area was carried out by Egerton C. Grey (1928), Mahmoud K. El-Marsafy (1989) in Egypt, Stephen Thompson in the US and others. A further application of these ideas was the devising by Bradley of the Radmaste kits in South Africa, designed to make effective chemical experiments possible in developing countries in schools that lack the technical services (electricity, running water) taken for granted in many places. The other strand is the introduction of this approach into synthetic work, mainly in organic chemistry. Here the crucial breakthrough was achieved by Mayo, Pike and Butcher and by Williamson who demonstrated that inexperienced students were able to carry out organic syntheses on a few tens of milligrams, a skill previously thought to require years of training and experience. These approaches were accompanied by the introduction of some specialised equipment, which was subsequently simplified by Breuer without great loss of versatility.

There is a great deal of published material available to help in the introduction of such a scheme, providing advice on choice of equipment, techniques and preparative experiments and the flow of such material is continuing through a column in the Journal of Chemical Education called 'The Microscale Laboratory' that has been running for many years. Scaling down experiments, when combined with modern projection technology, opened up the possibility of carrying out lecture demonstrations of the most hazardous kind in total safety. The approach has been adopted worldwide. It has become a major presence on the educational scene in the US, it is used to a lesser extent in the UK and it is used in many countries in institutions with staff who are enthusiastic about it. For example, in India, small scale chemistry/ microscale chemistry is now implemented in a few universities and colleges.

== Advantages ==
- Saves time for preparation and clear away
- Reduces waste at the source
- More safety
- Lower costs for chemical substances and equipment
- Smaller storage area
- Reduced reliance on intensive ventilation systems
- Pleasant working atmosphere
- Shorter reaction times
- More time for evaluation and communication.

== Centres ==
- Austria Viktor Obendrauf
- China Zhou Ning-Huai
- Egypt Mahmoud K. El-Marsafy
- Germany Angela Koehler-Kruetzfeld, Peter Schwarz, Waltraud Habelitz-Tkotz, Michael Tausch, John McCaskill, Theodor Grofe, Bernd-Heinrich Brand, Gregor von Borstel, Stephan Mattusek
- Hong Kong Winghong Chan
- Israel Mordechai Livneh
- Japan Kazuko Ogino
- Macedonia Metodija Najdoski
- Mexico Jorge Ibanez, Arturo Fregoso, Carmen Doria, Rosa Maria Mainero, Margarita Hernandez, et al.
- Poland Aleksander Kazubski, Dominika Strutyńska, Łukasz Sporny, Piotr Wróblewski
- Portugal M. Elisa Maia
- South Africa John Bradley Marie DuToit
- Sweden Christer Gruvberg
- USA
  - National Microscale Chemistry Center
  - USA National Small Scale Chemistry Center
  - USA Microscale Gas Chemistry; Bruce Mattson
  - Kenneth M. Doxsee
- Thailand Supawan Tantyanon
- Kuwait Abdulaziz Alnajjar
- India Govt. Victoria College, Palakkad, Kerala
- United Kingdom Bob Worley, CLEAPSS, Chis LLoyd SSERC

== Conferences ==
1st International Symposium on Microscale Chemistry May 2000 at Universidad Iberoamericana – Ciudad de Mexico

2nd International Symposium on Microscale Chemistry 13. – 15. December 2001 at Hong Kong Baptist University – Hong Kong

3rd International Symposium on Microscale Chemistry 18. – 20. May 2005 at Universidad Iberoamericana – Ciudad de Mexico """]]]

4th International Symposium on Microscale Chemistry Bangkok, Thailand 2009

5th International Symposium on Microscale Chemistry Manila, Philippines, 2010

6th International Symposium on Microscale Chemistry Kuwait City, Kuwait, 2011

7th International Symposium on Microscale Chemistry Berlin, Germany, 2013

8th International Symposium on Microscale Chemistry Mexico City, Mexico, 2015

9th International Symposium on Microscale Chemistry Sendai, Japan, 2017

10th International Symposium on Microscale Chemistry, North-west University, Potchefstroom South Africa, 2019

11th International Symposium on Microscale Chemistry. On-line, United Kingdom, 2021^{[11]}

== See also ==
- Microanalysis
- Microreactor
