= Blauvelt House (Norwood, New Jersey) =

Historic house in New Jersey, US

- U.S. National Register of Historic Places
- New Jersey Register of Historic Places
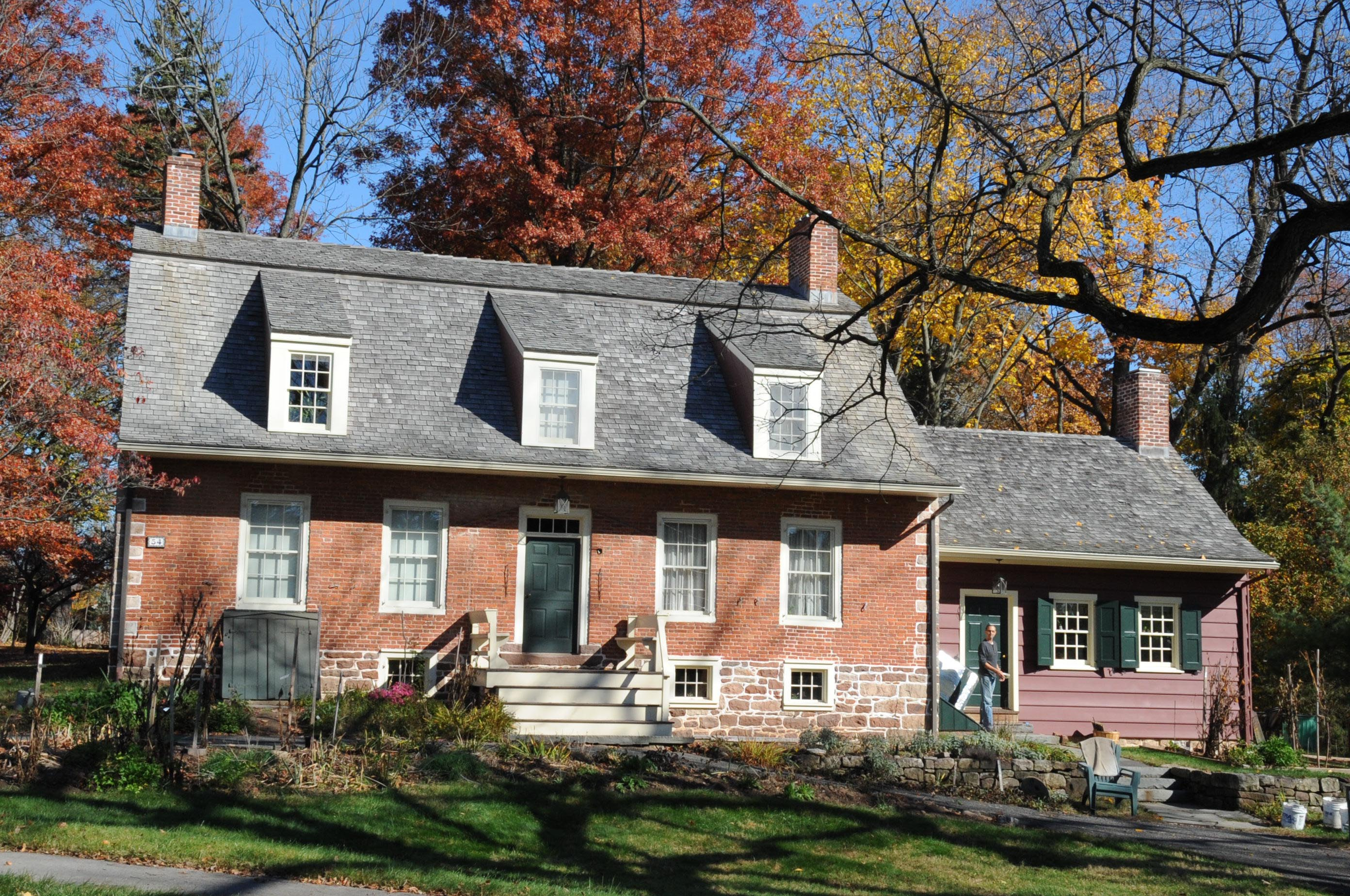

- Location within Bergen County, New Jersey Location within New Jersey Location within the United States
- Location: 54 Tappan Road, Norwood, New Jersey
- Coordinates: 40°59′33″N 73°57′59″W
- MPS: Stone Houses of Bergen County TR
- NRHP reference No.: 83001474
- NJRHP No.: 591

Significant dates
- Added to NRHP: January 10, 1983
- Designated NJRHP: October 3, 1980

The Blauvelt House is located at 54 Tappan Road in the borough of Norwood in Bergen County, New Jersey, United States. The historic stone house was added to the National Register of Historic Places on January 10, 1983, for its significance in architecture. It was listed as part of the Early Stone Houses of Bergen County Multiple Property Submission (MPS).

Described as a lovely example of early Dutch craftsmanship by the nomination form, the house was likely built by a member of the Blauvelt family before the American Revolutionary War based on architectural evidence. The south side is constructed with bricks. It was owned by William Atwater in 1876. It was restored in 1930 by G. Semendinger.

== See also ==
- National Register of Historic Places listings in Bergen County, New Jersey
