= Abraham A. Haring House =

Historic house in New Jersey, United States

- U.S. National Register of Historic Places
- New Jersey Register of Historic Places
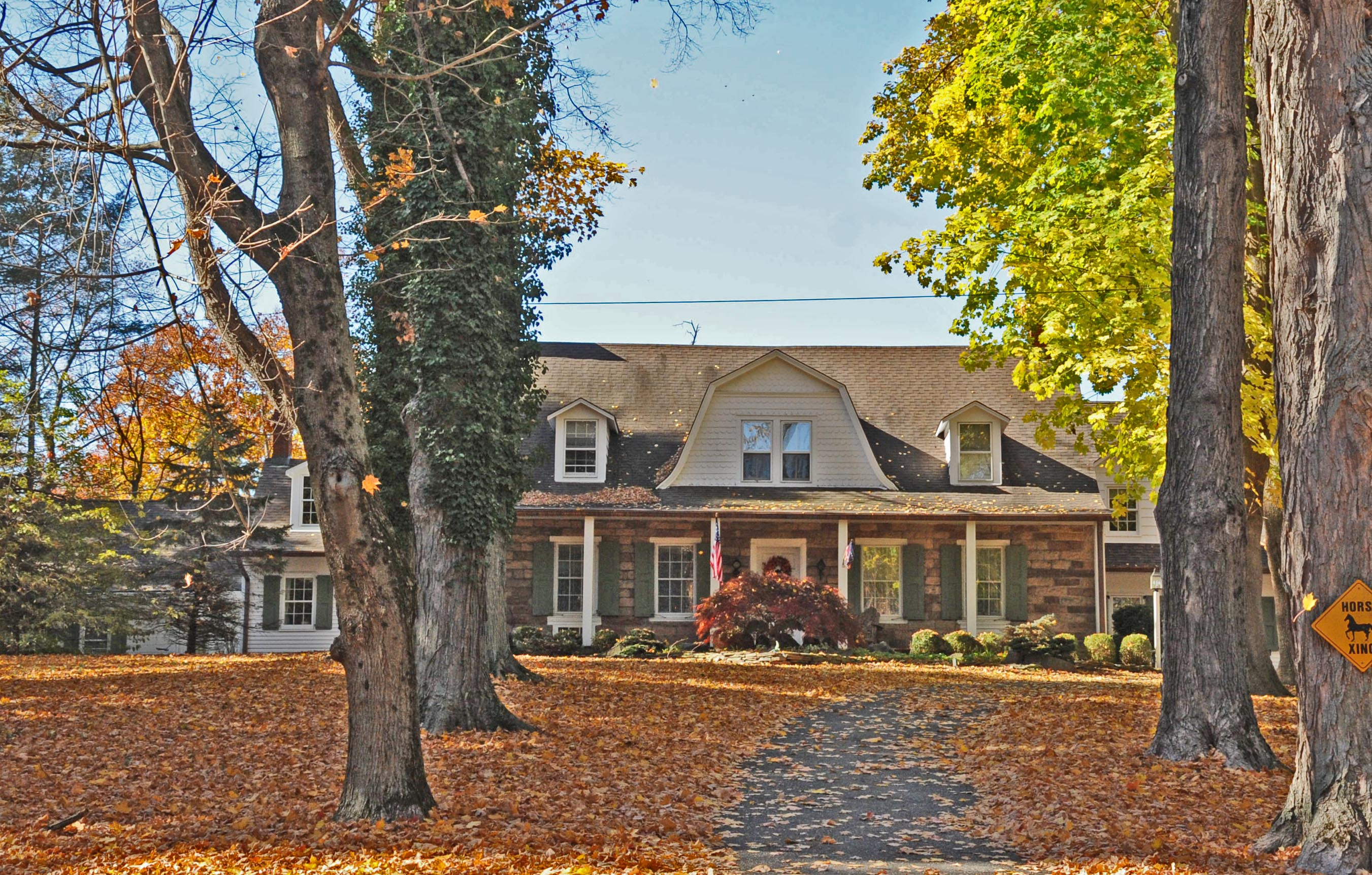
- Abraham A. Haring House in 2008

- Location within Bergen County, New Jersey Location within New Jersey Location within the United States
- Location: Piermont Road, Rockleigh, New Jersey
- Coordinates: 40°59′50″N 73°55′56″W
- Area: 15.4 acres (6.2 ha)
- Built: 1758
- Architects: Haring, Abraham A.
- MPS: Stone Houses of Bergen County TR
- NRHP reference No.: 83001510
- NJRHP No.: 661

Significant dates
- Added to NRHP: January 10, 1983
- Designated NJRHP: October 3, 1980

Abraham A. Haring House is located in Rockleigh, Bergen County, New Jersey, United States. The house was built in 1758 and was added to the National Register of Historic Places on January 10, 1983.

== See also ==
- National Register of Historic Places listings in Bergen County, New Jersey
