= Haring–Corning House =

Historic house in New Jersey, United States

- U.S. National Register of Historic Places
- New Jersey Register of Historic Places
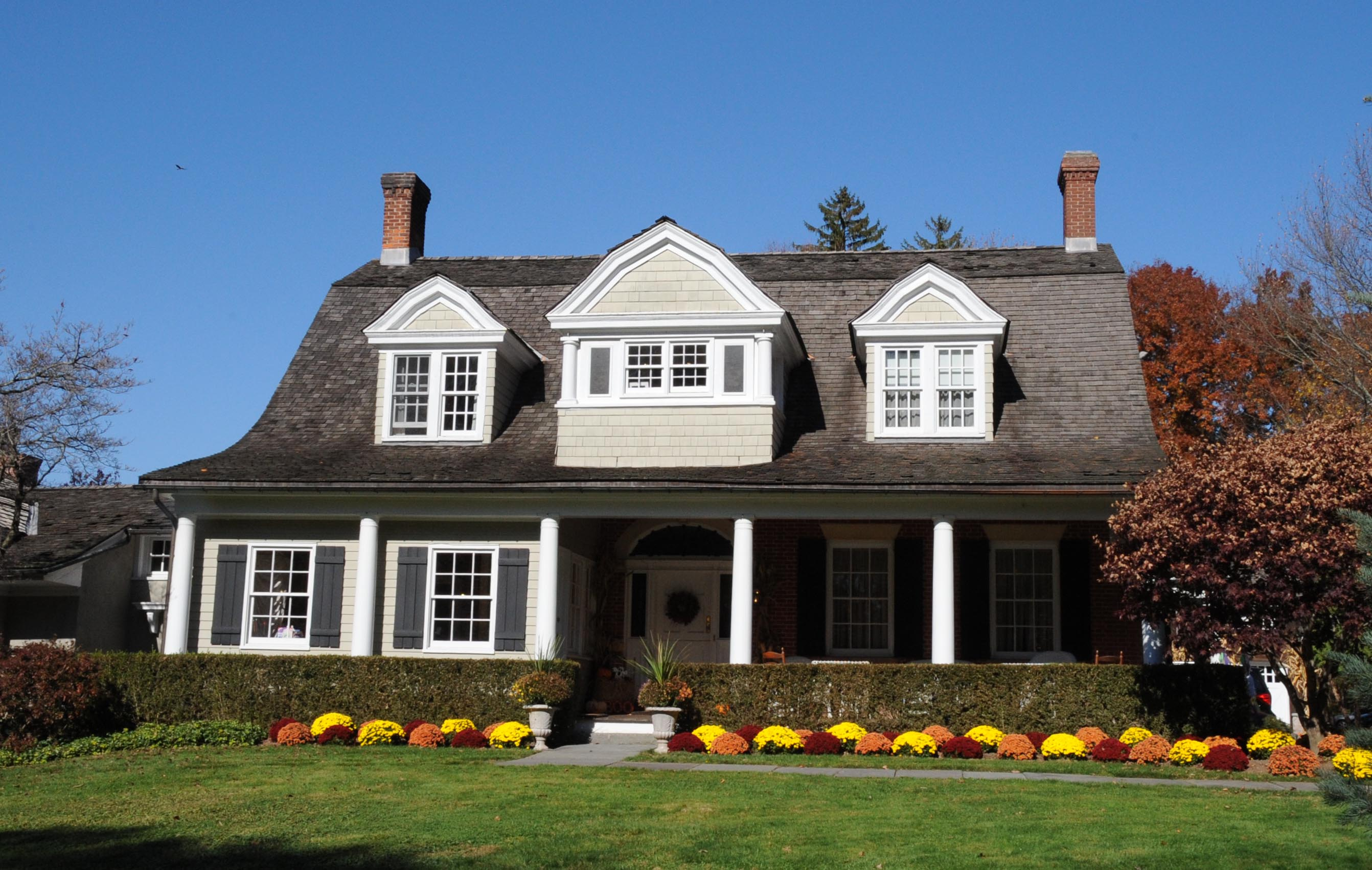

- Location within Bergen County, New Jersey Location within New Jersey Location within the United States
- Location: Rockleigh Road, Rockleigh, New Jersey
- Coordinates: 40°59′58″N 73°55′48″W
- Area: 5.4 acres (2.2 ha)
- Built: 1741
- MPS: Stone Houses of Bergen County TR
- NRHP reference No.: 85002589
- NJRHP No.: 663

Significant dates
- Added to NRHP: August 8, 1985
- Designated NJRHP: October 3, 1980

The Haring–Corning House is located in the borough of Rockleigh in Bergen County, New Jersey, United States. The historic stone house was built in 1741 and was added to the National Register of Historic Places on August 8, 1985, for its significance in architecture and exploration/settlement. It was listed as part of the Early Stone Houses of Bergen County Multiple Property Submission (MPS).

== History ==
The original section of the house was built in 1741 by Abraham D. Haring. A large Dutch Colonial style addition was added to the house in 1828. Samuel B. Corning purchased the house in 1856. The businessman Jenkins Sloat purchased the house in 1870 and operated a sawmill on the property.

William L. Tait, the first mayor of Rockleigh, owned the house from 1913 to 1930. Tait added a wing to the house, a veranda and extended the central dormer. The Rose Haven School for girls used the house as living space from 1930 to 1983.

== See also ==
- National Register of Historic Places listings in Bergen County, New Jersey
