= Haring–Blauvelt–Demarest House =

- U.S. National Register of Historic Places
- New Jersey Register of Historic Places
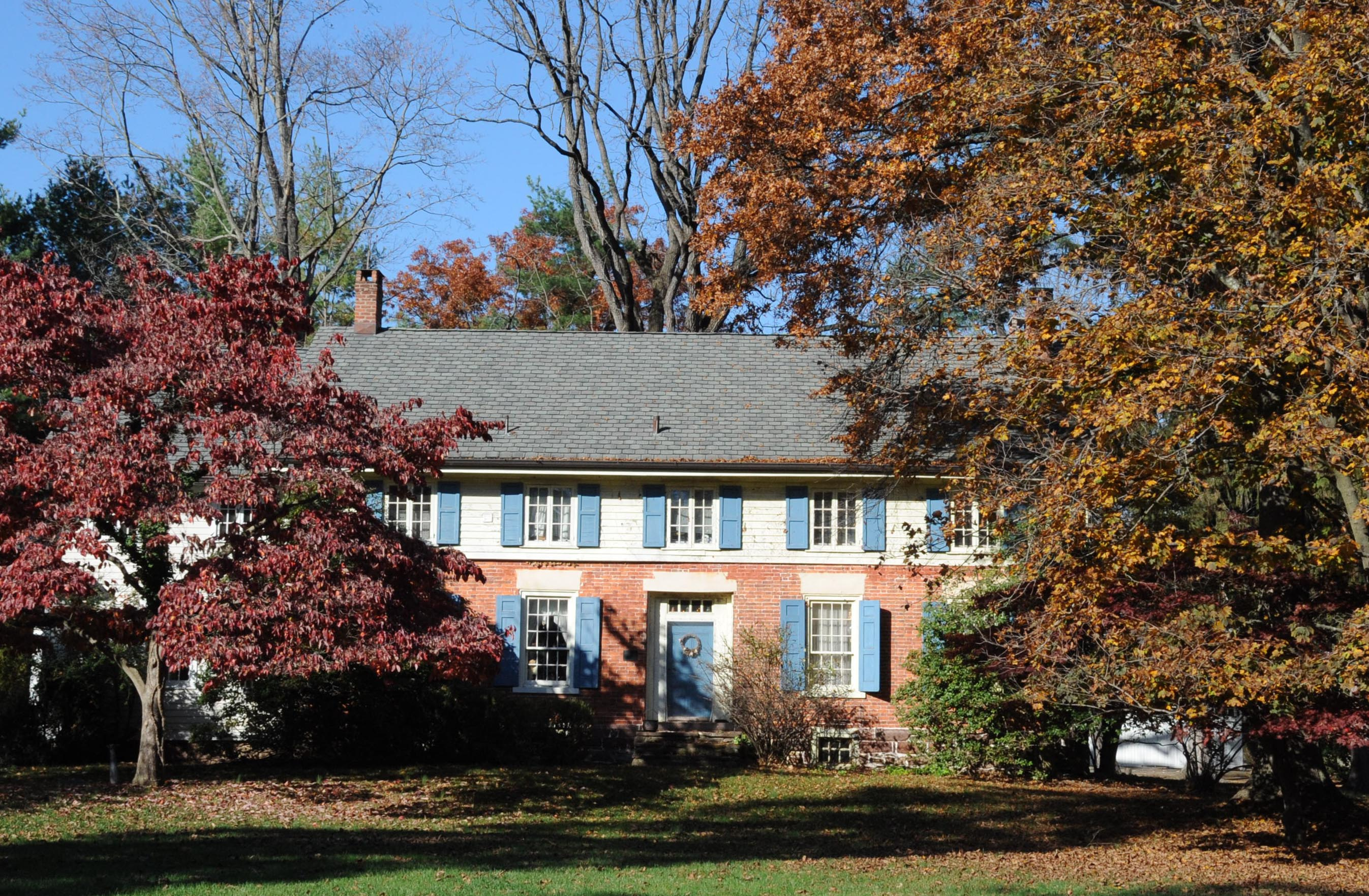

- Location within Bergen County, New Jersey Location within New Jersey Location within the United States
- Location: 525 Rivervale Road, River Vale, New Jersey
- Coordinates: 41°00′57″N 74°00′39″W
- Area: 2.4 acres (0.97 ha)
- MPS: Stone Houses of Bergen County TR
- NRHP reference No.: 83001509
- NJRHP No.: 657

Significant dates
- Added to NRHP: January 10, 1983
- Designated NJRHP: October 3, 1980

The Haring–Blauvelt–Demarest House is located at 525 Rivervale Road in the township of River Vale in Bergen County, New Jersey, United States. The historic stone house was added to the National Register of Historic Places on January 10, 1983, for its significance in architecture. It was listed as part of the Early Stone Houses of Bergen County Multiple Property Submission (MPS).

According to the nomination form, the house was built before the American Revolutionary War based on a map by Robert Erskine. Cornelius Cornelius Haring lived here. His sons served in the British army. After the Baylor Massacre, the house was confiscated and sold to Henry Wisner. Garret Blauvelt bought it around 1783 or 1784. John J. Demarest purchased the house in 1853.

== See also ==
- National Register of Historic Places listings in Bergen County, New Jersey
