= Blauvelt–Demarest House =

Historic house in New Jersey, US

- U.S. National Register of Historic Places
- New Jersey Register of Historic Places
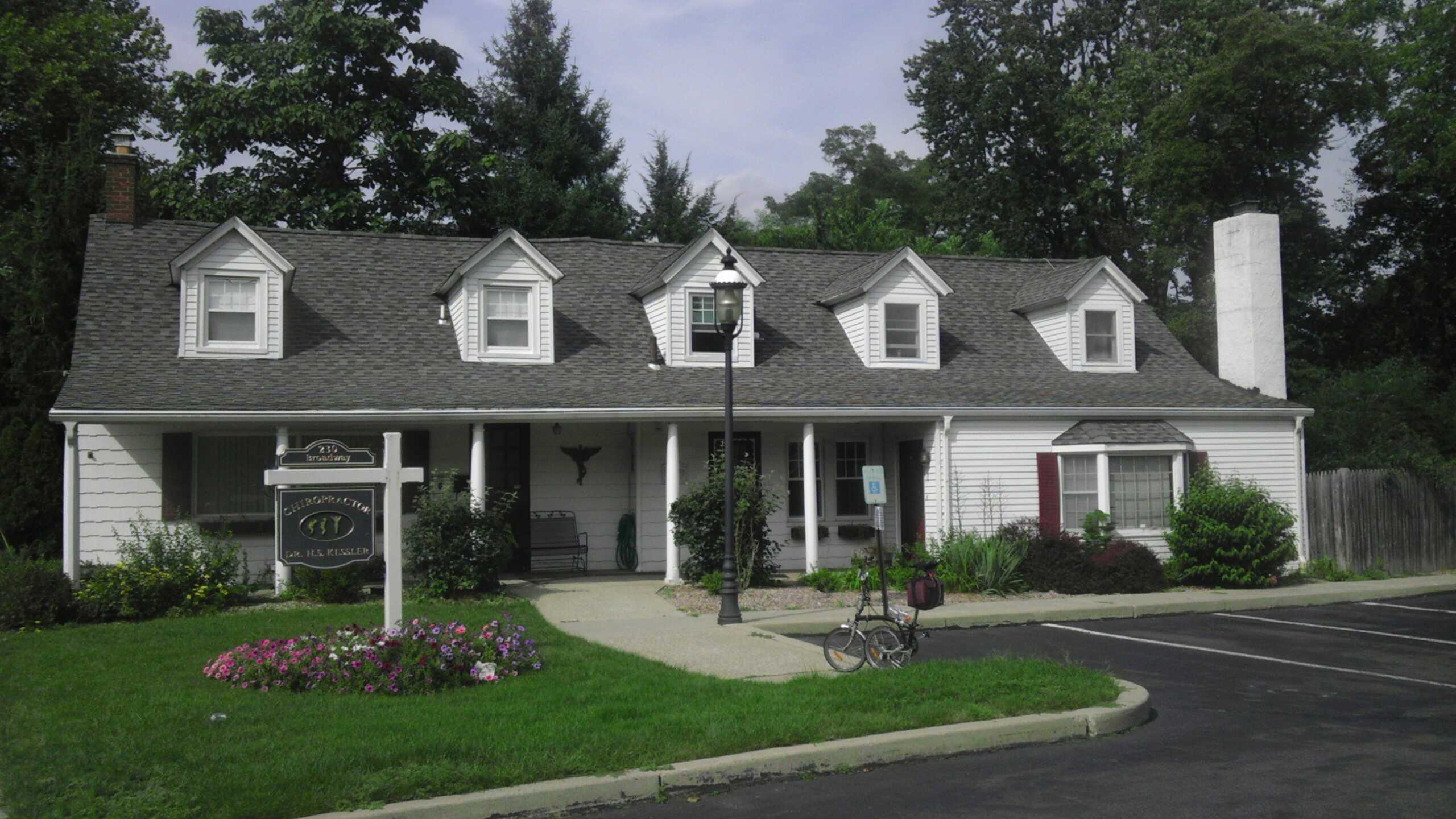

- Location within Bergen County, New Jersey Location within New Jersey Location within the United States
- Location: 230 Broadway, Hillsdale, New Jersey
- Coordinates: 41°0′25″N 74°2′28″W
- Built: c. 1740
- MPS: Stone Houses of Bergen County TR
- NRHP reference No.: 83001472
- NJRHP No.: 535

Significant dates
- Added to NRHP: January 9, 1983
- Designated NJRHP: October 3, 1980

The Blauvelt–Demarest House is located at 230 Broadway in the borough of Hillsdale in Bergen County, New Jersey, United States. The historic stone house was built around 1740 based on architectural evidence and was added to the National Register of Historic Places on January 9, 1983, for its significance in architecture. It was listed as part of the Early Stone Houses of Bergen County Multiple Property Submission (MPS).

According to the nomination form, Arie Blauvelt is thought have built the house around the time of his marriage in 1737. His son, Garret A. Blauvelt, inherited it in 1748. Garret Demarest purchased it between 1769 and 1775. It remained in the Demarest family until 1842.

== See also ==
- National Register of Historic Places listings in Bergen County, New Jersey
