= Swing Bridge at New Bridge Landing =

- Draw Bridge at New Bridge
- U.S. National Register of Historic Places
- New Jersey Register of Historic Places
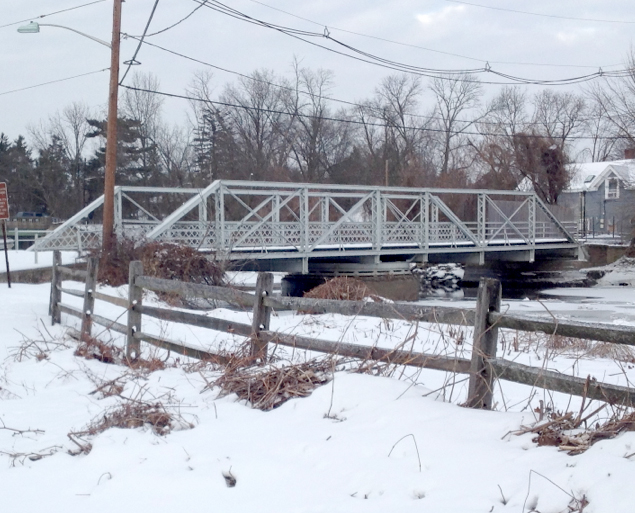

- Location within Bergen County, New Jersey
- Location: Main Street and Old New Bridge Road over the Hackensack River, New Milford, New Jersey
- Coordinates: 40°54′51″N 74°1′48″W
- Area: 0.4 acres (0.16 ha)
- Built: 1888
- Architects: Stagg, Joseph W.; King Bridge Company
- Architectural style: Pratt-type low truss bridge
- NRHP reference No.: 89000775
- NJRHP No.: 655

Significant dates
- Added to NRHP: July 5, 1989
- Designated NJRHP: May 22, 1989

The bridge at New Bridge Landing, New Jersey was built in 1888 to replace an earlier wooden one, and was added to the National Register of Historic Places on July 5, 1989.

== History ==
According to historian Kevin Wright, the extant iron swing bridge at New Bridge Landing occupies the site of a series of wooden drawbridges that have spanned the narrows of the Hackensack River at New Bridge since 1745. Until 1790, this was the first river crossing above Newark Bay and so carried overland traffic between Manhattan and the interior of North America. The bridge became vitally important during the American Revolution and was crossed by General George Washington at the head of the retreating garrison of Fort Lee on November 20, 1776, earning its appellation as the Bridge That Saved A Nation. Hills on either side of New Bridge were fortified during the war to defend this strategic crossing and stone houses flanking the bridge served as forts, battleground, encampment ground and military headquarters in every year of the conflict. New Bridge was literally, "the crossroads of the American Revolution," having supposedly survived more of the war than any other spot in America.

Bergen County installed the extant iron swing bridge in 1889 as part of the ongoing replacement of outdated wooden drawbridges, which slowed the passage of ship traffic on the river. A drawbridge only opened one lane of traffic, while a swing bridge opened two, allowing boats to pass simultaneously in both directions. The Bergen County Board of Chosen Freeholders instructed a Bridge Committee to proceed with plans, specifications and cost estimates for a new structure to span the Hackensack River at the village of New Bridge at a special meeting in April 1888. Freeholder Zabriskie, heading the committee, put the cost of the proposed structure at about $9,000. On June 25, 1888, the Bridge Committee revised specifications for the new bridge and decided to re-advertise for bids. On the final day of June, they adopted their plans and specifications. In July 1888, contracts for erecting an iron bridge at New Bridge were awarded on the following bids:

Bridge Contracts: New Bridge Draw — Smith Bridge Co., $4,170; Penn. $4,390; Berlin, $4,287; Dean & Westbrook, $4,330; Variety, $4,390; Columbia, $4,345; Pittsburg, $4,467; King Iron, $3,990 — King Iron awarded contract. Bids for stone work — Joseph Stagg, $3,994; S. H. Vanderbeck, $4,324. Contract to Mr. Stagg.

Joseph W. Stagg, House Mover and Bridge Builder, resided in the Highland section of Englewood. In the final week of August 1888, Joseph Stagg commenced tearing down the bridge at New Bridge and began laying stone for the abutments. By the close of November 1888, the people of New Bridge were indignant. The old bridge had been torn down about August first and although contractor Joseph Stagg had completed his portion of the contract, no attempt had been made on the part of the new contractors to do their work and open the highway. A fire at their Cleveland foundry reportedly delayed the King Iron Bridge Company from completing its manufacture of bridge parts (perhaps explaining why the trusses bear the imprint of "Phoenix Iron"). The new iron swing bridge at New Bridge was finally opened on Monday, February 4, 1889. At their monthly meeting on that same date, the Board of Chosen Freeholders were presented a bill for $100 in favor of Joseph Stagg for building a temporary foot-bridge across the Hackensack River at Cherry Hill, which apparently served the citizens of New Bridge during the six months that they waited for the iron bridge to be installed. On March 2, 1889, Nicholas B. Demarest completed the work of filling in the approaches to the new span across the river at New Bridge. In June 1891, the Freeholders authorized payment of the following bridge-keepers: at Old Bridge, Bloomer Brothers, $20; at New Bridge, Abraham Leggett, $60. On August 15, 1892, according to newspaper reports, "a quartet of Hackensack youth with more or less “tanglefoot” [cheap whiskey] on board, did considerable mischief at Cherry Hill and New Bridge," placing the key to the drawbridge in position, thus endangering travel over the draw. A wooden sidewalk was built on the north side of the bridge in 1900.

On November 14, 1906, the caboose on the freight train, due at the Cherry Hill Station about 6:30 p.m., derailed while being switched from the northbound to the southbound tracks, thereby delaying traffic for about two hours. On the same night, the New Bridge got stuck in open position after passage of a boat, further delaying the people who had already been delayed by the caboose accident.

The bridge remained operational, principally for coal and lumber barges, until 1940 when replacement of the downstream bridge at Anderson Street, Hackensack, with a fixed span, closed the river upstream to navigation. A new roadway for extending Hackensack Avenue beyond its intersection with Main Street in River Edge, to an extension of New Bridge Road in New Milford was laid out in 1956 across the northwest corner of the Bergen County Historical Society's property, to a new concrete-and-steel bridge over the Hackensack River, 500' north of the iron truss bridge. Thus, the Bergen County Historical Society prevented construction of an elevated highway bridge immediately adjacent to the south gable-end of the historic Steuben House. The closing of the 1889 swing bridge to automotive traffic turned Main Street, River Edge, into a dead-end in front of the Steuben House. Old New Bridge Road (on the boundary between New Milford and Teaneck) likewise became a dead end.

The Army Corps of Engineers planned to destroy the old bridge as soon as the new one was completed. The Bergen County Historical Society and the Dumont Women's Club successfully petitioned to keep the historic span for a pedestrian crossing. Colonel John T. O’Neill, of the Army Corps of Engineers, yielded to Freeholder Walter M. Neill, who promised that Bergen County would henceforth maintain the old bridge, if it were spared.

Historians Claire Tholl and Kevin Wright provided the research for its listing on the New Jersey and National Registers of Historic Places as the "Draw Bridge at New Bridge" in 1989 to commemorate its centennial. It is recognized as the oldest surviving highway swing-bridge in the State of New Jersey. It can no longer rotate because it has been welded to the piers at either end.

With approval from the Historic New Bridge Landing Park Commission, Bergen County completed a rehabilitation and historic restoration of the 1889 Swing Bridge in October 2003.

== See also ==
- New Bridge Landing
- List of crossings of the Hackensack River
- National Register of Historic Places listings in Bergen County, New Jersey
- List of bridges on the National Register of Historic Places in New Jersey
