= New Bridge Landing =

Historic site in Bergen County, New Jersey

- Location within Bergen County, New Jersey Location within New Jersey Location within the United States
- Coordinates: 40°54′46″N 74°01′56″W

New Bridge was a prosperous mill hamlet, centered upon a bridge strategically placed at the narrows of the Hackensack River in Bergen County, New Jersey. In the American Revolution, New Bridge Landing was the site of a bridge crossing by General George Washington leading his troops in retreat November 20, 1776, from British forces that had captured New York City and threatened to entrap the Continental Army at Bergen Neck. Eleven engagements took place here throughout the war. The current Draw Bridge at New Bridge was installed in 1889, and added to the National Register of Historic Places on July 5, 1989. The area is now a New Jersey historic site, covering portions of New Milford, River Edge, Hackensack and Teaneck.

== History ==
New Bridge was settled by New Netherlanders known as the Bergen Dutch. It was an agricultural community, over time influenced by Dutch, Angolan African, German, English, French, Scotch and Scandinavian settlers.

In 1682, a Swedish land-clearer named Cornelius Mattyse acquired 420 acres at the juncture of Tantaqua's Creek (Cole's Brook) and the Hackensack River about ten miles above the head of Newark Bay. Known to Native Americans as Aschatking (where the river narrows), it had become called Tantaqua's Plain, where a Hackensack sachem of that name resided with his kinfolk. In 1695, Matheus Corneliuson, son of Cornelius Matheus of Hackinsack River, sold the land to David Ackerman of the village of Hackensack. Ackerman willed the portion lying east of Kinderkamack Road to his son, Johannes Ackerman, who built a dwelling on the Steenrapie (Kinderkamack) Road at the time of his marriage to Jannetje Lozier in 1713.

A waterwheel powered tidal gristmill was built on the Hackensack River at the mouth of Cole's Brook, where the high tide was trapped by a drop-gate dam. Sloops pulled alongside the mill at New Bridge Landing. On March 9, 1744, a road was surveyed from Kinderkamack Road to the narrows of the Hackensack River where a "New Bridge" was to be erected (forming what is now Main Street, River Edge).

Jan and Annetje (Ackerman) Zabriskie purchased the Johannes Ackerman mill and farm in September 1745, shortly after construction of the first draw-bridge at the narrows of the Hackensack River. This wooden span was called New Bridge to distinguish it from an older crossing 1 1/2 miles upstream at Old Bridge. In 1752, Jan Zabriskie, a descendant of Albrycht Zaborowski (Albert Zabriskie), a Polish immigrant from Angerburg (Węgorzewo) in Ducal Prussia, who had settled in New Jersey in 1662, built the oldest part of the Steuben House. The Zabriskies grew wealthy from increased trade brought on by the French and Indian War (1756-1763).

New Bridge Landing was the business center of the upper Hackensack Valley. Iron made in stone furnaces along the Ramapo Mountains was carried in ox-carts there, where it was loaded onto boats for shipment to market. Flour and animal feed was shipped from the mill. Diverse wares came in from boats returning from the city.

Because of the wide Hackensack Meadowlands downstream, New Bridge remained the nearest river crossing to Newark Bay until 1790, keeping it prosperous. Overland traffic including farm wagons and stage coaches, going to and from New York City, crossed the river at this spot on their way into the interior parts of the country.

== The Great Retreat ==
After losses in the Battle of Brooklyn, General George Washington led his troops towards Manhattan, with the British in pursuit. On November 16, 1776, Fort Washington in Upper Manhattan fell to the British, and Washington evacuated Fort Lee on the other side the North River (Hudson River).

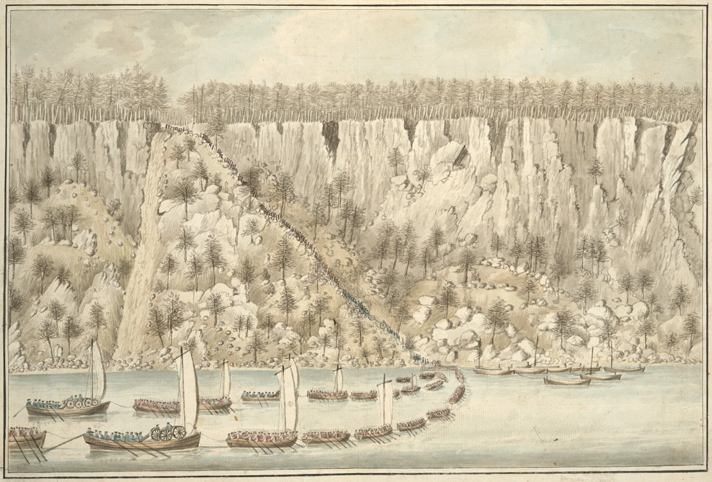
Depiction of the British invasion at the Palisades on the morning of November 20, 1776, near Fort Lee, New Jersey

In the early morning hours of November 20, 1776, Lieutenant General Charles Cornwallis led a British and Hessian army of about 5,000 soldiers across the Hudson to New Dock into New Jersey for an attack against Fort Lee, then defended by about 2,500-3,000 soldiers. Washington met Greene in the vicinity of the Liberty Pole in Englewood to lead his troops in a retreat through present-day Fort Lee, Englewood, and Teaneck across the Hackensack River at New Bridge. The hasty withdrawal of the American garrison across the Hackensack River at New Bridge preserved them from entrapment on the Bergen Neck, the narrow piece of land between the Hudson and Hackensack Rivers. They continued westward, crossing the Passaic River on the Acquakanonk Bridge, which was dismantled to slow the British.

A map published by the Bergen County Historical Society shows how close Washington came to being entrapped. He continued his retreat through early December, passing through Princeton and Trenton on the way towards and across the Delaware River into Pennsylvania.

According to tradition, Thomas Paine composed the first tract of The American Crisis - a series of essays intended to rally American resolve during the darkest hours of the war - at Newark using a drumhead for a desk and a campfire for light. Published on December 19, 1776, only six days before Washington's victory at Trenton reversed the declining fortunes of the Continental cause, Paine's stirred Continental hopes.

Regarding New Bridge he wrote:

Such was our situation and condition at Fort Lee on the morning of November 20, when an officer arrived with information that the enemy with 200 boats had landed about seven miles above. Major General Green, who commanded the garrison, immediately ordered them under arms, and sent express to General Washington at the town of Hackensack, distant by way of the ferry six miles.

Our first object was to secure the bridge over the Hackensack, which laid up the river between the enemy and us, about six miles from us, and three from them. General Washington arrived in about three quarters of an hour, and marched at the head of the troops towards the bridge, which place I expected we should have a brush for; however, they did not choose to dispute it with us, and the greatest part of our troops went over the bridge, the rest over the ferry, except some which passed at a mill on a small creek, between the bridge and the ferry, and made their way through some marshy grounds up to the town of Hackensack, and there passed the river. We brought off as much baggage as the wagons could contain, the rest was lost. The simple object was to bring off the garrison and march them on till they could be strengthened by the Jersey and Pennsylvania militia, so as to be enabled to make a stand. We staid four days at Newark, collected our outposts with some of the Jersey militia, and marched out twice to meet the enemy, on being informed that they were advancing, though our numbers were greatly inferior to theirs.

The British failure to capture the American garrison at Fort Lee, and perhaps defeat the American rebellion, was a consequence of self-confident British officers not realizing, despite reminders from local Loyalists, that "New Bridge was the key to the peninsula between the Hackensack and the Hudson."

While a constant arena for conflict, the following significant Revolutionary War events are associated with New Bridge:

- British troops under Major General Vaughan attacked the American rear guard on November 21, 1776, and seized the New Bridge, which American engineers were dismantling.
- British and Loyalist troops under command of Captain Patrick Fergusen attacked about 40 Bergen militiamen at New Bridge on May 18, 1779.
- Major Henry Lee led American troops from New Bridge on August 18, 1779, to attack the British earthworks at Paulus Hook.
- A force of Bergen Militia and Continental troops attacked 600 British troops and German auxiliaries at New Bridge on their retreat from Hackensack and Paramus on March 23, 1780, during the two hours it took for the British to repair and cross the New Bridge.
- A body of 312 British, Loyalist and German infantry, attacked and overwhelmed an American outpost at New Bridge commanded by Lieutenant Bryson on April 15, 1780.
- Eight British soldiers were killed and several wounded, by friendly fire when British troops attempted to attack a body of Bergen Militia in the Zabriskie-Steuben House at New Bridge on May 30, 1780.
- Brigadier General Anthony Wayne led American troops from New Bridge on a raid against the blockhouse at Bull's Ferry on July 20, 1780.
- General Washington made his headquarters in the Zabriskie-Steuben House during the Steenrapie encampment of the Continental Army, encompassing nearly 14,000 men, on September 4–20, 1780.

== Historic homes ==
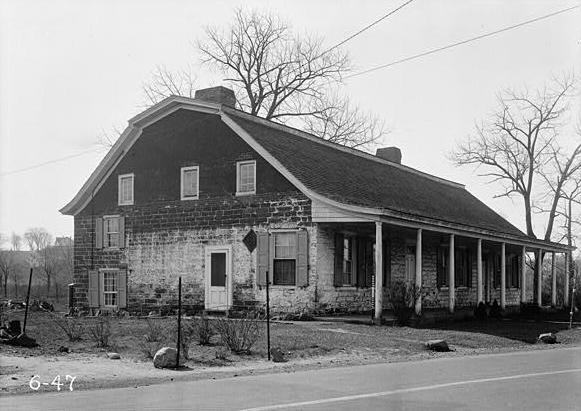
The Steuben House pictured in 1936

On December 23, 1783, in gratitude for his service to the Continental Army, the State of New Jersey presented use of a house, mill and the surrounding areas to Major-General Friedrich Wilhelm von Steuben. The house had been confiscated from Jan Zabriskie, a Loyalist, in 1781. This gift was one of many grants of land von Steuben received from several states in thanks for his efforts in training the Continental Army. This estate is considered to be the most valuable and is now known as the Steuben House.

The Steuben House Commission was created in 1926 to purchase Baron Steuben's home at New Bridge. The State of New Jersey took possession of the historic mansion and 1-acre (4,000 m^{2}) of ground for $9,000 on June 27, 1928. The Steuben House was renovated and opened as a public museum in September 1939, displaying period artifacts belonging to the Bergen County Historical Society. The Society was invited to make its headquarters at the Steuben House at that time. The Steuben House is a state-historic site, listed on the New Jersey and National Register of Historic Places and under the jurisdiction of the Historic New Bridge Landing Park Commission.

The Commission was established by legislation (P. L. 1995, Chapter 260, powers expanded by P. L. 2009, Chapter 45) to coordinate and implement governmental and private development policies and other activities incidental to the preservation, maintenance, restoration and interpretation of the historic riverfront village surrounding New Bridge, so as to optimize its educational and recreational benefit to the public.

Since the historic New Bridge neighborhood spans the Hackensack River at the intersection of the municipalities of River Edge, New Milford, Teaneck, and Hackensack, the Commission provides an forum for coordinating decisions made by the various public and private entities owning properties within its jurisdiction. The non-profit, volunteer Bergen County Historical Society is a lead force of the commission, being its largest landowner and providing volunteers for all programming.

The Steuben house is the cornerstone of a historic site. Other threatened historic homes, including the Campbell-Christie House and the Demarest House Museum moved from New Milford, and the Westervelt-Thomas Barn, from Washington Township, have been relocated onto BCHS property for preservation. BCHS constructed a working out-kitchen at the Steuben house.

The April 2007 Nor'easter caused damage to the Steuben home and the historic artifacts housed there.

== New Bridge Landing station ==
The New Bridge Landing station on the New Jersey Transit Pascack Valley Line, formerly named North Hackensack, was renamed in 2008 to honor the site and return the historical name to the area.

== See also ==
- New Jersey during the American Revolution
- Fort Lee Historic Park
- English Neighborhood
- Burdett's Landing
- National Register of Historic Places listings in Bergen County, New Jersey
- Raritan Landing, New Jersey
- List of crossings of the Hackensack River

== Bibliography ==
- Wright, Kevin W. (2019). The Bridge That Saved a Nation: Bergen County, New Bridge and the Hackensack Valley. Illustrated by Deborah Powell. America Through Time. ISBN 978-1-63499-165-0.
