= Demarest House (River Edge, New Jersey) =

Historic house in New Jersey, United States

- U.S. National Register of Historic Places
- U.S. Historic district – Contributing property
- New Jersey Register of Historic Places
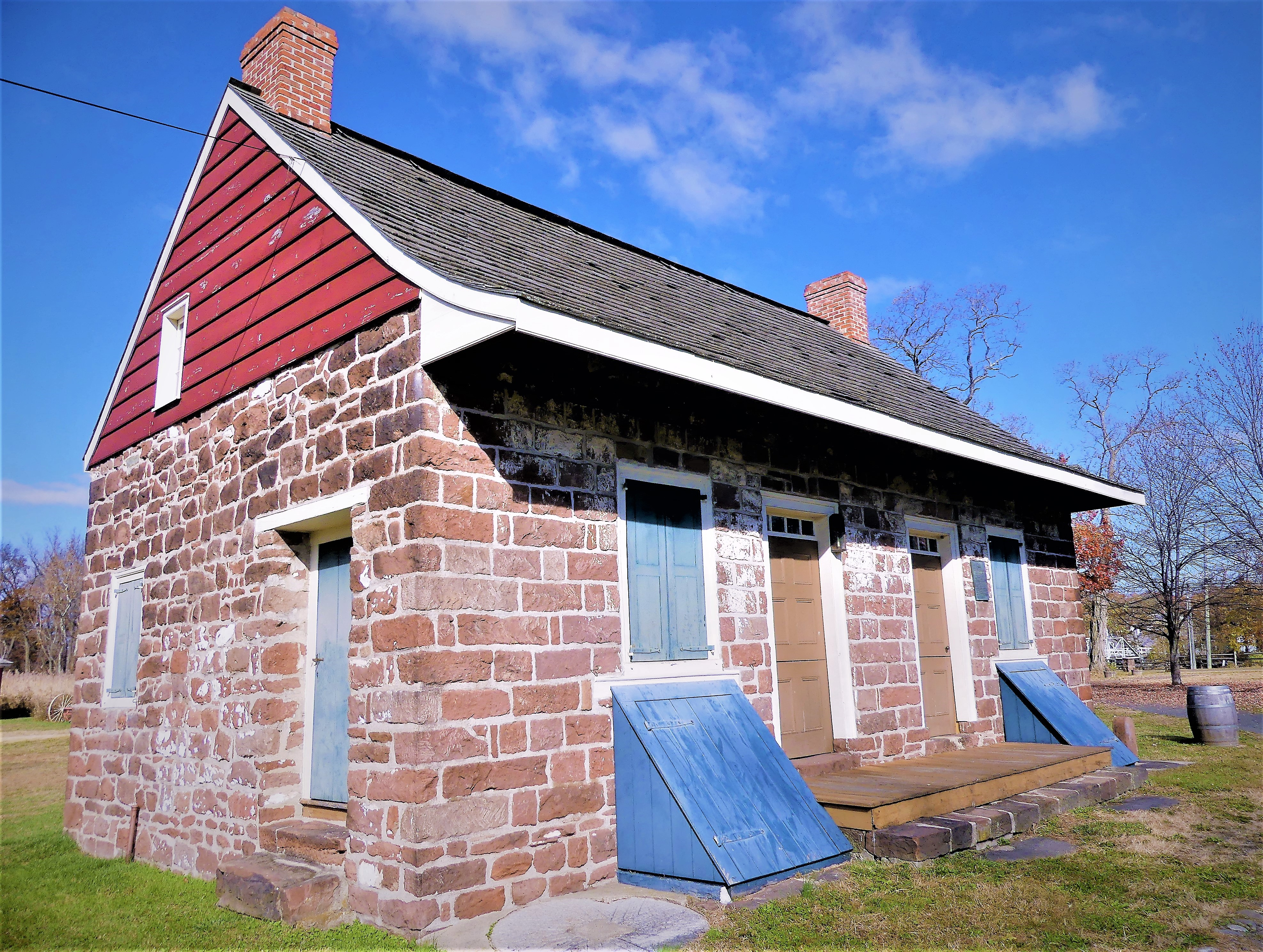
- Demarest House Museum in 2020

- Location within Bergen County, New Jersey Location within New Jersey Location within the United States
- Location: Main Street, River Edge, New Jersey
- Coordinates: 40.9131°N 74.0311°W
- Area: 3.9 acres (1.6 ha)
- Part of: Steuben Estate Complex (ID80004403)
- MPS: Early Stone Houses of Bergen County
- NRHP reference No.: 83001492
- NJRHP No.: 654

Significant dates
- Added to NRHP: January 10, 1983
- Designated CP: December 9, 1980
- Designated NJRHP: October 3, 1980

The Demarest House, now known as the Demarest House Museum, is located at New Bridge Landing in the borough of River Edge in Bergen County, New Jersey, United States. It was documented as the Samuel des Marest House by the Historic American Buildings Survey (HABS) in 1936. The house was originally thought to have been built by David des Marest (Demarest) for his son Samuel around 1679. The historic stone house was added to the National Register of Historic Places on January 10, 1983, for its significance in architecture. It was listed as part of the Early Stone Houses of Bergen County Multiple Property Submission (MPS).

== History ==
The house is a two-room sandstone cottage that was built around 1794 for miller John Paulison at the time of his marriage to Altie Ely. The stove chimney in the east room is a technological advance over fireplaces. The house was moved from its original site by the French Burial Ground in New Milford in 1955–1956 to River Edge, about one mile southwest. It is owned by the Blauvelt–Demarest Foundation, which restored the house in 2009.

The Demarest House Museum, the Campbell-Christie House and the Thomas-Westervelt Barn are on the Bergen County Historical Society's property at New Bridge Landing. The Steuben House is a state-historic site on one acre at New Bridge Landing.

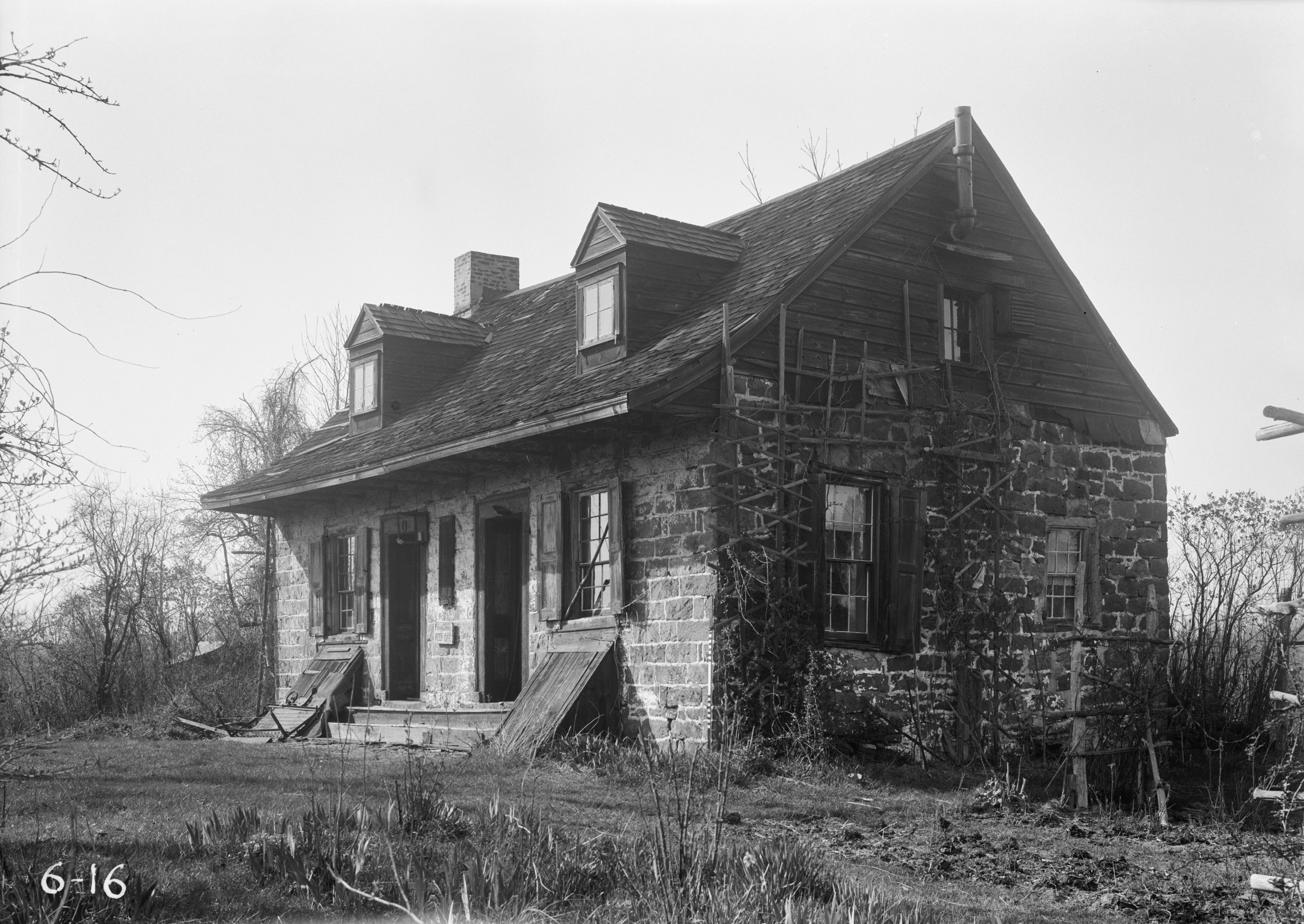
HABS image from 1936

== See also ==
- National Register of Historic Places listings in Bergen County, New Jersey
