= J. Walter Christie =

American racing driver, engineer and inventor (1865–1944)

John Walter Christie
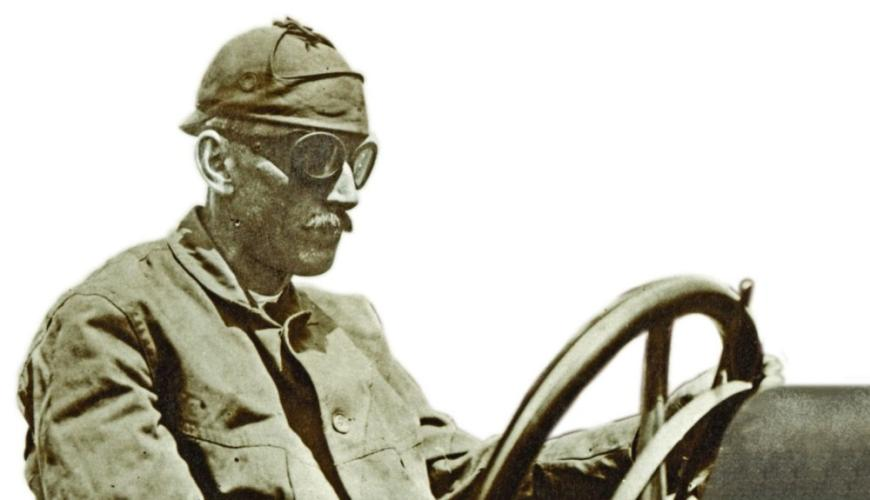
- John Walter Christie, circa 1914
- Born: May 6, 1865; Campbell-Christie House, New Milford, New Jersey, US
- Died: January 11, 1944 (aged 78); Falls Church, Virginia, US
- Known for: Christie suspension, front wheel drive, BT Tank
- Spouse: Jeannette Bennington
- Children: 1

John Walter Christie (May 6, 1865 – January 11, 1944) was an American engineer and inventor. He is known best for developing the Christie suspension system used in several World War II-era tank designs, most notably the Soviet BT and T-34 tanks series, and the United Kingdom Crusader cruiser tanks, as well as the Comet heavy cruiser tank.

== Early life and career ==
Christie was born to Jacob Brinkerhoff Christie and Elizabeth Van Houten Christie in New Milford, New Jersey, in the Campbell-Christie House, on May 6, 1865. He started working at the age of sixteen at the Delamater Iron Works while attending classes at the Cooper Union in New York City. He eventually became a consulting engineer for several steamship companies and during his spare time did some work on early submarine designs. After the Spanish–American War he developed and patented an improved turret track for naval artillery.

At about the same time, he was working on designs for a front-wheel-drive car, which he promoted and demonstrated by racing at various speedways in the United States, including the Readville Race Track and the 1905 Vanderbilt Cup race. His car was knocked out of a race by a collision with Vincenzo Lancia who was at the time leading the race in a Fiat. Lancia was enraged, but presumably noticed the Christie car's vertical-pillar coil-based independent front suspension: the then unusual configuration was used subsequently for the Lancia Lambda.

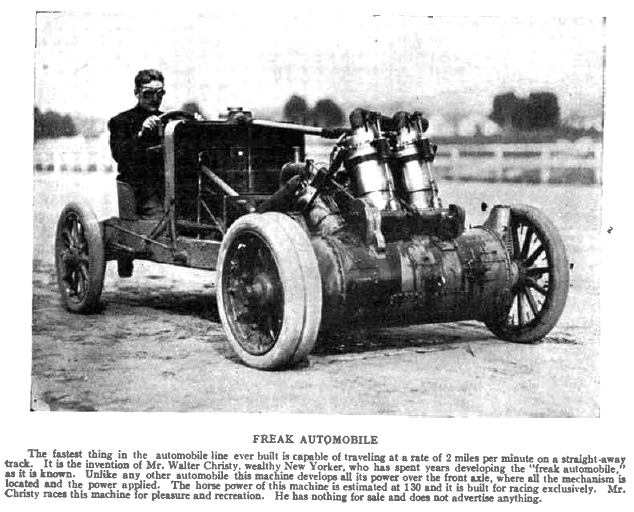
Christie's 1908 automobile

He was the first American to compete in the 1907 French Grand Prix: the V4 engine of 19,891 cc that powered his vehicle was the largest ever used in a Grand Prix race, but the car was retired after four laps with "engine trouble". On September 9 of that same year, Christie was seriously injured by a crash when his car struck loose debris during a lap at Brunots Island Race Track in Pittsburgh, Pennsylvania. In a twelve-car endurance race earlier that day, scheduled to run 50 miles, the Haynes car of driver Rex Reinertson had lost its right front tire with disastrous results, catapulting into the air and landing on its roof. Reinertson was crushed beneath the car, suffering injuries (including a skull fracture) that proved ultimately fatal, and his mechanic Clarence Bastion was ejected from the vehicle and thrown 50 feet (15 m) through the air, breaking both of his arms and both of his legs. After ten more laps, the race was stopped so that the injured racers could receive medical treatment, and Reinertson's car was cleared off the track. Next was Christie, driving the car he had used at the Grand Prix only a few months before. He was attempting to exceed the track's lap record of 58 seconds, and due to receive a $500 prize if he was successful. Christie completed the second half of his warmup lap in only 24 seconds, so he was well on pace for a new record, but at the 1/8 mile marker of his real lap his right front wheel struck part of Reinertson's car that remained on the track. Christie was thrown from the car, traveling twenty feet in the air and fifty feet across the ground, before coming to earth. Mark Baldwin, a former Major League Baseball player who became a doctor after his retirement from professional sports, happened to be in the stands as a spectator, and he ran to Christie and administered first aid until Christie could be placed in an ambulance and taken to a hospital, a task that was complicated by the large number of spectators who had climbed down from the grandstands and moved onto the track. Christie had been knocked unconscious by the impact. He also sustained a broken left wrist, a cut on his right eye from the broken glass of his goggles, and a significant injury to his back. Doctors who treated Christie expressed concern that he might be crippled as a result of his injuries, or lose the sight of his damaged eye, and news of his accident was kept from his wife, who was herself seriously ill at their home in River Edge, New Jersey. Christie remained in the St. John's Hospital until September 19, at which time he was discharged and returned to New York. Walter Christie built the 1909 front wheel drive Christie Racer driven by Barney Oldfield, Master Driver of the World and America's Legendary Speed King, the first to lap the Indianapolis Speedway at more than 100 MPH. on May 28, 1916, speed: 102.623 MPH, time: 1.27.70.

Christie now switched his efforts from automobile racing to developing his front wheel drive New York taxicab design. With benefit of hindsight, the taxi design's importance came in large part from the fact that it incorporated a transversely mounted engine/transmission assembly, applying a basic architecture that would be greeted as revolutionary when applied by Alec Issigonis in the British Motors car BMC Mini fifty years later. However, in 1909 designs were less standardized than they would become by 1959, and for Christie the vehicle's more striking novelty was that the entire "forecarriage", incorporating all the major mechanical components, could be detached and replaced in "less than one hour". The car's radical design was to necessitate the manufacture of many complex components in-house, and problems encountered subsequently by other manufacturers, such as Cord L-29, producing or finding a dependable universal joint make it likely that the Christie design was difficult to maintain. Due to design limitations and a published unit price in 1909 of $2,600, sales of Christie taxis were poor.

In 1912 Christie began manufacturing wheeled fire engine tractors which also utilized a front-wheel-drive system, and subsequently sold scores of them to fire departments around the country, most notably the New York City Fire Department. The tractors allowed the departments to keep their steam-powered pumps while ending the use of horses to pull them to the scene of a fire.

In 1916, during the First World War, he developed a prototype four-wheeled gun carriage for the US Army Ordnance Board. But the Ordnance board had specified strict guidelines for weapons, and Christie refused to revise his designs to suit their requirements. Christie's stubbornness and his tendency to offend the US Army bureaucracy would have consequences for the rest of his career.

== Amphibious tank ==
Christie's first important sympathizer was not with the Army, but with the United States Marine Corps: Major General Eli K. Cole, who was an advocate of developing the amphibious capability of the Marine Corps. Christie had built an amphibious light tank a decade before Donald Roebling's Alligator, and this was to be displayed during the military's Winter Maneuvers of 1924 at Culebra, Puerto Rico. In overall command of the exercise was Admiral Robert Coontz, USN. Along with testing the "Beetle Boat", a copy of the armoured lighter barges used as landing craft by the British during the Gallipoli landings in 1915, Christie presented his amphibious tank, first recommended by Brigadier General Smedley Butler. The tank was transported to the exercise area aboard the USS Wyoming (BB-32), and designated as "Marine Corps Tank (GC-2)". It was then hoisted aboard a waiting submarine prior to its launch toward the shore, then "As the "mother ship" submerged, the Christie tank proceeded to shore. Unable to maneuver through the heavy surf, the vehicle returned to the Wyoming without landing. The next day, when the surf had subsided, the Christie amphibian once again left its mooring aboard the submarine and made a perfect landing. Despite the fact that the vehicle came ashore after the exercise had been declared officially finished, Cole stated that the tank possessed the capability of being developed into an extremely valuable weapon, especially in association with landing operations."

== Later innovations and bureaucratic frustrations ==
Christie continued to submit designs to the Ordnance board, but none was deemed acceptable. A major reason was poor cross-country performance, due to limited suspension capabilities. He attended to this problem, and after five years of development (for $382,000) he produced the innovative prototype tank chassis M1928 (Model 1928) design. He proudly referred to it informally as the "Model 1940" because he considered it to be 12 years ahead of its time. The M1928 still retained large road wheels with no return rollers for the tracks from his earlier designs, so that the tracks could be removed for road travel, allowing for greater speed and range. What made this prototype innovative was its new "helicoil" suspension system, whereby each wheel had its own spring-loaded assembly. This reduced space in the interior of the tank, but (combined with a very light overall weight) allowed for unprecedented high-speed cross-country mobility, albeit at the cost of extremely thin armor. Another feature of the M1928 and later Christie designs was sloped armor in front, which could better deflect projectiles. The sloped armor helped to compensate for its thinness. The Army purchased several of Christie's tank prototypes for testing purposes and Christie's patent, allowing them to produce prototypes based on his design.

In October 1928, the M1928 was demonstrated at Fort Myer, Virginia. There the Army's Chief of Staff, General Charles P. Summerall, and other high-ranking officers were impressed and strongly recommended that the Infantry Tank Board conduct further, official tests of the new vehicle. However, the Tank Board was less enthusiastic. They noted that the vehicle's armor was very thin and could not survive penetration by the smallest armor-piercing antitank rifle or artillery piece. The Board also differed with Christie on its guidelines for tank capabilities, which were based on a radically different theory of armored warfare than that used by Christie. While Christie advocated the use of lightweight tanks with long range and high speed, designed to penetrate enemy lines and attack their infrastructure and logistics capabilities, they considered the tank as simply an auxiliary weapon to help protect the infantry, and to help isolate and reduce enemy strongpoints near the front lines, much as they had been used during the previous world war. For the Infantry Tank Board, armor and firepower were more important design criteria than mobility, and the M1928 prototype was passed to the Cavalry for further evaluation.

The Cavalry's thinking at that time was based on armored cars, and it wanted to develop the M1928 as an armored car chassis. Once again, Christie's concept of how his vehicles should be used, together with his difficult nature, resulted in disputes with Army officials. One member of the Cavalry Evaluation Board who appreciated both Christie's design and tank warfare concepts was Lt. Colonel George S. Patton. Patton, and his friend Major Clarence C. Benson, strongly endorsed the adoption of the M1928 as the basis for a Cavalry tank.

Ultimately, the Secretary of War rejected mass production of the M1928, citing excessive acquisition costs. Christie then felt he was justified in selling his inventions to the highest bidder. He began discussing his advanced chassis and suspension systems with foreign governments; Poland, the USSR and the United Kingdom had all expressed interest in the designs. A long and complex series of exchanges between Christie and foreign governments followed. These were technically illegal since Christie never obtained approval of the US Department of State, Army Ordnance, or the Department of War to transfer his designs to potentially hostile governments.

== Dealings with foreign governments ==
Initially, Christie promised to sell his M1928 tank design to the Polish government. In 1929, Captain Marian Rucinski of the Polish Military Institute of Engineering Research (WIBI) was sent to the US, and soon learned of the M1928 tank being constructed by Christie's company, the US Wheel Track Layer Corporation in Linden, New Jersey. Rucinski also learned of a design for an improved tank (known later as the Christie M1931) that had recently been blueprinted. Rucinski's opinion was so enthusiastic that on February 16, 1930 a special acquisition commission was dispatched to the US, commanded by the Chief of the Engineering Department, Colonel Tadeusz Kossakowski. The commission signed a contract with Christie in March for construction and delivery of a single M1928 tank, and paid a pre-payment to him. Christie later failed to fulfill his contract obligations, and to avoid potential litigation, eventually returned the payment made by the Polish government, which never obtained the tank they had ordered.

Soviet agents were able to secure plans about Christie's tank by a relationship with an American Army officer. Though the USSR did not have diplomatic relations with the US at the time, and was prohibited from obtaining military equipment or weapons, Soviet OGPU agents at the trade front organization AMTORG managed to secure plans and specifications for the Christie M1928 tank chassis in 1930 using a series of deceptions. On April 28, 1930 Christie's company, the U.S. Wheel Track Layer Corporation, agreed to sell Amtorg two M1931 Christie-designed tanks at a total cost of $60,000 US, with the tanks to be delivered not later than four months from date of signing, together with spare parts for the tanks for the sum of $4,000. Rights were also transferred for the production, sale and use of tanks inside the borders of the U.S.S.R. for a period of ten years. The two Christie tanks, documented falsely as agricultural farm tractors, were sold without prior approval of the U.S. Army or Department of State, and were shipped without turrets to the USSR. The Soviets used these two tanks to develop the BT series of tanks, forerunners of the massively produced T-34 tank of World War II.

After favorable reports on observation of the Soviet activities, the British War Office arranged purchase of Christie's last remaining prototype and licensing of a Christie design through the Morris Motors Group. The deal was done by telephone for £8,000; however, the British discovered that Christie had already mortgaged the vehicle. Why payment necessary to secure the vehicle was not deducted from this figure is not known but the net cost increased to £10,420 18s 4d, which included British Customs Duty and 'other expenses'. The US authorities refused its export as it was war materiel. The vehicle was dismantled sufficiently to meet specification as an "agricultural tractor" and was so exported. The parts removed were then shipped to the UK in crates marked as "grapefruit". Christie's design still had a number of faults that he had never addressed and though the general features were retained, the design was completely reworked to form the British Cruiser Mk III (A13).

== Later life and work ==
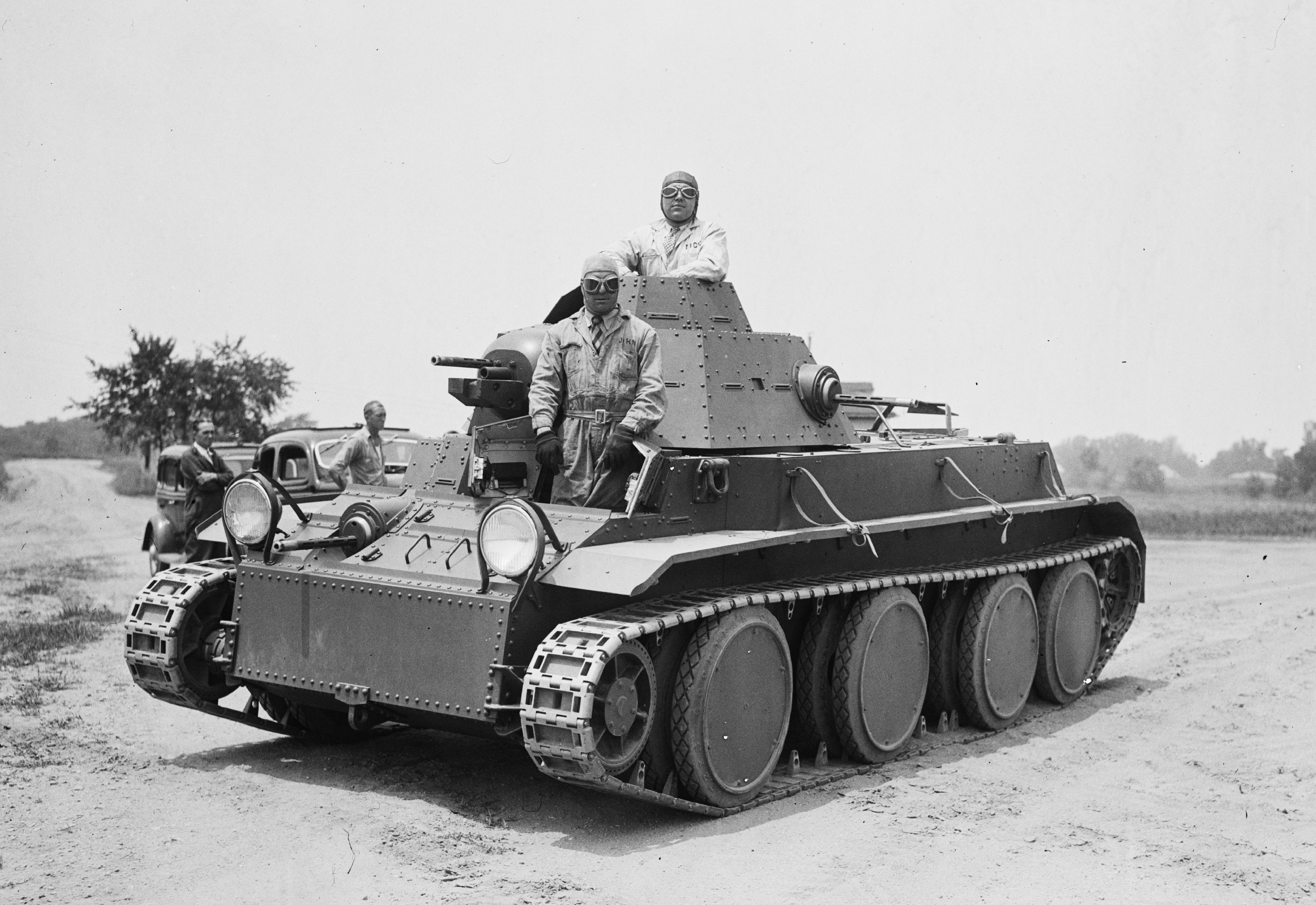
Experimental Christie T3E2 tank, shown here during tests in 1936

After the U.S. Army's rejection of the M1928, Christie continued to work on new designs throughout the 1930s, including a winged tank. Though the Army purchased several prototypes and developed its own experimental designs based on Christie designs, none of the Christie designs was ever mass produced by the US.

After the beginning of World War II in 1939 and the US commencement of hostilities in 1941, Christie again submitted tank designs to the army, all of which featured his suspension system and large, convertible road wheels. But as with his earlier dealings with the army, attempts to secure US government adoption ended largely in frustration and rejection.

Christie died in Falls Church, Virginia on January 11, 1944.

== See also ==
- History of Soviet espionage in the United States
