= Campbell-Christie House =

Historic house in New Jersey, US

- U.S. National Register of Historic Places
- U.S. Historic district – Contributing property
- New Jersey Register of Historic Places
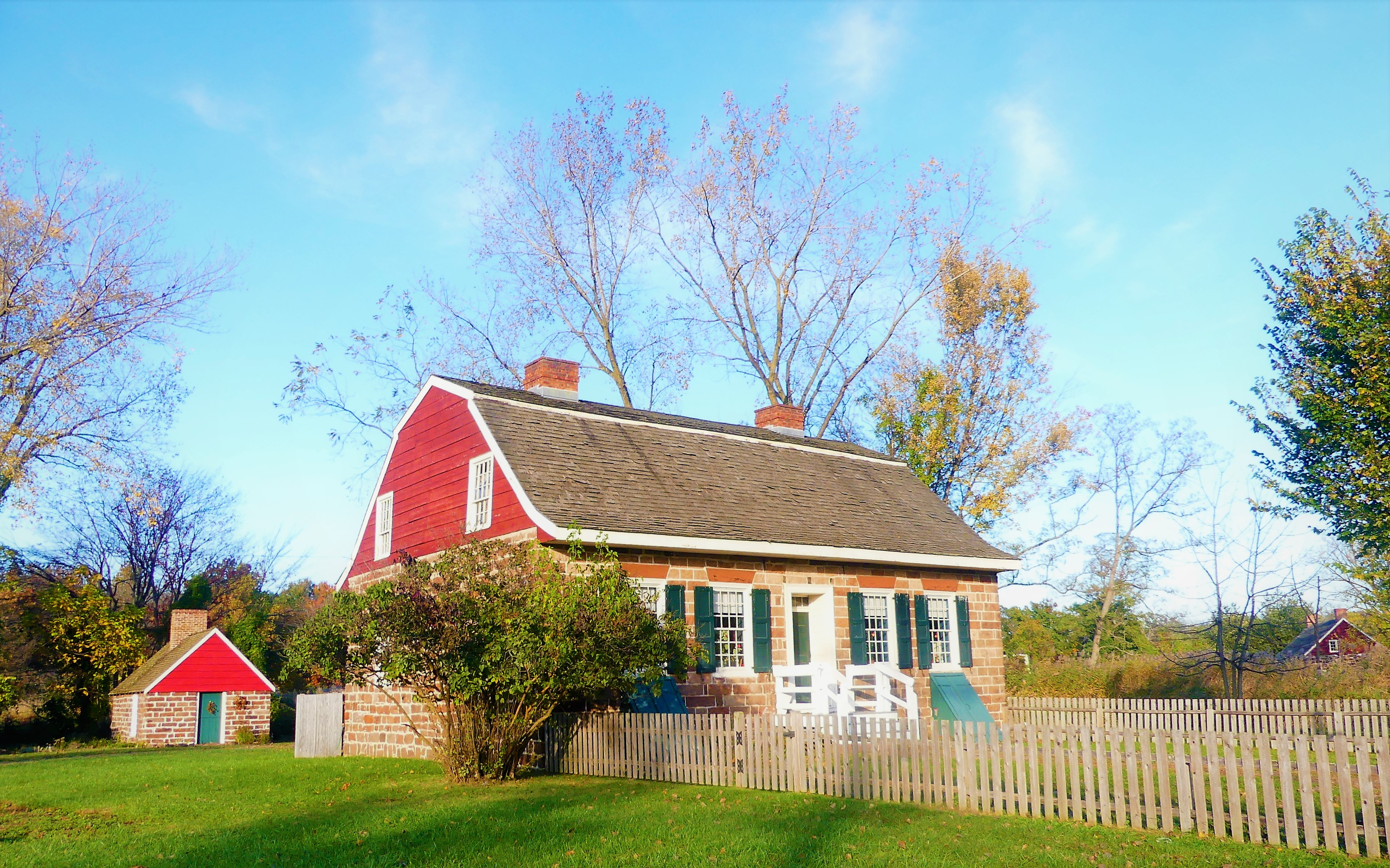
- Campbell-Christie House in 2021

- Location within Bergen County, New Jersey Location within New Jersey Location within the United States
- Location: 1201 Main Street; River Edge, New Jersey
- Coordinates: 40.9130°N 74.0322°W
- Built: c. 1774
- Part of: Steuben Estate Complex (ID80004403)
- MPS: Early Stone Houses of Bergen County
- NRHP reference No.: 83001481
- NJRHP No.: 652

Significant dates
- Added to NRHP: January 10, 1983
- Designated CP: December 9, 1980
- Designated NJRHP: October 3, 1980

The Campbell-Christie House is a historic home that has been relocated to New Bridge Landing in River Edge, Bergen County, New Jersey. It was added to the National Register of Historic Places on January 10, 1983, as part of the Early Stone Houses of Bergen County Multiple Property Submission (MPS).

== History ==
Jacob Campbell, a stonemason, constructed a store southeast of the intersection of River Road and the highway leading from Old Bridge to South Church, now Henley Avenue, in New Milford, New Jersey, about the time of his marriage to Altche Westervelt in 1774. It stood on land owned by his father, William Campbell, who kept a tavern on the north side of the road. Private Jacob Campbell served with the Bergen Militia during the American Revolution. His property was damaged during the war, but tax records for 1780 list him as a merchant. After his father's death in 1793, Jacob sold to Abraham Brower, whose brother, John, a blacksmith, operated a roadside smithy until his death a year later. Blacksmith John D. Christie purchased the house for £250 in 1795 and operated a tavern. When he died in 1836, he bequeathed his residence to son John J. Christie, a farmer. It next passed to Jacob Brinkerhoff Christie, manager of the Comfort Coal & Lumber Company.

J. Walter Christie, born here on May 6, 1865, achieved fame as a mechanical genius and inventor. At 16 years of age, he worked on pioneer submarines and developed turret tracks and gun mounts for battleships. He built and raced cars, holding American and world speed records before being severely injured in a crash in 1907. He later invented automotive front-wheel drive, used in the manufacture of fire trucks. but is best known as the “father of the modern tank.” He died at Falls Church, Virginia, in 1944.

The Brookchester Land Company made extensive alterations to the house in 1908. To save it from demolition, the Bergen County Historical Society, a non-profit volunteer organization, offered the County of Bergen a 50-year ground lease to move the Campbell-Christie House from New Milford onto its lands in River Edge in 1977 on condition that the Historical Society not only have occupancy of the structure in keeping with its mission, but also the exclusive right to determine its use and historic restoration; in exchange, the County of Bergen agreed to pay utilities and to maintain the house and its mechanical systems in sound condition. Bergen County Freeholder D. Bennett Mazur led efforts to save the Campbell-Christie House, after it had been slated for demolition. With a $150,000 grant, the 200-year-old home was moved two miles from New Milford to BCHS land in River Edge, the area now known as Historic New Bridge Landing, in September 1977.

The Bergen County Historical Society furnishes and interprets the Campbell-Christie House as an 18th-century tavern. In 1992, a working replica of a Jersey Dutch Out Kitchen was built behind the house. The Bergen County Historical Society regularly opens all the buildings, including the Campbell-Christie House, at Historic New Bridge Landing for special events in cooperation with the Historic New Bridge Landing Park Commission. The Bergen County Historical Society receives no public operating grants from any public agency (including the County of Bergen or the State of New Jersey), instead relying on membership and donations.

== See also ==
- National Register of Historic Places listings in Bergen County, New Jersey
- List of the oldest buildings in New Jersey
