= Fort Lee Historic Park =

Reconstructed historic site in Fort Lee, New Jersey, United States

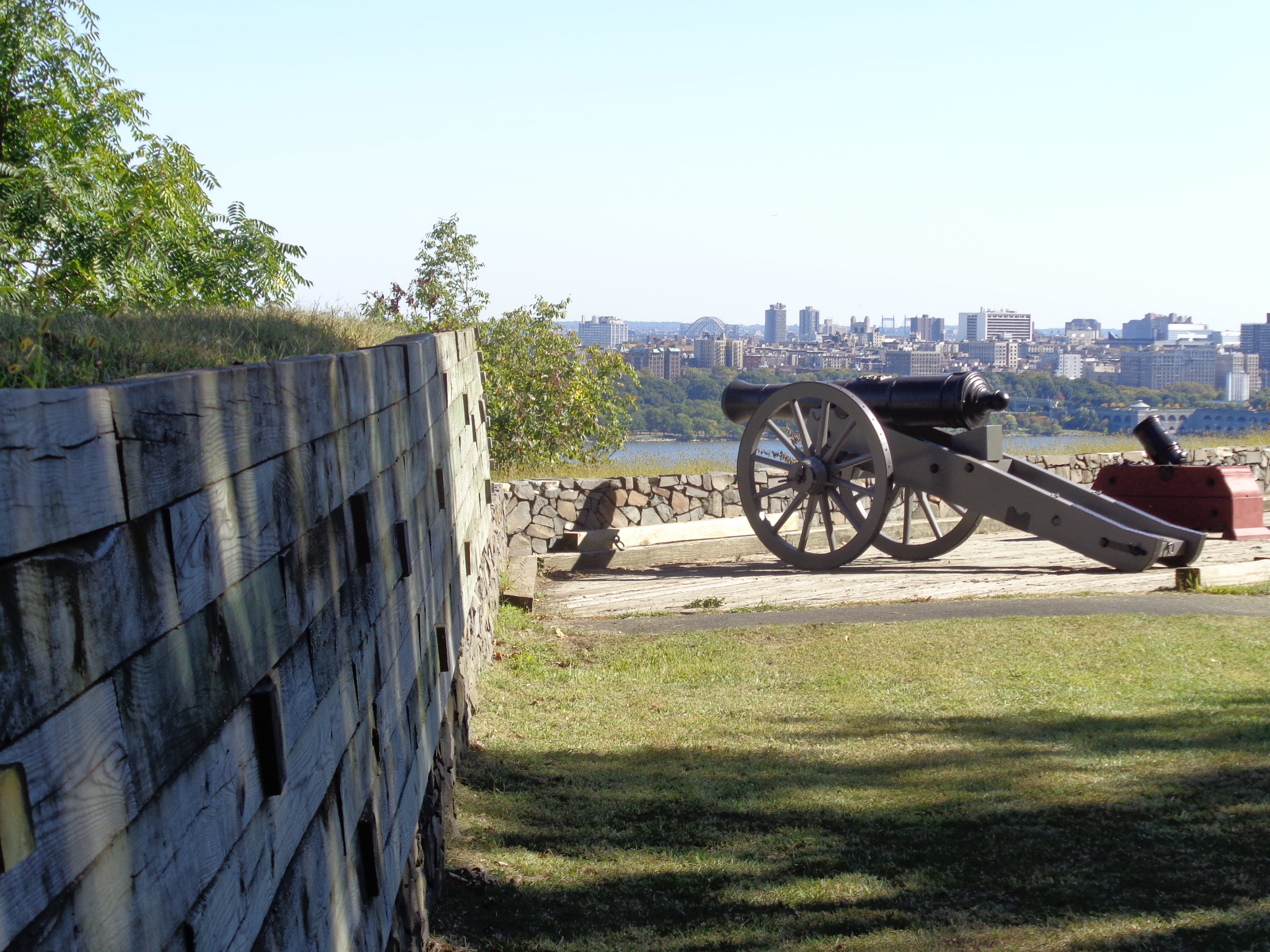

- Location within Bergen County, New Jersey
- Location: Fort Lee, New Jersey, United States
- Coordinates: 40°51′00″N 73°57′45″W
- Area: 33 acres (13 ha)

Fort Lee Historic Park is located atop a bluff of the Hudson Palisades overlooking Burdett's Landing, known as Mount Constitution, in Fort Lee, New Jersey, United States. The park was conceived as early as 1952.

Native Americans appear to have lived in the area for thousands of years before the arrival of Europeans. The bluff was the site of George Washington's 1776 encampment opposite Fort Washington at the northern end of Manhattan. Fort Lee is named for General Charles Lee. The site is a reconstruction of the encampment including the blockhouse, battery, quarters as well as a visitors center. It is part of the Palisades Interstate Park Commission.

At the north end of the park there are two overlooks with views of the George Washington Bridge, the Hudson River, and the skyline of Upper Manhattan. Fort Lee Historic Park marks the site of an important Revolutionary War encampment. It was a key defensive position used by the Continental Army in 1776 to protect the Hudson River from British forces.

== Fort Lee ==
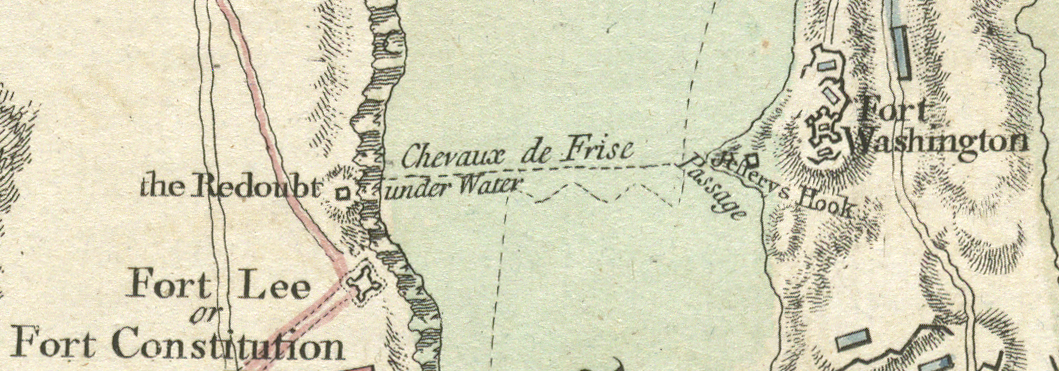
A 1777 map during the Revolutionary War detailing the chevaux-de-frise between Fort Lee and Fort Washington

Fort Lee, originally Fort Constitution, was a Revolutionary War-era fort located on the crest of the Hudson Palisades in what was then Hackensack Township, New Jersey opposite Fort Washington at the northern end of Manhattan Island.

=== Construction ===
George Washington, then commander of the Continental Army, issued orders to General Mercer to summon all available troops and erect a fort on the west side of the Hudson River. Construction commenced in July 1776 on the new fort, to be called Fort Constitution.

The fort was located on the western side of the road that led up the hill from the landing. Concurrently, Fort Washington was being built almost directly across the North River (Hudson River) in New York. Chevaux-de-frise, south of the Hudson River Chain, were laid between them.

=== Defense of the Hudson River ===
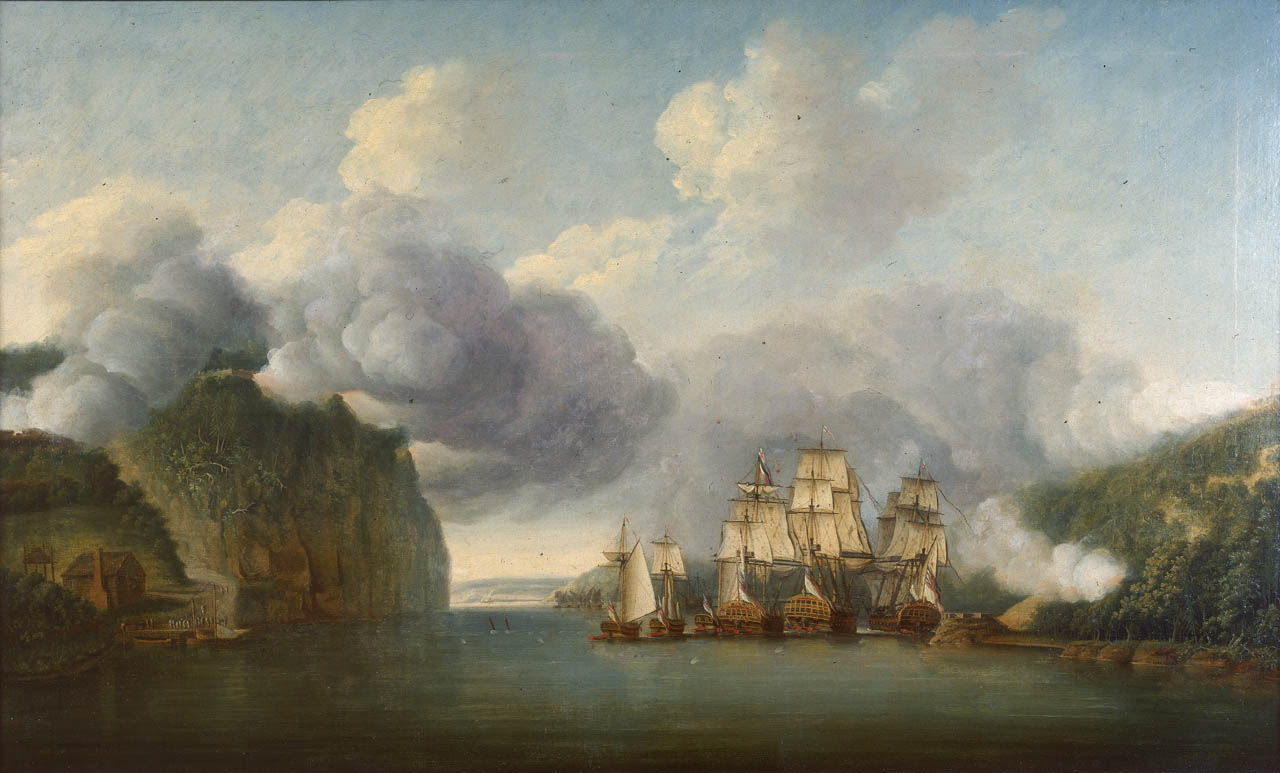
A portrait of British warships attempting to pass between Fort Lee and Fort Washington

These twin forts were intended to protect the lower Hudson from British warships. At first, efforts were concentrated close to the water level near Burdett's Landing. Later, fortifications were added atop the bluff under the supervision of Joseph Philips, Battalion Commander of the New Jersey State Militia. The Bourdette's ferry service was taken over by the Army, and Peter Bourdette was forced to vacate his house; although as a patriot he considered it no sacrifice and offered the work of his slaves to General Mercer's construction efforts.

At the end of September 1776, Fort Constitution was renamed Fort Lee, for General Charles Lee of the Continental Army. George Washington used the stone Bourdette house for his headquarters when he passed time at Fort Lee. At this stage of the war the ferry operated as a supply line and the only link between Forts Lee and Washington.

== Battle of Fort Lee ==
Battle of Fort Lee
- Part of the American Revolutionary War
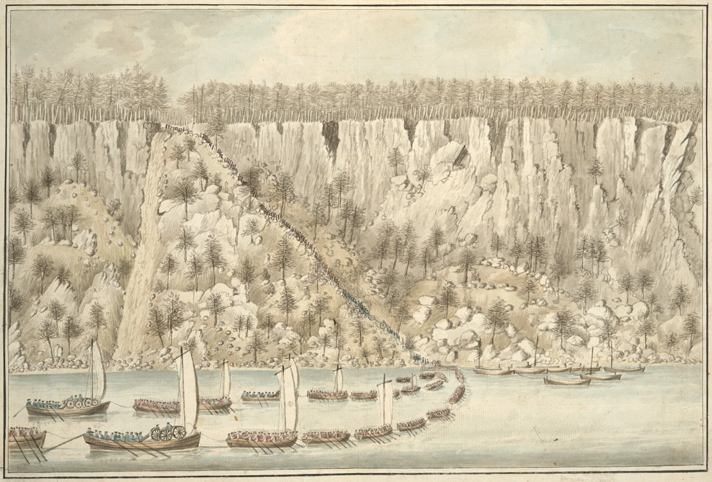
- Watercolor by Captain Thomas Davies depicting the British landing at the base of the Palisades
| Date | November 19, 1776 |
| Location | Fort Lee, New Jersey vicinity |
| Result | British victory |

Belligerents
| United States | Great Britain: Hesse-Kassel |

Commanders and leaders
| (United States) George Washington (United States) Nathanael Greene | (Kingdom of Great Britain) Charles Cornwallis (Hesse) Carl von Donop |

Strength
| 2,000 | 5,000; 8 guns |

The Battle of Fort Lee on November 19, 1776, marked the successful invasion of New Jersey by British and Hessian forces and the subsequent general retreat of the Continental Army during the American Revolutionary War.

=== Background ===
Peter Bourdette's sixteen-year-old son, also named Peter, provided assistance by direct use of the landing. During the week leading up to the evacuation of Fort Lee he rowed back and forth across the river gathering information for General Washington on the anticipated movements of the British forces. Well after dark on the night before the battle for New York at Fort Washington, George Washington was rowed from Burdett's Landing to the middle of the Hudson River for a strategy session with his senior officers in charge of New York, who rowed to meet him. On November 16, 1776, George Washington witnessed the battle for New York from across the river on the bluff of Fort Lee, above Burdett's Landing.

=== British invasion ===
Fort Lee was rendered defenseless after Continental Army troops holding Fort Washington were defeated and captured on November 16, 1776. The Royal Navy controlled the Hudson River. General William Howe ordered Charles Cornwallis to "clear the rebel troops from New Jersey without a major engagement, and to do it quickly before the weather changed."

The force included Hessian units commanded by Colonel Carl von Donop. The invasion of New Jersey began the night of November 19, when 5,000 British troops were ferried across the Hudson on barges. British military Commander Lord Cornwallis landed a force of between 2,500 and 5,000 at what was sometimes known as the "Lower Closter Landing", later known as Huyler’s Landing or "Huyler's", on November 20, 1776.

In an effort to ambush Washington and crush the rebellion in the wake of the rebels' defeat in the Battle of Brooklyn and the Battle of Fort Washington, Cornwallis marched his men up the cliffs of the Palisades via a rough path, and southward through the Northern Valley. The landing was long erroneously thought to have taken place at the Closter Landing in Alpine, then known as "Upper Closter Landing", and now the site of the Alpine Boat Basin and picnic area. The actual path used by the British later became a road used to bring farm goods from the Northern Valley to a dock at river level ("Huyler’s"), where there were also buildings until later in the 20th century. The Park trail follows the old farmers' road from the Shore Trail at the bottom to the top, where it connects with the Long Path.

George Washington and Nathanael Greene quickly ordered the evacuation of the fort on the morning of November 20, 1776.

=== American retreat ===
The soldiers then began a hasty retreat west, crossing the Hackensack River at New Bridge Landing and the Passaic River at Acquackanonk Bridge.

During Washington's retreat, which began along a road that is now Main Street, Thomas Paine authored and published his pamphlet, "The American Crisis", in Philadelphia, which began with the famed phrase, "These are the times that try men's souls".

== Fort Lee Museum and Monument Park ==
Fort Lee Museum is located in Monument Park. which was created by the Daughters of the American Revolution and dedicated in 1908 at ceremony attended by General John "Black Jack" Pershing. The park was part of the original Fort Constitution of the Continental Army under the leadership of General George Washington. Over 2,600 troops were stationed in and around the Monument Park area.

In 2004, the park was reconstructed for the Fort Lee Centennial Celebration. A time capsule was placed at the foot of the monument, to be opened at the Bicentennial Celebration in the year 2104. Monument Park and Continental Army Plaza in Williamsburg, Brooklyn are the only parks in the United States dedicated to the soldiers of the American Revolution.

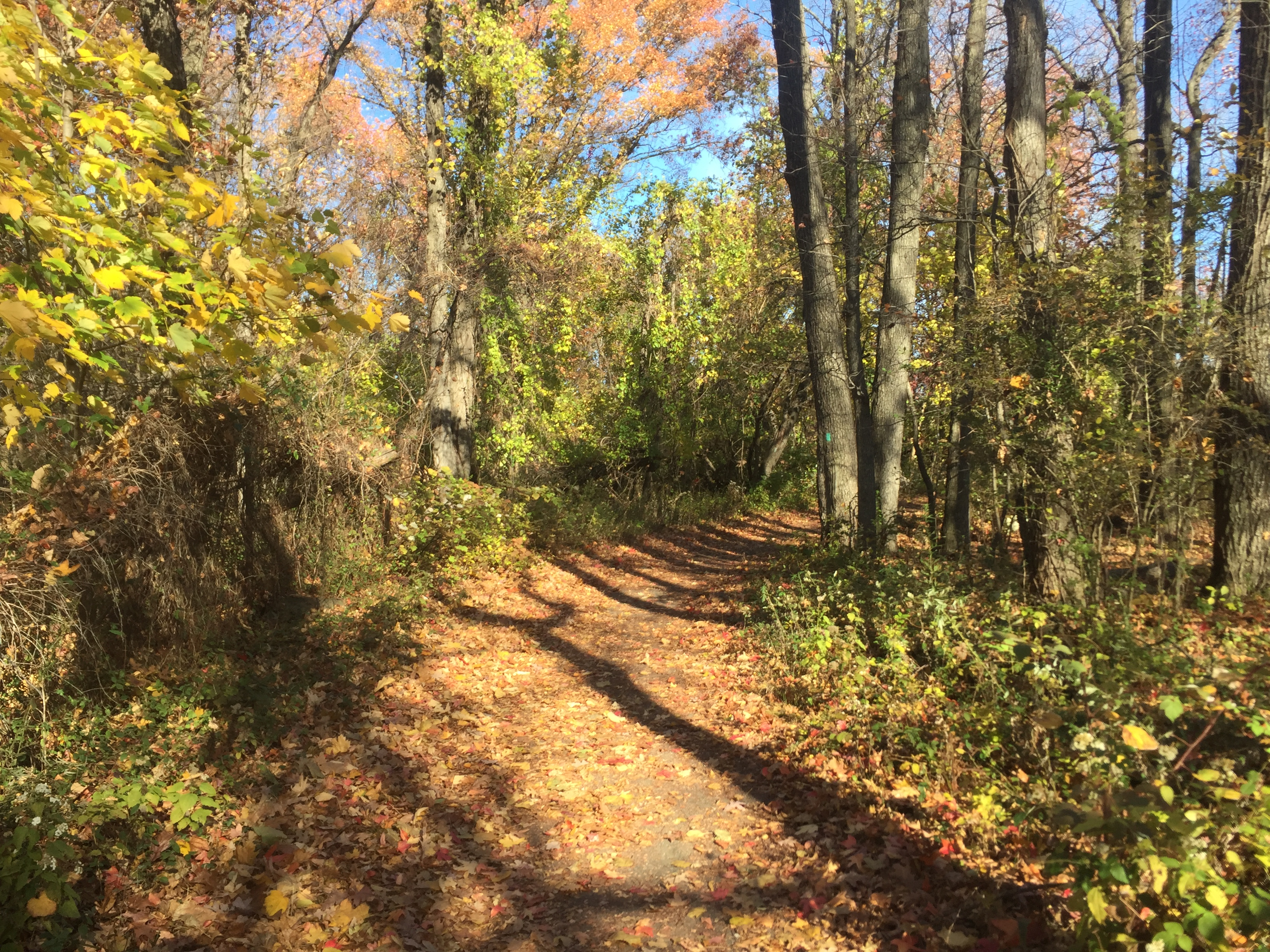
Hiking path

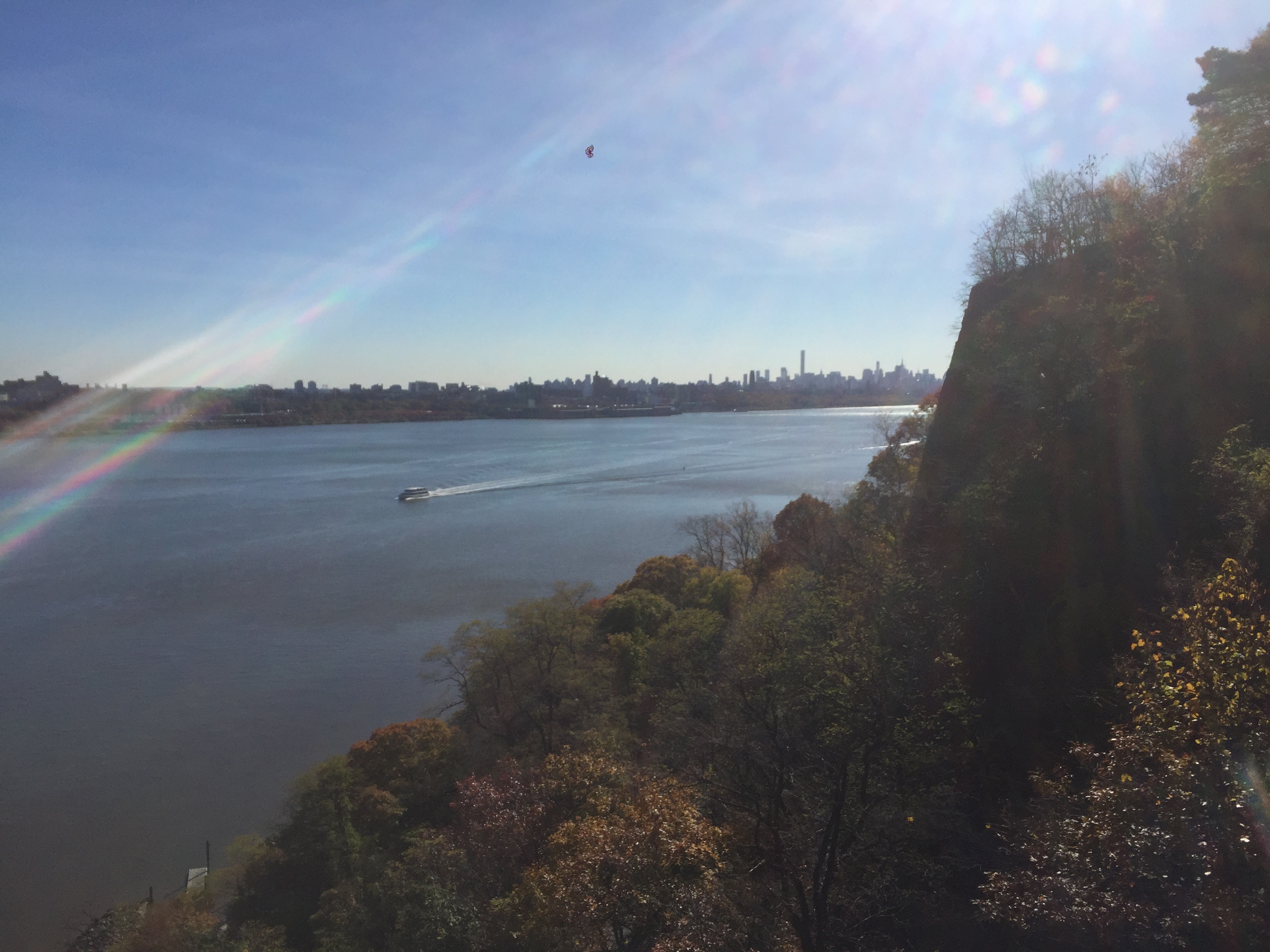
View of Manhattan

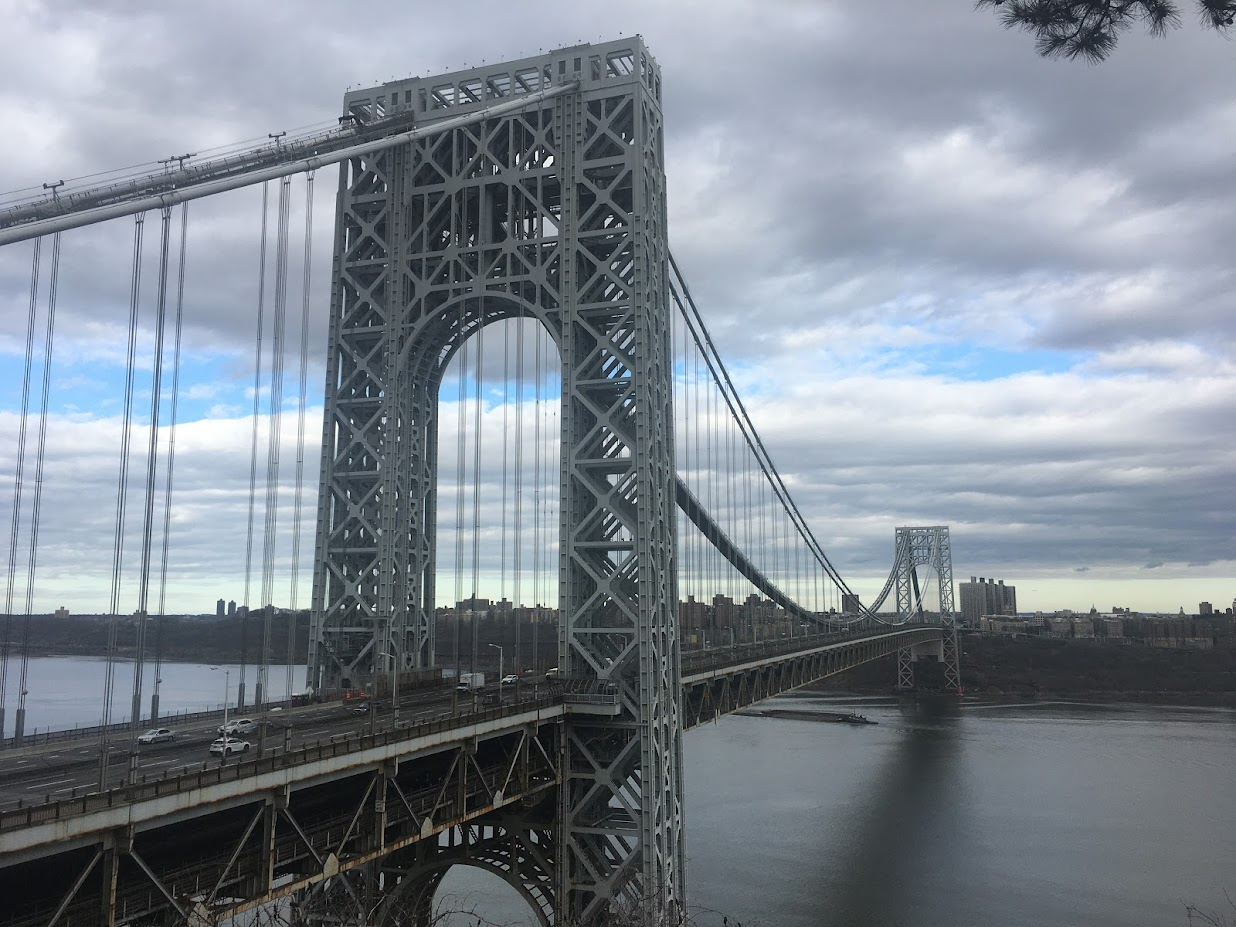
View of the George Washington Bridge

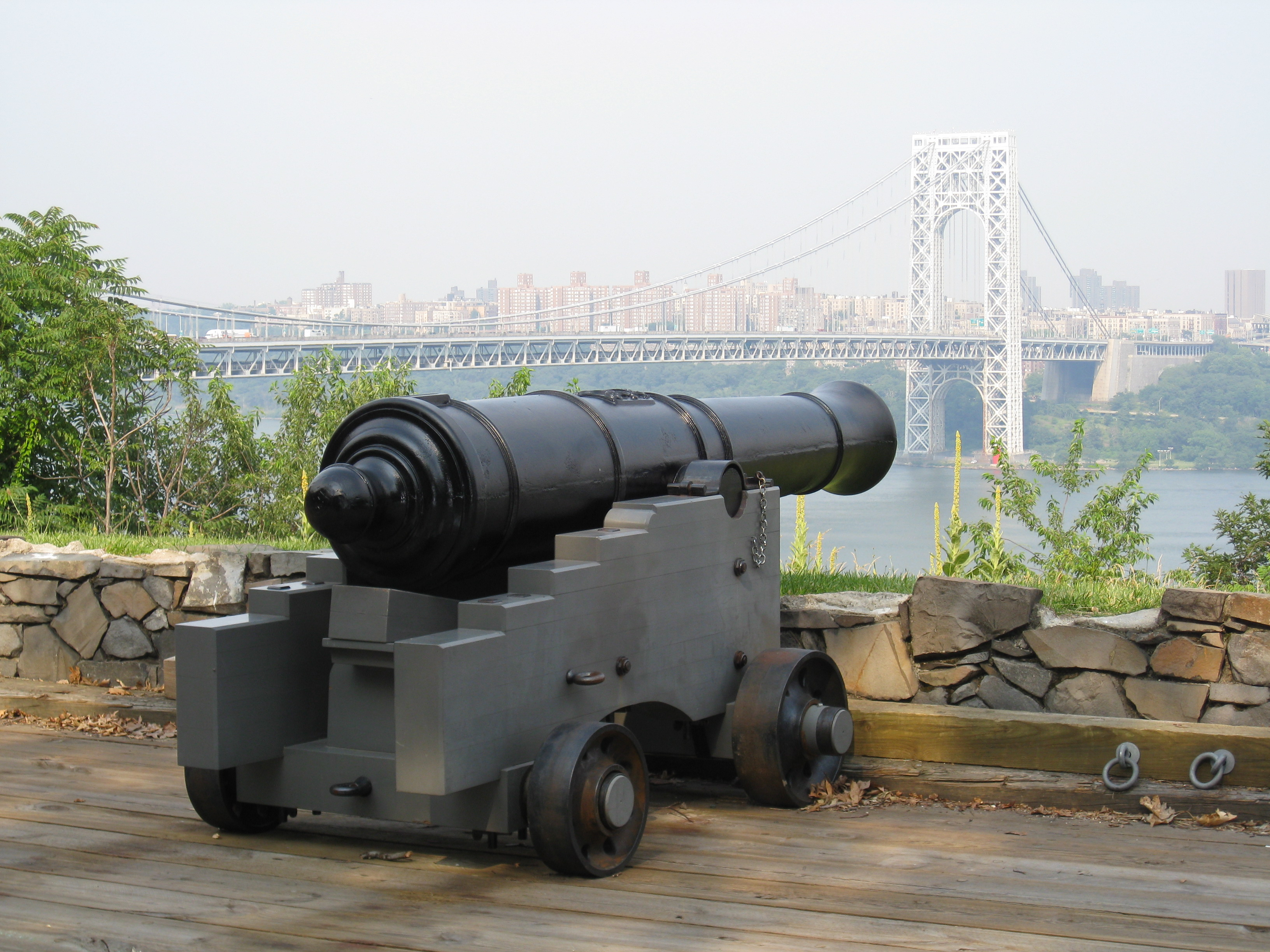
Historic cannon

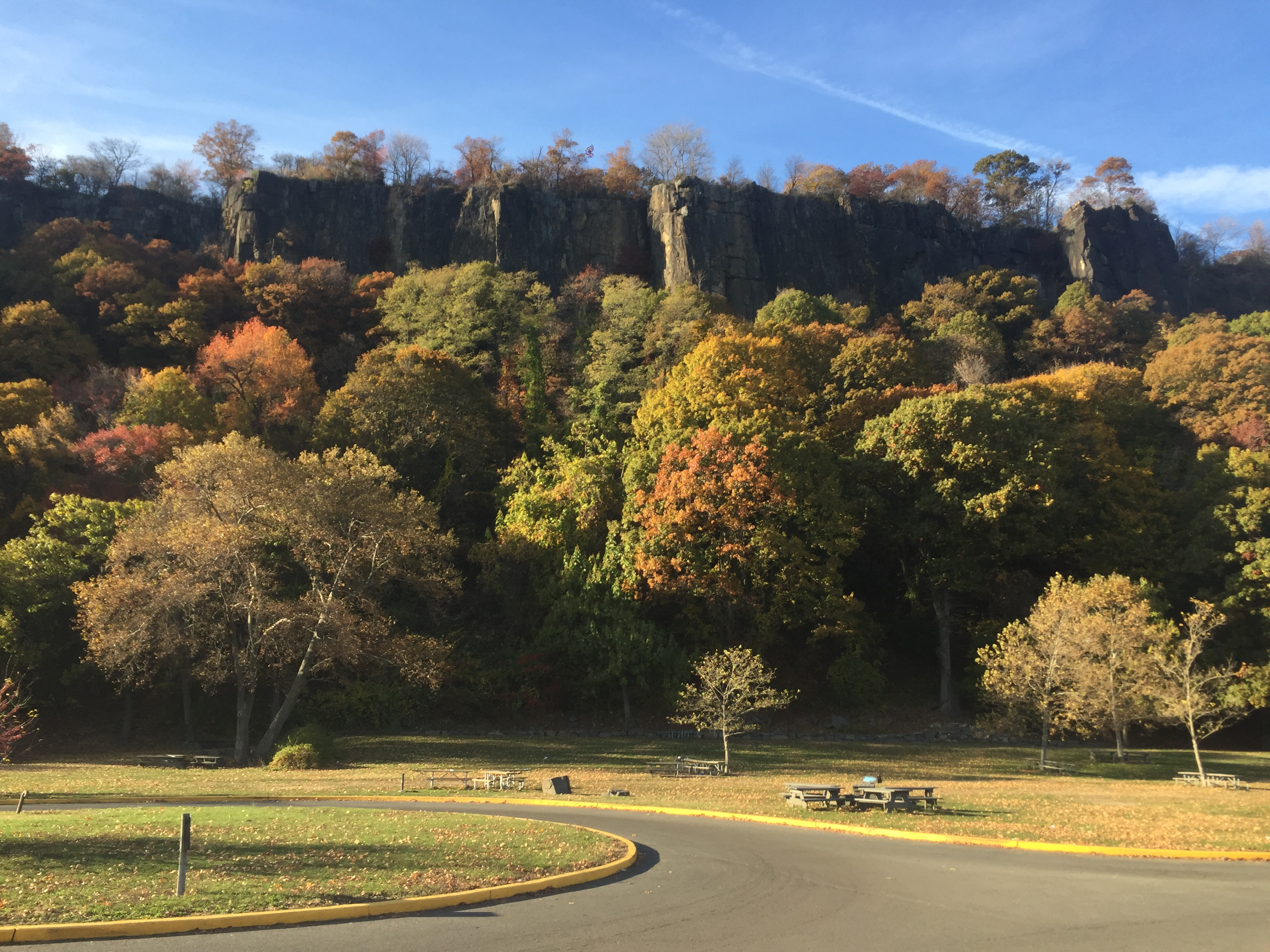
Fort Lee Historic Park, Ross Dock Picnic Area

== See also ==
- New Jersey in the American Revolution
- Battle of Fort Washington
- Hudson River Chain
- New Bridge Landing
- Palisades Interstate Park

== Bibliography ==
- Adams, Arthur G. (1996). The Hudson River Guidebook. New York: Fordham University Press. ISBN 978-0-8232-1679-6.
- Fischer, David Hackett (2004). "The Retreat. Cornwallis and the Conquest of New Jersey". Washington's Crossing. New York: Oxford University Press. ISBN 0-19-517034-2.
- Hall, Edward Hagaman (1909). "Fort Lee, New Jersey. A Sketch of its Revolutionary History". Fourteenth Annual Report. New York: The American Scenic and Historic Preservation Society.
- Lefkowitz, Arthur S. (1998). The Long Retreat: The Calamitous American Defense of New Jersey, 1776. New Brunswick, New Jersey: Rutgers University Press. ISBN 978-08135-2759-8.
- Mack, Arthur C. (1909). "Historic Old Fort Lee". The Palisades of The Hudson. Edgewater, New Jersey: The Palisade Press. p. 13.
- Spring, John (2007). "The Invasion and the Myths Surrounding It". In Karels, Carol (ed.). The Revolutionary War in Bergen County. South Carolina: History Press. ISBN 978-1-59629-358-8.
