= Burdett's Landing =

Site on the west bank of the Hudson River in Edgewater, New Jersey, United States

Coordinates: 40.833877°N 73.968440°W

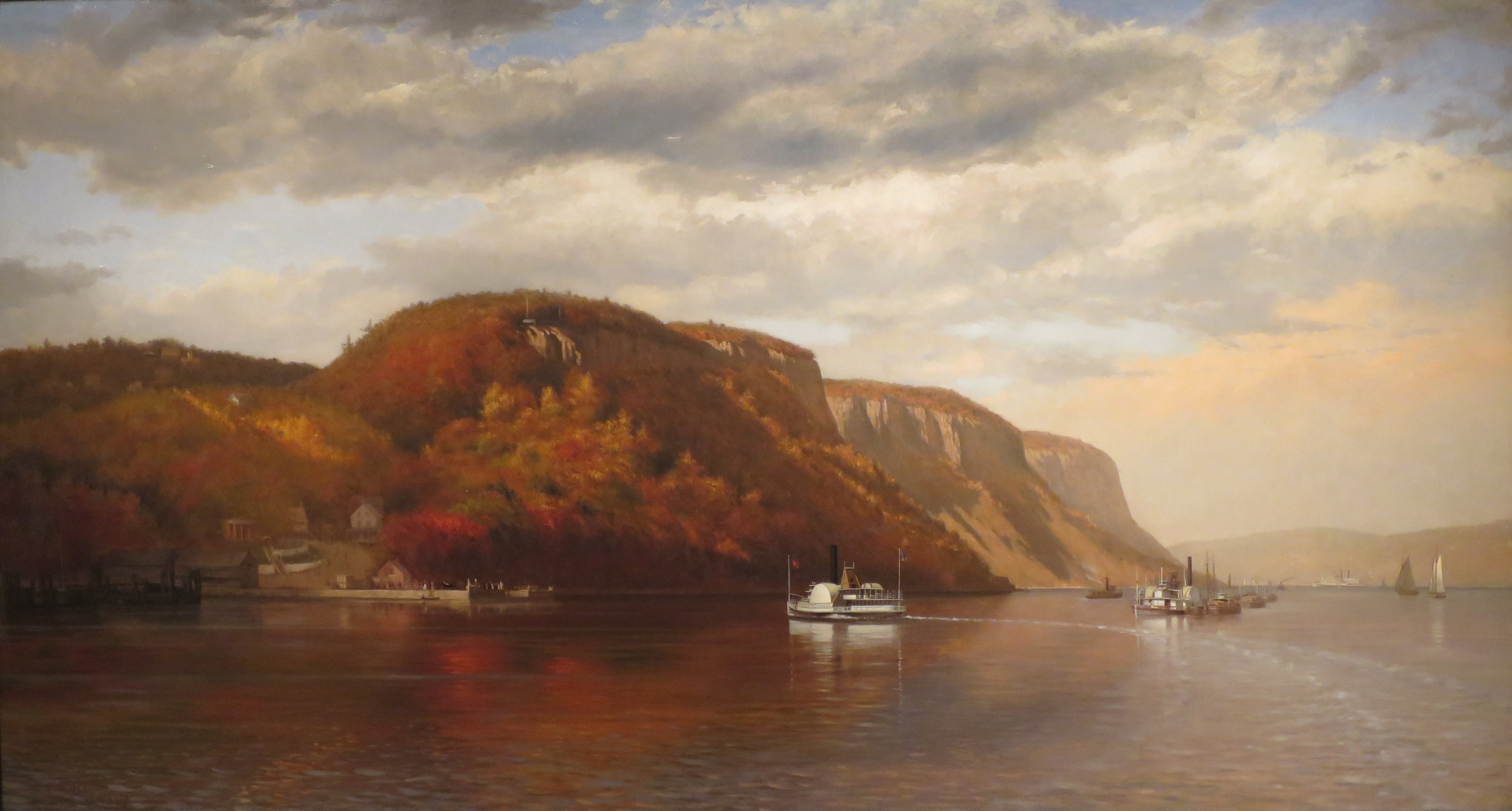
Painting from 1867 showing Burdett's Landing. John George Brown (1831-1913), On the Hudson, 1867, oil on canvas, 39 x 72 inches, Fine Arts Museums of San Francisco, Gift of Mr. and Mrs. John D. Rockefeller 3rd, 1979.7.19

Burdett's Landing, also called Burdett's Ferry, is a site on the west bank of the Hudson River located in Edgewater, New Jersey. Ferries initially used Burdett's Landing as a departure point for transporting agricultural produce from New Jersey across to New York. In the Revolutionary War it played a role in the movement of American supplies and soldiers, and in the 19th century it served as a landing for steamboats. There is no longer a wharf or ferry service at the landing.

== Location ==
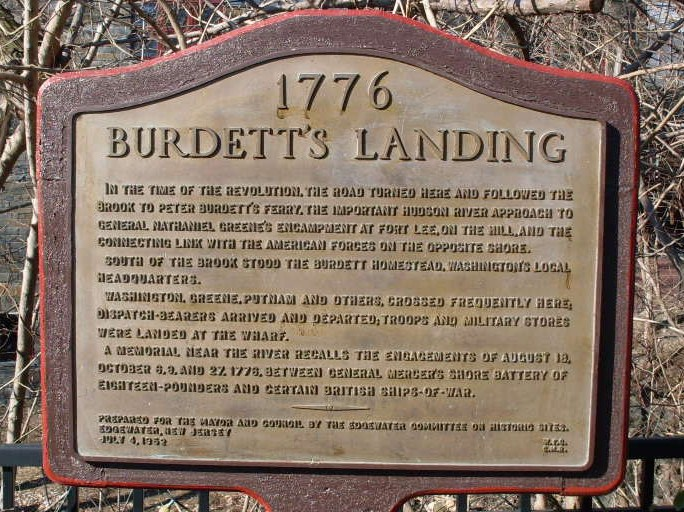
Burdett's Landing plaque

Burdett's Landing lay adjacent to a 250-foot (76 m) bluff formerly known as Mt. Constitution, now known as Fort Lee Historic Park. The bluff slopes downward on the south side and levels out sufficiently to make access practical. Burdett's Landing was created here in a small cove. A 1900 history described it as lying at "the bottom of a clove [i.e., ravine] giving easy access to the top of the Palisades and at the outlet of a small watercourse known as Dead Brook." The landing no longer exists, and the property lies in the current Edgewater Colony, an organization which owns all land cooperatively. A plaque beside the Edgewater Colony's meeting hall, located about 100 feet (30 m) from the original site, commemorates Burdett's Landing.

== History ==
=== Pre-Revolutionary War ===
The Lenni Lenape of the Algonquian nation were present in the vicinity prior to the founding of Burdett's Landing and appear to have lived in the area for thousands of years before the arrival of Europeans. Their presence diminished as contact with colonists led to illnesses and loss of their traditional lands through encroachment. In the mid-18th century the land which would become Burdett's Landing was owned by a freed slave, who had received it in exchange for his work shoring up a road to the top of the bluff with several hundred yards of retaining wall.

Stephen (né Étienne) Bourdette, a New York merchant of Huguenot heritage, purchased 400 acres (1.6 km^{2}) in the Fort Lee/Edgewater vicinity from the freedman in 1756. He built a gambrel-roofed stone house in a forest clearing at the bottom of the gorge, and moved his father, also named Étienne Bourdette, into the residence. (Stephen anglicized his Christian name from Étienne. His surname is seen in different spellings of Burdett and Bourdette.) Stephen Bourdette's parcel of land gained access to outlying areas via the Hackensack Turnpike, a route followed today north and south by Hudson Terrace and a section River Road (County Route 505), connecting with Main Street in Fort Lee for destinations to the west. A stage line also ran from the landing to Hackensack via Leonia. For commerce with travelers, Bourdette founded a trading post and ferry service. In 1758 he began ferrying goods and people from a protected area of shoreline on the Hudson River in periaguas. These were row-and-sail vessels with two masts and a shallow draft, capable of carrying heavy loads. Initially Burdett's Landing was used by farmers sending their products across to the Bloomingdale section of Manhattan, which at that time was the west side of New York between 23rd and 125th Streets. He is also noted as operating sloops to various points and a row-and-sail ferry to about 152nd Street in Manhattan.

Stephen's brother, Peter, a farmer who had been living in Hackensack, came to Burdett's Landing with his wife in about 1760 to look after Étienne, Senior, in his old age. The father died at 80, and Stephen gave the property to Peter "several years before the war."

=== Revolutionary War ===
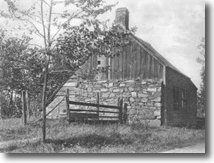
Bourdette house, used by Gen. Washington during the Revolution

General George Washington issued orders to General Mercer to summon all available troops and erect a fort on the west side of the Hudson River. The land to which Washington referred lay on the Bourdette property. Construction commenced in July 1776 on the new fort, to be called Fort Constitution. It was located on the western side of the road that led up the hill from the landing. Concurrently, Fort Washington was being built almost directly across the river in New York. At first efforts were concentrated close to the water level near the Bourdette dwelling. Later, fortifications were added atop the bluff under the supervision of Joseph Philips, Battalion Commander of the New Jersey State Militia. The Bourdette's ferry service was taken over by the Army, and Peter Bourdette was forced to vacate his house; although as a patriot he considered it no sacrifice and offered the work of his slaves to General Mercer's construction efforts. At the end of September 1776, Fort Constitution was renamed Fort Lee, for General Charles Lee of the Continental Army. George Washington used the stone Bourdette house for his headquarters when he passed time at Fort Lee. At this stage of the war the ferry operated as a supply line and the only link between Forts Lee and Washington.

The Ferry was the site of a minor skirmish on October 27, 1776, between two British frigates on the North River and various Colonial units in the area. The British came up the river either to attack the Ferry or to support their ground forces on Harlem Plain. However, they did little or no damage to the colonials, while one of the British ships was severely damaged by artillery on York Island before they withdrew.

Peter Bourdette's sixteen-year-old son, also named Peter, provided assistance to the American war effort by direct use of the landing. During the week leading up to the evacuation of Fort Lee he rowed back and forth across the river gathering information for General Washington on the anticipated movements of the British forces. Well after dark on the night before the battle for New York at Fort Washington, George Washington was rowed from Burdett's Landing to the middle of the Hudson River for a strategy session with his senior officers in charge of New York, who rowed to meet him. On November 16, 1776, George Washington witnessed the battle for New York from across the river on the bluff of Fort Lee, above Burdett's Landing.

General Washington ordered the retreat from Fort Lee on November 20, which left the Bourdettes in a dangerous situation with the approach of the enemy. Peter Bourdette sent his wife, Rachel, and his family to safety, keeping his 16-year-old son to help him protect the homestead. They were ineffective in the face of troops, and the landing was plundered by the British regulars and Hessian mercenaries. Rachel Bourdette returned to their home after the soldiers' departure and found all her supplies taken and her animals gone, except for one horse she had hidden. Although enemy troops periodically raided the area for supplies, the family survived the winter. Eventually the tide of war flowed away from the area.

=== Post-Revolutionary War ===
After the war the ferry service returned to its farm trade. Peter Bourdette died at the age of 91 in 1823. Burdett's Landing experienced a transformation in the 19th century when steam power was applied to ships, and it became an important landing for steamboats. The Crystenah left New York City's Pier 39 every evening at 6:30 and stopped at Burdett's Landing along its route. In addition, Burdett's Ferry's own company, the Fort Lee & New York Steamboat Company, began operating in 1832 and ran until about 1920. Also known as The People's Ferry Company, it owned at least five steamboats which made stops along the Hudson running south, then crossing to New York City.

A demand for paving stones developed in the 19th century as New York City sought to pave its streets. Quarrying operations designed to produce paving blocks appeared on the Palisades Cliff as a result. Burdett's Landing acquired the nickname, "Old Stone Dock," from its service as a transfer location for cobblestones onto lighters bound for New York. This use for Burdett's Landing came to an end when the quarrying and accompanying destruction of the Palisades was brought to an end by the creation of the Palisades Interstate Park in 1900.

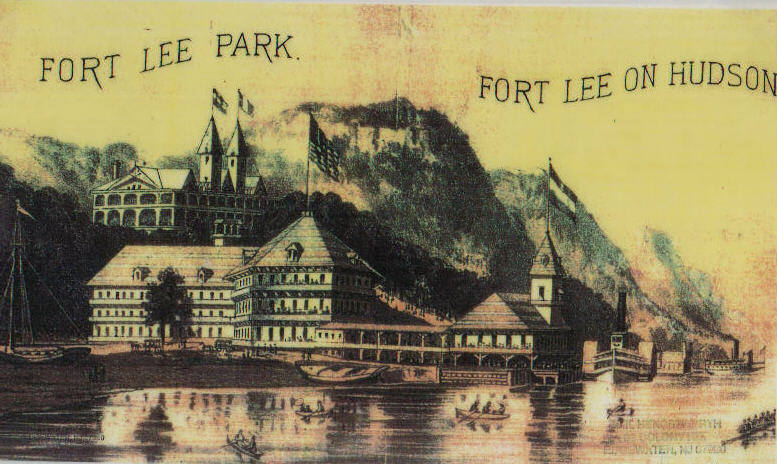
Resort Hotel by Burdett's Landing

During the 19th century the Burdett's Landing neighborhood gradually developed as a resort. New Yorkers came to view the sleepy, pastoral little area as a recreational destination, and in 1878 the large Fort Lee Hotel opened by the landing. Also known as the Octagon House because of its design, the Fort Lee Hotel was accessible via ferry for New Yorkers. According to one pictorial history,

Its 60 rooms each had gas lighting, and the hotel had its own ferry service from its grounds to 129th Street in Manhattan. Guests were provided with picnic grounds, band concerts, a roller-skating rink, outdoor shows, and rustic walkways.

Fire destroyed the hotel in 1898, and the owners did not rebuild. The pilings still are seen above the waterline of the Hudson just south of the Fort Lee bluff as a locator for the palatial resort. With the industrialization of Edgewater in the early 20th century the desire to use the area as a resort faded. The house created by Stephen Bourdette for his father stood until 1899. In the 20th century river crossings were handled by other ferries, and Burdett's Landing was no longer needed. Its former location may be seen in an aerial view at the Edgewater Colony website noted in External links below. It was assimilated into the Colony's property when it incorporated in 1948.

== Sources ==
- Adams, Arthur G. (1996). The Hudson River Guidebook. Fordham University Press. ISBN 978-0-8232-1679-6.
- Hall, Donald E.; Edgewater Cultural; Historical Committee (2005). Images of America: Edgewater. Charleston, SC: Arcadia. ISBN 0-7385-3725-X.
- Van Walen, James M. (1900). History of Bergen County, New Jersey. New Jersey Publishing and Engraving Co.
