= Steuben House =

Historic house in New Jersey, US

- Steuben Estate Complex; Ackerman–Zabriskie–Steuben House
- U.S. National Register of Historic Places
- U.S. Historic district
- New Jersey Register of Historic Places
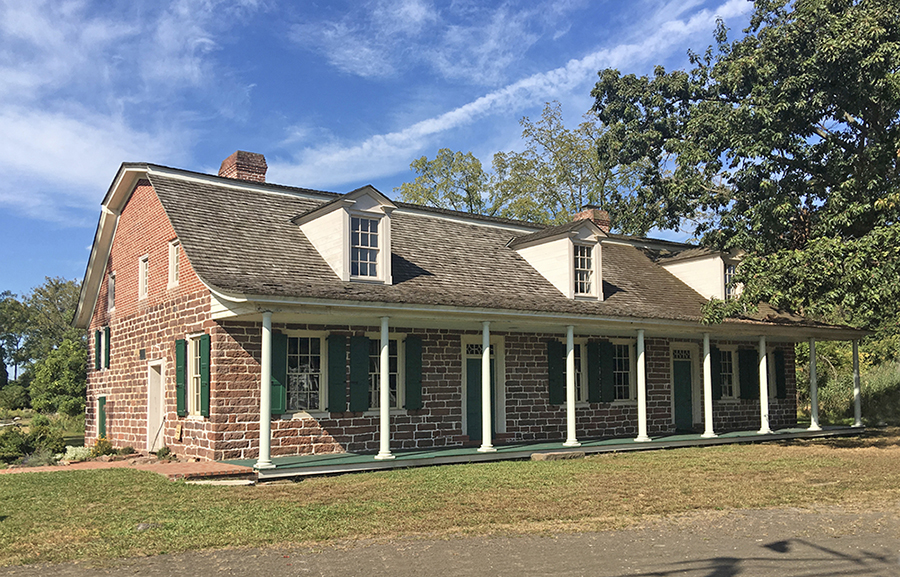
- Steuben House in 2019

- Location within Bergen County, New Jersey Location within New Jersey Location within the United States
- Location: New Bridge Road, Main Street and Hackensack River; River Edge, New Jersey
- Coordinates: 40.9137°N 74.0307°W
- Area: 6 acres (2.4 ha)
- Built: 1752
- Architectural style: Colonial, Dutch Colonial
- MPS: Early Stone Houses of Bergen County
- NRHP reference No.: 70000381 (original); 80004403 (increase 1); 83001457 (increase 2)
- NJRHP No.: 656

Significant dates
- Added to NRHP: December 18, 1970
- Designated HD: December 9, 1980
- Designated NJRHP: August 23, 1979

The Steuben House is a noted example of Bergen Dutch sandstone architecture, located at New Bridge Landing on the Hackensack River in River Edge, in Bergen County, New Jersey, United States.

It was confiscated from Loyalist Jan Zabriskie, and served as a military headquarters through much of the Revolutionary War. General George Washington made it his headquarters, September 4 to 17, 1780. Following the war, it was given to Major General Baron Friedrich Wilhelm von Steuben, who occupied it from 1783 to 1788.

The house was added to the National Register of Historic Places on December 18, 1970, for its significance in architecture and military history. The Steuben Estate Complex, a 6-acre (2.4 ha) national historic district, was listed on December 9, 1980, for its significance in architecture, exploration/settlement, and invention. In addition to the Steuben House, the district includes three historic buildings moved from other sites. Named the Ackerman–Zabriskie–Steuben House, it was listed as part of the Early Stone Houses of Bergen County Multiple Property Submission (MPS) on January 10, 1983, for its significance in architecture and exploration/settlement. The Bergen County Historical Society opens the New Jersey State Historic site and two other sandstone houses and barn to the public for special events.

== History ==
The Steuben House has long been esteemed a Revolutionary landmark. Its architecture and historic furnishings recall the Bergen Dutch, an agricultural community whose language and culture blended contributions from Dutch, Angolan African, German, English, French, Scottish and Scandinavian settlers. At a place known originally as Aschatking (where the river narrows), about ten miles (16 km) above the head of Newark Bay, a Swedish land-clearer named Cornelius Mattyse acquired 420 acres (1.7 km^{2}) at the juncture of Tantaqua's Creek (Cole's Brook) and the Hackensack River, in 1682.

This was called Tantaqua's Plain, where a Hackensack sachem of that name resided with his kinfolk. David Ackerman, residing in the village of Hackensack, purchased the land from Matheus Corneliuson, son of Cornelius Matheus of Hackensack River, in 1695. He devised that portion of this tract of land lying east of Kinderkamack Road to his son, Johannes Ackerman, who built a dwelling on the Steenrapie (Kinderkamack) Road at the time of his marriage to Jannetje Lozier in 1713. A tidal gristmill was built on the Hackensack River. This mill got its power from an artificial pond: the high tide was trapped in the mouth of Cole's Brook by a dam with a special drop-gate, suspended from a horizontal timber. When the tides flowed out of the Hackensack River, the tidal millpond was slowly released through the waterwheel. Sloops pulled alongside the mill at New Bridge Landing. On March 9, 1744, a road was surveyed from Kinderkamack Road to the chosen spot on the banks of the Hackensack River where a "New Bridge" was to be erected (forming what is now Main Street, River Edge).

Jan and Annetje (Ackerman) Zabriskie purchased the Johannes Ackerman mill and farm in September 1745, shortly after construction of the first draw-bridge at the narrows of the Hackensack River. This wooden span was called New Bridge to distinguish it from an older crossing several miles upstream. In 1752, Jan Zabriskie built the oldest part of the Steuben House. Its walls were built with blocks of sandstone cut from the Kinderkamack Ridge - dressed stone on the two sides of the building facing the roadway and coursed rubble on the other sides. The front door opened into a center-hall. The Zabriskie family grew wealthy from increased trade brought on by the French and Indian War (1756–1763) and doubled the size of their dwelling about 1765, increasing it from five to twelve rooms, warmed by seven fireplaces, and covering it with a fashionable gambrel roof. The gambrel roof has four slopes instead of two, providing more headroom and storage space in the garret (for this reason, many barns used a gambrel roof to increase the size of the hay mow). The Jersey Dutch also adopted the gambrel roof to span the depth of a house that was one-and-a-half to two rooms deep. New Bridge Landing was the business center of the upper Hackensack Valley. Iron made in stone furnaces along the Ramapo Mountains was carried in ox-carts to New Bridge Landing where it was loaded onto sloops, some as large as 50 ton, for shipment to market. Flour and animal feed was shipped from the mill. All kinds of wares came in from boats returning from the city. This location had an added advantage: because of the wide Hackensack Meadowlands downstream, New Bridge remained the nearest river crossing to Newark Bay until 1790. Overland traffic including farm wagons and stage coaches, going to and from New York City, crossed the river at this spot on their way into the interior parts of the country.

The house was occupied as a military headquarters during much of the American Revolutionary War. General Washington headquartered here in September 1780 for 14 days when the Continental Army encamped on the Kinderkamack Ridge.

While a constant arena for conflict, the following significant Revolutionary War events are associated with Historic New Bridge Landing:

- November 20, 1776: 5,000 British and Hessian troops, under the command of Cornwallis, crossed the Hudson River and scaled the Palisades at Lower Closter Dock, then marched south against Fort Lee. Warned by a sentinel, the troops at Fort Lee [2,500-3,000] led by General Greene evacuated Fort Lee narrowly missing an encounter with the British at the Liberty Pole [Englewood]. Washington marched at the head of the troops towards the bridge and avoided entrapment by safely crossing the Hackensack River at New Bridge, "the Bridge That Saved a Nation." The events were witnessed by Thomas Paine and inspired him to write "THESE are the times that try men's souls" and fifth paragraph: "Our first object was to secure the bridge over the Hackensack..." in the American Crisis.
- November 21, 1776: British troops under Major General Vaughan attacked the American rear guard and seized the New Bridge, which American engineers were dismantling.
- May 18, 1779: British and Loyalist troops under command of Captain Patrick Fergusen attacked about 40 Bergen militiamen at New Bridge.
- August 18, 1779: Major Henry Lee led American troops from New Bridge, to attack the British earthworks at Paulus Hook (Jersey City).
- March 23, 1780: A force of Bergen Militia and Continental troops attacked 600 British troops and German auxiliaries at New Bridge on their retreat from Hackensack and Paramus, during the two hours it took for the British to repair and cross the New Bridge.
- April 15, 1780: A body of 312 British, Loyalist and German infantry, attacked and overwhelmed an American outpost at New Bridge commanded by Lieutenant Bryson.
- May 30, 1780: Eight British soldiers were killed, and several wounded, by friendly fire when British troops attempted to attack a body of Bergen Militia in the Zabriskie-Steuben House at New Bridge.
- July 20, 1780: Brigadier General Anthony Wayne led American troops from New Bridge on a raid against the Bull's Ferry Blockhouse.
- September 4–17, 1780: General Washington made his headquarters in the Zabriskie-Steuben House during the Steenrapie encampment of the Continental Army, encompassing nearly 14,000 men.

The State of New Jersey confiscated the stone mansion from Jan Zabriskie, a Loyalist, in 1781. The New Jersey Legislature gave the Zabriskie estate at New Bridge to Major General Baron von Steuben, the Inspector General of the Continental Army, on December 23, 1783, on condition that he occupy it and not rent it to a tenant. To meet these terms he had to keep a bed and servant at all times and make regular visits. His aide-de-camp, Captain Benjamin Walker, resided there, operating the mill and river dock in partnership with Jan Zabriskie. Captain Walker purchased the Zabriskie estate on Steuben's behalf in 1786. This is the only extant 18th century building that Steuben owned. Steuben renovated the war-damaged house and sold the house to back to the Zabriskie family, Jan, son of the Loyalist, in 1788. His grandson, John J. Zabriskie, died trying to free the mill waterwheel in 1793. Andrew Zabriskie, a cousin, purchased the Steuben House in 1815. His descendants owned the property until 1909.

The Steuben House Commission was created in 1926 to purchase Baron Steuben's home at New Bridge. The State took possession of the historic mansion and 1-acre (4,000 m^{2}) of ground for $9,000 on June 27, 1928. It was renovated and opened as the museum headquarters of the Bergen County Historical Society in September 1939. The Bergen County Historical Society continued stewardship of the site by purchase of land between the Steuben House and the encroaching autoparts yard in 1944. In 1954, the Society was able to persuade the County of Bergen to divert the planned 4-lane highway to the north of the site instead of alongside the historic site. The highway bridge opened in 1956 and the one-lane 1889 swing bridge was closed to vehicles. It remains open for pedestrians.

== Historic district ==
The Steuben House, the bridge, the tide mill location and wharf are in the core area of Historic New Bridge Landing. Three additional buildings were moved onto the adjacent property of the Bergen County Historical Society, a private non-profit volunteer organization. The Demarest House was moved here from New Milford in 1956 and is maintained by the Blauvelt-Demarest Foundation. It was listed individually on the NRHP in 1983. The Westervelt-Thomas Barn was relocated from Washington Township in 1958. The County of Bergen moved the Campbell-Christie House here in 1977. It was also listed individually on the NRHP in 1983. The Society erected a working replica of a Bergen Dutch Out-Kitchen in 1991 and an outhouse in 2009.

The Historic New Bridge Landing Park Commission was established by law in 1995 to coordinate and implement all private and governmental plans and activities at Historic New Bridge Landing Park, which was named one of three new urban state parks in 2004.

== Gallery ==
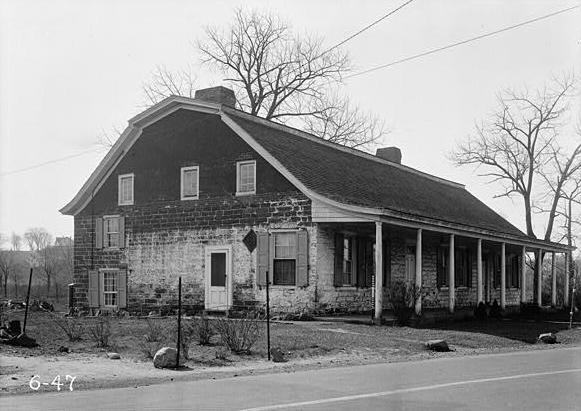
The Steuben House pictured in 1936

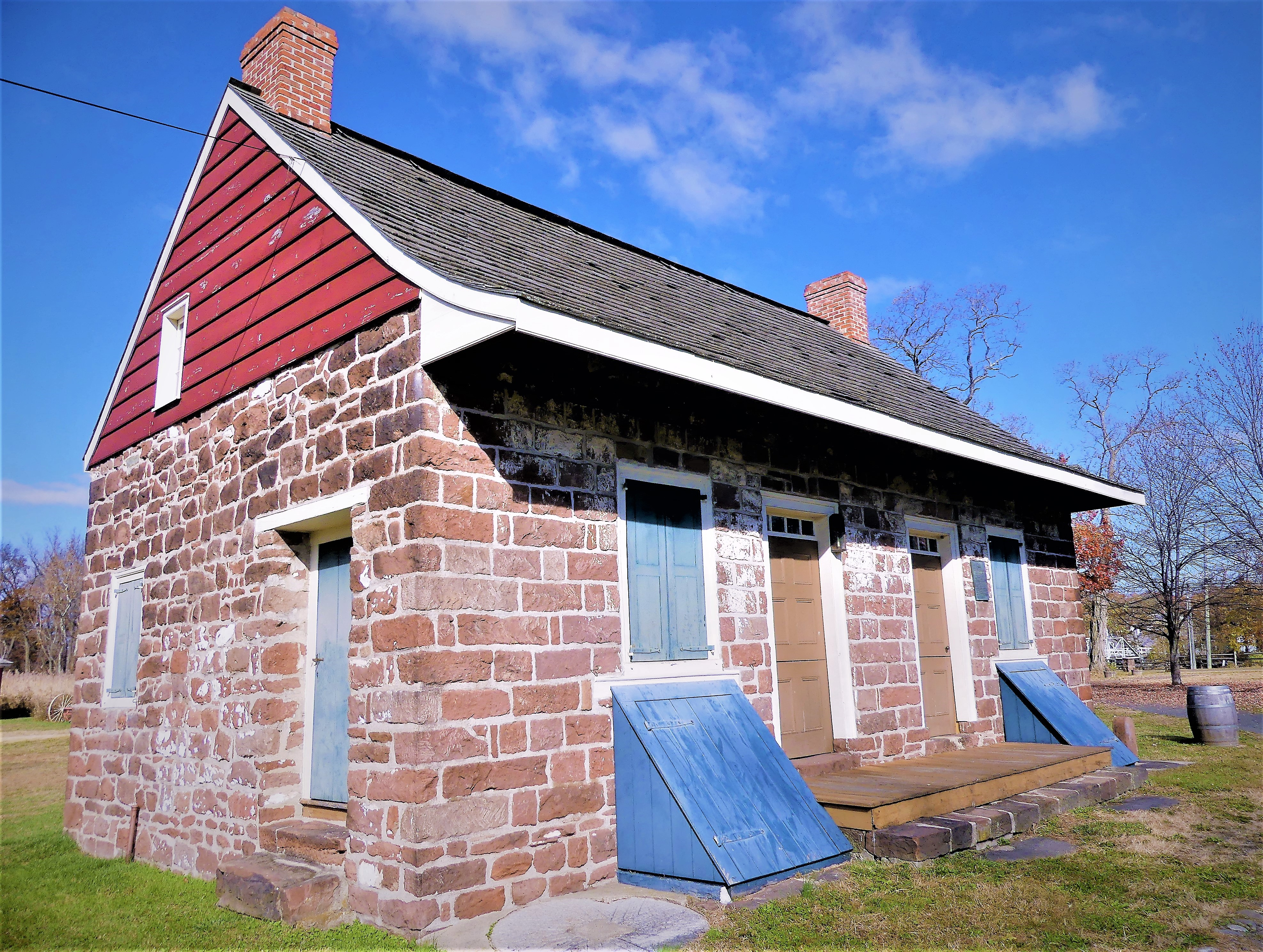
Demarest House

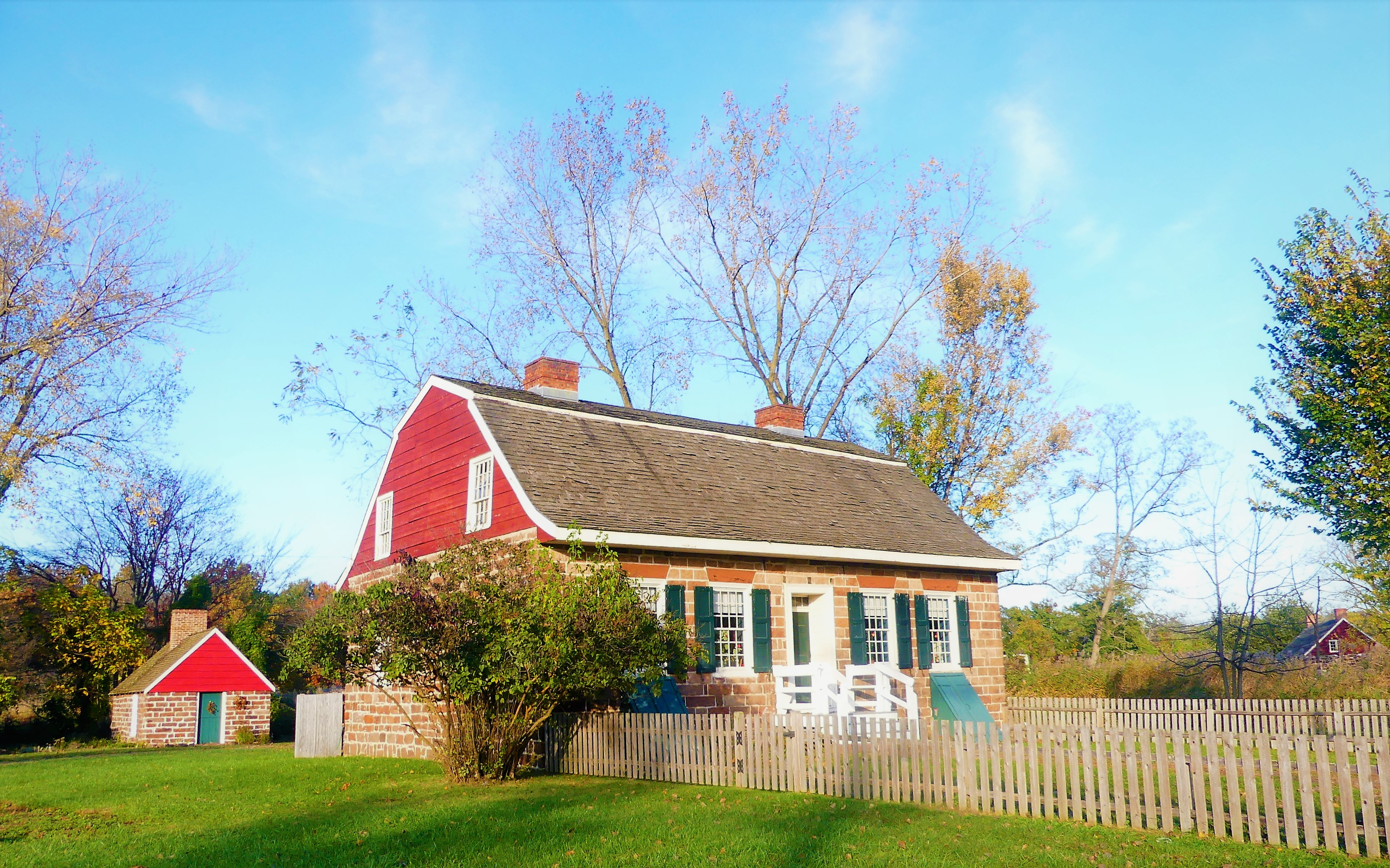
Campbell-Christie House with Out-Kitchen

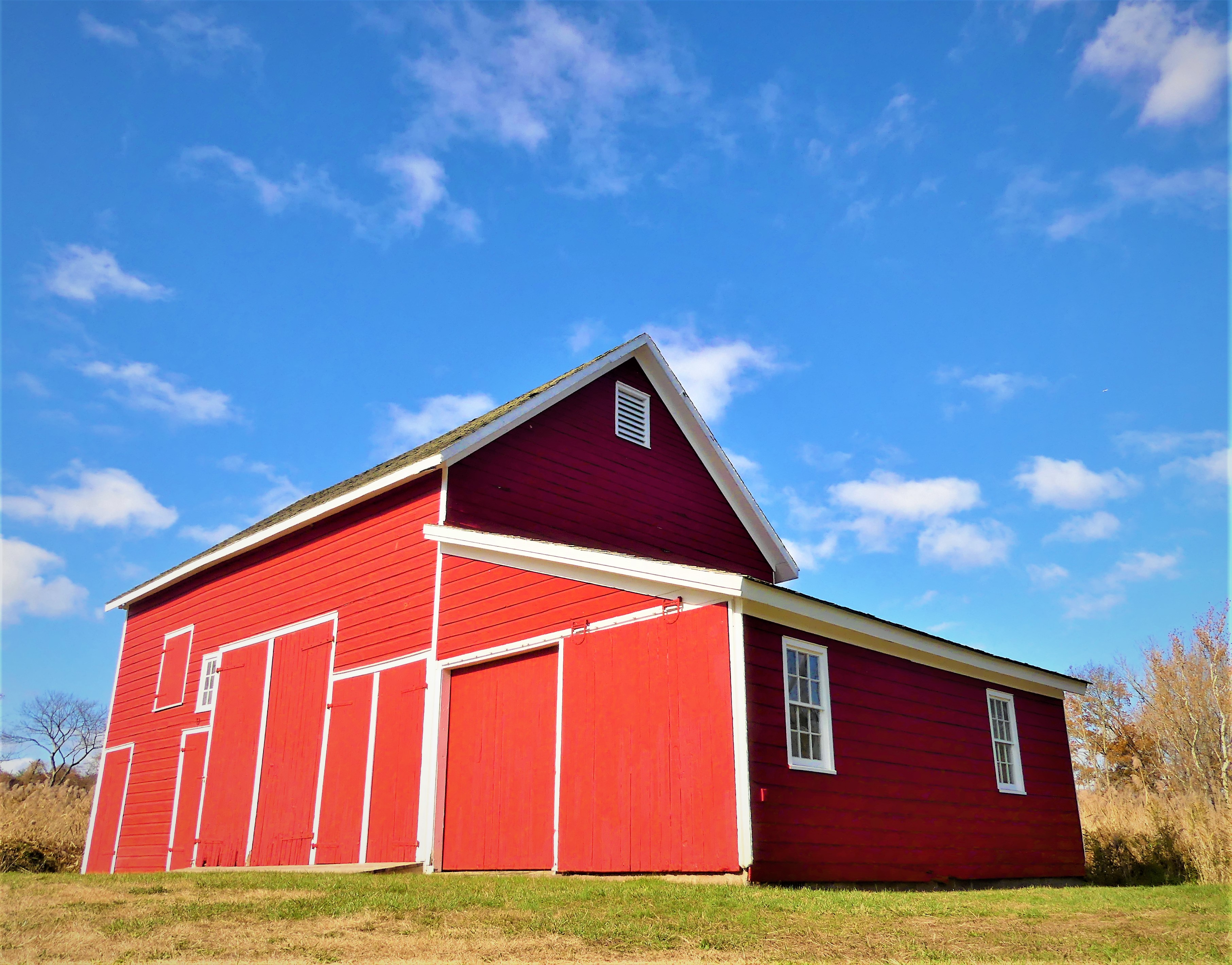
Westervelt-Thomas Barn

== 2007 flood ==
The Steuben House suffered little in the way of permanent damage in the April 2007 nor'easter.

== See also ==
- New Jersey during the American Revolution
- List of Washington's Headquarters during the Revolutionary War
- National Register of Historic Places listings in Bergen County, New Jersey
