= Hopper House =

Hopper House may refer to:

in the United States

(by state, then city)

- Hopper Court, Hopkinsville, Kentucky, listed on the National Register of Historic Places (NRHP) in Christian County, Kentucky
- Ackerman–Hopper House, Glen Rock, New Jersey, NRHP-listed
- Andrew H. Hopper House, Glen Rock, New Jersey, NRHP-listed
- Garret Hopper House, Glen Rock, New Jersey, NRHP-listed
- Hendrick Hopper House, Glen Rock, New Jersey, NRHP-listed
- John Hopper House, Hackensack, New Jersey, NRHP-listed
- Terhune–Hopper House (Ho-Ho-Kus, New Jersey), NRHP-listed
- Hopper–Van Horn House, Mahwah, New Jersey, NRHP-listed
- Demarest–Hopper House, Oakland, New Jersey, NRHP-listed
- Hopper House (Saddle River, New Jersey), NRHP-listed
- Hopper House (Upper Saddle River, New Jersey), NRHP-listed
- Hopper–Goetschius House, Upper Saddle River, New Jersey, NRHP-listed
- Terhune–Hopper House (Upper Saddle River, New Jersey), NRHP-listed
- Van Riper–Hopper House, Wayne, New Jersey, NRHP-listed
- Isaac T. Hopper House, New York, New York, NRHP-listed
- Edward Hopper Birthplace and Boyhood Home, Nyack, New York, NRHP-listed
- Hopper-Snyder Homestead, Watsontown, Pennsylvania, NRHP-listed
