= Terhune–Hopper House =

Terhune–Hopper House may refer to either of two distinct NRHP-listed houses:

- Terhune–Hopper House (Ho-Ho-Kus, New Jersey), listed on the National Register of Historic Places in Bergen County
- Terhune–Hopper House (Upper Saddle River, New Jersey), listed on the National Register of Historic Places in Bergen County
