= New North Reformed Low Dutch Church =

Historic church in New Jersey, United States

- U.S. National Register of Historic Places
- New Jersey Register of Historic Places
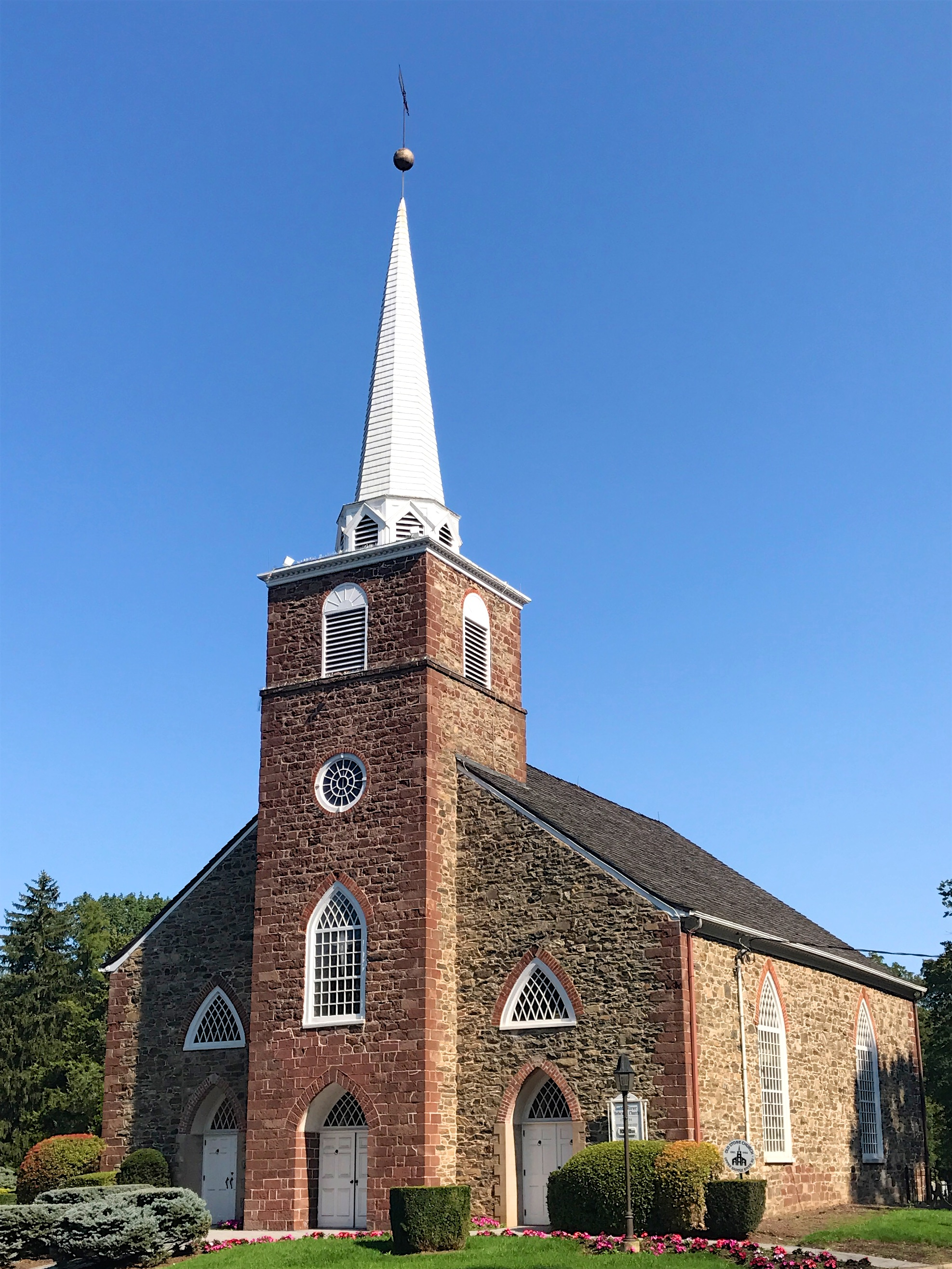
- The Old Stone Church in 2017

- Location within Bergen County, New Jersey Location within New Jersey Location within the United States
- Location: East Saddle River Road at Old Stone Church Road, Upper Saddle River, New Jersey
- Coordinates: 41°4′14″N 74°5′12″W
- Area: 6.5 acres (2.6 ha)
- Built: 1819
- NRHP reference No.: 82003263
- NJRHP No.: 712

Significant dates
- Added to NRHP: April 15, 1982
- Designated NJRHP: January 21, 1981

The New North Reformed Low Dutch Church, also known as the Saddle River Reformed Church and the Old Stone Church, is a historic Dutch Reformed church located on East Saddle River Road at Old Stone Church Road in the borough of Upper Saddle River in Bergen County, New Jersey, United States. The current church was built in 1819 and was documented by the Historic American Buildings Survey (HABS) program in 1936. The church building was added to the National Register of Historic Places on April 15, 1982, for its significance in architecture, exploration/settlement, religion, and social history.

== History and description ==
The congregation was organized in 1784, formed from the Paramus Reformed Church. An earlier church may have been built at the site around 1789. The current church was constructed from 1814 to 1819 and was restored from 1971 to 1972. The stone church features a replica pulpit based on the original imported from the Netherlands. The cemetery contains several graves of soldiers from the American Revolutionary War.

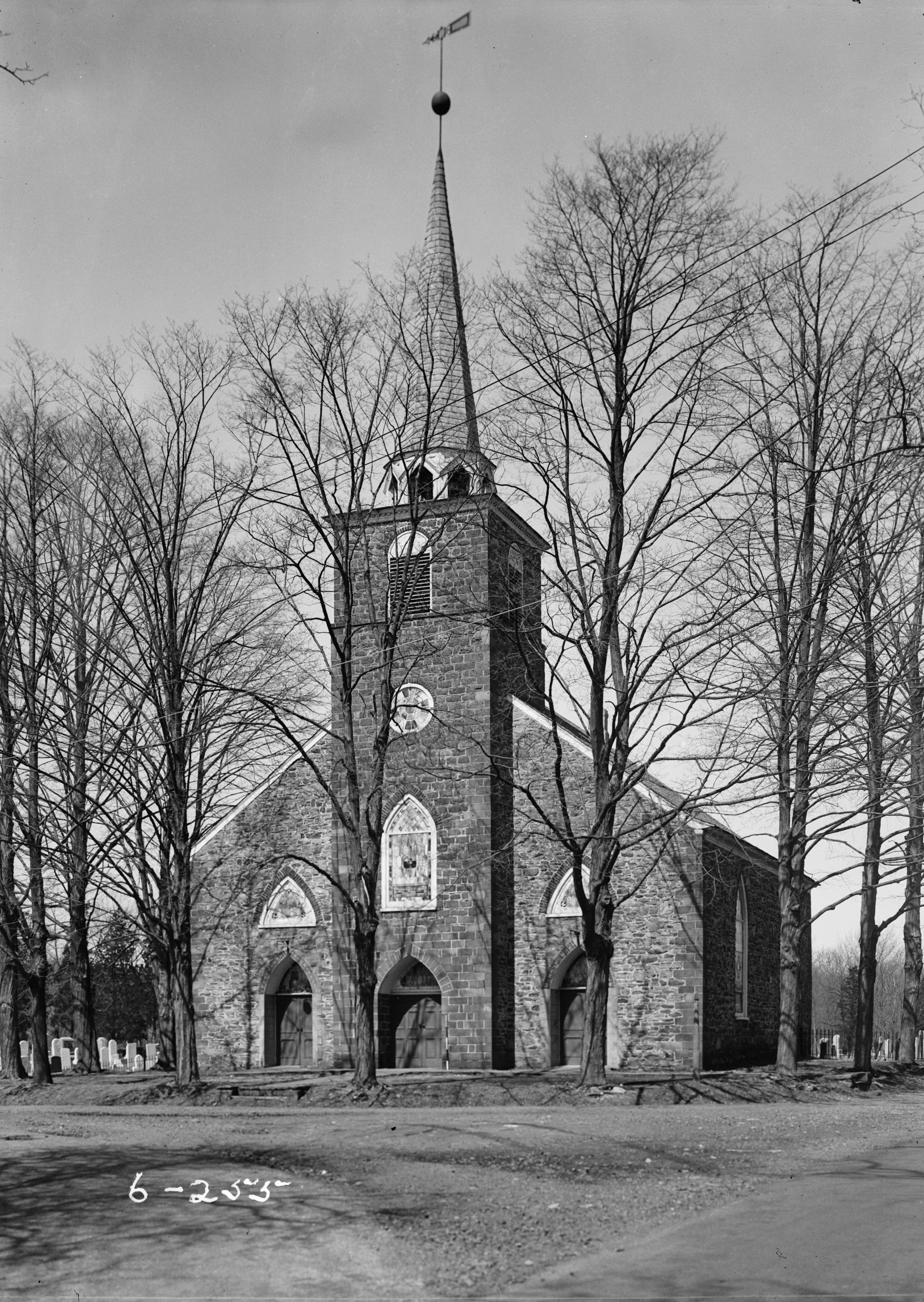
HABS photo from 1936

== See also ==
- National Register of Historic Places listings in Bergen County, New Jersey
