= Hopper House (Upper Saddle River, New Jersey) =

Historic house in New Jersey, United States

- U.S. National Register of Historic Places
- New Jersey Register of Historic Places
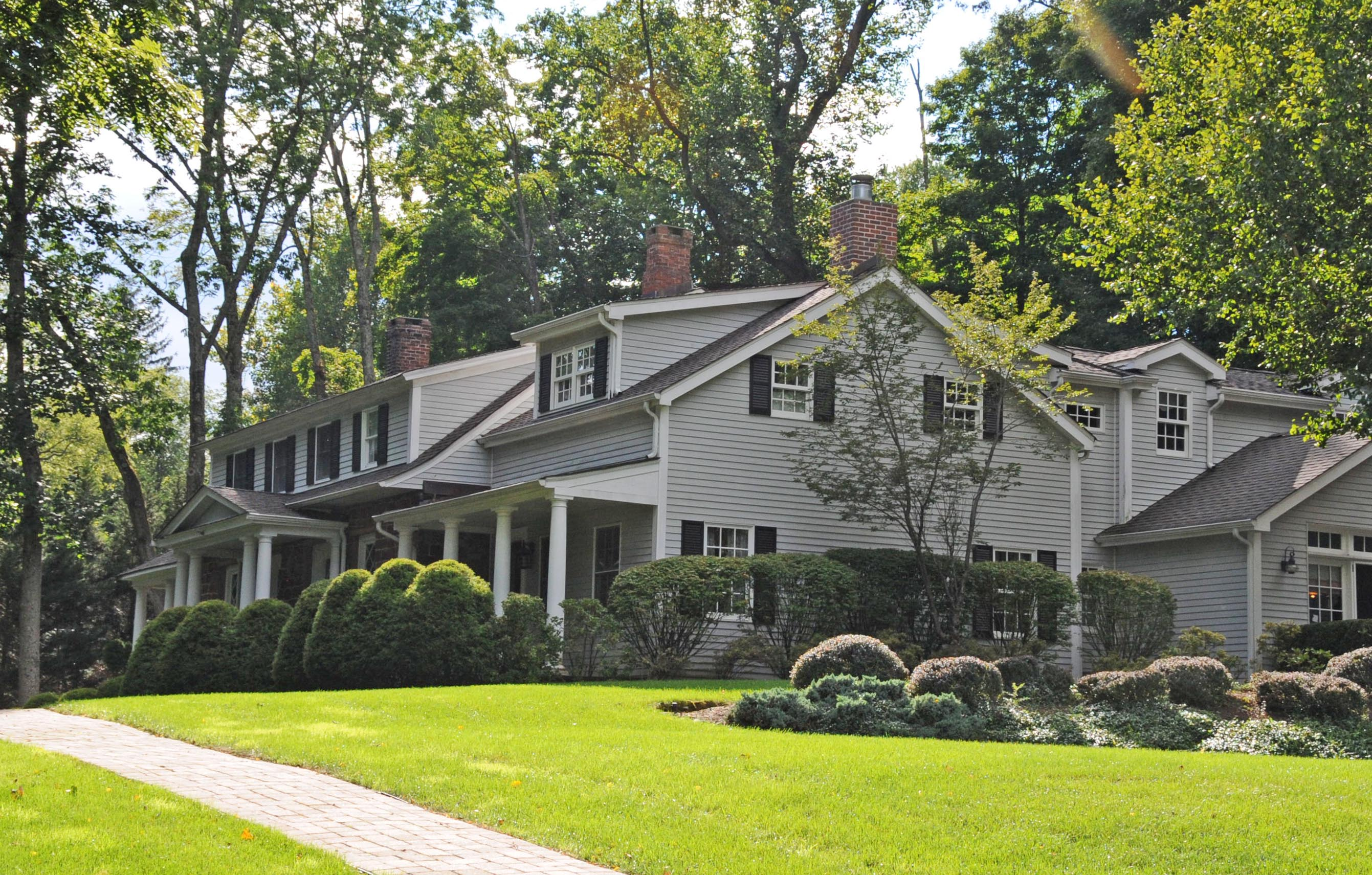

- Location within Bergen County, New Jersey Location within New Jersey Location within the United States
- Location: 72 Hopper Farm Road, Upper Saddle River, New Jersey
- Coordinates: 41°4′22″N 74°5′24″W
- Area: 1.8 acres (0.73 ha)
- Built: c. 1750–1760
- MPS: Stone Houses of Bergen County TR
- NRHP reference No.: 83001525
- NJRHP No.: 710

Significant dates
- Added to NRHP: January 10, 1983
- Designated NJRHP: October 3, 1980

The Hopper House is a historic stone house located at 72 Hopper Farm Road in the borough of Upper Saddle River in Bergen County, New Jersey, United States. The house was built around 1750–1760 and was added to the National Register of Historic Places on January 10, 1983, for its significance in architecture and exploration/settlement. It was listed as part of the Early Stone Houses of Bergen County Multiple Property Submission (MPS).

The property was owned by John Deremus and Jacob Servent in the 18th century. They may have been the builders. The Hopper family owned it in the 19th century.

== See also ==
- National Register of Historic Places listings in Bergen County, New Jersey
