= Upper Saddle River School District =

School district in Bergen County, New Jersey, US

Address
- 395 West Saddle River Road Upper Saddle River, Bergen County, New Jersey, 07458; United States
- Coordinates: 41.063007°N 74.098441°W

District information
- Grades: PreK-8
- Superintendent: C. Lauren Schoen (interim)
- Business administrator: Dana Imbasciani
- Schools: 3

Students and staff
- Enrollment: 1,099 (as of 2023–24)
- Faculty: 115.0 FTEs
- Student–teacher ratio: 9.6:1

Other information
- District Factor Group: J
- Website: District website
Ind.	Per pupil	District spending	Rank (*)	K-8 average	%± vs. average
1A	Total Spending	$18,054	57	$18,891	−4.4%
1	Budgetary Cost	15,057	64	14,159	6.3%
2	Classroom Instruction	8,724	49	8,659	0.8%
6	Support Services	2,598	72	2,167	19.9%
8	Administrative Cost	1,731	63	1,547	11.9%
10	Operations & Maintenance	1,889	71	1,612	17.2%
13	Extracurricular Activities	115	60	104	10.6%
16	Median Teacher Salary	58,350	24	61,136
Data from NJDoE 2014 Taxpayers' Guide to Education Spending. *Of K-8 districts with more than 750 students. Lowest spending=1; Highest=84

The Upper Saddle River School District is a community public school district that serves students in pre-kindergarten through eighth grade in Upper Saddle River in Bergen County, in the U.S. state of New Jersey.

As of the 2023–24 school year, the district, comprised of three schools, had an enrollment of 1,099 students and 115.0 classroom teachers (on an FTE basis), for a student–teacher ratio of 9.6:1.

Public school students in Upper Saddle River for ninth through twelfth grades attend Northern Highlands Regional High School, which also serves students from Allendale and Ho-Ho-Kus, along with some students from Saddle River, New Jersey (who have the option of attending either Northern Highlands or Ramsey High School, as part of sending/receiving relationships with the two districts). As of the 2023–24 school year, the high school had an enrollment of 1,261 students and 113.0 classroom teachers (on an FTE basis), for a student–teacher ratio of 11.2:1.

== History ==
Through the start of the 1957-58 school year, students from Upper Saddle River, as well as those from Allendale, Mahwah and Saddle River all attended Ramsey High School as part of sending/receiving relationships with the respective districts and the Ramsey Public School District. Allendale, Mahwah and Upper Saddle River left the Ramsey district in September 1958 once Mahwah High School was completed; Allendale and Upper Saddle River joined the Northern Highlands District once the school was opened in 1965.

The district had been classified by the New Jersey Department of Education as being in District Factor Group "J", the highest of eight groupings. District Factor Groups organize districts statewide to allow comparison by common socioeconomic characteristics of the local districts. From lowest socioeconomic status to highest, the categories are A, B, CD, DE, FG, GH, I and J.

== Awards and recognition ==
Edith A. Bogert Elementary School was honored by the National Blue Ribbon Schools Program in 2019, one of nine schools in the state recognized as Exemplary High Performing Schools.

== Schools ==
The schools in the district (with 2023–24 enrollment data from the National Center for Education Statistics) are:

Elementary schools

- Robert D. Reynolds Primary School with 345 students in grades PreK–2
  - Devin Severs, principal
- Edith A. Bogert Elementary School with 361 students in grades 3–5
  - David Kaplan, principal

Middle school

- Emil A. Cavallini Middle School with 387 students in grades 6–8
  - James J. McCusker, principal

== Administration ==
Core members of the district's administration include:

- C. Lauren Schoen, interim superintendent
- Dana Imbasciani, business administrator and board secretary

== Board of education ==
The district's board of education, comprised of seven members, sets policy and oversees the fiscal and educational operation of the district through its administration. As a Type II school district, the board's trustees are elected directly by voters to serve three-year terms of office on a staggered basis, with three seats up for election each year held (since 2012) as part of the November general election. The board appoints a superintendent to oversee the district's day-to-day operations and a business administrator to supervise the business functions of the district.

As of 2012, school elections were shifted from April to the November general election as part of an effort to reduce the costs of a standalone April vote.
