= Andrew H. Hopper House =

- U.S. National Register of Historic Places
- New Jersey Register of Historic Places
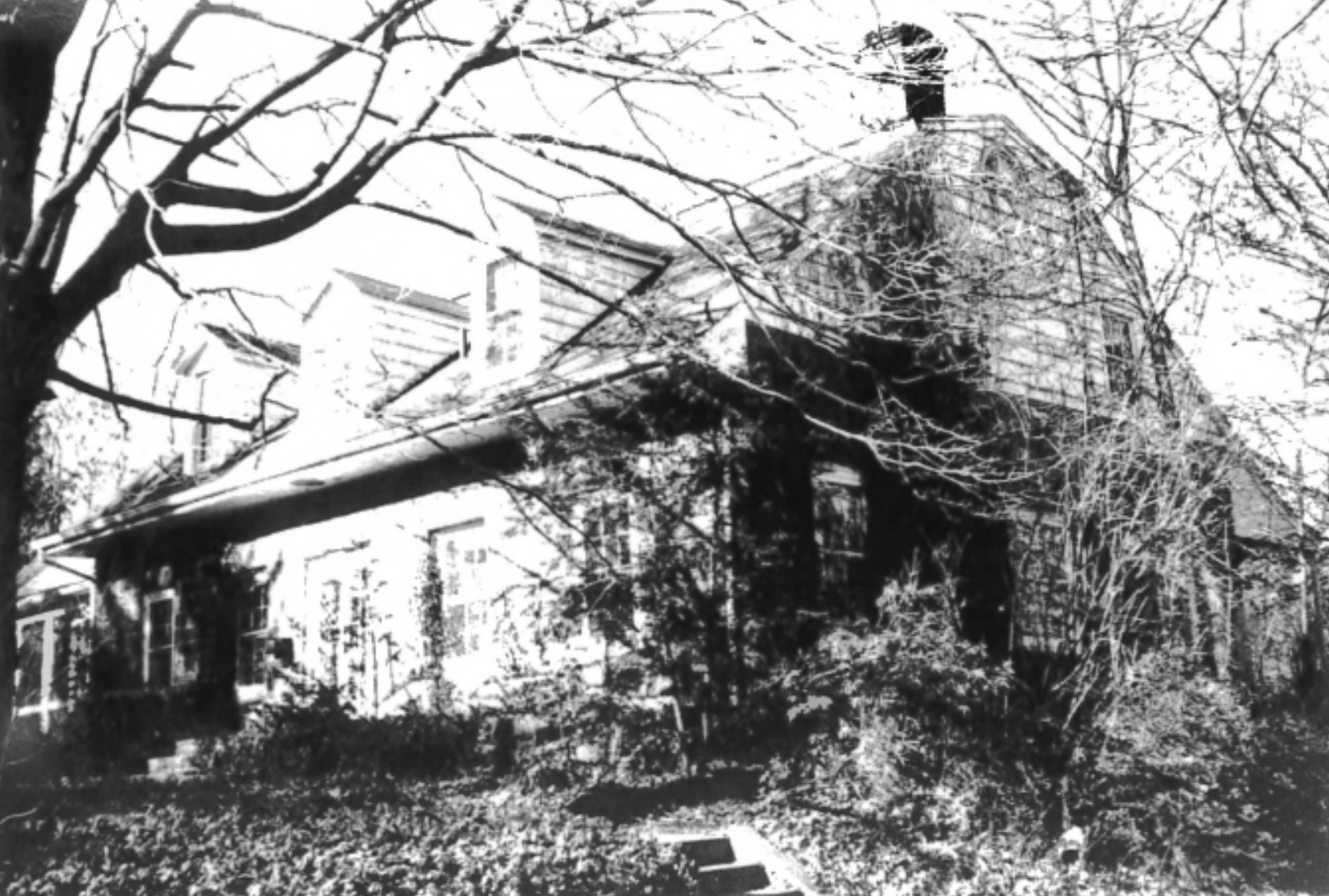

- Location within Bergen County, New Jersey Location within New Jersey Location within the United States
- Location: 762 Prospect Street, Glen Rock, New Jersey
- Coordinates: 40°57′23.5″N 74°06′36″W
- MPS: Stone Houses of Bergen County TR
- NRHP reference No.: 83001521
- NJRHP No.: 515

Significant dates
- Added to NRHP: January 9, 1983
- Designated NJRHP: October 3, 1980

The Andrew H. Hopper House is located at 762 Prospect Street in the borough of Glen Rock in Bergen County, New Jersey, United States. The historic stone house was added to the National Register of Historic Places on January 9, 1983, for its significance in architecture. It was listed as part of the Early Stone Houses of Bergen County Multiple Property Submission (MPS).

Based on architectural evidence, the house was built between 1770 and 1805. According to the nomination form, Andrew H. Hopper was building it when his father Hendrick Hopper died in 1805. He later sold it to his son, Henry A. Hopper.

== See also ==
- National Register of Historic Places listings in Bergen County, New Jersey
- Hendrick Hopper House
