= Ackerman–Hopper House =

Historic house in New Jersey, US

- U.S. National Register of Historic Places
- New Jersey Register of Historic Places
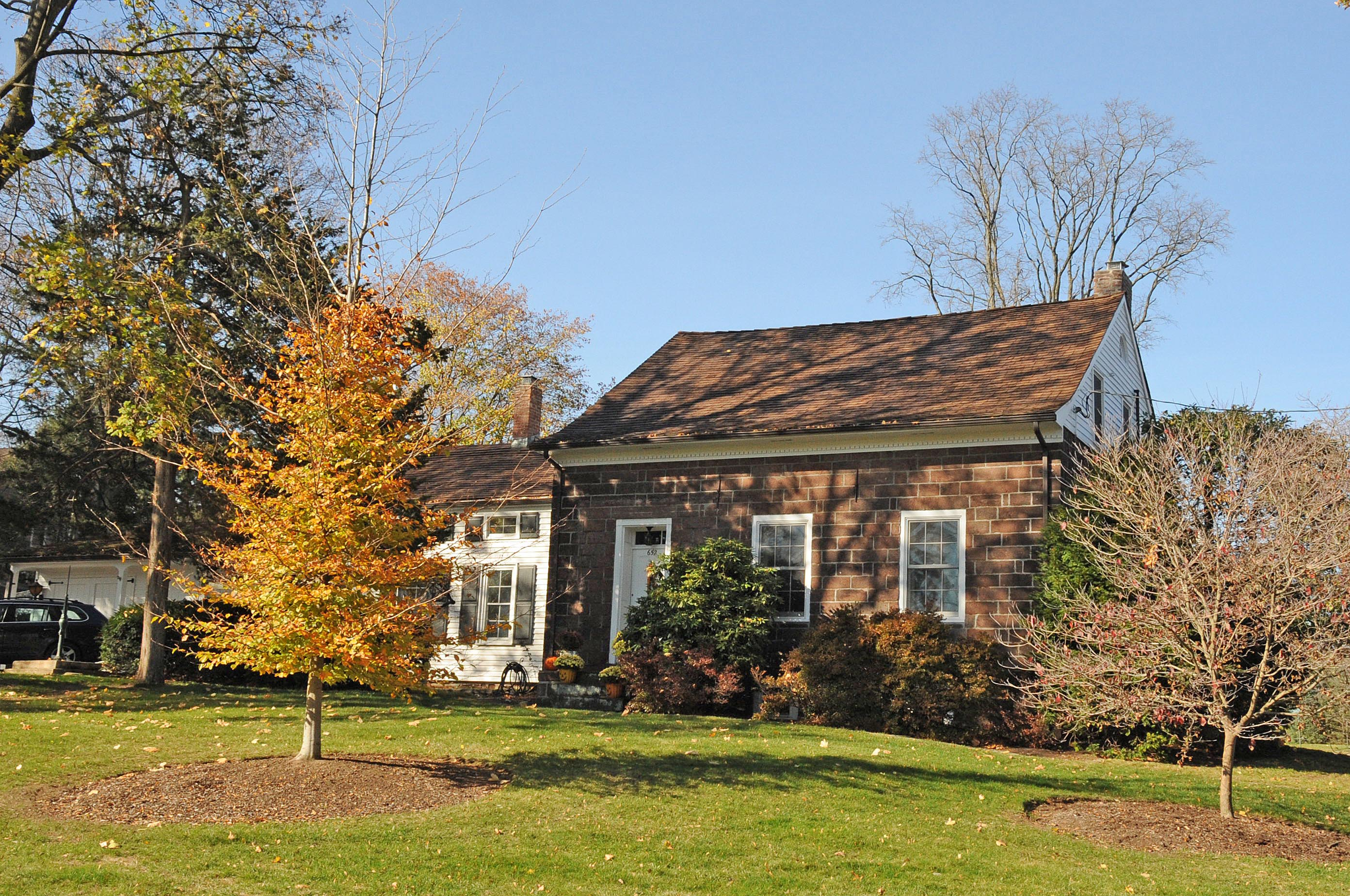

- Location within Bergen County, New Jersey Location within New Jersey Location within the United States
- Location: 652 Ackerman Avenue, Glen Rock, New Jersey
- Coordinates: 40°57′38.5″N 74°06′58.5″W
- MPS: Stone Houses of Bergen County TR
- NRHP reference No.: 83001455
- NJRHP No.: 514

Significant dates
- Added to NRHP: January 9, 1983
- Designated NJRHP: October 3, 1980

The Ackerman–Hopper House is located at 652 Ackerman Avenue in the borough of Glen Rock in Bergen County, New Jersey, United States. The historic stone house was added to the National Register of Historic Places on January 9, 1983, for its significance in architecture. It was listed as part of the Early Stone Houses of Bergen County Multiple Property Submission (MPS).

According to the nomination form, the house was built between 1760 and 1803 by Jacob Ackerman. In 1803, it was purchased by Henry P. Hopper, who had married Elizabeth Ackerman. His son, Peter H. Hopper, inherited the house in 1870.

== See also ==
- National Register of Historic Places listings in Bergen County, New Jersey
