= John Hopper House =

Historic house in New Jersey, United States

- U.S. National Register of Historic Places
- New Jersey Register of Historic Places
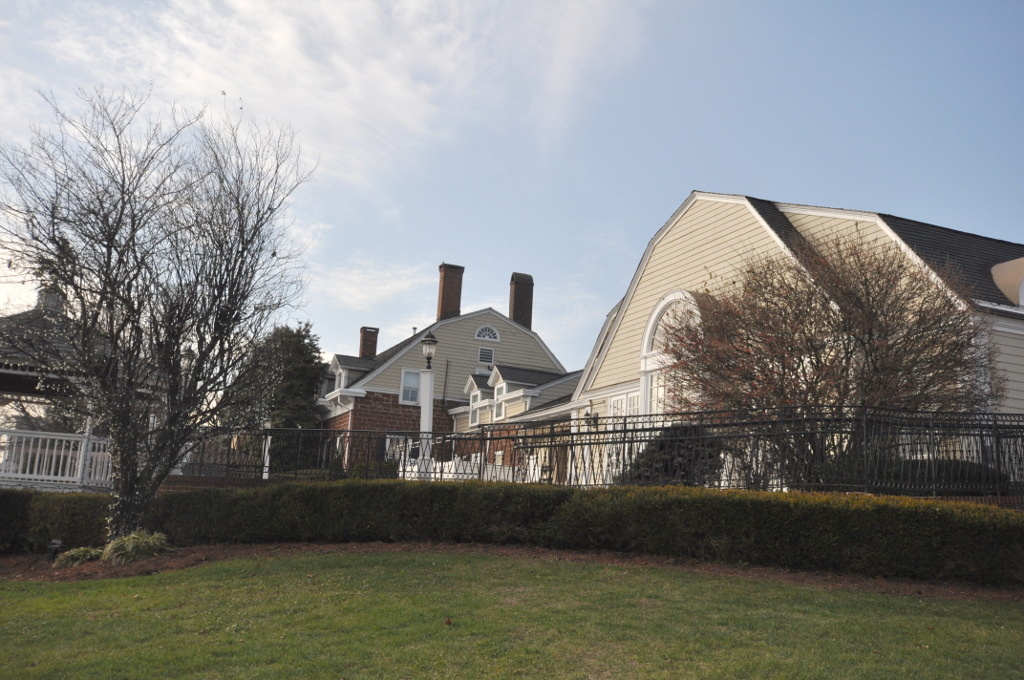
- 2018

- Location within Bergen County, New Jersey Location within New Jersey Location within the United States
- Location: 231 Polifly Road, Hackensack, New Jersey
- Coordinates: 40°52′30″N 74°3′41″W
- Built: 1818
- Architect: John I. Hopper
- MPS: Stone Houses of Bergen County TR
- NRHP reference No.: 83001527
- NJRHP No.: 524

Significant dates
- Added to NRHP: January 9, 1983
- Designated NJRHP: October 3, 1980

The John Hopper House is located at 231 Polifly Road in the city of Hackensack in Bergen County, New Jersey, United States. The stone house was built in 1818 by John I. Hopper. It was documented by the Historic American Buildings Survey (HABS) in 1937. The house was added to the National Register of Historic Places on January 9, 1983, for its significance in architecture. It was listed as part of the Early Stone Houses of Bergen County Multiple Property Submission (MPS). It has been used as a restaurant, the Stony Hill Inn, since 1937.

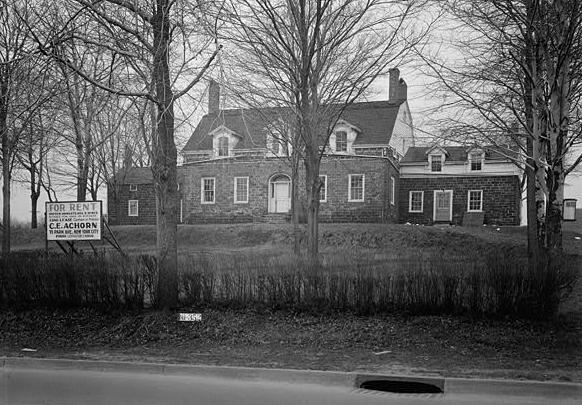
HABS photo from 1937

== See also ==
- National Register of Historic Places listings in Bergen County, New Jersey
