= Hopper–Goetschius House =

Historic house in New Jersey, United States

- U.S. National Register of Historic Places
- New Jersey Register of Historic Places
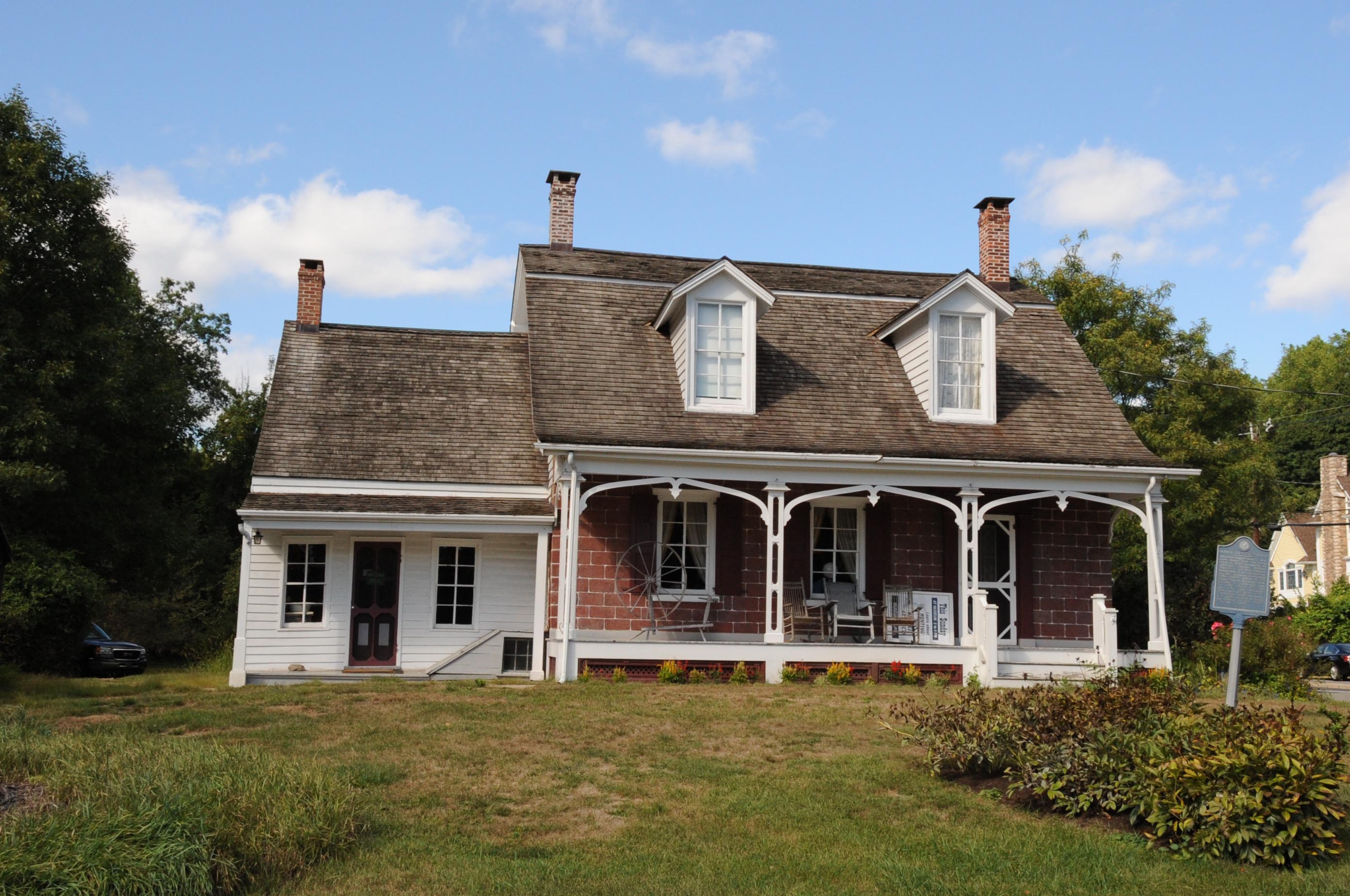
- Hopper–Goetschius House

- Location within Bergen County, New Jersey Location within New Jersey Location within the United States
- Location: 363 East Saddle River Road, Upper Saddle River, New Jersey
- Coordinates: 41°3′31″N 74°5′34″W
- Area: 2.5 acres (1.0 ha)
- Built: c. 1739
- Architect: Abraham Hopper
- MPS: Stone Houses of Bergen County TR
- NRHP reference No.: 83001523
- NJRHP No.: 711

Significant dates
- Added to NRHP: January 10, 1983
- Designated NJRHP: October 3, 1980

The Hopper–Goetschius House is located at 363 East Saddle River Road in the borough of Upper Saddle River in Bergen County, New Jersey, United States. It was added to the National Register of Historic Places on January 10, 1983, for its significance in architecture and exploration/settlement. It was listed as part of the Early Stone Houses of Bergen County Multiple Property Submission (MPS).

The house was built around 1739 by Abraham Hopper and sold to Rev. Stephen Goetschius in 1814. It remained in the Goetschius family until 1985 when the house was given to the borough of Upper Saddle River. The Upper Saddle River Historical Society now uses the house as a museum.

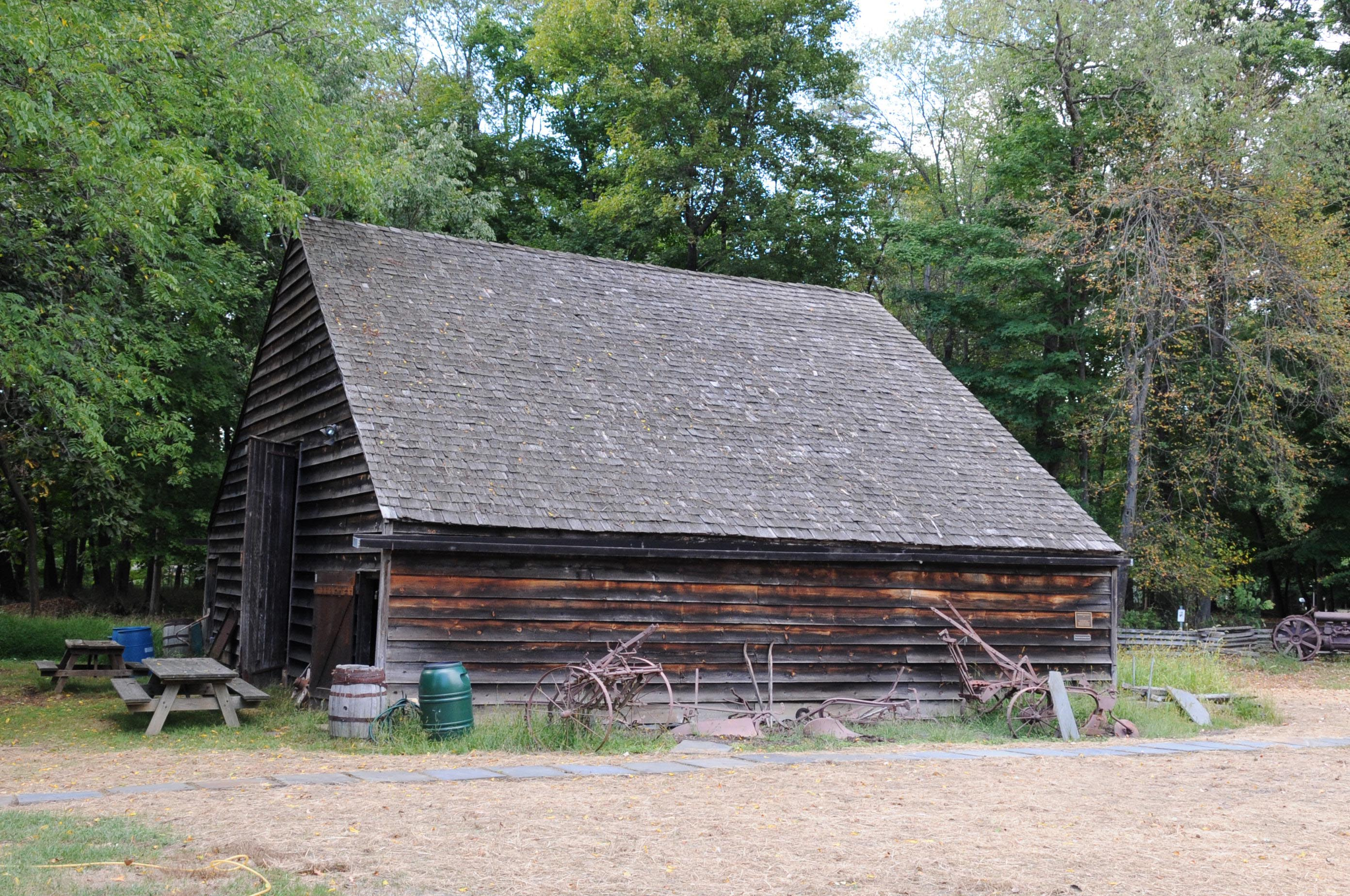
Van Ripper–Tice Barn on site

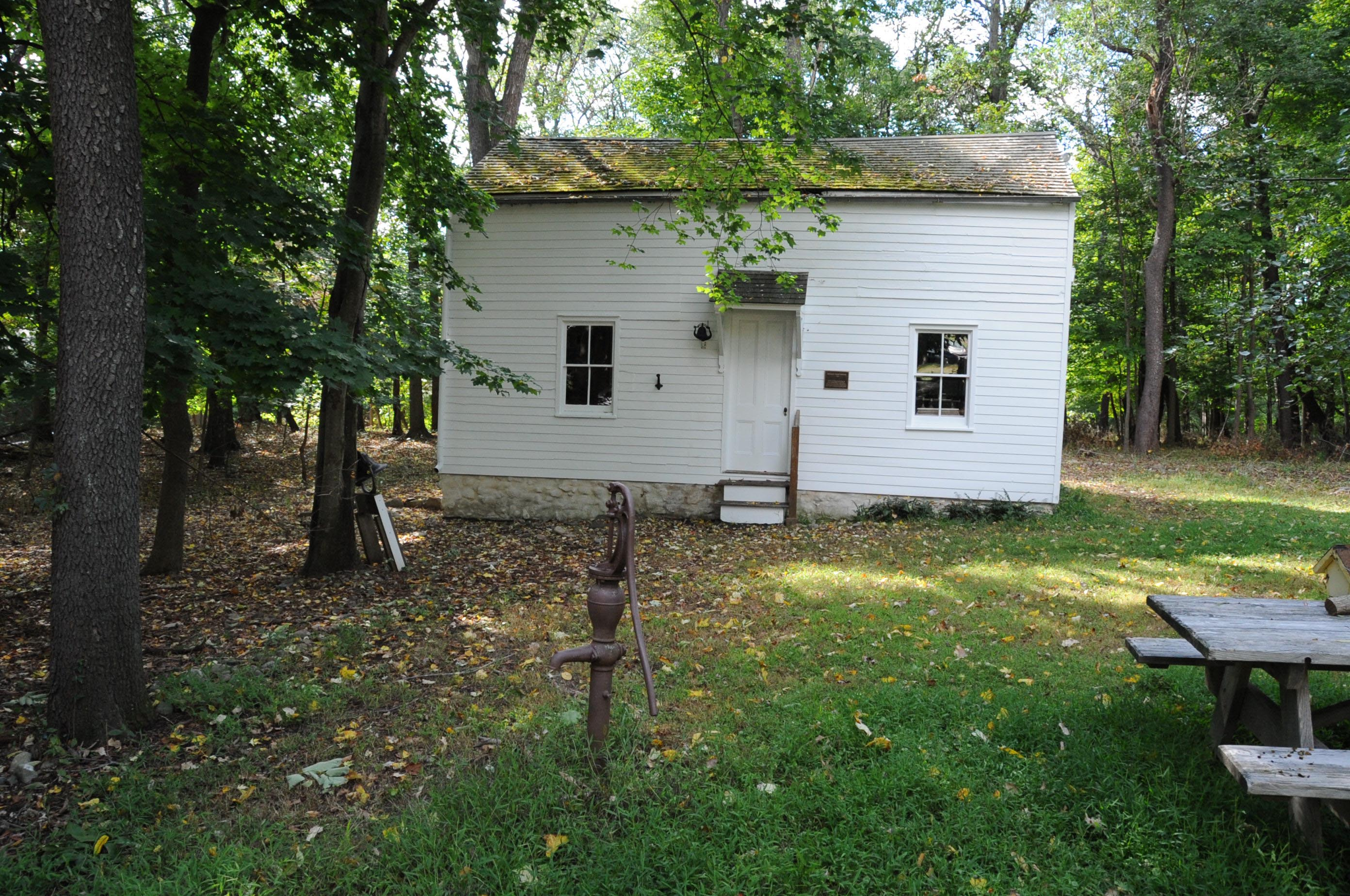
Ramsey–Sayer House on site

== See also ==
- National Register of Historic Places listings in Bergen County, New Jersey
