= Garret Hopper House =

- U.S. National Register of Historic Places
- New Jersey Register of Historic Places
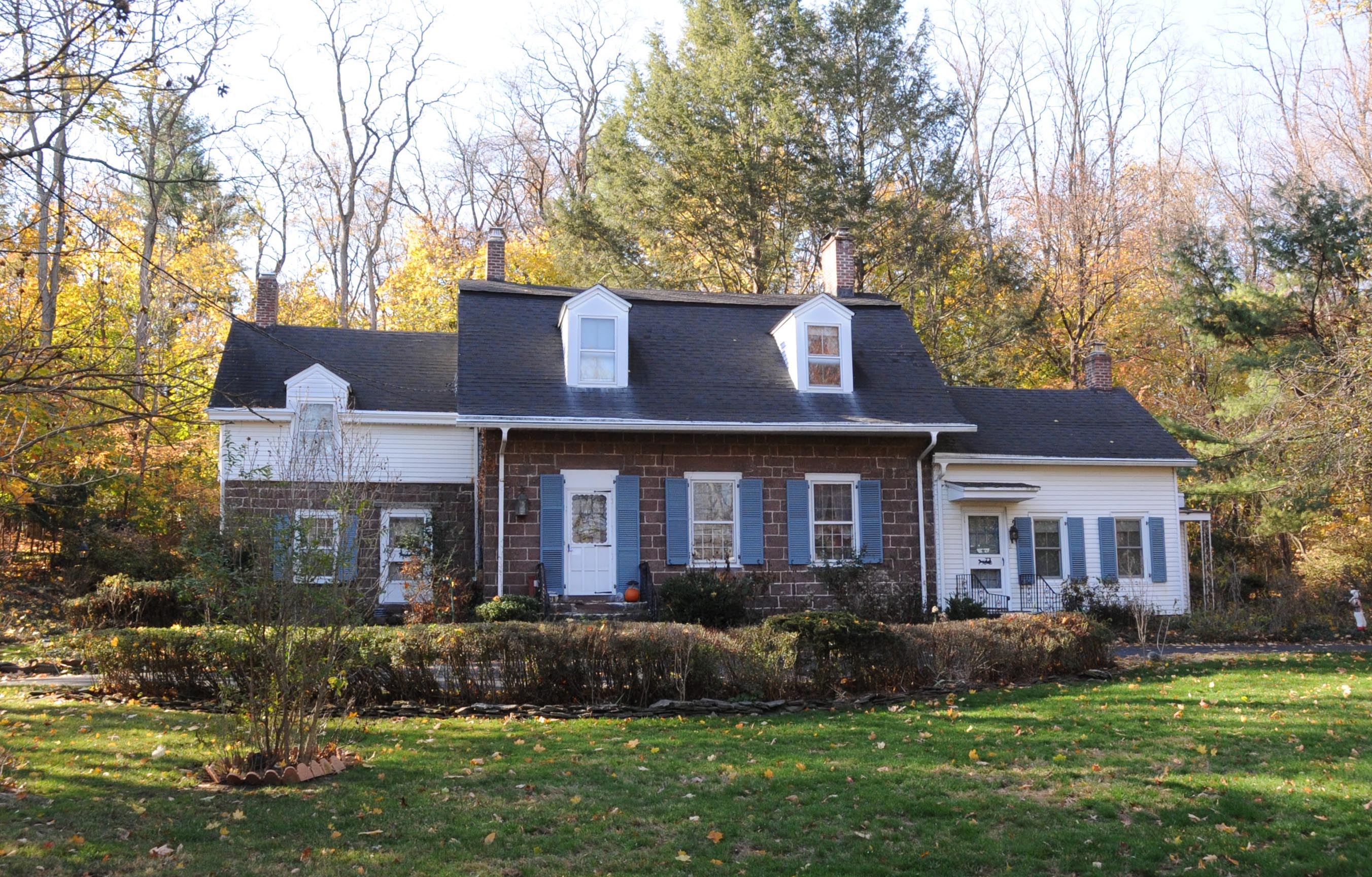

- Location within Bergen County, New Jersey Location within New Jersey Location within the United States
- Location: 470 Prospect Street, Glen Rock, New Jersey
- Coordinates: 40°57′57.5″N 74°06′50″W
- Built by: Garret Hopper
- MPS: Stone Houses of Bergen County TR
- NRHP reference No.: 83001522
- NJRHP No.: 516

Significant dates
- Added to NRHP: January 9, 1983
- Designated NJRHP: October 3, 1980

The Garret Hopper House is located at 470 Prospect Street in the borough of Glen Rock in Bergen County, New Jersey, United States. The historic stone house was added to the National Register of Historic Places on January 9, 1983, for its significance in architecture. It was listed as part of the Early Stone Houses of Bergen County Multiple Property Submission (MPS). According to the nomination form, the oldest part of the house was built around 1760, while the main section was probably built by Garret Hopper around 1790 to 1825, based on architectural evidence.
