= Hopper–Van Horn House =

Historic house in New Jersey, United States

- U.S. National Register of Historic Places
- New Jersey Register of Historic Places
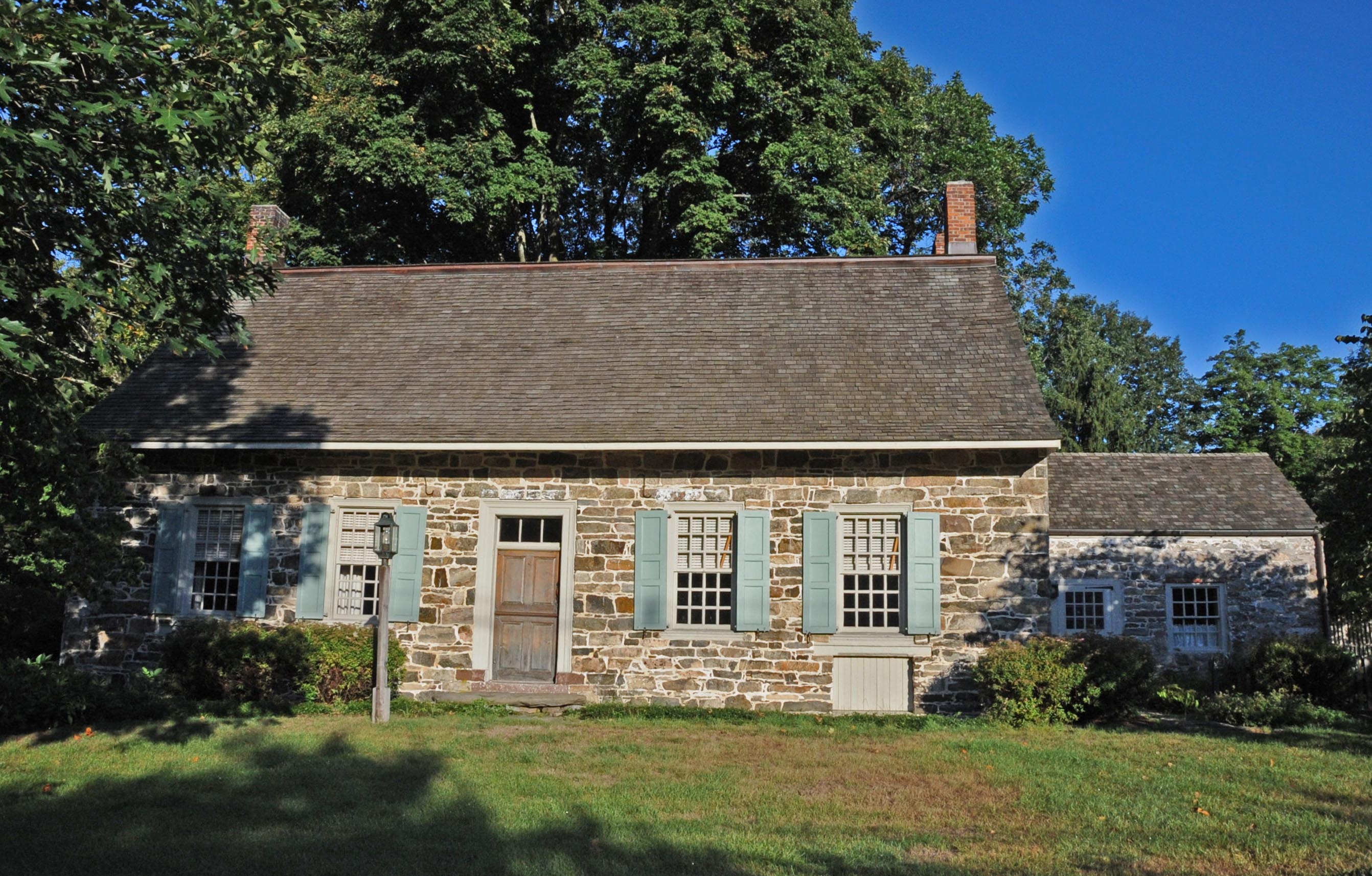

- Location within Bergen County, New Jersey Location within New Jersey Location within the United States
- Location: 398 Ramapo Valley Road, Mahwah, New Jersey
- Coordinates: 41°5′19″N 74°10′22″W
- Area: 3.5 acres (1.4 ha)
- Built: 1769
- Architectural style: Colonial, Dutch Colonial
- MPS: Stone Houses of Bergen County TR
- NRHP reference No.: 73001079
- NJRHP No.: 566

Significant dates
- Added to NRHP: April 11, 1973
- Designated NJRHP: March 17, 1972

The Hopper–Van Horn House is located at 398 Ramapo Valley Road in the township of Mahwah in Bergen County, New Jersey, United States. The historic stone house was built in 1769. It was documented by the Historic American Buildings Survey (HABS) in 1937 and was added to the National Register of Historic Places on April 11, 1973, for its significance in architecture and exploration/settlement. It was listed as part of the Early Stone Houses of Bergen County Multiple Property Submission (MPS). Prior to being owned by the Van Horns, the land was owned and lived on by Rachel Bayard and Lucus Kiersted, who used it as a trading post. Prior to that, there is evidence of occupation by Native Americans.

== History ==
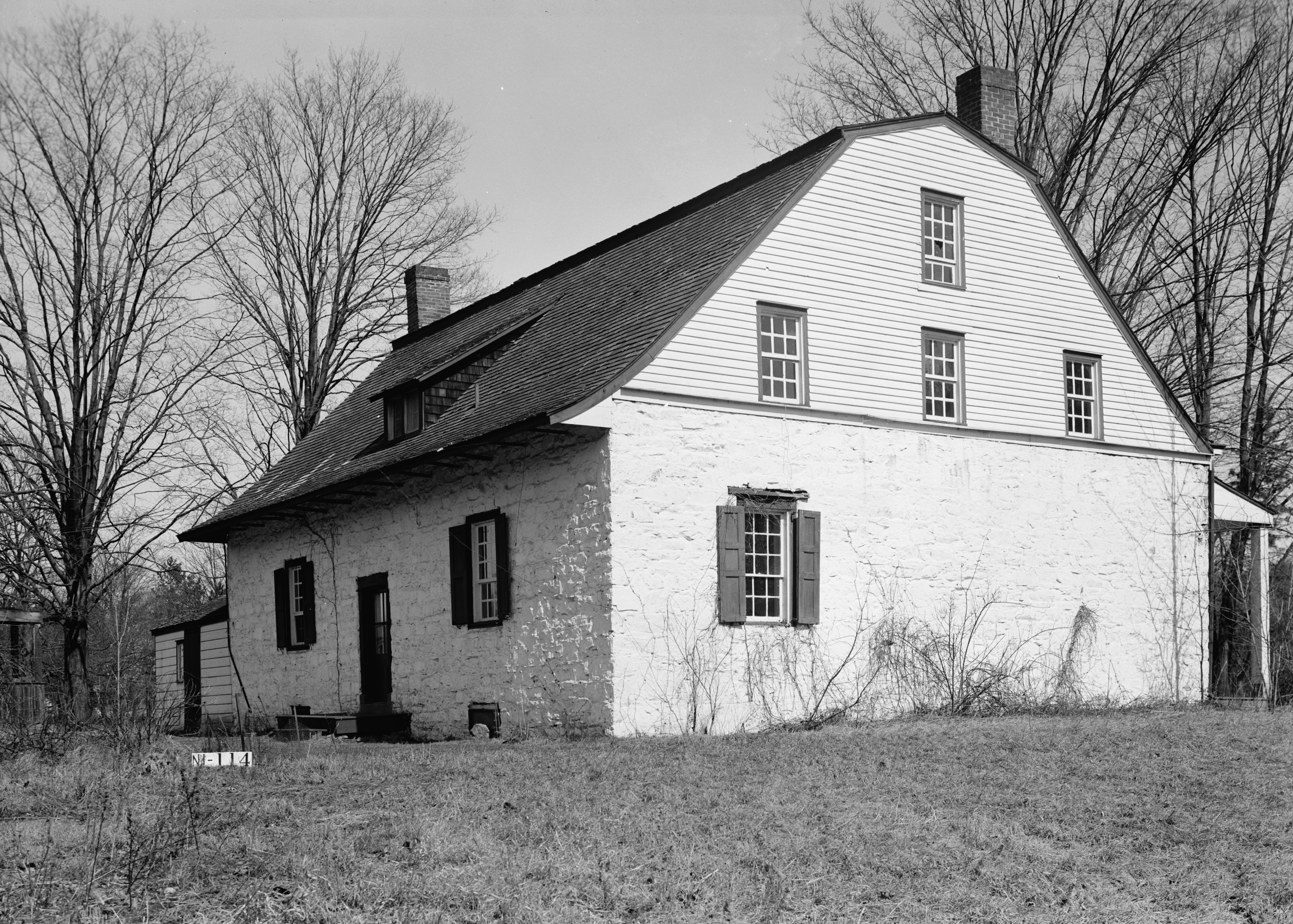
HABS image from 1937

=== History of the Owners: 1700–1849 ===
On August 10, 1700, Blandina Bayard purchased a plot of land measuring 16 miles by 12 miles from local Hackensack Indians. At this time, Blandina believed the land to be in the Colony of New York. It was here that she established a stone cottage trading post, which made her one of the first women entrepreneurs in New Jersey. Upon her death in 1711, her will was probated and the land was granted to her daughter-in-law, Rachel Bayard. The Bayard Family joined into a company with the Laroe and Kiersted families who were familiar with the area. In 1725, the patents to the land was deemed invalid and the Kiersteds and the Laroes were tied up in negotiations until 1743. Upon the settlement, Kiersted sold his land to Hendrick Laroe, who purchased it for his son Jacobus Laroe. In 1750, Jacobus built the current structure known as the Laroe-Vanhorn House. In 1765, Jacobus sold the house and property to Isaac Bogert. Over the next few decades, the house and land would change hands a number of times.

- 1785: Jacon Bogert sells farm to Cornelius Haring.
- 1788: Cornelius Haring sold the land to Judge John Haring
- 1796: John Haring sold the property to Judge Henry Van Dalsem
- 1805: Judge Henry Van Dalsem sold the land to Roelif Verbryck
- 1806: Roelif Verbryck sold the land to Abraham Hopper.
- 1823: Abraham Hopper died (1820) and his widow sold the house to her son-in-law, John G. Hopper and his father, Garret W. Hopper
- 1841: Garrett I. Hopper purchased the land from his mother.
- 1849: Garrett I. Hopper sold the land to his Aunt Margaret and her husband, Abram Van Horn.

== Owners of the Laroe-Van Horn House 1700–Present ==
1700–1709	Indian trading post, Dwelling built by Blandina Bayard. Rachel Bayard and Lucas Kierste, Indian traders
1703–1743	Residence and farm lived on by Lucas and Jannetje Kiersted
1743–1765	Residence and farm lived on by Jacobus and Rebecca Laroe. New stone house constructed in 1750
1765–1784	Residence and farm of Jacob Isaac Bogert
1784–1788	Residence and farm of Cornelius Haring
1788–1796	Residence and farm of Judge John Haring
1796–1805	Residence and farm of Judge Henry Van Dalsem
1805–1806	Residence and farm of Roelif Verbryck
1806–1823	Residence and farm of the Abraham Hopper family
1823–1841	Residence and farm of the family of John G. Hopper
1841–1849	Residence and farm of Garrett I. Hopper
1849–1872	Residence and farm of Abram Van Horn
1849–1872	Residence and farm of Abram Van Horn
1872–1889	Residence and Farm William Van Horn
1889–1917	Part of Theodore A Havemeyer estate
1917–1972	Herdsmen's House for Marapo Farms
1972–1979	Ramapo College President's Residence
1979–1989	Ramapo College Environmental Studies Program Student Housing
1980	Ramapo College archaeological field school site
1989–2014	Residence of Bryant and Joan Malcolm
2014–Present	Bought by Anne-Lise Jacobsen

=== History of the Owners: 1849–Present ===
In 1889, Havemeyer purchased the Laroe Van Horn House from William Van Horn. The house was to be used as part of his estate Mountainside Farm and it housed workers who worked on the estate. While Havemeyer lived in the house, he added a new roof. The In 1917, Havemeyer sold the house to Stephen Birch of Marapo Farms and used it to house the herdsmen who worked on the farm. The House became state property in 1972 and housed the President of Ramapo College, which was originally part of the Havemeyers Mountainside Farm. George Potter was the first and only President of Ramapo College to reside in the Laroe Van Horn house. In 1980, the Laroe Van Horn house housed students at Ramapo College for the Environmental Studies Program. In 1989 was purchased by Byrant and Joan Malcolm. A restrictive covenant was attached to the deed, the house had to be preserved and maintained in accordance with the recommended approaches Interiors Standards for Rehabilitations. Any changes to the house needed approved in writing by the Commissioner of the Department of Environmental Protection. In 2014, they sold the house to Anne-Lise Jacobsen.

== Grave Site ==
Behind the Hopper–Van Horn House a family graveyard. In 2012 Ramapo College adjunct professor Jeff Williamson excavated another gravesite further back in the woods that he believed to contain the unmarked graves of slaves and freedmen that used to work the land.

== Archaeology ==
In June 1980, students of Ramapo College were involved in an archaeological dig on the site. They excavated about 13,000 artifacts which helped corroborate information about the house's history and inhabitants. They were able to find artifacts dating back to the early period of habitation, including when the area was a trading post. They were also able to find extensive evidence of the presence of a local tribe prior to European claiming of the site. The collection is currently housed at the Mahwah Museum.

== See also ==
- National Register of Historic Places listings in Bergen County, New Jersey
