= Terhune–Hopper House (Upper Saddle River, New Jersey) =

- U.S. National Register of Historic Places
- New Jersey Register of Historic Places
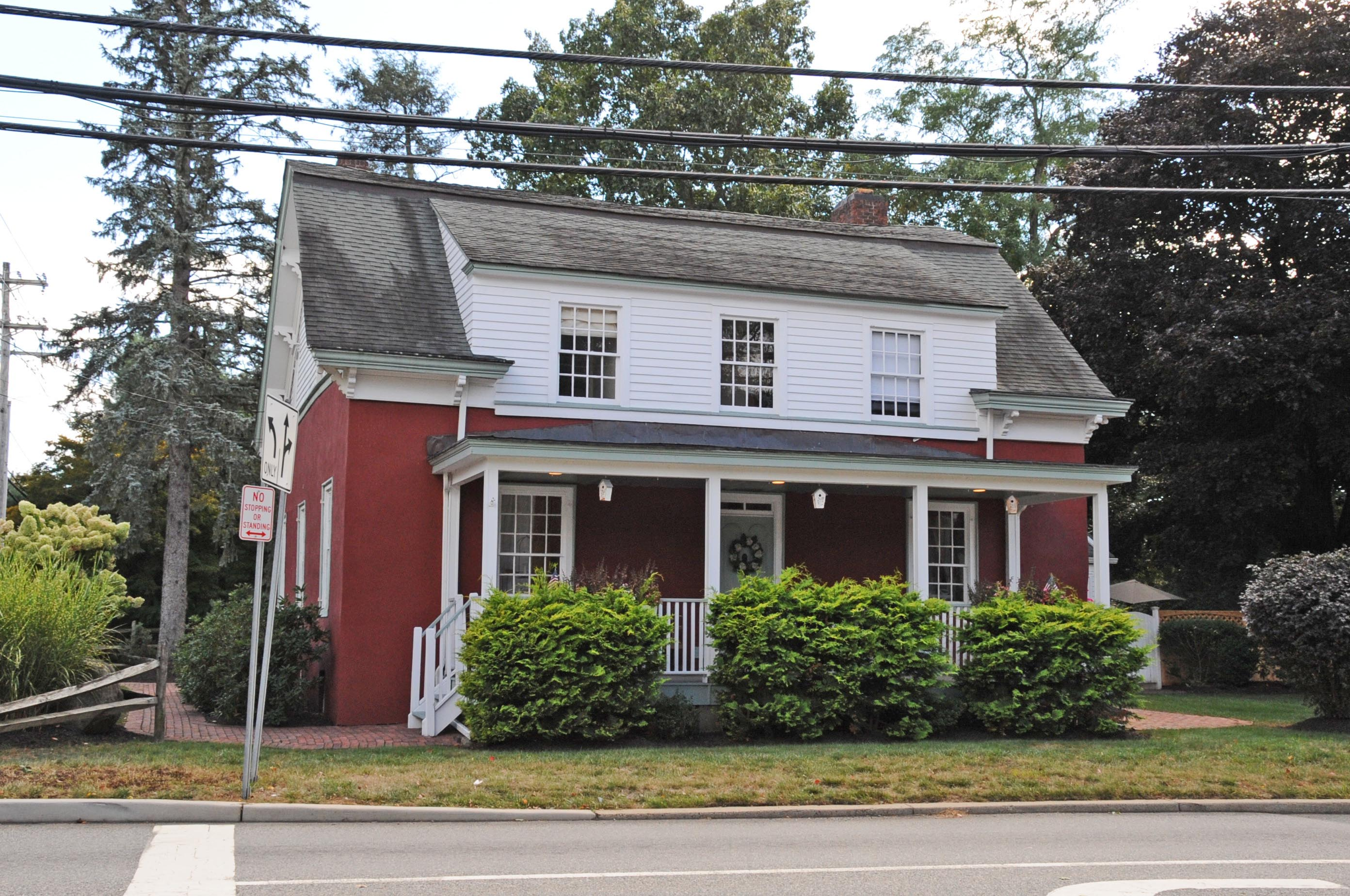

- Location within Bergen County, New Jersey Location within New Jersey Location within the United States
- Location: 349 West Saddle River Road, Upper Saddle River, New Jersey
- Coordinates: 41°03′30″N 74°05′56″W
- Area: 10 acres (4.0 ha)
- Built: c. 1781
- MPS: Stone Houses of Bergen County TR
- NRHP reference No.: 83001553
- NJRHP No.: 713

Significant dates
- Added to NRHP: January 10, 1983
- Designated NJRHP: October 3, 1980

The Terhune–Hopper House is located at 349 West Saddle River Road in the borough of Upper Saddle River in Bergen County, New Jersey, United States. The historic stone house was built around 1781 by tradition, perhaps later by architectural evidence. It was added to the National Register of Historic Places on January 10, 1983, for its significance in architecture. It was listed as part of the Early Stone Houses of Bergen County Multiple Property Submission (MPS).

According to the nomination form, Albert Terhune bought 330 acres (130 ha) here in 1746. The house was left to his son, John Albert Terhune, and then to his son, Albert Terhune. The house next went to his brother Harmon Terhune, and then his sister Elizabeth Terhune, who married John Eckerson Hopper, listed as the owner in 1846.

== See also ==
- National Register of Historic Places listings in Bergen County, New Jersey
