= Terhune–Hopper House (Ho-Ho-Kus, New Jersey) =

- U.S. National Register of Historic Places
- New Jersey Register of Historic Places
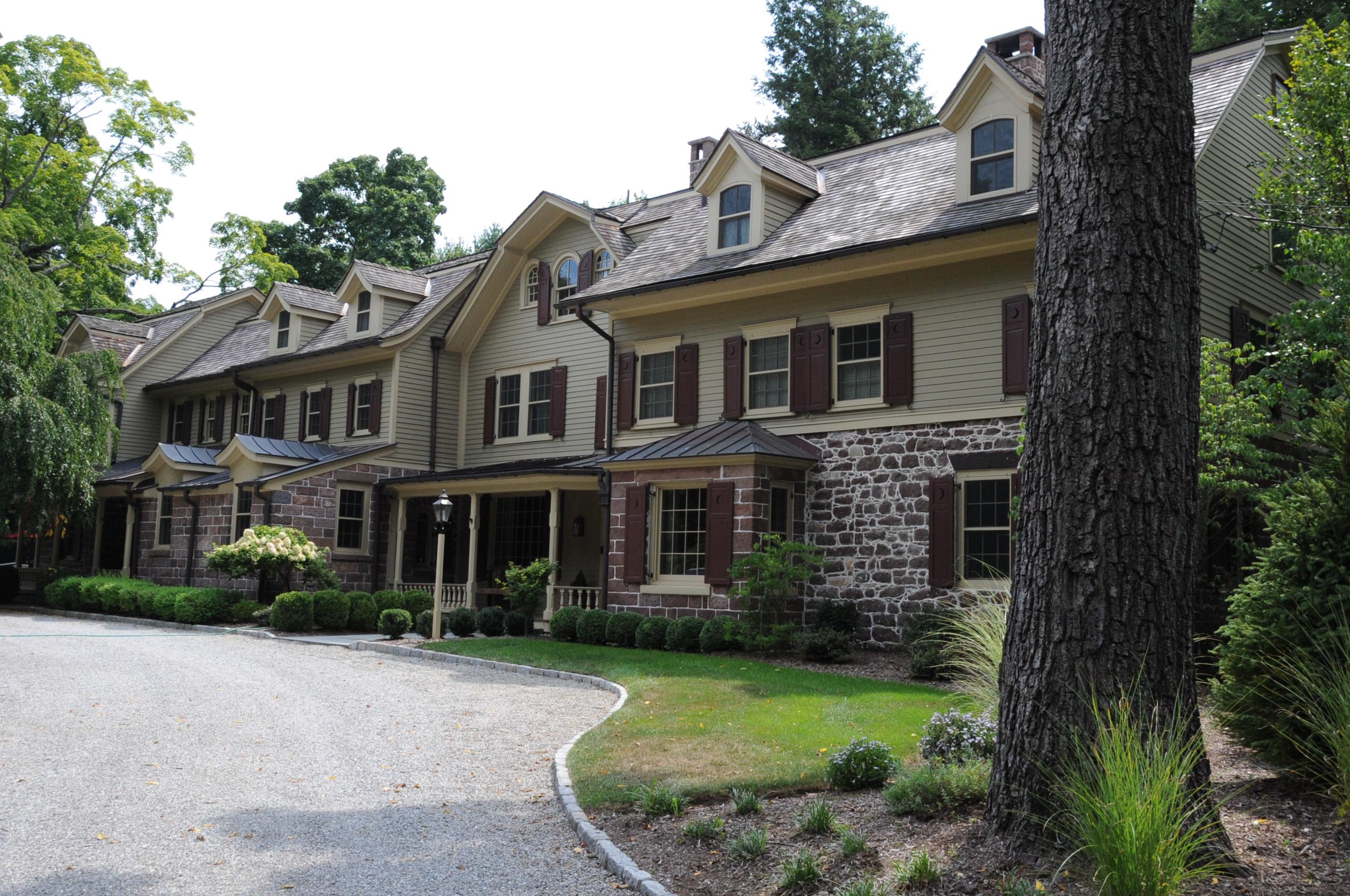

- Location within Bergen County, New Jersey Location within New Jersey Location within the United States
- Location: 825 East Saddle River Road, Ho-Ho-Kus, New Jersey
- Coordinates: 40°59′51″N 74°05′30″W
- Area: 1.6 acres (0.65 ha)
- Built: 1790
- MPS: Stone Houses of Bergen County TR
- NRHP reference No.: 83001554
- NJRHP No.: 541

Significant dates
- Added to NRHP: January 10, 1983
- Designated NJRHP: October 3, 1980

The Terhune–Hopper House is located at 825 East Saddle River Road in the borough of Ho-Ho-Kus in Bergen County, New Jersey, United States. The historic stone house was built in 1790 and was added to the National Register of Historic Places on January 10, 1983, for its significance in architecture. It was listed as part of the Early Stone Houses of Bergen County Multiple Property Submission (MPS).

According to the nomination form, the house may have built by Abraham Terhune, but more likely by his son, Albert Demarest Terhune. Hassel Garretson bought it in 1816, Peter D. Westervelt in 1839, and Jacob P. Hopper in 1854.

== See also ==
- National Register of Historic Places listings in Bergen County, New Jersey
