= Upper Saddle River, New Jersey =

Borough in Bergen County, New Jersey, US

- Borough
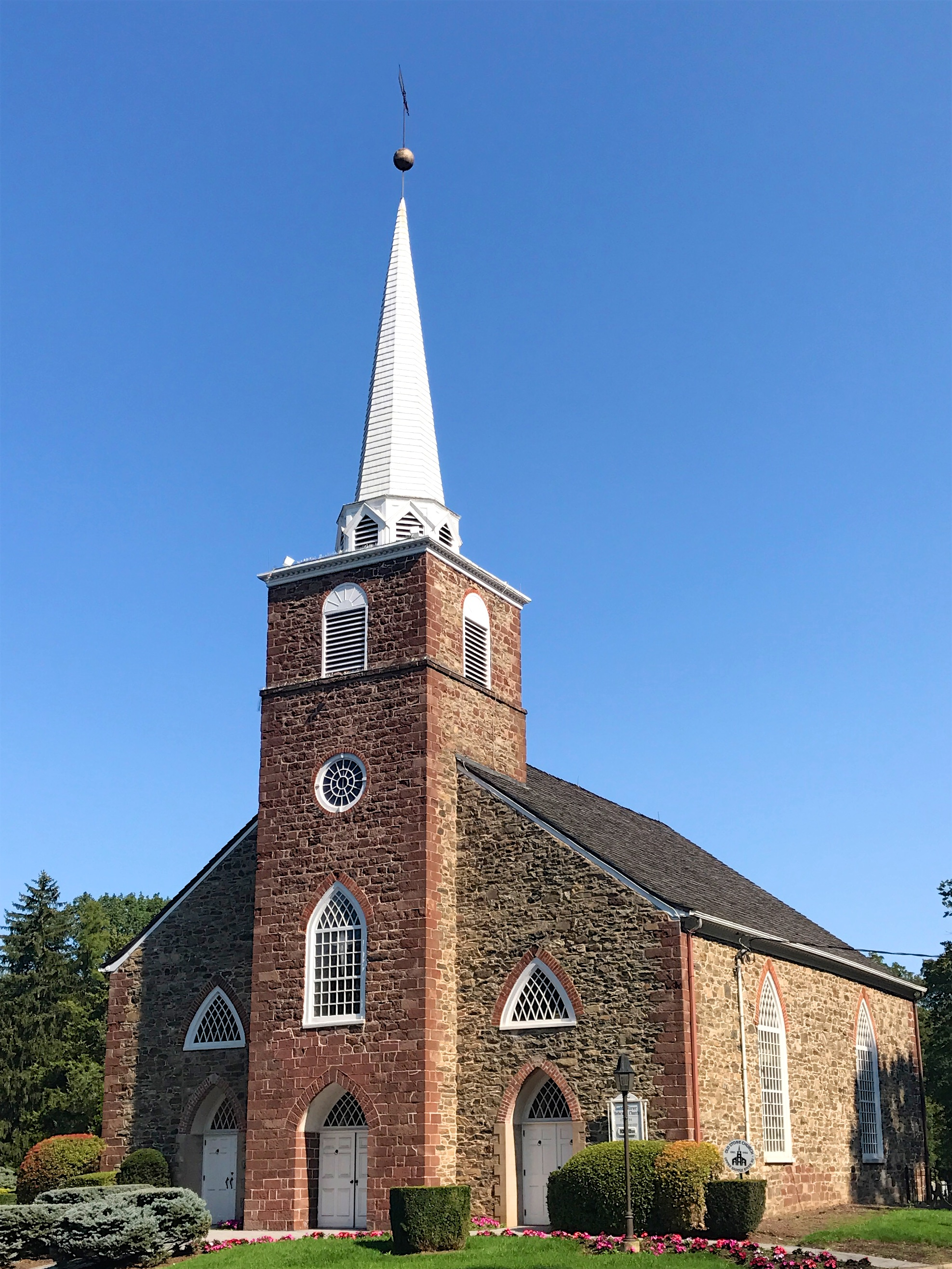
- Old Stone Church, listed on the National Register of Historic Places

- Seal

- Location of Upper Saddle River in Bergen County highlighted in red (left). Inset map: Location of Bergen County in New Jersey highlighted in orange (right).

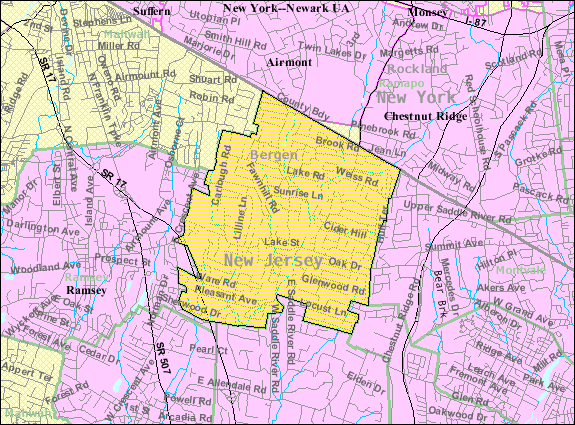
- Census Bureau map of Upper Saddle River, New Jersey

- Location in Bergen County Location in New Jersey Location in the United States
- Coordinates: 41.063162°N 74.099973°W
- Country: United States
- State: New Jersey
- County: Bergen
- Incorporated: November 22, 1894

Government
  - Type: Borough
  - Body: Borough Council
  - Mayor: Arman Fardanesh (R, term ends December 31, 2027)
  - Administrator: Theodore Preusch
  - Municipal clerk: Joy Convertini

Area
  - Total: 5.27 sq mi (13.66 km^{2})
  - Land: 5.25 sq mi (13.60 km^{2})
  - Water: 0.019 sq mi (0.05 km^{2}) 0.38%
  - Rank: 269th of 565 in state 10th of 70 in county
- Elevation: 259 ft (79 m)

Population (2020)
  - Total: 8,353
  - Estimate (2023): 8,480
  - Rank: 284th of 565 in state 49th of 70 in county
  - Density: 1,590.1/sq mi (613.9/km^{2})
  - Rank: 330th of 565 in state 63rd of 70 in county
- Time zone: UTC−05:00 (Eastern (EST))
  - Summer (DST): UTC−04:00 (Eastern (EDT))
- ZIP Code: 07458
- Area code: 201
- FIPS code: 3400375140
- GNIS feature ID: 0885425
- Website: www.usrtoday.org

Upper Saddle River is a borough in Bergen County, in the U.S. state of New Jersey. As of the 2020 United States census, the borough's population was 8,353, an increase of 145 (+1.8%) from the 2010 census count of 8,208, which in turn reflected an increase of 467 (+6.0%) from the 7,741 counted in the 2000 census.

Upper Saddle River had a per capita income of $73,639 and was ranked 20th in New Jersey based on data from the 2006–2010 American Community Survey (ACS) from the United States Census Bureau, more than double the statewide average of $34,858. In the 2013–2017 ACS, Upper Saddle River had a median household income of $176,674 (ranked 8th in the state) and included 42.9% of households earning more than $200,000 annually.

== History ==
Upper Saddle River was originally settled by the Lenape Native Americans and was colonized in the 18th century principally by Dutch settlers who built mills along the Saddle River. The area was granted borough status in 1894 and remained principally rural until the 1950s. The suburban growth of New Jersey included Upper Saddle River and surrounding municipalities, as the borough's population increased tenfold from 1950 to 1970. The population has remained fairly constant since 1970.

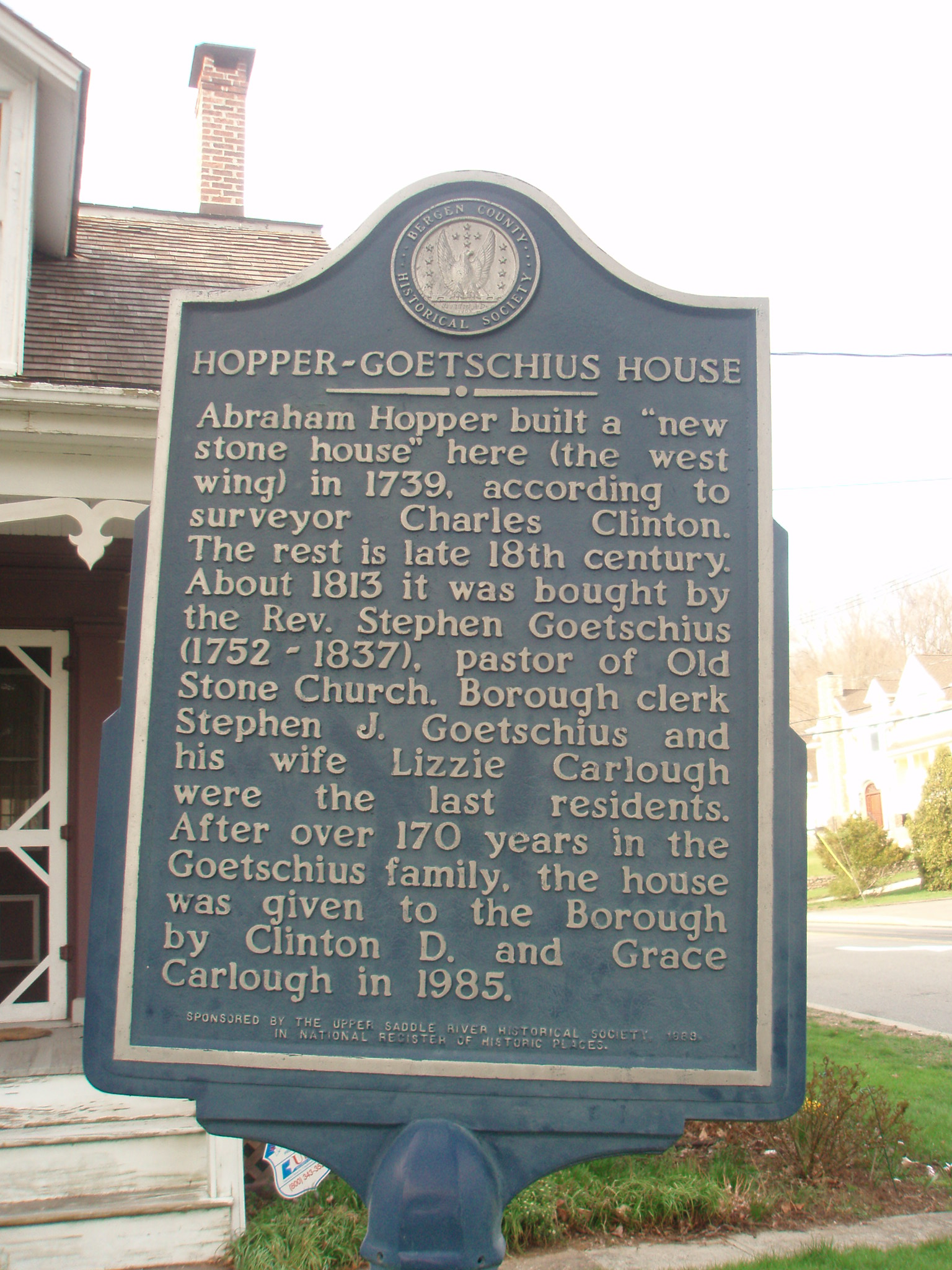
Hopper-Goetschius House Historic Marker in Upper Saddle River

Predominantly a residential community consisting of one-acre (4,000 m^{2}) lots, Upper Saddle River also contains a library, police station, fire station, ambulance corps, municipal hall, and three primary schools. Commerce and industry are concentrated along the town's western border along Route 17. Postal service is shared with the neighboring borough of Saddle River.

Upper Saddle River was formed as a borough by an act of the New Jersey Legislature on November 22, 1894, from portions of Hohokus Township and Orvil Township, based on the results of a referendum held two days earlier. The borough was formed during the "Boroughitis" phenomenon then sweeping through Bergen County, in which 26 boroughs were formed in the county in 1894 alone. Upper Saddle River's referendum passed on November 20, one day after the referendum passed for Saddle River. The name of the river, and hence the borough, is thought to come from early explorers who thought that the geography of the area resembled that of the Sadle Burn, the valley surrounding a stream in the Scottish area of Argyll.

== Geography ==
According to the United States Census Bureau, the borough had a total area of 5.27 square miles (13.66 km^{2}), including 5.25 square miles (13.60 km^{2}) of land and 0.02 square miles (0.05 km^{2}) of water (0.38%). The borough is bisected by the Saddle River, a tributary of the Passaic River.

Unincorporated communities, localities and place names located partially or completely within the township include Duffys Mills, Hoppers Mills and Posts Mills.

Upper Saddle River is bounded by seven municipalities: Mahwah, Montvale, Ramsey, Saddle River, as well as small portions of Woodcliff Lake in Bergen County, New Jersey; and both Airmont and Chestnut Ridge in the Town of Ramapo in Rockland County, New York.

The borough is served by several major highways, including the Garden State Parkway at exits 172 and 171 in Montvale and Woodcliff Lake, and Route 17, which runs through the borough, though some portions of Upper Saddle River are served by roads located in Saddle River, Ramsey and Mahwah.

== Demographics ==
Historical population
Census	Pop.	Note	%±
1900	326		—
1910	273		−16.3%
1920	251		−8.1%
1930	347		38.2%
1940	510		47.0%
1950	706		38.4%
1960	3,570		405.7%
1970	7,949		122.7%
1980	7,958		0.1%
1990	7,198		−9.6%
2000	7,741		7.5%
2010	8,208		6.0%
2020	8,353		1.8%
2023 (est.)	8,480	▲	1.5%
Population sources: 1900–1920 1910; 1910–1930 1900–2020; 2000 2010 2020

=== Racial and ethnic composition ===
Upper Saddle River borough, New Jersey – Racial and ethnic composition Note: the US Census treats Hispanic/Latino as an ethnic category. This table excludes Latinos from the racial categories and assigns them to a separate category. Hispanics/Latinos may be of any race.
Race / Ethnicity (NH = Non-Hispanic)	Pop 2000	Pop 2010	Pop 2020	% 2000	% 2010	% 2020
White alone (NH)	6,936	6,809	6,120	89.60%	82.96%	73.27%
Black or African American alone (NH)	72	108	129	0.93%	1.32%	1.54%
Native American or Alaska Native alone (NH)	1	10	1	0.01%	0.12%	0.01%
Asian alone (NH)	484	822	1,240	6.25%	10.01%	14.84%
Native Hawaiian or Pacific Islander alone (NH)	1	1	1	0.01%	0.01%	0.01%
Other race alone (NH)	13	11	33	0.17%	0.13%	0.40%
Mixed race or Multiracial (NH)	65	92	250	0.84%	1.12%	2.99%
Hispanic or Latino (any race)	169	355	579	2.18%	4.33%	6.93%
Total	7,741	8,208	8,353	100.00%	100.00%	100.00%

=== 2020 census ===
As of the 2020 census, Upper Saddle River had a population of 8,353. The median age was 44.2 years. 25.2% of residents were under the age of 18 and 16.3% of residents were 65 years of age or older. For every 100 females there were 95.2 males, and for every 100 females age 18 and over there were 94.8 males age 18 and over.

100.0% of residents lived in urban areas, while 0.0% lived in rural areas.

There were 2,658 households in Upper Saddle River, of which 43.1% had children under the age of 18 living in them. Of all households, 75.7% were married-couple households, 8.1% were households with a male householder and no spouse or partner present, and 13.2% were households with a female householder and no spouse or partner present. About 10.9% of all households were made up of individuals and 6.1% had someone living alone who was 65 years of age or older.

There were 2,785 housing units, of which 4.6% were vacant. The homeowner vacancy rate was 1.3% and the rental vacancy rate was 5.1%.

=== 2010 census ===
The 2010 United States census counted 8,208 people, 2,639 households, and 2,299 families in the borough. The population density was 1,560.0 per square mile (602.3/km^{2}). There were 2,776 housing units at an average density of 527.6 per square mile (203.7/km^{2}). The racial makeup was 86.55% (7,104) White, 1.44% (118) Black or African American, 0.13% (11) Native American, 10.09% (828) Asian, 0.01% (1) Pacific Islander, 0.48% (39) from other races, and 1.30% (107) from two or more races. Hispanic or Latino of any race were 4.33% (355) of the population.

Of the 2,639 households, 48.1% had children under the age of 18; 78.3% were married couples living together; 6.2% had a female householder with no husband present and 12.9% were non-families. Of all households, 10.7% were made up of individuals and 5.5% had someone living alone who was 65 years of age or older. The average household size was 3.11 and the average family size was 3.37.

30.6% of the population were under the age of 18, 5.3% from 18 to 24, 18.0% from 25 to 44, 32.9% from 45 to 64, and 13.1% who were 65 years of age or older. The median age was 42.9 years. For every 100 females, the population had 96.1 males. For every 100 females ages 18 and older there were 93.8 males.

The Census Bureau's 2006–2010 American Community Survey showed that (in 2010 inflation-adjusted dollars) median household income was $175,399 (with a margin of error of +/− $22,259) and the median family income was $179,241 (+/− $47,207). Males had a median income of $160,795 (+/− $24,471) versus $67,885 (+/− $27,436) for females. The per capita income for the borough was $73,639 (+/− $8,085). About 1.5% of families and 1.4% of the population were below the poverty line, including 1.4% of those under age 18 and 1.5% of those age 65 or over.

Same-sex couples headed 13 households in 2010, an increase from the 12 counted in 2000.

=== 2000 census ===
As of the 2000 United States census there were 7,741 people, 2,497 households, and 2,242 families residing in the borough. The population density was 1,462.7 inhabitants per square mile (564.8/km^{2}). There were 2,560 housing units at an average density of 483.7 per square mile (186.8/km^{2}). The racial makeup of the borough was 91.24% White, 0.93% African American, 0.03% Native American, 6.28% Asian, 0.01% Pacific Islander, 0.52% from other races, and 0.99% from two or more races. Hispanic or Latino of any race were 2.18% of the population.

There were 2,497 households, out of which 47.1% had children under the age of 18 living with them, 83.6% were married couples living together, 4.4% had a female householder with no husband present, and 10.2% were non-families. 8.4% of all households were made up of individuals, and 3.9% had someone living alone who was 65 years of age or older. The average household size was 3.09 and the average family size was 3.27.

In the borough the population was spread out, with 30.7% under the age of 18, 3.8% from 18 to 24, 25.1% from 25 to 44, 29.0% from 45 to 64, and 11.4% who were 65 years of age or older. The median age was 40 years. For every 100 females, there were 97.1 males. For every 100 females age 18 and over, there were 95.0 males.

The median income for a household in the borough was $127,635, and the median income for a family was $132,401. Males had a median income of $100,000 versus $51,587 for females. The per capita income for the borough was $57,239. None of the families and 0.7% of the population were living below the poverty line, including no under eighteens and 2.1% of those over 64.

== Economy ==
The North American headquarters of Hunter Douglas are located in the borough.

Pearson Education (formerly Prentice Hall), a scholastic division of Pearson, which had employed 1,400 at its location in Upper Saddle River, left the borough at the end of 2014, when the company relocated to offices in Hoboken and Manhattan.

== Parks and recreation ==
Parks in the borough include:

- Hess Park – located on Hess Court, the park has athletic fields and a playground
- Lions Memorial Park – located on Lake Street, this park has athletic playing fields, walking paths, and a playground. This park was built and funded by the Saddle River Valley Lions Club. The park is also home to the annual Saddle River Valley Lions Club carnival; held every year on Memorial Day weekend.
- Liberty Pond Park – located on Hopper Farm Road, this park has a gazebo and swing benches, as guests view the West Branch Saddle River pond.

== Government ==
=== Local government ===
Upper Saddle River is governed under the borough form of New Jersey municipal government, which is used in 218 municipalities (of the 564) statewide, making it the most common form of government in New Jersey. The governing body is comprised of a mayor and a borough council, with all positions elected at-large. A mayor is elected directly by the voters to a four-year term of office. The borough council includes six members elected to serve three-year terms on a staggered basis, with two seats coming up for election each year in a three-year cycle. The borough form of government used by Upper Saddle River is a "weak mayor / strong council" government in which council members act as the legislative body with the mayor presiding at meetings and voting only in the event of a tie. The mayor can veto ordinances subject to an override by a two-thirds majority vote of the council. The mayor makes committee and liaison assignments for council members, and most appointments are made by the mayor with the advice and consent of the council.

As of 2024, the mayor is Republican Arman Fardanesh, who is a term expiring December 31, 2027. Members of the Borough Council are Council President Jonathan W. Ditkoff (R, 2025), Sarah Drennan (R, 2025), Joanne Florio (R, 2024), Donna A. Friedlander (R, 2026), Richard Lyons (R, 2024; elected to serve an unexpired term) and Roger Masi (R, 2026).

Mayor Joanne Minichetti resigned from office in October 2022 over issues related to the construction of a sports facility in the borough. Councilmember Arman Fardanesh was appointed in November to fill Minichetti's vacant seat expiring in December 2023. In December, Richard Lyons was appointed to Fardanesh's vacant council seat expiring in December 2024.

In July 2021, the borough council appointed Sarah Drennan to occupy the seat expiring in December 2022 that became vacant following the resignation of Douglas Rotella. In the November 2021 general election, Drennan was elected to serve the remainder of the term of office.

In March 2019, the borough council selected Douglas Rotella from a list of three candidates nominated by the Republican municipal committee to fill the seat expiring in December 2019 that had been held by Thomas H. Hafner until he resigned from office the previous month.

=== Federal, state and county representation ===
Upper Saddle River is located in the 5th Congressional District and is part of New Jersey's 39th state legislative district.

For the 119th United States Congress, New Jersey's 5th congressional district is represented by Josh Gottheimer (D, Wyckoff). New Jersey is represented in the United States Senate by Democrats Cory Booker (Newark, term ends 2027) and Andy Kim (Moorestown, term ends 2031).

For the 2026–2027 session, the 39th legislative district of the New Jersey Legislature is represented in the State Senate by Holly Schepisi (R, River Vale) and in the General Assembly by Robert Auth (R, Old Tappan) and John V. Azzariti (R, Saddle River).

Bergen County is governed by a directly elected County Executive, with legislative functions performed by a Board of County Commissioners comprised of seven members who are elected at-large to three-year terms in partisan elections on a staggered basis, with either two or three seats coming up for election each November; a Chairman and Vice Chairman are selected from among its seven members at a reorganization meeting held every January. As of 2025, the county executive is James J. Tedesco III (D, Paramus), whose four-year term of office ends December 31, 2026.

Bergen County's Commissioners are Chair Mary J. Amoroso (D, Mahwah, 2025), Vice Chair Steven A. Tanelli (D, North Arlington, 2027), Chair Pro Tem Joan Voss (D, Fort Lee, 2026), Rafael Marte (D, Bergenfield, 2026), Germaine M. Ortiz (D, Emerson, 2025), Thomas J. Sullivan Jr. (D, Montvale, 2025) and Tracy Silna Zur (D, Franklin Lakes, 2027).

Bergen County's elected constitutional officials are Clerk John S. Hogan (D, Northvale, 2026), Sheriff Anthony Cureton (D, Englewood, 2027) and Surrogate Michael R. Dressler (D, Cresskill, 2026).

=== Politics ===
As of March 2011, there were a total of 5,587 registered voters in Upper Saddle River, of which 996 (17.8% vs. 31.7% countywide) were registered as Democrats, 1,840 (32.9% vs. 21.1%) were registered as Republicans and 2,746 (49.1% vs. 47.1%) were registered as Unaffiliated. There were 5 voters registered as Libertarians or Greens. Among the borough's 2010 Census population, 68.1% (vs. 57.1% in Bergen County) were registered to vote, including 98.1% of those ages 18 and over (vs. 73.7% countywide).

Gubernatorial election results for Upper Saddle River
Year	Republican		Democratic		Third party(ies)	
Year	No.	%	No.	%	No.	%
2025	2,233	57.26%	1,660	42.56%	7	0.18%
2021	1,853	61.20%	1,165	38.47%	10	0.33%
2017	1,270	59.60%	836	39.23%	25	1.17%
2013	1,817	78.02%	493	21.17%	19	0.82%
2009	1,830	64.14%	899	31.51%	124	4.35%
2005	1,533	60.52%	972	38.37%	28	1.11%

In the 2016 presidential election, Republican Donald Trump received 2,350 votes (52.7% vs. 41.1% countywide), ahead of Democrat Hillary Clinton with 1,945 votes (43.6% vs. 54.2%) and other candidates with 161 votes (3.6% vs. 4.6%), among the 4,510 ballots cast by the borough's 6,330 registered voters, for a turnout of 71.3% (vs. 72.5% in Bergen County). In the 2012 presidential election, Republican Mitt Romney received 2,726 votes (65.3% vs. 43.5% countywide), ahead of Democrat Barack Obama with 1,405 votes (33.7% vs. 54.8%) and other candidates with 22 votes (0.5% vs. 0.9%), among the 4,174 ballots cast by the borough's 5,987 registered voters, for a turnout of 69.7% (vs. 70.4% in Bergen County). In the 2008 presidential election, Republican John McCain received 2,565 votes (58.1% vs. 44.5% countywide), ahead of Democrat Barack Obama with 1,788 votes (40.5% vs. 53.9%) and other candidates with 29 votes (0.7% vs. 0.8%), among the 4,415 ballots cast by the borough's 5,648 registered voters, for a turnout of 78.2% (vs. 76.8% in Bergen County). In the 2004 presidential election, Republican George W. Bush received 2,671 votes (61.5% vs. 47.2% countywide), ahead of Democrat John Kerry with 1,635 votes (37.6% vs. 51.7%) and other candidates with 24 votes (0.6% vs. 0.7%), among the 4,345 ballots cast by the borough's 5,319 registered voters, for a turnout of 81.7% (vs. 76.9% in the whole county).

United States presidential election results for Upper Saddle River 2024 2020 2016 2012 2008 2004
Year	Republican		Democratic		Third party(ies)	
Year	No.	%	No.	%	No.	%
2024	2,734	52.79%	2,330	44.99%	115	2.22%
2020	2,675	49.42%	2,677	49.46%	61	1.13%
2016	2,350	52.74%	1,945	43.65%	161	3.61%
2012	2,726	65.64%	1,405	33.83%	22	0.53%
2008	2,565	58.53%	1,788	40.80%	29	0.66%
2004	2,671	61.69%	1,635	37.76%	24	0.55%

In the 2013 gubernatorial election, Republican Chris Christie received 78.0% of the vote (1,817 cast), ahead of Democrat Barbara Buono with 21.2% (493 votes), and other candidates with 0.8% (19 votes), among the 2,369 ballots cast by the borough's 5,699 registered voters (40 ballots were spoiled), for a turnout of 41.6%. In the 2009 gubernatorial election, Republican Chris Christie received 1,830 votes (63.8% vs. 45.8% countywide), ahead of Democrat Jon Corzine with 899 votes (31.3% vs. 48.0%), Independent Chris Daggett with 115 votes (4.0% vs. 4.7%) and other candidates with 9 votes (0.3% vs. 0.5%), among the 2,869 ballots cast by the borough's 5,620 registered voters, yielding a 51.0% turnout (vs. 50.0% in the county).

United States Senate election results for Upper Saddle River1
Year	Republican		Democratic		Third party(ies)	
Year	No.	%	No.	%	No.	%
2024	2,673	53.89%	2,187	44.09%	100	2.02%
2018	1,907	58.95%	1,271	39.29%	57	1.76%
2012	2,450	63.50%	1,353	35.07%	55	1.43%
2006	1,703	61.52%	1,046	37.79%	19	0.69%

United States Senate election results for Upper Saddle River2
Year	Republican		Democratic		Third party(ies)	
Year	No.	%	No.	%	No.	%
2020	2,785	51.79%	2,540	47.24%	52	0.97%
2014	1,743	60.99%	1,080	37.79%	35	1.22%
2013	898	57.97%	648	41.83%	3	0.19%
2008	2,468	60.51%	1,578	38.69%	33	0.81%

== Education ==
Public school students in pre-kindergarten through eighth grade attend the Upper Saddle River School District. As of the 2023–24 school year, the district, comprised of three schools, had an enrollment of 1,099 students and 115.0 classroom teachers (on an FTE basis), for a student–teacher ratio of 9.6:1. The schools in the district (with 2023–24 enrollment data from the National Center for Education Statistics) are Robert D. Reynolds Primary School with 345 students in grades PreK–2, Edith A. Bogert Elementary School with 361 students in grades 3–5 and Emil A. Cavallini Middle School with 387 students in grades 6–8.

Public school students in Upper Saddle River for ninth through twelfth grades attend Northern Highlands Regional High School, which also serves students from Allendale and Ho-Ho-Kus, along with some students from Saddle River, New Jersey (who have the option of attending either Northern Highlands or Ramsey High School, as part of sending/receiving relationships with the two districts). As of the 2023–24 school year, the high school had an enrollment of 1,261 students and 113.0 classroom teachers (on an FTE basis), for a student–teacher ratio of 11.2:1. The ten voting seats on the high school district's board of education are allocated based on a percentage of the enrollment coming from each constituent municipality, with five seats allocated to Upper Saddle River.

Public school students from the borough, and all of Bergen County, are eligible to attend the secondary education programs offered by the Bergen County Technical Schools, which include the Bergen County Academies in Hackensack, and the Bergen Tech campus in Teterboro or Paramus. The district offers programs on a shared-time or full-time basis, with admission based on a selective application process and tuition covered by the student's home school district.

Rodie Child Care Center, run by the YWCA of Bergen County, is open to children from 6 weeks old to 6 years old, including an all-day private Kindergarten class, and is located on Pleasant Avenue.

== Transportation ==
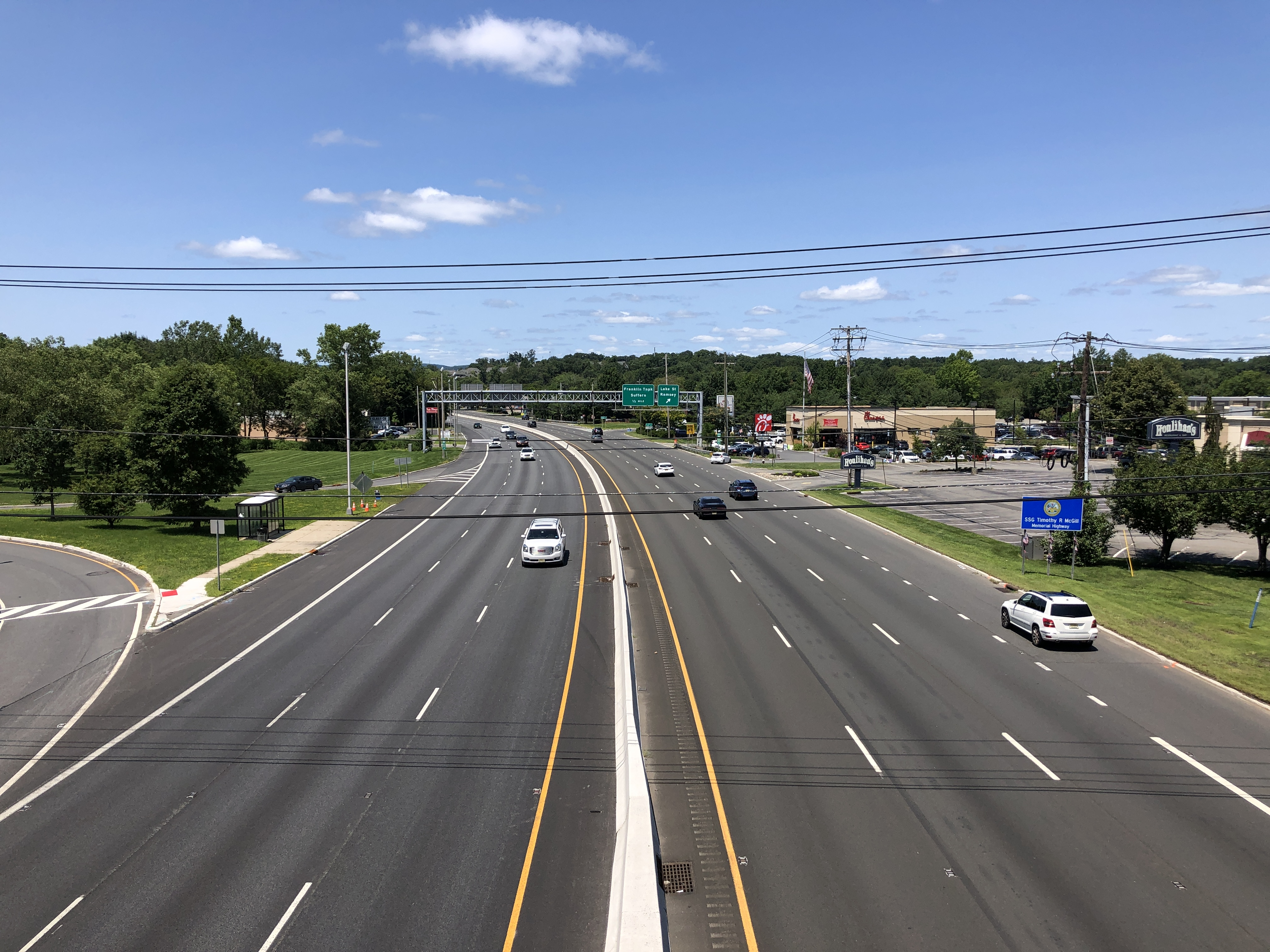
View north along Route 17 in Upper Saddle River

=== Roads and highways ===
As of May 2010, the borough had a total of 60.00 miles (96.56 km) of roadways, of which 51.56 miles (82.98 km) were maintained by the municipality, 7.83 miles (12.60 km) by Bergen County and 0.61 miles (0.98 km) by the New Jersey Department of Transportation.

Route 17, West Saddle River Road, East Saddle River Road, and Lake Street are the main roads in Upper Saddle River.

=== Public transportation ===
Short Line offers limited service from stops on Lake Street and Saddle River Road between the borough and the Port Authority Bus Terminal in Midtown Manhattan.

== Notable people ==
People who were born in, residents of, or otherwise closely associated with Upper Saddle River include:

- Kristie Ahn (born 1992), professional tennis player
- Jim Bankoff (born 1969), chairman and CEO of Vox Media and a senior advisor for Providence Equity Partners
- Beth Beglin (born 1957), field hockey player who represented the United States three times at the Summer Olympics
- Joe Cinderella (1927–2012), jazz guitarist
- Dean DeNobile (born 2003), college football quarterback for the Florida State Seminoles
- Harold Dow (1947–2010), television news correspondent, journalist and investigative reporter with CBS News
- Wes Ellis (1932–1984), professional golfer
- Jay Feely (born 1976), professional NFL kicker who played for the New York Jets
- Michael Ray Garvin (born 1986), wide receiver for the Las Vegas Locomotives
- George Gately (1928–2001), cartoonist who was creator of the popular Heathcliff comic strip
- Edward H. Hynes (born 1946), politician who served two terms in the New Jersey General Assembly
- Kristine Johnson (born 1972), co-anchor at WCBS-TV in New York City
- Margaret Juntwait (1957–2015), the voice of the Metropolitan Opera radio broadcasts
- Jason Kidd (born 1973), head coach of the Dallas Mavericks
- Vincent Lamberti (c. 1928–2014), lab researcher whose work resulted in 118 patents, most notably the development of Dove soap
- Ken Levine (born 1966), video game developer who is the creative director and co-founder of Ghost Story Games
- Jason Miller (1939–2001), playwright and actor, who won the 1973 Pulitzer Prize for Drama and Tony Award for Best Play for his play That Championship Season
- Tomas J. Padilla, politician who served on the Bergen County Board of Chosen Freeholders and has served as Borough Administrator in Woodcliff Lake
- Bill Parcells (born 1941), NFL head coach for the New York Giants from 1983 to 1990.
- Jason Patric (born 1966 as Jason Patric Miller), actor who has appeared in The Lost Boys and Sleepers
- Kevin J. Rooney (born 1960), politician who represented the 40th Legislative District in the New Jersey General Assembly
- Gary Saul Stein (born 1933), attorney and former Associate Justice of the New Jersey Supreme Court, who served for 17 years where he wrote over 365 published opinions
- Lawrence Taylor (born 1959), retired Hall of Fame American football player
- Ron Villone (born 1970), pitcher who played for the New York Yankees and 11 other teams during his MLB career
- Roy White (born 1943), professional baseball player who played for the New York Yankees
- George Young (1930–2001), American football player, coach and executive who served as the general manager of the New York Giants from 1979 to 1997
- Matthew Ziff (born 1991), actor and producer

== Sources ==
- Municipal Incorporations of the State of New Jersey (according to Counties) prepared by the Division of Local Government, Department of the Treasury (New Jersey); December 1, 1958.
- Clayton, W. Woodford; and Nelson, William. History of Bergen and Passaic Counties, New Jersey, with Biographical Sketches of Many of its Pioneers and Prominent Men., Philadelphia: Everts and Peck, 1882.
- Harvey, Cornelius Burnham (ed.), Genealogical History of Hudson and Bergen Counties, New Jersey. New York: New Jersey Genealogical Publishing Co., 1900.
- Van Valen, James M. History of Bergen County, New Jersey. New York: New Jersey Publishing and Engraving Co., 1900.
- Westervelt, Frances A. (Frances Augusta), 1858–1942, History of Bergen County, New Jersey, 1630–1923, Lewis Historical Publishing Company, 1923.
