= Hendrick Hopper House =

Historic house in New Jersey, United States

- Hendrick Hopper Homestead
- U.S. National Register of Historic Places
- New Jersey Register of Historic Places
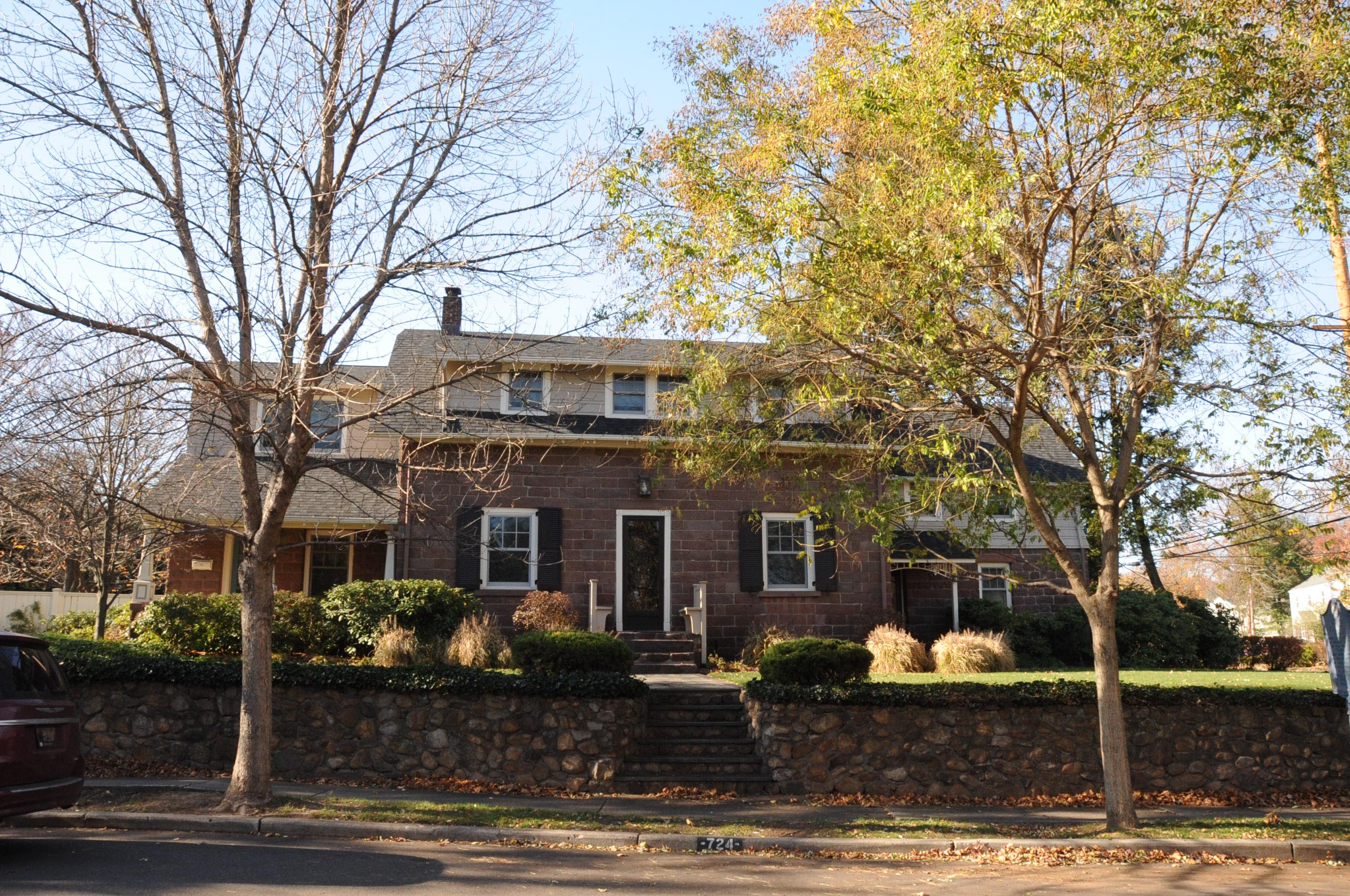

- Location within Bergen County, New Jersey Location within New Jersey Location within the United States
- Location: 724 Ackerman Avenue; Glen Rock, New Jersey 07452
- Coordinates: 40°57′32″N 74°6′48.5″W
- Built: c. 1780
- MPS: Stone Houses of Bergen County TR
- NRHP reference No.: 83001526
- NJRHP No.: 517

Significant dates
- Added to NRHP: January 9, 1983
- Designated NJRHP: October 3, 1980

The Hendrick Hopper Homestead is located at 724 Ackerman Avenue in the borough of Glen Rock in Bergen County, New Jersey, United States. The historic stone house was built in the early 19th century. It was home to the Hopper Family and is located on the corner of Ackerman Avenue and Hillman Avenue. The site was added to the National Register of Historic Places on January 9, 1983, for its significance in architecture. It was listed as part of the Early Stone Houses of Bergen County Multiple Property Submission (MPS). This house is occupied by a family.

A blue sign stands in front of the house that reads:

Hopper Homestead

North wing built 1780 by Hendrick Hopper in area then called “small lots.” Center section erected by son, John, in early 1800s. The farmhouse was sold to the Hillmann family in 1895 ending four generations and 115 years of continuous Hopper ownership.

The Hopper Family burying ground is also located behind the Hopper Homestead where the farms of Garrett E. Hopper and Hendrick H. Hopper met. Descendants of Hendrick Jan Hopper are buried in the cemetery.

== See also ==
- National Register of Historic Places listings in Bergen County, New Jersey
